= List of BBC children's television programmes =

List of programs broadcast by CBBC

This is a list of CBBC programmes that are currently and formerly being broadcast on the children's television strand of the BBC in the United Kingdom.

== Current programming ==
=== Live action ===
- 4 O'Clock Club (2012–2020, reruns)
- Almost Never (2019–2021)
- Andy and the Band (2020–2023)
- Armorsaurs (2026–present)
- Art Ninja (2015–2019)
- The Beaker Girls (2021–present)
- Blue Peter (1958–present)
- Born to Spy (2022–present)
- Bro's in Control (2022–present)
- Class Dismissed (2016–present)
- Clipheads (2022–present)
- Cooking Buddies (2024–present)
- Danny and Mick (2019–present)
- Davey & Jonesie's Locker (2025–present)
- Deadly 60 (2009–2012, 2020–present)
- The Dengineers (2015–present)
- Dodger (2022–present)
- The Dumping Ground (2013–present)
- Game on Grandparents (2022–present)
- Gangnam Project (2024–present)
- Girl Troop vs Aliens (2026–present)
- Gormiti: The New Era (2025–present)
- Got What It Takes? (2016–2021)
- Hardball (2021–present)
- Heirs of the Night (2020–present)
- Hey You What If? (2020–present)
- High Hoops (2025–present)
- Horrible Histories (2015–present)
- Horrible Science (2025–present)
- iCarly (2025–present)
- Itch (2020–present)
- Jamie Johnson (2016–2022, reruns)
- Jamie Johnson FC (2023–present)
- The Lady Grace Mysteries (2026–present)
- Lagging (2021–present)
- Lifebabble (2016–2017)
- Little Lunch (2025–present)
- Malory Towers (2020–2025, reruns)
- Matilda and the Ramsay Bunch (2015–2019)
- Meet the McQueens (2023–present)
- My Life (2011–present)
- Mystic (2020–present)
- Newsround (1972–present)
- The Next Step (2014–2025, reruns)
- The Next Step: Cheer (2026–present)
- Nova Jones (2021–present)
- Odd Squad (2015–present)
- One Zoo Three (2020–present)
- Operation Ouch! (2012–present)
- Our School (2014–present)
- Out of This World (2020–present)
- The Pets Factor (2017–present)
- Pickle Storm (2024–present)
- Sam & Cat (2025–present)
- Saturday Mash-Up! (2017–present)
- Show Me The Honey (2021–present)
- Silverpoint (2022–2023)
- Sketchy Comedy (2018)
- Snaps (2021–present)
- So Awkward (2015–2020, reruns)
  - Still So Awkward (2021–2025, reruns)
- The Story of Tracy Beaker (2002–present)
- Theodosia (2022–present)
- What's Cooking Omari (2020–present)
- Wow That's Amazing (2022–present)
- The Zoo (2017–present)

=== Animation ===
- The Adventures of Mansour: Age of AI (2024–present)
- The Amazing World of Gumball (2026-present)
- Apple & Onion (2026-present)
- Arthur (1997–2022) (iPlayer only; since 2023)
- Boy Girl Dog Cat Mouse Cheese (2019–present)
- Beyblade X (2024–present)
- Counterfeit Cat (2026–present)
- Danger Mouse (2015–present)
- The Deep (2016–present)
- Dennis & Gnasher: Unleashed! (2017–2021)
- Do NOT Watch This Show (2026-present)
- Dragon Ball Super (2022–present) (iPlayer only)
- DreamWorks Dragons: The Nine Realms (2022–present)
- Duck and Frog (2026–present)
- Fright Krewe (2024–present)
- Girls of Olympus (2023–present) (iPlayer only)
- Gremlins (2023–present)
- Grizzy & the Lemmings (2023–present)
- The Heroic Quest of the Valiant Prince Ivandoe (2026-present)
- Miraculous: Tales of Ladybug & Cat Noir (2024–present)
- Monster Loving Maniacs (2022–present)
- Mystery Lane (2026-present)
- Ninja Express (2021–present)
- OOglies (2009–2015)
- Pablo: Next Level (Note: This is a sequel series of the 2017 show about Pablo starting school) (2026-present)
- Pokémon (2022–present)
  - Pokémon the Series: Diamond and Pearl (2022–present)
  - Pokémon the Series: Black & White (2022–present) (iPlayer only)
  - Pokémon the Series: XY (2023–present) (iPlayer only)
  - Pokémon the Series: Sun & Moon (2022–present)
  - Pokémon Journeys: The Series (2025–present) (iPlayer only)
  - Pokémon Horizons: The Series (2023–present)
- Ronja, the Robber's Daughter (2022–present)
- Scooby-Doo (1970-2015; 2026-present)
  - What's New, Scooby-Doo? (2003–2015; 2026–present)
  - Be Cool, Scooby-Doo! (2026-present)
  - Scooby-Doo and Guess Who? (2026-present)
- Scream Street (2015–present)
- Shaun the Sheep (2007–present)
- Sherwood (2025–present)
- SpongeBob SquarePants (2025–present)
- The Strange Chores (2025–present)
- Submarine Jim (2026–present)
- Super Happy Magic Forest (2024–present)
- Taffy (2023–present)
- Teen Titans Go! (2026–present)
- That’s Jokes (2026-present)
- Total Drama (2022–present) (Ridonculous Race is iPlayer only)
  - Total Drama Presents: The Ridonculous Race (2022–present)
  - Total DramaRama (2023–present)
  - Total Drama Island (2023) (2023–present)
- Transformers: EarthSpark (2023–present)
- Tuff Pom (2026-present)
- Winx Club: The Magic Is Back (2025–present)
- Witch Detectives (2026–present)

=== IPlayer only ===
- Adventure Time
- Regular Show

=== Upcoming ===
- Andy and the Band - Rock Star School
- Anisha, Accidental Detective
- Children Vs Battle SuperStars
- Dungeons & Kittens
- Hyperlight: Battle of the Guardians
- Little Lunch: New Class
- My Life is a Manga
- Vanishing Point
- The Wolfbjorns
- The Young Magicians

== Former programming ==
=== @ ===
- @ the Edge

=== 0–9 ===
- 12 Again
- The 13 Ghosts of Scooby-Doo
- 3rd & Bird (1 July 2008)
- 4 O'Clock Files (15 December 2014)
- 50/50 (7 April 1997, 12 July 2005)
- 64 Zoo Lane (3 April 2000)
- The 8:15 from Manchester (15 September 1990)

=== A ===
- Abadas (2011)
- Absolute Genius with Dick and Dom
- Ace Lightning
- Ace Ventura: Pet Detective
- Activ8
- The Addams Family (1964 TV series)
- The Addams Family (1973 animated series)
- The Addams Family (1992 animated series)
- Adventure Florida (2008)
- The Adventure Game
- Adventures from the Book of Virtues
- The Adventures of Abney & Teal (2011)
- The Adventures of Blinky Bill
- The Adventures of the Garden Fairies
- The Adventures of Parsley
- The Adventures of Raggedy Ann and Andy
- The Adventures of Robinson Crusoe
- The Adventures of Shirley Holmes
- The Adventures of Sir Prancelot
- The Adventures of Skippy
- Aesop's Tales
- Against All Odds
- Agent Z and the Penguin from Mars
- Albert the Fifth Musketeer
- Alesha's Street Dance Stars
- Alfonso Bonzo
- Ali-A's Superchargers
- Alienators: Evolution Continues
- Aliens in the Family
- The All-New Pink Panther Show
- The All-New Popeye Show
- All at Sea
- All or Nothing
- All Over the Place
- All Over the Workplace
- All Your Own
- The All-New Pink Panther Show
- Alphabet Attack
- Alphablocks
- Alvin and the Chipmunks
- The Amazing Adventures of Morph
- The Amazing Chan and the Chan Clan
- Andy Pandy
- Andy's Baby Animals
- Andy's Dinosaur Adventures
- Andy's Dino Toybox
- Andy's Prehistoric Adventures
- Andy's Safari Adventures
- Andy's Secret Hideout
- Andy's Wild Adventures
- Andy's Wild Workouts
- Angelmouse
- Angus and Cheryl
- The Amelia Gething Complex
- Animal Arc
- Animal Fair (TV series)
- Animal Magic
- The Animal Magic Show
- Animal World (2015)
- Animaland
- Animalia
- Animals at Work
- The Animals of Farthing Wood
- Animorphs
- Anthony Ant
- The Antics Road Show
- Anytime Tales
- Ape Man: Adventures in Human Evolution
- Apple Tree House
- Aquila
- Archer's Goon
- Arizona (TV series)
- Around the World with Willy Fog
- Art Ninja
- Astro Boy
- AstroKids
- Atlantis High
- Attack of the Killer Tomatoes: The Animated Series

=== B ===
- Babar
- The Baby Club
- Baby Jake
- Back to the Future
- Backshall's Deadly Adventures
- Bad Boyes
- Bad Penny
- Badjelly the Witch
- Baggy Pants and the Nitwits
- Bagpuss
- Bailey Kipper's P.O.V.
- Bailey's Comets
- The Baker Street Boys
- Balamory
- Bamzooki
- The Banana Splits
- Bananaman (1983–1986, 1989–1999)
- Barbapapa (1975–1978)
- Barmy Aunt Boomerang
- Barnaby the Bear
- Barney
- Barney Bear
- Barney's Barrier Reef
- Barney's Latin America
- The Bartons
- The Basil Brush Show
- Basil's Game Show
- Basil's Swap Shop
- Batfink
- Battle of the Planets
- The Batman
- Batty Adventures
- Bay City
- BB3B
- Bear Behaving Badly
- A Bear Behind
- Beat the Boss
- Beat the Teacher
- Beau Geste
- Becky and Barnaby Bear
- Bedtime Stories
- Belfry Witches
- Bernard
- Bertha
- Bellamy's Backyard Safari
- Belle and Sebastian
- Belle and Sebastian
- The Bellflower Bunnies
- Benji, Zax & the Alien Prince
- Best of Friends
- Betty Boop
- Beyond Bionic
- Big Fat Like
- Big & Small
- Big Babies
- Big Barn Farm
- Big City Park
- Big Cook, Little Cook
- Big Kids
- The Big Knights
- Biggleton
- The Big Performance
- Big Wolf on Campus
- Bill and Ben
- Billy Bean and His Funny Machine
- Billy Bunter of Greyfriars School
- Billy Webb's Amazing Stories
- Bing
- Binka
- The Biskitts
- Bits and Bobs
- Bitsa
- Bitz & Bob
- The Biz
- Bizzy Lizzy
- Blackhearts in Battersea
- Bleep and Booster
- Blood and Honey (TV series)
- Blow Your Mind (TV series)
- Blue Peter
- Bluebirds
- Bluey
- The Bluffers
- Bobobobs
- Bob the Builder
- Bobinogs
- Bod
- Bodger & Badger
- Boj
- Boo!
- Boogie Beebies
- The Bookworms
- The Boot Street Band
- Bootleg
- The Borrowers
- Bosco
- B.O.T. and the Beasties
- The Bots Master
- Bottersnikes and Gumbles
- The Box of Delights
- The Brady Kids
- Brain Freeze (TV series)
- Brain-Jitsu
- Brambly Hedge
- BraveStarr
- Break in the Sun
- Break Point
- Bric-a-Brac
- Bright Sparks
- Bring It On (TV series)
- The Brollys
- Brum
- Bruno the Kid
- Bucky O'Hare and the Toad Wars!
- Buddy
- Bump
- Bump in the Night
- Bunyip
- The Busy World of Richard Scarry
- But First This
- Butterfly Island
- Byker Grove

=== C ===
- C Bear and Jamal
- CB Bears
- Calimero
- Camberwick Green
- Captain Abercromby
- Captain Caveman and the Teen Angels
- Captain Pugwash
- Captain Scarlet and the Mysterons
- Captain Zep – Space Detective
- Carrie and David's Popshop
- Carrie's War
- Cartoon Critters
- Casper
- Casper Classics
- Caterpillar Trail
- Catie's Amazing Machines
- Cats Eyes
- Cavegirl
- CB Bears
- Celebrity Driving Academy
- Century Falls
- ChalkZone
- Champion the Wonder Horse
- The Changes
- Charlie and Lola
- The Charlie Brown and Snoopy Show (1986–2005)
- Charlie Chalk
- Cheggers Plays Pop
- Chegwin Checks It Out
- CBBC @ R1's Teen Awards
- CBBC does Fame Academy
- CBBC Official Chart Show
- CBBC Visits the Wizarding World of Harry Potter and Fantastic Beasts
- CBeebies Bedtime Stories
- Chigley
- Children of Fire Mountain
- The Children of Green Knowe
- The Chinese Puzzle
- Chip 'n' Dale
- Chipmunks Go to the Movies
- Chock-A-Block
- Christopher Crocodile
- The Chronicles of Narnia
- Chuck Finn
- The ChuckleHounds
- ChuckleVision
- Chucklewood Critters
- Chuggington
- Chute!
- CINEMANIACS
- Clangers
- Clarissa Explains It All
- Class
- Class Dismissed
- Clifford the Big Red Dog
- Clifford's Puppy Days
- Clockwise (TV series)
- Cloudbabies
- Clowning Around
- Clutter Nutters
- Codename Icarus
- Colour in the Creek
- Come Outside
- Comic Relief Does Glee Club
- Conan the Adventurer
- Connie the Cow
- Cop School
- Copycats
- Corners
- The Country Boy (TV series)
- Crackerjack
- The Cramp Twins
- Creeped Out (TV series)
- Crisis Control
- Crocadoo
- Crush (BBC TV series)
- The Crust
- Crystal Tipps and Alistair
- Cubix
- Cuckoo Land
- Cupidon Mouse

=== D ===
- Da Dick and Dom Dairies
- Danger Mouse
- Dance Factory
- Dani's Castle
- Dani's House
- The Dare Devil
- Dark Season
- Dastardly and Muttley in Their Flying Machines
- Dead Entry
- Dead Gorgeous
- Dear Heart
- Dear Mr Barker
- Deadly 360
- Deadly 60
- Deadly 60 on a Mission
- Deadly Art
- Deadly Top 10s
- The December Rose
- The Deep
- Defenders of the Earth
- Degrassi Junior High
- The Demon Headmaster
- The Dengineers
- Dennis and Gnasher
- Dennis the Menace and Gnasher
- Deputy Dawg
- Desperados
- Dick & Dom in da Bungalow
- Dick and Dom's Funny Business
- Dick and Dom's Hoopla
- Dick 'N' Dom Go Wild
- Diddy Dick and Dom
- Diddy Movies
- Diddy TV
- Dilly the Dinosaur
- Dink, the Little Dinosaur
- Dinky Dog
- Dinky Duck
- Dino Babies
- Dinopaws
- Dinosapien
- Dinosaur Detectives
- Dipdap
- Dirtgirlworld
- Disaster Chef
- Dizzy Heights
- DNN: Definitely Not Newsround
- Do Something Different
- Do You Know?
- Doctor Dolittle
- Dodgem
- Dragon Quest: Dai no Daiboken (2021)
- Doctor Who: Dreamland
- Doctor Who: The Infinite Quest
- The Dog Ate My Homework
- Dog Loves Books
- Dogstar
- Dogtanian and the Three Muskehounds
- Don and Pete
- Donald Duck
- Dooby Duck's Disco Bus
- Dooby Duck's Euro Tour
- Dooby's Duck Truck
- Doodle Do
- Double Dare
- Down on the Farm
- DreamWorks Dragons
- Dr Otter
- Drak Pack
- Driver Dan's Story Train
- Droopy
- Droopy, Master Detective
- Dudley Do-Right
- The Dumping Ground Survival Files
- Duncan Dares
- Dungeons & Dragons
- Dustbin Baby
- Dwight in Shining Armor (2021–2025)
- DynaMo

=== E ===
- Earthfasts
- Ed and Oucho's Excellent Inventions
- The Ed and Zed Show
- Eek! The Cat
- Eggs 'n' Baker
- El Nombre
- Erky Perky
- Election
- The Electric Company
- Elidor
- Eliot Kid
- Emu's Broadcasting Company
- Endangered Species
- Enid Blyton's Enchanted Lands
- Ernie's Incredible Illucinations
- Escape from Jupiter
- Escape from Scorpion Island
- Ethelbert the Tiger (2005)
- Eureka
- Eureka TV
- Evacuation
- Eve
- Even Stevens
- Everything's Rosie
- Expo (TV series)
- The Eye of the Dragon

=== F ===
- Fab Lab
- Fame Academy
- The Fame Game
- The Family-Ness
- Fantastic Max
- Fantastic Four
- The Fairly OddParents (Season 1, Nelvana era only)
- Fast Forward
- Favorite Songs
- Fear Falls
- Feather Boy
- Fee Fi Fo Yum
- Feeling Better
- Fergus McPhail
- Ferne and Rory's Teeny Tiny Creatures
- Ferne and Rory's Vet Tales
- Fiddley Foodle Bird
- Fievel's American Tails
- Fimbles
- Fingerbobs
- Fingermouse
- Finley the Fire Engine
- Fireman Sam
- First Day
- Fit
- Five Children and It
- Fix & Foxi and Friends
- Flash Gordon
- The Flashing Blade
- Flint the Time Detective
- The Flintstone Kids
- The Flintstone Comedy Hour
- The Flintstone Comedy Show
- The Flintstones
- The Flumps
- Fly-High and Huggy
- Flip
- Fly Tales
- Footy Pups
- The Fonz and the Happy Days Gang
- For the Children
- Forget Me Not Farm
- Fox Tales
- Frankenstein's Cat
- Fred Basset
- Fred and Barney Meet the Shmoo
- Free Willy
- Freefonix
- Friday Download
- Friday Film Special
- Friends and Heroes
- Fudge
- Fully Booked
- Fungus the Bogeyman
- Funky Fables
- The Funky Phantom
- Funnybones
- The Furchester Hotel
- The Further Adventures of SuperTed

=== G ===
- Gadget Boy & Heather
- Galaxy Goof-Ups
- Galidor: Defenders of the Outer Dimension
- Galloping Galaxies!
- Garden Tales
- Garth and Bev
- Gastronauts
- The Genie from Down Under
- Gentle Ben
- Geronimo Stilton
- Get 100
- Get Squiggling
- Get Set
- Get Well Soon
- Get Your Own Back
- The Ghost Hunter
- Ghostwriter
- The Gift
- Gigglebiz
- Gigglequiz
- Gimme a Break
- Gina's Laughing Gear
- The Girl from Tomorrow
- The Girl from Tomorrow Part II: Tomorrow's End
- Glad Rags
- Go Jetters
- Go with Noakes
- Godzilla
- Godzilla: The Series
- Going Live!
- Goober and the Ghost Chasers
- Goodbye Year 6
- Goofy
- Goosebumps
- Gordon the Garden Gnome
- Gordon the Gopher
- Grace's Amazing Machines
- Gran
- Grandad
- Grandpa in My Pocket
- Grange Hill
- Gravedale High
- The Great Grape Ape Show
- The Greedysaurus Gang
- Green Balloon Club
- Greenclaws
- Gruey
- Guess with Jess
- Gundrun: The Viking Princess
- Gym Stars

=== H ===
- Hacker Time
- Hacker's Birthday Bash: 30 Years of Children's BBC
- Hacker's CBBC Christmas Carol
- Hacker's CBBC Top 10
- Hacker's Crackers
- Hacker's Olympic Rundown
- Hai! Karate – Journey to Japan
- Hairy Jeremy
- Half Moon Investigations
- The Hallo Spencer Show
- Hangar 17
- Hank Zipzer
- Happy Families
- Happy Tent Tales
- Hardball
- Hartbeat
- Hard Spell Abbey
- Harlem Globetrotters
- Harriet's Army
- Harry and the Hendersons
- Harry and Toto
- Hattytown Tales
- Heads and Tails
- Heathcliff
- Heathcliff and the Catillac Cats
- Hector Heathcote
- Hector's House
- Hedz
- Help! My Supply Teacher's Magic
- Help! Teach Is Coming to Stay
- Help!... It's the Hair Bear Bunch!
- Henry's Cat
- The Herbs
- Here Come the Double Deckers
- Hergé's Adventures of Tintin (1957 series)
- Hero Squad
- Hero to Zero
- Hetty Feather
- Hey Duggee
- Heyyy, It's the King!
- Hider in the House
- Higgledy House
- Highlander: The Animated Series
- Histeria!
- Hit The Stage
- Hokey Cokey
- Hokey Wolf
- The Hollies School
- Hollywood 7
- Holly Hobbie
- Home Farm Twins
- Hong Kong Phooey
- Horrible Histories (2009 TV series)
- Horrible Histories (2015 TV series)
- Horrible Histories: Gory Games
- Horses Galore
- Hotch Potch House
- Hotel Trubble
- Hounded
- The House Of Gristle
- How To Be Epic @ Everything
- Hububb
- Huckleberry Finn and His Friends
- Hushabye Lullabye
- Hunter's Gold

=== I ===
- I Can Cook
- I Can Dream
- I Dare You
- I Dream
- I Hate This House
- I Love Mummy
- I Want My Own Room
- I Was a Rat
- Ice Stars
- Iconicles
- The Impossibles
- In the Night Garden...
- Inch High, Private Eye
- Incredible Games
- The Incredible Hulk (1982 series)
- The Incredible Hulk (1996 series)
- The Infinite Quest
- Ingenious
- Inside Life
- Insides Out
- Intergalactic Kitchen
- Ipso Facto
- Iron Man
- It'll Never Work
- Itsy Bitsy Spider
- Ivor the Engine
- Iznogoud

=== J ===
- Jackanory
- Jackie Chan Adventures
- Jakers! The Adventures of Piggley Winks
- Jamie Johnson
- Jamillah and Aladdin
- Jana of the Jungle
- Janosch's Story Time
- Jedward's Big Adventure
- Jeopardy
- Jeremiah in the Dark Woods
- The Jetsons
- Jigsaw
- Jim Henson's Animal Show
- Jimbo and the Jet-Set
- Jinx
- Jockey School
- Joe
- Joe 90
- Joe All Alone
- Johnny and the Bomb
- The Johnny and Inel Show
- Johnson and Friends (1991–1999)
- JoJo & Gran Gran
- Jollywobbles!
- Jonny Briggs
- Jonny Quest
- Joshua Jones
- Josie and the Pussycats
- Josie and the Pussycats in Outer Space
- Jossy's Giants
- The Journey of Allen Strange
- The Juggler
- Julia Jekyll and Harriet Hyde
- The Jungle Book
- Junior Bake Off
- Junior MasterChef
- Junior Vets
- Junior Vets on Call
- Juniper Jungle
- Junk Rescue
- Just So Stories
- Just William (1994 TV series)
- Just William (2010 TV series)
- Justin's House
- Just Kidding

=== K ===
- Kate & Mim Mim
- Katie Morag
- Katy
- Kazoops!
- Keep Your Enemies Close
- Keep Your Hair On
- Keith Harris and Orville
- Kenan & Kel
- Kerching!
- Kerwhizz
- Kevin and Co.
- Kevin's Cousins
- Kick Start
- Kickabout+
- Kid BubbleGum Goes Around The Globe
- The Kids from 47A
- The Kids of Degrassi Street
- King Cinder
- King Greenfingers
- King Rollo
- Kiri and Lou
- Kissyfur
- Kit & Pup
- Kizzy
- Knock, Knock
- Knowhow
- The Koala Brothers
- The Krankies Elektronik Komik
- The Kwicky Koala Show
- Krypto the Superdog

=== L ===
- L.A. 7
- Laff-A-Lympics
- Lagging
- The Lampies
- The Large Family
- Lassie
- Lassie's Rescue Rangers
- Last Commanders
- Laurel and Hardy
- Lay on Five
- LazyTown* (S1-2 Only)
- League of Super Evil
- Learning With The Pooyoos
- The Legend of Dick and Dom
- Legend of the Dragon
- The Legend of Prince Valiant
- The Legend of Tim Tyler
- Leon
- Leonardo
- Let's Celebrate
- Let's Go for a Walk!
- The Let's Go Club
- Let's Play
- Legend Quest
- Level Up
- Lifebabble
- Lift Music
- Lift Off! With Coppers and Co!
- The Likeaballs
- A Likely Lad
- Lilly the Witch
- The Lingo Show
- Lippy the Lion and Hardy Har Har
- The Lion, The Witch and The Wardrobe
- The Littl' Bits
- Little Bear
- Little Big Awesome
- Little Big Cat
- Little Charley Bear
- Little Howard's Big Question
- Little Human Planet
- Little Miss (1983–1988)
- Little Monsters
- Little Mouse on the Prairie
- The Little Polar Bear
- Little Red Tractor
- Little Robots
- Little Roy
- Little Shop
- Little Sir Nicholas
- Little Tournament Over Yonder Adventures
- The Little Vampire
- The Littlest Hobo
- Littlest Pet Shop
- Live & Kicking
- Lizzie Dripping
- Lizzie McGuire
- Lockie Leonard
- A Long Long Crime Ago
- Looney Tunes
- Lost & Found Music Studios
- Love! Love! Love! (2022–2023)
- Love Monster
- The Lowdown
- Ludus
- Ludwig
- Lulu Zipadoo
- Luna
- Lunar Jim

=== M ===
- M.I. High
- The Machine Gunners
- Maddigan's Quest
- Maggie
- Magic Door
- Magic Hands
- The Magic Key
- The Magic Roundabout
- The Magical Adventures of Quasimodo
- The Make Shift
- Maid Marian and Her Merry Men
- Mama Mirabelle's Home Movies
- Marine Boy
- Marlene Marlowe Investigates
- Marrying Mum and Dad
- Martha Speaks
- Martin's Mice
- The Marvel Action Hour
- Mary, Mungo and Midge (1969–1978)
- The Mask: Animated Series
- The Master of Ballantrae
- Match of the Day Kickabout
- Mathspy
- Matilda and the Ramsay Bunch
- Maya & Miguel
- McGee and Me!
- Me and My Monsters
- Me Too!
- Meet the Pups
- Meet the Kittens
- Melody
- Melvin and Maureen's Music-a-grams
- Merlin
- Merrie Melodies
- Messy Goes to Okido
- MetalHeads
- Miami 7
- Mick and Mac
- Mickey and Donald
- Mickey Mouse
- Microscopic Milton
- Microsoap
- Midnight Patrol: Adventures in the Dream Zone
- Mighty Max
- Mighty Mites
- Mighty Mouse
- Mighty Mouse: The New Adventures
- Mighty Truck of Stuff
- Mike the Knight
- Mike, Mop and the Moke
- Millie Inbetween
- Mimi and Co (2020)
- Minibeast Adventure with Jess
- The Ministry of Curious Stuff
- Minuscule
- Mio Mao
- Misery Guts
- Mission: 2110
- Mister Maker
- Misterjaw
- Model Millie
- The Mole
- Molly and Mack
- Mona the Vampire
- Monster Café
- Monster Court (2021–2025)
- Monster Rancher
- Monster TV
- Monty & Co
- Monty the Dog
- Moomin
- Moon and Me
- The Moon Stallion
- Moondial
- Mop and Smiff
- Morph
- The Morph Files
- Morris Minor's Marvellous Motors
- Mortified
- Mortimer and Arabel
- Mother Goose and Grimm
- Mouse and Mole
- The Movie Game
- Mr Benn
- Mr. Bloom: Here and There
- Mr. Bloom's Nursery
- Mr. Magoo
- Mr. Men (1974–1988)
- Mr. Wymi
- Mud
- Muddle Earth
- Muffin the Mule
- Multi-Coloured Swap Shop
- The Mummy: The Animated Series
- The Munsters
- Muppet Babies
- Mustangs FC
- My Almost Famous Family
- My First
- My Friend Walter
- My Genius Idea
- My Life
- My Mum Tracy Beaker (2021)
- My Perfect Landing
- My Pet and Me
- My Petsaurus
- My Story
- My Team: The Cheerleaders
- My World Kitchen
- MySay
- The Mysterious Cities of Gold
- The Mysti Show
- Mythical Magical Creatures
- Mystic
- MyWish

=== N ===
- Naomi's Nightmares of Nature
- Nelly and Nora
- Nelly Nut: Live
- The New Adventures of Black Beauty
- The New Adventures of Flash Gordon
- The New Adventures of Mighty Mouse
- The New Adventures of Sally The CowGirl
- The New Adventures of Speed Racer
- The New Adventures of Superman
- The New Adventures of Zorro
- The New Fred and Barney Show
- The New Lassie
- The New Legends of Monkey
- The New Scooby-Doo Movies
- The New Shmoo
- The New Woody Woodpecker Show
- The New Yogi Bear Show
- Newsround
- Newsround Showbiz
- Newsround Specials
- The Next Big Thing
- The Next Step
- Nick Cope's Popcast
- Night of the Red Hunter
- Nilus the Sandman
- Nina and the Neurons
- Ninja Turtles: The Next Mutation
- No Sweat
- Noah and Nelly in... SkylArk
- Noah and Saskia
- Noah's Island
- The Noddy Shop
- Noddy's Toyland Adventures
- Noggin the Nog
- Nowhere Boys
- Now You See It
- Number 74
- Numberblocks
- Numberjacks
- Numbertime
- The Numtums
- Nutty McGils
- Nuzzle and Scratch

=== O ===
- Oakie Doke
- Ocean Odyssey
- Ocean Star
- The Octonauts
- Odd Squad
- Officially Amazing
- Officially Amazing Extra
- Officially Amazing Mini
- Old Jack's Boat
- Old Jack's Boat: Rockpool Tales
- Olobob Top
- One Minute Wonders
- Only in America
- OOglies
- Open A Door
- Opposites Attract
- Orville and Cuddles
- Oscar Charlie
- Oscar's Orchestra
- Osker and the Ice-Pick
- Oswaldo (2022–2025)
- Oti's Boogie Beebies
- Oucho The Cactus
- Our CBBC
- Our Family
- Our Planet
- Our School'
- Out of Tune
- Out There
- Outback 8
- Over the Moon with Mr. Boom
- Ovide and the Gang
- The Owl

=== P ===
- Pablo
- Pablo the Little Red Fox
- Paddington
- Paradise Café
- Parallax
- Parallel 9
- Patchwork Pals
- Patrik Pacard
- Paw Paws (8 April 1988, 6 November 1990)
- PC Pinkerton
- The Pebbles and Bamm-Bamm Show
- Pedro and Frankensheep
- Penelope K, by the way
- Penny Crayon
- The Perishers
- The Perils of Penelope Pitstop (20 October 1970, 15 December 1997)
- Peter Pan & the Pirates (14 September 1992, 23 December 1999)
- Peter Rabbit
- Pet School
- Pet Squad
- The Pets Factor
- Phantom 2040
- Philbert Frog
- Philomena
- The Phoenix and the Carpet
- Picture Book
- Pie in the Sky
- Pigsty
- Pig Heart Boy
- Pigeon Street
- Pingu
- Pink Panther and Sons
- The Pink Panther Show
- Pinky and the Brain (31 October 2005, 30 December 2007)
- Pinky and Perky
- The Pinky and Perky Show
- Pinky Dinky Doo
- Pinky Malinky
- Pinny's House
- Pinocchio
- Pinocchio & Friends (30 May 2022)
- Pirates
- The Pirates of Dark Water (7 April 1992, 30 August 1997)
- Pitt & Kantrop
- Pixelface
- Pixie and Dixie (2 August 1971, 3 December 1982)
- Planet Ajay
- Planet Cook
- Planet Dinosaur Files
- Plasmo
- Play Away
- Play School
- Playdays
- The Playlist
- Pluto
- Pocket Dragon Adventures (4 January 1999)
- Pocket Money Pitch
- The POD
- The Poddington Peas
- Poetry Pie
- The Pogles
- Pole Position
- Police Academy
- Polka Dot Shorts
- Poochini's Yard
- Pop Slam!
- The Pop Zone
- Popeye
- Popeye and Son (9 October 1988, 16 December 2004)
- Postman Pat
- Postman Pat: Special Delivery Service
- Potsworth & Co. (2 January 1991, 24 June 2002)
- Powers
- Prank Patrol
- Prank Patrol Down Under
- The Prince and the Pauper
- The Prince of Atlantis
- Prudence Kitten
- A Pup Named Scooby-Doo
- The Puppy's Further Adventures (7 April 1986, 14 December 2001)
- Puppydog Tales
- Puzzle Trail

=== Q ===
- Q Pootle 5 (29 July 2013)
- The Quack Chat Show (16 February 1989, 10 June 1991)
- The Queen's Nose
- Quick Draw McGraw (24 December 1990, 24 August 1993)

=== R ===
- Raa Raa the Noisy Lion (9 May 2011)
- The Raccoons (4 March 1987, 13 December 2002)
- The Raccoons and the Lost Star (26 December 1983, 1 January 1992)
- The Raccoons on Ice (25 December 1982, 1 January 1993)
- The Racing Set
- Radio Roo
- Radio Studio Compise
- Rag, Tag and Bobtail
- Ragtime
- Rank the Prank
- Rastamouse (31 January 2011)
- Raven
- Raven: The Dragon's Eye
- Raven: The Island
- Raven: The Secret Temple
- Razzledazzle (14 February 2005)
- The Real Adventures of Jonny Quest
- The Really Wild Show
- Record Breakers
- The Red Hand Gang
- Relic: Guardians Of The Museum
- Remotely Funny
- Rentaghost
- The Return of the Psammead
- Return to Jupiter
- The Revenge Files of Alistair Fury
- Rewind
- The Rhyme Rocket
- Richard Hammond's Blast Lab
- Richie Rich
- Rimba's Island
- Roald Dahl's Revolting Recipes
- Roar
- Robinson Sucroe
- Rocket Boy and Toro
- Rocket's Island
- The Rocky and Bullwinkle Show
- Roger and Co
- Roland and Rattfink
- Roland Rat
- Rolf Harris Cartoon Time
- The Roly Mo Show
- The Roman Holidays
- Roman Mysteries
- Romuald the Reindeer
- Roobarb
- Roobarb and Custard Too
- Roswell Conspiracies
- Rotten Ralph
- Round the Twist
- Roy
- The Roy Files
- Rubbadubbers
- A Rubovian Legend
- Rude Dog and the Dweebs
- Ruff-Ruff, Tweet and Dave
- Rule The School
- Run the Risk
- Running Scared
- Rupert Bear

=== S ===
- S Club 7 Go Wild!
- S Club Juniors Summer Party
- S Club Search
- Saban's Adventures of Pinocchio
- Sadie J
- Salty
- Sam & Mark's Big Friday Wind-Up
- Sam and Mark's Guide to Dodging Disaster
- Sam and Mark's Sports Showdown
- Sam and the River
- Sam on Boffs' Island
- Same Smile
- Sarah & Duck
- The Sarah Jane Adventures
- Sarah Jane's Alien Files
- The Satellite Show
- Saturday Aardvark
- Saturday Mash-Up!
- The Saturday Picture Show
- Saturday Starts Here
- Saturday Superstore
- School For Stars
- School of Roars
- School of Silence
- Scooby-Doo and Scrappy-Doo
- Scooby-Doo! Mystery Incorporated
- The Scooby-Doo Show
- Scooby-Doo, Where Are You!
- Scoop
- Score with the Scaffold
- Scream Street
- Screen Test
- Seaview
- Secret Life of Boys
- Secret Life of Toys
- The Secret Show
- The Secret Saturdays
- Secret Squirrel
- Secret World
- See How They Run
- See It Saw It
- Sergeant Stripes
- Serious Amazon
- Serious Andes
- Serious Arctic
- Serious Desert
- Serious Jungle
- Serious Ocean
- Seriously Raleigh
- Sesame Tree
- Seven Little Australians
- Shakespeare: The Animated Tales
- The Shari Lewis Show
- Sheeep
- She-Ra and the Princesses of Power
- The Shiny Show
- Ship to Shore
- Shoebox Zoo
- Short Change
- Show and Spell
- Show Me What You're Made Of
- Sick as a Parrot
- Sidekick
- The Silver Brumby
- Silver Surfer
- Simon and the Witch
- The Singing Kettle
- Six Classic Fairy Tales
- Skate Nation
- Skeleton Warriors
- Sketchy Comedy
- Skip and Fuffy
- Skippy the Bush Kangaroo
- Skunk Fu!
- The Slammer
- Small Potatoes
- Smalltalk Diaries
- SMart
- Smart Guy
- SMarteenies
- Smile
- The Smoggies
- The Smokehouse
- The Smurfs
- Snailsbury Tales
- Snap!
- Snorks
- So Awkward
- So Little Time
- So You Want to be Top?
- The Sorcerer's Apprentice
- Sorry, I've Got No Head
- Space Ark
- Space Pirates
- Space Sentinels
- Spacevets
- The Sparticle Mystery
- Speed Buggy
- Speed Racer
- Spider
- Spider Riders
- Spider-Man (1981 TV series)
- Spider-Man (1994 TV series)
- Spider-Man and His Amazing Friends
- Spirit Warriors
- Splatalot!
- Spook Squad
- Spook Up!
- The Spooktacular New Adventures of Casper
- Sport Relief Does Glee Club
- Sportsround
- Spot Bots
- Spot the Dog
- Spot's Musical Adventures
- Spy Trap
- Square One Television
- The Stables
- Stacey Stone
- Stake Out (CBBC game show)
- Star Trek: The Animated Series
- Star Wars: Droids
- Star Wars: Ewoks
- Starhill Ponies
- Steel Riders
- Step Inside
- Stepping Up
- Stig of the Dump
- Stilgoe's On
- Stingray
- Stitch Up!
- Stone Protectors
- Stoppit and Tidyup
- The Story Makers
- The Story of the Treasure Seekers
- Storytime
- The Strange Affair of Adelaide Harris
- Strange Hill High 2013 - 2020
- Street Monsters
- Stuart Little: The Animated Series
- Student Bodies
- Studio E
- Stupid!
- Sub Zero
- Summer Camp Island (2021–2024)
- Summerhill
- Summerton Mill
- The Sunday Gang
- Super Duper Sumos
- Super Human Challenge
- Super Junior and Super Tank Show
- Super Rupert
- Superbods
- Superman: The Animated Series
- SuperTed
- Suspect
- Swamp Thing
- Swashbuckle
- SWAT Kats: The Radical Squadron
- Sweet Seventeen
- Sweet Valley High
- System 93

=== T ===
- T. and T.
- T.T.V.
- Take a Bow
- Take Hart
- Take That
- Take Two
- Taking the Next Step (13 June 2016)
- The Tale of Jack Frost (25 December 2004, 31 December 2009)
- Tales from Europe
- Tales of Aesop
- Tales of the Riverbank
- Tales of the Tooth Fairies (7 September 1993, 14 December 1993)
- Tales of a Wise King
- Tarzan, Lord of the Jungle (1 January 1977)
- Taz-Mania (21 December 1998)
- Tea with Grandma (14 September 1992, 9 November 1992)
- Teacher's Pet (movie only)
- Teacup Travels (9 February 2015, 13 January 2017)
- Technobabble
- Ted Sieger's Wildlife
- Teddles
- Teddy Edward (5 January 1973, 30 March 1973)
- Teddy Trucks (4 January 1994, 7 April 1994)
- TeddyBears
- Tee & Mo
- Teenage Mutant Hero Turtles (3 January 1990)
- TeleQuest (26 July 1999, 13 August 1999)
- Telescope
- Teletubbies (31 March 1997)
- Telling Tales
- Tellytales (9 March 2009)
- The Terrible Thunderlizards (20 August 1997, 12 December 1998)
- Testament: The Bible in Animation
- Theodore
- There's a Viking in My Bed
- These Are the Days
- Think of a Number
- This is Daniel Cook
- This is Emily Yeung
- Three Delivery
- Thumb Wrestling Federation(8 September 2007)
- ThunderCats (2 January 1987)
- Tik Tak
- Tikkabilla (14 October 2002, 27 January 2007)
- Time Busters
- Time for School
- Time Warp Trio (27 July 2007)
- Timeless Tales
- Timeless Tales from Hallmark
- Timmy Time (6 April 2009, 13 July 2012)
- Tinga Tinga Tales (1 February 2010, 31 March 2011)
- Tinpo
- Tiny and Mr Duck's Huge Show
- Tiny Tumble
- TMi (16 September 2006, 17 December 2010)
- To Me... To You...
- ToddWorld
- Tolibob
- Tom
- Tom and Jerry (4 April 1967)
- Tom & Jerry Kids (28 April 1998)
- Tom Tom
- Tommy Zoom
- Tom's Midnight Garden
- Toonatics
- Top Cat (16 May 1962, 1989)
- Top Class
- Top of the Form
- Top of the Pops Reloaded
- Topsy and Tim (11 November 2013)
- The Torch
- Totally Doctor Who (13 April 2006, 29 June 2007)
- Totally Rubbish
- Tottie: The Story of a Doll's House (7 February 1984, 30 December 1991)
- Tots TV (19 April 2004)
- Touché Turtle and Dum Dum (18 January 1978, 31 December 1979)
- Towser
- Toxic Crusaders (2 May 1992, 11 January 1995)
- Tracy Beaker Returns
- Tracy Beaker Survival Files
- Trading Places
- Transmission Impossible with Ed and Oucho
- Travel Bug
- A Traveller in Time
- Trapped!
- Treasure
- Treasure Champs
- Tree Fu Tom (5 March 2012, 3 October 2016)
- Tricks 'n' Tracks (9 April 1992, 29 September 1994)
- Tricky Business
- The Tripods (15 September 1984, 23 November 1985)
- Trollz (3 October 2005, 23 August 2008)
- Tronji (11 May 2009)
- Troublemakers
- The True Meaning of Crumbfest
- True Tilda (16 March 1997, 20 April 1997)
- Trumpton (3 January 1967, 28 March 1967)
- Tucker's Luck (10 March 1983, 17 December 1985)
- Tweenies (6 September 1999, 25 July 2002)
- Twin It to Win It (25 July 2016)
- The Twisted Whiskers Show (26 September 2009)
- Twirlywoos (23 February 2015)

=== U ===
- UGetMe
- UK Top 40
- Uki
- UKool
- Ultimate Book of Spells
- Ultimate Brain
- Ultimate Sports Day
- Ultimate Vets
- Ulysses 31 (7 November 1985, 22 July 1987)
- Uncle Jack
- Uncle Max
- Undercover Dads!
- Undercover Elephant (23 July 1980, 7 May 1982)
- The Underdog Show (20 March 2007, 30 July 2007)
- Underground Ernie
- Up on Our Street

=== V ===
- Val Meets The VIPs
- Valley of the Dinosaurs (4 February 1975, 5 February 1977)
- Victor & Maria
- Vision On
- Visionaries: Knights of the Magical Light (11 March 1989, 31 December 1989)
- Viva S Club
- Vote For Me
- The Voyages of Doctor Dolittle

=== W ===
- Wacky Races
- Waffle the Wonder Dog
- Wait For It...!
- Walk on the Wild Side
- Walking the Dog
- Wallace & Gromit (1989–present)
- Wallace & Gromit's World of Invention
- Wally Gator
- Watch
- The Watch House
- Watch My Chops!
- Watch with Mother
- Waterfalls
- Watt on Earth
- The Way Things Work
- Waybuloo
- The Wayne Manifesto
- We Are the Champions
- We Bare Bears
- What-a-Mess
- What? Where? When? Why?
- What's Inside?
- What's on Your Head?
- Where in the World
- Whirligig
- White Peak Farm
- Whizz
- Whizz Whizz Bang Bang
- Who, Sir? Me, Sir?
- Who Let the Dogs Out?
- Who Wants to Be a Superhero?
- Whoops I Missed the Bus
- Whoops I Missed Newsround
- Why 5
- Why Don't You?
- Wibbly Pig
- Wide-Eye
- Wiggly Park
- Wild
- Wild About Animals
- Wild and Weird
- The Wild House
- Wild Tales
- The Wild Thornberrys
- Wildbunch
- William's Wish Wellingtons
- Willo the Wisp
- Willy Fog 2
- Wingin' It
- Winsome Witch
- Wishbone
- Wishing
- W.I.T.C.H.
- The Wizard of Oz
- Wizards vs Aliens
- Wizbit
- Wolfblood
- Wolfblood Secrets
- Wolfblood Uncovered
- Wolverine and the X-Men
- The Wombles
- Wonderful World of Weird
- The Woodentops
- The Woody Woodpecker Show
- Woolly and Tig
- World of Happy
- The World of Peter Rabbit and Friends
- Worst Day of My Life
- The Worst Witch
- Worst Year of My Life Again
- Worzel Gummidge Turns Detective
- Wowser

=== X ===
- X-Men
- X-periMENTAL
- Xchange
- The X's

=== Y ===
- Yakka Dee (13 November 2017)
- Yo! Diary
- Yo Yogi!
- Yoho Ahoy
- Yoko! Jakamoko! Toto!
- Yolanda's Band Jam
- You and Me
- You Should Be So Lucky (19 February 1986, 11 February 1987)
- Young Dracula (21 September 2006)
- The Young Indiana Jones Chronicles (20 November 1994, 24 April 2005)
- Yvon of the Yukon (25 March 2002)

=== Z ===
- Zig and Zag
- Zigby
- Zingalong
- ZingZillas
- ZingZillas Zingbop
- Zokko!
- The Zeta Project
- Zombie Hotel
- The Zoo
- Zoo Factor
- Zoom

== BBC children's movie and special programmes ==
- The First Snow of Winter
- The Boy In The Dress
- Dustbin Baby
- Gangsta Granny
- Billionaire Boy
- Mr Stink
- The Littlest Angel
- Santa's Special Delivery
- Second Star to the Left
- The Tangerine Bear
- The True Meaning of Crumbfest
- Tracy Beaker: The Movie of Me
