= Let's Get Inventin' =

- Created by: Luke Nola
- Starring: Clinton Randell; Chris Stapp
- Narrated by: Peter Vegas
- Country of origin: New Zealand
- No. of episodes: 91

Production
- Executive producer: Luke Nola
- Running time: 22 minutes

Original release
- Network: TV2
- Release: 2006 – 2013

Let's Get Inventin' is a New Zealand reality television series that takes young inventors (aged 8 – 17) and helps them to create inventions. If successful they go into a prize pool, as well as having a chance to have their idea patented. In 2007, the series won the Qantas Award for best children's/youth programme. It has screened in over 72 countries. In 2014 the series was nominated for an International Emmy.

In Let's Get Inventin' over seven seasons 91 Kiwi kids with ideas have been teamed up with some of the greatest inventors in the country to bring their inventions to life. Rocket-powered ice skates, a six legged walking car and a jet-powered hover skateboard are some of the inventions with twelve having secured official patents. At the end of the series, the New Zealand public chooses their favorite invention for a prize package totalling $10,000; a trip to the UK; and a ride in the Aquada.

Let's Get Inventin' has been shown in 150 countries.

The BBC produced two versions of the New Zealand format: Whizz Whizz Bang Bang (2007) and Ed and Oucho's Excellent Inventions (2009 - 2010), which ran for two seasons.

Let’s get inventin’ mobile game

== Personalities ==
- Chris Knox
- King Kapisi
- Jonah Lomu
- David Tua
- Jason Gunn
- Sir Richard Hadlee
- Alan Gibbs
- Helen Clark
- John Key
- Mark Tilden
- Wallace & Gromit

== Season 1 Inventions ==
- Adam Gaston - Rocket Skates
- Sarah Trass - Buoyzone
- Rory Shillington - V8 Coffee
- Kristen Thomsen - Dogwalker
- Jason Wordsworth - Watergate
- John Shen - fresh Feet
- Kharn Gedge - Snow Scooter
- Jessie Lineham - Silent Hairdryer
- Sam Sinclair - Lacer Clips
- Isabella Coventry - Chord Companion
- Robert Wilson - Anti-Nervous Glasses
- Alex Drinkwater - Walking Cell-Phone Charger
- Ben Attwood - Super Bowl
- Natalie Crimp - UV Sensor
- Josh Murphy - Very Lazy Boy
- William Francis - Pogobike
- Emily Cooper - Downpipe Generator
- Ben Currie - Bush Balloon
- Mathew Selles - Hover board
- Krystal Cook - Woodcutting Machine
- Kyle White - Fish Tank Belt
- Ethan Hunter - Mossbot
- Justin Port and Brendan Port - Quad
- Brittany Smith-Frank - Magic Gadget

== Season 2 Episodes ==
- Episode 1- ‘The Teenager' Morning-O-Matic Get out of Bed Machine
- Episode 2 - Trajectory Gold
- Episode 3 - Acoustic Apparel
- Episode 4 - Trampoline Powered ‘Gyminator'.
- Episode 5 - The Super Poopa Sucker
- Episode 6 - Suitcase Car
- Episode 7 - The Can Man
- Episode 8 - The Choo Coob
- Episode 9 - The Flying Pack
- Episode 10 - Paper Blocks
- Episode 11- Bouncy Suit
- Episode 12 - Gravity Rollerskates
- Episode 13 - Hover Car
- Episode 14 - Electronic Money Bank
- Episode 15 - The Final Showdown - 'Inventor's Den'

== Season 7 Winner ==
- Scott Faville - ConeOrdinator

== Awards ==
2014 - 42nd International Emmy® Award Nomination

2013 – Finalist - Cynopsis Kids Imagination Awards New York

2012 – WINNER -Qantas Best Children’s/Youth TV Award

2009 – Finalist - Qantas Best Children’s/Youth TV Award

2008 – Finalist - Qantas Best Children’s/Youth TV Award

2007 – WINNER - Qantas Best Children’s/Youth TV Award

2007 - Finalist - Best Children's Programme Air New Zealand Screen Awards

2006 – WINNER - Qantas Best Children’s/Youth TV Award
