= Gristle =

Gristle may refer to:

- In butchery and gastronomy, various tough and inedible meat tissues
  - Cartilage, connective tissue
  - Fascia, connective tissue sheaths
  - Epimysium, fibrous tissue surrounding many muscles
- Throbbing Gristle, an English avant-garde music and visual arts group
- Gristle (G.I. Joe), a fictional villain in the G.I. Joe universe
- Puppy Gristle, a 2002 album by Skinny Puppy
- The House of Gristle, a 1994 British television series
