= Wonderful World of Weird =

2007 British children's TV programme

Wonderful World of Weird was a British children's television programme shown on BBC Two. Hosted by Ed Petrie and featuring Ortis Deley, Lizzie Greenwood and Jake Humphrey. It ran for three weeks, from February 2007 to March 2007. It was a game show where contestants tried to find the weirdest thing on their topic .

== Teams ==
The teams are called the Flying Pigs, Chilli Rockets and Sofa Giraffes, composed of a CBBC presenter and a child, who stayed on for a week (Ed himself also had a child who was his 'assistant' for the week).

== Format ==
Each show has three rounds, the second involving finding things for the Map of Weird, and the third called the Random Word Round. Ironically, on the first show, the random word was 'word'.

When every round was over, the studio audience would move over to the team they thought should win. Ed would then 'count' the number of people surrounding each team. The scores were announced by numbers on pairs of pants on a washing line. The colour of the pants corresponded to the team colours.

Every Friday there was a random pick for each teams topic, spanning the entire week and the last round was Week's Weirdest Wonder, where each team chose their favourite presentation of the week.

Every shows' winner won a humorous object, such as a stick of celery and a flowery hat. The show always ended by Ed saying 'It's not over til...' which was followed by an action (e.g. '...until the audience sit down'). Once the action was performed, the show was declared finished.

== Music ==
The theme tune for Wonderful World of Weird was written by Martin Medina, who has composed several themes including Rip Off Britain, Short Change, The Pod, Superleague Formula, Jo Brand's Christmas Log and Don't Log Off.
