= Anne Foy =

British TV presenter (born 1986)

- Born: 23 January 1986 (age 39); Langold, Nottinghamshire, England
- Occupation(s): TV presenter, actress
- Years active: 2001–present

Anne Foy (born 23 January 1986 in Langold, Worksop) is a children's television presenter for the BBC. Until March 2008, she worked for the CBBC Channel and on CBBC. She can currently be heard as the voiceover on the music channel 4Music.

== Recent work ==
Anne has been presenting CBBC weekdays on BBC One or on CBBC Extra on Saturday mornings. Anne appears on Stitch Up!, setting up unsuspecting members of the public to be humiliated for the benefit of the cameras. She has made appearances on The Saturday Show and in the summer of 2003 she presented Britain's Amazing Mates. Anne is the voice of the female veterinarian in CBBC's online game "Vet Set Go" and hosted the BIG GIG 2005 (an event with over 21,000 girl guides). In the Easter holidays, Anne carried out various tasks for the entertainment of CBBC viewers such as abseiling down a cliff face and learning to drive a tractor. Anne had also done some radio work on BBC 7's The Big Toe Show.

Anne was spotted by a CBBC producer in 2001 after appearing on a CBBC show called DIY TV, hosted by Josie d'Arby, where young people made their own television show. Anne went on to present the hidden-camera show, Stitch Up!. In between causing Mayhem on the streets and dressing in a series of ridiculous costumes, Anne went on to star in the CBBC sitcom Bad Penny playing the lead role. It wasn't long before CBBC asked her to guest-present their summer location tour in 2003, with Anne becoming a full-time face on CBBC in early 2004. She left CBBC in March 2008.

== Personal life ==
Foy married Sam Nixon in December 2012. They have a daughter, Meridon (born in 2014), and a son, Doyle together.
