= Rowland Lee (composer) =

British music composer

Rowland Edward Lee (born 19 August 1960) is a composer, pianist and conductor. In addition to his many published concert works, he is also one of the UK's premier TV, theatre and media composers and musical arrangers with over 600 episodes of various series and short films to his credit. Lee is perhaps best known for writing the theme song of the animated TV series Pablo the Little Red Fox, 64 Zoo Lane and for his orchestration of Sir Matthew Bourne's Swan Lake which is currently the most performed dance production in the world.

== Early life ==
Lee was born in Woking, Surrey to parents Brian and Dilys Lee (née Lucas). He attended Sheerwater Secondary School then transferred to Woking Boys Grammar School and Woking VI Form College. From 1978-1982 Lee was organist and choirmaster of Christ Church, Woking. From 1979-1984 Lee attended The Royal College of Music studying music composition (under the tutelage of Joseph Horovitz and Philip Cannon), piano and conducting. In 1982 Lee was elected president of the Royal College’s Student Association in the College's centenary year. He graduated with Honours in 1984.

== Career ==
Prior to graduation from the Royal College of Music, Lee was approached by the Royal College of Art to compose soundtracks for two films by then animation student, Janet Simmonds. The short films entitled: The Waterfall and Merlin, taken together, won Lee the 1986 British Film Institute's Anthony Asquith Young Composer Award. This marked the reinstitution of this prize which has been awarded every year since. Subsequently, this led to Lee's writing extensively for animation films and TV soundtracks. In addition to his work in animation, Lee has composed and arranged for Ballet, Musical Theatre and both secular and religious concert music.

== Animation ==
- Cloudbabies
- Pablo the Little Red Fox (1999)
- Wilf the Witch's Dog (2002)
- 64 Zoo Lane (1999-2000)
- Salut Serge
- Engie Benjy
- Crapston Villas
- The Little Reindeer
- Captain Abercromby
- Henry's Cat

== Theatre ==
- A Spoonful of Sherman
- Bumblescratch
- Ann Veronica
- The Amazons
- Vanity Fair
- Marry Me a Little
- Ruthless!
- Swan Lake

== Concert Music ==
- Requiem
- Elegy
- Oboe Sonata
- Violin Concerto
- Snow Dance (Celesta Concerto)

== Awards ==
- The Amazons CD received a Grammy Award nomination for "Best Cast Album".
- In 1985 Lee became the first recipient of the British Film Institute’s Anthony Asquith Young Composer Award.
