= Kate Heavenor =

Scottish actress and television presenter

- Born: Kate Mary Elizabeth Heavenor; 2 August 1980 (age 44)
- Occupation: Broadcaster & actress
- Years active: 1998-present
- Spouse: Daniel Diaz

Kate Diaz (née Heavenor; born 2 August 1980, in Glasgow) is a Scottish actress and television presenter. She is best known for her work presenting live children's television on CBBC. Since 2006 she has been the principal at Southgate and Enfield Stagecoach Theatre Arts.

Heavenor grew up in Pollokshields, Glasgow. She attended Craigholme School, an independent school for girls, and trained at the Royal Scottish Academy of Music and Drama.

== Television ==
While still studying Heavenor began her career at BBC Scotland co-presenting Saturday morning children's television show The Crew Room for BBC Choice. She went on to present Sunday morning children's programme Fully Booked and the technology series Hyperlinks at BBC Scotland. She relocated to London to pursue her television work and presented Studio Disney on the Disney Channel before spending six years presenting on Children's BBC. Her work includes FBi, a live flagship children's programme, and science show Eureka TV. Heavenor's natural aptitude for live television saw her go on to present CBBC's live Comic Relief Show from the Camden Roundhouse, Children in Need live from Inverness and as a daily continuity presenter on CBBC. After leaving CBBC she continued in live television, co-presented It's a Girl Thing on Sky Mix, Daily Play for the National Lottery and Live Roulette from 2008 to 2010 on SuperCasino.

In 2001 Heavenor voiced the titular character in the BBC Two show Captain Abercromby.

== Theatre ==
Heavenor performed in several pantomimes, playing the title role in Cinderella at the Empire Theatre, Sunderland in 2003, Snow White in Snow White and the Seven Dwarves at the White Rock Theatre, Hastings, in 2004, and Fairy Crystal in Snow White & the Seven Dwarfs at Southport Theatre in 2006.

In December 2022 Heavenor played the principle role of Alice Beineke in Springers AODS production of The Addams Family Musical at the Brentwood Theatre, Essex.

== Personal life ==
Heavenor had a son in December 2010 and a daughter in early 2015.

Her father is a retired dentist and inventor known for developing a novel ergonomic handle design.
