= Angelmouse =

British children's TV programme

- Genre: Children's; Cartoon; Comedy
- Created by: Rodney Peppé
- Written by: Jez Hall, Mark Mason
- Directed by: Mark Mason
- Voices of: David Jason
- Narrated by: David Jason
- Opening theme: "Angel Mouse, Angel Mouse!"
- Ending theme: "Angel Mouse, Angel Mouse!"
- Composer: Kick Production
- Country of origin: United Kingdom
- Original language: English
- No. of seasons: 1
- No. of episodes: 26

Production
- Executive producer: Theresa Plummer-Andrews
- Producer: Jackie Edwards
- Editor: Paul Coppock
- Running time: 5 minutes per episode (approx.)
- Production companies: Silver Fox Films; BBC Worldwide

Original release
- Network: CBBC
- Release: 27 September 1999 – 31 March 2000

Angelmouse is a 1999 British children's television programme which was produced and broadcast by the BBC, based on a character created by author and illustrator Rodney Peppé. The character is a cheeky cartoon mouse who had demonstrated caring for others and other positive social values.

It was aired on CBBC and CBeebies (both the separate channel and CBeebies on BBC One and BBC Two). It has also been broadcast on ABC Kids. It started from 27 September 1999 and ended on 31 March 2000.

There were also Angelmouse books and plush toys available in the United Kingdom.

== Characters ==
- Angelmouse – A young mouse who is an angel. He lives on earth with his friend Quilly, and receives missions to do good deeds from "You-know-who" (God). He has wings and a "thingamajig" (halo), which is loose and can slip, shrink, wobble or even disappear when he misbehaves or neglects his mission. His Thingamajig can also mend things and solve problems.
- Quilly the Bird – A talking bird, who gives Angelmouse advice and always prompts him to start or continue his missions. He is also the narrator of each episode.
- Elliemum – A sensible, kind and cheerful elephant and the mother of Baby Ellie who highly regards Angelmouse as a 'real angel'.
- Baby Ellie – Elliemum's baby elephant, who likes to play and join in the fun.
- Oswald – A duck, who loves to speed especially on roller-skates. He often says "No Brakes!" as he whizzes by.
- Spencer – A dotty teddy bear, who frequently drives a car.
- Little Petal – A rag doll, who runs a little shop.
- Hutchkin – A rabbit, who stays in his burrow most of the time.
- Other Angels – The angels that live in Heaven and are seen to attend Angel School, a school meant for angels that teaches them how to be good, paint rainbows, and go through the pearled gates of Heaven.

(They made their first appearance in the episode "My Friend Angelmouse")

- Angel Teacher – The teacher of all of the angels, he first appeared in the episode "My Friend Angelmouse", revealing that he sometimes gets annoyed when Angelmouse makes a mistake.
- You-know-who – He is actually God; he is referred to throughout the series as You-know-who by both Angelmouse and Quilly (and possibly the other characters). He is never shown on screen or says anything; despite this, he sends Angelmouse missions by a piece of paper that flies with wings above it. Since He is God, it is believed that He is not a man, and has no shape or form.

(Whenever Angelmouse's Thingamajig disappears when he makes a mistake, it is possible that You-know-who is responsible for taking the Thingamajig away as Angelmouse's punishment for some sort.)

- The Weather Angels – 3 angels that often deal with the weather.
  - The Sun Angel – He has the sun power of sunlight/daylight.
  - The Wind Angel – He has the ability to provide wind by taking a deep breath and blowing the wind out of his mouth.
  - The Rain Angel – He has the power to provide rain to Earth.

(Unlike the other angels, the Weather Angels do not have wings, robes, or halos, but are seen as spirits that deal with weather often.)

- The Post Angel
  - An angel that deals with the Seventh Heaven Newspaper.

== Episodes ==
No.	Title	Original release date
1	"My Friend, Angelmouse"	27 September 1999
Angelmouse rushes into Quilly in hope of passing the test of helping someone to qualify as an angel. He finally helps Quilly himself and gains his Thingamajig.
2	"Lost Thingamajig"	4 October 1999
Angelmouse has lost his Thingamajig. As he searches for it, he mistakes other hoops for it. When he saves Baby Ellie from a pond, he earns it back.
3	"Important Message"	11 October 1999
Angelmouse gets a curtailed message. He has to return a cloth which has no forwarding owner. Angelmouse learns the benefit of helping others when he returns it to Baby Ellie.
4	"Windy Weather Day"	18 October 1999
On a very windy day, Angelmouse goes to Cloud 9 where he rescues Little Petal along with other people's items that had been blown away.
5	"Trumpet"	25 October 1999
Angelmouse receives a trumpet, but doesn't realise he's supposed to teach Baby Ellie how to play it. However, Oswald accidentally breaks it, but Baby Ellie picks up from bubble blowing.
6	"Baby Ellie's Presents"	1 November 1999
Angelmouse tries to choose a present for Baby Ellie's birthday. The whole village gets presents that she doesn't like, but Angelmouse manages to give her what she really wanted.
7	"Angel Cake"	8 November 1999
Angelmouse is requested to get a special cake for Elliemum, but he loses it to Hutchkin, so Angelmouse and Quilly make one with a little magic for Elliemum's tea time.
8	"Copycat Chick"	15 November 1999
Angelmouse has to find a home for a chick that copies his every move. No one but Elliemum and Baby Ellie are suitable carers for her.
9	"Night Flight"	22 November 1999
At night, Angelmouse helps Hutchkin find Cloud Cuckoo Land. Hutchkin finally reaches it when he falls asleep.
10	"Cloud Nine"	29 November 1999
A grumpy Angelmouse travels with Oswald to the Seventh Heaven Post office. He gets Elliemum her lily seeds and helps them grow.
11	"Angelmouse's Day Off"	6 December 1999
It's Angelmouse's day off, but he is bored and has nothing to do. He gets stuck trying to get some honey, but Quilly and all the village members come to his rescue.
12	"Angelmouse's Reward"	5 January 2000
Angelmouse looks around to help people to earn a nice reward, but Quilly thinks he's causing trouble. When they get home, however, they find a nice surprise for Angelmouse, a harp.
13	"Guardian Angelmouse"	12 January 2000
Angelmouse has to babysit Baby Ellie, but would rather go flying in Oswald's aeroplane. Angelmouse gets his chance when Baby Ellie warns him, Oswald's aeroplane is out of control.
14	"A Visitor for Angelmouse"	19 January 2000
Angelmouse is assigned to help a visitor to go home. Angelmouse and his friends have trouble trying to find his place, but Hutchkin has the answer to the problem.
15	"The Rainy Day"	26 January 2000
Hutchkin is stuck inside his flooded home. With the aid of his Thingamajig and a kite, Angelmouse gets Hutchkin out.
16	"The Missing Message"	2 February 2000
Angelmouse's message along with several other stuff has disappeared. Oswald is revealed to have taken the stuff while airplane fishing and got stranded on Cloud Six.
17	"Can't Sleep, Won't Sleep"	16 February 2000
As Angelmouse tries to help Baby Ellie get to sleep, his mission soon turns into a slumber party, until a night-light helps Baby Ellie fall asleep.
18	"The Flyaway Feather"	23 February 2000
Angelmouse is out to find Oswald's feather. Along the way, something is making Baby Ellie sneeze repeatedly.
19	"Ice Cream Clouds"	1 March 2000
On a hot day, Angelmouse is sent to get Baby Ellie some ice-cream, but there doesn't seem to be any. Oswald upon crashing his plane finds an ice-cream cloud.
20	"The Rainbow Paint"	8 March 2000
Spencer donates Angelmouse's old stuff for a jumble sale, but his rainbow paint is soon mixed up in the lot. Angelmouse hurries to get it back before it rains.
21	"Head in the Clouds"	15 March 2000
Angelmouse is sent to help Spencer, but he cannot quite find him. He soon stumbles across Spencer, who is mountain climbing.
22	"The Can't Stop Duck"	17 March 2000
Angelmouse derelicts his duties to see Oswald drive his new car which he's supposed to stop. However he is unfortunately going to have to do it without his 'Thingamajig'.
23	"The Wishing Star"	22 March 2000
Angelmouse is sent to help Baby Ellie, but not knowing what to do, consults the wishing star for advice.
24	"Bouncing Elliemum"	24 March 2000
Elliemum has a problem with talent for a contest, so Angelmouse consults his friends for some ideas. Finally Angelmouse suggests bouncing on a cloud.
25	"The Weather Angels"	29 March 2000
Little Petal's shop is in a complete mess. Unable to clean it directly, Angelmouse gets the Weather Angels to clean it with wind, rain and sunshine.
26	"The Missing Skates"	31 March 2000
Oswald's skates have gone missing. The Winter Angel at the Pole Star provides two pairs of skates for Oswald and Little Petal as well as a hat for Angelmouse.

== Releases ==
VHS:

- "My Friend Angelmouse" (2000) - (My Friend Angelmouse, Lost Thingamajig, Windy Weather Day, Trumpet, Baby Ellie's Presents, Angelcake, Copycat Chick, Angelmouse's Day Off, A Visitor For Angelmouse, Angelmouse's Reward)

DVD:

- "Angelmouse - The Complete Series" (2006), Exclusive in Australia - (All 26 episodes)
- "Angelmouse: Angelmouse's Reward, A Visitor for Angelmouse and other stories" (2006) - (Angelmouse's Reward, A Visitor for Angelmouse, The Rainy Day, Can't Sleep Won't Sleep, Guardian Angelmouse)

== See also ==
- BBC
- CBeebies
- List of BBC children's television programmes
