= Transmission Impossible with Ed and Oucho =

Television series

- Genre: Comedy
- Country of origin: United Kingdom
- Original language: English
- No. of series: 1
- No. of episodes: 26

Production
- Running time: 89 mins

Original release
- Network: BBC Two (Saturdays); CBBC Channel (Sundays)
- Release: 16 May – 9 August 2009

Transmission Impossible With Ed and Oucho is a CBBC show starring Ed Petrie and Oucho T. Cactus. Filmed at Pinewood Studios, it first aired on 16 May 2009 and was shown every Saturday morning on BBC Two and Sunday morning on the CBBC Channel for its run of 26 episodes. Transmission Impossible with Ed and Oucho ended on 9 August 2009 to allow Ed and Oucho to film Series 2 of Excellent Inventions.

== Premise ==
The premise involved Ed and Oucho "hacking" into "your television" from their blimp, replacing The Krazey, Krazey, Krazey, Krazey, Krazey, Krazey, Krazey Show with Kaptain Krazey and Nigel Smith intended to be on air. Kaptain Krazey was a puppet pirate that only says "ooh aar" whilst Nigel Smith was Ed Petrie in a blonde wig.

Each Saturday episode, their blimp loses altitude, and one by one their four stowaways have to be pushed off. The stowaways play games, e.g. "Oucho's lossoli (Lovely) quiz", to determine who gets pushed off and whether or not they are awarded a parachute.

== Programmes ==
The Saturday episodes include (Broadcast on BBC Two at 10am and available on BBC iPlayer):

- The Pinky and Perky Show
- The Secret Show
- The Legend of Dick and Dom

The Sunday editions feature (Broadcast on the CBBC Channel at 10am but not available on BBC iPlayer):

- Eliot Kid
- The Owl (Episodes 6 & 12 only)
- Sorry, I've Got No Head
- Horrible Histories (Originally repeated from BBC One Thursday)

== Episodes ==
No.	Title	Original release date	Prod. code
1	"Episode One"	16 May 2009	1.1
Ed and Oucho find four stowaways on the blimp (then throw them off). Games include Cake Face, Oucho's Lossoli Quiz and Security. Ted Metrie Sketch is "Blue Metrie" in the Blue Peter garden.
2	"Episode Two"	17 May 2009	1.2
Bed and Breakfast man stowed away. Monsieur Pamplemousse and Turkey Chef visit kids house. Ed feeds Oucho's drawings and models of the blimp to the furnace. Oucho sings Girls Aloud's "The Promise" in Oucho's Sing-A-Long.
3	"Episode Three"	23 May 2009	1.3
Builder breaks more than he fixes (special guest David Reed) and eventually gets sucked down the toilet. Discover four stowaways. Games include Dolly Parton Karaoke, Saturday Sundae, Oucho's Lossoli Quiz. Ted Metrie Really Serious sketch.
4	"Episode Four"	24 May 2009	1.4
Oucho forces Ed to play hide and seek, in which he is squashed in the toilet. A mysterious man is dancing on the roof. Oucho sings The Noisettes' "Don't Upset the Rhythm (Go Baby Go)".
5	"Episode Five"	30 May 2009	1.5
The boys discover that the hamster could help power the blimp, but he goes on the loose so they chase after him. They find four more stowaways. Termites (Bob and Babs, the latter played by Louise Gold) are eating the wood. Games include Oucho's lossoli quiz and hamster attraction.
6	"Episode Six"	31 May 2009	1.6
Uncle Fronk pays a visit, but the Big Big Cheese calls about giving him his own show. The man is still dancing on the roof. Oucho and Fronk duet High School Musical's "Breaking Free" in Oucho's Sing-A-Long.
7	"Episode Seven"	6 June 2009	1.7
Woman called Mabel comes from a dating channel. Ed finds stowaways. Games include finding rings in cakes. Ed finds a ring pull and Mabel thinks he's proposing. They suddenly become engaged. Will they get married?
8	"Episode Eight"	7 June 2009	1.8
Ted Metrie is in the newspapers so Ed and Oucho decide to do something controversial – Oucho shows his "bum" (the base of his pot). Will they make the headlines? Oucho sings The Saturdays' "Just Can't Get Enough" in Oucho's Sing-A-Long.
9	"Episode Nine"	13 June 2009	1.9
Ed and Oucho "look-a-likes" appear on the blimp. Ed and Oucho tied up. They find stowaways. They play games such as "Oucho's lossoli quiz". They watch Ted Metrie sketch "Really Serious". Oucho sings Katy Perry's "Hot n Cold" as Oucho's Sing-A-Long debuts on a Saturday.
10	"Episode Ten"	14 June 2009	1.10
Oucho sets up a charity. Ed decides to join in. They give people advice on the phone. They feed children's artwork to their furnace. Ed's mum phones the show for advice from Oucho's Agony Aunt segment.
11	"Episode Eleven"	20 June 2009	1.11
They find stowaways. A Ringmaster comes onto the blimp. He wants Ed to join him in the circus as an "amazing horse faced man". They play games such as "Oucho's lossoli quiz". Oucho sings Lady Gaga's "Poker Face" in Oucho's Sing-A-Long. Part 1 of I-Banana The Musical with Anthony Duffle-Coat.
12	"Episode Twelve"	21 June 2009	1.12
The boys run out of food, they try everything to get some. Peter Sensible from the AAAAA (Airship Aviation Activation and Authorisation Authority) is on to them. Peter Sensible is Ed dressed up. They burn children's artwork for fuel and read e-mails.
13	"Episode Thirteen"	27 June 2009	1.13
Sports Day theme. They find stowaways. They look at children's socks and hang them on a washing line at their item "Sock This". Part 2 of I-Banana. Oucho sings "Girls" by the Sugababes in his Sing-A-Long. Peter Sensible is on their case again.
14	"Episode Fourteen"	28 June 2009	1.14
The blimp is taken over by a Jonas Brothers fan who thinks that Ed is Joe Jonas. Oucho thinks he is Kevin Jonas. A mop is confused for Nick Jonas.
15	"Episode Fifteen"	4 July 2009	1.15
Ed's attempt at a British-themed episode, complete with Morris dancing, is thwarted when the blimp is invaded by the show's American counterpart Transmission OK. Oucho performs Britney Spears' "Womanizer" in "Oucho's Sing-A-Long". Ted Metrie cameos in the third part of I-Banana.
16	"Episode Sixteen"	5 July 2009	1.16
Oucho tricks Ed into using his credit card to pay for the subscription TV channel Cactus TV and watches Cactus EastEnders, Private Cacti and Cactus Doctor Who. Ed mistakenly tunes into Ted Metrie's new 24/7 TV channel Ted Metrie 24. They film a staged home video blooper to send into You've Been Prickled and earn £250 (and a banana) to pay the Cactus TV bill.
17	"Episode Seventeen"	11 July 2009	1.17
Cheerleading female cactus Flutie secretly steals objects from the blimp (such as socks, a laptop, a cactus Mona Lisa and Ed's golden phone) and leads the boys to think that the stowaways did it. Oucho performs will.i.am and Cheryl Cole's "Heartbreaker" in "Oucho's Sing-A-Long". The fourth and final edition of I-Banana ends with the Mexican-style musical number "Bananas, I Love Bananas".
18	"Episode Eighteen"	12 July 2009	1.18
Oucho is travel sick when the blimp is caught in a thunder storm, whilst Ed pretends not to be frightened. Repeat of Ted Metrie climbing to the top of a multi-storey car park in Really Serious on Ted Metrie 24. Ed asks children to send in hoax pictures of the blimp in "Ed's Great Big Spot" (codename – The Dininskie Project) to confuse Peter Sensible about the blimp's whereabouts.
19	"Episode Nineteen"	18 July 2009	1.19
Sally the Yeti hunter invades the blimp when it crashes on a mountain (probably Ben Nevis) in the Scottish Highlands. Ted Metrie hosts the Top Gear-inspired Ted Gear. Oucho performs Take That's "Rule the World" in his Sing-A-Long. The episode ends with a cliffhanger as a real Yeti appears to emerge from the engine room.
20	"Episode Twenty"	19 July 2009	1.20
The Yeti from the previous episode turns out to be a silhouette of feather boas and a dressing gown on a hat stand. Oucho sets fire to the floor to keep warm, which inadvertently melts the top of the mountain the blimp was stuck on, freeing it but leaving a large hole. Ed attempts to use a cardboard cut-out of Tess Daly to patch up the hole but falls out of the blimp in the process.
21	"Episode Twenty One"	25 July 2009	1.21
Ed and Oucho find four stowaways on the blimp (then throw them off). Games include Bubbly Bubbly, Oucho's Lossoli Quiz and Security. The rapper Tim Safe (a.k.a. SAFE-T) from the AAAAA comes on board to inspect the blimp's Health and Safety. JLS' single "Beat Again" is sung on "Oucho's Sing-A-Long".
22	"Episode Twenty Two"	26 July 2009	1.22
Ed and Oucho inadvertently stop the blimp in the airspace of an important international airport whilst trying to enjoy a lazy Sunday. The photos sent in for "Ed's Great Big Spot" cause Peter Sensible's Blimp Tracking machinery to explode, leading to him getting the sack. Oucho debuts his new item "Oucho's Thought of the Day", asking to BBC Radio 4's "Thought for the Day". Ed is forced to move the blimp to avoid a Blimp-Seeking Missile launched by air traffic control, spotted by Oucho during a game of I spy.
23	"Episode Twenty Three"	1 August 2009	1.23
Whilst preparing to take a holiday on Ted Metrie's Metrie Island, Ed unwittingly frees the "auto pilot" from his box under the desk. Kaptain Krazey is cancelled after Nigel Smith's possessions are repossessed. Oucho sings "Number 1" by Tinchy Stryder featuring N-Dubz in "Oucho's Sing-A-Long". Ed loses 'Paper, scissors, stone' and becomes the new auto pilot.
24	"Episode Twenty Four"	2 August 2009	1.24
Ed and Oucho's Blimp slowly disintegrates and they find the termites. They attempt to use 'The exterminator', although they fail. They do the furnace and at the end, their blimp fills up with the exterminator's white gas.
25	"Episode Twenty Five"	8 August 2009	1.25
Ed and Oucho reminisce about the series' highlights whilst trying to fix the blimp after Oucho removes an essential banana from the wall.
26	"Episode Twenty Six"	9 August 2009	1.26
Ed and Oucho crash land the blimp in a park and reminisce once again about the series' highlights whilst packing. They leave the blimp for a meeting with the Big Big Cheese and end with a montage of memorable moments.
