= Rodney Peppé =

British author of children's books (1934–2022)

- Born: 24 June 1934; Eastbourne, England
- Died: 27 October 2022 (aged 88)
- Occupations: Author, illustrator
- Spouse: Tatjana Tekkel (1960–2022)
- Children: Christen Rodney, Jonathan Noel
- Writing career
- Period: 1934–2022
- Genres: Children's fiction, crafts

Rodney Darrell Peppé (24 June 1934 – 27 October 2022) was a British author and illustrator in the children's fiction and crafts genres. He was the author and illustrator of more than 80 children's books, publishing his first children's book in 1968 The Alphabet Book with Constable Young Books. His craft books teach how to build mechanical toys and automata.

While he created toys and automata, Peppé did not sell his creations; his works were on display in various museums and on tour in his one-man show The Wonderful World of Rodney Peppé.

== Early life ==
Born on 24 June 1934 in Eastbourne, England, Peppé was the twin brother of Mark and son of Lionel Hill Peppé and Winifred Vivienne (Parry). Although born in Eastbourne, due to the career of Lionel in the British Royal Navy and Royal Indian Navy the family lived in India near the Himalaya Mountains during the children's early years. In 1942 when Vivienne returned with the twins to Eastbourne, Rodney and his brother Mark were enrolled in boarding school at St Bede's School, Sussex.

After achieving a National Diploma in Design in 1958 from the Eastbourne School of Art, and a Diploma in Illustration in 1959 from the London County Council Central School of Arts and Crafts, Peppé was soon employed and married.

== Early career ==
Before publishing his first children's book The Alphabet Book in 1968, Peppé was employed as an art director for S. H. Benson and J. Walter Thompson in 1960 (ending in 1965), a consultant designer for Ross Foods Ltd. in 1965 (ending in 1973), and as a freelance graphic designer and illustrator in 1965 (lasting to the present day).

== Personal life ==
Peppé married textile artist Tordis Tatjana Tekkel on 16 July 1960. They had two sons, Christen Rodney and Jonathan Noel. After marriage and children, Peppé and his family lived in various locations in England including Surrey, Whiteway, and Torquay.

Peppé died on 27 October 2022, at the age of 88.

== Bibliography ==
This is a partial list of works by Peppé.

=== Huxley Pig series ===
- Here Comes Huxley Pig (1989)
- The Adventures of Huxley Pig (1989)
- Huxley Pig at the Beach (1989)
- Huxley Pig at the Restaurant (1989)
- Huxley Pig's Aeroplane (1989)
- Huxley Pig the Clown (1989)
- Huxley Pig in the Haunted House (1989)
- Huxley Pig at the Circus (1989)
- Huxley Pig's Dressing Up Book
- Huxley Pig Makes a Movie
- Huxley Pig's Motor Car
- Huxley Pig on a Desert Island

=== Angelmouse series ===
- Cloud Nine (1999, Storybook 1)
- Windy Weather Day (1999, Storybook 2)
- Lost Thingamajig (1999, Storybook 3)
- An Important Message (1999, Storybook 4)
- Angelcake (2000, Storybook 5)
- My Friend Angelmouse (2000, Storybook 6)
- Missing Skates (2000)
- Rainbow Paint (2000)
- Be Good Angelmouse (2002)
- You're a Good Friend Quilly (2002)
- What Do You Like Baby Ellie? (2002)
- Be Careful, Oswald (2002)

==== Angelmouse series novelty and activity books ====
- The Special Package (1999, Activity Book)
- Baby Ellie's Presents (2000, Novelty Peep-Through Window Book)
- Angelmouse Coloring Book (2002)
- Fun With Angelmouse Sticker Book (2002)

==== My Surprise Pull-out Word Book series ====
- Indoors (1980)
- Outdoors (1980)

==== Mice series ====
- The Mice Who Lived in a Shoe (1981)
- The Kettleship Pirates (1983)
- The Mice and the Flying Basket (1985)
- The Mice and the Clockwork Bus (1986)
- The Mice on the Moon (1992)
- The Mice and the Travel Machine (1993)

==== Little Toy Board Books series ====
- Little Circus (1983)
- Little Dolls (1983)
- Little Games (1983)
- Little Numbers (1983)
- Little Wheels (1983)

==== Other ====
- The Alphabet Book (1968)
- Circus Numbers: A Counting Book (1969)
- The House That Jack Built (1970)
- Hey Riddle Diddle: A Book of Traditional Riddles (1971)
- Cat and Mouse: A Book of Rhymes (1973)
- Odd One Out (1974)
- Puzzle Book (1977)
- Block Book. Animals (1985)
- The Magic Toy Box (1996)

== Television ==
Two of Rodney Peppé's children's book series have been adapted for animated television.

- Huxley Pig (1989–1990)
- Angelmouse (1999–2000)

In a 1982 episode of The Friendly Giant Circus Fun, the Giant reads aloud from the book Circus Numbers.
