= Ed Petrie =

English actor (born 1978)

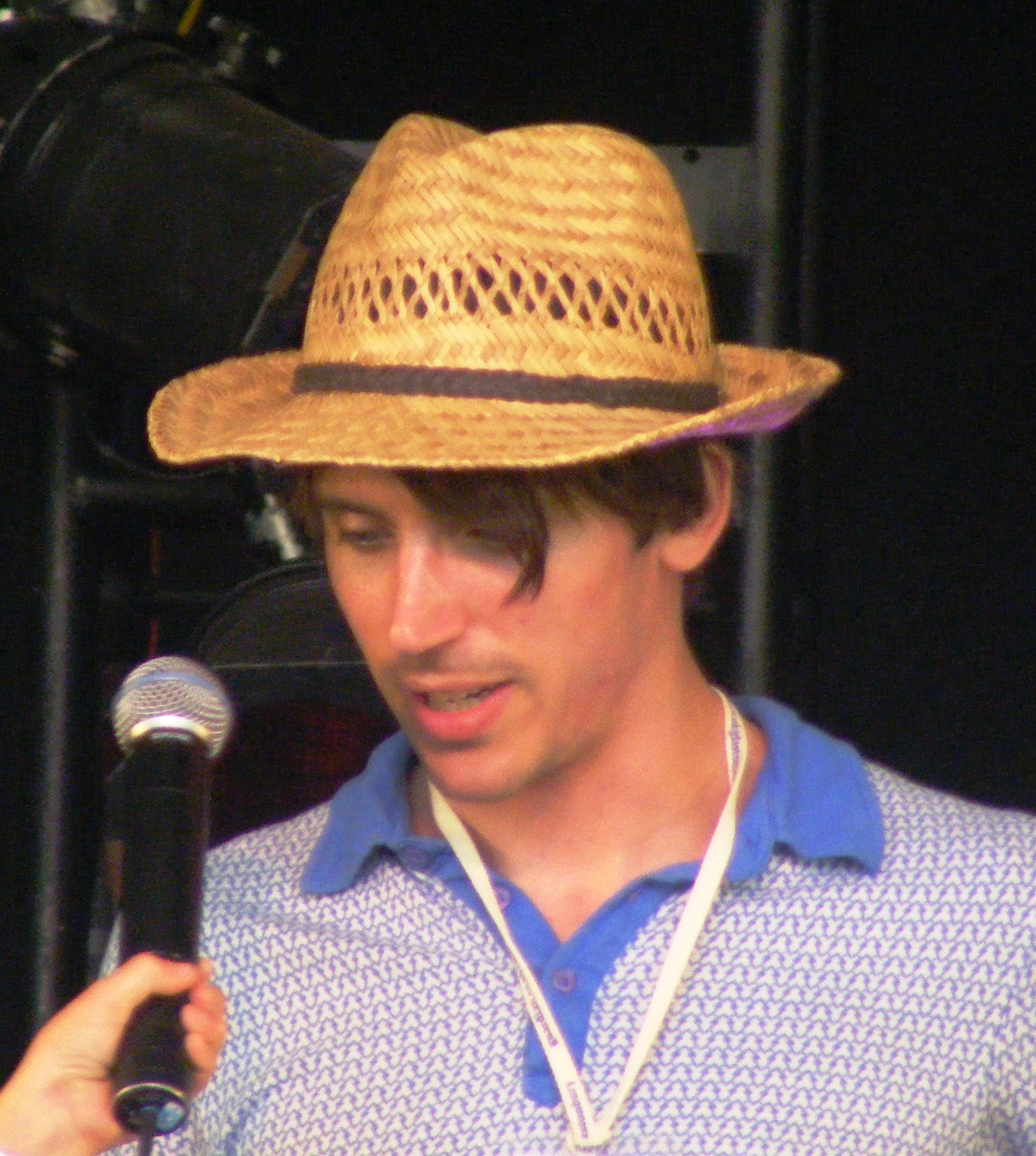
- Petrie at the 2010 Glastonbury Festival
- Born: Edward Oliver James Petrie; 22 August 1978 (age 47); Rustington, West Sussex, England
- Occupations: Actor, comedian, television presenter

Edward Oliver James "Ed" Petrie (/ˈpiːtri/; born 22 August 1978) is an English actor, comedian, and television presenter.

== Early life ==
Petrie was born and raised in Rustington, West Sussex. He was educated at Broadwater Manor in Worthing, West Sussex, and the independent school Ardingly College in Ardingly, West Sussex.

== Career ==
Previous presenting work for Petrie includes hosting various children's programmes on Nickelodeon from January 2005 until September 2007, including Slime Across the UK and The Crunch.

In 2002, Petrie was a researcher for the BBC programme They Think It's All Over and, in 2005, was a comedy sketch writer for BBC Radio 1's The Milk Run.

He was a finalist in both So You Think You're Funny? and York's comedy festival National Talent Hunt in 2003. The following year, Petrie was a semi-finalist in the BBC's New Comedy Awards.

His acting work has included appearances in the Channel 4 comedy programmes Green Wing and Smack the Pony.

In 2012, he performed as one of the warm up acts on Greg Davies's Back of My Mum's Head tour.

Before joining CBBC's presentation team in September 2007, Petrie hosted the game show Wonderful World of Weird.

He later became the chief continuity presenter for the CBBC channel, presenting afternoon links for CBBC alongside Oucho T Cactus. The duo subsequently presented Ed and Oucho's Excellent Inventions and a weekend morning show entitled Transmission Impossible with Ed and Oucho.

In 2008, Petrie was nominated for a BAFTA in the Best Children's Presenter category, and collected the BAFTA for Best Children's Channel when it was won by CBBC.

A second series of Ed and Oucho's Excellent Inventions aired on the CBBC channel from 2 January 2010.

Petrie presented weekend links on the CBBC Channel with new CBBC presenter Chris Johnson from January 2010, whilst Oucho (Warrick Brownlow-Pike) was replaced by Dodge T Dog (Warrick Brownlow-Pike).

Petrie left CBBC presentation in June 2010 to present All Over the Place, a CBBC programme with Holly Walsh, which started airing in February 2011. As part of promotion for the series, Petrie returned to CBBC Continuity for a day. A second series of All Over the Place aired between January and March 2012.

In summer 2012, he presented a new CBBC series with Naomi Wilkinson, Marrying Mum and Dad, in which children plan their parents' weddings.

In November 2012, he starred in 12 Again with Dionne Bromfield, Adam Lambert and John Humphrys.

Petrie left the BBC in January 2024. His last appearance on CBBC was during Blue Peter on 17 March 2023. As of January 2024, Petrie is working as an organiser for the Labour Party in Putney and Wimbledon.

== Personal life ==
Petrie has said through Twitter that his girlfriend is French, and that she also appeared in a Comic Relief special starring Kate Moss. They have two children.

He supports Crystal Palace FC.

He confirmed on his Instagram Livestream on 22 April 2020 that he is married and has a wife.

== Filmography ==
=== Television ===
Year	Title	Role	Notes
2002	They Think It's All Over		Researcher
2002	Smack the Pony		Christmas Specials
2003	Can't Get In		MTV Trailers
2004	Later... with Jools Holland	Himself	Warm-up artist
2004–2006	The Crunch	Presenter	
2004–2007	Nickelodeon Kids' Choice Awards UK	Himself	Presenter
2005	Green Wing	Social Worker	Series 2, episode 4
2006–2007	ME:TV	Presenter	Nickelodeon UK
2007	Wonderful World of Weird	Presenter	Main host – with presenters Jake Humphrey, Lizzie Greenwood and Ortis Deley
2007	Slime Across the UK	Presenter	Nickelodeon UK – with presenter Sy Thomas
2007	SMart	Guest presenter	1 episode
2007–2010	CBBC Office	Presenter	
2007–2010	TMi	Special guest	
2008	Basil's Swap Shop	Special guest	
2008	SMart	Guest presenter	1 episode
2009–2010	Ed and Oucho's Excellent Inventions	Presenter/actor	
2009	Transmission Impossible with Ed and Oucho	Presenter	
2011–present	All Over The Place	Presenter	
2011-2016	Hacker Time	Guest/Various characters	Guest on Series 2, Episode 7
2011	Blue Peter	Special guest	
2012 – present	Marrying Mum and Dad	Presenter	Co-presenter with Naomi Wilkinson
2012	12 Again	Himself	Series 2, Episode 1
2015	Hacker's Birthday Bash: 30 Years of Children's BBC	Himself	One-off special
2016–present	The Dog Ate My Homework	Panelist	3 episodes
2016–present	All Over the Workplace	Narrator	20 episodes
2016	Naomi's Nightmares of Nature	Himself	2 episodes
2015,2018	Sam & Mark's Big Friday Wind-Up	Himself	1 episode
