= Martin Medina =

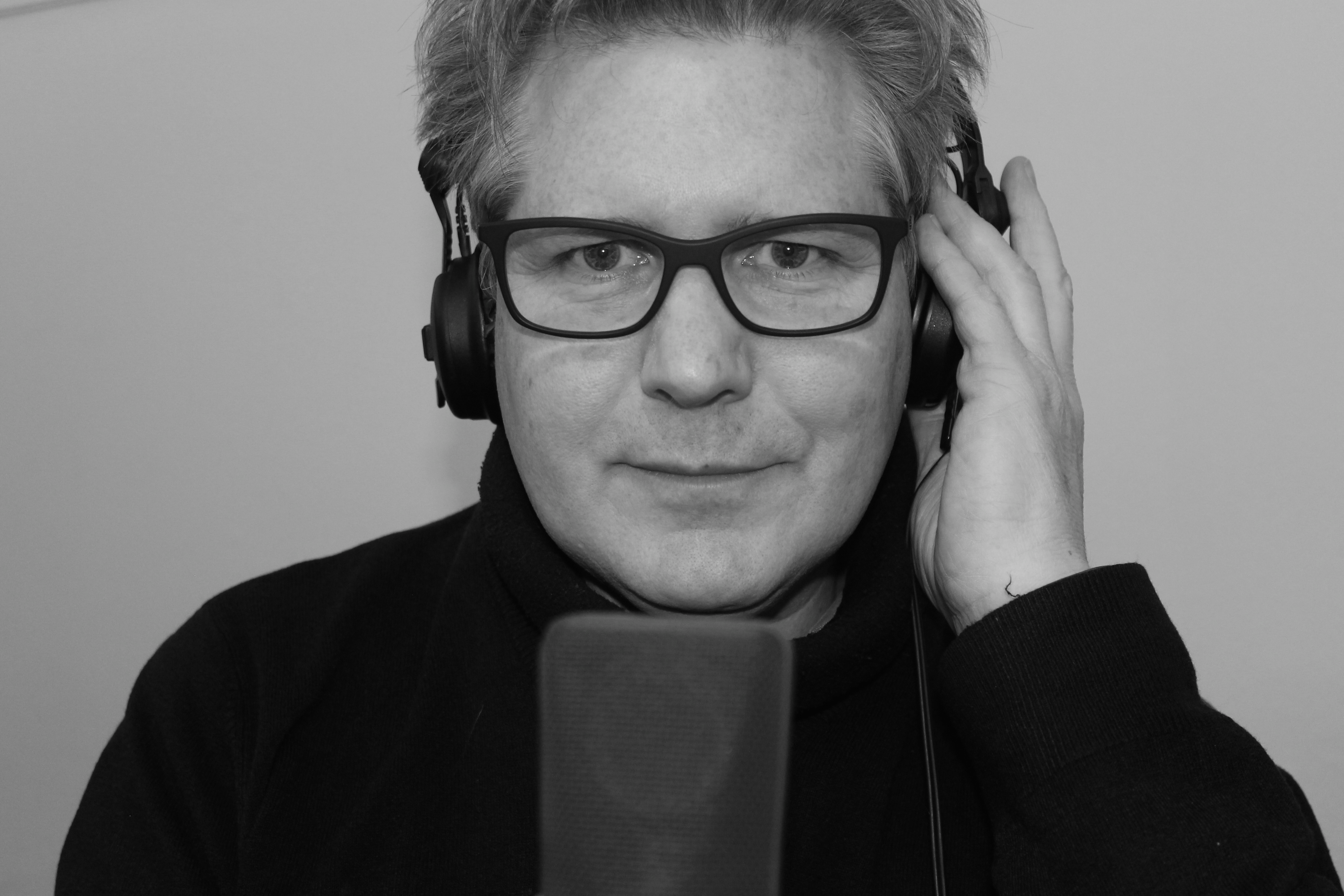

Background information
- Origin: England
- Occupation: Composer
- Instruments: Piano, guitar, trumpet, bass
- Website: www.martinmedina.co.uk

Martin Medina is an English composer best known for the BBC title themes Rip Off Britain, Scam Interceptors, Food: Truth or Scare, Wonderful World of Weird, Don't Log Off, The Untold, Short Change and Jo Brand's Christmas Log on Channel 4.

He plays piano and trumpet with The 99 Call and guitar and vocals in the folk duo Rose Price & Martin Medina.

He is the founder and director of the BBC Shorts Film Festival which is hosted by Francine Stock and supported by Alan Yentob.
