= Pablo the Little Red Fox =

Television series

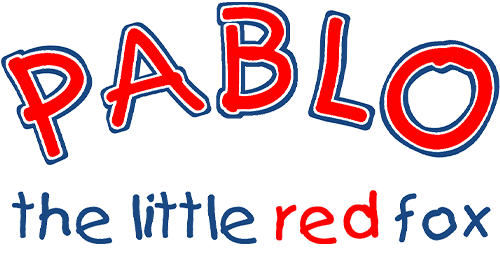
- Genre: Children's; Animated; Preschool; Educational; Slice of life Comedy
- Created by: Hannah Giffard
- Based on: Red Fox and Red Fox on the Move by Hannah Giffard
- Starring: David Holt; Louise Goldstein; Eve Karpf; Adrienne Posta; Bob Saker; Stuart Lock; Kate Harbour
- Opening theme: "Pablo the Little Red Fox" performed by the Clewborough House School children's choir
- Composer: Rowland Lee
- Countries of origin: United Kingdom; France
- Original languages: English; French
- No. of seasons: 1
- No. of episodes: 52

Production
- Executive producers: Theresa Plummer-Andrews; Roch Lener; Jonathan Peel
- Producers: Ken Anderson; Keith Tutt
- Running time: 4-5 minutes per episode (approx)
- Production companies: Red Fox Productions; Millimages

Original release
- Network: BBC One/BBC Two (CBBC) (United Kingdom); Disney Channel (France); La Cinquième (France)
- Release: 28 September – 17 November 1999

Pablo the Little Red Fox is a preschool children's animated cartoon series that originally ran from 28 September to 17 November 1999 on BBC One and BBC Two (part of CBBC). The series is a British-French co-production between Red Fox Productions and Millimages, and was produced in association with Disney Channel France, BBC, ZDF, ZDF Enterprises and Buena Vista Home Entertainment. (Note: Disney Channel France and BVHE are only credited on French prints of the series.) HIT Entertainment distributed the series globally outside of French-speaking territories.

The series centres on a little red city fox named Pablo, his siblings Poppy and Pumpkin, their parents, Red Fox and Rose, their friends, a dog named Baxter, a hedgehog named Helena, a cat named Finbar, a frog called Fromage, a seagull called Gil Gull and an owl named Madam Owl.

== Plot ==
The action often takes place at night, when three little fox cubs, Pablo, Poppy, and Pumpkin, go out and explore the city, from circus tents, artist's studios and the local museum. Pablo often leads them astray but somehow they always get out of trouble and find a way back home, to their cozy den at the bottom of Hannah's garden.

== Characters ==
The series centres on a little red city fox called Pablo (voiced by David Holt) and his siblings Pumpkin and Poppy, their parents, Red Fox and Rose, and their friends, a dog named Baxter, a hedgehog named Helena, a cat named Finbar, a frog called Fromage, a seagull called Gil Gull and an owl named Madam Owl.

== Production ==
=== Animation ===
The series' main characters. From left to right: Pumpkin, Poppy and Pablo

The animation style of the series has bright colours and white outlines, reminiscent of silk paintings and Hannah Giffard's original water colour illustrations. The series concept was created by Hannah Giffard, British writer and illustrator of the original books called 'Red Fox' and 'Red Fox on the Move' published by Frances Lincoln. Giffard worked closely on the series as an editor and creator of many of the story lines. She also worked with the art director and director to create the characters and backgrounds for the series.

=== Music ===
The theme music was composed by Rowland Lee, the lyrics were written by John Grace (who was a writer for the show), and was performed by the now-defunct Clewborough House School in Camberley.

== Episodes ==
=== Original episodes (1999-2000) ===
1. On the Top of the World
2. The Biggest Bed
3. Market Day
4. Gone Hunting
5. Pumpkin to the Rescue
6. Fishing for Dad
7. The Lost Bear
8. In the Balance
9. Footprint in the Snow
10. The Playground
11. Umbrella Day
12. At the Supermarket
13. Moving Out
14. A New Home for Helena
15. Bathtime
16. The Football Match
17. An Ice Day
18. Three Wishes
19. The Storm
20. Me and my Shadow
21. Sky High
22. Buried Treasure
23. Hide and Seek
24. The Train Journey
25. Pablo the Lifeguard
26. Fooled You!
27. Snowfox
28. Happy Twelve Moons
29. Sleepy Head
30. Pumpkin Measures Up
31. What's This?
32. How Does it Grow, Pablo?
33. Changing Rooms
34. City Lights
35. Pumpkin's Big Voice
36. The Sound of Music
37. Midnight Cleaning
38. Rattling Bones
39. Painter's Studio
40. The Balloon Trip
41. A Nest for Four
42. Smile!
43. Who's the Best?
44. Sticky Paws
45. The Growling Toy
46. The Post-office
47. Pablo and the Tin of Sardines
48. A Cub in a Tangle
49. The Kite
50. The Abominable Drain Monster
51. Abracadabra Pablo
52. The Last Apple

=== Double bill episodes (1999) ===
These double-bill episodes were originally aired on CBeebies in the United Kingdom from the channel's launch.

1. On the Top of the World/The Biggest Bed
2. Market Day/Gone Hunting
3. Pumpkin to the Rescue/Fishing for Dad
4. The Lost Bear/In the Balance
5. Footprint in the Snow/The Playground
6. Umbrella Day/At the Supermarket
7. Moving Out/A New Home for Helena
8. Bathtime/The Football Match
9. An Ice Day/Three Wishes
10. The Storm/Me and my Shadow
11. Sky High/Buried Treasure
12. Hide and Seek/The Train Journey
13. Pablo the Lifeguard/Fooled You!
14. Snowfox/Happy Twelve Moons
15. Sleepy Head/Pumpkin Measures Up
16. What's This?/How Does it Grow, Pablo?
17. Changing Rooms/City Lights
18. Pumpkin's Big Voice/The Sound of Music
19. Midnight Cleaning/Rattling Bones
20. Painter's Studio/The Balloon Trip
21. A Nest for Four/Smile!
22. Who's the Best?/Sticky Paws
23. The Growling Toy/The Post-office
24. Pablo and the Tin of Sardines/A Cub in a Tangle
25. The Kite/The Abominable Drain Monster
26. Abracadabra Pablo/The Last Apple

== Reception ==
=== Awards ===
The show won the British Academy Children's Award for International in 2000.

== See also ==
- Foxes in popular culture, films and literature
