= Toonatics =

British children's television series

Toonatics is a children's television program that was first broadcast on Children's BBC between the summers of 1997 and 1999. The show was created, directed and presented by Paul Burnham (as Thomas 'Tommy' Toon). The show broadcast cartoons, which included Tom and Jerry and Looney Tunes, and played games in between each cartoon.

== Plot ==
Every day Tommy Toon's mum went out to the shop and told her son "Thomas, Thomas, I'm going to the shop. So you'd better not start watching those crazy cartoons!" But regardless of his Mum's orders, Tommy doesn't care and invites four Toonatics to join him to find the greatest cartoon of all time, plus play a few mini-games in-between, before Tommy's mum comes back from the shop.

=== Series 2 changes ===
From Series 2 onwards Tommy toon is still present but he no longer acts like an immature kid.

== Episodes ==
- Series 1: 29 June – 28 September 1997: 14 episodes
- Series 2: 1 February – 29 March 1998: 7 episodes
- Series 3: 24 July – 4 September: 25 episodes

Last Episode on 2 January 1999
