= Take a Bow (TV series) =

- Genre: Talent
- Created by: Elen Rhys
- Country of origin: United Kingdom
- No. of episodes: 50

Production
- Running time: 5 minutes

Original release
- Network: CBeebies

Take a Bow is a British children's television series created by Elen Rhys, that was shown regularly on the CBeebies channel in the United Kingdom. The series features children performing in at a landmark in their area. The performances are shot in the style of a pop video. The performances vary from a singer on the London Eye, to organ playing in Blackpool Tower, from break dancing to playing in a jazz band.

Take a Bow originally began airing on 19 February 2007.

== Locations ==
- London Eye
- National Railway Museum
- Blackpool Tower
- Alton Towers

== Episodes ==
There are twenty five episodes in the first series and twenty five episodes in the second series.

=== Series 1 (19 February – 13 May 2007) ===
No.	Title	Original release date
1	"China in Liverpool"	19 February 2007
2	"Ollie's Dancing Feet"	26 February 2007
3	"Gigha! We are Here"	27 February 2007
4	"A Fishy Break in Plymouth"	28 February 2007
5	"By the Beach in Blackpool"	1 March 2007
6	"Bollywood Boogie"	2 March 2007
7	"Wheelchair Disco"	5 March 2007
8	"It Takes Two to Tango"	6 March 2007
9	"Children Rule the World"	13 March 2007
10	"Piping Hot in Edinburgh"	14 March 2007
11	"String Along"	16 March 2007
12	"Disco Divas in Anglesey"	19 March 2007
13	"Railway Rhythms"	20 March 2007
14	"Indian Leeds the Way"	21 March 2007
15	"Crystal Diamonds in Glasgow"	22 March 2007
16	"Ben Harps On"	23 March 2007
17	"Scunthorpe Singing Sensations"	8 April 2007
18	"Rockin' on the Rides"	9 April 2007
19	"Ukrainian Dancing"	10 April 2007
20	"A Drop of Golden Song"	20 April 2007
21	"Sheyenne on the London Eye"	21 April 2007
22	"Steel Pans in a Snowdome"	22 April 2007
23	"Curtis, King of the Castle"	23 April 2007
24	"Bubbling in Birmingham"	24 April 2007
25	"Drumming on the Bus"	13 May 2007

=== Series 2 (3 December 2007 - 17 January 2008) ===
No.	Title	Original release date
1	"Jamboree in the Park"	3 December 2007
2	"Roller Boogie at the Barrier"	4 December 2007
3	"Welcome to Jersey"	5 December 2007
4	"Tea for Two"	6 December 2007
5	"Farmhouse Rock"	7 December 2007
6	"All That Jazz"	10 December 2007
7	"Bolton Baton Twirlers"	11 December 2007
8	"Synch or Swim"	12 December 2007
9	"Centre Stage at Stonehenge"	13 December 2007
10	"Isle of Wright, Tap Delight"	14 December 2007
11	"Sing-a-long in Stormont"	21 December 2007
12	"Angel of the North"	31 December 2007
13	"James and the Giant's Causeway"	1 January 2008
14	"Drumming in the Woods"	2 January 2008
15	"Bodmin Boogie"	3 January 2008
16	"Fabulous Figureskating"	4 January 2008
17	"Street Feet on the Farm"	7 January 2008
18	"Yuanfan the Piano Man"	8 January 2008
19	"Maori Marina"	9 January 2008
20	"Anglesey Hits the High Notes"	10 January 2008
21	"Shetland Fiddling Frenzy"	11 January 2008
22	"Turkish at the Tate"	14 January 2008
23	"Ahoy There Harmonica"	15 January 2008
24	"Bright Line Moves to Brighton"	16 January 2008
25	"What a Circus"	17 January 2008
