= All Over the Workplace =

- Genre: Children's; Factual television
- Directed by: Drew Ferguson; Valerie Mellon; Steven Parsons; Kirstine Davidson
- Presented by: Alex Riley
- Narrated by: Ed Petrie
- Composer: Sanj Sen
- Country of origin: United Kingdom
- No. of series: 2
- No. of episodes: 20

Production
- Executive producer: Yvonne Jennings
- Producer: Dougie Napier
- Running time: 28 minutes
- Production company: CBBC Productions

Original release
- Network: CBBC
- Release: 7 March 2016 – 10 February 2017

All Over the Workplace is a British children's factual television series is a spin off of All Over the Place hosted by Alex Riley and narrated by Ed Petrie (who is the host of All Over the Place). The show is produced by CBBC Productions for CBBC and follows Riley taking two children (known as 'Rookies') to experience various jobs in the United Kingdom. Two series of 10 episodes each have been aired. Series 1 began on 7 March 2016, and series 2 began on 30 January 2017.

== Format ==
In each episode, Riley takes two children to experience jobs in the United Kingdom. These have included authors, chefs and fashion designers. Throughout the episode, they meet professionals who give them their top tips. At the end of the episode, the professionals say whether they think the child would do well in that job when they are older.

== Episodes ==
Series	Episodes	Originally released	
Series	Episodes	First released	Last released
1	10	7 March 2016	18 March 2016
2	10	30 January 2017	10 February 2017

=== Series 1 (2016) ===
No. overall	No. in season	Title	Directed by	Original release date
1	1	"Chefs"	Drew Ferguson	7 March 2016
Louis and Jess enter the high-pressure world of professional cooking.
2	2	"Authors"	Drew Ferguson	8 March 2016
Jack and Meg find out what it takes to make it as authors and work on creating their very own books.
3	3	"Doctors"	Valerie Mellon	9 March 2016
Aspiring young medics Rayaan and Lubna delve into the world of medicine and learn all about life as a GP.
4	4	"Space"	Valerie Mellon	10 March 2016
Honey and Leon get an out-of-this-world experience when they work with space scientists.
5	5	"Football"	Drew Ferguson	11 March 2016
Freya and Chitua visit a professional football club where they are put through their paces by the coaches.
6	6	"Comedy"	Drew Ferguson	14 March 2016
Brandon and Greta discover if they have what it takes to be stand-up comedians.
7	7	"Police"	Valerie Mellon	15 March 2016
Abi and Kyra see if they have what it takes to make it as an officer of the law.
8	8	"Games Design"	Valerie Mellon	16 March 2016
Budding games creators Kiya and Toby discover there is more than they thought to making computer games.
9	9	"Musical Theatre"	Drew Ferguson	17 March 2016
Harry and Mia visit the set of Chitty Chitty Bang Bang to learn what it takes to be theatre performers.
10	10	"Politics"	Valerie Mellon	18 March 2016
Charlotte and Henrietta are passionate about politics and they enter the corridors of power to meet MPs.

=== Series 2 (2017) ===
No. overall	No. in season	Title	Directed by	Original release date
11	1	"Fashion Designer"	Steven Parsons	30 January 2017
Dylan and Izzy have an eye for clothes and a burning desire to be fashion designers. Mentors: Claudine Rousseau, Giles Deacon and Adam Gibbs
12	2	"Marine Biologist"	Kirstine Davidson	31 January 2017
Ella and Struan are determined to become marine biologists, taking to the sea in Plymouth Sound. Mentors: Richard Thompson, Alan Deidun and Greg Nowell
13	3	"Pilot"	Steven Parsons	1 February 2017
Rookies Akshita and Sam take off into the world of aviation, taking to the skies in a small aircraft with mentor Tony, who puts them through their paces. Mentors: Andrew Neofytou, India Allix and Tony Partakis
14	4	"Teacher"	Steven Parsons	2 February 2017
Alex Riley and rookies Joseph and Ophelia find out exactly what it takes to make it in the world of teaching. Can they keep control of pupils with no outside help? Mentors: Greg Foot, Natalie White and Gillian Brodie
15	5	"Architect"	Steven Parsons	3 February 2017
Alex Riley and rookies Amjad and Rosie find out exactly what it takes to build a career as an architect. Mentors: Lord Norman Foster and Narinder Sagoo
16	6	"Farmer"	Kristine Davidson	6 February 2017
Rookies Megan and Holly experience what life is really like down on the farm, shepherding sheep into pens and ploughing furrows.
17	7	"Film-Maker"	Steven Parsons	7 February 2017
Harvey and Sam are two ambitious rookies who want to make it in the world of film-making, so they join presenter Alex Riley to explore the business. Mentors: Ashley Wild, Emma Lindley and the Casualty team
18	8	"Forensic Scientist"	Steven Parsons	8 February 2017
Rookies Edwin and Leila and presenter Alex Riley put on their protective outfits to probe the realm of crime investigation. Mentors: Dame Sue Black and Raymond Skibinski
19	9	"Illustrator"	Kirstine Davidson	9 February 2017
Rookies Tamira and Kirsty desperately want to become illustrators, so they join presenter Alex Riley in sketching out what it's like to be one. Mentors: Nadia Shireen, Michael Rosen and Ruth Jackson
20	10	"Cyclist"	Steven Parsons	10 February 2017
Presenter Alex Riley helps rookies Erin and Tom set their wheels spinning through a journey of cycling discovery as they attempt a stage of the Tour of Britain race. Mentors: Stuart Gray, Matthew Stephens and Liam Phillips
