= My Life is a Manga =

French animated television series

My Life is a Manga is an upcoming French animated series created by Nicolas Monteiro and produced by Brain Comet and Blue Spirit. Scheduled to have 52 episodes of 13 minutes each, the series will premiere in Europe in 2026.

== Plot ==
The series is about Liya, a fan of Japanese manga, who draws anime-style graphic novels in order to survive school, as well as other situations.

== Production ==
The European Broadcasting Union started the co-development financing initiative for the series in 2023, in a joint collaboration between France Télévision and CARTOON.

Monteiro based the series on his childhood experiences and dreams, the latter of which involved hypothetical scenarios that emerged from his family road trips. The global success of Japanese manga and anime motivated him to create a series using anime codes and adapted for the current audiovisual landscape. The series was presented in September 2024 in that year's edition of Cartoon Forum and will employ a mix of 2D and CG animation, using 2D animation rendered to 3D, developed by Blue Spirit.

On 2 April 2025, the European Broadcasting Union announced that eleven of its members (France TV (leader of the project), VRT, ARD/SWR, DR, RTVE, YLE, BBC, RTÉ, NRK, RTP and SVT) collectively funded €60,000 (US$64,900), enabling the series to be released by April 2026. The series is part of the EBU's Young Audiences Initiative, as part of its animation collaboration unit.

On 18 September 2025, Cartoon Forum attendees were treated to an updated look at the series, with Monteiro and his team unveiling its development.
