= Fully Booked =

- Also known as: FBi
- Genre: Children's
- Presented by: Zoe Ball (1995); Grant Stott (1995–97); Paul Brophy (1995–97); Sarah Vandenbergh (1996–97); Gail Porter (1998); Chris Jarvis (1998–99); Tim Vincent (1998–99); Kate Heavenor (1999–2000); Keith Duffy (2000); Vernon Kay (2000)
- Country of origin: United Kingdom
- Original language: English
- No. of series: 6
- No. of episodes: 133

Production
- Running time: 120–180 minutes
- Production company: BBC Scotland

Original release
- Network: BBC1 (1995, 2000); BBC2 (1996–99)
- Release: 22 April 1995 – 23 September 2000

Fully Booked, later retitled FBi, is a British children's television series produced by BBC Scotland and broadcast from 22 April 1995 to 23 September 2000.

== Format ==
=== Series 1–3 ===
The first series is presented by Zoe Ball and Grant Stott, and set in a fictional hotel. The presenters were joined by actor Paul Brophy, who appeared as a series of comic characters (such as 'Jan Van der Vall', 'Les Vegas' and 'Wee Alistair McAlistair'), and by a large puppet, a talking Highland cow named Morag who was the hotel's receptionist.

The second series had Ball being replaced by ex-Neighbours star Sarah Vandenbergh, due to the former's promotion to co-hosting Live & Kicking. Stott, along with Brophy's characters and Morag, all returned. This series was not broadcast live but was 'recorded as-live', meaning that it was recorded in one session with no editing and broadcast as if it were a continuous live show (though without any live interactivity). This format was also used for the third series.

Due to the death of Diana, Princess of Wales in the early hours of 31 August 1997, the edition of Fully Booked recorded for broadcast that morning was postponed, ultimately airing as part of the CBBC morning schedule on BBC Two on 2 September at 7:30am.

=== Series 4–5 ===
The fourth series had a new logo, title sequence and set introduced, along with a remix of the theme music. The presenters and characters of the show's previous incarnation were all removed, with a new presentation team consisting of Chris Jarvis, Gail Porter and Tim Vincent. The show continued to use the magazine format, with guests, games, features, inserts and music; however, the 'hotel' gimmick was largely dropped in favour of relatively straightforward magazine presentation.

The fifth series continued in this new format, but with Gail Porter having decided to quit kids' TV, Kate Heavenor was brought in to replace her. Heavenor had previously been presenting programmes for BBC Choice, and was one of the first presenters to graduate from a digital BBC channel to a show on one of the mainstream terrestrial channels.

The show gained a reputation for allowing alternative bands to perform alongside the mainstream pop acts, and booked groups including Electrasy, Shed Seven, Catatonia, The Dandys and St. Etienne to appear during this era.

=== Series 6 ===
The sixth and final series was replaced by a new live series. A new studio set, title music and graphics were introduced to tie in with the retitled name FBi.

The show was still hosted by Kate Heavenor, but Chris Jarvis and Tim Vincent were not involved, and were replaced by Vernon Kay (previously a presenter on digital channel UK Play) and former Boyzone member Keith Duffy.

The show had a similar mixed-magazine format to its predecessors, but aimed to increase the level of live interactivity by encouraging viewers to take part in the show via the internet, email, text messaging and telephone. Viewers were given the opportunity to take part in games and features and submit questions for studio guests.

== Transmissions ==
Series	Start date	End date	Episodes
1	22 April 1995	16 September 1995	22
2	21 April 1996	15 September 1996	22
3	27 April 1997	21 September 1997	22
4	26 April 1998	19 September 1998	22
5	25 April 1999	19 September 1999	22
6	22 April 2000	23 September 2000	23
