= Hard Spell Abbey =

British children's game show

- Genre: Game show
- Starring: Simon Hickson; Jaz Ampaw-Farr
- Narrated by: Simon Grant
- Theme music composer: Dobs Vye
- No. of episodes: 5

Original release
- Network: CBBC; BBC1
- Release: 29 November – 3 December 2004

Related
- Hard Spell

Hard Spell Abbey is a five-part spelling bee game show produced for CBBC. It was shot entirely on location in Suffolk during 2004. The series was designed to accompany Hard Spell, a family spelling competition for BBC One. Each episode featured games as well as some reality-based filming. Short comedy cameos from spelling celebrities were included in a popular strand named "Spellebrity Squares". In this rehash of a popular classic, celebrities (including Dermot O'Leary, Dick and Dom, Tracy Beaker, Jonathan Ross, and Dermot Murnaghan) were asked to spell live on camera.

In the show Simon Hickson played Brother Brendan, a slightly mad but likeable monk who lived at the abbey and wanted to be involved with every game. Jaz Ampaw-Farr, international education consultant and TEDx Speaker was the spelling expert who coached the contestants, aided by Brother Brendan to spelling success.
