= Rip–Off Britain (TV programme) =

British consumer rights television series

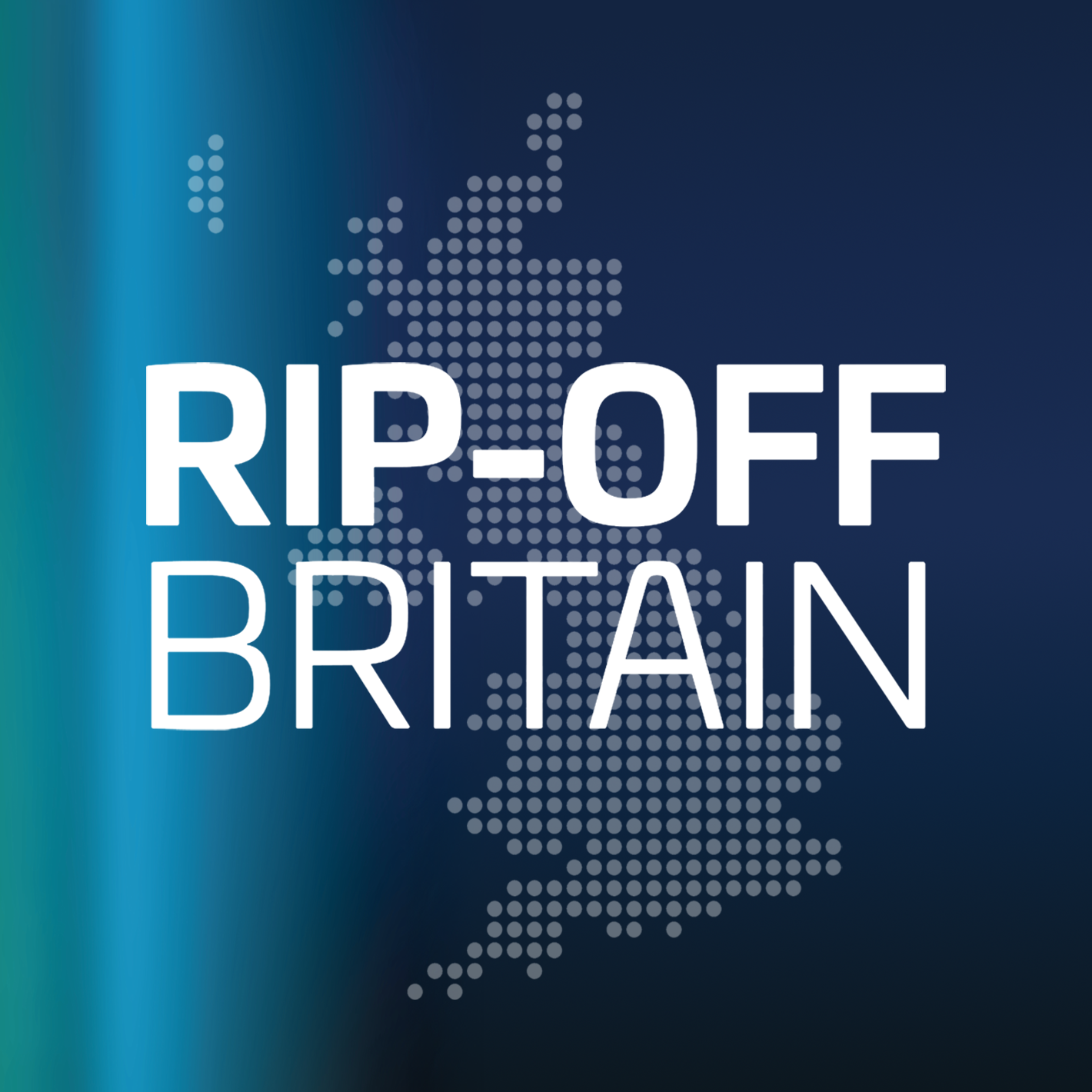
- Genre: Factual
- Presented by: Gloria Hunniford (2009–present); Julia Somerville (2011–present); Louise Minchin (2024–present); Angela Rippon (2009–2024); Jennie Bond (2009–2010)
- Theme music composer: Martin Medina
- Country of origin: United Kingdom
- Original language: English
- No. of series: 16 (Regular); 11 (Holidays); 10 (Live); 5 (Food)
- No. of episodes: 377 (Regular); 115 (Holidays); 95 (Live); 50 (Food)

Production
- Running time: 45 minutes
- Production company: BBC Studios Documentary Unit

Original release
- Network: BBC One
- Release: 30 November 2009 – present

Rip–Off Britain is a BBC One daytime series which exposes Britain's Rip-Offs and helps consumers. It began on 30 November 2009, presented by former news journalists Angela Rippon, Gloria Hunniford and Jennie Bond. Newsreader Julia Somerville replaced Bond from series three.

Rip-Off Britain has had three spin-off series: Rip-Off Britain: Food, Rip-Off Britain: Holidays and Rip-Off Britain: Live. The live shows were shown for one week, twice a year, but ended after ten live series due to budget constraints.

In 2024, Angela Rippon partnered with Smart Energy GB, alongside Ross Kemp, to launch a campaign promoting the installation of smart meters to consumers. The integrated adverts aired on television in the UK from November 2023 into 2025. Due to this, the BBC saw a conflict of interest, as Rip-Off Britain often holds energy companies and the Department for Energy Security and Net Zero to account on the roll out of smart meters. The promotion of such meters could impact the public's trust of the programme, and so it was mutually agreed that Angela Rippon would take leave from BBC productions for 12 months.

It was announced on 19 December 2024 that Louise Minchin would replace Angela Rippon for the third and final block of series 16, airing from 6 to 24 January 2025, and full-time from series 17, airing April 2025 onwards.

== Format ==
The Rip-Off Britain production team investigate and probe viewers' stories and complaints, exposing companies, organisations and individuals who are ripping-off consumers, and seek answers, remediation, refunds, compensation and other ways to leave customers and viewers satisfied.

Films are created, looking into cases and stories, often with multiple case studies of viewers who have experienced the same, or similar, situations. The team travels cross-country, from London, Brixham and Bournemouth in the south, to Manchester, Sunderland, Edinburgh and Aberdeen in the north, to hear from viewers and allow them to tell their stories in their own words.

The presenters then bring experts into the Rip-Off Britain HQ, delving more deeply into each story. They offer advice on how to go about the situation, how to avoid it, and what next steps customers could take. They may also bring in representatives from organisations, such as government departments, companies and charities, to offer explanations or their replies, as well as what steps may be taken in future to ensure certain situations do not happen to others.

Experts and guests who regularly appear on the show include Simon Calder, David McClelland, Kate Hardcastle, Sylvia Rook, Helen Dewdney, Adam French, Gary Rycroft, Sarah Pennels, Paul Lewis and Martyn James.

== Transmissions ==
=== Regular ===
Series	Start date	End date	Episodes	Notes
1	30 November 2009	4 December 2009	5	Daytime
2	22 November 2010	17 December 2010	20	Daytime
2	5 January 2011	8 April 2011	11	Primetime
3	28 November 2011	23 December 2011	20	Daytime
3	18 January 2012	30 May 2012	8	Primetime
4	3 September 2012	28 September 2012	20	Daytime
4	7 January 2013	5 August 2013	8	Primetime
5	2 September 2013	27 September 2013	20	Daytime
6	15 September 2014	10 October 2014	20	Daytime
7	14 September 2015	9 October 2015	20	Daytime
8	12 September 2016	7 October 2016	20	Daytime
9	1 May 2017	13 October 2017	20	Daytime
10	11 June 2018	12 October 2018	20	Daytime
11	6 May 2019	11 October 2019	20	Daytime
12	6 July 2020	16 October 2020	20	Daytime
13	3 May 2021	15 October 2021	20	Daytime
14	2 May 2022	14 October 2022	20	Daytime
15	15 May 2023	22 January 2024	40	Daytime
16	20 May 2024	24 January 2025	45	Daytime
17	14 April 2025	2 May 2025	15	Daytime

=== Holidays ===
Series	Start date	End date	Episodes
1	7 January 2013	11 January 2013	5
2	6 January 2014	10 January 2014	5
3	5 January 2015	16 January 2015	10
4	4 January 2016	15 January 2016	10
5	2 January 2017	20 January 2017	15
6	2 January 2018	22 January 2018	15
7	7 January 2019	25 January 2019	15
8	6 January 2020	17 January 2020	10
9	4 January 2021	15 January 2021	10
10	17 January 2022	28 January 2022	10
11	2 January 2023	13 January 2023	10

=== Food ===
Series	Start date	End date	Episodes
1	17 March 2014	28 March 2014	10
2	13 April 2015	24 April 2015	10
3	25 April 2016	6 May 2016	10
4	29 May 2017	9 June 2017	10
5	23 April 2018	4 May 2018	10

=== Live ===
Series	Start date	End date	Episodes
1	20 October 2014	24 October 2014	5
2	19 October 2015	23 October 2015	5
3	10 October 2016	14 October 2016	5
4	15 May 2017	20 October 2017	10
5	25 June 2018	19 October 2018	10
6	20 May 2019	18 October 2019	10
7	20 January 2020	23 October 2020	10
8	18 January 2021	22 October 2021	15
9	31 January 2022	21 October 2022	15
10	16 January 2023	20 October 2023	10

== Competitive tender ==
On 16 January 2025, the BBC announced that it had put the series' tender up for auction as part of its "competitive tender" policy, allowing independent companies to bid on producing the programme. The format of the programme remains the same within the tender, producing three blocks of 15 episodes, totalling 45 episodes per year, for a total of two years. Each episode is 45 minutes long.
