= Stitch Up! =

British hidden camera television show

Stitch Up! is a surreal CBBC children's hidden camera show in which pranks are played on the general public. It was originally broadcast in early 2002 and was repeated until 2008 on the CBBC channel, when CBBC began to focus even more on their target audience of the under 12s. Pranks were played all over the UK, with most taking place in London and the South East, although specials were filmed abroad.

In contrast to other CBBC programmes, Stitch Up! was more aimed at older children and teenagers (most CBBC programmes are aimed at primary school age children). The presenters and victims were all teenagers and adults with comparatively little child participation. The soundtrack/background music was often sultry and urbane, featuring bands like Oasis and Royksopp.

Notable pranks included Anne Foy pretending to be a news reader, appearing on TV screens in an electrical store, revealing embarrassing stories about a victim, who was watching the screens in horror whilst shopping with his family. Another surreal, ongoing sketch involved actors in knights' costumes and other strange outfits, fighting and doing bizarre things in a busy street, to the confusion of shoppers. Calum Callaghan played a boy who invited people to play card games with him in a train station and always accused them of cheating. Marvin Benoit played street magician 'David Plain' - a spoof of the famous magician David Blaine. Simon Kane played Remote Controlled Kid in all three series. He would enter a shop and ask a member of staff confusing and totally random questions.

The final prank of each show was the Big Stitch Up! One popular prank involved tricking a boy into believing his bedroom would be transformed by a DIY TV show whilst he was at school. When he returned home, it was revealed that his bedroom had actually been made to look like a garden, complete with a gnome and water feature. Another involved giving a Saturday worker at a hairdresser a 'day from hell' at work, with customers' hair catching fire and mirrors smashing in front of her. When it was revealed to the victim that it had all been a prank, he or she would receive a Stitch Up! trophy.

Stitch Up! ran for three series. Two of these were in 2002 and the third was in 2004. There is a Halloween special (also produced in 2004), titled Spook Up!, and is usually repeated around the Halloween time of year. A one off episode entitled 'Celebrity Stitch Up!' was produced.

The show originally starred Marvin Benoit, Calum Callaghan, Anne Foy and Simon Kane, but new presenters, Adam Selkirk-Brown and Sita Thomas, later joined for the 2004 series.
