= Eureka TV =

British children's television series

- Genre: Children's, science
- Starring: Kate Heavenor; Fearne Cotton (series 1-2); Mohini Sule (series 3)
- Country of origin: United Kingdom
- No. of series: 3

Production
- Running time: 15 minutes

Original release
- Network: CBBC
- Release: 2001 – 2005

Eureka TV is a British children's television series about science that ran from 2001 to 2005 on the children's TV channel CBBC.

== Presenters ==
- Fearne Cotton (series 1–2) 2001-2003
- Kate Heavenor (series 1–3) 2001-2005
- Mohini Sule (series 3) 2004-2005

== Features ==
High Tech Eureka

- The latest technology.

Micro Eureka

- Showed an everyday object, magnified hundreds of times.

Little Eureka

- A science experiment using everyday objects.

Wild Eureka

- About animals.

Big Eureka

- Mysteries from the world of science.

Paper Eureka

- Things to do with an A4 sheet of paper.

== Eureka Mondays ==
Presenters

- Mohini Sule – main morning presenter
- Sophie McDonell – helper morning presenter/morning continuity presenter
- Kate Heavenor – main afternoon presenter
- Angellica Bell – afternoon continuity presenter
- Andrew Hayden-Smith – helper afternoon presenter/afternoon continuity
- Holly Willoughby – relief presenter for all areas

== Series ==
=== Series 1 (2001-2002) ===
The first series aired on 24 September 2001 and ended on 17 December 2001. The series was presented by Kate Heavenor and Fearne Cotton. This series had all of the features above except for Paper and Micro Eureka.

=== Series 2 (2003) ===
The series was the second which aired midway through 2003, it was put off an extra few months than intended because of the new science show X-perimental which was presented by Ortis Deley and Holly Willoughby. In the series there was the addition of Paper and Micro Eureka.

=== Series 3 (2004-2005) ===
This was the final series, which was presented by Mohini Sule and Kate Heavoner. Eureka Mondays was added, on BBC One and BBC Two, presented by Monhini Sule and Sophie McDonnell in the morning and Kate Heavoner along with Angellica Bell and Andrew Hayden Smith in the afternoons. All the same features remained in this series as in the series before.
