= Mop and Smiff =

- Genre: animation/Children's
- Created by: Mike Amatt
- Written by: Mike Amatt
- Directed by: Sid Waddell
- Voices of: Timothy West (Mop), Prunella Scales (Smiff)
- Theme music composer: Mike Amatt
- Opening theme: "Two of a kind"
- Country of origin: United Kingdom
- No. of series: 1
- No. of episodes: 13

Production
- Producer: David Brown
- Running time: 15 minutes (Series)
- Production company: BBC Manchester

Original release
- Network: BBC1
- Release: 1985 – 1986

Mop and Smiff is a children's pre-school television programme, the first episode "The Hang Glider" was broadcast on 4 April 1985 on BBC1, the final episode "The Snow" aired on 1 January 1986. Repeats of the programme were shown on BBC2 until 1988. The show creator Mike Amatt also stars as himself with his dog Mop and cat Smiff.

== Characters ==
Mop is a shaggy-haired sheepdog.

Smiff is a bright-eyed tabby cat.

Mike, their owner, is an artist and storyteller.

== Setting ==
The show used a portmanteau format with a small cartoon show embedded inside a narrative. The show starts with detailing a day of Mike, Mop or Smiff in real camera recording format. When they return home later, Mike would use the day's events for artistic inspiration to draw a cartoon. The show cuts into Mike's imagined animated sub-story with Mop and Smiff as talking friends who care for each other and go on their own adventure.

== Mike, Mop and the Moke ==
A spin-off series, Mike, Mop and the Moke, was produced in 1985, and featured Amatt and Mop driving to various seaside towns in an Austin Champ.

== Episodes ==
1. The Hang Glider (4 April 1985): Mop wishes a friend would drop in and Smiff goes chasing butterflies.
2. The Seaside (18 April 1985): Mop takes a boat trip and Smiff wishes he had kittens.
3. The Special Day (2 May 1985): Mop watches a wedding and Smiff dreams up a surprise.
4. The Camp (9 May 1985): Mop plays hide and seek and Smiff learns to be a guide.
5. The Carnival (16 May 1985)
6. The Treasure (23 May 1985): Mop turns detective and leads Smiff on a false scent.
