= Rule the School =

British reality TV show

Rule the School is a modern role-reversal, reality TV show for teenagers formerly shown on CBBC. The basis of the show was to take five talented school pupils and 10 school teachers and swap roles. The pupils became the teachers and the teachers became the pupils. The series first aired in 2002, with lessons including text-messaging, break-dancing, computer gaming, customising clothes, popstar skills and 'funky footballing'. The series was nominated for a BAFTA in 2003 when lessons included dance, rap and, slightly more conventionally, physical education. In 2004 the timetable included dance lessons, DJing, skateboarding and fashion.

The show ended in 2005 after four seasons, and was presented by Jake Humphrey.

== The "Teachers" ==
The five Rule the School "teachers" represented a cross-section of society. The young teaching team consisted of young adults around the 12–14 age range picked from a diverse selection of schools and groups across the UK. Each young person selected to take part in the project had an area of speciality they were confident and able to teach adults about. They had their own policies on punishments, budgets, lesson plans and even dress code.

== The "Pupils" ==
The ten Rule the School "pupils" were an equally colourful and diverse bunch. They were a mixture of teachers, different personalities, age groups and subject backgrounds. They were required to abide by the rules their new-found teachers made or face the consequences!

== Production ==
- Executive Producer – Uzma Mir-Young
- Produced by – Helen Docherty
- Assistant Producer – Rachel Bazely
- Directed by – Jaqui McAlpine

== Future success ==
Adam, dance teacher from Season 3, became a member of the CBBC STITCH UP gang. Jess Pearson, the dance teacher in Season 4 later went on to star in BBC Three comedy-drama Drop Dead Gorgeous. Jordan McCuaig, who taught DJing in a later year then went on to national success at renowned nightclubs and festivals, including live sets on Radio One and BBC Documentaries.
