= Captain Abercromby =

- Created by: John Gorman
- Starring: (puppeteers) Colin Purves, Geoff Felix, Dave Chapman, Damian Farrell, Symon Macintyre, Lynn Robertson-Bruce, Leslie Carrara-Rudolph (voices) Kate Heavenor, Mark McDonnell, Jo James, Barbara Rafferty, Lewis MacLeod, Ian Sexon
- Country of origin: United Kingdom
- No. of episodes: 26

Production
- Running time: 15 minutes

Original release
- Network: BBC
- Release: 4 January 2002 – 26 February 2003

Captain Abercromby is a children's TV show that was on BBC Two in 2002–2003. Its cast are puppets.

== Series overview ==
Captain Abercromby was a puppet series about a boy named Abercromby, who is raised by his grandfather. After hearing the tale of how his Grandpa lost his watch, which was given to him by Abercromby's mother, he dreams that he is a captain of a seaship, the "Hope", and that he is on a mission to find the watch. They have a rival crew attempting to find buried treasure, run by Captain Jake in his ship "Thunderbottom", who mistakenly (but logically) believe that Abercromby is looking for buried treasure, so making the series a race between the two ships.

Each show would open with Abercromby's Grandpa telling his story, in a green wooden bedroom surrounded by characters and props which later fill out the cast of Abercromby's dreams – a suit of armour in the corner (Arthur), a carved mermaid (Siren) and the tree outside (Great Oak). The following shots showed Abercromby climbing into bed (with Poindexter on the end) and going to sleep, saying "I'll find that watch one day", entering the dream world of the show and starting the title sequence.

Each story would finish with an alarm clock ringing, bringing Abercromby out of his dream and waking up to his Grandpa standing by his bed. Abercromby then begins to tell his Grandpa an excited summary of the episode, volume fading down as the credits and music roll over the scene.

== Characters ==
=== Abercromby's crew ===
- Abercromby – the show's titular character, Abercromby is a boy who dreams of an adventure where he is trying to find his Grandpa's missing watch.
- Siren – Abercromby's shipmate, and the living figurehead of the ship. She believes in Abercromby the most, and is the one who will convince the others to save him.
- Great Oak – a talking tree, an Oak Tree in particular, he is the ship's helmsman, and responsible for keeping the ship moving. He is also the fount of knowledge and wisdom on board the ship.
- Arthur – a talking suit of armour that works on the ship. Arthur is a bumbling character, and is the prominent character in the series, next to Abercromby himself.
- Poindexter – the ship's janitor, who is also a purple talking dog. Poindexter is quite intelligent, as he is shown doing things humans are subject to do. Aside from Captain Abercromby, he is the only character to cross from the "real" world into the "dream" world.

=== Thunderbottom Crew ===
- Captain Jake – a pirate, and arch rival to Abercromby. Although Jake is a fully grown man, he often resorts to very childish behaviour. Jake looks like a very typical pirate, but much of his appearance is put on – his eyepatch just covers a perfectly good eye, and his hook is held in one of his hands. Jake's schemes to catch up with Abercromby usually involve a comedic comeupance.
- Bobweb – a spider, she sits on Jake's shoulder much as a parrot would on a stereotypical pirate. She is the scheming half of the partnership, more intelligent than Jake, but just as likely to get her just deserts.
- Russian Dolls – the Thunderbottom is also home to three black and white "pirate-themed" Russian dolls, varying in size from one bigger than all the other characters on board to a small "Baby skull" doll.
- Seagulls – most of the crew of Thunderbottom is Seagulls who often speak or are randomly assigned a name.
- Clawdia – ship's cat, and most often behind the wheel of the Thunderbottom.
- Snappy – the chef. A red lobster, he was voiced in a pastiche of Woody Allen's mannerisms.

=== Other characters ===
- Sultan – the ruler of "Rabadabdab", a seaside exotic port which was the most frequent mooring for the "Hope". Like most of "Rabadabdab"'s inhabitants, he was a bird, a purple puffin.
- Lily Limpet – East-end mollusc who serves food and drink at the Limpet Inn, Rabadabdab's drinking hole (soft drinks only!)
- Admiral Dobbin – authority figure, head of the "King's Navy". Admiral Dobbin would often enter the story to sort out a mess.
- Grandpa – Abercromby's grandfather and guardian whose watch Abercromby dreams of finding.

== Episode titles and plots ==
- Birthday Bash
- Sailor of the Year: Siren is nominated for the annual Sailor of the Year competition.
- Captain's Cook: Jake threatens Snappy.
- The Duel
- Extra Pair of Paws: Is the new ship's cat Molly spying for Jake?
- Unlucky For Some
- The Right Treatment
- The Rule Book
- The Sultan's Visit
- Mrs Jake
- Arthur's Family Tree: The skipper and his crew visit Arthur's ancestral home.
- Trumpet Boy
- Out of the Hat
- Watch Out
- Navy Blues
- Lights Out
- Stowaway Star: The ship is inspected.
- What A Washout: Great Oak is suffering from sunstroke so Abercromby and Siren must find some freshwater.
- Gee A Genie
- The Sultan's Challenge
- Big Blue Fish
- Mummy's Little Treasure
- Bobweb's Machine
- Bully For You
- Captain Invisible
- Marooned

In one episode of the series, "Out of the Hat", Abercromby and his crew briefly find his Grandpa's watch, seen every week in the opening title sequence. However, this copy of the watch is dismissed by Admiral Dobbin as being a fake.

== Production ==
The show was produced by Wark Clements for BBC Scotland. Filming took place from February to July 2001 in Glasgow. The series was being filmed at the Media Park in Maryhill, Glasgow but on 22 April a fire took hold of the studio, destroying all sets, props and equipment. The production relocated to another nearby studio to complete the filming, after rebuilding as much as they needed to finish filming. The music for the show was composed by Rowland Lee.

== Style ==
The puppets and design of the show were all created in a child-friendly cartoon style, with the majority of the creatures being Muppet-type puppets (although they were built by Neil Sterenberg's studio, not Jim Henson's). The puppet of Abercromby was recycled and later used as Howie for the Canadian preschool TV series Now You Know produced by Little Engine Moving Pictures in 2014.

== Crew ==
creator/designer:	John Gorman
director:	Doug Williams
producers:	Doug Williams, Ken Anderson, Dominique Middleton
writer:	Keith Brumpton, Doug Williams
script editor:	Mike James
music:	Rowland Lee
lyrics:	Rowland Lee, Keith Brumpton
puppeteers:	Colin Purves, Dave Chapman, Symon Macintyre, Damian Farrell, Leslie Carrara-Rudolph, Lynn Robertson Bruce, Geoff Felix
additional puppeteers:	Neil Sterenberg, Victoria Willing
puppet workshop:	Grant Mason, Sarah Cowlinshaw
with thanks to:	Scottish Mask & Puppet Centre
puppet construction:	Daedalus Models, Neil Sterenberg
set design:	The Quickening, WM Design
construction manager:	Neil Querns
asst art dir:	Dave Turbitt
art director:	Ewen Duncan
accountant:	Scott Harper
lighting camera:	Gary Morrison
camera asst:	Keith Ingram, Shu Lorimer
lighting:	Steve Arthur, Chris Batchelor
grip:	Lucien Grieve
sound sup:	Steve Thom
editor:	Donna Blackney
computer graphics:	Pictures on the Wall
asst dub mix:	Dave Soutar
dubbing mixer:	Mike Powell
voices:	Kate Heavenor (mainly Captain Abercromby)
	Mark McDonnell (Great Oak and others)
	Jo James (Siren and others)
	Barbara Rafferty (Bobweb and others)
	Lewis MacLeod (Arthur and others)
	Ian Sexon (Captain Jake and others)
