= Sub Zero (game show) =

British children's game show

Sub Zero is an interactive children's game show based around the show The Crystal Maze. The show featured on CBBC on BBC Two from 21 February 1999 to 11 March 2001. The show had teams of both girls (XX) and boys (XY) doing challenges and, like The Crystal Maze children's episodes, contained tasks for children of the pre-teen age group. It was pitched as the "Ultimate Battle of the Sexes".

The programme was named by a CBBC website user, 12-year-old Edward Stevenson.

Several former contestants have ended up working in the media themselves, including TV presenter Lauren Jamison and Cambridge-based radio presenter, Matt Webb.

== Presenters ==
- Jemma James
- Robin Banks
- Adrian Dickson (XY Team Captain from Series 3)
- Rani Price (XX Team Captain from Series 3)
