= Whizz Whizz Bang Bang =

- Whizz Whizz Bang Bang Title Card
- Genre: Children's; Science; Engineering
- Created by: Luke Nola
- Directed by: Paul Hineman; Peter MacQueen; Hannah Mattison
- Presented by: Greg Foot
- Composer: Dobs Vye
- Country of origin: United Kingdom
- Original language: English
- No. of series: 1
- No. of episodes: 15

Production
- Executive producer: Sue Morgan
- Producers: Simon Parsons, Brendan McCaul
- Editors: Jonathan Seal; Robin Stokes
- Running time: 28 minutes

Original release
- Network: BBC One
- Release: 5 March – 31 March 2007

Whizz Whizz Bang Bang is a BAFTA Scotland nominated Best Children's Programme on BBC television series that began airing the fifth of March, 2007. A licensed television format based on the New Zealand series Let's Get Inventin'. Presented by Greg Foot. It features a different child in each programme who has an invention idea and then the team, with the help of Ralph, tries to build it. Most attempts have been successful, although all ideas have had to be slightly changed to make them practical. Inventions have included a hover scooter, a hydraulic off-road wheel chair, basketball launcher, jet engine bed and an Air Guitar.
