= Dizzy Heights (TV series) =

- Genre: Children's television
- Directed by: Claire Winyard
- Starring: Alan Heap; Mick Wall
- Country of origin: United Kingdom
- Original language: English
- No. of seasons: 4
- No. of episodes: 27

Production
- Producers: Martin Fisher; Martin Hughes

Original release
- Network: BBC
- Release: 15 February 1990 – 1 April 1993

Dizzy Heights is a BBC television series about a disastrous partnership of two managers trying to run a seaside hotel. The show was about Mr Heap (played by Alan Heap) and Mr Wall's (played by Mick Wall) many adventures and regularly featured a Spitting Image style family of puppets called the Gristles who lived, and caused chaos, in the hotel. The show ran for three years, from 1990 to 1993 and was shown on BBC1 as part of Children's BBC.

The Gristle family appeared in a series of their own called The House of Gristle in 1994.

== Characters ==
- Mr Heap (played by Alan Heap)
- Mr Wall (played by Mick Wall)
- Rebecca Front
- Madam Visniskaye (played by Kate Robbins)
- Ivy (played by Hilary Mason)
- Rose (played by Aimée Delamain)
