= The House of Gristle =

- Genre: Children's television
- Directed by: Martin Hughes
- Starring: The Gristle Family from Dizzy Heights
- Voices of: Steve Nallon as Vera Gristle; Richard Robinson as Vic Gristle; William Todd-Jones as Eustace Gristle
- Theme music composer: Terry Day
- Country of origin: United Kingdom
- Original language: English
- No. of seasons: 1
- No. of episodes: 9

Production
- Executive producer: Christopher Pilkington
- Producer: Martin Hughes
- Running time: 30 minutes

Original release
- Network: BBC One
- Release: 7 April – 2 June 1994

The House of Gristle is a British children's comedy sketch series for Children's BBC which ran for nine weeks from 7 April 1994 until 2 June 1994. This was the Gristle family that had previously appeared in Dizzy Heights. This was mainly down to Steve Nallon's puppetry and voice talents.

The main concept behind the show was that an ordinary family, the Gristles, had been given their own television series and so they produced a sort of amateur "Family Television Channel", creating their own special versions of television programmes of the day. The series had parodies, sketches and its own serial.

The serial, a comic gothic horror send up called The Curious Case of Dr Van Rental, was later broadcast as a whole on New Year's Eve 1995 as a one-off special. In the series Steve Nallon played Vera Gristle, the mum of the family, who spent most of her time eating.

The series was produced and directed by Martin Hughes, and it was filmed in-front of live studio audience.

Unlike its predecessor, "Dizzy Heights," The House of Gristle never shown in re-runs or neither had its 2nd series commissioned.
