= Ed and Oucho's Excellent Inventions =

- Ed and Oucho's Excellent Inventions title card
- Genre: Children's; Factual
- Starring: Ed Petrie; Warrick Brownlow-Pike
- Composers: Richie Webb; Matt Katz
- Country of origin: United Kingdom
- No. of series: 2
- No. of episodes: 26

Production
- Producers: Sue Morgan and Simon Parsons; Louise Corbett
- Production location: BBC Scotland
- Camera setup: Multiple
- Running time: 30min

Original release
- Network: CBBC (UK); BBC Kids (Canada)
- Release: 5 January 2009 – 27 March 2010

Ed and Oucho's Excellent Inventions is a children's TV show, presented by Ed Petrie and his puppet cactus companion, Oucho (performed by Warrick Brownlow-Pike). Before this programme, Ed and Oucho were CBBC office presenters and favoured by many children.

The premise of the show was children sending in designs of inventions, with one each episode being created.

The inventions in the show were created by Artem Ltd, a company that creates props and special effects for TV and film productions.

For the second series, it aired from 2 January 2010 on BBC 2.

== Description ==
Produced by Sue Morgan and Simon Parsons who also produced Whizz Whizz Bang Bang at BBC Scotland. This is a licensed television format based on the New Zealand series Let's Get Inventin'. Presented by Greg Foot. It features a different child in each programme who has an invention idea and then the team, with the help of Ralph, tries to build it. Most attempts have been successful, although all ideas have had to be slightly changed to make them practical. Inventions have included a hover scooter, a hydraulic off-road wheel chair, basketball launcher, jet engine bed and an Air Guitar.

== Episodes ==
| Series | Episodes | Originally released | |
| Series | Episodes | First released | Last released |
|---|---|---|---|
| 1 | 13 | 5 January 2009 | 30 March 2009 |
| 2 | 13 | 2 January 2010 | 27 March 2010 |

=== Series 1 (2009) ===
Filming for this series began in September 2008 and ended in December 2008.

| No. overall | No. in series | Title | Directed by | Written by | Original release date |
|---|---|---|---|---|---|
| 1 | 1 | "The Falconator" | Unknown | Unknown | 5 January 2009 |
Ed and Oucho try to build the Falconator, an all-terrain vehicle with a juicer and custard cannon. It starts off well, until Oucho crashes it.
| 2 | 2 | "The Icecoolator" | Unknown | Unknown | 12 January 2009 |
Ed and Oucho try to build the Icecoolator, an ice-cream-making bicycle. It starts off well, but the ice cream won't freeze.
| 3 | 3 | "Aqua Drifters" | Unknown | Unknown | 19 January 2009 |
Ed and Oucho try to build Aqua Drifters, shoes that walk on water. It starts off well, until Oucho's ping pong shoes sink without trace.
| 4 | 4 | "Fizzerrari" | Unknown | Unknown | 26 January 2009 |
Ed and Oucho try to build the Fizzerrari, a car powered only by lemonade. It starts off well, until Oucho crashes the prototype.
| 5 | 5 | "Sir Save-a-Lot" | Unknown | Unknown | 2 February 2009 |
Ed and Oucho try to build Sir Save-a-Lot, a karaoke robot goalie. It starts off well, until Oucho realises he knows nothing about robots.
| 6 | 6 | "Mermaid Tail" | Unknown | Unknown | 9 February 2009 |
Intrepid inventors Ed and Oucho try to build the Mermaider, a mermaid tail for humans. It starts off well – until Ed realises that the tail doesn't work at all.
| 7 | 7 | "Dirt Rumbler" | Unknown | Unknown | 16 February 2009 |
Ed and Oucho try to build the Dirt Rumbler, a tank that waterbombs people. It starts off well, until Oucho realises the catapult does not work.
| 8 | 8 | "Gardening Dragon" | Unknown | Unknown | 23 February 2009 |
Ed and Oucho try to build the Dolly the Gardening Dragon, a dragon that can dig, water, plant seeds and has a hot chocolate tummy.
| 9 | 9 | "Solar Jak-et" | Unknown | Unknown | 2 March 2009 |
Ed and Oucho try to build the Solar Jak-et, a jacket that lights up, plays music, sprays water and has a walkie talkie.
| 10 | 10 | "Treat Run" | Unknown | Unknown | 9 March 2009 |
Ed and Oucho try to build the Treat Run, a treadmill that powers music, a water spray, a chocolate drawer and a confetti bomb.
| 11 | 11 | "Amazopack" | Unknown | Unknown | 16 March 2009 |
Ed and Oucho try to build the 'Amazopak', a backpack that hides stuff, controls a car and has a TV on it. Will they be able to build it in time?
| 12 | 12 | "Flying Pizzaling" | Unknown | Unknown | 23 March 2009 |
Ed and Oucho try to make the Flying Pizzaling, a flying pizza deliverer. Their cheese lifting experiment soon descends into a food fight.
| 13 | 13 | "The Waker Upper" | Unknown | Unknown | 30 March 2009 |
Ed and Oucho try to make the 'Waker Upper', a contraption that wakes you up by opening curtains, turning on music and providing biscuits.

=== Series 2 (2010) ===
Filming for the second series began in August 2009.

| No. overall | No. in series | Title | Directed by | Written by | Original release date |
|---|---|---|---|---|---|
| 14 | 1 | "Bubble Bobbin Robin" | Claire Gillies | Unknown | 2 January 2010 |
Ed and Oucho try to make a robin-shaped hovercraft, but will investigative journalist Seymour Scandal expose them as science fakes?
| 15 | 2 | "High Hydra" | Claire Gillies | Unknown | 9 January 2010 |
Ed and Oucho's campervan has become infested with cake-eating mice. The only solution is to make Joe's High Hydra.
| 16 | 3 | "Choccy Oke" | Natalie Moss | Unknown | 16 January 2010 |
Ed and Oucho must invent a stall to make chocolate-covered marshmallows for Chloe, but zombies threaten to eat Oucho if it's not built on time.
| 17 | 4 | "Popper Chopper" | Jennifer King | Unknown | 23 January 2010 |
Ed and Oucho are in Bishop's Stortford trying to build Harvey's Popper Chopper, a car that makes butterscotch popcorn.
| 18 | 5 | "Rainbow a Go Go" | Jennifer King | Unknown | 30 January 2010 |
When Ed and Oucho's van breaks down, they decide to build a rainbow-making disco machine so that they can find a pot of gold.
| 19 | 6 | "Spar-Master" | Jennifer King | Unknown | 6 February 2010 |
Ed and Oucho are in West Yorkshire trying to build Billy's Spar-Master, a karate practice machine.
| 20 | 7 | "Spy Buggy" | Jennifer King | Unknown | 13 February 2010 |
Ed and Oucho are in Willesden trying to build Josh's 'spy buggy', a buggy that can fire secret party messages right under teachers' noses.
| 21 | 8 | "Do It Dancefloor" | Jennifer King | Unknown | 20 February 2010 |
Ed and Oucho are trying to build Sarah's Do It Dancefloor, a sound-activated dancefloor with lights, glitter and a smoke machine.
| 22 | 9 | "Apple Scrumper" | Natalie Moss | Unknown | 27 February 2010 |
Ed and Oucho want some apple pies, so they travel to Wiltshire to attempt to make Wilf's Apple Scrumper invention.
| 23 | 10 | "Horologelator" | Natalie Moss | Unknown | 6 March 2010 |
Ed and Oucho attempt to build the most difficult invention ever, a time machine, so Oscar can fulfil his dream and meet Henry VIII.
| 24 | 11 | "Flosserama" | Natalie Moss | Unknown | 13 March 2010 |
Ed and Oucho travel to Oxfordshire to build a Flosserama – a spinning machine that makes candyfloss for Briony and Amelia.
| 25 | 12 | "Hydro-Bike" | Jennifer King | Unknown | 20 March 2010 |
Ed and Oucho are in Newcastle, trying to build Aidan's 'Hydro-Bike', a bike that goes on land and water.
| 26 | 13 | "Davenportanator" | Natalie Moss | Unknown | 27 March 2010 |
Ed and Oucho need to find out about radio waves if they want to win Carl Trouser's quiz. So they build Hemang's Davenportanator.
