= Justin's House =

British children's comedy TV show

- Genre: Children
- Created by: Justin Fletcher, CBeebies / BBC Children's Productions
- Starring: Justin Fletcher; Steven Kynman; Katherine Smee; Jane Deane; Cat Sandion; Lena Kaur; Katy Ashworth; Rebecca Keatley; Chris Jarvis
- Theme music composer: Jackson Elton
- Opening theme: Justin's House
- Ending theme: Justin's House theme (Instrumental)
- Composer: Barrie Bignold
- Country of origin: United Kingdom
- Original language: English
- No. of series: 6
- No. of episodes: 124

Production
- Executive producers: Paul Shuttleworth; Vanessa Amberleigh Sue Cole
- Producers: Stephen Cannon; Anna Perowne
- Production location: dock10 studios (Series 1-6)
- Editors: Mike Eccles; Andy Richards; Steve Seddon; Jonathan Newton
- Running time: 24 minutes
- Production companies: CBeebies Production (Series 1-4); BBC Studios (Series 5-6)

Original release
- Network: CBeebies
- Release: 8 October 2011 – 25 March 2017
- Release: 25 October 2021 – 30 August 2023

Justin's House is a British children's television comedy show produced by the BBC for CBeebies. It stars host Justin Fletcher, his green Little Monster, and his humanoid general-purpose housekeeping robot Robert.

== Format ==
=== Series 1-4 ===
Justin's House was recorded as a stage series in front of an audience of children, and was filmed at Dock 10 Studios in Manchester.

The show usually starts with Robert singing the "Dusting for Justin" song, before welcoming the audience to Justin's House. This is usually followed by Robert introducing the main theme of the episode, with the help of Little Monster. Justin then makes his entrance, usually through one of the doors in the house, then singing the "Wiggle your Bottoms" song. Justin's entrance usually ends up creating some mess, for instance, in Series 3 Episode 17, he opens the door into Robert, which causes Robert to throw custard pies everywhere. Justin and Robert then sing the Justin's House song. The show always ends with Justin, Robert, and any special guests featured in that episode singing a song.

From Series 2 onwards, there was a colourful staircase next to the front door; each step was a different colour. The staircase leads the upstairs balcony part of the set, which contains Justin's bed, wardrobe and bathroom. In addition, a zebra called Dave is introduced in the opening titles, who flies to Justin's House via hot air balloon and crashes into the wall, staying with his head permanently displayed at the back of the set.

Series 1 was filmed from February 2011 to July 2011, Series 2 was filmed from November 2011 to June 2012, Series 3 was filmed from March 2014 to September 2014 and Series 4 was filmed from June 2016 to November 2016.

=== Series 5-6 ===
Series 5 features a brand-new format and set. The series became more sitcom-based, there is no Dave the Zebra, and Justin's house is newly redecorated. The upstairs cannot be seen, but instead, the characters can go out in the garden, and also into Robert's workshop, which can also be seen in Robert's Memory Download and Pie Cam (series 2). Due to COVID-19 restrictions, Series 5 was recorded within a closed studio without a live audience.

The show usually starts with Robert, then Justin will come in, and together they will sing the 'Who's in the House?' song. The show, like in the previous series, always ends with Justin, Robert, and any special guests featured in that episode singing a song with Justin, Robert and Little Monster. There is a blast of confetti at the end of most episodes. Series 5 was filmed from February 2021 to July 2021.

Series 6 also follows up with this same set and format design, with some additional adjustments made to the set such as an expansion of the porch along with some additional decorations hung around the house.

== Transmissions ==
Series	Start date	End date	Episodes
1	8 October 2011	18 December 2011	23
2	25 August 2012	30 September 2012	25
2	5 January 2013	9 February 2013	25
2	30 March 2013	31 March 2013	25
3	18 October 2014	16 November 2014	20
3	28 February 2015	29 March 2015	20
4	8 October 2016	6 November 2016	20
4	13 December 2016		20
4	25 February 2017	25 March 2017	20
5	25 October 2021	17 November 2021	18
6	7 August 2023	30 August 2023	18

== Characters ==
=== Main ===
- Justin Fletcher as himself. He is a good-hearted and funny man who is a resident of Justin Town. He often gets help whenever downhearted from Robert, with whom he shares a close bond. He is often full of energy, ready to make his friends laugh. This could be by doing some clever talents (eg, balancing something on his nose or playing a pair of spoons), or telling some jokes to them. He also has a running gag, which is getting custard pies or some liquid substance in his face. Despite his silliness, Justin will always be there to support his friends around Justin Town when needed.
  - Fletcher also portrays some of his other characters in some episodes, including original characters Sir Justin-A-Lot of Mess, Justinardo de Stinky and Long Johns Justin, Rapids Johnson from Gigglebiz, and Mr Tumble from Something Special.
- Steven Kynman & Chris Jarvis as Robert the Robot, a humanoid robot butler who helps Justin out around the house regularly. His main priorities are to keep the house as tidy as possible, which is somewhat a chore whenever Justin is around, who often causes mess with his energy. Robert will always calm Justin down if he has too much energy at one particular moment, and can act as a father figure towards him, taking charge of most situations around the house. His favourite sweet treat is cake. Steven Kynman played Robert from Series 1 to mid-Series 6. Chris Jarvis took over the role starting from episode 10 of Series 6.
- Katherine Smee as Little Monster, a naughty green monster who likes to cause havoc and mischief in Justin's House. A running gag of hers is to run away with various objects and hide with them at various locations around the house. She owns her own den under the floorboards of the house, which is never seen by viewers until Series 5. There, she keeps many items she is fond of, which only Little Monsters love.
  - Smee also puppeteers Cousin Cuddle, Little Monster's pink cousin, who is even more naughty than she is, and Auntie Monsterella.

=== Recurring ===
- Jane Deane as Dee Livery, a unicycling delivery woman. (Series 1)
- Lena Kaur as Mac, one of Justin and Robert's neighbours and explorers. (Series 3)
- Cat Sandion as Cat, Justin and Robert's other neighbour and former explorer. (Series 4-6)
- Alex Phelps as Tom From Next Door But One, the local dog walker of Justin Town. (Series 5)
- Sam Yetunde as Cherry The Baker (Series 5-6)
- Ashley Joseph as Gary From Round The Corner (Series 6)
- Gemma Arrowsmith as Mrs Wilson From Down The Street (Series 6)

=== Guest stars ===
The series also features many guest stars, ranging from existing CBeebies stars to other personalities. They either portray original characters made for the series or play themselves.

- Ben Faulks as Mr Bloom
- Andy Day

== Episodes ==
=== Series 1 (2011) ===
No.	Title	Written by	Original release date
1	"Moving In"	Iain Lauchlan	8 October 2011
Justin is excited to move into his new home, but he finds out that there are other people living there. Guest Star: Steven Arnold as Mr. Finch Bottom Songs: 1. Wibble Wobble; 2. Justin's House
2	"House Warming"	Iain Lauchlan	9 October 2011
Settled into his new home, Justin decides to hold a housewarming party, but things go wrong. Guest Stars: Alex Winters, Andy Day, Nisha Anil Songs: 1. Justin's House; 2. Party Party
3	"The Tidy Prize"	Lotte Elwell	15 October 2011
Chris is visiting Justin, hoping to find cleanness and tidiness in Justin's House. Guest Star: Chris Jarvis Songs: 1. Justin's House; 2. If You're Happy And You Know It
4	"Robert's Inventions"	Ben Courtney	16 October 2011
Robert thinks his inventions are handy, but one of his new ones – a hair tonic, turns people's hair into the wrong colour. Guest Star: Katrina Bryan as Nina Songs: 1. Justin's House; 2. Head, Shoulders, Knees and Toes
5	"Bake That Cake"	Stephen Cannon	22 October 2011
With how well Robert has done with keeping the house tidy and clean, Justin bakes him a cake. Songs: 1. Justin's House; 2. The Copying Song
6	"Auntie Justina Visits"	Justin Fletcher	23 October 2011
It's all well in Justin's House until everybody finds out that Auntie Justina is coming, and it's gonna be a disaster! Guest Star: Anne Charleston as Auntie Justina Songs: 1. Justin's House; 2. If You're Happy And You Know It
7	"Suits You Justin"	Stephen Cannon	29 October 2011
Justin attempts to get his suit all clean. Songs: 1. Justin's House; 2. We like it here
8	"Race Day"	Katie Simmons	30 October 2011
Justin is determined to beat Chris and Dee on Race Day. Guest Star: Chris Jarvis Songs: 1. Justin's House; 2. Jelly On A Plate
9	"Starting With Art"	Stephen Cannon	5 November 2011
Little Monster wants to paint a picture, but she wants to use the same things as Justin. Guest Star: Phil Gallagher as Mister Maker Songs: 1. Justin's House; 2. Hokey Cokey
10	"Little Monster's Bath"	Justin Fletcher	6 November 2011
Justin and Robert attempt to bathe Little Monster. Songs: 1. ABC 123; 2. Justin's House
11	"Get Fit Justin"	Paddy Kempshall	12 November 2011
One of Robert's new inventions is supposed to keep Justin all fit and strong, but it ends up causing a lot of trouble for Justin instead. Guest Star: Katy Ashworth Songs: 1. Justin's House; 2. Musical Instrument Song
12	"Pandamonium"	Barry Quinn	13 November 2011
When Nisha invites one of her panda friends, Moosh, to visit Justin's House. However, Justin and Robert end up losing her. Guest Star: Nisha Anil Songs: 1. Jelly On A Plate; 2. Justin's House
13	"Robert Gets Converted"	Steven Kynman	19 November 2011
Robert accidentally uses one of his inventions on himself and now speaks in gibberish! Guest Star: Katrina Bryan as Nina Songs: 1. Justin's House; 2. Wibble Wobble; Note: This episode features a post-credits scene.
14	"Robert's Holiday"	Paddy Kempshall	20 November 2011
Justin suggests to Robert that he should take a holiday, even if he doesn't want to! Songs: 1. Hokey Cokey; 2. Justin's House
15	"The Bloomer Plant"	Anna Perowne	26 November 2011
Justin and Robert are unsure if any of the recyclable items in the house are good for Mr. Bloom's Nursery. Guest Star: Ben Faulks as Mr. Bloom Songs: 1. Musical Instrument Song; 2. Justin's House
16	"Blocked Pipes"	Tracey Hamett	27 November 2011
Robert and Justin find a furry flitter in their pipes, but it won't get out! Songs: 1. ABC 123; 2. Justin's House
17	"Cousin Cuddle"	Stephen Cannon	3 December 2011
Little Monster's cousin Cuddle is coming to visit Justin's House. Will Cuddle be easier to control, or as naughty as Little Monster? Songs: 1. Justin's House; 2. Musical Instrument Song
18	"The Singing Lesson"	Clare Bradley	4 December 2011
Justin thinks that Robert's friend Jodie is coming in for a singing lesson. Guest Star: Jodie Prenger Songs: 1. Justin's House; 2. Consider Yourself At Home
19	"The Sleepover"	Steven Kynman	10 December 2011
Something is causing a mess every night in Justin's House. However, when Mister Maker comes round for a sleepover, he might be the answer to the problem. Guest Star: Phil Gallagher as Mister Maker Songs: 1. Justin's House; 2. Head, Shoulders, Knees and Toes
20	"The Wishing Wardrobe"	Philippa Rae	11 December 2011
Mysterious and magical things are happening on Dressing Up Day, and Justin cannot decide on a costume. Guest Star: Katy Ashworth Songs: 1. Justin's House; 2. The Copying Song
21	"Little Monster & the Box of Tricks"	Anna Berrington	17 December 2011
Little Monster is feeling sad, and Justin and Robert don't know what to do. Guest Star: Nisha Anil Songs: 1. Wibble Wobble; 2. Justin's House
22	"Little Pot of Bothers"	Antonia Miller	18 December 2011
Justin and Robert accidentally use the wrong plant food in their new flower, which turns it into a monster that threatens to eat up the house. Guest Star: Ben Faulks as Mr. Bloom Songs: 1. Justin's House; 2. Monster Bloomers
23	"All Wrapped Up"	Stephen Cannon	23 December 2011
Justin's attempts at helping Robert and Little Monster at helping with the Christmas decorations and presents prove to be problematic. Guest Stars: Katrina Bryan as Nina, Cerrie Burnell, Samuel, Edward and William Wakefield as Santa's Helpers Songs: 1. Justin's House; 2. Jolly Old Saint Nicholas; Note: This is a Christmas Special.

=== Series 2 (2012–2013) ===
No.	Title	Written by	Original release date
24	"Hottyspottyitis"	Lucy Beckitt	25 August 2012
Justin and Little Monster have a strange illness. Whenever they sneeze, something messy occurs. Guest Star: Roger Chucklefoot as Juan Man Band Songs: 1. Justin's House; 2. Here's a Game
25	"Little Monster's Birthday"	Adam Redfern	26 August 2012
Today is Little Monster's birthday, and as usual for a birthday in Justin Town, things get incredibly messy. Guest Stars: Chris Jarvis, Pui Fan Lee Songs: 1. Justin's House; 2. To the Party Beat
26	"Superturbo Robo"	Paddy Kempshall	1 September 2012
Justin decides to help Robert out with a superturbo robot called Roberta. Guest Stars: Penni Tovey as Roberta, John Farnworth as Keepy Uppy Songs: 1. Justin's House; 2. Beep‚ Bop
27	"Going For Gold"	Jon Hancock	2 September 2012
Justin's house hosts the first-ever Justinship Games, and Justin dreams of winning a gold medal. Guest Stars: Nick Wilton as Charlie Championships, Heather Mann as Summer Salt Songs: 1. Justin's House; 2. We're Going for Gold
28	"The Mystery Pong"	Paddy Kempshall	8 September 2012
Justin the detective needs to detect where a mysterious pong is coming from. Guest Stars: Katrina Bryan as Nina, Ian Marchant as Mr. Hatrick the Hat Seller Songs: 1. Justin's House; 2. I Spy
29	"House For Sale"	Luk Ying Yick & Anna Perowne	9 September 2012
Robert and Little Monster concoct a plan to stop Justin from selling his house. Guest Stars: Sally Phillips as Wanda Round, Roger Chucklefoot as Juan Man Band Songs: 1. Justin's House; 2. If You're Happy and You Know It
30	"Back in Time"	Anna Perowne	15 September 2012
Justin builds a time machine and transports everyone in the house back in time. Songs: 1. Justin's House; 2. Way Down in Justin Town
31	"Posh Nosh"	Justin Fletcher	16 September 2012
Robert cannot get Justin's Cake-a-Pulter Hundred Thousand to work. This is a job for Roberta the robot. Guest Star: Penni Tovey as Roberta Songs: 1. Justin's House; 2. The Robo-Cokey
32	"Just The Part"	Chris Jarvis	22 September 2012
Chris and Pui want to put on a play in Justin Town and Justin's house is the perfect place to do it. Guest Stars: Chris Jarvis, Pui Fan Lee Songs: 1. Justin's House; 2. Our Instrument Song
33	"The Snow Monster"	Justin Fletcher	23 September 2012
A snow monster has been spotted up Monster Mountain. Justin decides to go exploring to try to spot it. Songs: 1. Justin's House; 2. We are the Monster Movers
34	"Best In Show"	Iwan Watson	29 September 2012
A trophy is the star prize at the vehicle show. Justin and Robert try to get Justin's car ready. Guest Stars: Katrina Bryan as Nina, Joe Oakley as Will Songs: 1. Justin's House; 2. Driving in Justin Town
35	"Zooper Dooper"	John Sayle	30 September 2012
When the heating at the Justin Town Zoo breaks down, all the animals need somewhere to stay. Songs: 1. Justin's House; 2. Here's a Game
36	"Just In Space"	Justin Fletcher	5 January 2013
The race is on in Justin's house to fill the one remaining space in the Justin Town Space Mission. Guest Stars: Nicholas Khan as Star Jumper & Mr Tailor, Ian Jamieson as Roger Over Songs: 1. Justin's House; 2. We're Zooming to the Moon
37	"The House of Justin"	Katie Simmons	6 January 2013
Justin's house opens its doors as a department store for the first ever time. Guest Star: Andy Day Songs: 1. Justin's House; 2. Jelly on a Plate
38	"Just For Fun"	Steven Kynman	12 January 2013
Special guest Mister Maker helps bring all the fun of the fair to Justin's house. Guest Stars: Phil Gallagher as Mister Maker, Melanie Williams as Tallulah Hula Songs: 1. Justin's House; 2. To the Party Beat
39	"Justin Rocks"	Geoff Coward	13 January 2013
The first ever Justinbury Music Festival is taking place inside Justin's house. Guest Stars: Phillip Ratcliffe, Kim Wellens and Abbi Phillips as Cake Mix Band Members, Bellatrix as Melody Songs: 1. Justin's House; 2. When You're Down
40	"Justin's House Hotel"	Justin Fletcher	19 January 2013
Justin's house opens its doors as a hotel. Guest Star: Nicholas Khan as Mr. Tailor Songs: 1. Justin's House; 2. Heads‚ Shoulders‚ Knees and Toes
41	"Monster Sitting"	Tracey Hammett	20 January 2013
There is a Grand Robot Ball in Justin Town, the perfect way for Robert to recharge his batteries. Guest Star: Sharon D. Clarke as Dakota Sleep Songs: 1. Justin's House; 2. Jelly on a Plate
42	"Just In A Dream"	Geoff Coward	26 January 2013
Robert invents a dream machine to discover the funny thing that Justin is dreaming about. Guest Star: Himself as Justin Town Cheerleaders Songs: 1. Justin's House; 2. When You're Dozy
43	"Justin's Justin Times"	John Sayle	27 January 2013
Justin and Robert do their best to print the Justin Times. Guest Star: Andy Day Songs: 1. Justin's House; 2. Driving Through Justin Town
44	"The Tooth Fairy"	Steven Kynman	2 February 2013
When Little Monster's tooth falls out, everybody hopes the tooth fairy will visit Justin's house. Guest Star: Sharon D. Clarke as Dakota Sleep Songs: 1. Justin's House; 2. The Hokey Cokey
45	"Just Tins of Paint"	Tony Reed	3 February 2013
Justin hopes his attempt at home improvements will win Mister Maker's Makeover Challenge. Guest Star: Phil Gallagher as Mister Maker Songs: 1. Justin's House; 2. When You're Down
46	"Little Monster's Den"	Iwan Watson	9 February 2013
Things get very messy when Justin and Robert try to make Little Monster a gingerbread den. Songs: 1. Justin's House; 2. I Spy
47	"Robert's Memory Download"	Unknown	30 March 2013
Justin, Robert and Little Monster remember funny things that have happened in Justin's House. Songs: 1. Justin's House; Note: This is a clip show.
48	"Pie Cam"	Unknown	31 March 2013
Little Monster has an invention that helps everyone laugh at some of the messiest times in Justin's House. Songs: 1. Justin's House; 2. When You're Dozy; Note: This is a clip show.

=== Series 3 (2014–2015) ===
No.	Title	Written by	Original release date
49	"The New Neighbour"	Simon A.Brown	18 October 2014
Justin, Robert and Little Monster are surprised to meet their exciting new neighbour, Mac the Neighbour. Songs: 1. Justin's House; 2. When You're Down
50	"Bustin Grooves"	George Sawyer	19 October 2014
Robert invites supercool pop star Bustin Grooves to lunch, but no matter what they do, Bustin just won't sing. Guest Star: Darren Hart as Bustin Grooves Songs: 1. Justin's House; 2. Here's a Game
51	"Cake Factory"	Nathan Cockerill	25 October 2014
Things turn messy when Robert invents a cake-making machine. Guest Stars: Katy Ashworth, Lewis Dark, Gemma McGhee and Billie Green as Party Entertainers Songs: 1. Justin's House; 2. Wibble Wobble
52	"Royal Visit"	Hannah George & James Whitehouse	26 October 2014
Justin, Robert and Little Monster prepare for a special visit from the king, but will Justin's House be fun enough to get the royal seal of approval? Guest Stars: Chris Jarvis as King Chris the First, Pui Fan Lee as Cortia Pui, Tink Bruce Songs: 1. Justin's House; 2. Our Instrument Song
53	"Robert's Book"	Gerard Foster	1 November 2014
Robert is trying to read a book, but Justin and Little Monster really want him to play with them instead. Guest Stars: Sandy McClure and Tim Chown as Best Entertainers Songs: 1. Justin's House; 2. The Robo Cokey
54	"Very Pongy Cheese"	Tony Reed	2 November 2014
Justin and Robert get given some very pongy cheese, but the horrible smell makes Little Monster run away and attracts the attention of Funella Furchester and a very cheeky mouse. Guest Star: Louise Gold as Funella Furchester Songs: 1. Justin's House; 2. We are the Monster Movers
55	"Dance Competition"	Katherine Jakeways	8 November 2014
Justin enters himself and Robert into a dance competition, but Justin keeps getting too excited. Guest Stars: Darren Hart as Mr. Leo Tard, Blake Clayfield, Charise Renouf Songs: 1. Justin's House; 2. Wibble Wobble
56	"Granny Justina"	George Sawyer	9 November 2014
Justin dresses up as Granny Justina when he and Robert forget to invite her round for a special tea party with Katy. Guest Stars: Katy Ashworth, Elaine Mackenzie-Ellis as Granny Justina Songs: 1. Justin's House; 2. Our Instrument Song
57	"Super Justin"	Daniel Bays & Adam Redfern	15 November 2014
When everybody decides to dress up as superheroes, Robert is disappointed as he doesn't have a costume. Guest Stars: Rebecca Keatley, Sidney Sloane, Vicki Lane and Darren Johnson as Staff Members Songs: 1. Justin's House; 2. When You're Down
58	"Pirate Day"	Simon A.Brown	16 November 2014
The stars of Swashbuckle drop in for Pirate Day. Guest Stars: Gemma Hunt as herself, Ella Kenion as Captain Sinker Songs: 1. Justin's House; 2. To the Pirate Beat
59	"A Magical Day"	Justin Fletcher	22 November 2014
Justin wants to perform magic, So Robert calls in the help of a real magician. Guest Star: Michael J Fitch Songs: 1. Justin's House; 2. To the Party Beat
60	"Justinosaurus"	Gerard Foster	23 November 2014
Justin decides to dig up a dinosaur and turn Justin's House into a dinosaur museum. Songs: 1. Justin's House; 2. We are the Dino Movers
61	"Dustomatic 3000"	Simon A. Brown	29 November 2014
Justin accidentally throws away Robert's favourite duster, so Justin tries to cheer him up. Guest Star: Saul Eisenberg as Junkman Songs: 1. Justin's House; 2. Heads and Shoulders‚ Knees and Toes
62	"The Wishing Wand"	Marie Crook	30 November 2014
Justin and Robert get their hands on a magical wishing Wand, but their wishes soon get out of control. Guest Stars: The Highwaymen Drum Corps Songs: 1. Justin's House; 2. Our Instrument Song
63	"Oogie Boogie Plant"	Mike James	14 March 2015
Justin, Robert and Little Monster try to look after a giant and a rather naughty plant for Mr. Bloom. Guest Stars: Ben Faulks as Mr. Bloom, Richard David-Caine as the Ooogie Boogie Plant Songs: 1. Justin's House; 2. Wibble Wobble
64	"Robot of the Year"	Nathan Cockerill	15 March 2015
Robert is nervous about passing his tests, so Justin decides to take the tests for him. Guest Stars: Rebecca Keatley, Sidney Sloane Songs: 1. Justin's House; 2. The Robo Cokey
65	"Blocked Pipe"	Jon Hancock	21 March 2015
Little Monster blocks up the pipes and Robert calls in the help of Cook and Line from Swashbuckle. Guest Stars: Joseph Elliott as Cook, Richard David-Caine as Line Songs: 1. Justin's House; 2. Here's a Game
66	"Robert's Memory Chips"	Becky Overton	22 March 2015
Justin needs to fix Robert after his memory chips accidentally come loose. Songs: 1. Justin's House; 2. When You're Down; Note: This is a Clip Show.
67	"A Day at the Beach"	Hannah George & James Whitehouse	28 March 2015
Robert cannot go to the real beach, so Justin and Mac turn Justin's House into a beach instead. Guest Star: Paul Hawkyard as Ernie Starboard Songs: 1. Justin's House; 2. When You're Down
68	"Justin's Favourite Song"	Becky Overton	29 March 2015
Justin is in a singing mood so Robert, Mac and Little Monster help Justin pick his favourite song. Songs: 1. Justin's House; 2. Here's a Game; 3. Our Instrument Song; 4. We are the Monster Movers; 5. When You're Down; 6. Wibble Wobble; 7. Megamix Song; Note: This is a Clip Show.

=== Series 4 (2016–2017) ===
No.	Title	Written by	Original release date
69	"Justin's Last Badge"	George Sawyer	7 October 2016
Things don't quite go as planned when Justin tries to get his wild camping badge. Songs: 1. Justin's House; 2. When You're Down
70	"The Dusterlings"	Nathan Cockerill	14 October 2016
The mischievous Dusterlings go rogue, making a mess of the house and tickling anyone that moves. Guest Stars: James Lyons as James, Neil Sterenberg as the Dusterlings Songs: 1. Justin's House; 2. Our Instrument Song
71	"Remote Control Suit"	Amanda Graham	21 October 2016
Things go wrong when Justin becomes Robert's butler foe the day in order to host a cake party. Guest Stars: Callum Donnelly, Richard Franks and Robin Hatcher as Cake Testers Songs: 1. Justin's House; 2. Our Instrument Song
72	"Secret Sock Detective"	Becky Overton	28 October 2016
Justin has lost his favourite socks and is convinced that someone must have taken them. Guest Star: Haruka Kuroda as the Secret Detective Songs: 1. Justin's House; 2. Wibble Wobble
73	"Robot Day"	Gerard Foster	4 November 2016
Things turn messy when Justin surprises Robert and gives his best robot friend a day to remember. Guest Stars: Joseph Elliott as Cook, Richard David-Caine as Line Songs: 1. Justin's House; 2. To the Party Beat
74	"Climate Mate"	Rose Johnson & Camille Ucan	11 November 2016
Robert tries hard to get his latest Climate-Mate invention working properly to cool down the temperature.
75	"Giggle Gasket"	Andrew Emerson	18 November 2016
Justin must help his best friend Robert get his laughter back after his Giggle Gasket breaks.
76	"Powercut Party"	Anna Berrington	25 November 2016
Justin and Robert must learn to work together to get the lights and TV working after a power cut. Guest Stars: Glamba as the Mechanics
77	"Justin's Comet"	Gerard Foster	2 December 2016
Justin and Robert have a stargazing party to watch Justin's Comet. Guest Star: Dr Maggie Aderin-Pocock as herself
78	"Just Us"	Ciaran Murtagh & Andrew Barnett Jones	9 December 2016
Justin, Robert and Little Monster are excited to spend the day with their friends.
79	"Cat's First Christmas"	Simon A Brown	16 December 2016
Justin, Robert and Little Monster try to make sure Cat has a perfect Christmas. Guest Stars: Ben Faulks as Mr. Bloom, The Lindley Junior School Choir as the North Pole Elf Choir
80	"Once Upon A Time"	Ellen Evans	23 December 2016
Justin and Robert go on a pirate night out and Cat tries to reignite Little Monster's passion for books. Guest Stars: Joseph Elliott as Cook, Richard David-Caine as Line
81	"Lights! Camera! Action!"	Justin Fletcher	30 December 2016
Justin has spent days watching his entire film collection and now wants to make his own action film. Guest Stars: The UKCF Acrobats as Stunt Tumblers
82	"Cat's Lost Bag"	Simon A Brown	14 January 2017
Cat lost her favourite Cat Pack, so Robert calls on someone special to help look for it. Guest Star: Justin Fletcher as Mr Tumble
83	"Growing Gloop"	Andrew Emerson	21 January 2017
Mr. Bloom gives Justin a Super Swellberry, which contains magical 'growing gloop' to help the plant grow. Guest Stars: Ben Faulks as Mr. Bloom, Felix Forbes-McNeil as Little Justin
84	"The Perfect Photo"	Davey Moore	28 January 2017
Famous photographer Iris Shutterspeed is coming to take a group picture of the gang to send to Granny Justina. Guest Star: Freddie Stabb as Iris Shutterspeed
85	"Justin’s Lost Voice"	Ciaran Murtagh & Andrew Barnett Jones	28 January 2017
Justin has been singing so loudly all day that he has lost his voice, so Robert tries to help him out.
86	"Reggie the Robot"	Mark O'Hanlon	4 February 2017
Robert's much cooler younger brother Reggie is coming to visit Justin's House, so Robert tries everything he can to show that he can be just as cool. Guest Star: Ben Faulks as Reggie the Robot
87	"Alien Visitors"	Callum Donnelly, Richard Franks & Robin Hatcher	11 February 2017
Three messy Aliens called the Odd Bods turn up on the doorstep and start causing chaos around Justin's House. Guest Stars: Callum Donnelly, Richard Franks and Robin Hatcher as the Oddbod Aliens
88	"Cat Unpacks"	Ciaran Murtagh & Andrew Barnett Jones	18 February 2017
Cat is about to go on another big adventure but her Cat-Pack is too full and too heavy to carry. Note: This is a Clip Show

=== Series 5 (2021) ===
No.	Title	Written by	Original release date
89	"Papering Pandemonium"	Matt Brown & Ben Ward	25 October 2021
Justin's House has been redecorated, courtesy of Robert. Justin loves it, but creates a mess by doing a scooter disco inside.
90	"Monster Truck"	Teresa Burns, Samantha Lyden & Ben Ward	26 October 2021
It's the day of the Justin Town monster truck race, and Justin and Robert have prepared a special surprise for Little Monster.
91	"Teddy Bears' Picnic"	Simon A. Brown & Ben Ward	27 October 2021
It's time for a Teddy Bears' picnic in the House's garden. Robert accidentally invites two bears to the picnic after a creating an advert about it for the Justin Times. Guest Stars: Rapids Johnson And Julia Frost and Kim Scopes as the Bears
92	"In the Doghouse"	Dominic Burgess & Ben Ward	28 October 2021
Justin and Robert look after three dogs for a day, but Robert isn't happy when Justin's House becomes the messiest it has ever been!
93	"The Pirates of Justin Town"	Ben Cajee & Ben Ward	29 October 2021
Justin is hoping to play the part of a pirate captain in a brand-new musical, but he has to compete with an actual pirate for the role! Guest Star: Jennie Dale as Captain Captain
94	"Catwalk Chaos"	Rose Johnson, Camille Jade Ucan & Ben Ward	1 November 2021
It's Monster Fashion week, and Justin and Robert are helping Little Monster find a fashionable outfit to wear on the catwalk.
95	"Busy Buzzy Day"	Becky Overton & Ben Ward	2 November 2021
Cherry runs out of honey to make some slices, so Justin and Robert have to collect some for her. The only problem is that Justin does not know how to collect honey!
96	"Party Games"	Gez Foster & Ben Ward	3 November 2021
Robert is worried about going to parties because he always loses at games. Justin helps to teach Robert some games, but he starts to enjoy winning a bit too much!
97	"Cat's New Job"	Adam Toth	4 November 2021
Justin, Robert and Little Monster are excited to sit down in front of their TV because their neighbour, Cat, has a new job as the Justin Town newsreader.
98	"Justin's Bed and Lunch"	Charlie Lawlor & Ben Ward	5 November 2021
Justin's House is opened as a small hotel, and one of the guests is a reporter with a reputation for giving terrible reviews! Guest Stars: Jennie Dale as Holly Day, Paul Zerdin as himself
99	"Gopher It!"	Justin Fletcher & Ben Ward	8 November 2021
Robert manages to disturb a gopher who has been living in the attic. The gopher goes loose, chewing the house apart, so Justin has to ask Tom to help with the problem. Guest Star: Neil Sterenberg as the Gopher
100	"Justin's Brilliant Idea"	Becky Overton	9 November 2021
It's the day of the science fair, and Justin has had a brilliant idea for an invention! The problem is, he can't remember what the idea was.
101	"Monster Camp"	Jess Parker & Ben Ward	10 November 2021
Little Monster is going on her first Monster Camp, but she feels nervous about going away, so Monster Camp comes to Justin's House instead! Guest Star: Warrick Brownlow-Pike as Dodge T Dog
102	"Justi Moment"	James Bishop, Chris Douch & Ben Ward	11 November 2021
Robert becomes jealous of Justi, Justin's new voice-activated machine that can do just about anything!
103	"The Jam Session"	James Bishop, Chris Douch & Ben Ward	12 November 2021
Robert, Little Monster, Cat and Cherry get a chance to audition to join YolanDa and her house band, but when YolanDa arrives, they get all too nervous to play! Guest Star: YolanDa Brown
104	"Stay Inn"	Kara Smith & Ben Ward	15 November 2021
Justin, Robert and Little Monster are going on holiday. Robert leads them to a surprise location, the Justin's House Holiday Park!
105	"Night-Time Noises"	Adam Toth & Anna Perowne	16 November 2021
A mysterious sound in the middle of the night is keeping everyone awake, but no one can work out where it's coming from.
106	"Robert's Home Movies"	Anna Perowne & Ben Ward	17 November 2021
Only in Justin Town could be sunny, snowy and rain slime all in one day, so Justin, Robert and Little Monster stay in and enjoy Robert's new setting, 'home movie mode'!

=== Series 6 (2023) ===
No.	Title	Written by	Original release date
107	"That's Entertainment"	Trevor Neal	7 August 2023
Cat is filming a TV show all about everyday life, but Justin and Robert find it very hard. Songs: 1. Who's in the House?; 2. Justin's House Party
108	"Pizza the Action"	Andy Potter	8 August 2023
Cherry makes a new pizza that no-one likes, but they all try to be polite. Songs: 1. Who's in the House?; 2. Justin's House
109	"Little Monster Hibernates"	Stefan Gibbons-Arif	9 August 2023
Everyone thinks Little Monster is hibernating, so they try to be quiet for her to sleep. Songs: 1. Who's in the House?; 2. Justin's House Party
110	"The Big Split"	Nathan Cockerill	10 August 2023
Justin and Robert keep getting in each other's way, so they split the house with a wall. Songs: 1. Who's in the House?; 2. Good Friends
111	"Football Fun"	Hannah George	11 August 2023
Cat is trying out for the local football team, so Justin and Robert help her train. Songs: 1. Who's in the House?; 2. Go for it
112	"Computer Bug"	Omari McCarthy	14 August 2023
Robert gets a computer bug, so Justin gives him his favourite video game to help him relax. Songs: 1. Who's in the House?; 2. Good Friends
113	"Cat's Busy Day"	Andy Potter	15 August 2023
Everyone needs help in Justin's House. Luckily, Cat is always happy to lend a hand. Songs: 1. Who's in the House?; 2. Go for it; Note: Steven Kynman made his last appearance as Robert the Robot in the series.
114	"Sensible Training"	Geoff Coward	16 August 2023
Robert's old teacher is coming to check on the house, but Justin is being very silly. Songs: 1. Who's in the House?; 2. Let's Wibble and Wobble
115	"Party Animals"	Gerard Foster	17 August 2023
Justin throws an animal-themed fancy-dress party for all his friends! Songs: 1. Who's in the House?; 2. Let's Wibble and Wobble
116	"Mess Alarm"	Gerard Foster	18 August 2023
Robert makes a mess alarm to stop the house from getting messy. Songs: 1. Who's in the House?; 2. Justin's House; Note: Chris Jarvis made his debut as Robert The Robot.
117	"Hide and Surprise"	Isabel Fay	21 August 2023
Andy and The Odd Socks hide around Justin's House before playing a surprise gig! Songs: 1. Who's in the House?; 2. Andy and Odd Socks Song
118	"Art Class"	Trevor Neal	22 August 2023
Justin organises an art class for the house, and things get very messy! Songs: 1. Who's in the House?; 2. Go for it
119	"Circus"	Justin Fletcher	23 August 2023
Roll up! Roll up! Justin puts on a circus for Cat and creates a big top in Justin's House. Songs: 1. Who's in the House?; 2. Good Friends
120	"Caterpillar Chaos"	Nathan Cockerill	24 August 2023
It's the prettiest town competition, but a caterpillar has eaten all the flowers! Songs: 1. Who's in the House?; 2. Go for it
121	"Scarecrow"	Jackson Elton	25 August 2023
Justin and Robert build a scarecrow to protect the vegetable seeds that they have planted. Songs: 1. Who's in the House?; 2. Good Friends
122	"Auntie Big Monster"	Jackson Elton	28 August 2023
Little Monster's auntie is coming to stay, but she is very different to him. Songs: 1. Who's in the House?; 2. Justin's House
123	"Fun Run"	Jack Elton	29 August 2023
Justin must lay the course of the Justin Town Fun Run, but will he make it fun enough? Songs: 1. Who's in the House?; 2. Justin's House
124	"Mrs Wilson House-sits"	Jackson Elton	30 August 2023
Aliens gate-land at Justin's House, and Mrs Wilson has to help them get home! Songs: 1. Who's in the House?; 2. Justin's House

== Home media ==
Series 1 and 2 have been released on DVD by Dazzler Media, under license from the BBC.

DVD title	Release date	Series	Included episodes
Where Are You Little Monster?	18 May 2015	1	"Moving In"; "House Warming"; "The Tidy Prize"; "Robert's Inventions"; "Bake That Cake"; "Suits You Justin"; "Little Monster's Bath"
Robert the Robot's Holiday	20 July 2015	1	"The Wishing Wardrobe"; "Race Day"; "Starting With Art"; "Get Fit Justin"; "Pandamonium"; "Robert Gets Converted"; "Robert's Holiday"
Christmas All Wrapped Up	5 October 2015	1	"The Bloomer Plant"; "Blocked Pipes"; "Cousin Cuddle"; "The Singing Lesson"; "Little Monster and the Box of Tricks"; "All Wrapped Up"; "The Snow Monster"
Oh No, It's Auntie Justina!	15 February 2016	1 and 2	"Auntie Justina Visits"; "Sleepover"; "Little Pot of Bothers"; "Hottyspottyitis"; "Best in Show"; "Zooper Dooper"
Going for Gold	25 July 2016	2	"Just in Space"; "Going for Gold"; "The House of Justin"; "Just for Fun"; "Justin Rocks"; "Justin's House Hotel"; "Monster Sitting"
The Tooth Fairy	24 October 2016	2	"The Tooth Fairy"; "Just In a Dream"; "Little Monster's Birthday"; "Justin's Justin Times"; "Just Tins of Paint"; "Little Monster's Den"; "Robert's Memory Download"
The Mystery Pong	February 6, 2017	2	"The Mystery Pong"; "Pie Cam"; "Superturbo Robo"; "House for Sale"; "Back in Time"; "Posh Nosh"; "Just the Part"
