= Odagiri effect =

Television phenomenon

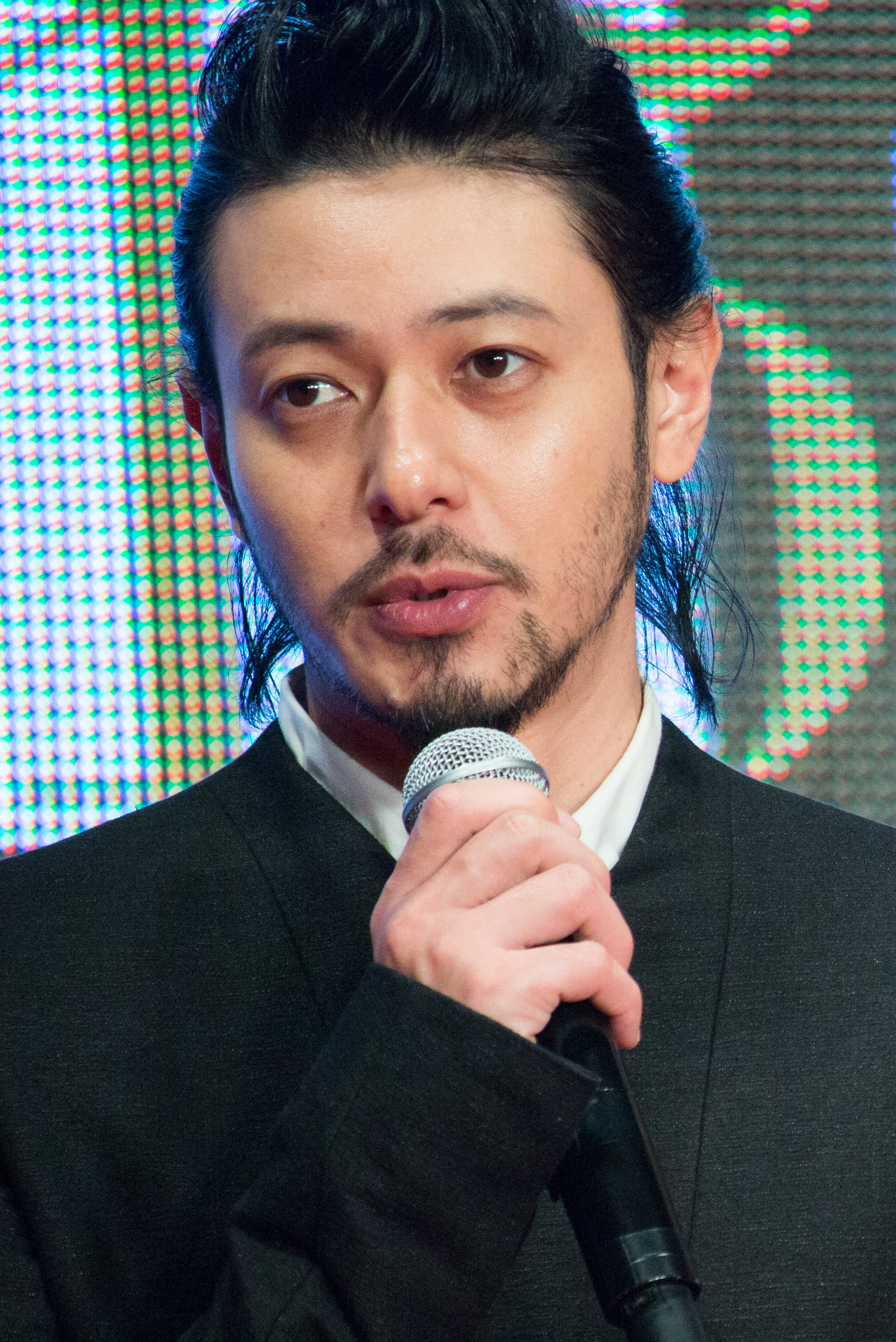
Actor Joe Odagiri, after whom the "Odagiri effect" is named.

The Odagiri effect (Japanese: オダギリ効果, Hepburn: Odagiri kōka) is a television phenomenon in which a program attracts a larger than expected number of female viewers because the program stars attractive male actors or characters. It is named after the Japanese actor Joe Odagiri, who starred in the 2000 tokusatsu show Kamen Rider Kuuga. The effect is now deployed deliberately in some shows, and is most commonly used in sports-themed and idol-themed anime.

== Origin ==
The term "Odagiri effect" originated in Kamen Rider Kuuga, a tokusatsu television series aimed at children and early teens. However, the producers discovered that the show attracted two large audience groups: children between the ages of 4 and 12, at whom the show was originally aimed; and women around the age of 30. The show drew large viewership numbers from the viewing children's mothers, who found lead actor Joe Odagiri attractive. Following this, Odagiri went on to a more high-profile career, while the follow-up series, Kamen Rider Agito attempted to re-create the effect by casting three attractive male actors in the lead. Again, the show attracted large numbers of female viewers, although long-term viewers, mostly men, disapproved.

== Use in anime ==
The Odagiri effect is widely used in sports-themed and idol anime series. Among the shows where the effect has been claimed to have been identified include Kuroko's Basketball, Free!, Yowamushi Pedal, Days, The Prince of Tennis, Prince of Stride, All Out!!, Cheer Boys!!, Yuri on Ice, Hetalia: Axis Powers and Cute High Earth Defense Club Love!. Many of these shows attract fujoshi, yaoi fans, and to a lesser extent gay men.

== Use in western media ==
Ian Wolf from Anime UK News has argued that the Odagiri effect is evident in TV shows and other media found in the west. Examples include the 2015 BBC production of Poldark which attracted large audiences due to depictions of lead actor Aidan Turner shirtless; the 2016 BBC production of The Night Manager which features a scene in which Tom Hiddleston's naked buttocks are on-screen; and the erotic novel Fifty Shades of Grey. He has also argued Benedict Cumberbatch starring in the TV series Sherlock has caused the Odagiri effect to occur in other series he has appeared in such as the radio series Cabin Pressure.

Paralleling the original example, the CBeebies show Mr Bloom's Nursery, a UK TV programme featuring Ben Faulks in the title role, became popular with a mature female audience.

== Positives and negatives of the effect ==
The effect is said to have both a positive and negative effect. While such shows attract wider audiences, some critics claim that they "play it safe" and that: "Negative arcs about injury or lack of sportsmanship are resolved quickly and neatly, and while friendship abounds, romantic subplots are nowhere in sight. There's no incentive to risk alienating any of the target audiences, so the show stays away from tackling complicated themes." Another positive effect of the Odagiri effect for anime producers is that female fans increase spending power, thus meaning they are more likely to buy merchandise relating to the series in question.

There are also claims that the effect shows that there is sexism in program making. Reasons given include that a similar observable effect in which men were attracted to TV shows featuring attractive female actresses and characters would be commented on differently. It is also argued that the effect shows that there is evidence that not enough programmes are being made that target women.
