= List of idol anime and manga =

Japanese anime industry genre

Idol (アイドル, aidoru) anime and manga are a category of Japanese fictional media centered on idols, a type of entertainer in their teens and early 20s marketed to have a close relationship with their fans and commercialized through merchandise. Beginning in the 1980s, anime was used as a vehicle to promote an up-and-coming idol's singing career, but has since then created various anime media mix projects centering on fictional singers.

== Themes ==
Idol-themed series use a media mix marketing strategy. Initially, idol-themed series were used to promote music activities for the singers starring in them. Due to the popularity of the characters, the marketing projects are centered on promoting the characters' music and merchandise in real life. Idol-themed series are linked to the Odagiri effect for featuring attractive people of the same gender interacting with each other, and they are also compared to sports series for using themes centered on team-building and competitiveness.

== History ==
In Japan, the concept of an "idol" singer first came into prominence after the 1963 film Cherchez l'idole was released in the country, with Japanese audiences becoming fascinated with Sylvie Vartan and praising both her musical talent and youthful appearance. Her popularity led Japanese entertainment companies to address young singers who shared her aesthetic as "idols." During the 1980s, the economic bubble in Japan led to more anime being produced, as well as a rapid growth of idol singers debuting, which led the decade to become known as the "Golden Age of Idols." As television was influential for idols, anime became one of the mediums used to promote their careers. Creamy Mami, the Magic Angel was the first notable anime series to use a "media mix" marketing strategy to launch Takako Ōta's singing career, where she would provide the voice to the main character and portray her at music events. Idol singer Noriko Hidaka played the lead character, Minami Asakura, in Touch.

In the 1990s, public interest in idols declined, but slowly began regaining popularity near the early 2000s. In the 2000s, as more late-night anime was produced, voice actors such as Yukari Tamura, Nana Mizuki, Yui Horie, and Aya Hirano were promoted as idols by their record labels, leading them to be known as "idol voice actors." By this time, character songs performed by the actors were common, one example being Morning Musume member Koharu Kusumi providing the voice to lead character Kirari Tsukishima from Kirarin Revolution and releasing music under her name.

The growing number of idol groups active in the late 2000s and early 2010s led to an era that the media named the "Idol Warring Period." Due to the idol fan culture being connected to anime fan culture, around this time, media properties starring fictional idols also became popular, the earliest ones being The Idolmaster, Love Live!, and Uta no Prince-sama. Some may prefer fictional idols due to them never disbanding, leaving groups, or getting into scandals.

== List of idol anime and manga ==
Year	Title	Creator(s)	Original medium	Adaptation(s)	Tie-in artist	Ref(s)
2015	22/7	Aniplex, Sony Music Entertainment Japan, & Yasushi Akimoto	Music group	Anime television series, manga, video game	22/7	
2012	AKB0048	Satelight	Anime television series	Manga	AKB48	
2010	AKB49: Ren'ai Kinshi Jōrei	Reiji Miyajima	Manga	—N/a	AKB48	
2015	Ani Tore! EX	Rising Force	Anime television series	—N/a	—N/a	
2015	B-Project	Mages & Love&Art	Music group	Anime television series, manga, video game	KitaKore, MooNs, THRIVE, KiLLER KiNG	
2007	Bakumatsu Rock	Marvelous AQL	Video game	Anime television series	—N/a	
2019	Bermuda Triangle: Colorful Pastrale	Bushiroad, Michiko Yokote	Anime television series	—N/a	—N/a	—N/a
2001	Chance Pop Session	Madhouse	Anime television series	—N/a	—N/a	
2025	Colorful Stage! The Movie: A Miku Who Can't Sing	P.A. Works, Sega, Colorful Palette	Video game	Anime film	Deco*27, Giga, Iyowa, TeddyLoid, JIN, 40mP, sasakure.UK, Various	
2007	Crash!	Yuka Fujiwara	Manga	Audio drama, light novels, anime television series	—N/a	
1983	Creamy Mami, the Magic Angel	Pierrot	Anime television series	Manga, original video animation	Takako Ōta	
2022	CUE!	Yumeta Company, Graphinica	Video Game	Anime	Various	
2020	D4DJ	Bushiroad, Donuts	Music group	Anime television series, manga, video game	Various	—N/a
2015	Ensemble Stars!	Happy Elements	Video game	Stage plays, anime television series	Various	
1988	Fancy Lala	Studio Pierrot	OVA	Anime		
2020	Hatsune Miku: Colorful Stage!	Sega Sammy Holdings, Colorful Palette	Video Game	Anime film, mini anime series, yonkoma	Various	
2021	Hikaru in the Light!	Mai Matsuda	Manga	—N/a	—N/a	
2024	Himitsu no AiPri	Takara Tomy	Arcade Game	Television series, video game	Various	
2018	Hypnosis Mic: Division Rap Battle	King Records	Music group	Manga, anime television series	Various	
2015	I-Chu	Liber Entertainment	Video game	Anime television series	Various	
2022	Idol Bu Show	ORENDA and Amineworks	Multimedia project	Anime, live action	Various	
1989	Idol Densetsu Eriko	Ashi Productions	Anime television series	Manga	Eriko Tamura	
2013	Idol Dreams	Arina Tanemura	Manga	—N/a	—N/a	
2022	Idol × Idol Story!	Shōtarō Tokunō	Manga	—N/a	—N/a	
2017	Idol Time PriPara	Tatsunoko Productions & Takara Tomy	Arcade game	Anime television series, manga	Iris	
2017	Idol × Warrior Miracle Tunes!	Takara Tomy & OLM, Inc.	Live-action series	Manga, novels, video game	Miracle²	
2015	Idolish7	Bandai Namco Entertainment	Video game	Light novels, manga, anime television series, original video animation	IDOLiSH7, MEZZO", TRIGGER, Re:vale, ŹOOĻ	
2005	The Idolmaster	Bandai Namco Entertainment	Video game	Anime television series, anime film, manga	—N/a	
2011	The Idolmaster Cinderella Girls	Bandai Namco Entertainment	Video game	Anime television series, anime film, manga	Cinderella Project	
2013	The Idolmaster Million Live!	Bandai Namco Entertainment	Video game	Anime television series	—N/a	
2018	The Idolmaster Shiny Colors	Bandai Namco Entertainment	Video game	Radio show, Anime television series, anime film, manga	Various	
2014	The Idolmaster SideM	Bandai Namco Entertainment	Video game	Anime television series, manga, radio show	Various	
2019	Idoly Pride	CyberAgent	Anime television series	Video game, manga	—N/a	
2015	If My Favorite Pop Idol Made It to the Budokan, I Would Die	Auri Hirao	Manga	Anime television series	—N/a	
2024	Iris the Movie: Full Energy!!	Studio Gokumi	Music group		Iris	
2015	King of Prism by Pretty Rhythm	Tatsunoko Productions & Takara Tomy	Anime film	Manga, stage play	—N/a	
2016	King of Prism: Pride the Hero	Tatsunoko Productions & Takara Tomy	Anime film	Stage play	—N/a	
2019	King of Prism: Shiny Seven Stars	Tatsunoko Productions & Takara Tomy	Anime film	Stage play	—N/a	
2004	Kirarin Revolution	An Nakahara	Manga	Anime television series, video games, live-action shorts	Koharu Kusumi, Kira Pika, MilkyWay, Ships	
2018	Kiratto Pri Chan	Tatsunoko Productions & Takara Tomy	Arcade game	Anime television series	Iris, Run Girls, Run!	
2020	Lapis Re:Lights	KLab Games & Kadokawa Corporation	Anime	Video game, music, light novel, manga	Various	
2022	League of Nations Air Force Aviation Magic Band Luminous Witches	SHAFT	Anime	Anime, manga	Various	
2006	Lemon Angel Project	Avex	Anime	—N/a	—N/a	
2023	Link! Like! Love Live!	ASCII Media Works, Lantis, Bandai Namco Filmworks, & ODD No.	Video Game	Live streaming	Various	
2014	Locodol	Kōtarō Kosugi	Manga	Anime television series	—N/a	
2017	Love Kome: We Love Rice	Tochigi TV	Anime television series	Stage plays	—N/a	
2017	Love Live! Nijigasaki High School Idol Club	ASCII Media Works, Lantis, Sunrise & Bushiroad	Video Game	Manga, light novels, anime television series, anime film	Various	
2010	Love Live! School Idol Project	ASCII Media Works, Lantis, & Sunrise	Magazine Issue	Manga, light novels, anime television series, video game, anime film	μ's	
2015	Love Live! Sunshine!!	ASCII Media Works, Lantis, & Sunrise	Magazine Issue	Manga, light novels, anime television series, video game, anime film	Aqours, Saint Snow	
2020	Love Live! Superstar!!	ASCII Media Works, Lantis, & Bandai Namco Filmworks	Anime	Manga, video games	Liella!, Sunny Passion	
2001	Lovely Idol	Kohki Kanoh	Light novel	Video game, anime television series, original video animation	—N/a	
2025	Maebashi Witches	Sunrise	Television series			
2026	Magical Sisters LuluttoLilly	Studio Pierrot, Bandai Namco Filmworks	Anime			
2013	Marginal#4	Rejet & Idea Factory	Music group	Video game, anime television series	MARGINAL#4, LAGRANGE POINT, Unicorn, Jr.	
2013	Million Doll	Ai	Manga	Anime television series	—N/a	
2014	Ochikobore Fruit Tart	Sō Hamayumiba	Manga	Anime television series	—N/a	
2020	Oshi no Ko	Aka Akasaka and Mengo Yokoyari	Manga	Anime television series	—N/a	
2019	Paradox Live	Avex & GCREST	Music group	Anime television series	Various	
2022	Phantom of the Idol	Ichijinsha	Manga	Anime	myu	
2024	Polaris CoreTune	CyberAgent and Konami	Media project			
2010	Pretty Rhythm	Mari Asabuki	Arcade game	Manga	—N/a	
2014	Pretty Rhythm: All Star Selection	Tatsunoko Productions & Takara Tomy	Arcade game	Anime television series, manga, anime film	—N/a	
2011	Pretty Rhythm: Aurora Dream	Tatsunoko Productions & Takara Tomy	Arcade game	Anime television series, manga	Lisp, Prizmmy	
2012	Pretty Rhythm: Dear My Future	Tatsunoko Productions & Takara Tomy	Arcade game	Anime television series, manga	Prizmmy, Puretty	
2013	Pretty Rhythm: Rainbow Live	Tatsunoko Productions & Takara Tomy	Arcade game	Anime television series, manga	Prizmmy, Prism Box	
2014	PriPara	Tatsunoko Productions & Takara Tomy	Arcade game	Anime television series, manga	Iris	
2016	Sekkō Boys	Liden Films	Anime television series	—N/a	—N/a	
2021	Selection Project	Doga Kobo	Anime	Anime television series, manga	Hinaki Yano	
2022	Shine Post	Konami, Straight Edge, Buriki	Light novel project	Anime	Yasunori Nishiki	
2012	Shōnen Hollywood	Ikuyo Hashiguchi	Novel	Anime television series	—N/a	
2015	Star-Myu	ASCII Media Works	Anime television series	Manga, audio drama, stage plays, original video animation	—N/a	
2011	Symphogear	Akifumi Kaneko & Noriyasu Agematsu	Anime Original	Anime television series	—N/a	
2014	Tokyo 7th Sisters	Donuts Co. Ltd. & Victor Entertainment	Video game	Anime film	777☆SISTERS	
2012	Tsukiuta: The Animation	Movic	Music project	Anime television series, stage play	—N/a	
2021	UniteUp!	Sony Music Entertainment Japan, Cloverworks	Music Group	Anime television series, manga	PROTOSTAR, LEGIT, JAXX/JAXX, Anela	
2010	Uta no Prince-sama	Broccoli	Video game	Anime television series, stage plays, anime film	STARISH, Quartet Night, HEAVENS	
2015	Venus Project: Climax	Galat	Video game	Anime television series	—N/a	
2014	Wake Up, Girls!	Ordet	Anime film	Anime television series, original video animation	Wake Up, Girls!, Run Girls, Run!	
2021	WIXOSS Diva(A)Live	Hobby Japan, Shouta Yasooka, Tsuyoshi Tamai, Maiko Iuchi	TCG	Anime, Manga		
2018	Zombie Land Saga	MAPPA, Avex Pictures, & Cygames	Anime	Movie, manga	Yasuharu Takanashi, Funta7	
