= Local Hero (musical) =

2019 musical by Mark Knopfler, Bill Forsyth, and David Greig

- Official poster of the 2019 Lyceum production
- Music: Mark Knopfler
- Lyrics: Mark Knopfler
- Book: Bill Forsyth; David Greig
- Basis: 1983 film Local Hero
- Premiere: 23 March 2019: Royal Lyceum Theatre, Edinburgh
- Productions: 2019 Edinburgh; 2022 Chichester

Local Hero is a musical with music and lyrics by Mark Knopfler, and a book by Bill Forsyth and David Greig. The musical is based on the 1983 film of the same name, written by Bill Forsyth. It tells the story of an American oil company representative who is sent to the fictional village of Furness on the west coast of Scotland to purchase the town and surrounding property for his company. The musical made its world premiere at the Royal Lyceum Theatre in Edinburgh in March 2019.

== Background ==
The musical is based on the 1983 indie film Local Hero, written and directed by Bill Forsyth. The film was produced on a budget of just £3 million and won several awards including the 1984 BAFTA Award for Best Direction and the New York Film Critics Circle Award for Best Screenplay.

== Production history ==
=== World premiere: Edinburgh (2019) ===
Original cast of Local Hero

The play received its world premiere at the Royal Lyceum Theatre, Edinburgh in March 2019. A co-production with The Old Vic, the show has a book by the film's original screenwriter and director, Bill Forsyth, which has been adapted by Lyceum artistic director David Greig, with direction by John Crowley, movement direction by Lucy Hind, set and costume design by Scott Pask, lighting design by Paule Constable and video by Luke Halls. The musical features an original score and lyrics by Mark Knopfler, with sound design by Paul Arditti, musical supervision by Dave Milligan and music direction by Phil Bateman.

Local Hero began previews at the Royal Lyceum Theatre, Edinburgh on 14 March 2019, with an official opening night on 23 March, booking for a limited period until 20 April. Due to demand the world premiere run was extended until 4 May. Notable casting included Damian Humbley as Mac, Katrina Bryan as Stella, Matthew Pidgeon as Gordon, and Simon Rouse as Happer.

The production was due to transfer to The Old Vic, London where it was scheduled to begin previews 18 June 2020, with an official opening night on 1 July, booking for a limited period until 22 August. As a result of the coronavirus pandemic, however, The Old Vic announced in April 2020 that the production was being postponed, with no revised dates given at that time. The Old Vic have since announced that the production will not be going ahead due to the theatre's schedule. According the calls that ticket holders received to get their refunds, the Old Vic would like to have the production back in one or two years when the pandemic situation allow musicals at their stage.

=== Chichester (2022) ===
A new production opened in the Minerva Theatre, Chichester as part of the Festival 2022 with previews beginning 8 October, with a press night on 17 October, running until 19 November 2022. It was directed by the former Artistic Director Daniel Evans, set designed by Frankie Bradshaw with lighting design by Paule Constable with Ryan Day, Projection design by Ash J Woodward, sound design by Paul Arditti, musical direction by Richard John and orchestrated and arranged by Dave Milligan.

== Plot ==
Local Hero tells the story of an American oil company representative who is sent to the fictional village of Ferness on the west coast of Scotland to purchase the town and surrounding property to build a new refinery.

== Musical numbers ==
Edinburgh 2019

Act I

- "A Barrel Of Crude" - Company
- "Houston We Have A Problem" - Mac
- "We're Going To Make A Killing" - Company
- "What A Life" - Ben
- "Filthy Dirty Rich" - Gordon, Stella and Company
- "Rocks And Water" - Stella
- "That'd Do Me" - Company
- "I Hope You Haven't Changed On Me" - Stella and Gordon (Only performed during the preview shows)
- "Big Mac" - Iain, Viktor and Company
- "I Wonder If I Can Go Home Again" - Mistress Fraser and Company
- "Lone Star State" - Viktor

Act II

- "Never Felt Better" - Company
- "Cheerio Away You Go" - Ben and Stella
- "Get A Move On"- Company
- "Numbers"- Stella and Mac
- "All The Things That We Do" - Company Women
- "In An Ideal Word" - Mac and Gordon
- "Game Over" - Stella
- "I Wonder If I Can Go Home Again (reprise)" - Mac
- "Aiming For The Stars" - Ben and Company
- "Going Home"

Chichester 2022

Act I

- "A Barrel Of Oil" - Company
- "Houston We Have A Problem" - Mac
- "Welcome to Ferness" - The Band
- "We're Going To Make A Killing" - Company
- "What A Life" - Ben
- "Filthy Dirty Rich" - Gordon, Stella and Company
- "Rocks And Water" - Stella
- "That'd Do Me" - Company
- "Big Mac and Gordon" - Iain, Viktor and Company
- "I Wonder If I Can Go Home Again" - Mistress Fraser and Company

Act II

- "Never Felt Better" - Company
- "Cheerio Away You Go" - Ben and Stella
- "Filthy Dirty Rich - Reprise" - Company
- "Numbers"- Stella and Mac
- "In An Ideal Word" - Mac and Gordon
- "Rocks and Water - Reprise" - Stella
- "I Wonder If I Can Go Home Again (reprise)" - Mac
- "Going Home"

== Principal roles and cast ==
Character	Edinburgh	Chichester
Character	2019	2022
Ownie	Scott Ainslie	Ali Craig
Stella	Katrina Bryan	Lillie Flynn
Pauline/Punk Girl	Caroline Deyga	Julie Cullen
Ben	Julian Forsyth	Hilton McRae
Mac	Damian Humbley	Gabriel Ebert
Reverend Murdo	Emmanuel Kojo	Rodney Earl Clarke
Netta	Helen Logan	Liz Ewing
Malky/Lachie	Matthew Malthouse	Craig Hunter
Shona	Suzie McAdam	Betty Valencia
Rhona	Joanne McGuinness	Rachael Kendall Brown
Iain	John McLarnon	Murray Fraser
Viktor	Adam Pearce	Joshua Manning
Gordon	Matthew Pidgeon	Paul Higgins
Happer/Duncan	Simon Rouse	Jay Villiers
Mistress Fraser	Wendy Somerville	Jackie Morrison
