= Grace Cassidy =

English actress

- Born: Grace May Cassidy; 24 March 1993 (age 33); Salford, Greater Manchester, England
- Education: Goldsmiths, University of London; RADA
- Years active: 2005–present
- Family: Raffey Cassidy (sister)

Grace May Cassidy (born 24 March 1993) is an English actress. She began her career as a child actress in the BBC One drama The Chase (2006–2007), the CBBC series Grange Hill (2007–2008), and the ITV soap opera Emmerdale (2009–2012).

== Early life and education ==
Cassidy was born in Salford. She is the older sister of actress Raffey Cassidy, who portrayed Athena in Tomorrowland. Cassidy joined the National Youth Theatre. She graduated with a Bachelor of Arts in Drama and Theatre Arts from Goldsmiths, University of London in 2019. She then trained at the Royal Academy of Dramatic Art (RADA), graduating in 2021 with a Master of Arts in the Theatre Lab programme.

== Career ==
Cassidy's most notable role so far is that of Rachel Towers in BBC children's drama Grange Hill, but she has had a number of smaller roles in multiple television series of the past few years, including The Street, The Chase and Marian, Again. Cassidy also had a guest spot in Casualty 1909, spin-off of the drama series Casualty, appearing in this occasion alongside her real-life brother Mossie Cassidy in his first TV role.

Cassidy portrayed Matty Barton in Emmerdale prior to his transition when still going by "Hannah", with her first appearance in the soap being 17 July 2009. On 28 April 2012, Cassidy confirmed her departure from Emmerdale.

== Filmography ==
=== Film ===
Year	Title	Role	Notes
2016	The Lonely Italian	Café Patron	

=== Television ===
Year	Title	Role	Notes
2005	Marian, Again	Esme Bevan	2-part series
2006–2007	The Chase	Harriet Johnson / Deborah Johnson	10 episodes
2007–2008	Grange Hill	Rachel Towers	19 episodes
2007	The Street	Carmel Hanley	Episode: "Taxi"
2009	Casualty 1909	Teenage Girl	1 episode
2009–2012	Emmerdale	Hannah Barton	216 episodes
2012	Casualty	Jodie Ross	Episode: "The Blame Game"
2015	Father Brown	Simone Murray	Episode: "The Sign of the Broken Sword"
