= Katy Ashworth =

British television presenter and actress (born 1986)

- Born: 2 August 1986 (age 40); Frimley, Surrey, England
- Education: University of Exeter
- Occupations: Children's television presenter, actress, singer
- Years active: 2009–present
- Known for: CBeebies presenter
- Partner(s): Ben Alcott (2011–2016); Mark Cooper (2014–2020)
- Children: 2

Katy Ashworth (born 2 August 1986) is a British television presenter, actress and singer, known for presenting children's television programmes.

== Life ==
Ashworth was born on 2 August 1986 in Frimley, Surrey and grew up in Yateley, Hampshire. She obtained her first class degree in drama from the University of Exeter in 2009.

== Career ==
Ashworth began her television career presenting I Can Cook, the cookery programme for the under 6s, on the children's channel by the BBC, CBeebies. She has also been one of the regular continuity presenters for CBeebies since 2011, appearing on an ongoing basis, as one member of the CBeebies "house".

She has also appeared on other programmes on CBeebies, including Justin's House, as well as performing in various station promos. She has appeared in four of the CBeebies Christmas Pantomimes, as Aladdin in Aladdin, the palace cook in Strictly Cinderella, the Giant's Cook in Jack and the Beanstalk, and Mrs. Darling in Peter Pan, and in July 2014, featured in the first ever CBeebies Prom, at the Royal Albert Hall.

In addition to her television roles, she has appeared in many live stage shows. She toured the United Kingdom, with her one woman children's show, Katy's Roadshow, in 2011. She played forty venues across six months. She has also performed at many festivals and events around the world, including Glastonbury, LolliBop, the South African Good Food and Wine Show, and three CBeebies Live tours around the United Kingdom, including the show of April 2014, The BIG Band Easter Tour.

For three consecutive years, Ashworth has played Peter Pan in the end-of-year pantomimes around England, and in December 2014 played the role of the Fairy Godmother in Cinderella at the Anvil Theatre in Basingstoke. She played the role of the Forest Fairy in Jack and the Beanstalk at the Theatre Royal in Bath in December 2015.

Ashworth resigned from her presentation role at CBeebies in the beginning of 2016, and her final studio recording session was on 1 April 2016, but she subsequently returned in June 2017. She left CBeebies in November 2022.

== Philanthropy ==
Ashworth is the patron of Brainwave, which supports children with brain illnesses. She climbed Mount Kilimanjaro in Tanzania, in February 2012, in support of the charity. She is also an ambassador of Make-A-Wish Foundation, an organisation that grants wishes to children with life threatening conditions; and she supports the Bliss Foundation, which promotes care for premature babies.
