= Mister Maker =

British children's television series

- Genre: Children's television series
- Created by: Phil Gallagher
- Written by: Phil Gallagher; Nic Ayling; Driana Jones
- Directed by: James Morgan; Helen Scott; Peter Eyre; Jessie Brown
- Presented by: Phil Gallagher
- Music by: Andy Blythe and Marten Joustra
- Opening theme: "Make It, Mister Maker"
- Ending theme: "Make it, Mister Maker" (extended)
- Country of origin: United Kingdom
- Original language: English
- No. of series: 3 (MM); 2 (MMCT, MMAH); 1 (MMATW, MMAP)
- No. of episodes: 181

Production
- Executive producers: Phil Gallagher; Michael Carrington; Sarah Colclough; Vanessa Hill
- Producers: Series Producer: Driana Jones; Creative Consultant: Nic Ayling
- Production location: Maidstone
- Editors: Billy Sneddon; Ant Boys
- Running time: 19 mins 7 mins (Mister Maker At Home)
- Production companies: RDF Television (series 1); The Foundation (series 2 onwards)

Original release
- Network: CBeebies, BBC One, BBC Two
- Release: 17 September 2007 – 15 January 2021

Related
- Justin's House

Mister Maker is a British children's television series produced by RDF Media (series 1)/The Foundation (series 2–3) for CBeebies. The first series aired from 17 September 2007 until 12 April 2009.

The series was presented by Phil Gallagher in the title role. The series was followed by the four spin-offs: Mister Maker Comes to Town, Mister Maker Around the World, Mister Maker's Arty Party and Mister Maker at Home, which began airing in 2010, 2013, 2015 and 2020, respectively.

== Plot ==
Mister Maker, created and performed by Phil Gallagher, presents the show (Gallagher also created the series concept). Each episode features seven different sequences:

- Creative Idea – Mister Maker shows off a make involving several different arty materials particularly suitable for young children.
- The Shapes Dance (or "I Am A Shape") – The Shapes dance to their own song – "I Am A Shape" -, followed by one of them presenting a shape puzzle. At the end, the Shapes go to sleep.
- Make It in a Minute – Tocky the Bird (who, starting with season 2, is much less feathered) informs Mister Maker when this segment starts. When he does, Mister Maker makes a simple make in a minute, similar to the "1 Minute Finger Tips" segment (from fellow-Foundation production Finger Tips).
- The Colour Kids – Various children wearing different coloured clothes create a picture using different motions of their body.
- Frame-It! – A more relaxing segment put over a frame. This segment is narrated over by Mister Maker. This time, only the opening is seen, followed by the "Random Picture" segment below.
- Random Picture – A segment that has been seen after the "Frame-It!" opening. The segment is a video montage compiling only photos of either a messy picture or pictures made by objects (depending on each episode). Like the "Frame-It!" opening, this segment is narrated over by Mister Maker.
- Another Creative Idea – Mister Maker shows off another make in a very similar form to the first make.

At the end of each episode, Tocky pops out, saying "Time to go!" and reminds Mister Maker that it's time to go. Mister Maker says "That's it for now. My making time's over, but yours is just beginning!", and after that, he says "It's time to put all this stuff back in its box!", and the set quickly changes back into small objects in the progress.

== Development and broadcast ==
Mister Maker was commissioned by Michael Carrington at the BBC for CBeebies. The series was announced alongside Big Barn Farm in April 2007 under the name of Mister Make It.

The series launched in September 2007 and also aired on BBC One and BBC Two. It still currently airs on CBeebies, usually during weekdays. In Latin America the series was broadcast on the Discovery Kids and Discovery Familia networks, dubbed in Spanish and in Portuguese in Brazil. In Canada, the series aired on Treehouse TV from 2008 to 2012 and TVOKids from 2013 to 2021. The Foundation (part of RDF Media) commissioned the series for three seasons. The series comprises a mixture of animation, CGI and live-action.

== Episodes ==
=== Series 1 (2007) ===
No.	Broadcast	Makes
1	17 September 2007	Creative Idea – Junk Picture; The Shapes – Castle (Square); Make It in a Minute – Snake Pot; The Colour Kids – Rocket; Frame-It! – Tropical Island Picture; Messy Paint Picture – Bee; Another Creative Idea – Baked Beans on Toast
2	18 September 2007	Creative Idea – Stone Footprint Picture; The Shapes – House (Rectangle); Make It in a Minute – Torch Projector; The Colour Kids – Snail; Frame-It! – Fireworks Picture; Another Creative Idea – Ship in a Jar
3	19 September 2007	Creative Idea – Mini Twig Picture; The Shapes – Elephant (Square); Make It in a Minute – Alien Eyes; The Colour Kids – Island; Frame-It! – Treasure Map; Sweet Picture – Merry-Go-Round; Another Creative Idea – Train Pencil Pot
4	20 September 2007	Creative Idea – Spots and Stripes Picture; The Shapes – Rabbit (Square); Make It in a Minute – Pencil Pet; The Colour Kids – Windmill; Frame-It! – Photo Characters; Moving Pencil Picture – Boy on a Bike; Another Creative Idea – Pasta Robot
5	21 September 2007	Creative Idea – Seashell Picture; The Shapes – Underwater Diver (Circle); Make It in a Minute – Pop-Up Card; The Colour Kids – Can of Paint; Frame-It! – Wizard in the Night Sky; Nut Picture – Squirrel; Another Creative Idea – Bouncy Bat
6	24 September 2007	Creative Idea – Pressed Clay Picture; The Shapes – Zebra (Triangle); Make It in a Minute – Elephant Peg Holder; The Colour Kids – Crab; Frame-It! – Drawn Paint House Picture; Messy Paint Picture – Digger; Another Creative Idea – Bug-in-a-Box
7	25 September 2007	Creative Idea – Blow Picture; The Shapes – Chicken and Chick (Circle); Make It in a Minute – Bug-in-a-Jar; The Colour Kids – Fish; Frame-It! – Wool Doodle; Button Picture – Bus; Another Creative Idea – Crown
8	26 September 2007	Creative Idea – Cardboard Coin; The Shapes – Circus (Triangle); Make It in a Minute – Splat Monster Pen Pal; The Colour Kids – Butterfly; Frame-It! – Pasta Hair Picture; Footprint Picture – Dragon; Another Creative Idea – Floating Foam Boat
9	27 September 2007	Creative Idea – Wool Tree Picture; The Shapes – Balloon Scene (Circle); Make It in a Minute – Straw Pan Pipes; The Colour Kids – Duck; Frame-It! – Colour Diamond Pattern; Moving Pencil Picture – Footballer; Another Creative Idea – Crazy Cotton Bud Creature
10	28 September 2007	Creative Idea – Cobweb Marble Picture; The Shapes – Scarecrow (Rectangle); Make It in a Minute – Rubbish Picture; The Colour Kids – Boat; Frame-It! – Busy City Picture; Rubbers Picture – Kangaroo; Another Creative Idea – Tissue Paper Bird
11	1 October 2007	Creative Idea – Printing With Hands; The Shapes – Teddy Bear (Circle); Make It in a Minute – Cork Boat; The Colour Kids – Bat; Frame-It! – Space Picture; Random Picture – Swan and Baby; Another Creative Idea – Sandcastle
12	2 October 2007	Creative Idea – Gloopy Glue Patterns; The Shapes – Rocks & Pebbles (Rectangle); Make It in a Minute – A Mouse Finger Puppet; The Colour Kids – Birthday Cake; Frame-It! – Fishtank Picture; Another Creative Idea – Head with Grass Hairdo
13	3 October 2007	Creative Idea – Splat Picture; The Shapes – Woman Singing (Circle); Make It in a Minute – Pebble Dog; The Colour Kids – A Bowl of Ice Cream; Frame-It! – Sky & Rolling Hills Picture; Messy Paint Picture – Truck; Another Creative Idea – Lolly Stick House Picture
14	4 October 2007	Creative Idea – Snowflake Patterns; The Shapes – Peacock (Triangle); Make It in a Minute – Handy Pot; The Colour Kids – A Worm Eating an Apple; Frame-It! – Cuddly Toy Picture; Random Picture – Shells; Another Creative Idea – Giant Mister Ant
15	5 October 2007	Creative Idea – Springing Picture; The Shapes – Dinosaur (Square); Make It in a Minute – Pet Bug; The Colour Kids – A World; Frame-It! – Starfish Picture; Another Creative Idea – Crisp Tube Totem Pole
16	8 October 2007	Creative Idea – Torn Paper Road; The Shapes – Giraffe (Rectangle); Make It in a Minute – Butterfly; The Colour Kids – A Bowl of Ice Cream; Frame-It! – Octopus Picture; Random Picture – A Cat on a Moonlit Fence; Another Creative Idea – Space Age City
17	9 October 2007	Creative Idea – Splat Monsters; The Shapes – Eagle (Triangle); Make It in a Minute – Pom Pom Acrobat; The Colour Kids – Flower; Frame-It! – Owl Wallpaper Picture; Moving Pencil Picture – Tennis Player; Another Creative Idea – Paper Plate Dragon
18	10 October 2007	Creative Idea – Modelling Clay Picture; The Shapes – Guitar (Triangle); Make It in a Minute – Spoon Bug; The Colour Kids – A Train; Frame-It! – Dinosaur Picture; Another Creative Idea – Bottle Monster Skittle Game
19	11 October 2007	Creative Idea – Cardboard Cactus; The Shapes – Dog (Rectangle); Make It in a Minute – Piece of Art; The Colour Kids – A Clown; Frame-It! – Sheep Picture; Random Picture – Spider; Another Creative Idea – Alien
20	12 October 2007	Creative Idea – Masking Tape Patterns; The Shapes – Fox (Triangle); Make It in a Minute – Jellyfish; The Colour Kids – Submarine; Frame-It! – Invisible Farmyard Scene; Random Picture – City at Night; Another Creative Idea – Magnetic Worm Game

=== Series 2 (2008) ===
No.	Broadcast	Makes
21	3 February 2008	Creative Idea – Tennis Ball Picture; The Shapes – Camel (Triangle); Make It in a Minute – Hilarious Hairband; The Colour Kids – Caterpillar; Frame-It! – Seaside Picture; Peg Picture – Balloons; Another Creative Idea – String Spaghetti Dinner
22	4 February 2008	Creative Idea – Bubble Paint Picture; The Shapes – Horse (Rectangle); Make It in a Minute – Cake Case Rosette; The Colour Kids – Fire Engine; Frame-It! – Shiny Fish Picture; Car Picture – Ambulance; Another Creative Idea – Spaceman Skittle Game
23	5 February 2008	Creative Idea – Ancient Picture; The Shapes – Deer (Circle); Make It in a Minute – One Eyed Monster; The Colour Kids – Parrot; Frame-It! – Finger Paint Jungle Picture; Moving Pencil Picture – Ice Skater; Another Creative Idea – Shower Bottle Sign
24	6 February 2008	Creative Idea – Splattered Space Picture; The Shapes – Dinosaur (Square); Make It in a Minute – Coin Clackers; The Colour Kids – Pencil; Frame-It! – Bonfire Picture; Another Creative Idea – Worms in a Can
25	10 February 2008	Creative Idea – Surprising Picture; The Shapes – Saxophone (Circle); Make It in a Minute – Wobbly Clown; The Colour Kids – Lion; Frame-It! – Creepy Cauldron Picture; Messy Paint Picture – Snail; Another Creative Idea – Bubble Wrap Cactus
26	11 February 2008	Creative Idea – Egg Shell Picture; The Shapes – Wizard (Triangle); Make It in a Minute – Bookworm; The Colour Kids – Pizza; Frame-It! – Countryside Scene; Another Creative Idea – Creepy Castle
27	12 February 2008	Creative Idea – Torn Paper City Picture; The Shapes – Merry-Go-Round (Rectangle); Make It in a Minute – Fancy Dress Headdress; The Colour Kids – Dragon; Frame-It! – Ink Pattern Picture; Lolly Stick Picture – Grasshopper; Another Creative Idea – Shell Grotto
28	13 February 2008	Creative Idea – Leaf Printing Hedgehog; The Shapes – Bridge (Rectangle); Make It in a Minute – Springy Eye; The Colour Kids – Helicopter; Frame-It! – Robot Picture; Moving Pencil Picture – Skier; Another Creative Idea – Gruesome Jar
29	17 February 2008	Creative Idea – Paper Plate Picture; The Shapes – Parrot (Triangle); Make It in a Minute – Cotton Bud Sheep; The Colour Kids – Tractor; Frame-It! – Winter Picture; Footprint Picture – Owl; Another Creative Idea – Submarine Pencil Case
30	18 February 2008	Creative Idea – Drip Picture; The Shapes – Roller Coaster (Square); Make It in a Minute – Ear Card; The Colour Kids – Motorbike; Frame-It! – Ghostly Picture; Pom Pom Picture – Toadstool; Another Creative Idea – Bookend Secret Safe
31	19 February 2008	Creative Idea – Bubble Wrap Octopus Picture; The Shapes – Plane (Rectangle); Make It in a Minute – Straw Rocket; The Colour Kids – Ladybird; Frame-It! – Sunset Picture; Cotton Reel Picture – Rocking Horse; Another Creative Idea – Carnival Shaker
32	20 February 2008	Creative Idea – Tissue Paper Pattern; The Shapes – Hedgehog (Triangle); Make It in a Minute – Jazzy Pot; The Colour Kids – Octopus; Frame-It! – Astronaut in Space Picture; Messy Paint Picture – Frog; Another Creative Idea – Bowl of Fake Ice Cream
33	24 February 2008	Creative Idea – Torn Paper Pattern; The Shapes – Mouse (Circle); Make It in a Minute – Pencil Bug; The Colour Kids – Crown; Frame-It! – Rainbow Picture; Moving Pencil Picture – Cowboy; Another Creative Idea – Lighthouse
34	25 February 2008	Creative Idea – Cotton Bud Picture; The Shapes – Beach (Square); Make It in a Minute – Pine Cone Creature; The Colour Kids – Alien in a Spaceship; Frame-It! – Underwater Paint Picture; Liquorice Sweet Picture – Zebra; Another Creative Idea – Tin Foil Treasure
35	26 February 2008	Creative Idea – Sliding Eyes Picture; The Shapes – Robot (Rectangle); Make It in a Minute – Lolly Stick Lizard; The Colour Kids – Car; Frame-It! – Cake Picture; Footprint Picture – Flamingo; Another Creative Idea – Pirate Treasure Chest
36	27 February 2008	Creative Idea – Pop-Up Picture; The Shapes – Squirrel (Square); Make It in a Minute – Key Ring Charm; The Colour Kids – Kite; Frame-It! – Rubbed Out City at Night; Another Creative Idea – Mini Fish Tank
37	3 March 2008	Creative Idea – Sponge Building Picture; The Shapes – Tiger (Rectangle); Make It in a Minute – Springy Puppet; The Colour Kids – Ship; Frame-It! – Windy Picture; Bead Picture – Truck; Another Creative Idea – Glowing Firefly
38	4 March 2008	Creative Idea – Sticky Back Plastic Pattern; The Shapes – Shark (Triangle); Make It in a Minute – Jazzy Spinner; The Colour Kids – Roller Skate; Frame-It! – Lorry in the Rain; Another Creative Idea – Box Puppet
39	5 March 2008	Creative Idea – Stretchy Lorry; The Shapes – Frog (Triangle); Make It in a Minute – Paper Pet Fish Tank; The Colour Kids – Bucket & Spade; Frame-It! – Dinosaur Skeleton Picture; Another Creative Idea – Sticky Scouring Pad Picture
40	6 March 2008	Creative Idea – Scrunched Up Picture; The Shapes – Dog (Circle); Make It in a Minute – Surprise Spring Bug; The Colour Kids – Rainbow; Frame-It! – Snake Picture; Another Creative Idea – Monster Head Mask

=== Series 3 (2009) ===
No.	Broadcast	Makes
41	10 March 2009	Creative Idea – Spray Paint Picture; The Shapes – Farmyard (Triangle); Make It in a Minute – Cup Nose; The Colour Kids – Chameleon; Frame-It! – Hot Air Balloon Picture; Whistle Picture – Football; Another Creative Idea – Pencil Pencil Case
42	11 March 2009	Creative Idea – Cotton Wool Breakfast; The Shapes – Trainer (Rectangle); Make It in a Minute – Spoon Alien; The Colour Kids – Hummingbird; Frame-It! – Underwater Sea Picture; Another Creative Idea – Snappy Jungle Plant
43	12 March 2009	Creative Idea – Cereal Box Street; The Shapes – Pelican (Triangle); Make It in a Minute – Ugly Rock; The Colour Kids – Lifeboat; Frame-It! – Sawdust Picture; Jelly Sweet Picture – Cooked Breakfast; Another Creative Idea – Fake Cake
44	13 March 2009	Creative Idea – Full-Sized Pirate; The Shapes – Ring (Circle); Make It in a Minute – Flying Saucer; The Colour Kids – Country Cottage; Frame-It! – Dragon Picture; Another Creative Idea – Cardboard Castle Keeper
45	17 March 2009	Creative Idea – Wobbly Picture; The Shapes – Countryside (Square); Make It in a Minute – Sock Creature; The Colour Kids – Pen; Frame-It! – Watery Fish Picture; Footprint Picture – Dinosaur; Another Creative Idea – Fake Spilt Drink
46	18 March 2009	Creative Idea – Sand Tropical Picture; The Shapes – Rhinoceros (Triangle); Make It in a Minute – Badge Card; The Colour Kids – Bowl of Fruit; Frame-It! – Kite Picture; Another Creative Idea – Pretend Pizza
47	19 March 2009	Creative Idea – Funny Monster Face; The Shapes – Ice Cream (Circle); Make It in a Minute – Pipe Cleaner Mouse; The Colour Kids – Police Car; Frame-It! – African Sunset Picture; Moving Pencil Picture – Weightlifter; Another Creative Idea – Gloopy Splat Bug
48	20 March 2009	Creative Idea – Peeping Lid Picture; The Shapes – Submarine (Square); Make It in a Minute – Toothbrush Holder Whale; The Colour Kids – Watering Can; Frame-It! – Tin Foil Crown Picture; Another Creative Idea – Hilarious Spider
49	24 March 2009	Creative Idea – Prickly Spiky Paint Picture; The Shapes – Forklift Truck (Rectangle); Make It in a Minute – Spongy Card; The Colour Kids – Circus Tent; Frame-It! – Washing Line Picture; Another Creative Idea – Bowl Dinosaur
50	25 March 2009	Creative Idea – Triangle Stencil Pattern Picture; The Shapes – Horse & Carriage (Circle); Make It in a Minute – Glittery Box; The Colour Kids – Aeroplane; Frame-It! – Lighthouse Picture; Game Counter Picture – Unicorn; Another Creative Idea – Monster Rubber Glove Hand
51	26 March 2009	Creative Idea – Woolly Bird's Nest Picture; The Shapes – Train (Square); Make It in a Minute – Wobbly Bug; The Colour Kids – Cement Lorry; Frame-It! – Umbrella in a Rain Picture; Another Creative Idea – Yogurt Pot Puppy Puppet
52	27 March 2009	Creative Idea – Burst Through Picture; The Shapes – Watch (Circle); Make In in a Minute – Crazy Peg Bug; The Colour Kids – Crocodile; Frame-It! – Iceberg Picture; Another Creative Idea – Box Suitcase
53	31 March 2009	Creative Idea – Patchwork Pattern; The Shapes – Washing Line (Rectangle); Make It in a Minute – Pencil Bug; The Colour Kids – Cake; Frame-It! – Nighttime Picture; Another Creative Idea – Miniature Garden
54	4 April 2009	Creative Idea – Wrapping Paper Picture; The Shapes – Butterfly (Square); Make It in a Minute – Bugs on a Stick; The Colour Kids – Canal Boat; Frame-It! – Rubber Glove Seaside Picture; Another Creative Idea – Funky Colour Bird's Nest
55	5 April 2009	Creative Idea – Porthole Picture; The Shapes – Spider (Triangle); Make It in a Minute – Lolly Stick Bookmark; The Colour Kids – Snake; Frame-It! – Road Paint Picture; Jelly Sweet Picture – Jelly; Another Creative Idea – Body Shaped Photo Frame
56	8 April 2009	Creative Idea – Splatter Stencil Picture; The Shapes – Monkey (Circle); Make It in a Minute – Ice Cream Cone Game; The Colour Kids – Teddy Bear; Frame-It! – Layered Boat Picture; Another Creative Idea – Wobbly Egg
57	9 April 2009	Creative Idea – Parachute Mobile; The Shapes – Witch (Triangle); Make It in a Minute – Bubble Bag; The Colour Kids – Go Kart; Frame-It! – Tissue Paper Snail Picture; Another Creative Idea – Twinkling Twigs
58	10 April 2009	Creative Idea – Polystyrene Plate Picture; The Shapes – Crane (Rectangle); Make It in a Minute – Slot Plane; The Colour Kids – Lollypop; Frame-It! – Underwater Shark Picture; Game Piece Picture – Corn on the Cob; Another Creative Idea – Funny Face Magnet
59	11 April 2009	Creative Idea – Woolly Winding Picture; The Shapes – Cockerel/Rooster (Triangle); Make It is a Minute – Clacker Drum; The Colour Kids – Koala Bear; Frame-It! – Shiny Paper Paint Truck Picture; Messy Paint Picture – Squirrel; Another Creative Idea – Funny Face Gargoyle
60	12 April 2009	Creative Idea – Snipped Picture; The Shapes – Tent (Triangle); Make It is a Minute – Easy Tambourine; The Colour Kids – Iron; Frame-It! – Woolly Plane Picture; Pencil Sharpener Picture – Beatle; Another Creative Idea – Funny Crazy Bird Hoop Game

== Awards and nominations ==
- BAFTA: Nominated for Best Presenter (Phil Gallagher/Mister Maker)

== DVD ==
Various DVDs of the series were released by 2entertain, and later Abbey Home Media.

== Spin-offs ==
=== Comes to Town ===
Mister Maker Comes to Town is a spin-off commissioned by Michael Carrington at the BBC for CBeebies. The TV series launched in 2010 and ended in 2011.

At the start of every show, Mister Maker uses various objects to make a Makermobile. He shrinks himself, then the episode starts. Tocky, the cuckoo clock, gives Mister Maker a "mini maker message", a child who needs help from Mister Maker. The child tells Mister Maker what they would like to do or make something out of old things. This inspires him to do something related to them. He collects the essential items from the Doodle Drawers and makes them.

When Mister Maker can't find what he needs, he honks the horn, summoning Scrappz (a blue puppet with a scarf, a hat with straws and pipe cleaners on it, and googly eyes), who gives him what he wants. After they make it, a quartet of the shape mascots fly out and sing a silly song and dance, followed by a random shape (circle, triangle, square, or rectangle) to form a picture or find how many shapes there are.

Tocky then appears on the Makervideophone for Minute Make Time, and Mister Maker goes to a place where he can make something in a minute—usually completing it just before the timer stops. Then the Colour Kids ask Mister Maker from the videophone to guess what they would make with their colourful costumes.

It is followed by A Big Surprise, where Mister Maker sees some kids who were not expecting him. The kids tell Mister Maker what they would like to do. Mister Maker tells the kids what they will do, which will give him an idea of what to do next. In the middle of making it, he wonders why not make a (insert thing related to what the Mini Makers are making here). When the surprise is finished, they cheer and disappear from the scene, which comes to life.

The show ends with Tocky telling Mister Maker to go and then shows Mister Maker putting the Makermobile back in its box.

=== Around the World ===
Mister Maker Around the World (2013-2014) is a spin-off commissioned by Michael Carrington at the BBC for CBeebies that focuses on making things around the world. In this series, children sometimes help Mister Maker, the opposite of Mister Maker Comes to Town.

=== Arty Party ===
Mister Maker's Arty Party (2015) is a spin-off commissioned by Michael Carrington at the BBC for CBeebies. The episodes are:

1. The Sea
2. Purple
3. Drips and Drops
4. Insects
5. Buildings
6. Swirls
7. Animals
8. Dots and Spots
9. Blue
10. Squares
11. Doodles
12. Sparkly
13. Faces
14. Birds
15. Monsters
16. Jungle
17. Trees
18. Fish
19. Patterns
20. Rubbish and Recycling
21. Food
22. Gold
23. Transport
24. Countryside
25. Triangles
26. Circles

=== At Home ===
Mister Maker at Home (2020–2021) is a spin-off commissioned by Michael Carrington at the BBC for CBeebies. This spin-off was created during the COVID-19 pandemic.

=== Mumfie Makes ===
A YouTube spin-off titled Mister Maker's Mumfie Makes premiered on the show's official YouTube channel in April 2023. This spin-off was created as a tie-in with Zodiak Kids' reboot of Mumfie.

=== Live shows ===
- Mister Maker Live (2014–2015)
- Mister Maker and the Shapes Live (2014–2017)
- Mister Maker Returns (2018–2019)
- Mister Maker and Rebecca Keatley (2020–2021)
- Mister Maker Live at Alton Towers (May Half Term 2024)
- Mister Maker Farewell Tour (2026)
