= Vicky Myers =

English actress (born 1976)

- Born: Victoria Myers; 5 February 1976 (age 50); Stockport, Greater Manchester, England
- Occupation: Actress
- Years active: 1998–present
- Television: Coronation Street
- Children: 1

Victoria Myers (born 5 February 1976) is an English actress, known for her role as DS Lisa Connor-Swain on the ITV1 soap opera Coronation Street (2021–present). As well as her role on the soap, she appeared in various television series including The Five (2016), Age Before Beauty (2018), Ackley Bridge (2019) and The Long Shadow (2023).

== Early and personal life ==
Vicky Myers was born on 5 February 1976 in Stockport, Greater Manchester. She grew up as the daughter of publicans and after graduating from school, she began working in telesales. She also experienced working as a cleaner, a waitress and a barmaid. Aged 20, Myers got married and the pair later had a daughter together. Myers stated that she had always wanted to act, and whilst holding her daughter, she wanted to be able to tell her that she had made her dreams come true. She contacted an acting and modelling agency from a yellow pages book and got signed.

In 2010, Myers and her then-husband got divorced in what she described as a "quite down, bitter and vengeful" time for her. That same year, Myers took her nephew to the GP for a check-up since he suffers from a heart condition. The doctor noticed a mark on her calf; within five days, Myers was in hospital and was diagnosed with skin cancer. She took a break from acting for two years to work in a casting office. After treatment and reconstructive surgery, she returned to acting.

== Career ==
Myers' first role was as a nurse in the ITV1 soap opera Coronation Street in 1998. She acted alongside Denise Welch and Philip Middlemiss whilst filming Des Barnes' (Middlemiss) death scenes. She has said that to watch Welch act out grief was incredible and that "money can't buy that kind of experience". She appeared in two subsequent roles in Coronation Street, in 2007 and 2010. Then in 2016, she was cast in her breakthrough role, as Selena Callaway in The Five, a BBC miniseries. In 2018, she starred in the BBC drama series Age Before Beauty as Heidi Regan. To research the role of a beautician, she went to a salon for a lash lift and asked to sit and listen to the conversations.

In 2019, Myers appeared in the Channel 4 school drama series Ackley Bridge as Debbie Gartside, the mother of established character Kacey 'Spud' Gartside (Zara Salim). Then in 2021, she returned to Coronation Street in the recurring role of DS Lisa Connor-Swain, as well as making guest appearances in Unforgotten and Casualty. Two years later, she starred in The Long Shadow, an ITV true crime drama series.

In 2024, due to a positive reception to her character, Myers was promoted to a regular cast member on Coronation Street, with her character being given high-profile storylines, as well the soap writing in a daughter, Betsy Swain (Sydney Martin). For her role, she won "Best Soap Newcomer" at the 2024 I Talk Telly Awards, "Rising star" & "Best Couple" (with Alison King) at the 2024 Digital Spy Awards, "Celebrity Ally of the year" at the 2025 DIVA Awards, "Best Actress" & "Best Partnership" (with Alison King) at the 2025 Inside Soap Awards, "Best Soap Performance" & "Best Partnership" (with Alison King) at the 2025 I Talk Telly Awards. She was also nominated for "Best Partnership" (with Alison King) at the 2025 British Soap Awards.

== Filmography ==
| Year | Title | Role | Notes |
|---|---|---|---|
| 1998, 2007, 2010 | Coronation Street | Nurse / Paramedic / Driver | Guest roles |
| 2002 | Highrise | TV Game Show Contestant | Short film |
| 2003 | The Second Coming | Checkout Girl | 1 episode |
| 2010 | Lucy Lightfoot | Helen | Short film |
| 2016 | The Five | Selena Callaway | Main role |
| 2016 | Paranoid | Melanie | Recurring role |
| 2018 | Age Before Beauty | Heidi Regan | Main role |
| 2019 | Ackley Bridge | Debbie Gartside | Recurring role |
| 2020 | Pace | Christine | Film |
| 2021 | Unforgotten | Laura | 1 episode |
| 2021 | Casualty | Marie Kershaw | 1 episode |
| 2021–present | Coronation Street | DS Lisa Connor-Swain | Regular role |
| 2023 | The Long Shadow | WPC Sue Neave | Main role |
| 2023 | Platform 7 | PC Julie White | Recurring role |

== Awards and nominations ==
| Year | Award | Category | Result | Ref. |
|---|---|---|---|---|
| 2024 | I Talk Telly Awards | Best Soap Newcomer | Won | |
| 2024 | Digital Spy Awards | Rising Star | Won | |
| 2024 | Digital Spy Awards | Best Soap Couple (With Alison King) | Won | |
| 2025 | DIVA awards | Celebrity ally of the year | Won | |
| 2025 | British Soap Awards | Best Partnership (With Alison King) | Nominated | |
| 2025 | Inside Soap Awards | Best Actress | Won | |
| 2025 | Inside Soap Awards | Best Partnership (With Alison King) | Won | |
| 2025 | I Talk Telly Awards | Best Soap Performance | Won | |
| 2025 | I Talk Telly Awards | Best Partnership (With Alison King) | Won | |
| 2025 | Digital Spy Awards | Best Actor | Won | |
| 2025 | Digital Spy Awards | Best Couple (With Alison King) | Won | |
| 2025 | Digital Spy Awards | Best "OMG moment" for "Becky's return to ruin Swarla" | Won | |
| 2026 | Inside Soap Awards | Best Partnership (With Alison King) | Won | |
| 2026 | Inside Soap Awards | Best Actress | Won | |
