= Age Before Beauty =

2018 British television series

- Genre: Drama
- Created by: Debbie Horsfield
- Written by: Debbie Horsfield
- Directed by: Paul Norton Walker
- Starring: Polly Walker; Robson Green; James Murray; Kelly Harrison; Lisa Riley; Madeleine Mantock; Vicky Myers; Amir El-Masry; Sue Johnston
- Country of origin: United Kingdom
- Original language: English
- No. of series: 1
- No. of episodes: 6

Production
- Executive producers: Debbie Horsfield; Laura Mackie; Sally Haynes; Elizabeth Kilgarriff
- Producer: Guy De Glanville
- Production location: Manchester
- Production company: Mainstreet Pictures

Original release
- Network: BBC One
- Release: 31 July – 29 August 2018

Age Before Beauty is a BBC television drama series by Debbie Horsfield that premiered on BBC One on 31 July 2018. The six-part series is based in Manchester, England, and stars Robson Green, Sue Johnston, Polly Walker and James Murray.

== Plot ==
Age Before Beauty is a family drama set in a Manchester beauty salon. The series follows Bel, a homemaker and mother-of-two, as she deals with the demands of her family's struggling salon business and her warring family with the problems in her marriage.

== Cast and characters ==
- Robson Green as Teddy Roxton, Bel's brother-in-law and best friend.
- Sue Johnston as Ivy-Rae Regan, Bel's mother and a spray tan technician in the family's salon.
- Polly Walker as Bel Finch, a homemaker and mother who takes over her family's salon business.
- James Murray as Wesley Finch, Bel's husband of 25 years.
- Lisa Riley as Tina Regan, Bel's sister and a tattoo artist in the family's salon.
- Kelly Harrison as Leanne Roxton, Bel's obnoxious sister and a nail technician and personal stylist in the family's salon.
- Vicky Myers as Heidi Regan, Bel's sister, a cosmetic surgery addict and mother to seven-year-old Disney, a wannabe pageant queen.
- Madeleine Mantock as Lorelei Bailey, a personal trainer in her twenties.

== Episodes ==
No.	Title	Directed by	Written by	Original release date	U.K. viewers (millions)
1	"Episode 1"	Paul Norton Walker	Debbie Horsfield	31 July 2018	4.57 million
2	"Episode 2"	Paul Norton Walker	Debbie Horsfield	7 August 2018	3.84 million
3	"Episode 3"	Paul Norton Walker	Lee Warburton	14 August 2018	3.68 million
4	"Episode 4"	Paul Norton Walker	Debbie Horsfield	21 August 2018	3.67 million
5	"Episode 5"	Paul Norton Walker	Debbie Horsfield	28 August 2018	3.74 million
6	"Episode 6"	Paul Norton Walker	Debbie Horsfield	29 August 2018	3.82 million

== Production ==
Filming for the series began in June 2017 in the Northern Quarter, Manchester.
