= Kelly Harrison =

British actress (born 1980)

Kelly Harrison (born November 28, 1980) is a British actress. Initially a model for four years, she was cast in BBC's Saturday night programme, Casualty, as paramedic Nikki Marshall. Harrison has also appeared in Born and Bred, Waking the Dead, Dalziel and Pascoe, Paddington Green, Where the Heart Is, and in ITV's drama Marian, Again, in which Harrison had the title role. Harrison then appeared in the BBC drama Age Before Beauty.

== Filmography ==
=== Film ===
Year	Film	Role	Notes
2001	Dream	Emma	
2005	Marian, Again	Marian Walsh	TV movie
2007	Spring 1941	Young Emilia	
2008	Mother, Mine	Alison	Short film
2009	Upstairs	Grace Stearn	
2010	Capture Anthologies: Fables & Fairytales	Alison	Direct-to-video
2010	You Will Meet a Tall Dark Stranger	Personal Trainer	
2012	Broken Hearts	Grandmother Thompson	
2015	Augustina	Nat	Short film
2017	Moose Limbs	Sue	Short film

=== Television ===
Year	Series	Role	Notes
1997	Dalziel and Pascoe	Sexy Waitress	Episode: "Exit Lanes"
2001-2004	Casualty	Nikki Marshall	Main cast (Series 16–18)
2004	Where the Heart Is	Isabel Noakes	Episode: "The Games We Play"
2005	The Last Detective	Private Karla Moore	Episode: "Towpaths of Glory"
2005	Born and Bred	Nancy Brisley	Main cast (Series 4)
2005	Waking the Dead	Tina	Episode: "Subterraneans: Part 1"
2006	The Street	Girl at Party	Episode: "Football"
2006	Goldplated	Cassidy	Main cast
2007	Nina and the Neurons	Belle the Sound Neuron	Main cast (voice role)
2008	Nina and the Neurons Go Eco!	Neuron Belle	Main cast (voice role)
2009	The Bill	Fran Morris	2 episodes
2009	Nina and the Neurons Go Inventing	Belle	Main cast (voice role)
2010	A Passionate Woman	Moira	Miniseries, main cast
2010	Nina and the Neurons In the Lab	Belle	Main cast (voice role)
2010	Identity	Gail Robertson	Episode: "Chelsea Girl"
2011	Silent Witness	D.C. Julia Catina	Episode: "A Guilty Mind"
2011	Nina and the Neurons Brilliant Bodies	Belle	Main cast (voice role)
2011	The Body Farm	Susan Ryan	1 episode
2013	Nina and the Neurons Go Engineering	Belle	Main cast (voice role)
2013	Nina and the Neurons: Earth Explorers	Belle the Sound Neuron	Main cast (voice role)
2014	Nina and the Neurons Get Sporty	Belle	Main cast (voice role)
2014	Nina and the Neurons Go Digital	Belle	Main cast (voice role)
2014, 2023	Happy Valley	Ros Cawood	Recurring role (Series 1), guest (1 episode, Series 3)
2015	Safe House	Susan Reynolds	Recurring role (Series 1)
2015	Doctors	Maria Wiseman	Episode: "Ghost"
2015	Nina and the Neurons Get Building	Belle	Main cast (voice role)
2016	The Level	Delia Bradley	Recurring role
2017	The End of the F***ing World	Vanessa	2 episodes
2018	Age Before Beauty	Leanne	Main cast
2018	The Athena	Katherine	Supporting cast
2018–2019	Coronation Street	Elsa Tilsley	Recurring role
2019	Father Brown	Cathy Fawlter	Episode: "The Skylark Scandal"
2024	Doctors	Janet Balcombe	Episode: "Isolation"
