= I Can Cook =

British children's television series

- Genre: Children's television series Cooking show
- Created by: Katy Ashworth
- Written by: Nic Ayling; Driana Jones
- Directed by: Helen Scott
- Presented by: Katy Ashworth
- Theme music composer: Andy Blythe and Marten Joustra
- Opening theme: "I Can Cook"
- Ending theme: "I Can Cook" (Reprise)
- Composer: Andy Blythe and Marten Joustra
- Country of origin: United Kingdom
- Original language: English
- No. of series: 4
- No. of episodes: 104

Production
- Executive producers: Christopher Pilkington; Katy Ashworth
- Producers: Driana Jones (Series 1); Andrew Garland (Series 2 & 3)
- Production locations: Maidstone (Series 1 & 2)
- Running time: 14 minutes
- Production company: Initial

Original release
- Network: CBeebies
- Release: 5 October 2009 – 14 December 2012

I Can Cook is a British children's television series, that was broadcast on CBeebies, from 5 October 2009 to 14 December 2012. It was presented by Katy Ashworth, who demonstrates how to prepare and cook simple dishes, while entertaining with songs. Each show focuses on the creation of one dish, either savoury or sweet.

As the programme is aimed at children, the dishes are simple to prepare. Some dishes, such as the grape pizza, offer alternatives to traditional dishes.

As well as encouraging children to cook, the show encompasses wider elements of food education; it uses cutaway scenes to show Ashworth in outside locations, explaining the process of cultivating, and growing any key ingredient in the show's dish.

== I Can Cook With You ==
During 2011, the series was branded I Can Cook With You, and featured Katy travelling around the United Kingdom in her own van, to cook in various outdoor locations, and visiting farms and other locations, where food is produced.

== I Can Cook on the Go ==
In 2012, the series was branded I Can Cook on the Go, and features a new revamped van called Horace, and “pinchy parrot”, and wooden spoon puppets. The Special Ingredient, however, it was not included in this season.
