= Katrina Bryan =

British actress

- Born: 10 July 1980 (age 45); Gatehouse of Fleet, Kirkcudbrightshire, Scotland
- Occupations: Actress; presenter
- Years active: 1999–present
- Partner(s): Richard McCourt (2015–present); engaged
- Children: 1

Katrina Bryan (born 10 July 1980) is a Scottish actress who has starred in Taggart, Nina and the Neurons, and Molly and Mack. She has been active since 1999. Bryan has a BA in Acting from Edinburgh's Queen Margaret University School of Drama. She appeared in an Irn-Bru advert where she names her newborn baby Fanny, much to the shock of the baby's father.

== Personal life ==
In 2015, she started dating her long-term partner Richard McCourt; they live in Wilmslow together. In 2019, Bryan confirmed their engagement via her Instagram page.

== Television and film credits ==
- ITV Emmerdale – TV – (2020) – Eloise
- CBeebies Swashbuckle – TV – (2019) Arrlice
- CBeebies Molly and Mack – TV – (2018–2022) – Alice
- CBeebies Christmas Show:Thumbelina – TV – (2018) – Thumbelina
- CBeebies presents The Nutcracker'' – TV – (2016) – Sugarplum Fairy
- CBeebies Panto:Alice in Wonderland – (2015) – TV – Alice's Mum
- Fried - TV - (2015) - Margot
- CBeebies Panto:Peter Pan – TV – (2014)- TV – Wendy Darling
- CBeebies Swashbuckle – (2014) – TV – Nina
- A CBeebies Christmas Carol – TV – (2013) – Friend of Christmas Present
- CBeebies Panto:Jack and the Beanstalk – TV – (2012) – Princess Nina
- CBeebies Panto:Strictly Cinderella – TV – (2011) – Cinderella
- CBeebies Panto:Aladdin – TV – (2010) – So-Shi
- CBeebies Panto:Jack and Jill – (2009) – Nina
- Asylum – Short Film – (2011) – Director Jorn Utkilen – Teacher
- CBeebies Justin's House – TV – (2011–2012) – Nina
- Rab C Nesbitt – Series 9, episode 1 'Heal' – TV – (2010) – Dr. Lennox
- Wind Over Lake – Film – (2010) – Imagine Pictures – Katrina
- Taggart – TV – (2007–2010) – Ellis Sinclair
- CBeebies Nina and the Neurons – TV – (2007–2015) – Nina
- Night People – (BAFTA Award Winning Film) – (2005) – Jane
- Size 5 -Short Film – (2005) – Imagine Pictures – Shop Assistant
- Paper Anniversary – Short Film – (2004) – Imagine Pictures – Waitress
- See you, See me – TV – (2004) – Tess Macalli
- Sea of Souls – TV – (2004) – Radio Presenter
- Ancient Greece – TV – (BBC Education) – (2004) – Persephone & Chorus
- The Toon Fair – (2001) – Special Guest
- Who's My Favourite Girl ? – Short Film – (1999) – May

== Theatre credits ==
- Local Hero – (March–May 2019) – Royal Lyceum Theatre, Edinburgh – Stella
- Beauty and the Beast – (Dec 2014/Jan 2015) – Gaiety Theatre, Ayr – Beauty
- Sleeping Beauty – (November 2012 – January 2013) – Evolution Productions – The Marlowe Theatre, Canterbury – The Good Fairy
- Beauty and the Beast – (December 2011) – Mad About Productions – DG One – Dumfries and Galloway – Beauty
- My Romantic History- (2011) – Borderline Theatre Company – Director Jemima Levick – Sasha
- Jack & The Beanstalk – (Dec 2009/Jan 2010) – Eden Court Theatre, Inverness – The Flower Fairy
- Mother Bruce – (Dec 2008/Jan 2009) – Tron Theatre, Glasgow – Samolina Salamander
- Eeting Beauty – (Dec 2007/Jan 2008) – Tron Theatre, Glasgow – Princess Bess
- Dick McWittington – (Nov-Dec 2006) – Brunton Theatre, Musselburgh – Alice Fitzwarren
- Hambledog and His Hopping Clogs – (2005) – Perissology Theatre Company – Granny Hobble
- A Virgins Guide To Rocky Horror – (2005) – Daemonmedia Scotland – Janet
- Jack & The Beanstalk – (Nov-Dec 2004) – Brunton Theatre, Musselburgh – Jill
- Death Of A Salesman – (2004) Royal Lyceum Theatre, Edinburgh – Letta & Jenny
- The Chrysalids – (2003) – Complete Productions – Anne
- Greggs – The Musical – Gilded Balloon – (2003) – Gilded Balloon Productions – Fiona
- Houghmagandie Pack – (2003) – Grid Iron – Jean Armour
- Sleeping Beauty – (Dec 2002/Jan 2003) – Eden Court Theatre, Inverness – Princess Beauty
- Parking Lot In Pittsburg – (2002)- Byre Theatre, St Andrews – Nurse & (Acting ASM)
- A Midsummer Night's Dream – (2002) – Brunton Theatre, Musselburgh – Helena
- Sleeping Beauty – (Nov 2001/Jan 2002) – Brunton Theatre, Musselburgh – Princess Luminessa
- If I Die B 4 U Wake – (2001) – Theatre Workshop – Shonagh

== Radio credits ==
- Newsmash – Comedy Unit/BBC Scotland – (2009) – Sally Moore (News Anchor)
- Death and the Penguin – BBC Radio 3 – (2006) – Nina
