= Marian, Again =

2005 television film

- Danish DVD cover
- Genre: Thriller
- Written by: Ben Court; Caroline Ip
- Directed by: David Drury
- Starring: Stephen Tompkinson; Kelly Harrison; Owen Teale; Samantha Beckinsale; Paul Copley; Katie Ross; Grace Cassidy; Amy Lythgoe
- Composer: Alan Parker
- Country of origin: United Kingdom
- Original language: English
- No. of series: 1
- No. of episodes: 2

Production
- Executive producers: Steve Christian; George Faber; Tom Grieves; Charles Pattinson
- Producer: Steve Lightfoot
- Cinematography: Mark Waters
- Editor: Ian Farr
- Running time: 90 minutes
- Production companies: Company Pictures; Isle of Man Films

Original release
- Network: ITV
- Release: 5 September – 6 September 2005

Marian, Again is a two-part British psychological thriller serial, written by Ben Court and Caroline Ip and directed by David Drury, that broadcast across two consecutive nights on ITV from 5 September 2005. Filmed in and around Manchester and on Ballaugh and Douglas on the Isle of Man during May and June 2005, the serial is based upon the real-life kidnapping of Colleen Stan in the United States.

Also taking inspiration from the cases of Marc Dutroux and Natascha Kampusch, Marian, Again follows married father of three Chris Bevan (Stephen Tompkinson), who whilst taking his daughter to school exam, seemingly catches sight of his first girlfriend, Marian Walsh (Kelly Harrison), who mysteriously disappeared fifteen years ago and has not been seen or heard from since.

Marian, Again broadcast over two consecutive nights, with parts one and two attracting 6.76 million and 5.95 million viewers respectively. The serial was released on DVD in Denmark on 13 September 2006, but this remains the only official release worldwide.

== Plot ==
Chris Bevan (Stephen Tompkinson) encounters his first love, Marian Walsh (Kelly Harrison), fifteen years after her abrupt disappearance. Although he had accepted her loss and moved on, he—now a married father of three daughters—is intrigued, confused, and eager to know why she suddenly left. What he doesn't know is that she was abducted by Bernie (Owen Teale), a creepy regular at her father's D.I.Y. store. After years of physical and mental torture at Bernie's hands, Marian is a shadow of her former self and has been convinced by Bernie that she's someone named Susie. Chris must now fight to save the woman he loved, but it's more difficult than he had anticipated.

== Cast ==
- Stephen Tompkinson as Chris Bevan
- Kelly Harrison as Marian Walsh
- Owen Teale as Bernie Sullivan
- Samantha Beckinsale as Josie Bevan
- Paul Copley as Philip Walsh
- Katie Ross as Olivia Bevan
- Grace Cassidy as Esme Bevan
- Amy Lythgoe as Tilly Bevan
- Jack Harrison-Cooper as Brandon Brison
- Stuart McQuarrie as Jim
- Natalie Richards as Frances
- Junaid Iqbal-Wahid as Sonny
- Shahed Ali as Suraj
- Sian Gibson as Fiona
- Patrick Connolly as PC Quinn
- Peter Slater as PC Sanders
