= Phil Gallagher =

British presenter

Phillip Gallagher is a British children's television presenter who is best known for playing the title character in the CBeebies children's television show Mister Maker.

== Early life ==
Gallagher attended Rainham Mark Grammar School in Rainham, Kent, and Canterbury Christ Church University.

== Career ==
Gallagher started his career as presenter and sports reporter on BBC Radio Kent. He was a performer and puppeteer on Playhouse Disney and also provided characters and voices for Studio Disney.

From 2003 until 2005, Gallagher presented Diggin' It on GMTV. During 2006, he was a regular character on Mighty Truck of Stuff as 'Pablo', and was also the voice-over for Channel 4's Unanimous.

Gallagher appeared as the title character in Mister Maker from 2007 - 2026, across four tv shows and eight seasons. The show was adapted into a successful touring franchise, conducting tours globally since 2014. In 2026, Gallagher announced a Farewell Tour in the UK and that he would be retiring the character after 20 years.

He also appeared in 2 episodes of Bear Behaving Badly as the Robot Rat Catcher and the Mummy. Since 2009, he has also played the role of 'Mr Liker Biker' in Grandpa in My Pocket.

Gallagher often performs in pantomimes. In 2006, he appeared as Wishee Washee in Aladdin at the Theatre Royal in Winchester. In 2007, he appeared as Silly Billy (Jack's brother) in Jack and the Beanstalk, again at the Theatre Royal in Winchester. In 2008, he appeared as Buttons in Cinderella at the Opera House, Buxton, Derbyshire. In 2009 he played alongside George Takei in the title role of Aladdin at the Central Theatre in Chatham, Kent, and in 2011 as Muddles in Snow White and the Seven Dwarfs in St Albans with Toyah Willcox who played the Evil Queen. In 2013, he returned to Jack and the Beanstalk, playing Billy Trot in a production at the Marlowe Theatre, Canterbury alongside Samantha Womack.

In 2009, Gallagher was nominated for the BAFTA Children's Awards as Best Presenter for his role in Mister Maker.

In 2021, a rumour arose on TikTok indicating that 'Mister Maker' (the character he played in the children's television show of the same name) had died. The initial confusion came from fans mixing up Phil Gallagher with another presenter called Mark Speight who hosted SMart. Gallagher has a TikTok account named "mistermakerofficial".

== Filmography ==
Years	Programme	Role
2007–2009	Mister Maker	Mister Maker
2007–2010	Bear Behaving Badly	Robot Rat Catcher, Mummy
2008	Hotel Trubble	Dr Windy Banana Bones
2009–2011	Grandpa in My Pocket	Mr Liker Biker
2009	CBeebies Jack & Jill	Mister Maker
2010-2011	Mister Maker Comes to Town	Mister Maker
2010	CBeebies Aladdin	Wishy Washy
2010	Jollywobbles	Regular
2011	CBeebies Panto: Stricly Cinderella	Makerina
2012	CBeebies Panto: Jack And The Beanstalk	Mister Maker
2013	A CBeebies Christmas Carol	Mister Maker / Art Teacher
2013	Mister Maker Around the World	Mister Maker
2014	CBeebies Panto: Peter Pan	Lost Boy
2015	CBeebies Panto: Alice in Wonderland	Cheshire Cat
2015	Mister Maker's Arty Party	Mister Maker
2016	Snow White and the Seven Dwarfs	Muddles
2018	CBeebies Panto: Thumbelina	Barney Toad
2019	CBeebies Panto: Hansel and Gretel	Daddy Crimble
2020–2021	Mister Maker at Home	Mister Maker

== Tours ==
Since 2014, Gallagher undertook the following tours globally as Mister Maker following the successful adaptation of the TV show into touring format and subsequent franchise.

- Mister Maker Live (2014–2015)
- Mister Maker and the Shapes Live (2014–2017)
- Mister Maker Returns (2018–2019)
- Mister Maker and Rebecca Keatley (2020–2021)
- Mister Maker Live at Alton Towers (May Half Term 2024)
- Mister Maker Farewell Tour (2026)
