= Nina and the Neurons =

British television series

- Genre: Children's
- Presented by: Katrina Bryan (as "Nina")
- Starring: James Dreyfus (s1); Lewis MacLeod; Kelly Harrison; Patrice Naiambana; Siobhan Redmond; Sharon Small
- Countries of origin: United Kingdom (Scotland)
- Original language: English
- No. of series: 11
- No. of episodes: 225

Production
- Running time: 15 minutes

Original release
- Network: CBeebies
- Release: 26 February 2007 – 2 October 2015

Nina and the Neurons is a British live action/animated television programme shown on the CBeebies channel, aimed at young children to help them understand basic science. Nina is a neuroscientist who enlists the help of five Neurons (animated characters representing the senses) in her brain to answer a scientific question. It was first aired on 26 February 2007 and ended on 2 October 2015.

The show was produced by Lucille McLaughlin, who has also produced the children's programmes like Balamory, Me Too! and Bits and Bobs. The series is commissioned by CBeebies Controller, Michael Carrington.

== Synopsis ==
Most of the show was based at Glasgow Science Centre, with a little part taking place outdoors. During the show's earlier series, at the beginning of each episode, Nina conducted experiments in front of an unseen audience of children. At one point of the show, Nina is 'contacted' by (usually two or three, but rarely four) children, who appear on a computer screen asking a science-related question (e.g., 'What makes rainbows appear and disappear?') Nina then chooses one (or more) of the five Neurons inside her brain based upon which of the senses is most appropriate to answer the question. Once the Neuron has been selected by Nina, the children (called the 'experimenters') then visit her, using fun experiments and games.

Afterwards, Nina takes the children out to find out more about the answer to the question, sometimes with the help of their friends and family. After they have found out the answer to the question, they travel back to the Glasgow Science Centre to do another experiment and then the experimenters leave.

At the end of each show, a song is sung, which changes from series to series depending on the theme of the series. Then, the Neurons discuss what they have done and the individual role they have played. The show ends with Nina and the Neurons bidding farewell to the viewers.

== Characters and cast ==
- Nina (played by Katrina Bryan), the main character of the series. She is a scientist who works in a laboratory in the Glasgow Science Centre and is always happy to help children solve their scientific problems. She wears a white lab coat with brightly coloured cuffs and lapels in her lab and either a bright yellow coat or a blue jacket when outside. Her mode of transport is either a pale blue 1970s Volkswagen Type 2 (Transporter) minibus in Series 1, or a New MINI in all other seasons, both bearing numberplates reading 'N1NA'. In "Go Eco!", she rides a bicycle to fit the environmental theme.

=== Neurons ===
The Neurons are five animated human characters (stylised with human facial features and body, but no legs) who live together inside Nina's brain and are named to reflect the five senses which they represent:

- Felix (Voiced by James Dreyfus in the first series and Lewis MacLeod in the rest), the oldest of the Neurons who is particular about his appearance and speaks in a posh accent. He is coloured green, and represents touch and feel.
- Belle (Voiced by Kelly Harrison), the second-in-command of the Neurons who can be quite loud and bossy but is still friendly and nice. She speaks in a Northern accent, coloured red with a pink face, and represents hearing and sound.
- Luke (Voiced by Patrice Naiambana), the group leader of the Neurons with a laid-back/relaxed personality and speaks in a Jamaican accent. He is coloured yellow, and represents sight and looking.
- Ollie (Voiced by Siobhan Redmond), a Neuron referred to as being 'sweet, self-assured and a bit of a goth.' She speaks in a Scottish accent, is coloured purple and violet, and represents smell and scent.
- Bud (Voiced by Sharon Small), the youngest of the Neurons and Ollie's younger brother. Being young, can be quite enthusiastic and easily excited within the world around him. As with Ollie, Bud also speaks with a Scottish accent. He is coloured blue and represents taste and eating.

== Awards and nominations ==
- BAFTA Scotland 2007

- Awarded Best Children's Programme

- BAFTA Scotland 2008

- Nominated as Best Children's Programme

Composer: Scottish Composer Graham Ness

== Exhibits ==
There is a themed Nina & the Neurons activity trail at the Glasgow Science Centre.. There was also an attraction located at Alton Towers themed to the show called Nina's Science Lab which opened in 2014 and closed in 2018.

== Episodes ==
The series has seen many different changes through its nine-year run, with a majority of seasons focusing on specific themes of science or technology.

=== Series 1 (2007) ===
The first series premiered on 26 February 2007, functioning as one of the many new additions to the rebranded CBeebies channel, and ran until 30 March 2007. Episodes centre on Nina visiting a family shadowing shows like Supernanny, whose kids are in need of the answer to a scientific problem. They become "Experimenters" for the day, adorning light blue T-shirts and solve the question with the help of the Neurons.

(The titles for Series 1 and 2 are from Digiguide)

1. Stars: Luke
2. Do We All Smell Different?: Ollie
3. Amazing Maze: All Neurons
4. Trumpet: Belle
5. Snowballs: Felix
6. Eyebrows: Luke
7. What's Cooking?: All Neurons
8. All Bunged Up: Ollie And Bud
9. Nina Needs A Wee: Felix
10. Spy kit: Belle
11. Granny's Glasses: Luke
12. Where's The Bad Smell?: Ollie
13. Wakey Wakey: Belle
14. Why Is My Tongue Wet?: Bud
15. Shadows: Luke
16. Birthday Surprise: Felix
17. Different Tastes: Bud
18. Monster Hunt: All Neurons
19. Making Music: Belle
20. Distance: Luke
21. Staying Cool: Felix
22. Too Much Salt: Bud
23. Bud Needs Help: Bud
24. Echoes: Belle
25. Colours: Luke

=== Series 2 (2008) ===
The second series aired on CBeebies from 31 March-2 May 2008. This series retained the format of Series 1 but focused more on topics about physics and human functionalities. There were more kid-only episodes than in Series 1, and would continue on for the rest of the show.

1. Hide And Seek: Luke
2. Getting Goosebumps: Felix
3. Nina's Cake Bake: All Neurons
4. I Can See A Rainbow: Luke
5. Terrific Teeth: Bud
6. Touching The Clouds: Felix
7. Smelly Feet: Ollie
8. In A Spin: Belle
9. Bubble Trouble: Luke
10. Fun in the Sun: Felix
11. Tummy Rumbles: All Neurons
12. Finding Flowers: Luke And Ollie
13. Lovely Lollies: Bud
14. Brilliant Bones: Felix
15. Rumbling Thunder: Belle
16. Nina Gets Nosey: Ollie
17. What A Fright: Felix
18. Let's Hear It For Ears: Belle
19. Making Waves: Luke
20. Splish Splash: Felix
21. Baby Talk: Bud
22. Funny Honey: All Neurons
23. Digging Dogs: Luke And Ollie
24. When the Wind Blows: Belle
25. Tremendous Toes: Felix

=== Series 3: Go Eco! (2008) ===
The third series – Go Eco!, premiered on 13 June 2008 and continued on weekly until 15 August. It was commissioned as part of CBeebies' year-long green initiative called EcoBeebies, and so episodes focus on green-related topics. For this series only, the Experimenters wore green T-shirts instead of the light blue or red ones in other series.

1. Branching Out: Luke
2. Food, Glorious Food: Ollie And Bud
3. Keeping Cosy: Felix
4. Super Slimy Slugs: Luke
5. Mouldy Food: Luke
6. Something Fishy: Felix
7. Recycling: Luke
8. Flying High: Felix
9. Monkey Business: Bud
10. Every Drop Counts: Luke

=== Series 4: Go Inventing (2009) ===
The fourth series – Go Inventing, aired from 18 May-19 June 2009. This series focuses on how things work as Nina invites several young inventors to her lab to invent their own versions. This was the first series to have the children (referred to as "Inventors" in this series) wear red T-shirts, which would continue on for the rest of the series.

1. Bouncy Beds: Felix
2. Pen and Paper: Luke
3. Loud and Clear: Belle
4. In the Box: Luke
5. Mirror Mirror: Luke
6. Wheels: Felix
7. Clean It Up: Felix
8. Lift Off: Luke
9. Round and Round: Belle
10. Get Wet: Felix
11. Sliding Doors: Luke
12. Handy Handles: Felix
13. Cooking With Waves: Ollie And Bud
14. Time for Cogs: Belle
15. Hot and Cold: Felix
16. Buckle Up: Felix
17. Dirty Dishes: Luke
18. Top Taps: All Neurons
19. Keys: Belle
20. Eyes in the Dark: Luke
21. Near and Far: Luke
22. Hubble Bubble: Belle
23. In a Flush: Belle
24. Extraordinary X-Rays: Luke
25. Swish Swish: Luke

=== Series 5: In the Lab (2010) ===
The fifth series – In the Lab was broadcast weekly from 27 September-10 December 2010. In the show, Nina and the experimenters discover changes and reactions. From this series onwards, the experimenters also wore replicas of Nina's white coat alongside their red T-shirts.

1. Melty Chocolate: Bud And Ollie
2. Sleepy Dust: Luke
3. Rattling Pan: Belle
4. Burnt Toast: Bud And Ollie
5. Sugar and Teeth: Bud
6. Super Sand: Luke
7. Ferocious Fire: Felix
8. Soap Suds: Felix
9. Boats Float: Luke
10. Grass Stains: Luke
11. Salty Sea: Bud
12. Wobbly Jelly: Bud And Ollie
13. Steamy Mirrors: Luke
14. Fragrant Flowers: Ollie
15. Noisy Foods: Belle
16. Popcorn Pops: Belle
17. Sniffing Smells: Ollie
18. Mighty Metal: Luke
19. Sticky Jam: Felix
20. Bubbles Burst: Luke
21. Onions Make Us Cry: Luke
22. Wrinkly Fingers: Felix
23. Glow Stars: Luke
24. Wet Paint: Felix
25. Marvellous Milk: Bud

=== Series 6: Brilliant Bodies (2011) ===
The sixth series – Brilliant Bodies, focused on parts of the human body, and aired from 5 September 2011.

1. Heart: All Neurons
2. Handy Hands: Felix
3. Sneeze: Ollie
4. Two Ears: Belle
5. Blood: Luke
6. Brain: All Neurons
7. Wrinkly Face: Luke
8. Earwax: Belle
9. Exercise: Felix
10. Tickly Feet: Felix
11. Yawn: Belle
12. Digestion: Bud
13. Sleep: All Neurons
14. Eyelashes: Luke
15. Bellybuttons: Luke
16. Scabs: Luke
17. Eyes See: Luke
18. Burp: Bud
19. Spine: Felix
20. Breath: Ollie And Bud
21. Skin: Felix
22. Balance: All Neurons
23. Memory: All Neurons
24. Broken Bones: Felix
25. Fingertips Feel: Felix

=== Series 7: Go Engineering (2013) ===
The seventh series – Go Engineering, premiered at the start of 2013. It also focuses on inventions and how things work.

1. Aeroplanes: Luke
2. Glass: Luke
3. Electricity: Belle
4. Bin Lorry: Ollie
5. Hovercraft: Belle
6. Robots: All Neurons
7. Cranes: Luke
8. Hot Air Balloons: Luke
9. Ships: Felix
10. Roads: Luke
11. Tunnels: Luke
12. Cereal: Bud
13. Cable Cars: Luke
14. Steam Pump: Ollie
15. DVDs: All Neurons
16. Diving: Felix
17. Luggage: Luke
18. Biscuits: Bud
19. Cars: Belle
20. Computers: Felix and Luke
21. Tall Buildings: Luke
22. Canal Locks: Felix
23. Sticky Fabric: Felix
24. Bridges: Luke
25. Mobile Phones: Belle

=== Series 8: Earth Explorers (2013) ===
The eighth series – Earth Explorers, premiered in Late-2013 and has Nina and the explorers looking at earth, the sea, and beyond.

1. Space Rockets: Belle
2. Grand Canyon: Luke
3. Sand Dunes: Felix
4. Living in Space: Bud
5. Mountains: Luke
6. Volcanoes: Belle and Luke
7. Giant's Causeway: Felix
8. Solar System: Luke
9. Rivers: Felix and Belle
10. Exploring Space: All Neurons
11. Cliffs: Belle and Luke
12. Night and Day: Luke
13. Dinosaurs: Felix and Luke
14. Living on Earth: Felix
15. Stripy Rocks: Luke
16. Geysers: Ollie
17. Loch Ness: Felix
18. Moon Shape: Luke
19. Caves: Belle
20. Shooting Stars: Luke
21. Coal: Ollie
22. Earth Is Round: Luke
23. Deserts: Felix
24. Gravity: Felix
25. Waterfalls: Belle

=== Series 9: Get Sporty (2014) ===
The ninth series – Get Sporty, premiered in Early-2014, and focuses on the realm of professional sports and how they work.

1. Cycling: Felix
2. Curling: Belle
3. Football: Luke
4. Trampolining: Felix
5. Climbing: Felix
6. Rugby: Bud
7. Marathon: Ollie And Bud
8. Sprinting: Belle
9. Swimming: Felix
10. Long Jump: Felix
11. Snooker: Luke
12. Gymnastics: Felix
13. Diving: Belle
14. Cricket: Luke
15. Basketball: Luke

=== Series 10: Go Digital (2014) ===
The tenth series – Go Digital, premiered in Late-2014, and focuses on technology and gadgets, and how it works.

1. Driverless Cars: All Neurons
2. Internet: Belle and Luke
3. 3D Printing: Felix
4. Coding: All Neurons
5. Animation: Luke

=== Series 11: Get Building (2015) ===
The final series – Get Building, aired in 2015 and focused on how buildings and structures are constructed and how they stay together.

1. Triangles: Luke
2. Pointy Roofs: Belle
3. Piers: Ollie
4. Nests: Luke
5. Houses: Luke
6. Windmills: Belle
7. Beaver Dams: Belle
8. Skyscrapers: Felix and Luke
9. Bridges: Felix
10. Demolition: Belle
11. Floating Houses: Luke
12. Rollercoasters: Felix
13. Arches: Luke
14. Lighthouses: Luke
15. Living Underwater: All Neurons
16. Living Underground: Felix
17. Igloo: Felix
18. Spider's web: Bud
19. Domes: Luke
20. Amphitheatres: Belle

== Home media releases ==
Dvd title	Release date
Bright Ideas!	15 February 2010
