= Mr Bloom's Nursery =

British children's television series

- Genre: Children's television series
- Created by: Ben Faulks
- Written by: Ben Faulks; Adam Rudman; David Rudman
- Starring: Ben Faulks
- Voices of: Julie Westwood; Lizzie Waterworth; David Rudman; Phil Eason
- Country of origin: United Kingdom
- Original language: English
- No. of series: 3
- No. of episodes: 72 (+ 2 specials)

Production
- Executive producers: Ben Faulks; Adam Rudman

Original release
- Network: CBeebies
- Release: 7 February 2011 – 1 March 2013

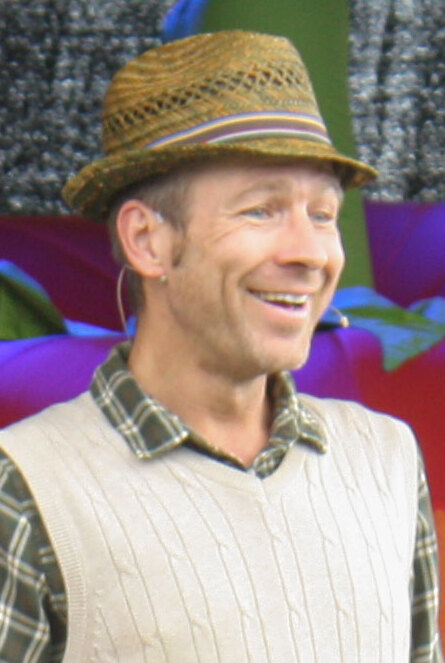
Ben Faulks (pictured as Mr Bloom in 2025) created and performed the titular character

Mr Bloom's Nursery is an educational children's television programme produced by the BBC. It aired on CBeebies in the UK from 7 February 2011 to 1 March 2013. Mr Bloom, created and performed by Ben Faulks, is a gardener who helps children to get involved and inspired by nature. Each episode sees a small group of children (whom he calls "tiddlers") visiting his allotment, feeding his "Compostarium" compost bin and interacting with puppet vegetables. The show has a similar concept to Mister Rogers’ Neighborhood.

The idea of the show originated from a piece of street theatre that Faulks had written in 2006 called The Vegetable Nannies; he had toured the play across the UK, as well as in Europe and Canada but wanted to pitch it as a preschool television show. Faulks developed it into a proposal in 2008, and it was picked up by the BBC in 2009. Mr. Bloom's Nursery won an RTS North and West Award for Best Children's Programme in 2011. Faulks was also nominated for the British Academy Children's Award for Best Performer in 2011 and 2012 for his performance as Mr Bloom.

== Episodes ==
=== Series 1 (2011) ===
	Episode	First aired
1	Stretch	7 February 2011
2	Worms	8 February 2011
3	Giant Turnip	9 February 2011
4	Blanket	10 February 2011
5	Grow Business	11 February 2011
6	Hide and Seek	14 February 2011
7	Underground	15 February 2011
8	Saving Bean	16 February 2011
9	Ladybird	17 February 2011
10	Right Size	18 February 2011
11	Funfair	21 February 2011
12	Snails	22 February 2011
13	Scared	23 February 2011
14	Music	24 February 2011
15	Bloom's Barbershop	25 February 2011
16	Energy	14 March 2011
17	Making Do	15 March 2011
18	Changing Colour	16 March 2011
19	Collecting Seeds	17 March 2011
20	Tidying	18 March 2011
21	Bounce	21 March 2011
22	Making Room	22 March 2011
23	Bees	23 March 2011
24	Accidents	24 March 2011
25	Labels	25 March 2011
26	Wind	28 March 2011

=== Series 2 (2012) ===
	Episode	First aired
1	Karaoke Cabbage	9 January 2012
2	The Great Squashini	10 January 2012
3	Knickerbocker Whopper Slopper	11 January 2012
4	Purple Princess	12 January 2012
5	Goldileaves and the Three Veggies	13 January 2012
6	Secret Friends	16 January 2012
7	Raymond's Robot	17 January 2012
8	Grand Veggie Fete	18 January 2012
9	Fun Run	19 January 2012
10	Vegetable Fool Day	20 January 2012
11	Seaside	23 January 2012
12	The Nutter Flower	24 January 2012
13	Stinky	25 January 2012
14	Tower Blocks	26 January 2012
15	Thank You Compo	27 January 2012
16	Show and Smell	20 February 2012
17	Strawberry Hats	21 February 2012
18	No Place Like Home	22 February 2012
19	Mulch Ado About Nothing	23 February 2012
20	Colin and the Giant Beanstalk	24 February 2012
21	Rubber Band Band	27 February 2012
22	Dragonfly Day	28 February 2012
23	Super Spud	29 February 2012
24	The Butterfly Express	1 March 2012
25	Rally Car Radishes	2 March 2012
26	Team Bloom	30 March 2012

=== Series 3: Get Set Grow! (2013) ===
	Episode	First aired
1	Popstar Cabbage	4 February 2013
2	Homemade Hat Parade	5 February 2013
3	The Great Mashathon	6 February 2013
4	The Sandwich Stealer	7 February 2013
5	Bed Time Trouble	8 February 2013
6	Jungle High Jinks	11 February 2013
7	Housewarming Party	12 February 2013
8	Maypole Mayhem	13 February 2013
9	Floating Funfair Fun	14 February 2013
10	The Caterpillar Trials	15 February 2013
11	Pirate Veggies	18 February 2013
12	Joan's Throne	19 February 2013
13	Barmy Balloon Safari	20 February 2013
14	Family Photo Tree	21 February 2013
15	Peas Freeze	22 February 2013
16	Sebastian's Pet	25 February 2013
17	Amazing Maize Maze	26 February 2013
18	Beanland	27 February 2013
19	Margaret's Space Tent	28 February 2013
20	Forget Me Not	1 March 2013
