= Hypnosis Mic discography =

Hypnosis Mic: Division Rap Battle is a Japanese multimedia series produced by King Records under their label Evil Line Records, centering on fictional rap groups representing various parts of Japan.

== Studio albums ==
List of albums, with selected chart positions, sales figures and certifications
| Title | Year | Album details | Peak chart positions | | Sales | Certifications |
| Title | Year | Album details | JPN Oricon | JPN Hot | Sales | Certifications |
|---|---|---|---|---|---|---|
| Buster Bros!!! VS Mad Trigger Crew | 2018 | Released: May 16, 2018; Label: King Records; Formats: CD, digital download | 2 | 3 | JPN: 73,635 | — |
| Fling Posse VS Matenro | 2018 | Released: July 18, 2018; Label: King Records; Formats: CD, digital download | 3 | 3 | JPN: 95,448 | RIAJ: Gold |
| Mad Trigger Crew VS Matenro | 2018 | Released: November 14, 2018; Label: King Records; Formats: CD, digital download | 1 | 1 | JPN: 115,766 | RIAJ: Gold |
| The Champion | 2019 | Released: February 27, 2019; Label: King Records; Formats: CD, digital download | 3 | 3 | JPN: 75,108 | RIAJ: Gold |
| Enter the Hypnosis Microphone | 2019 | Released: April 24, 2019; Label: King Records; Formats: CD, digital download | 2 | 2 | JPN: 179,859 | RIAJ: Gold |
| Ah Osaka Dreamin' Night | 2019 | Released: October 30, 2019; Label: King Records; Formats: CD, digital download | 2 | 2 | JPN: 136,001 | RIAJ: Gold |
| Bad Ass Temple Funky Sounds | 2019 | Released: November 27, 2019; Label: King Records; Formats: CD, digital download | 1 | 1 | JPN: 121,853 | RIAJ: Gold |
| Buster Bros!!!: Before the 2nd D.R.B | 2019 | Released: December 25, 2019; Label: King Records; Formats: CD, digital download | 1 | 1 | JPN: 51,990 | — |
| Mad Trigger Crew: Before the 2nd D.R.B | 2020 | Released: January 29, 2020; Label: King Records; Formats: CD, digital download | 1 | 1 | JPN: 57,633 | — |
| Fling Posse: Before the 2nd D.R.B | 2020 | Released: February 26, 2020; Label: King Records; Formats: CD, digital download | 2 | 2 | JPN: 56,749 | — |
| Matenro: Before the 2nd D.R.B | 2020 | Released: March 25, 2020; Label: King Records; Formats: CD, digital download | 2 | TBA | JPN: 53,506 | TBA |
| 2nd D.R.B: Dotsuitare Hompo VS Buster Bros!!! | 2021 | Released: February 24, 2021; Label: King Records; Formats: CD, digital download | 1 | TBA | JPN: 76,333 | — |
"—" denotes releases that did not chart or were not released in that region.

== Singles ==
List of singles, with selected chart positions, sales figures and certifications
| Title | Year | Peak chart positions | | | Sales | Album |
| Title | Year | JPN | JPN Hot | JPN Ani. | Sales | Album |
|---|---|---|---|---|---|---|
| "Buster Bros!!! Generation" | 2017 | 34 | — | — | JPN: 842 | Non-album single |
| "Bayside M.T.C" | 2017 | 29 | — | — | JPN: 3,298 | Non-album single |
| "Matenro (On'in Rinjo)" (麻天狼-音韻臨床-) | 2017 | 23 | — | — | JPN: 1,144 | Non-album single |
| "Fling Posse (F.P.S.M)" | 2018 | 11 | — | — | JPN: 5,376 | Non-album single |
"—" denotes releases that did not chart or were not released in that region.

== Other charted songs ==
| Title | Year | Peak chart positions | | Sales | Album |
| Title | Year | JPN Hot | JPN Ani | Sales | Album |
|---|---|---|---|---|---|
| "Drops" | 2018 | — | 16 | — | Non-album single |
| "Hypnosis Mic (Division Battle Anthem)" (ヒプノシスマイク -Division Battle Anthem-) | 2018 | 35 | 6 | JPN: 1,177+ | Enter the Hypnosis Microphone |
| "Battle Battle Battle" | 2018 | 17 | 5 | JPN: 1,948+ | Fling Posse VS Matenro |
| "Death Respect" | 2018 | 18 | 3 | JPN: 2,578+ | Mad Trigger Crew VS Matenro |
| "The Champion" | 2019 | 18 | 5 | JPN: 2,142+ | The Champion |
| "EZ Do Rap" | 2019 | 74 | 11 | — | Non-album single |
| "Hoodstar" | 2019 | 21 | 3 | — | Enter the Hypnosis Microphone |
| "Stella" | 2019 | 21 | 18 | — | Enter the Hypnosis Microphone |
| "Hypnosis Mic: Alternative Rap Battle" (ヒプノシスマイク -Alternative Rap Battle-) | 2019 | 8 | 1 | — | Non-album single |
| "Hypnosis Mic: Division Rap Battle +" (ヒプノシスマイク -Division Rap Battle- +) | 2019 | 11 | 3 | JPN: 37,960 (downloads) | Non-album single |
| "Ah Osaka Dreamin' Night" | 2019 | 7 | 2 | — | Ah Osaka Dreamin' Night |
| "Tragic Transistor" | 2019 | 59 | 14 | — | Ah Osaka Dreamin' Night |
| "Bad Ass Temple Funky Sounds" | 2019 | 19 | 6 | — | Bad Ass Temple Funky Sounds |
| "Sōgyaran Bam" (そうぎゃらんBAM) | 2019 | 38 | 9 | — | Bad Ass Temple Funky Sounds |
| "Gekkō Kage (Moonlight Shadow)" (月光陰 -Moonlight Shadow-) | 2019 | 71 | 19 | — | Bad Ass Temple Funky Sounds |
"—" denotes releases that did not chart or were not released in that region.
