= Ben Faulks =

British television actor

Benjamin Faulks
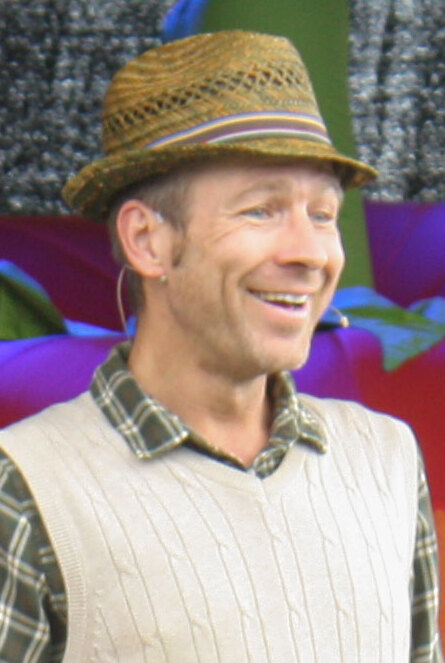
- Faulks as Mr Bloom in 2025
- Born: 13 March 1979 (age 47); Truro, Cornwall, England
- Occupations: Actor, television presenter
- Years active: 2011-present
- Notable work: Mr. Bloom's Nursery, Hollyoaks
- Children: 3
- Website: www.benfaulks.co.uk

Benjamin Faulks (born 13 March 1979) is a British actor and presenter. He is best known for creating the CBeebies television series Mr Bloom's Nursery in which he plays the titular character, for which he was nominated for a British Academy Children's Award in 2011 and 2012.

== Early life and education ==
Faulks was born and grew up in Cornwall and moved to Wakefield in 1998 to go to drama college. He attended Bretton Hall (now part of the University of Leeds) where he earned a first class degree in theatre acting, graduating in 2001.

== Career ==
Faulks won the Manchester Evening News Theatre Award for Best Fringe Performer in 2004 for a one-man play he created. In 2006, Faulks featured in a T-Mobile TV advert, and in 2007, starred in The Endurance at the Leeds Metropolitan University theatre.

The idea for Mr. Bloom's Nursery came from a piece of street theatre that Faulks had written in 2006 called The Vegetable Nannies; he had toured the play across the UK, as well as in Europe and Canada but wanted to pitch it as a preschool television show. Faulks developed it into a proposal in 2008, and it was picked up by the BBC in 2009. Mr. Bloom's Nursery won an RTS North and West Award for Best Children's Programme in 2011. Faulks was also nominated for the British Academy Children's Award for Best Performer in 2011 and 2012, but was beaten by Harley Bird for her voicing of Peppa Pig and Khalil Madovi for his role in 4 O'Clock Club respectively.

Faulks played Mark Brown in Hollyoaks in 2015. In 2021, he was announced as an ambassador for Ask the Question, a community interest company providing support to disadvantaged students.

== Personal life ==
Faulks' wife, Mimi, is a freelance creative producer and they often work together on projects. As of 2013, they have three children and live in Manchester.
