= Subzero =

Sub-zero literally means "beneath zero". As such, it is usually used for negative numbers; the most common usage refers to negative temperature.

Sub-zero can also refer to:

== Fictional characters ==
- Sub-Zero (Mortal Kombat), either of two characters from the video game series Mortal Kombat
  - Noob Saibot, a character introduced in Mortal Kombat II and later established as the original Sub-Zero from Mortal Kombat
  - Mortal Kombat Mythologies: Sub-Zero, a spin-off video game
- Sub-Zero (G.I. Joe), a fictional character in the G.I. Joe universe
- Sub-Zero, one of the "stalkers" from the movie The Running Man

== Film and television ==
- Sub Zero (film), a 2005 Canadian action film directed by Jim Wynorski
- Sub Zero (game show), a 1999–2001 British television game show for children produced by the BBC
- Batman & Mr. Freeze: SubZero, an animated 1998 film

== Other ==
- Geometry Dash SubZero, a 2017 spinoff of video game Geometry Dash
- SubZero (webcomic)
- Subzero (band), a hardcore punk band
- SubZero (brand), brand of musical equipment
- Subzero (horse), (1988-2020) an Australian racehorse that won the 1992 Melbourne Cup
- SUB ZERO (brand), outdoor clothing brand name
- Sub-Zero (company), a manufacturer of refrigerators and other kitchen appliances
- "Sub-Zer0", a song by Ho99o9 from the album United States of Horror
