= Hammercult =

Israeli-based thrash metal band

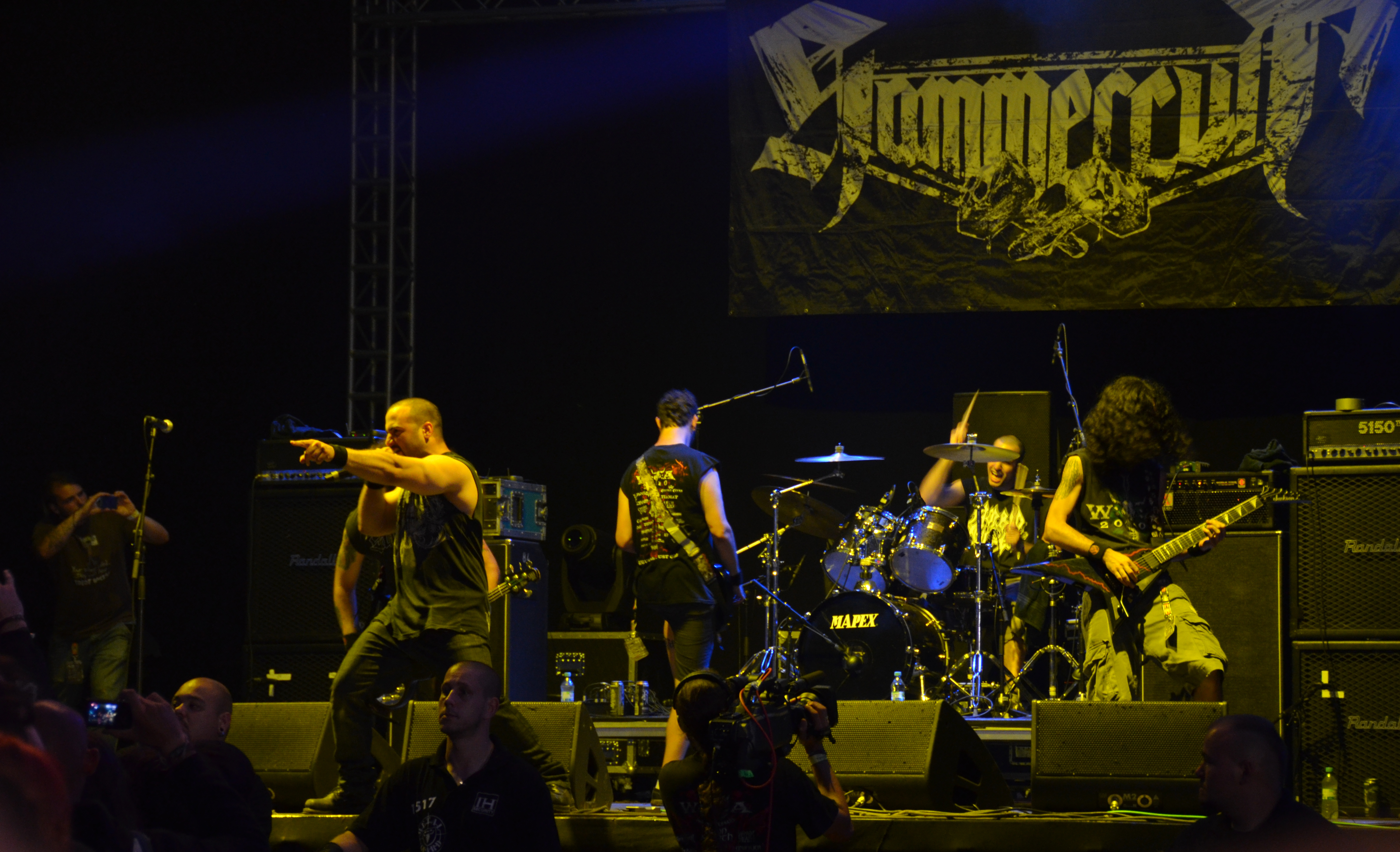

Background information
- Origin: Tel Aviv, Israel
- Genres: Thrash metal, Death Metal
- Years active: 2010–present
- Labels: Sonic Attack Records, SPV
- Members: Yakir Shochat
- Website: www.hammercult.com

Hammercult was an Israeli-based thrash metal band, founded in 2010.

== Band history ==
=== Formation, Rise of the Hammer EP and Wacken Metal Battle (2010–2011) ===
The official founding of the band took place in October 2010 with the band going into full activity on their first show a few months later in Be'er Sheva, Israel, on December 25, 2010. The band's line-up included Yakir Shochat (vocals), Arie Aranovich (guitar) and Elad Manor (bass), Guy Ben-David (guitar), and Maayan Henik (drums), making the band a supergroup in the Israeli heavy metal scene.

A few months following the band formation, the band released their first release, a 5 track digital EP named Rise Of The Hammer. The EP was available for free over the internet and made an impact in the underground scene.

On April 12, 2011, the band participated in the Israeli Wacken Metal Battle finals at Tel Aviv, where bands competed for a chance to represent Israel at the 2011 edition of Wacken Open Air, and compete against bands from the whole world. Hammercult won the competition by a huge gap, earning them a place at the 2011 W:O:A.

On July 28, 2011, a few days before leaving to perform at the Wacken Open Air festival, the band held a release show for their debut EP Rise of the Hammer in Tel Aviv.

On August 5, 2011, after performing at the Wacken Open Air Metal Battle contest on August 3, it was announced that Hammercult had beaten bands from all around the world and was declared as the winner of the 2011 edition of W:O:A Metal Battle, granting them new instruments and endorsements from various companies such as Washburn Guitars and Eden Electronics.

=== Gaining popularity and Anthems of the Damned album (2011–2012) ===
On September 29, 2011, it was announced that the band had signed with German label Sonic Attack Records, which is owned by famed manager Karl-Ulrich Walterbach, who is best known for founding the heavy metal label Noise Records, which signed such bands as Helloween, Kreator, Celtic Frost, Voivod, Rage and more. In November 2011, Hammercult kicked off their first European tour of 17 dates (November 4–20) as a direct support to US thrash/crossover band D.R.I. (Dirty Rotten Imbeciles). The same month Sonic Attack Records re-released the Rise of the Hammer EP as a limited promo for mostly media and tour promotion.

On April 20, 2012, the band released their debut full-length album Anthems of the Damned through Sonic Attack Records. The album was produced by the band's guitarist Arie Aranovich and mixed by former Hatesphere vocalist Jacob Bredahl. The band also played the 2012 edition of the Wacken Open Air festival, which was video-filmed and was included as a part of 'Live at Wacken 2012' DVD

In March 2012, it was announced that the band would be once again touring Europe, this time as main support for Sepultura in the upcoming summer to promote Anthems of the Damned. The tour was considered a major success with further European shows in June, and performing with other major acts such as Hatebreed and Malevolent Creation along with playing some of their own headlining shows.

On September 10, 2012, the band announced on their Facebook page that they had begun the writing process for their second full-length album.

=== Signing with SPV and the Steelcrusher album (2013–2014) ===
In early 2013 the band was selected for another European tour with Sepultura which took place on April–May 2013 and consisted on 19 shows across Europe. On June 3, 2013, the band announced on their Facebook page that they were signed to German label SPV GmbH, and that their upcoming second album would be released on that label. Artists that released albums on the SPV label include Sepultura, Kreator, Motörhead, Judas Priest and others. In June 2013, SPV re-released the first Hammercult album, Anthems of the Damned on vinyl format with 3 bonus tracks and a new cover art.

During the Summer of 2013, while recording their 2nd album, the band performed and multiple European Metal Festivals such as Metal Days, Summer Breeze and Open Air Berg. In December 2013 the band released their first video from their 2nd album, titled Steelcrusher.

In January 2014 their 2nd album Steelcrusher was released by SPV/Steamhammer record label on both CD and gatefold colored vinyl LP. Later that year, a Japan exclusive version of Steelcrusher was released on CD with additional bonus tracks by Japanese record label 'Spiritual Beast'.

The Steelcrusher album gained a very strong following in the mainstream metal scene and received many raving reviews on metal media such as RockHard and Metal Hammer.

As part of the promotion for the Steelcrusher album the band went on a European tour supporting Napalm Death in April 2014, and followed in October 2014 on their very first European headline tour. For further tour promotion the band played in many international festivals such as 'RockHarz', 'Rock Your Brain' and 'Brutal Assault'.

=== 'Built for War' and Relocating to Germany (2015–present) ===
'Built For War' was released worldwide via SPV/Steamhammer, On the 28th of August over Europe, and the 4th of September over the United States) and is regarded as the most successful Hammercult release to date, charting the German Metal and Rock Radio Charts top 10 for 2 weeks in a row and gaining a spotlight in the national playing radio (NPR) in the United States. The album contains a different vocal style and more melodic musical approach was embraced by both long time fans and helped the band gain further popularity among the mainstream metal media.

Due to the success of 'Built For War', the album was released in various formats, including a regular CD, a CD+DVD digipack with a live DVD video show entitled 'Live In Tel-Aviv' and a red color vinyl LP. In October 2015, 'Built For War' was released in an exclusive Japanese CD version which contained 2 bonus tracks by Japanese record label 'Spiritual Beast'.

In January 2016 Hammercult took part in a co-headline European tour with Dagoba and over the next few months played more headline shows across Germany.

In February 2016 Hammercult announced a handful of headline shows in April and an upcoming European tour with Municipal Waste which took place in June 2016. The band also confirmed a performance in With Full Force Festival.

== Band members ==
- Yakir Shochat - vocals (2010–present)

Current touring members

- Marcus "Rooky" Forstbauer - guitars (2016–present)
- Vincent Laboor - guitars (2016–present)
- Fulvio Calderone - bass (2016–present)
- Linus Haering - drums (2017–present)

Former members

- Elad Manor - bass (2010–2015)
- Arie Aranovich - guitars (2010–2013)
- Maayan Henik - drums (2010–2016)
- Guy Ben-David - guitars (2011–2012, 2013–2016)
- Yotam Nagor - guitars (2012)
- Guy Goldenberg - guitars (2013)
- Yuval Kramer - guitars (2015–2016, touring member 2013–2015)

Former touring members

- Alexander Backasch - guitars (2014, 2016)
- Björn Sypitzki - bass (2016)
- Ariel "Conan" Ron - guitars (2016)
- Jan Türk - drums (2016)
- Olli Kunze - drums (2017)

== Discography ==
Release date	Title	Type	Record label
2011	Rise of the Hammer	EP	Sonic Attack Records
2012	Anthems of the Damned	Full-length album	Sonic Attack Records
2014	Steelcrusher	Full-length album	SPV
2015	Built For War	Full-length album	SPV
2016	Legends Never Die	Compilation	SPV
