= Anthems of the Damned =

Studio album by Hammercult
- Released: April 20, 2012
- Recorded: December 2011–January 2012
- Genre: Thrash metal
- Label: Sonic Attack
- Producer: Arie Aranovich

Hammercult chronology
Rise of the Hammer (2011)	Anthems of the Damned (2012)

Anthems of the Damned is the debut full-length studio album by Israeli thrash metal band Hammercult, released on April 20, 2012 through Sonic Attack Records. The album was produced by the band's guitarist Arie Aranovich and mixed by former Hatesphere vocalist Jacob Bredahl.

The album included a digital bonus track of Hammercult covering classic Accept song 'Fast As a Shark'.

In June 2013 SPV re-released 'Anthems Of The Damned' on a limited edition red vinyl version which included 3 new bonus songs.

== Track listing ==
No.	Title	Length
1.	"Above the Ruins"	2:39
2.	"Let the Angels Burn"	3:02
3.	"Riding Through Hell"	2:55
4.	"Diabolic Overkill"	2:22
5.	"We Are Hammercult"	3:06
6.	"Black Horseman"	3:58
7.	"Stealer of Souls"	5:02
8.	"Hell's Unleashed"	2:24
9.	"Devil Chainsaw Fuck"	3:37
10.	"Hellbent"	2:10
11.	"Into the Death Gate"	3:33
12.	"The Damned"	2:24
13.	"Santa Satan"	1:45

== Personnel ==
- Yakir Shochat - vocals
- Arie Aranovich - guitars
- Guy Ben-David - guitars
- Elad Manor - bass, vocals
- Maayan Henik - drums

Additional personnel

- Jacob Bredahl (ex-Hatesphere) - guest vocals on "Black Horseman"
