= Gear4music =

British musical instrument retail company

Gear4music Limited
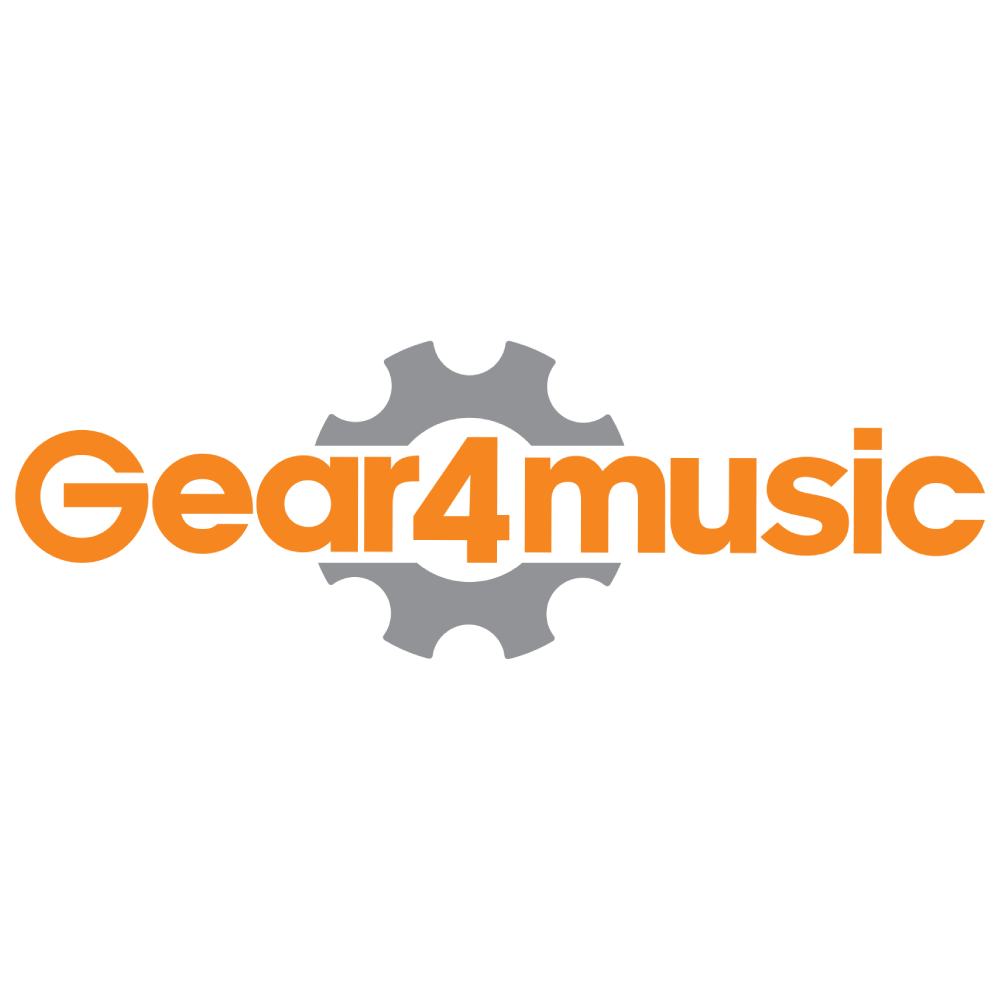

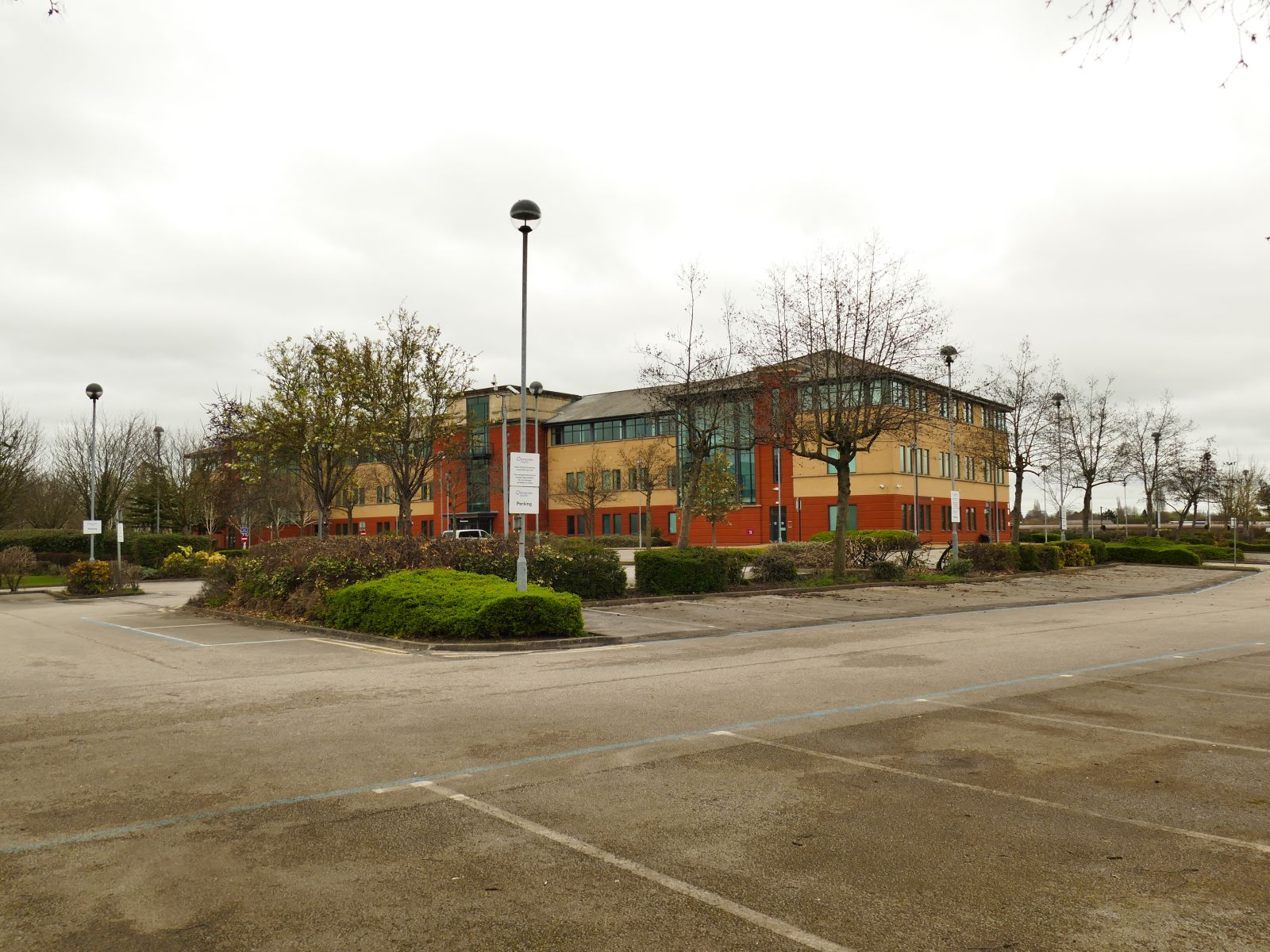
- Headquarters in York, UK
- Type: Public
- Industry: e-commerce
- Founded: 12 October 1995; 31 years ago
- Headquarters: York, England
- Number of locations: 6 distribution centres (2025)
- Key people: Andrew Wass (Executive Chair) Gareth Bevan (CEO) Chris Scott (CFO)
- Revenue: £190.7m (FY26)
- Website: gear4music.com

Gear4music is a British online retailer of musical instruments and audio equipment, headquartered in York, England. It sells to amateur and professional musicians through multilingual e-commerce platforms and operates distribution centres in England, Germany, Spain, Sweden and Ireland. Its catalogue includes guitars, drums and percussion, pianos and keyboards, orchestral instruments, live sound and lighting, music production, DJ equipment, music software and home audio products. Alongside products from third party manufacturers, the company develops and sells instruments and equipment under its house range, by Gear4music, and a portfolio of other proprietary brands. Gear4music also owns AV.com, a specialist retail website for home audio and hi‑fi equipment, with a warehouse and showroom based in Bacup.

== History ==
Gear4music traces its origins to 1995 when Andrew Wass, a musician who studied Popular Music and Sound Recording at the University of Salford, established a small commercial recording studio on his family's farm in North Yorkshire. During this period, he began supplying other studios with personal computer‑based digital recording systems, identifying a growing demand for affordable music technology. This activity ultimately led to the launch of the Gear4music e-commerce platform in 2003, initially listing a small range of imported guitars and generating £0.7 million in first‑year sales.

In 2012, the company secured £3.4 million in private equity investment from Key Capital Partners, enabling upgrades to its online retail platform and increasing international sales capacity. In 2013, it relocated to a larger York distribution centre and opened a 9,000 sq ft (840 m^{2}) showroom.

Gear4music floated on London's Alternative Investment Market in June 2015, valued at approximately £28 million, providing capital to accelerate expansion. In 2016, it opened its first overseas distribution centre in Sweden, followed by a German facility in 2017 and additional hubs in Ireland and Spain. Trade publications subsequently recognised it as one of the fastest‑growing musical instrument retailers globally, with like‑for‑like sales growth of 46 percent in 2016 alone.

During the COVID-19 pandemic, the shift to home‑based music making drove increased demand for instruments and studio gear. Gear4music reported revenues of £157.5 million for the year ending March 2021, up from £120.3 million the previous year. That same year, the company acquired Eden, a bass amplification brand, and Premier, a British drum and percussion manufacturer founded in 1922, strengthening its in‑house portfolio. It also acquired AV Online, rebranding it as AV.com, a specialist home audio and cinema platform, broadening its offering beyond musical instruments.

In 2023, Gear4music introduced a second‑hand trade‑in platform for musical equipment. In October 2024, it acquired Studiospares, a UK studio equipment supplier, and in 2025 launched its Sustainable Sound Scheme, pledging to plant a tree for every purchase of selected products. The company also purchased stock and digital assets from competitors PMT and GAK after their administrations in 2025.

By 2025, Gear4music operated websites in more than 15 languages, maintained distribution centres in five countries and reported annual revenues in the range of £140–150 million.

== Products ==
Gear4music sells a wide range of musical instruments and audio equipment through its online platforms, catering to both amateur and professional musicians. Its catalogue includes guitars, drums and percussion, pianos and keyboards, orchestral and brass instruments, live sound and lighting systems, DJ gear, recording and studio equipment, music production software, and accessories.

The company stocks products from many leading global manufacturers, including Yamaha, Fender, Roland, Casio and Gibson, alongside a range of in‑house brands covering most instrument categories. By 2024, Gear4music had become the UK's largest online retailer in this sector, listing more than 60,000 stock‑keeping units (SKUs) supplied by over 1,000 manufacturers. Prices range from low‑cost beginner instruments and accessories to professional‑grade equipment, designed to serve musicians across skill levels and budgets.

In 2023, Gear4music introduced a second-hand platform, offering a trade-in option for used equipment and to purchase refurbished instruments. Beyond musical instruments, the company has diversified into the home audio‑visual sector. In late 2021, it acquired AV Distribution Ltd, trading as AV Online, and launched AV.com as a site focused on hi‑fi speakers, home cinema systems and related electronics. The AV.com business operates alongside Gear4music's core musical instrument and recording product ranges, targeting both consumer and professional audio markets.

== Proprietary Brands ==
Gear4music's proprietary brand portfolio includes its house range, by Gear4music, alongside developed and acquired specialist brands spanning multiple instrument categories and price points. These brands are designed to complement offerings from established manufacturers and include the following:

- SubZero – PA speakers, microphones, mixers, effects pedals, studio monitors and other professional audio accessories.
- Archer – orchestral string instruments such as violins, violas and cellos.
- Coppergate – brass instruments such as trumpets, cornets and trombones.
- Rosedale – woodwind instruments including flutes, clarinets and saxophones.
- Hartwood – acoustic and electric guitars and associated accessories.
- Playlite – lightweight student‑focused brass and woodwind instruments.
- Gear4music (house label) – the company's house-brand range of entry-level instruments and accessories across multiple categories.
- G4M – premium own‑brand instruments and accessories aimed at intermediate and semi‑professional musicians.
- Premier – British drums and percussion brand founded in 1922, acquired in 2021.
- Eden – bass guitar amplification brand, acquired in 2021, formerly owned by Marshall Amplification.

By 2026, Gear4music's proprietary‑brand portfolio spanned beginner, intermediate and premium product ranges.

== Showrooms ==
Gear4music operates physical showrooms to complement its online retail platforms, allowing customers to test products before purchase and access in‑person support. The main showroom, located in the Clifton area of York, opened in 2014 and includes separate zones for guitars, keyboards, drums, orchestral instruments and live sound, as well as isolated rooms for testing high‑volume equipment.

To serve European customers, Gear4music established showrooms attached to its distribution centres in Rosersberg (near Stockholm), Sweden, and Mülheim an der Ruhr, Germany. The company also operates a showroom in Bacup, Lancashire, specialising in hi‑fi and home cinema products under the AV.com brand, featuring a dedicated home cinema demonstration space for high-end AV systems.

Showrooms function as customer service hubs, offering click‑and‑collect facilities for online orders, manufacturer product demonstrations, and specialist staff support.

== YouTube & Blog ==
Gear4music maintains an online content presence through its official blog and multiple YouTube channels. The blog publishes product news, buyers’ guides and music tutorials. The company's YouTube channels feature instrument demonstrations, gear reviews, and educational content segmented by instrument type.

Guest appearances on these channels have included musicians such as Josh Dunn, Jennifer Batten, George Kollias, and Frank Zummo. As of 2025, Gear4music's main guitar‑focused channel had more than 100,000 subscribers.

== Philanthropy ==
Gear4music supports several charitable and community initiatives, particularly those focused on music education, youth engagement, and social inclusion. The company has partnered with Music for All, Jessie's Fund, Changing Lives, and Girls Rock London. It's also supported Kitchen for Everyone York, a volunteer‑led initiative addressing food poverty and homelessness. In 2025, Gear4music launched its Sustainable Sound Scheme, pledging to plant a tree for every purchase of selected products.

== Reception ==
Gear4music has been rated positively by customers, holding a Trustpilot rating of 4.6 out of 5 based on over 137,000 reviews. Industry media have highlighted its rapid growth, while investor interest has followed its expansion and acquisitions.
