= AV.com =

British audio-visual equipment retailer

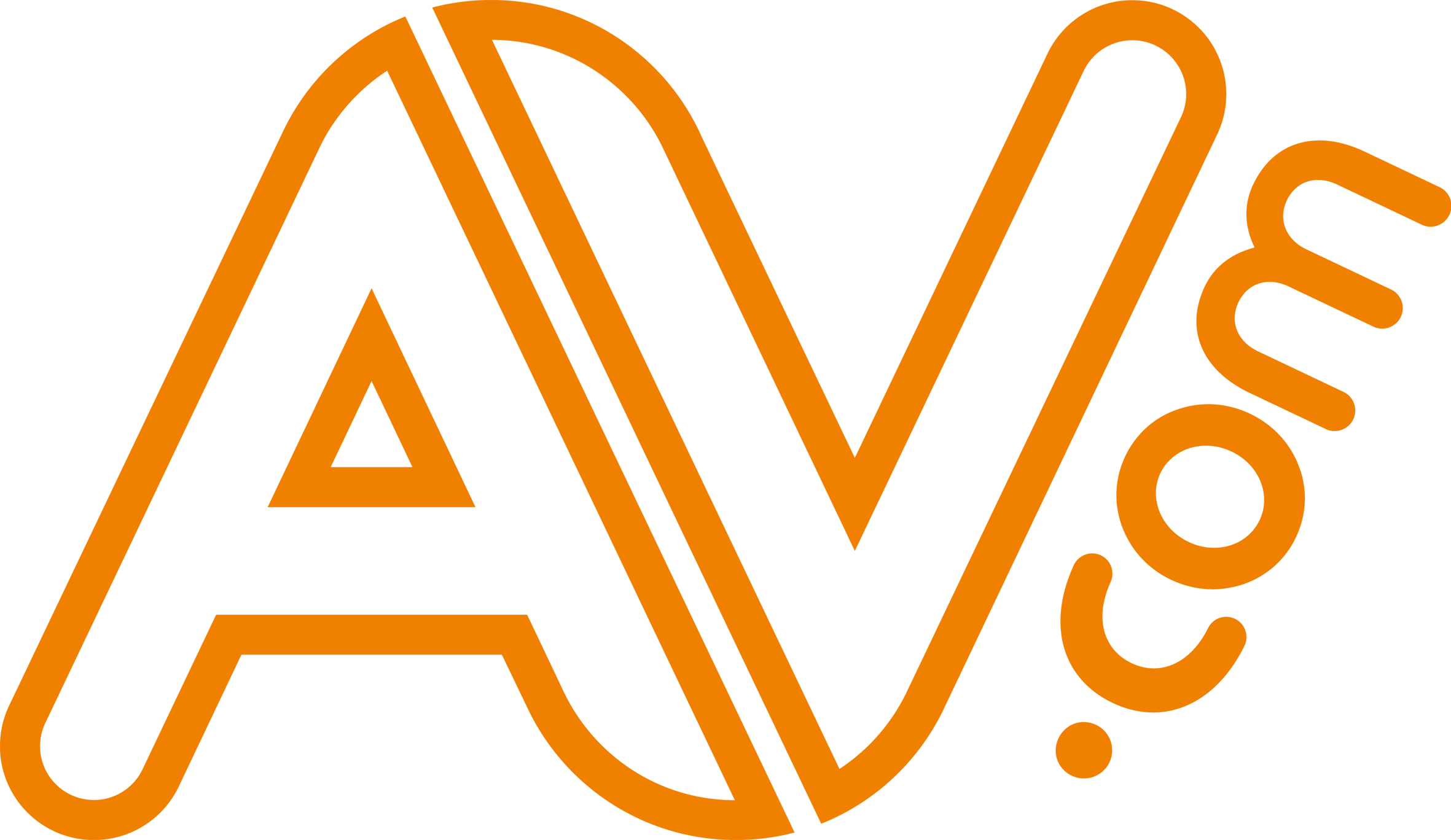
- Formerly: Audiovisualonline (AV Online)
- Type: Subsidiary
- Industry: Hi-Fi & Home Cinema
- Founder: Carl Pickles
- Headquarters: York, England
- Parent: Gear4music
- Website: av.com

AV.com is a British audio-visual equipment retailer founded in 2003 by Carl Pickles. Initially operating under the name Audiovisualonline (often shortened to AV Online), the company began as a small online business selling speaker cables from Pickles’s home in Lancashire.

The company has received independent coverage for its rapid growth during the COVID-19 lockdown period and for launching a refurbished showroom that features the UK’s first Monitor Audio Platinum 3G in-wall cinema experience room.

Over time, it expanded its product range to include hi-fi systems, home cinema equipment, and related accessories. Since its acquisition by Gear4music plc in 2022., the company has continued to develop its retail and e-commerce operations across the United Kingdom and European markets.

AV.com now operates from its head office in York and a 26,000-square-foot warehouse and showroom facility in Bacup, Lancashire, approximately 16 miles north of Manchester and within reach of several major cities in North West England.

== History ==
AV.com was founded in 2003 by Carl Pickles as an e-commerce enterprise focused on selling speaker cables. Initially operating from Pickles’s home in Bacup, Lancashire, the business traded as AV Distribution Ltd and launched its website under the name Audiovisualonline, commonly abbreviated to AV Online.

As HDMI and surround sound systems became more widespread, the company expanded its product range to include hi-fi and home cinema equipment, such as loudspeakers, headphones, specialised AV furniture, and related accessories.

In response to continued growth, AV Online moved operations to New Line Industrial Estate and, by 2009, had opened its first physical home cinema showroom to complement its online offering. The company expanded its warehouse and office space in 2015 and acquired a second building in 2017 for additional storage space.

In 2019, the business consolidated its operations into a 26,000 square foot facility housing offices, a showroom, warehouse, and a custom cable workshop under one roof.

The company’s revenue was primarily generated through its own website, with additional sales via Amazon, its Bacup showroom, and affiliated sites such as hificables.co.uk.

AV Online experienced increased sales during the UK’s COVID-19 lockdown, attributed in part to a rise in consumer interest in home renovation. In 2022, the company was acquired by Gear4music plc in a £9.2 million transaction.

Following the acquisition, AV Online was rebranded as AV.com and relaunched on Gear4music’s e-commerce platform. An equipment trade-in service, second-hand marketplace, and fully refurbished showroom were all launched shortly after the rebrand.

== Showroom ==
Since 2009, AV.com has operated a showroom at its Bacup site, and gradually expanded its hi-fi and home cinema demonstration facilities. In 2023, the Bacup facility underwent a full refurbishment following the company's acquisition by Gear4music.

The showroom launched with the UK’s first Monitor Audio Platinum 3G in-wall cinema experience room, showcasing the brand’s flagship Platinum In-Wall 3G speakers in a pre-arranged, appointment-only setting.

The showroom features products from brands such as Denon, Marantz, Wharfedale, Bowers & Wilkins, and Monitor Audio. Notable installations include the UK’s first Monitor Audio Platinum 3G home cinema experience room.

== Products ==
The bulk of AV.com's business centres on the retail of home cinema and hi-fi equipment, catering primarily to the mid-to-high-end segment of the consumer AV market.

AV.com sells home-cinema and hi-fi equipment and related accessories across multiple brands, and also markets products under its own brand name, AVCOM.

== Acquisition by Gear4music ==
In 2021, Gear4music plc, a UK-based musical instrument and audio equipment retailer, announced its intention to acquire AV Distribution Ltd., along with the AV.com domain name. The transaction was split into two elements: £6.2 million for the trading business and £3 million for the domain, which AV Online had not previously owned.

The acquisition included £2.5 million in inventory and a freehold warehouse property valued at £1.3 million. Gear4music stated that the purchase would expand its offering in the specialist audio-visual market and enhance its direct-to-consumer operations.

The acquisition of the AV.com domain was also positioned as a strategic move to increase brand visibility, improve memorability, and support international e-commerce growth through a name that is easier to remember and promote globally. Following the acquisition, Gear4music continued to invest in its distribution infrastructure to support growth. In 2025, the company reported plans to establish a new distribution centre in Yorkshire, expected to increase UK distribution capacity significantly and support long-term expansion.

== YouTube & Blog ==
AV.com maintains an official YouTube channel and blog focused on home cinema and hi-fi.

The YouTube channel has accumulated over 1,000,000 views according to Social Blade. The channel features content such as setup guidance, product demonstrations, and showroom interviews with individuals from the audio-visual industry.

The blog publishes articles covering topics such as product reviews, new releases, and comparative buying guides. In October 2026, the company launched an official subreddit to provide customer support and host community discussions.

== Reception ==
AV.com has been rated positively by customers, holding a Trustpilot rating of 4.8 out of 5 based on over 3,600 reviews.
