= Eden Electronics =

Bass amplification manufacturer

Eden Amplification
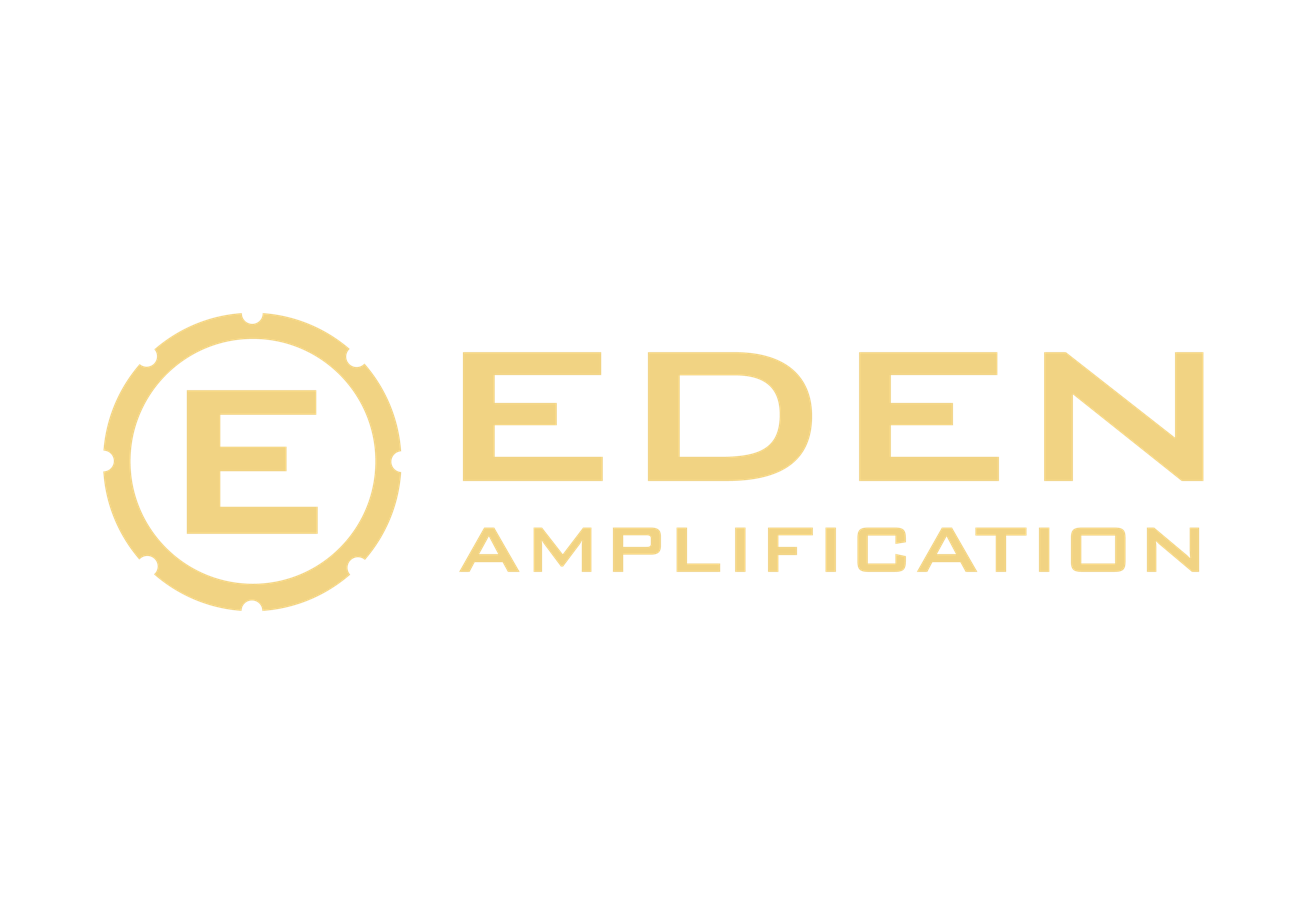
- Type: Subsidiary
- Industry: Bass amplification
- Founded: 1976; 50 years ago
- Founder: David Nordschow
- Headquarters: Holgate, York
- Products: bass amplification
- Parent: Gear4music
- Website: edenamps.com

Eden Amplification (formerly Eden Electronics) is a bass amplification brand founded in 1976 by David Nordschow in Montrose, Minnesota. The company is known for designing and manufacturing bass amplifiers, speaker cabinets, preamplifiers, and effects pedals. Its most recognised product lines include the World Tour amplifier series and D-series speaker cabinets. Eden developed a reputation for building all of its equipment in-house, an uncommon practice among amplification manufacturers.

Eden amplifiers are used by a variety of musicians, but are particularly favoured by session players and recording artists known for their technical proficiency. As of 2021, the brand is owned by UK-based musical instrument retailer Gear4music.

== History ==
=== Beginnings ===
Eden Electronics was founded in 1976 by David Nordschow in Montrose, Minnesota, as a specialist builder of sound reinforcement systems for professional musicians and venues. The company name is derived from Eden Prairie, Minnesota, where Nordschow first developed the concept.

Initially, Eden focused on building speaker cabinets and drivers for PA systems, working as an OEM supplier for other audio brands. This early phase emphasised in-house design and manufacturing, a principle that remained central to the brand’s identity throughout its development.

One of Eden’s formative contributions was its involvement in the creation of the SWR Goliath; a 4x10” bass cabinet that set new standards in bass frequency clarity. Although SWR became a separate brand, Eden’s engineering and design work on the Goliath helped shape its approach to hi-fidelity bass tone, prioritising clarity, power handling, and low-end articulation.

After releasing its own branded products, Eden quickly earned a reputation among session musicians, touring professionals, and technically oriented players for its clean tone and transparent amplification. This niche positioning contributed to the company’s early success and sustained recognition in the professional bass community.

=== World Tour series and D-Series (circa 1990s–2000s) ===
Eden’s World Tour series (often abbreviated “WT-series”) was designed and built in-house, reflecting the company’s philosophy of high-fidelity, clean, uncoloured amplification with substantial headroom. A notable model, the WT-300, featured a hybrid design combining a valve preamp with a solid-state power section, and was capable of delivering 300 watts RMS into 4 ohms. Its tone controls, including a semi-parametric EQ and the “Enhance” contour knob, made it especially responsive to dynamic playing styles. The compact design and tonal clarity made the WT-300 a popular choice for session musicians and recording artists.

The WT-800 amplifier head, introduced as a higher-power model within the same series, was widely used for touring and stage applications, offering increased output and expanded tonal shaping. Its performance characteristics made it a flagship product for professional users seeking consistent, road-ready gear.

In parallel, the D-Series speaker cabinets were developed to complement the World Tour heads. These cabinets were designed for efficiency, sonic transparency, and tight low-frequency response, enabling bassists to maintain clarity at high volumes with less power demand. The D-Series became a standard pairing with WT heads, particularly among touring professionals and players who required precise tone reproduction.

=== Nemesis series (1995) ===
In the mid-1990s, Eden launched the Nemesis series to offer a more affordable range of bass amplification equipment. The line was developed to deliver core elements of Eden’s tonal philosophy (clarity, reliability, and headroom) at a lower price point, targeting semi-professional musicians and serious hobbyists.

The Nemesis range featured solid-state amplification, typically using FET (field-effect transistor) circuits in both the preamp and output stages. While Eden's premium products were known for hybrid tube designs, the Nemesis line provided a transistor-based alternative that retained a clean, responsive sound signature.

Later iterations, such as the NC series, incorporated lightweight cabinet designs and streamlined control layouts, with production gradually moving overseas as part of Eden's broader manufacturing strategy. Although positioned below the World Tour and D-series products, Nemesis maintained a consistent focus on tone and performance, offering accessible amplification without compromising Eden’s reputation for quality engineering.

=== Expansion (1990s–2010) ===
Throughout the 1990s and early 2000s, Eden grew into one of the leading bass amplification brands, recognised for its super-clean tone, durable construction, and in-house design philosophy. Its products gained popularity not only among rock musicians, but also among session bassists and recording artists. Notable users during this period included Mike Rutherford of Genesis and Phil Lesh of Grateful Dead, contributing to Eden's visibility within professional music circles.

In 2002, Eden was acquired by U.S. Music Corporation, the parent company of Washburn Guitars. This acquisition provided increased resources for research, development, and manufacturing, and facilitated the relocation of production from Minnesota to the Chicago area. During this time, Eden expanded its lineup to include entry-level amplifiers and combo units, targeting novice players alongside its traditional high-end user base.

Founder David Nordschow later left the company and went on to establish David Nordschow Amplification in 2010. That same year, Eden introduced its first pedal, the WTDI, a compact preamp/DI box based on the World Tour circuitry. The pedal became one of Eden’s best-selling products, offering studio-quality tone in a portable format tailored to modern bassists’ needs.

=== Acquisition by Marshall ===
In December 2011, Marshall Amplification acquired Eden from U.S. Music Corporation, marking the company’s second major ownership transition. Following the acquisition, Eden’s operations and headquarters were relocated to Marshall’s facility in Bletchley, England, aligning the brand more closely with Marshall’s UK-based infrastructure.

The deal enabled Eden to benefit from Marshall’s established global distribution, particularly expanding its presence across Europe and Asia, and making the brand more widely accessible in international markets. During this period, Eden also began to expand its product lineup, developing new models while continuing the legacy of its World Tour series.

By the mid-2010s, Eden resumed in-house construction of select speaker cabinets and components, a return to its earlier manufacturing model that had previously set it apart from competitors. This shift was seen as a re-emphasis on build quality and sonic integrity.

=== Acquisition by Gear4music ===
In March 2021, Gear4music, a UK-based musical instrument retailer, acquired the Eden Amplification brand and its associated assets from Marshall Amplification. The sale formed part of Marshall’s broader strategy to divest from non-core brands, while Gear4music sought to grow its portfolio by acquiring established music equipment names.

As part of its post-acquisition strategy, Gear4music positioned Eden as a heritage bass amplification brand, complementing other legacy names in its catalogue, such as Premier Drums. The acquisition reportedly cost around £140,000, with a significant portion of the payment deferred, reflecting Eden’s reduced market presence by 2021.

Under the terms of the deal, Gear4music obtained Eden’s trademarks, product designs, and remaining inventory, with plans to revitalise the brand and reintroduce products through its existing retail infrastructure.

== Products ==
=== WT300 and WT800 (World Tour series) ===
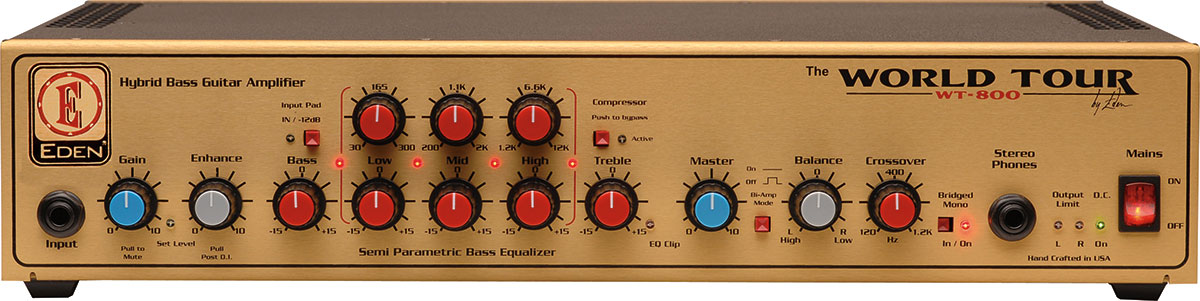
Eden WT800 World Tour Series Bass Amplifier.

The WT300, introduced in 1993, and the later WT800 became Eden’s flagship amplifier heads, solidifying the brand’s reputation for delivering professional-grade bass tone. Both models featured a hybrid design with a tube preamp and solid-state power section, along with Eden’s hallmark features: the “Enhance” EQ contour, a five-band semi-parametric EQ, and a built-in compressor.

The WT300 delivered 300 watts RMS into 4 ohms, while the WT800 could produce between 800 and 1100 watts, using dual power amps that could operate in stereo or bridged mono mode. These amps were designed for touring professionals, offering studio-level tonal precision with the durability required for live performance. Their clarity, flexibility, and reliability made them a preferred choice among session bassists and gigging musicians, contributing to Eden’s status as a boutique amplification brand in the 1990s and 2000s.

=== D410XLT Cabinet (David Series) ===
The D410XLT is one of Eden’s most recognisable speaker cabinets, introduced as part of the David Series. Designed for high-output stage use, it features four 10-inch cast-frame drivers paired with a high-frequency horn in a dual-ported enclosure. The cabinet delivers around 700–750 watts RMS, depending on the impedance version.

Built for durability and tonal clarity, the D410XLT became a popular choice among touring bassists and live engineers who needed consistent, full-range projection. Its tonal profile, combined with road-ready construction, positioned it as a standard pairing with Eden’s World Tour amplifier heads. The cabinet's design prioritises efficiency and definition, offering players the ability to cut through dense mixes on larger stages without sacrificing warmth or detail.

=== Nemesis Series ===
The Nemesis series was introduced by Eden as a more accessible alternative to its premium World Tour line. Designed for players seeking reliable amplification at a lower price point, the series retained key Eden design features while reducing cost through simplified circuitry and lighter construction.

The NA650 head delivered 650 watts RMS at 2 ohms via an all-FET output stage, and included features such as semi-parametric EQ, Enhance and Edge filters, gain boost, and a switchable DI output.

According to the manufacturer’s manual, the NA650 was intended to offer clarity and control for a wide range of musical settings, without the tube colouration of Eden’s higher-end amplifiers. The Nemesis range was originally built in the United States and later moved to overseas production during its lifespan. It was particularly aimed at gigging musicians and serious hobbyists who needed performance and portability without boutique pricing.

=== WT550 and WT400 ===
The WT550 and WT400 were key amplifier heads in Eden’s World Tour series, combining hybrid preamp designs with extensive tone-shaping controls. The WT550 delivers up to 750 watts RMS at 2 ohms (500 W at 4 ohms), and includes a valve (tube) preamp, five-band semi-parametric EQ, “Enhance” filter, switchable compression, and a rack-mountable chassis. Built with a modular architecture and thermostatically controlled cooling, it was engineered for long-term reliability in touring environments.

The WT400, an earlier model, produces 400 watts RMS at 4 ohms and features a similar hybrid design with 3 dB of dynamic headroom. It also includes Eden’s signature “Enhance” control, onboard compression, DI output, and headphone/tuner ports. Its combination of portability and tonal flexibility made it popular among live performers and studio bassists alike.

=== WTDI Pedal ===
Launched in 2010, the WTDI pedal was designed to deliver Eden’s World Tour tone circuit in a portable, pedalboard-friendly format. It features a 3-band EQ with bass boost and mid-shift switches, an onboard compressor, Enhance control, and gain/master level dials. Connectivity includes ¼-inch and balanced XLR outputs, making the unit suitable for both live and studio environments. It is powered by a 15V DC supply and housed in a compact, road-ready chassis.

The WTDI quickly became one of Eden’s most widely used products, particularly among bassists looking for DI and preamp functionality without carrying a full amplifier. It appealed to players using direct rigs, gigging in smaller venues, or requiring a versatile tone solution for practice, recording, or backup use.

=== World Tour Pro series (WTP600, WTP900, WTP-PRE) ===
Introduced in 2015, Eden’s World Tour Pro series (WTP600, WTP900, and WTP‑PRE) was designed to modernise its long-running World Tour line. These models feature a hybrid preamp with Eden’s signature Tube Mix control, allowing users to blend tube tone with clean signal. Each unit also includes an upgraded compressor, Enhance filter, 5-band semi-parametric EQ, and high-current output stages. Rugged steel chassis and improved cooling systems were added to meet professional reliability needs.

The WTP600 offers 600 watts RMS, suitable for medium to large stages, while the WTP900 provides 900 watts (or 2×450 W in stereo) for larger touring rigs. The WTP‑PRE preamp model omits the power section, offering studio‑grade tone shaping in a rack-mount format. These amps are targeted at touring bassists and session musicians who require tonal flexibility, road durability, and Eden’s high-fidelity sound in a more modern, feature-rich format.

=== Terra Nova Series (TN226, TN501) ===
Introduced in 2016, Eden’s Terra Nova series marked the company’s entry into lightweight, portable bass amplification. Designed around Class-D architecture, the TN226 delivers 225 watts in a compact head weighing just 2.15 kg (4.7 lbs). It includes Eden’s signature Enhance control, studio-grade compressor, 4-band semi-parametric EQ, effects loop, DI output (pre/post), and inputs for both active and passive instruments.

The TN501 expands the format to 500 watts and retains the core tonal architecture. It offers additional features including bass boost, tuner output, headphone output, and an auxiliary input for practice or playback. The TN501’s small form factor and professional connectivity made it particularly suitable for gigging bassists who needed clean tone, high output, and portability without compromising tone-shaping control. Both models were designed to appeal to modern players seeking Eden’s tone in smaller, more efficient formats appropriate for rehearsal, small venue work, and touring rigs.

=== E300 Head and Orbiter Combos ===
Post‑2021, Eden’s lineup was repositioned toward budget-conscious musicians, with new products designed to offer core tone‑shaping features in simpler, more affordable formats. The E300 head is a 300-watt solid-state amplifier with a 3-band EQ, compressor, Enhance control, and both balanced DI and headphone outputs. Weighing about 7.4 kg, it is marketed as an ideal solution for entry-level touring, rehearsal, or home practice.

The Orbiter series consists of small-format bass combos ranging from 20 to 120 watts, designed for practice and small venues. Models such as the Orbiter 10 and 15 include Eden’s EQ section, auxiliary input, headphone out, and compact speaker configurations. While these models are no longer positioned as boutique offerings, they retain Eden’s reputation for clean, uncoloured tone in a portable and accessible design. Current production for these models is based in China, with global distribution handled via Gear4music’s retail platform.

=== Post-Acquisition ===
Since its acquisition by Gear4music in March 2021, Eden Amplification has been incorporated into the retailer’s own-brand portfolio. Gear4music’s FY21 financial report described the Eden and Premier Drums acquisitions as part of an expansion of its exclusive product range during what it termed a year of “exceptional financial performance”.

Following the acquisition, Eden products have been released in simplified, lower-cost formats. The E300 head, for example, has been marketed as an introductory model that combines Eden’s Enhance control, three-band EQ, and compression in a budget-oriented design. The Orbiter combo series similarly offers low-wattage, compact models aimed at home practice or small venue use.

In 2025, Eden introduced the NovaTone series, comprising solid-state amplifier heads (300- and 500-watt models), modular combo amplifiers, and speaker cabinets in formats such as 1×15, 2×10, 2×12, and 4×10. The cabinets are designed to operate independently or house NovaTone heads for use as combo units.

Under Gear4music, Eden has shifted toward affordability while continuing to emphasise clean, high-fidelity bass tone. The brand no longer produces high-end flagship amplifiers comparable to its 1990s models, instead focusing on accessible products that maintain elements of its established sound.
