= Hartwood (brand) =

British musical instrument brand

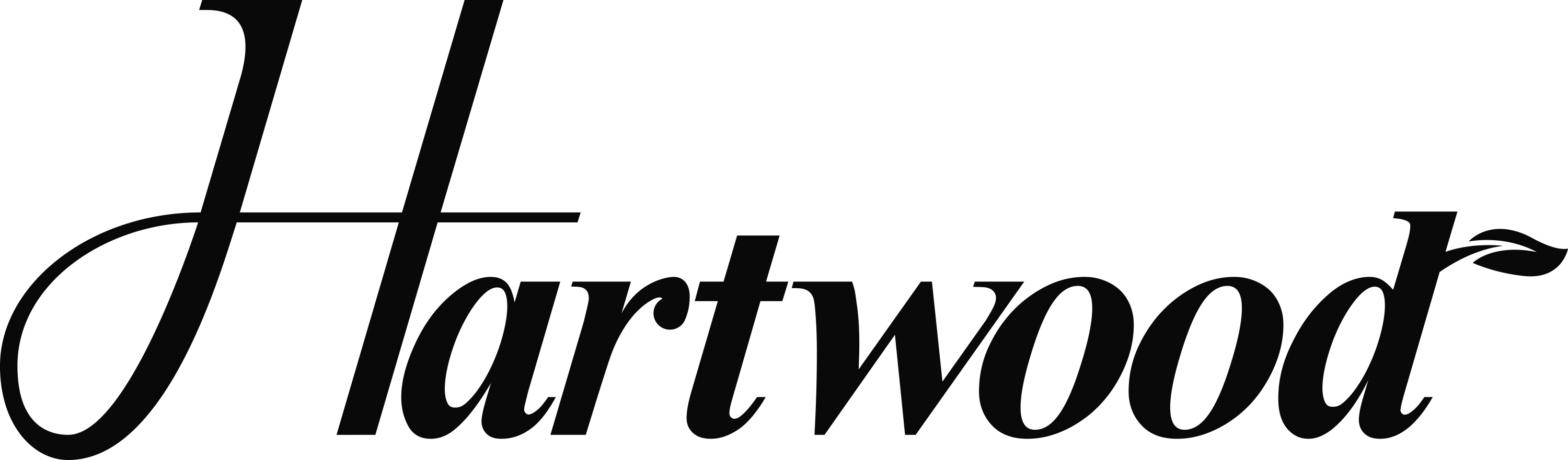
- Product type: Musical instruments
- Current owner: Gear4music
- Introduced: 2018
- Markets: UK and Europe

Hartwood is a British musical instrument brand launched in 2018 by Gear4music. Hartwood produces guitars, basses, amplifiers, and accessories that are primarily aimed at beginner and intermediate players.

Positioned between entry-level and higher-specification instruments, the brand has been the subject of reviews commenting on build quality in relation to price. Hartwood instruments have been described as being used by learners, intermediate players, and musicians seeking secondary instruments.

== History ==
Hartwood was launched in 2018 by Gear4music as part of its strategy to expand house-brand offerings. The brand was established to provide lower-cost alternatives to established manufacturers, with features such as roasted maple necks, coil-splittable pickups, and integrated acoustic effects more typically associated with higher-priced models.

Since launch, Hartwood has expanded its catalogue to include acoustic guitars, basses, amplifiers, and accessories. By 2019, the brand had introduced acoustic models such as the Villanelle parlour and the Renaissance classical. In 2020, it added electric designs, including the Fifty6, targeted at rock players. In 2023–2024, the line grew to include short-scale bass guitars, electro-acoustic models with built-in effects, and compact valve amplifiers.

Reviews of Hartwood instruments have highlighted their design features and perceived build quality in relation to price. The Guitaristas YouTube channel described Hartwood as "a budget range that caught our eye," noting its distinctive designs. Models such as the Charger and Drifter have received commentary noting their specifications and price positioning, with some comparisons made to similarly-priced instruments. Guitar.com has described Hartwood as having a distinct brand identity.

== Electric Guitars ==
Hartwood's electric guitar range includes solid-body, semi-hollow, and fully hollow models. Many feature retro-inspired offset bodies and vintage styling, combined with modern upgrades such as roasted maple necks, coil-splittable pickups, and locking tuners. The line is aimed at beginner to intermediate players and those seeking instruments that could be modified.

Notable models include:

- Hartwood Charger – An offset solid-body with dual humbuckers, 24 frets, roasted maple neck, and locking tuners. It has been described by Guitar.com as “a sleeper rock machine disguised as a vintage oddity,” noted for its tone and playability though less so for its coil-split sounds.
- Hartwood Deytona II – A compact, Firebird-inspired model with mini-humbuckers, ebony fretboard, and set-neck construction. Its phase switching and lightweight build have been highlighted as uncommon in this price category.
- Hartwood Drifter – An offset guitar featuring P-90 pickups and a satin-finished roasted maple neck. It has been reviewed on YouTube by several guitar-focused channels, which have commented on its construction in relation to its price.
- Hartwood Fifty6 – Introduced in 2020, this double-cutaway guitar features 24 frets, high-output humbuckers, and an alder body. While referencing 1950s styling, it been described as being used in rock and metal styles.
- Hartwood Speedway – A semi-hollow thinline guitar featuring a basswood body, dual chrome humbuckers, and a vibrato tailpiece. Its design incorporates elements such as racing stripes and pearloid detailing, drawing on vintage styling.

Hartwood also produces hollow-body and semi-hollow models associated with jazz and blues styles, described as having traditional tonal characteristics.

The electric range has received commentary from reviewers and online sources identifying the Drifter and Charger as options within the entry-level category.

== Acoustic Guitars ==
Hartwood's acoustic guitar line includes steel-string and nylon-string models in dreadnought, parlour, and travel-sized formats. The range is intended for beginner and intermediate players, incorporating traditional design elements alongside features intended to improve playability at lower price points.

Notable models include:

- Hartwood Prime Dreadnought – An entry-level model with a solid spruce top and laminate sapele back and sides. It has been noted for producing strong projection and a balanced response for both strumming and fingerpicking.
- Hartwood Villanelle Dreadnought – A mid-range electro-acoustic featuring a solid Engelmann spruce top, mahogany body, and Fishman preamp. Reviews describe its tone as balanced with clear highs and tight bass, noted as an option within its price range.
- Hartwood Sonata FX – Incorporates onboard effects such as reverb, chorus, and delay. It has been described as enhancing live sound while removing the need for external pedals.
- Hartwood Artiste OM – Released in 2024, this orchestra model includes a bevelled armrest, bone saddle and nut, and solid tonewoods.
- Hartwood Renaissance Classical – A nylon-string guitar featuring an all-mahogany body and walnut fingerboard.

The acoustic range has been reviewed as offering models that retain playability and tonal consistency across price brackets, with commentary noting use by students and amateur performers.

== Basses ==
Hartwood introduced its first bass guitars in 2023, focusing on short-scale instruments designed to appeal to beginners, guitarists transitioning to bass, and players seeking compact alternatives.

Key models include:

- Hartwood Satellite Bass – A 30-inch scale, offset-body bass with a distinctive sweeping pickguard and metallic finish. It is equipped with a P/J pickup configuration.
- Hartwood Delta Bass – A more traditional short-scale offset bass, available in colours such as Metallic Blue and Sunburst. With a roasted maple neck, 30″ scale, and vintage-style pickups, highlighted on BassBuzz as an option for new players.

As of 2025, the brand does not yet produce long-scale (34″) basses, instead concentrating on compact models with distinctive styling.

== Amplifiers ==
Hartwood produces amplifiers for both electric and acoustic guitar, primarily intended for home use, practice, and small-scale performance.

Notable models include:

- Hartwood Interceptor Valve Amp – A 15-watt all-valve combo featuring a Celestion Vintage 30 speaker, spring reverb, and EL84/12AX7 tube configuration. Reviewers have described it as producing valve-like tone within its price range and have compared it to other entry-level valve amplifiers.
- Hartwood Interceptor Mini Stack – A variation of the Interceptor presented as a head and vertical 2×12 cabinet. It includes an FX loop and switchable output load, offering an alternative for players preferring separate components.
- Hartwood 15W Acoustic Amp – A compact amplifier with a 6.5″ speaker, three-band EQ, and built-in chorus, designed for amplifying acoustic guitar and vocals in small spaces.
- Hartwood Portable Acoustic Amplifier with Effects & Bluetooth – A battery-powered 15W combo with integrated effects and Bluetooth playback, designed for mobile use including busking and location-based performance. It has been identified in reviews as an option within its category.
- Hartwood 60W Acoustic Amp – A larger-format acoustic amplifier with dual channels, designed for small venues and increased headroom while maintaining a clean sound profile.

The amplifier range is reviewed as being used by learners and hobbyists, and sold as part of Hartwood's broader instrument catalogue.

== Accessories ==
Hartwood offers a range of accessories for guitarists, including effects pedals, gig bags, pedalboards, straps, stands, and maintenance kits.

Among the brand's accessories are a series of compact pedals, including the Collinsville Chorus, Santa Fe Fuzz, Blue Ridge Drive, and Beartooth Distortion. These models feature retro-style enclosures and simplified controls, and are sold as entry-level options for players beginning to explore effects. Independent reviewers have noted that the Collinsville Chorus provides modulation tones within its price range.

Other accessories include padded gig bags and cases, which are supplied with selected instruments or sold separately, providing protection during storage and transport. Hartwood also produces pedalboard and power supply bundles that include compact boards and introductory pedals, intended for players building an initial effects setup. The Evening Standard listed the Hartwood Wooden Floor Stand among its recommended guitar stands in 2025.
