= SubZero (brand) =

Brand of musical equipment by Gear4music

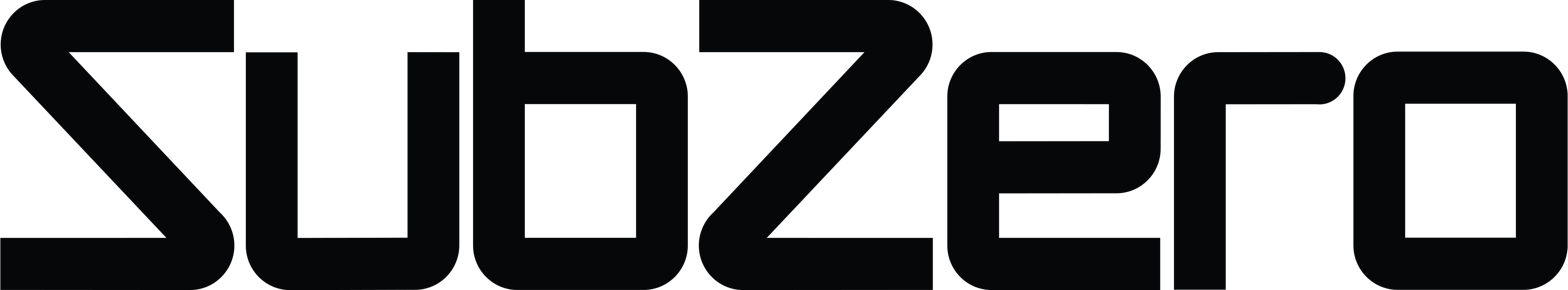
- Product type: Musical instruments and audio equipment
- Current owner: Gear4music
- Introduced: 2003
- Markets: UK and Europe

SubZero is a brand of musical equipment owned and developed by the UK-based retailer Gear4music. Established in 2003, the brand includes a range of products such as microphones, PA systems, MIDI controllers, and wireless audio equipment. SubZero products are primarily used in entry-level and intermediate contexts, including by musicians, producers, and live performers.

== History ==
SubZero is a proprietary brand owned by Gear4music, a UK-based retailer of musical instruments and audio equipment. Gear4music launched its e-commerce platform in 2003, having operated as a studio and equipment supplier since the mid-1990s. Over time, the company introduced several in-house brands, with SubZero becoming its primary label for audio and live sound products.

Initially, the brand also encompassed instruments and guitar amplifiers, but these product lines were later rebranded under other Gear4music-owned labels such as Hartwood and Gear4music.

SubZero equipment has received coverage in industry publications. In 2017, Sound On Sound described the SZPA-L68 as a “mini line-array” system that is “highly portable” with “impressive clarity for the price.” Reviews in MusicRadar have similarly noted the practicality and durability of various SubZero products, particularly within their price range.

== Products ==
SubZero manufactures a range of audio and live sound equipment, broadly covering microphones, studio gear, wireless systems, and PA solutions. The brand’s products fall within the entry-level to mid-range market and are distributed through Gear4music.

=== Microphones ===
SubZero produces microphones designed for both live and studio applications. The range includes dynamic microphones for stage performance, as well as condenser microphones intended for studio recording. USB-equipped condenser microphones are also part of the catalogue, aimed at podcasters, content creators, and home recording setups.

=== Studio Equipment ===
The studio category has included MIDI controllers, audio interfaces, mixers, and monitor speakers. MIDI controllers provide integration with digital audio workstations, while audio interfaces and mixers support multi-channel recording and playback for home and project studios. Studio monitors are offered as for mixing and general music production.

=== Wireless Systems ===
SubZero’s wireless systems cover handheld microphones, guitar and instrument transmitters, and in-ear monitoring solutions. These are designed for live performers and rehearsal spaces seeking cable-free setups. Wireless vocal microphones are intended to provide mobility on stage, while instrument systems allow guitarists and other amplified players to perform without physical connections. In-ear monitoring systems provide an alternative to traditional stage monitors and are commonly used in smaller-scale setups. The SubZero Rogue VI baritone guitar has been documented in Guitar World coverage of the band Loathe, who featured it in playthrough and feature articles.

=== Live Sound Equipment ===
The brand’s live sound range includes PA speakers, subwoofers, power amplifiers, and DJ mixers. Active PA speakers and powered subwoofers are marketed towards small venues, mobile performers, and DJs, providing portable reinforcement systems with varying power ratings. Power amplifiers are offered for integration with passive speaker setups, while DJ mixers and compact mixing consoles cover entry-level and small-event use. Reviews and user feedback have noted that some SubZero PA products are suited to musicians and venues requiring compact live sound reinforcement, particularly where portability and simplified setup are important.

== Reception ==
SubZero products have been reviewed in specialist music and audio publications. Coverage has described the brand as offering equipment at lower price points compared with established manufacturers. Reviews have noted the accessibility of the products, particularly for beginners, hobbyists, and semi-professional users. Some commentary has noted trade-offs in build quality or advanced features relative to higher-priced alternatives, but reviews have also described SubZero as offering entry-level equipment at lower price points for live sound and recording.
