= Premier Percussion =

English musical instrument manufacturer

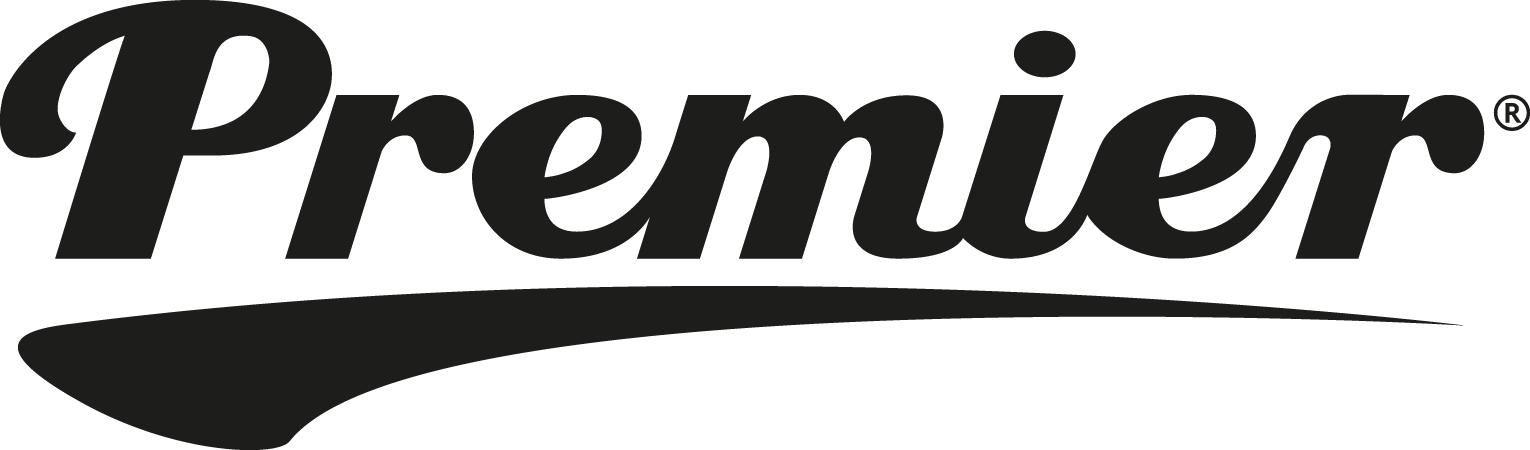
- Industry: Musical instruments
- Founded: 1922; 104 years ago
- Founder: Albert Della Porta and George Smith
- Headquarters: Holgate, York, England
- Area served: Worldwide
- Products: Drum kits
- Website: premier-percussion.com

Premier Percussion (commonly known as Premier Drums) is a British brand specialising in drum kits, snare drums and percussion instruments. Founded in London in 1922 by Albert Della Porta and George Smith and initially producing instruments for other companies, Premier quickly established itself as a leading name in percussion with its own ranges of drums and orchestral products.

In 2021, Premier was acquired by the UK-based retailer Gear4music. Following the acquisition, the brand introduced several new product ranges, including a Centenary line launched to commemorate its 100th anniversary.

Premier kits and snares have been used by high-profile drummers including Ringo Starr (The Beatles), Keith Moon (The Who), Matt Helders (Arctic Monkeys), Mitch Mitchell (The Jimi Hendrix Experience), and others.

== History ==
Premier was founded in October 1922 by Albert Della Porta and George Smith in London’s West End. Initially operating from a basement workshop in Berwick Street, Soho, the company began by repairing and manufacturing drums for other firms. Albert's brother Fred soon joined, managing sales and administration. By 1925, Premier had introduced its own branded products and expanded to a larger factory in Silex Street, South London.

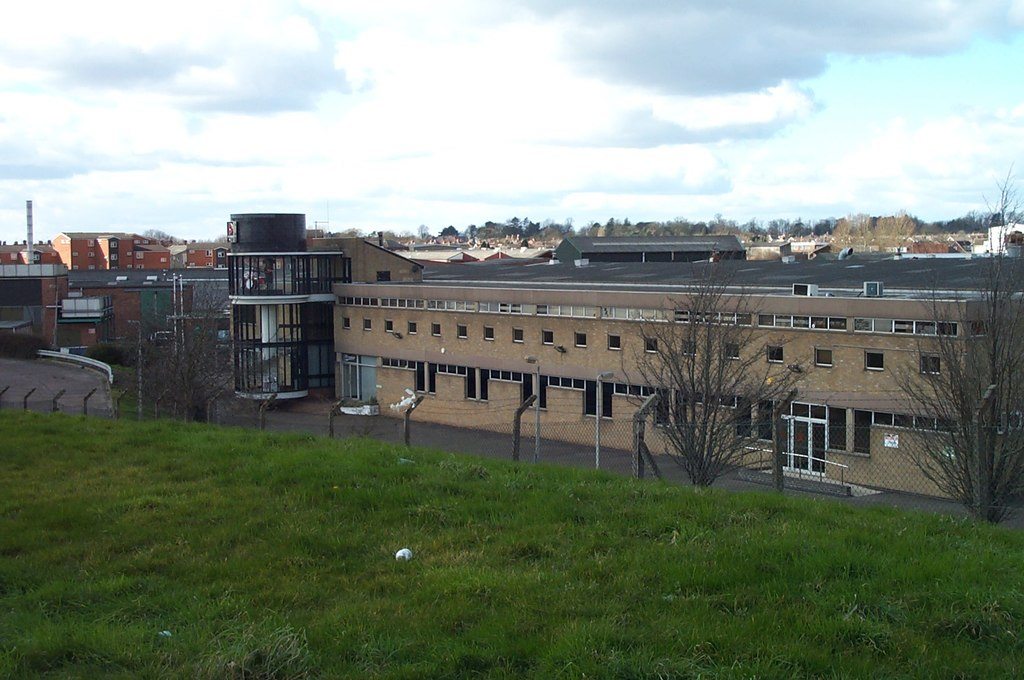
=== Premier Percussion, South Wigston (2005) ===

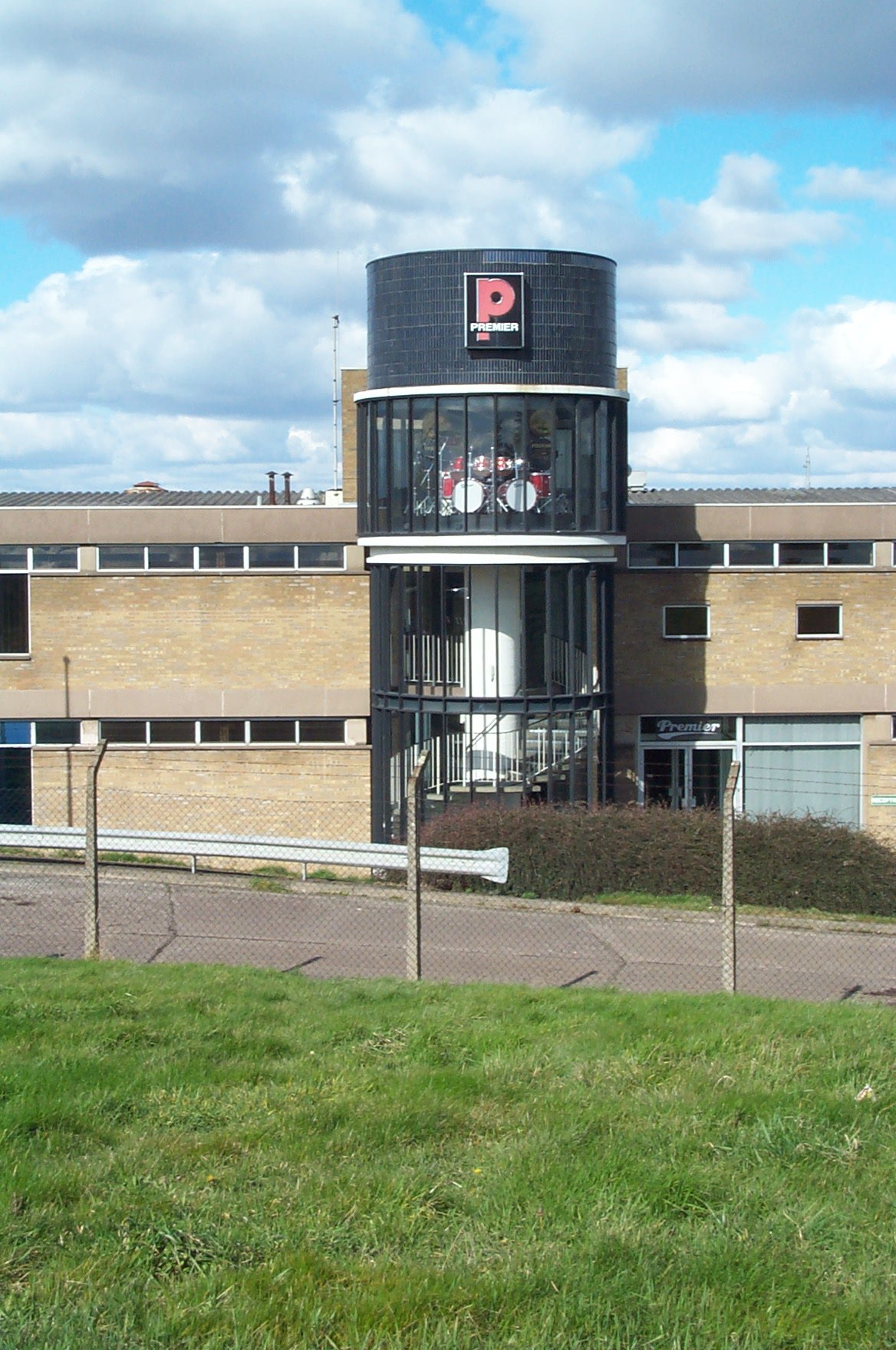
=== Premier Percussion (2005) ===

In the 1920s and 1930s, Premier developed a full range of percussion instruments, including snare drums, timpani, xylophones and drum kits for dance bands and theatres. The company also entered the military market with side and bass drums for pipe and regimental bands. Premier was known for its distinctive finishes and trap console hardware, and its early adoption of chromium plating. By 1937, it had launched its Olympic line as a budget alternative.

During the Second World War, Premier’s factory in Park Royal was destroyed in the Blitz. The company pivoted to war production, making parts for radar and anti-tank weaponry, and relocated to Wigston, near Leicester, where it remained post-war.

The post-war period saw Premier rebuild its percussion line with innovations in drum shell hardware and die-moulded components. Under the leadership of Albert’s sons (Clifford and Raymond Della Porta), Premier became one of the most technically advanced drum manufacturers in the world, exporting widely and receiving the Queen’s Award to Industry for exports in 1966.

Following several decades of growth, the company underwent multiple ownership changes from the 1980s onwards. The brand relaunched in 2022 and introduced a range of Centenary products to celebrate its 100th anniversary.

== Drum Lines ==
=== Early Drum Kits and Outfits (1920s – 1930s) ===
Premier's early drum kits, referred to as "Combination Outfits," were developed during the 1920s for use in dance halls, theaters, and cinemas. These sets typically featured a bass drum outfitted with traps, a snare drum, temple blocks, and cymbals mounted on a rolling console. Early Premier kits often included telescopic bass drum pedals and hand-tuned tom-toms, designed for the needs of silent film accompanists and vaudeville performers.

By the mid-1920s, the company was producing fully branded kits under the Premier name, having transitioned from supplying other firms. Premier’s catalogues from this era show an increasing standardisation of configurations, including features like factory-painted bass drum heads and matching snares. These were marketed toward both professional drummers and export buyers, reflecting the company's early ambition to reach global markets.

Premier's aesthetic designs became distinctive during this period, offering decorative finishes such as ebony or ivory veneers and the use of chromium plating, which was a modern innovation at the time. Traps and rack-based setups, such as the Swingster and Gigster consoles, were also developed, offering a practical and visually striking setup for performing drummers.

=== Military and Regimental Drums (1920s – 1940s) ===
Alongside its dance and theater kits, Premier produced a broad range of military and regimental drums during the interwar period. These included rope-tension and rod-tension side drums, tenor drums, and bass drums, many of which featured decorative painted crests and regimental insignia. These instruments were used by British and Commonwealth regiments, as well as in school cadet bands.

Premier’s military drums were constructed with durability and visibility in mind, employing deep wooden shells, calfskin heads, and traditional rope lugs with leather ears. The company's early catalogues showcased these instruments as both ceremonial and functional tools, suited for parades and formal occasions. These models also formed part of Premier's growing export offer, particularly to territories with British military influence.

These regimental drums remained in production throughout the 1930s and into the wartime period, forming an essential part of Premier’s identity as a full-spectrum percussion manufacturer.

=== Olympic (1937) ===
Premier launched its Olympic brand in 1937 as a lower-cost alternative to its main drum line. Designed for students, schools, and budget-conscious drummers, early Olympic kits shared the same shell construction as Premier’s professional models but featured simplified hardware and fewer cosmetic refinements. These included triple-flanged hoops, six-lug bass drums, and single or double-headed toms.

Production of Olympic drums was suspended during the Second World War, but resumed in the late 1940s and continued through the 1970s. During this period, Olympic kits gained a reputation for quality and value, often serving as a first kit for future professionals. Notable users included Bill Bruford (Yes), Larry Mullen Jr. (U2), and Paul Thompson (Roxy Music).

In the 1990s, Premier revived the Olympic name for a new series of entry-level drums manufactured in Asia. These models, inspired by the Pearl Export format, retained some distinctive Premier design elements but were positioned firmly in the student market. Despite the offshore production, the Olympic line remained part of Premier's broader brand ecosystem until it was eventually phased out.

=== Standardised Outfit Naming (Late 1940s) ===
Following the Second World War, Premier introduced a standardised system for naming its drum outfits, aligning with a broader post-war drive toward factory efficiency and product consistency. Model names such as Outfit No. 21, 25, and 50 became common in Premier catalogues, each representing specific configurations of bass drum, toms, and snare.

This period also marked a design shift toward full-shell matching, with snares finished to complement the bass and toms. The popular Outfit 54, for example, included a Super Ace snare and became a default four-piece kit for many British drummers during the late 1940s and 1950s.

The move to standardisation coincided with Premier's adoption of die-cast manufacturing processes that had been developed during wartime production. These allowed the company to produce consistent hardware components such as flush-braced lugs, cast hoops, and folding stands, contributing to a recognisable post-war Premier identity.

=== Post-War Growth and International Recognition (1950s–1960s) ===
In the 1950s and 1960s, Premier solidified its reputation as a leading British drum manufacturer through a growing range of drum kits tailored for professional, orchestral, and emerging rock players. A defining innovation was the introduction of the flush-braced long lug in 1947, which appeared across Premier's drum lines and became a core design element into the following decades.

One of the most recognisable configurations of the time was the Outfit 54, a four-piece set consisting of a 22"x14" bass drum, 12"x8" and 16"x16" toms, and the Super Ace snare drum. The kit was typically fitted with Everplay plastic heads, Premier’s in-house alternative to calfskin, and showcased Premier’s distinctive chrome hardware and wrap finishes.

These years also saw the company offering complete ranges of orchestral, marching, and dance band kits. In addition to producing its own drumheads, Premier manufactured cymbals under the Zyn, Super Zyn and 5 Star Super Zyn names to complement its drum sets. These were included with several kits aimed at school and military bands as well as semi-professional players.

By the 1960s, Premier kits were used by many high-profile artists, including Ringo Starr, Nick Mason, Mitch Mitchell, and Keith Moon. Custom configurations and unique finishes became more common, including kits built for touring musicians. These artist associations reinforced Premier’s position as a versatile and export-ready drum brand.

=== Resonator (1970s) ===
Premier’s Resonator series, introduced in the 1970s, featured a distinctive twin-shell construction designed to enhance projection and eliminate interference from mounting hardware. Each drum contained a thin inner “resonator” shell, suspended within a standard outer shell by an air gap, with all lugs and fittings attached only to the outer shell. This design allowed the inner surface to remain smooth and uninterrupted, effectively creating a resonant chamber.

The design was originally conceived by Staffordshire drum builder Alan Gilby in 1972. Gilby first applied the concept to a Ludwig snare owned by jazz drummer Kenny Clare, who then collaborated with Premier to develop the production model. The company subsequently licensed the idea and paid royalties to Clare and Gilby for each Kenny Clare Resonator snare drum sold.

The Resonator line became popular among professional players in the 1970s and 1980s, particularly in live performance contexts where its enhanced projection was beneficial. A limited-edition black-lacquered version, known as the Black Shadow, was produced during this period and has since become a collectible variant of the line.

While the series was eventually discontinued, its engineering approach influenced future drum design and remains associated with Premier’s period of technical innovation.

=== Projector (late 1970s) ===
Premier introduced the Projector series in the late 1970s as a mid-range alternative to the flagship Resonator line. Designed for gigging musicians and semi-professional players, Projector kits featured robust construction and straightforward hardware, offering durability without the acoustic complexity of the double-shell design found in the Resonators.

The Projector series utilised birch shells with standard reinforcement rings and Premier’s classic flush-braced lugs. Kits were available in standard four- and five-piece configurations and came finished in a range of wrap and lacquer options. These drums were known for their solid tone, especially in live settings, where their focused projection and reliability made them a popular choice for touring bands.

While the Projector lacked the high-end appeal of Premier’s top-tier offerings, it became a dependable and widely adopted line during the late 1970s and early 1980s. The series contributed to Premier's continued visibility among working musicians and schools, balancing affordability with professional-level features.

=== Royale and Crown (1982–1988) ===
The Royale and Crown series were launched by Premier in the 1980s as successors to the Olympic range, targeting entry-level and intermediate drummers. These kits retained many of the visual features associated with Premier’s higher-end lines but used more cost-effective materials and simplified hardware. Both lines featured standard six or eight-lug configurations on bass drums and toms.

The Royale series was aimed at beginners and schools, while the Crown range offered slightly upgraded components and finishes, serving as a stepping stone for students progressing to semi-professional use. Both lines were produced in the UK and retained Premier’s manufacturing standards, offering an accessible option for drummers seeking a British-made kit without the premium pricing of the Resonator or Projector series.

Though not marketed as professional kits, Royale and Crown sets became widely used in educational settings and home practice studios, contributing to Premier’s continued visibility in the mass market during the 1980s.

=== APK and XPK (1985–1999) ===
Premier introduced the APK and XPK series in the mid-1980s to address the growing demand for mass-market drum kits suitable for students, schools, and semi-professional players. These lines offered updated styling and manufacturing efficiencies while maintaining the core visual identity of Premier drums.

The XPK, marketed as a step up from APK, utilised an outer ply of higher-grade birch. Both lines were available in a wide range of configurations and finishes, including lacquered and wrapped options. Hardware was kept simple but reliable, using low-mass lugs and basic tom mounts.

The XPK, in particular, gained popularity in schools and recording studios due to its improved shell construction and balanced sound profile. While not considered high-end kits, both APK and XPK played a crucial role in maintaining Premier's brand presence during the late 1980s and 1990s, particularly as competition from Asian manufacturers intensified.

=== Signia (1992) ===
Launched in 1992, the Signia series was Premier’s first full maple drum line, notable for its undersized shell diameters designed to enhance resonance. The 5mm maple shells featured beech reinforcement rings and were joined using scarf joints, a method typically found in acoustic instrument making, to improve structural integrity. Developed by Premier’s in-house team, this construction aimed to maximise tonal clarity, sustain, and projection.

The Signia series was fitted with precision-engineered hardware, lugs, triple-flanged hoops and tube brackets. Attention to finish quality was central to the line, with deep gloss lacquers and premium wood veneers offered as standard. The Signia quickly became popular among touring and session musicians, valued for both its aesthetics and performance.

Premier also introduced a companion line, Signia Marquis, which retained much of the same build quality but with alternative component choices such as die cast hoops and unsupported shells. Together, these models marked Premier’s most significant professional offering of the 1990s, reinforcing its competitiveness in the high-end market during a time of strong international rivalry.

=== Genista (1994) ===
Premier introduced the Genista series in 1994 as its first unsupported birch shell kit. The original Genista kits were constructed from 100% Scandinavian birch, delivering a focused tone with strong attack and clarity, characteristics particularly favoured in live settings. They featured distinctive lugs, precision-engineered hardware, and a variety of high-gloss finishes.

In 2022, Premier reimagined the Genista range as part of its centenary celebrations, offering three sub-lines: Genista Classic, Genista Heritage, and Genista Maple. These modern editions retained many of the original core features of Genista, updating the aesthetic and hardware options for contemporary drummers while drawing heavily on the original’s design DNA.

=== Centenary Models (2022) ===
To commemorate its 100th anniversary in 2022, Premier launched several centenary products. The range included two key models: the Genista 100SE and the Della-Porta 100. The latter was UK-built, with both featuring high-spec materials, bespoke hardware and unique finishes referencing Premier’s legacy.

The Genista 100SE was a special edition of the classic Genista line, built from premium American birch shells, 7-ply for toms and snares (5.6mm thick) and 9-ply for the bass drum (7.2mm). The toms retained Premier’s historic 6mm undersized shell diameters for improved tuning and resonance. Additional features included 45-degree bearing edges, low-profile ISO mounting systems, triple-flange hoops, and retooled tension lugs based on original Genista castings. The set was finished in a tri-band lacquer and fitted with original “P” badge plinths.

The Della-Porta 100 was a UK-built, limited-run walnut snare drum named after Premier’s founder, Albert Della Porta. Each drum featured a 5mm, 4-ply walnut shell with 6mm beech reinforcement rings, constructed using traditional rolled and lapped scarf joints. A 30-degree round-over bearing edge and single-flange steel hoops with vintage claw hooks completed the design. The drum was fitted with Premier’s 610 snare mechanism and custom Evans/Calftone centenary heads. Each unit came with a numbered certificate of authenticity and a matching UK-made hard case.

=== Elite, Genista, Artist and Revolution (2022-Present) ===
Following the 2021 acquisition by Gear4music, Premier restructured its acoustic drum range into four distinct tiers to serve different segments of the market. The top-tier Elite line is targeted at professional touring and studio musicians, offering high-grade shells and detailed finishes. Genista occupies the upper-mid level, preserving its legacy as a premium birch line with modern refinements.

The Artist series is aimed at intermediate players, offering performance-grade kits with accessible pricing. Revolution, designed as an entry-level offering, includes cymbals and hardware to provide a complete setup for beginners and educational use. All four lines reflect Premier’s continued commitment to UK-led design and broad global distribution.

== Snare Drums ==
=== Early Professional Snare Drums (1920s–1930s) ===
Premier’s earliest professional snare drums were developed for theatre and orchestral players. By the mid-1920s, the company was producing its own branded models, including the Premier Deluxe and Popular lines, which featured metal or wooden shells with internal dampening systems and engraved finishes. Snares from this era were available in ebony, ivory, and porcelain coatings, and were equipped with hand-tensioned hoops and throw-offs.

=== Regimental and Military Snares (1920s–1940s) ===
Premier also produced a wide range of rope-tension and rod-tension military snares, used by school cadet bands and British regiments. These drums featured decorative regimental crest art, deep wooden shells, and traditional leather-tensioned ropework. They were designed for durability and ceremonial use, forming part of Premier’s broader military and orchestral offerings.

=== Royal Ace & Super Ace (1950s) ===
The Royal Ace and Super Ace models introduced in the 1950s became popular among orchestral, military, and jazz players. Built with birch shells and flush-braced lugs, these snares incorporated parallel snare mechanisms that allowed for even snare tension across the head. The Super Ace, in particular, became the standard snare in Premier’s Outfit 54 kit.

=== Premier 2000 (1960s) ===
Premier's model 2000 snare drum, introduced in the 1960s, became one of the company's most recognisable and widely used models. It featured an aluminium shell with a bright, articulate tone, and employed the proprietary Flobeam parallel action snare mechanism. This design allowed for precise, even snare contact and was favoured across genres including jazz, rock, and marching band settings.

=== HR9 (Heavy Rock 9) (1987) ===
The HR9, introduced in 1987, was designed specifically for hard rock and metal drumming. It featured a deep hybrid shell made from a brass and wood combination, with a wide diameter and stress-ring tensioning system for maximum durability and projection. The HR9 delivered a loud, punchy tone suited to high-volume live performance.

=== Modern Classic (2001) ===
Premier’s Modern Classic, launched in the early 2000s, combined vintage aesthetics with modern functionality. It was co-developed with Steve White and featured birch/mahogany shells with rounded bearing edges. The snare offered a dry, warm tone ideal for studio work and was part of a broader shift toward hybrid-shelled, retro-inspired drums.

=== The B.E.A.S.T (2015) ===
The B.E.A.S.T was introduced in 2015 as a high-output snare drum featuring a solid oak shell and Premier’s 610 snare mechanism. Co-developed with Keith Keough, the snare was designed for powerful projection and presence, it included a natural oil finish and machined hardware for a raw aesthetic. The drum received positive attention for its striking appearance.

=== Della-Porta 100 (2022) ===
Released as part of the centenary celebrations, the Della-Porta 100 snare drum was named in honour of Premier’s founder. Built in the UK, it features a walnut shell with beech reinforcement rings and a satin finish. The drum delivers a dry, focused tone with strong sensitivity, and was produced in a limited run of 100 models.

== Hardware ==
=== Early Pedal and Trap Designs (1920s–1930s) ===
Premier’s earliest hardware innovations were developed during the silent film and vaudeville era. Drum kits from the 1920s often included trap trays, temple blocks, and telescopic bass drum pedals. These were designed for theatre percussionists and featured collapsible mechanisms for portability. Early models like the Swingster and Gigster trap consoles offered mobile, steel-framed platforms for mounting multiple percussion accessories.

=== Swingster and Gigster Consoles (1930s) ===
The Swingster and Gigster consoles were mobile trap setups that allowed drummers to mount temple blocks, cymbals, toms, and snares on a single frame. Constructed from stainless steel, these were among the first integrated percussion racks in British drum manufacturing. American bandleader Chick Webb was famously photographed with a Premier Swingster, showcasing its use in jazz big bands.

=== Wonder Finishes and Crystalflash Wraps (1930s) ===
Premier distinguished itself through decorative finishes in the 1930s, including Wonder Finishes such as Crystalflash, Glittergold, Pearlex, Raytex, and Blueflash. These wrap options were paired with chrome hardware and flush fittings, creating visually distinctive kits that were highly regarded in the pre-war British drum scene.

=== Long lug design (1947) ===
The introduction of Premier’s flush-braced long lug in 1947 marked a turning point in British drum hardware. Designed as a single-piece die-cast fitting connecting top and bottom tension rods, the lug reduced shell stress and improved tuning consistency. Its streamlined, sculptural shape became a defining feature of Premier kits for decades.

=== Flush base stands (1950s) ===
In the 1950s, Premier developed fold-flat tripod stands using die-moulded cast legs. These lightweight, portable designs became standard for school kits and marching setups, and were praised for their transport efficiency and reliability in live settings.

=== Lokfast and Trilok hardware (1968-1970s) ===
Premier introduced the Lokfast series in 1968, marking a significant evolution from the flush-base stands of the 1950s. Lokfast hardware retained the flat-based design but introduced more substantial oval-section bottom tubes for increased stability. Snare stands featured swivel arm cradles, and the hi-hat stand incorporated a centre-pull system with screw spurs on the front legs.

By the mid-1970s, Lokfast was succeeded by Trilok hardware, which featured tripod bases with U-shaped legs and nylon inserts to reduce wear. The hi-hat stand in this range included external expansion springs and the 252-style footplate, while cymbal stands introduced integrated boom arms for the first time. Subsequent lines included Tristar, with double-braced tripod legs, and Trident, a single-braced alternative.

=== Bass Drum Pedals (1960s–1970s) ===
During the 1960s and 1970s, Premier developed a series of rugged bass drum pedals, including the 250S and 252. These models featured moulded rubber footplates and chain-drive mechanisms, offering durability and consistent response. The 250 pedal became particularly well-known for its distinctively smooth action and heavy-duty construction.

=== Premier Cymbals: Zyn, Super Zyn & Krut (1950s–1970s) ===
Due to limited availability of imported cymbals, Premier began producing its own lines: Zyn (nickel-silver alloy), Super Zyn (B20 bronze), and Krut, a value-oriented line for export. These cymbals were widely included with Premier kits and offered accessible options for students and marching bands. The Super Zyn became particularly well-regarded among British jazz and military drummers.

=== In-house manufacturing and plating ===
Premier maintained full in-house control over its production for most of the 20th century. This included shell construction, chrome plating, die-casting of lugs and hoops, cymbal manufacture, and drumhead production. This vertical integration gave Premier a reputation for durability and consistent quality compared to competitors that outsourced components.

== Ownership ==
=== Family Ownership (1922–1983) ===
Premier was founded in 1922 by Albert Della Porta and George Smith. Albert’s brother Fred Della Porta joined shortly thereafter, establishing what would become a family-led company for over six decades. By the 1960s and 70s, Premier operated from a 100,000 sq ft facility in South Wigston, employing more than 450 staff and exporting to over 120 countries. The company earned the Queen’s Award to Industry in 1966.

However, financial pressures mounted in the early 1980s. In 1984, Premier entered receivership. The company was subsequently rescued by a consortium led by the Royal Bank of Scotland.

=== Management Buyout (1984–1987) ===
In the wake of the family’s exit, Premier underwent a management buyout and was restructured as Premier Percussion Ltd. This period marked efforts to modernise and stabilise the company’s finances, but challenges from global competition persisted.

=== Yamaha Ownership (1987–1992) ===
In 1987, Premier merged with Yamaha Corporation. The partnership led to the adoption of Yamaha’s air-seal shell production techniques at the South Wigston site, where Yamaha’s Power V kits were also manufactured for European distribution. Despite the collaboration, Premier eventually bought itself out of the agreement in 1992 and returned to full British ownership.

=== Verity Group Ownership (1992–1999) ===
Following several transitional years, Premier was acquired by the Verity Group in 1995. The company benefited from fresh investment, resulting in the development of professional drum lines such as the Signia and Genista. However, Verity later withdrew from musical instrument manufacturing, prompting another change of ownership.

=== Interim Ownership and Decline (1999–2007) ===
After Verity’s divestment, Premier changed hands multiple times. The company ceased drumset manufacturing at South Wigston in 2007, closing its historic factory after 85 years of operation. Ownership passed to Ken Tonkin who relocated Premier to Kibworth and attempted to revive its product portfolio.

=== Premier Music International Ltd (2007–2015) ===
Premier Music International Ltd was incorporated to lead the brand into a new phase. In 2011, Premier acquired boutique manufacturer KD Drums and appointed founder Keith Keough as Head of Manufacturing and Design. Under his direction, Premier launched a range of high-end UK-made drums, including The B.E.A.S.T and the Modern Classic.

However, Keough departed the company in 2015 to co-found the British Drum Company. This marked a turning point, and Premier’s operations began to contract.

=== Uncertainty and Dormancy (2015–2021) ===
By 2015, Premier was experiencing significant uncertainty. Reports noted that its Stockport office had closed, artist endorsements were withdrawn, and its US distribution deal with Hanser Music Group had ended.

In 2017, the demolition of the original South Wigston factory underscored the brand’s diminishing presence in British drum manufacturing.

=== Gear4music (2021–Present) ===
In July 2021, Premier was acquired by Gear4music, a UK-based retailer of musical instruments. The acquisition included Premier’s brand and intellectual property. Under Gear4music, Premier relaunched the brand’s product range in 2022, introducing updated lines such as Genista, Elite, Artist and Revolution, alongside limited-edition Centenary models.

== Notable Artists ==
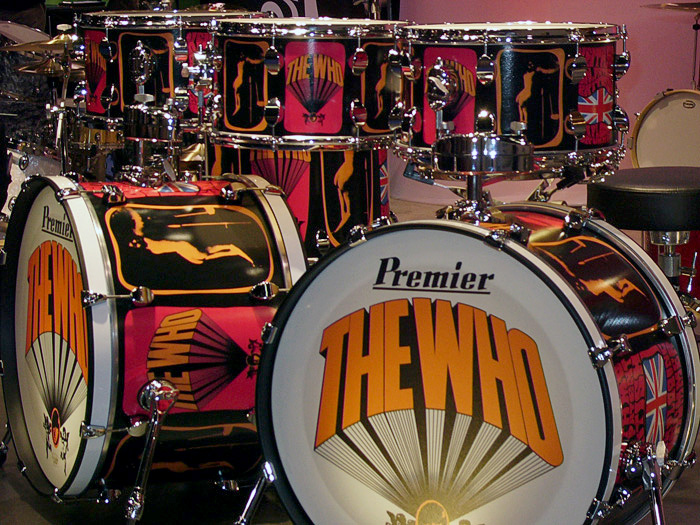
Premier's replica of the classic "Pictures of Lily" Keith Moon's drumkit

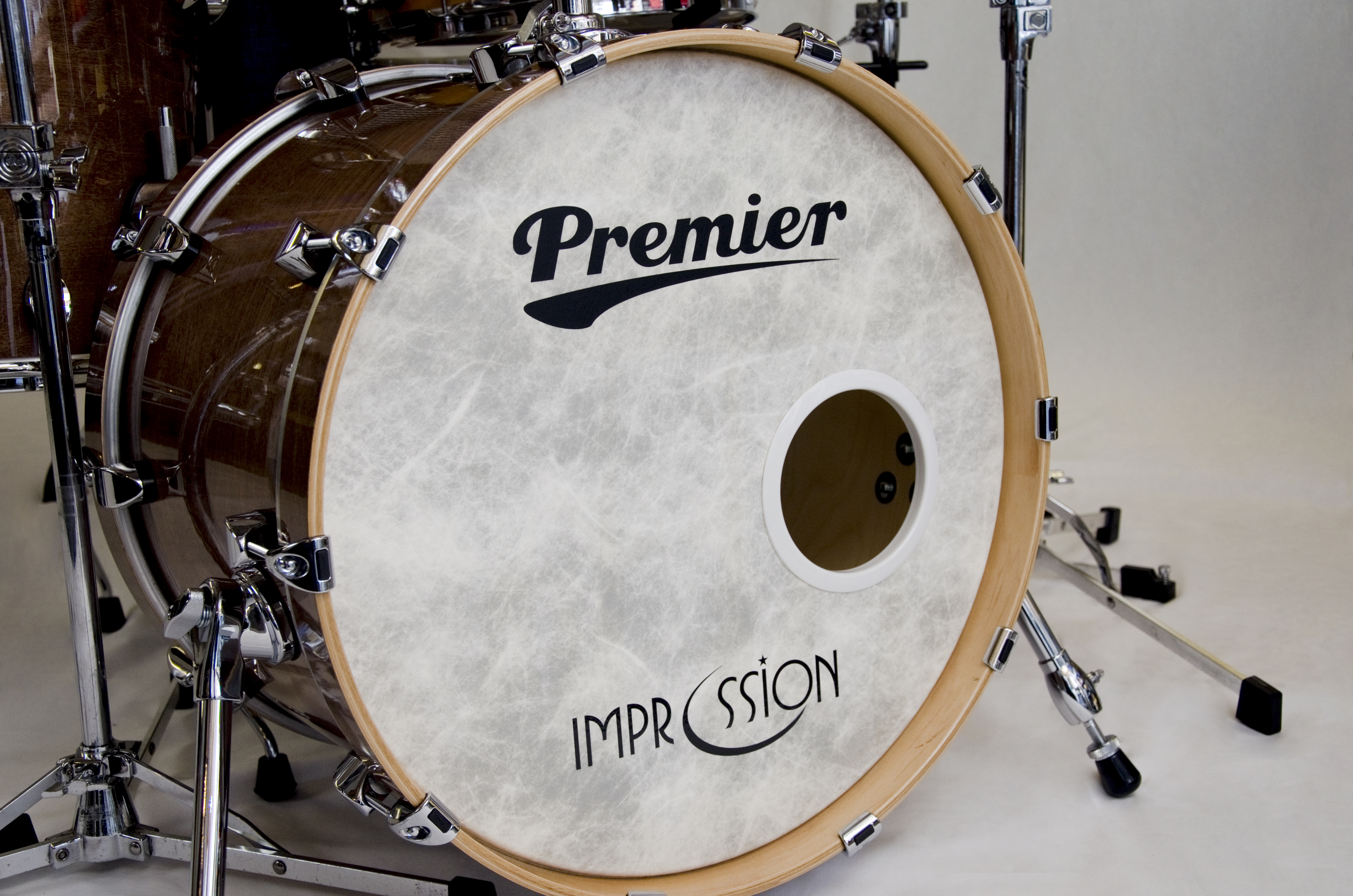
Premier Impression bass drum

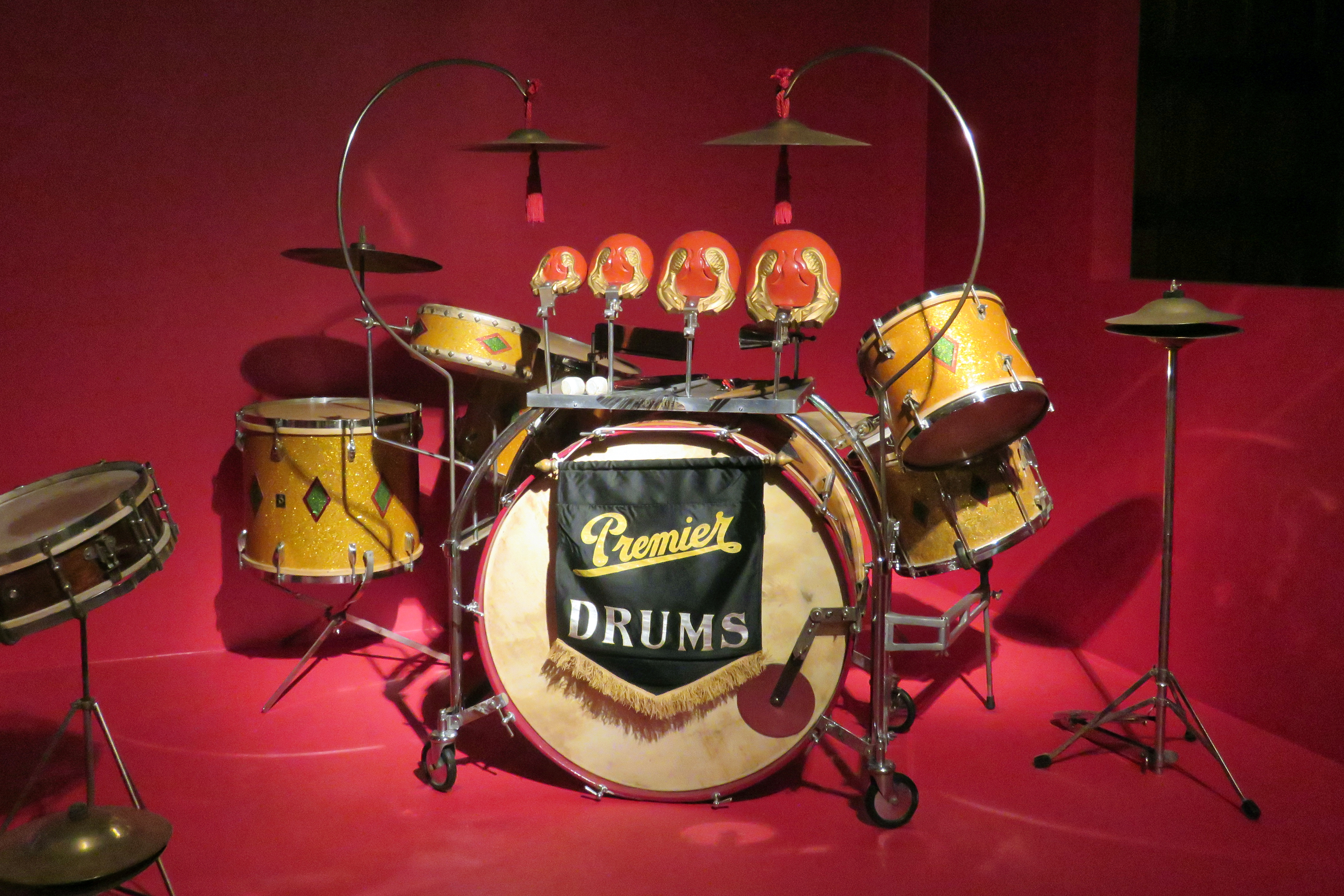
Premier 1920s 'jazz' drum kit

- Ringo Starr – The Beatles
- Nicholas 'Nick' Barker – Ancient, Borstal, Brujeria, Cradle of Filth, Dimmu Borgir, Liquid Graveyard, Lock Up, Monolith, Noctis Imperium, Obskkvlt, Old Man's Child, Shining, Twilight of the God, Winter's Thrall
- Johnny Blitz – Dead Boys
- Julien Brown – Massive Attack
- Rick Buckler – The Jam
- Clem Burke – Blondie
- Phil Collins – Genesis
- Bobby Colomby – Blood, Sweat & Tears
- Eric Delaney
- Bobby Elliott – The Hollies
- Ginger Fish – Marilyn Manson, Rob Zombie
- Philly Joe Jones
- Rufus "Speedy" Jones
- Nick Mason – Pink Floyd
- Nicko McBrain – Iron Maiden
- Mitch Mitchell – The Jimi Hendrix Experience
- Keith Moon – The Who
- Jerry Nolan – The Heartbreakers
- Hunt Sales – Iggy Pop
- Philip Selway – Radiohead
- Chris Sharrock
- Ronnie Verrell
- Brad Wilk – Rage Against the Machine
- Sam Woodyard – Duke Ellington
- John Maher – Buzzcocks
