= Lindsay McKenzie =

Scottish Actress

- Born: Lindsay McKenzie; 28 June 1985 (age 41); Kilmarnock, Scotland
- Education: Liverpool Institute for Performing Arts

Lindsay McKenzie (born 28 June 1985) is a Scottish actress who starred in BBC One children's show, Raven: The Island, playing the part of Princess Erina. She attended Kilmarnock Academy and then went to study acting at Liverpool Institute for Performing Arts (LIPA).

== Princess Erina ==
Lindsay McKenzie's most notable role to date is as Princess Erina in CBBC's Raven: The Island, a 20-episode prime-time BBC One series. In the show, she portrays a princess who has lost her island, Alanus, to demonic forces and is determined to reclaim it. While her close friend Raven is in exile, Erina is forced to hide in the most secluded parts of the island, accompanied by her sprite companion, Haryad.

McKenzie's co-stars, James Mackenzie (Raven) and Michael MacKenzie (Cyrus) are not related to her.

== Career ==
Lindsay has gone on to do stand-up comedy, opening for Billy Kirkwood at the Glasgow International Comedy Festival, and can be seen as a regular doing Improv at The Stand Comedy Club in Glasgow alongside Neil Bratchpiece, MC Hammersmith (Will Nameh), Billy Kirkwood & Gary Dobson.

She also produced "Single as F@ck!", a triple bill line up, which sold out at the Glasgow International Comedy Festival 2024 and also ran at the Edinburgh Festival Fringe 2024.

== Filmography ==
=== Television ===
- Raven: The Island (2006)
