= Raven: The Secret Temple =

Television game show series

- Genre: Children's; Game Show
- Starring: James Mackenzie; Tara Sharma
- Theme music composer: David Brockett
- Country of origin: United Kingdom
- Original language: English
- No. of seasons: 1
- No. of episodes: 20

Production
- Production location: India

Original release
- Network: BBC
- Release: 6 August – 31 August 2007

Raven: The Secret Temple is a BBC Scotland children's adventure game show, and the second spin-off to the main series, Raven. It comprises one series, which aired first on the CBBC Channel, and then during CBBC on BBC One in the United Kingdom, in 2007. In this series, warriors compete as teams and attempt to collect as many jewels as possible by completing fourteen tasks, so that they may find and enter the Secret Temple.

== Production ==
The series was commissioned by the BBC Scotland Children's Department and filmed in India.

== Plot ==
For more information of the plot arc over the course of the series, see Challenges.

After his homeland is held frozen captive under the icy grip of his enemy Nevar, Raven travels to an Eastern land with 16 of his young warriors in the hopes of finding the Secret Temple. Within the temple lies the elixir that will restore his homeland to its former glory and release his land from Nevar's spell. In the East, he finds an ally in Satyarani, who will guide Raven and his warriors to the temple, but only if they prove their worthiness by completing fourteen perilous tasks; only the strongest warrior will be able to enter the temple and retrieve the elixir from within. Unfortunately, Nevar and his demons have followed Raven and his warriors, determined to stop them from completing their quest at any cost.

== Format ==
Similar to Raven, the series features a set of challenges that warriors must undertake. The sixteen warriors being whittled down over time as warriors are lost during each challenge. However, in contrast, the warriors are split into teams of four, each under a different standard and different colour of clothing: the Panthers (purple), the Eagles (red), the Wolves (orange) and the Tigers (yellow). Each has a team leader, which was decided initially by two challenges for each team, the winner would become the leader. Each day, the teams complete (separately) one of the fourteen different challenges in an attempt to collect jewels, which may be used to bring a team member back should they be eliminated.

In further contrast to the main Raven series, there are no lives for each warrior. If a warrior is lost during a challenge, for instance, running out of time in a timed game, the warrior is eliminated. Satyarani, who governs the rules of the challenges, decrees that a warrior may be brought back in exchange for eight jewels should the team choose to do so. However, this may only occur once for each warrior. Should a warrior be eliminated twice, they may not be brought back, regardless of whether the team has enough jewels to do so.

== Characters ==
Raven (James Mackenzie): Raven returns in this series, travelling to a distant Eastern land to guide the sixteen warriors through their quest to discover the Secret Temple and find the sacred elixir within that will restore his homeland. He must also ensure their safety by battling Nevar and the demons he has brought with him.

Nevar (in this series, Nageswara Rao): After freezing Raven's homeland, the mysterious cloaked, dark figure follows Raven to the Eastern land to attempt to stop his warriors from completing their quest, commanding an army of demons and using an all-seeing eye, a dish of water through which he can spy on Raven and his warriors as they complete their quest. He is referred to as the Dark One by Satyarani.

Satyarani (Tara Sharma): Satyarani is a friend and ally of Raven's. A princess, fashioned from the earth itself and with the ability to transport herself through the air in the form of a dust cloud, she inhabits the Eastern land and guides the warriors through challenges, helping Raven on the journey to the Secret Temple. Perhaps less compassionate, and more doubting than Raven about his warriors, she often visits them at the start and the end of the day to question them about the choices they have made.

== Warriors ==
Sixteen warriors started the quest, with four to each team; the leader for each team was decided on the first day through two trials. As with the main Raven series, each warrior is given their own warrior name, comprising a mix of letters from the first name and surname. Each team has distinct colours reflected in their standards and their Eastern-inspired outfits.

The teams and warriors are listed below, with yellow cells indicating the warrior went through to the finals. The warrior in gold indicates the winner, silver for second place and bronze for third.

Panthers	Warrior Name	Real Name	Elimination 1	Elimination 2	Result
Panthers	Sonro (L1)***	Rob McPherson	Field of the Dead		1st
Panthers	Arton	Jonathan Strachan	Obelisks of the Sun	Chariots	13th
Panthers	Aksu (L2)	Supriya Chak	The Gulley +		9th
Panthers	Yonra	Robyn Leonard	Temple Spirit Run	The Gulley +	7th

Eagles	Warrior Name	Real Name	Elimination 1	Elimination 2	Result
Eagles	Yeada (L)	Thea Day	Stepping Stones	Snakes and Ladders +	6th
Eagles	Taylan	Angus Taylor	Thrall Threads	Snake Charmer +	5th
Eagles	Karja	Janhvi Devalekar	The Way of the Dead +		4th
Eagles	Samra	Raghav Rayasam	Stepping Stones **		12th

Wolves	Warrior Name	Real Name	Elimination 1	Elimination 2	Result
Wolves	Desot (L)	Tom Isted	Field of the Dead	The Gulley +	8th
Wolves	Lymel	Clemmie Bailey	Thrall Threads	Stepping Stones	10th
Wolves	Tibor	Rob Whitmore	Temple Spirit Run **		16th
Wolves	Nebra	Sanchia Erboks	Thrall Threads **		15th

Tigers	Warrior Name	Real Name	Elimination 1	Elimination 2	Result
Tigers	Marca (L)	Carys Thomas	Thrall Threads	Chamber of the Three-Headed Serpent +	3rd
Tigers	Sohar	Charlotte Moss-McCrory	Chamber of the Three-Headed Serpent +		2nd
Tigers	Jenro	Joseph Turner	Waters of Time *		14th
Tigers	Hadav	Diveakksh Schae	Pillars of Courage	Chariots	11th

*Not enough jewels to be brought back.

**Team elected not to bring the warrior back.

***Stripped of leadership after being brought back.

+Elimination on final challenges with no option to bring back

== Challenges ==
Seven virtues must be completed before the warriors may enter the Secret Temple. Each has two trials for the warriors to complete, making fourteen challenges in all. In each challenge, four jewels are available to be won.

Speed

- Temple Spirit Run: Bags containing either sand or jewels are suspended from the ceiling, and are raised and lowered repeatedly. The warriors must run and jump to grab the bags and find one of four that contains a jewel and present it to the sole spirit guard keeping watch before the time runs out, lest he eliminate them from their quest.

Eliminations: Tibor of the Wolves and Yonra of the Panthers, only Yonra was brought back.

- Waters of Time: Speed is of the essence in this challenge, where the warriors must run carrying water from one side, to the long containers at the other. Filling the containers raises the precious jewel so that the warrior may reach in and receive their reward. If the jewel is not held when the second drum beats, the warrior will be eliminated.

Eliminations: Jenro of the Tigers, who was not brought back as the team didn't have enough jewels to do so, also, Jenro had injured his hip during the challenge. Jenro was about to get his jewel but the drum sounded and the serpent took him as he was tipping the water in.

Strength

- Obelisks of the Sun: The warriors must reconstruct a shattered statue by carrying the pieces to the top of the hill and assembling them within the time limit. Doing so will focus the sunlight to produce a jewel; failure to do so will result in the warrior's elimination.

Eliminations: Arton of the Panthers, who was brought back. He was about to put his final piece on when the drum sounded.

- Chariots: Each warrior sits in a chariot that they must move forward by pulling on a guide rope, and tug themselves over the bumps that block an otherwise speedy path. They must collect the pieces of tube along the way that, when constructed, allows them to unhook a jewel bag strung high overhead. Failure to retrieve a jewel and make it back to the start within the time limit will end the warrior's quest.

Eliminations: Arton of the Panthers and Hadav of the tigers, who could not be brought back because both of them had been eliminated before. Lymel suffered heatstroke and was unable to do the chariot challenge, so Desot got her gem for her.

Agility

- Bridge/Stepping Stones: The team of warriors must traverse a set of rocks without touching the ground, collecting jewel bags along the way, that may contain either pebbles or jewels. Should they touch the ground, they will be eliminated. Bridge provides the warriors with planks of wood they may use to cross from stone to stone. Stepping Stones provides no such support, and warriors must jump to find their way to the exit.

Eliminations: Yeada and Samra of the Eagles and Lymel of the Wolves. Lymel could not be brought back because she had already been eliminated once, Desot told her not to go for any jewels but she did. In the Eagles, only Yeada was brought back.

- Thrall Threads: A tangled web awaits the team of warriors, who must traverse through the threads without knocking any of them, as this will cause bells attached to the strings to ring, alerting the spirit guards to their presence and punishing them for their carelessness via elimination. Several jewel bags are attached in hard-to-reach positions, delicately connected to the threads themselves.

Eliminations: Lymel and Nebra of the Wolves, Marca of the Tigers and Taylan of the Eagles. Nebra was not brought back but the others were.

Courage

- Pillars of Courage: Courage is tested, as each warrior must traverse the gaps between a set of sturdy pillars, from one side of a building to the other. Failure to find this courage, or loose footing resulting in the warrior falling, will see that warrior's quest come to an abrupt end. Jewel bags are suspended above each pillar for those warriors brave enough to reach high above them.

Eliminations: Hadav of the Tigers was brought back.

- The Ledge: Courage is once again tested at great heights, each warrior tasked with making their way from one side of a building to the other, with a thin ledge as their only path. Any warrior who lacks the courage, or should fall, will no longer be a part of the quest. Jewel bags may be reached above a warrior's head.

Leadership

- Enchanted Demons: The warriors must each pick up a rope, connected to the centre of a circle guarded by spirit guards and use the hook in the centre to pick up a casket containing the jewels. The guards, normally kept in slumber owing to an enchantment read by an old man nearby, will wake when the ropes are taken up and the man becomes silent, and begin to pace round the circle, becoming ever faster. Should the guards touch either the warrior or the ropes, that warrior will be eliminated.
- Field of the Dead: One warrior is elected to be blindfolded, and be guided by another warrior through a time-worn field that was once host to a great battle. Jewel bags are suspended in strategic locations; the blindfolded warrior must be careful not to touch the many strewn swords, weaponry, skulls and fallen men, or they too will find their end on this field.

Eliminations: Desot of the Wolves and Sonro of the Panthers were both brought back. The remaining Panthers, Aksu and Yonra, decided to have Aksu to take Sonro's place as leader.

Wisdom

- Rangoli Ring: A set of symbols are placed around a large circle, with the jewels placed on a pillar in the centre. However, the circle will erupt into flame if approached, unless the warriors are able to draw the correct symbols missing from three of the surrounding circles. The warriors must identify the correct completed drawing from the five presented to them, and transcribe the three missing symbols accurately into the empty circles using the colour powders provided, and within the time limit, or the jewels will be lost. On completing the symbols, any mistakes made will cause the fire to erupt when a stone is tossed into the centre, whilst a correct set of symbols will allow them to pass freely and collect the jewels as their reward.

Failures: The Wolves

- Riddle Trap: A riddle is read to the warriors by Satyarani, who must complete the Sum and identify the corresponding symbol from the result in their book. On finding the correct symbol, a warrior must traverse the walkway ahead of them, using only that symbol and retrieve the four jewels that lie at the far side of the path. On doing so, two spiked walls will begin to close in, and the warrior must make it back to the starting point before the walls close in on them. Stepping on the wrong symbol in haste will cause jewels to be lost.

Accuracy

- Giant Catapult: Aiming skills are tested, as the warriors must fire rocks from a giant catapult to knock down as many of the four jars containing jewels as they can.
- Archery: The warriors must fire twelve arrows at targets that open and close repeatedly, in order that the jewel bags drop from the targets above. They must also be mindful of the spirit guards that approach from behind, advancing ever closer as time wears on.

The 14 Tasks	Day	Panthers	Jewels	Eagles	Jewels	Wolves	Jewels	Tigers	Jewels
The 14 Tasks	**2**	Waters of Time	10	Riddle Trap	9	Chariots	10	The Ledge	10
The 14 Tasks	**3**	Bridge	13	Enchanted Demons	13	Temple Spirit Run	13	Pillars of Courage	5
The 14 Tasks	**4**	Rangoli Ring	17	Obelisks of the Sun	17	Waters of Time	17	Field of the Dead	6
The 14 Tasks	**5**	The Ledge	21	Temple Spirit Run	21	Thrall Threads	10	Giant Catapult	7
The 14 Tasks	**6**	Obelisks of the Sun	16	Giant Catapult	22	Field of the Dead	2	Riddle Trap	9
The 14 Tasks	**7**	Enchanted Demons	20	Archery	23	Obelisks of the Sun	6	Thrall Threads	1
The 14 Tasks	**8**	Chariots	23	Field of the Dead	27	Rangoli Ring	6	Waters of Time	4
The 14 Tasks	**9**	Riddle Trap	26	Stepping Stones	21	Giant Catapult	9	Temple Spirit Run	7
The 14 Tasks	**10**	Thrall Threads	30	Chariots	24	Pillars of Courage	10	Enchanted Demons	11
The 14 Tasks	**11**	Field of the Dead	22	Rangoli Ring	28	The Ledge	14	Bridge	15
The 14 Tasks	**12**	Temple Spirit Run	16	Pillars of Courage	32	Enchanted Demons	18	Archery	18
The 14 Tasks	**13**	Archery	18	Waters of Time	35	Riddle Trap	22	Chariots	20
The 14 Tasks	**14**	Giant Catapult	22	Thrall Threads	30	Stepping Stones	22	Obelisks of the Sun	24
The 14 Tasks	**15**	Pillars of Courage	26	The Ledge	34	Archery	26	Rangoli Ring	28

=== The Gulley ===
At the conclusion of the fourteen tasks, Satyarani allowed a passage to the finals for the team with the most jewels gained from the tasks. Of the remaining three teams, only those that were able to complete The Gulley were allowed through. This challenge consisted of a crawl underneath a rope section where Aksu was about to get up but was eliminated, followed by shields on ropes where Desot had trouble which the warriors had to pull, and finally a climb over a wall of boulders and Yonra was about to get up when she was blasted by Nevar. Three warriors fell in the Gulley and hence did not go forward to the final: Aksu and Yonra of the Panthers, and Desot of the Wolves.

=== Temple Challenges ===
An additional set of challenges were then posed for the remaining warriors, who grouped together as one team initially under the leadership of Yeada. Elimination in any of these challenges ended the warrior's quest and eliminated warriors are marked in bold in the challenges listed, which are also listed in the order they were played. Yeada, the leader, was the first to be eliminated; Taylan was then elected leader. On Taylan's elimination, the warriors rolled their dice to decide the leader, and Sohar rolled the highest number, becoming the next leader.

Meanwhile, as the action moves from outside to the Citadel, Raven has doubts as to whether Satyarani is correct about the demons' supposed inability to cross the Citadel walls when he believes that he sees demons seemingly walking through them, and grows increasingly frustrated with the further tests and his inability to guard his warriors, at Satyarani's insistence. Although Raven finds the tests unusual and seemingly without aim, she explains that the tests are showing her who are the strongest warriors: Vajra Scales demonstrates who was thinking clearly and who was not; Snakes and Ladders shows who had the instinct to survive; and Catapult Drop showed who remained calm in the face of adversity. Whilst Raven initially expresses disbelief that a warrior may be eliminated due to chance in Snake Charmer, Satyarani explains that it is a test of nerve and bravery, as each warrior must volunteer to take their turn.

==== First Day ====
- Citadel Gates: A riddle must be solved so that the letters corresponding to the answer can be matched against symbols that will, in turn, open the gates to the Citadel. The warriors use the letters to slide a set of symbols into the correct place so that the word reads vertically.
- Alchemist's Potion: The warriors buy the correct ingredients from the marketplace using a riddle posed to them by Satyarani, and mix them pouring the results into six bottles, one for each warrior.
- Golden Stone: Symbols are briefly displayed to the warrior in a fire on a stone by pouring their potions into a bowl one at a time. The warriors must commit these symbols to memory and write them down in a book.

==== Second Day ====
- Statues: Three statues are present, each clutching a scroll in their hand. The warriors must identify the correct statue using the symbols they wrote down, make the correct offering and obtain the scroll.
- Vajra Scales: The warriors must balance the scales correctly by emptying bags of sand into the trays in correct amounts. The mirrors in a second set of scales turn black over time and the warriors must retrieve at least one by ensuring their scales are balanced; retrieving a mirror when the scales are unbalanced will cause elimination.
- Snakes and Ladders: This challenge is played much like the traditional game, with a Snake Demon at the end of the board. The warriors take it in turn to roll the dice and move around the board, in a bid to reach the end; the demon also moves first on each warrior's turn and moves in the opposite direction. Should it land next to a warrior, that warrior is transported back to the beginning. In addition, each player has one chance to nominate another player to take their move.

Yeada nominated Marca to take her move, who went on to escape, whilst Yeada herself was soon sent back to the beginning. As the last warrior on the board, she was eliminated by the demon.

- Catapult Drop: The warriors must hit a target on the wall, releasing a rope which the warriors must then use to abseil down the side of a building collecting parchments with symbols on them. At the end of this challenge, the rope disappeared and the warriors were seemingly stuck between the walls of the building.

==== Third Day ====
- No Way Out: After becoming trapped, the warriors decide to put their parchment pieces together, which produces a new riddle for them to examine. Symbols also appear on the wall and the warriors must find and touch the pairs of symbols that appear on the combined parchment. As they must touch all pairs of symbols simultaneously, this involved some warriors using their feet to reach some symbols. When the symbols are touched, a gap appears in the wall and the warriors must assemble two columns using the broken pieces found in the previous room. When this is assembled, a portal appears to bring them back to the Citadel.
- Sign in the Sand: Back in the marketplace, Satyarani shows the warriors a snake-like symbol which they must search for. The marketplace holds many symbols, many on signs scattered around the area. But the warriors soon realise that the symbol is in fact found on a man's forehead and upon paying him, find that he plays them a tune which they must memorise.
- Snake Charmer: The warriors must listen to three snake charmers, picking the one that plays the tune that matches the one that the man with the headscarf played to them previously. On picking the correct charmer, they must individually select one of five baskets surrounding that snake charmer with each warrior volunteering to take their turn; whilst four baskets are empty and will transport that warrior to the Temple when they climb inside, one basket contains a snake, and for the warrior choosing that basket, their quest is over.

Taylan, who chose to go second after Marca, picked the second basket from the right, which contained the snake, and was eliminated from the quest. This challenge was based on luck.

Note: There was only 1 snake.

==== Fourth Day ====
- Chamber of the Red Demons: Four amulets hidden in the walls must be found and demons in the chamber must be kept docile by reflecting a beam of light into their eyes using the mirrors gained previously in Vajra Scales.
- The Door to the Underworld: To gain access to the inner sanctum, the warriors must solve a riddle to align the three wheels barring the door.

At this point, Raven decides to join the warriors to the end of the quest. Satyarani agrees, but warns him that he must not enter the final chamber otherwise the walls will collapse, for only mortals may enter the chamber. He waits patiently outside the chamber.

- Cave of Fear: Each warrior must enter the cave in turn to find a key. The four keys are to be found in a hole of cockroaches, a pot filled with snakes, a second bowl of slime, and finally in the skeletal hand of a demon, which is pulled off when the key is taken.

While this is going on, Satyarani begins to summon Nevar.

- The Way of the Dead: The warriors must each follow a path from one end of the cave to another over planks that are positioned over stepping stones; when a warrior reaches the end, their path disappears.

Karja went second and was eliminated when she ran across one of her boards which caused it to snap, halfway through the challenge.

=== Final Challenge ===
- Chamber of the Three-Headed Serpent: A riddle shows the path the warriors must take. They must step across a pathway using the correct symbols that spell out serpent, picking up a ring along the way. The ring is placed on the end of a long serpent, which the warriors must then stand and balance on and walk across to the end, avoiding the swinging maces along the way.

Sohar and Marca both fell from the snake, and were eliminated. The remaining warrior, Sonro, then climbed a rope to obtain a vessel.

- Well of the Three-Headed Serpent: Having gained the vessel, Sonro must fill it with the elixir that will free Raven's homeland from Nevar's grip. The bowl containing the elixir is surrounded by snakes. Sonro must then retrace his steps, over the snake path and the symbols to the beginning of the Chamber.

When told about the loss of two of the three warriors by Satyarani, who watches through a viewing portal, Raven is determined to protect the sole survivor. Satyarani informs Raven that he may look into the chamber, but that placing a foot in the chamber will bring it down around him.

However, in Escape from the Underworld, Nevar appears and is close to eliminating Sonro with his Staff of Power. When Raven intervenes, a battle ensues allowing Sonro to escape with Satyarani's assistance.

- Time of Reckoning: Sonro must decipher one final riddle. Should he enter the three-digit number correctly on the spindle in front of him, the correct portal of the two in the wall will open, and he will escape; an incorrect number will open the other portal, which will lead to his doom.

With Sonro entering the correct number and escaping, Raven and Nevar fight. Raven manages to temporarily overpower Nevar and offers him a chance for redemption by stepping into the temple and healing himself with the elixir. Nevar then tries to attack Raven again and wrest his staff from him. The attack forces Raven into the temple, causing its collapse. Satyarani congratulates Sonro outside the temple, but informs him of the loss of Raven. However, all is not as it seems, for Raven joins the successful warrior and Satyarani outside, having transformed into his bird form and escaped, flying faster than a man can flee.

Sonro gains a Golden Staff for being the victorious warrior, and is to be known as "Sonro, Guardian of the Golden Staff, Hero of the Eastern Land, Conqueror of the Secret Temple". Raven takes the elixir, and with it, he will be able to restore his homeland. Satyarani returns to her land, and Sonro and Raven begin their journey home.

Nevar has seemingly perished in the ruins of the temple; however, at the end of the final credits, his eye is seen to open beneath his mask — clearly, he has not been vanquished as Raven and Satyarani had thought.

== See also ==
- Raven (2002 TV series)
- Raven: The Island
- Raven: The Dragon's Eye
