= Raven: The Island =

British children's game show

- Genre: Children's; Game Show
- Starring: James Mackenzie; Lindsay McKenzie; Michael MacKenzie
- Voices of: Jo James
- Theme music composer: David Brockett
- Country of origin: United Kingdom
- Original language: English
- No. of seasons: 1
- No. of episodes: 20

Production
- Production location: Scotland

Original release
- Network: CBBC
- Release: 2006 – 2006

Raven: The Island is a BBC Scotland children's adventure game show, and the first spin‑off to the main series, Raven. It comprises one series, initially airing in 2006 on the CBBC Channel, and then during CBBC on BBC One. In this series, warriors compete as teams and attempt to complete the many challenges on the island of Alaunus, retrieving timepieces in the hope of defeating the evil Nevar.

== Plot ==
Raven: The Island sees the island of Alaunus, Raven's homeland as a child, come under control by the evil force of Nevar and his demons. Raven has been exiled from the island, and so his close and trusted friend, Princess Erina, assists Raven's young warriors in their quest, with the help of her sprite companion, Haryad. Their only hope of restoring the Island lies with the three teams of four warriors, who must travel to the island and towards the ruined fortress that once belonged to Erina's father, collecting timepieces along the way that Nevar, unable to destroy them, has attempted to hide in perilous traps and challenges. Using the timepieces, together with an upcoming solar eclipse, they must then enter the fortress and take an acorn from the Great Oak, stolen and locked away by Nevar to cut new Staffs of Power for his elite demons, so that a new tree may be planted away from the island, far from Nevar's dark domain.

== Format ==
Raven: The Island features a set of different challenges for the warriors, but differs in that the warriors are split into teams; in Raven: The Island, this consists of three groups of four. These teams have different animal associations and colour clothing; the Lions wear green clothing, the Wolves wear blue clothing, and the Eagles wear maroon. Each team also has a team leader, and follow separate paths to the fortress, undertaking different challenges along the way.

This series does not provide the concept of lives or rings: should a warrior fail a task by being caught by a demon, or fail to navigate an obstacle in a challenge, that warrior is instantly eliminated and plays no further part in the quest, and cannot be returned or brought back (in contrast to collecting rings in Raven, or exchanging jewels in the second spin‑off, The Secret Temple).

== Characters ==
=== Raven ===
(James Mackenzie): Raven makes appearances in this series, but does not guide the warriors as frequently as in Raven, or The Secret Temple. He converses with Princess Erina on the warriors' progress, and talks to Cyrus to gain information about matters such as the upcoming eclipse, and the timepieces.

=== Princess Erina ===
(Lindsay McKenzie): Raven's close and trusted friend. She carries a Staff of Power with her (topped with a crown carving) and is helped by a tree sprite named Haryad. Erina lives on the Island of Alaunus, which used to belong to her father before Nevar took it over with his dark magic, and is the one who leaves signs and clues to guide the warriors to Nevar's fortress. She cannot meet the warriors herself until the quest is over, for her life force, and that of her Staff of Power made from the ancient Oak, would guide demons straight to them.

=== Haryad ===
(played by Jack Gilliland; voiced by Jo James): Erina's companion is a tree sprite – the spirit of the Great Oak that Nevar has stolen – who appears as a blue ball of light, and reports the warriors' progress back to her.

=== Cyrus the Astronomer ===
(Michael MacKenzie): An old and wise astronomer who works out when the eclipse is due; he also discovered the many magical properties on Alaunus, such as the Time Wells and the Pearls of Wisdom, when sorcery returned to the island. His great knowledge has been passed on to Erina, and he is seen explaining such matters as the eclipse, and the nature and location of the timepieces, to Raven.

=== Nevar ===
The main antagonist of all the Raven stories, Nevar has seized control of Alaunus by capturing the Enchanted Oak, from which the Staffs of Power for Raven, Erina and his own were cut. He has locked it within the Ruins of the Castle of Alaunus, which he now controls, and has begun to cut Staffs of Power for his black‑robed Elite Demons, slowly causing the death of the Oak.

== Warriors ==
12 warriors started the quest, divided into three teams of four. Each warrior is given a warrior name, formed from their real name, and wears their team's colour: green for the Lions, blue for the Wolves, and maroon for the Eagles. The tables below summarise their outcomes.

=== Lions ===
Lions
Warrior	Exit point	Reason
Delra (Leader)	Fortress: Enchanted Oak	Escaped safely
Goram	Fortress (Inner Chamber)	Knocked from obstacle course
Kaysa	Fortress surroundings	Caught by Thrall demons
Norso	River of the Rising Moon	Fell from stepping stone

=== Wolves ===
Wolves
Warrior	Exit point	Reason
Corso (Leader)	Fortress: Enchanted Oak	Escaped safely
Tanla (Leader #1)	Mount Zoat	Did not attempt second half of abseil
Bayle	Fortress surroundings	Caught by Thrall demons
Jenso	River of the Rising Moon	Caught by Thrall demons

=== Eagles ===
Eagles
Warrior	Exit point	Reason
Tanel (Leader)	Fortress: Enchanted Oak	Escaped safely
Simlo	Fortress Causeway	Failed spell; caught by demon
Cared	Bog o’ Balor	Slipped on a toadstool
Masam	Bog o’ Balor	Missed footing on toadstool

== Episode progress ==
This chart tracks each warrior’s status and time‑pieces for all 20 episodes.

Warrior	Team	Island Path (Ep 1–15)															Fortress Approach (Ep 16–18)			Fortress (Ep 19–20)	
Warrior	Team	1	2	3	4	5	6	7	8	9	10	11	12	13	14	15	16	17	18	19	20
Pieces in play (end of ep)		0	0	0	0	7	14	16	24	29	34	36	34	39	42	45	28	28	26	14	12
Delra	Lions	●	●	●	●	●	●	+1	●	●	+1	●	●	+1	●	●	●	●	●	●	★
Goram	Lions	●	●	●	●	+2	●	●	+1	+1	●	●	●	●	+1	+2	●	●	●	✖	—
Kaysa	Lions	●	●	●	●	●	+3	●	+1	●	●	●	+1	●	●	●	✖	—	—	—	—
Norso	Lions	●	+1	✖	—	—	—	—	—	—	—	—	—	—	—	—	—	—	—	—	—
Corso	Wolves	●	●	●	●	+3	●	●	+1	+1	+1	●	+1	●	●	+1	●	●	●	●	★
Tanla	Wolves	●	●	●	●	✖	—	—	—	—	—	—	—	—	—	—	—	—	—	—	—
Bayle	Wolves	●	●	●	●	●	+2	●	+3	+1	+1	●	+2	+1	●	+1	✖	—	—	—	—
Jenso	Wolves	●	✖	—	—	—	—	—	—	—	—	—	—	—	—	—	—	—	—	—	—
Tanel	Eagles	●	●	●	●	●	●	●	+1	●	+2	+1	●	●	●	+1	●	●	●	●	★
Simlo	Eagles	●	●	●	●	●	●	+1	●	●	+1	●	●	●	●	●	●	●	✖	—	—
Masam	Eagles	●	●	●	●	●	+2	●	●	●	+1	✖(−3)	—	—	—	—	—	—	—	—	—
Cared	Eagles	●	●	●	●	+2	●	●	+1	●	●	✖(−2)	—	—	—	—	—	—	—	—	—
Key – ● Active (no pieces) • +n Active & gained *n* pieces • ✖ Eliminated • — Not in play • ★ Escaped / series winner

== Time‑piece totals by episode ==
The cumulative number of timepieces in play at the end of each episode:

Episode	Cumulative time‑pieces
1	0
2	0
3	0
4	0
5	7
6	14
7	16
8	24
9	29
10	34
11	36
12	34
13	39
14	42
15	45
16	28
17	28
18	26
19	14
20	14

== Challenges ==
Ep.	#	Challenge (Area)	Detailed Description	Team	Result	Eliminations	Time Pieces		
Ep.	#	Challenge (Area)	Detailed Description	Team	Result	Eliminations	Δ	Cum.	
1	1	Directory (Near Drune Hill)	Navigate using a map and a riddle from the Rune Book to identify specific stones.	Lions	Pass	—	0	0	
1	2	Cairn Milestone (Forest Edge)	Rebuild a shattered statue whose pictograms, once assembled, reveal an arrow pointing the way forward.	Wolves	Pass	—	0	0	
1	3	Plank Bridge (Leaping Salmon)	Reconstruct a bridge by placing wooden planks across stepping stones in the river to cross.	Eagles	Pass	—	0	0	
1	Σ	Episode 1 Total					0	0	0
2	1	Symbol Path (Forest of Dawn Time)	Hang scattered rune boards on trees and use a riddle to find the two runes marking the correct path.	Lions	Pass	—	0	0	
2	2	Compass Stone	Use a riddle and a compass to correctly orient a large compass stone, revealing the path.	Wolves	Pass	—	0	0	
2	3	Grey Sky Mountain	Climb a perilous cliff face to continue the journey.	Eagles	Pass	—	0	0	
2	Σ	Episode 2 Total					0	0	0
3	1	Stone Circle	Rebuild a stone circle and use the Rune Book to decode a word that turns the circle to point the way.	Lions	Pass	—	0	0	
3	2	Thrall River	Traverse upstream while avoiding bell-adorned thrall threads strung across the river.	Wolves	Fail	Jenso (rang a bell)	0	0	
3	3	Frozen Warrior	Translate symbols on the shield of a frozen warrior, who then comes alive to point the correct path.	Eagles	Pass	—	0	0	
3	Σ	Episode 3 Total					0	0	0
4	1	Speed Run	Jump to grab bags moving overhead to find timepieces, while avoiding approaching wood demons.	Lions	Partial	—	+1	5	
4	2	Archery (Green Lady)	Hit opening and closing targets to secure four timepieces while wary of demons alerted by the first shot.	Wolves	Partial	—	+2	5	
4	3	Netting (Diving Bird)	Use a net to catch timepieces floating down the river while balanced on stepping stones.	Eagles	Partial	—	+2	5	
4	Σ	Episode 4 Total					+5	5	5
5	1	Stone Trolls	Climb Drune Hill to collect three timepieces hanging from stone trolls on the cliff face.	Lions	Success	—	+3	12	
5	2	Giant Lilies (Loarn)	Swim to retrieve timepieces from giant lily pads while avoiding enchanted, eliminating seed-pods.	Wolves	Success	—	+3	12	
5	3	Bones of Bryn Brahan	Guide a blindfolded teammate through a battlefield littered with debris to collect two timepieces.	Eagles	Partial	—	+1	12	
5	Σ	Episode 5 Total					+7	12	12
6	1	Time Well (Melwa)	Reassemble five stones according to a riddle in the Rune Book to generate a timepiece from a Time Well.	Lions	Success	—	+1	19	
6	2	Abseil Mount Zoat	Each warrior must abseil down a cliff face to continue.	Wolves	Pass	Tanla (withdrew)	0	19	
6	3	Watch Tower (Whispering)	Climb a tower and cross a rope bridge to retrieve a timepiece from a platform.	Eagles	Success	—	+6	19	
6	Σ	Episode 6 Total					+7	19	19
7	1	Archery (Og Wood)	Shoot opening and closing targets to secure timepieces, wary of demons alerted by the first arrow.	Lions	Success	—	+2	23	
7	2	Silent Collection	Silently retrieve timepieces attached to bells, as any sound will alert demon sentinels.	Wolves	Partial	—	+2	23	
7	3	Stone Trolls (Cannoch)	Two warriors must climb the Crag to collect one timepiece each hanging from the cliff face.	Eagles	Success	—	0	23	
7	Σ	Episode 7 Total					+4	23	23
8	1	Raft Build (Devlin)	Reconstruct a demon-damaged boat to retrieve a single timepiece from a small island.	Lions	Success	—	+8	39	
8	2	Bog Cross (Megrin)	Cross a deadly mire by stepping on toadstools, collecting hanging timepieces along the way.	Wolves	Success	—	+2	39	
8	3	Giant Lilies (Corra)	Swim to retrieve timepieces from giant lily pads while avoiding enchanted, eliminating seed-pods.	Eagles	Success	—	+6	39	
8	Σ	Episode 8 Total					+16	39	39
9	1	Watch Tower (Shadow)	Climb a tower and cross a narrow plank to an adjacent tower to retrieve a timepiece from a gargoyle.	Lions	Success	—	+5	49	
9	2	River Side Plinths	Retrieve two timepieces located on the sides of a stepping stone path across a river.	Wolves	Success	—	+2	49	
9	3	Archery (Fergus Holt)	Shoot opening and closing targets to secure timepieces, wary of demons alerted by the first arrow.	Eagles	Success	—	+3	49	
9	Σ	Episode 9 Total					+10	49	49
10	1	Abseil Flint Drop	Each warrior must abseil down a cliff face to continue the journey.	Lions	Pass	—	0	54	
10	2	Raft Build (Dana)	Reconstruct a demon-damaged boat to retrieve a single timepiece from a small island.	Wolves	Success	—	+5	54	
10	3	Time Well (Rowan)	Reassemble five stones according to a riddle in the Rune Book to generate a timepiece from a Time Well.	Eagles	Success	—	0	54	
10	Σ	Episode 10 Total					+5	54	54
11	1	Giant Lilies (Ula)	Swim to retrieve timepieces from giant lily pads while avoiding enchanted, eliminating seed-pods.	Lions	Success	—	+2	58	
11	2	Stone Trolls (Sun Spear)	Climb Sun Spear Hill to collect two timepieces hanging from stone gargoyles on the cliff face.	Wolves	Success	—	+2	58	
11	3	Speed Run (Triple Thorn)	Jump to grab bags moving overhead to find timepieces, while avoiding approaching wood demons.	Eagles	Partial	—	0	58	
11	Σ	Episode 11 Total					+4	58	58
12	1	River Cross (Rising Moon)	Retrieve timepieces from threads above a stepping stone path across a river.	Lions	Fail	Norso (fell in river)	−2	56	
12	2	Time Well (Crane)	Reassemble five stones according to a riddle in the Rune Book to generate a timepiece from a Time Well.	Wolves	Success	—	0	56	
12	3	Bog Cross (Balor)	Cross a deadly bog via toadstools, collecting timepieces along the path.	Eagles	Fail	Masam, Cared (fell in bog)	0	56	
12	Σ	Episode 12 Total					−2	56	56
13	1	Bog Cross (Stoorworm)	Cross a marsh on toadstools, collecting timepieces from poles at the sides of the path.	Lions	Success	—	+5	66	
13	2	Bones of Tallow Vale	Guide a blindfolded teammate through a debris-filled battlefield to collect two timepieces.	Wolves	Success	—	+5	66	
13	3	Raft Build (Lochan Caer)	Reconstruct a demon-damaged boat to retrieve a single timepiece from a small island.	Eagles	Success	—	0	66	
13	Σ	Episode 13 Total					+10	66	66
14	1	Bones of Glen Morrigan	Guide a blindfolded teammate through a debris-filled battlefield to collect two timepieces.	Lions	Success	—	+3	69	
14	2	Hawk Wood Watch Tower	Climb a tower and cross a tightrope to an adjacent platform to retrieve a timepiece.	Wolves	Success	—	0	69	
14	3	Abseil Mount Gruagach	Each warrior must abseil down a cliff face to continue.	Eagles	Pass	—	0	69	
14	Σ	Episode 14 Total					+3	69	69
15	1	Path Completion Bonus	Each of the nine surviving warriors receives one timepiece from the sprite Erina.	All	Awarded	—	+9	78	
16	1	Thrall Thread Forest	Navigate a forest with 112 bell-threads. The 17 timepieces carried by the team are confiscated by demons.	All	Fail	Bayle, Kaysa (hit threads)	−17	61	
16	2	Frozen Timepiece	Use three brass telescopes to focus sunlight, melting a block of ice to reveal an opal timepiece disc.	All	Success	—	0	61	
17	1	Nevar's Eye	Use a catapult to launch 15 kg stones to smash a crystal, disabling Nevar's surveillance.	All	Success	—	0	61	
17	2	Magic Stone & Sky Rune	After using a torch to burn moss from a stone to reveal a magic verse, the warriors successfully use a fake sky-rune from the sprite Erina to deceive Nevar.	All	Success	—	0	61	
18	1	Potion Brewing	Gather ingredients (midnight dew, wraith root) and boil for four minutes to create a purple vanquishing potion.	All	Success	—	0	61	
18	2	Demon Vanquish	A misread incantation leads to a demon seizing a warrior; a second demon is neutralized with the potion.	All	Partial	Simlo (seized by demon)	−2	59	
19	1	Totality Clock	Insert timepieces into a clock to buy time, turning a cam wheel to release sand from vials (1 min per disc).	All	Success	—	−12	47	
19	2	Catapult Breach	Collapse a wall with a catapult and retrieve a brass key while under a barrage of arrows.	All	Success	—	0	47	
19	3	Mirror Demons	Use a mirror shield to reflect the petrifying gaze of demons while navigating a zig-zag walkway.	All	Success	—	0	47	
19	4	Inner-Chamber Beam	Cross an 18-meter beam while avoiding swinging pendulums.	All	Fail	Goram (struck by pendulum)	0	47	
20	1	Rotating Door Locks	Align four rings on a complex lock to open a large oak door.	All	Success	—	0	47	
20	2	The Great Oak Acorn	Choose the correct one of three acorn types from a dying magical oak; the right one glows, others petrify.	All	Success	—	0	47	
20	3	Escape Portal	With the fortress collapsing as the eclipse ends, the final three warriors escape through a portal.	All	Escaped	—	0	47	

== Production ==
The initial sequences, before the warriors arrive on the Island of Alaunus, were shot at Loch Lomond in Scotland. Most of the subsequent challenges were then filmed at Auchengillan International Outdoor Centre.

The series was directed by Maria Stewart, who also directed the second spin‑off, The Secret Temple. It was produced by Paul Hineman, director of the third and fourth series of the main Raven series.

== See also ==
- Raven (2002 TV series)
- Raven: The Secret Temple
- Raven: The Dragon's Eye
