= Aisha Toussaint =

Seychellois-Scottish actress

- Born: 5 August 1995 (age 30); Seychelles
- Education: St Peter the Apostle High School
- Occupations: Actress and presenter
- Years active: 2015–present

Aisha Toussaint (born 5 August 1995) is a Seychellois-Scottish actress and presenter. From 2017 to 2018, she portrayed the role of Jules Belmont in River City and in 2017, she began presenting the CBBC series Raven.

== Early life ==
Toussaint was born on 5 August 1995 in the Seychelles and is the middle child of five, having four brothers. She moved to Scotland when she was six, and attended St Peter the Apostle High School. Her mother was a dialysis nurse.

== Career ==
From 2017 to 2018, she portrayed the role of Jules Belmont in the BBC Scotland soap opera River City, a job she landed while still studying for her Bachelor of Arts in Acting from the New College Lanarkshire, though prior to this she had played a "Spy in Training" in M.I. High in 2012 and "Poppy's Friend" in Pramface in 2014. Episodes featuring Belmont began airing on 28 June 2016.

On 27 June 2017, it was announced that Toussaint would be a presenter of Raven. Toussaint replaced then-fellow River City cast member James Mackenzie. In September 2019, she appeared in an episode of the BBC soap opera Doctors as Polly Spooner.

== Personal life ==
Toussaint lives in Glasgow, and has been described as a "young Bankie" by Clydebank Live.
