= Raven: The Dragon's Eye =

British children's game show

- Genre: Children's; Game Show
- Starring: James Mackenzie; Daniel Jackson
- Theme music composer: David Brockett
- Country of origin: United Kingdom
- Original language: English
- No. of seasons: 1
- No. of episodes: 20

Production
- Production location: Scotland

Original release
- Network: BBC
- Release: 2 March – 27 March 2009

Raven: The Dragon's Eye is a BBC Scotland children's adventure game show, and the third spin-off to the main series, Raven. It comprises one series, which aired first on the CBBC Channel in 2009. In a similar manner to the previous spin-off, Raven: The Secret Temple, warriors compete as teams and attempt to collect objects (stones, in this series) by completing tasks.

Unlike previous Raven series, the opening titles always include a safety message from Raven: "Our Raven Warriors are always supervised and have their safety checked by experts. Please do not copy the challenges yourself."

== Plot ==
Returning from the successful Secret Temple quest and able to unfreeze his homeland, Raven discovers that his arch-enemy Nevar plans to locate the Dragon's Eye, a mystical stone that affords the bearer great power. Determined to stop Nevar from obtaining the Eye, Raven embarks on a quest to destroy it with 16 of his warriors, who group into teams of four. As Nevar approaches, a new character emerges from the forest — Ervan, former ally of Nevar's under his command — who appears to offer help; Raven must decide whether he is friend or foe.

== Characters ==
Raven (James Mackenzie): Raven returns to stop Nevar from seizing the Dragon's Eye. Though he is unwilling to reject his assistance outright, Raven grows steadily more suspicious of Ervan as the quest comes to an end.

Nevar: Once again, Raven's nemesis takes up the role as the main antagonist of the series. This mysterious creature, clad in black hooded robes and his contorted face hidden behind an iron mask, Nevar hunts for the Dragon's Eye, with which he plans to take over Raven's kingdom. Still with hordes of demons at his command, he proves a difficult obstacle for Raven's warriors to overcome. He has been the re-occurring villain for three series now, Raven: The Island, Raven: The Secret Temple and now Raven: The Dragon's Eye, as well as being the antagonist for the original Raven series. At the end of the final episode, he was seemingly destroyed along with Ervan and the eye itself, but Nevar is seen on the top of the Castle of Shadows and looks on, hinting to more future quests.

Ervan (Daniel Jackson): A former soldier under Nevar's command, offering help to Raven and his warriors, and providing Raven with a set of stones that will allow the warriors to be brought back.

== Challenges ==
=== Leadership Trials ===
Wolves: Pennant Run, Spear Strike

Bears: Barrel Roll, Shot Hurl

Otters: Ring Line, Symbol Square

Eagles: Shield Race, Shape Build

=== Spirit Trials ===
Archer's Aim: Warriors aim at the targets using a bow and arrow — one stone falls for each hit.

Cursed Earth: Warriors use blocks to step over the Cursed Earth trying not to touch the floor and collecting stones as they go. If they touch the floor or run out of time they are eliminated. (Eliminations: Miran, Larim and Nardel of the Bears — all three surviving members of the team were eliminated after mistakenly placing one of their blocks out of bounds. Hareb and Arros of the Wolves — only Hareb was brought back.)

Catapult Drop: Warriors use a catapult to knock cages containing stones off giant posts. It is untimed but they have limited amo.

Letter Path: One warrior crosses the Letter Path — questions are posed for each step they stand on and the answer begins with that letter. For each incorrect answer a stone is lost.

Long Board: Warriors paddle their way on a longboard to collect stones out on the loch. If they fail to make it back in time they are eliminated. (Eliminations: Janot of the Bears — who was brought back)

Magnetic Maze: Warriors are underneath a maze. Using a magnet to move another magnet on top towards the hole in the middle to earn stones.

Puzzle Count: Questions are on the wall to which the answer is a number. The warriors must step on squares whose combined totals equal the answer to the question. For each mistake a stone is lost.

River Rope: Warriors are in a coracle and use a rope to pull themselves along and take stones as they go but if they fall into the river or drift too far away from the ropes they are eliminated. There are two paths to take, an easier route and a harder one with two stones on each path. (Eliminations: Ahrdin of the Eagles — who was not brought back.)

The Chest: Warriors work together to use logs to move a large heavy chest towards various keys which are needed to open doors on it that contain stones. When they run out of time the chest disappears.

The Climb: Warriors climb up a rock using ropes to aid them collecting stones as they go. Once the time runs out all remaining stones disappear.

The Descent: Warriors abseil down a rockface into a boat collecting stones as they go.

Thrall Threads: Warriors step between threads which have small bells hung from them. They have to make it to the other side and collect stones as they go. If they ring a bell then the Tree Spirits eliminate them. (Eliminations: Lemec and Cermal of the Wolves — only Lemec was brought back as the team only had enough stones for one warrior, Halsem of the Otters — who was brought back, Janot of the Bears — who could not be brought back as he had already been eliminated, Kelin of the Eagles — who was brought back.)

White Water: Warriors are in a boat and paddle down rapids and attempt to collect stones as they go.

Rope Reach: The warriors have to collect stones from a rope bridge across a river. Three stones hang within reach of the ropes, but one goes down an unstable ladder and is much harder to retrieve. This one must be retrieved. (Eliminations: Kelin of the Eagles — second and therefore irreversible elimination)

| Spirit Trials | Day | Wolves | Stones | Bears | Stones | Otters | Stones | Eagles | Stones |
| Spirit Trials | 2 | White Water | 8 | Magnetic Maze | 9 | River Rope | 10 | Letter Path | 10 |
| Spirit Trials | 3 | Thrall Threads | 0 | White Water | 12 | Puzzle Count | 14 | Archers' Aim | 13 |
| Spirit Trials | 4 | The Descent | 4 | The Climb | 14 | Cursed Earth | 16 | Magnetic Maze | 17 |
| Spirit Trials | 5 | Puzzle Count | 8 | Long Board | 9 | Thrall Threads | 9 | The Chest | 20 |
| Spirit Trials | 6 | The Chest | 9 | Letter Path | 13 | Catapult Drop | 9 | Cursed Earth | 21 |
| Spirit Trials | 7 | Rope Reach | 12 | Thrall Threads | 17 | White Water | 12 | Catapult Drop | 22 |
| Spirit Trials | 8 | Long Board | 16 | Puzzle Count | 20 | Magnetic Maze | 12 | Thrall Threads | 18 |
| Spirit Trials | 9 | Magnetic Maze | 17 | Rope Reach | 24 | Letter Path | 16 | Puzzle Count | 22 |
| Spirit Trials | 10 | River Rope | 21 | Archers' Aim | 24 | Long Board | 20 | The Descent | 26 |
| Spirit Trials | 11 | Letter Path | 25 | The Chest | 27 | The Climb | 23 | White Water | 29 |
| Spirit Trials | 12 | The Climb | 28 | Catapult Drop | 27 | Rope Reach | 27 | River Rope | 31 |
| Spirit Trials | 13 | Archers' Aim | 29 | River Rope | 31 | The Descent | 30 | Long Board | 34 |
| Spirit Trials | 14 | Catapult Drop | 31 | Cursed Earth | 0 | The Chest | 34 | Rope Reach | 36 |
| Spirit Trials | 15 | Cursed Earth | 24 | The Descent (Not Taken) | 0 | Archers' Aim | 34 | The Climb | 39 |

=== Elimination Trial ===
The Torrent: This was a race through the river between six warriors, with the first four finishers qualifying to join Varan and Gydan of the Eagles because they had the most stones and went through to the porthole. As the Otters came 2nd with 34 stones they had a head start before the Wolves who came 3rd with 24 stones. In the remainder of the quest, it was Arkil who was 1st to go through, Hareb was 2nd, Lemec was 3rd and Vesak was 4th. It was close because he was in last place in most of the challenge but Halsem struggled to climb the waterfall. Halsem told Kasha that only one person could climb at a time allowing Vesak to catch up. He got the 2nd rope before Kasha did climb the waterfall and overtook Halsem when climbing the waterfall and just beat him to the plunge pool which leads to the porthole. Therefore, the last two warriors Halsem and Kasha were eliminated. Kasha would have got through had she climbed and Halsem not told her to.

=== Leadership tasks ===
The six "strongest, brightest and bravest" warriors continue their quest to destroy the Dragon's Eye, but first, they must take part in the final leadership trials to see who shall be their leader.

Long Throw: The warriors each have two attempts to throw a javelin as far as they can. The top four — in this case, Gydan, Arkil, Hareb and Lemec — move on to the next challenge.

Rock Range: The warriors throw three rocks at a target on the ground, trying to get as close to the centre as possible. If the rock does not enter the target, it will not count. The top two – in this case, Gydan and Lemec – move on to the final challenge.

Combat Ring: Each warrior must attempt to grab the cloth tied to their opponent's back. The warrior who wins the best of three bouts — in this case, Lemec — earns leadership of the final six.

=== The Final Trials ===
Day 17

River Raft: Using a crossbow and arrows with hooks, the warriors must drag a boat on a river to the shore so they can get in and journey downstream. Hareb was first to shoot and managed to snag a hooked arrow to a large ragged cloth on the boat. However, when the other warriors were pulling it to shore it got stuck to a nearby tree and the arrow came off. Varan was next to fire, but they could not dislodge it from the tree and the arrow fell into the river. Vesak was next to fire and managed to get the arrow in a hole in the cloth, dislodging it from the tree and getting it to shore.

River Escape: The warriors must now travel downstream and grab a ladder along the river (like the one in Rope Reach) and climb up it after securing it to the boat. This duty was befallen to leader Lemec who managed to secure the raft to the ladder so that the other warriors could get up it. If any of the warriors fall into the river, they will be lost to the quest. Vesak was trying to get onto the ladder but he did not secure his legs to the ladder and despite Lemec trying to pull him back into the boat, his grip gave in and he fell into the river, eliminating him.

Shuttle Line: Using a nearby zipline, the warriors must find a way to cross the river to the other side. However they need to set it up correctly as if any warriors fall in the river they will be lost. Hareb, Arkil and Lemec managed to set it up successfully and the warriors managed to get all the warriors across, despite the zipline needing effort to get them to shore.

Demon Shields: Using an unusual mechanism of blocks, the warriors must retrieve shields that will defend them from nearby demons. Lemec, Hareb, Gydan and Arkil managed to escape the demons by retrieving their respective shields, but Varan only just managed to escape after she could not unclip the shield from the rope holding the shield up.

Day 18

Demon Trap: Using long boards and paddles, the warriors must cross a lake to the other side of the bank as their path is blocked by quicksand. However, there are demons on the lake who are trying to catch the warriors. If they are caught, they are eliminated. Varan was the last to get her board into on the lake and could not paddle fast enough. She was caught by the demons, making her the second to fail on the journey to the Castle of Shadows.

Buried Treasure: Using symbols in the journal they received after the leadership challenges, they must find a series of parchments buried under a series of stones with the same symbols on them. However, they must be careful of approaching demons. Gydan and Arkil were given the responsibility of digging while Hareb and Lemec figured out the symbols. With the four parchments intact, they head to their next challenge. While this challenge is going on, Ervan and Nevar distract Raven and switch Raven's staff for a fake that Ervan crafted in an earlier day.

Magic Potion: The remaining warriors now must collect blocks so that they can send one warrior up the stack and retrieve a potion that will reveal what is on the blank parchment. Hareb was given the role of the climber while Lemec gives her the blocks and Gydan and Arkil were given the task of pulling a safety rope so that if Hareb falls, she'll be safe. They retrieve the potion and pour it on the parchments, revealing a map to The Castle of Shadows.

Golden Portal: The warriors must decipher an inscription on a stone using a letter guild in the journal. They figure out that the inscription is a riddle, 'In light I am seen, but in darkness, I am'. They figure out that the answer is shadow and Gydan is given the task of firing an arrow into a hole but misses. Hareb is then given the task and then activates the portal to the next part of their journey to the Dragon's Eye. Upon arriving in the Forgotten Kingdom, Raven discovers that his staff was swapped when he tries to destroy one of the guards.

Day 19

Demon Patrol: The four remaining warriors must construct a destroyed catapult while the demons patrol the castle perimeter meaning they have to hide when they come close enough that they can see the warriors. If they are spotted they are eliminated from the quest. Having built the catapult and found ammunition, the warriors hide as more guards approach them.

Catapult Attack: The warriors must use the catapult and the ammunition in order to fire at the patrolling demons to dispose them. Lemec is first to fire the catapult but misses and the warriors hide. Hareb is next but again misses, causing the warriors to hide again. Arkil is next to fire and manages to hit a demon, but another approaches as Gydan takes the catapult and disposes of the demon. Hareb takes aim again and fared much better than her first attempt. But the warriors hide again as another demon comes too close. Gydan manages to hit him and now they can advance after collecting the weapons that they were carrying.

The Gauntlet: Using the shields that they collected on day 17, the warriors must dodge and reflect the aim of the demons that stand on the castle walls above them. If they are hit by any missiles, they are eliminated. By Lemec's instructions, Arkil is told to go first, Gydan second, Hareb third and Lemec who went last. All the warriors survive to move to the castle entrance.

Blast Path: The warriors now face a dilemma. The warriors must enter the castle but using a pathway that has been trapped with noxious gas holes. Using the weapons that they collected at Catapult Attack, they must collect the cylinders that hang above their reach and place them in the holes. This challenge was a race, as the last warrior to cross the path would be taken by the gases. Arkil, Hareb and Gydan made it past the path, but leader Lemec could not place the cylinders fast enough and she was eliminated. However, they are now captured after Nevar forced them to enter without Raven, meaning they are trapped.

Day 20

Break Out: The warriors have been tied together and watched by a guard. When the demon begins to rest, the warriors escape from their ropes but they can not escape the room they are in until they get rid of the guard by the door. Arkil managed to conceal the journal and the warriors find a recipe for a potion that will vanquish demons. After they make the potion, they throw it onto the demon and he is no more, making their escape. During this challenge, Raven retrieves his real staff back after deflecting a shot by Nevar to Ervan who was holding it.

The Force: The final three warriors must now step onto a pathway of symbols that have three in one row and they must step onto the symbols at random and remember the way they have come. If they step on an incorrect symbol, they will be sent back to the start. The first warrior to finish will earn an advantage in the next challenges. That warrior being Arkil, as she managed to remember a symbol that she has stepped on, whereas Gydan (who was also on the same row) stepped onto the wrong symbol. He then finished 2nd and earned an advantage over Hareb as she was last to complete the path.

Deadly Ground: The warriors must now cross the castle courtyard by traversing an obstacle course that consists of a climbing net and slice, a balance beam with turning paddles to trip them up and a balance beam with pendulums swinging. Arkil is to go first then followed by Gydan and with Hareb bringing up the rear. Arkil only barely made it to the end as she slips while coming off the balance beam at the end. However, when Gydan slips like Arkil, his foot touches the deadly ground and he is eliminated just before he reaches the lair of the Eye. In the end, Hareb soon joins Arkil as they enter the Eye's lair.

The Lair: Now Hareb and Arkil must battle it out in a competition of bravery and fear. After entering a small tunnel cage face up, they must place their hands into 4 boxes containing maggots, snails, hedgehogs and millipedes as they try to find a key in just one of the boxes. Hareb is beaten to the key by Arkil and now only she remains to retrieve the Dragon's Eye. Once at the cage containing the Eye, Arkil must open it, despite rats scurrying around inside of the cage. Once she collects the Eye, she is teleported to the castle courtyard, where Raven is waiting. Ervan then shows up and reveals that it was he who wrote the journal that led Raven and Arkil to the Castle of Shadows. Demanding Arkil to give him the Eye, Ervan threatens the two with stones that were found with the Eye which are deadly upon contact with anything close to the Eye. However, Nevar appears and kills Ervan. Raven then takes the Eye from Arkil. Despite being briefly tempted by the power it possesses, he completes the mission and destroys it with his staff, with Nevar seemingly killed in the blast.

Arkil is then given a staff of gold by the Spirit Lord as a reward for Arkil's bravery and strength. She is then known as "Arkil, protector of the golden staff, savior of the spirits of the forest, hero of the Dragon's Eye".

As Raven and Arkil head off, Nevar is seen on top of the Castle of Shadows, not destroyed as thought.

== Warriors ==
Warriors are given 4, 5 or 6 letter names, chosen from letters from their real names. 16 warriors started the quest, and there are four teams of warriors. Each team has four members, with two boys and two girls in each, with the exception of the Wolves. The four leaders were chosen in leadership trials on day one. Lemec was also chosen to be the leader of the final week warriors after a series of trials, but was lost on the Blast Path, leaving no leader for the final day.

Warriors in blue cells made it through to the finals, and the warrior in gold was the winner. The warrior in second is silver and bronze for the third.

| Wolves | Warrior Name | Real Name | Elimination 1 | Elimination 2 | Result |
| Wolves | Lemec (Leader) | Amelia Welch | Thrall Threads | Blast Path^{+} | 4th |
| Wolves | Hareb | Phoebe Howard | Cursed Earth | The Lair^{+} | 2nd |
| Wolves | Arros | Simon Curran | Cursed Earth^{**} | | 9th |
| Wolves | Cermal | Emma Calvert | Thrall Threads^{*} | | 16th |

| Bears | Warrior Name | Real Name | Elimination 1 | Elimination 2 | Result |
| Bears | Larim (Leader) | Milo Clarke | Cursed Earth^{***} | | 11th |
| Bears | Janot | Benjamin Aston | Long Board | Thrall Threads | 15th |
| Bears | Nardel | Helen Richardson | Cursed Earth^{***} | | 10th |
| Bears | Miran | Erinna Harvey-Jamieson | Cursed Earth^{***} | | 12th |

| Otters | Warrior Name | Real Name | Elimination 1 | Elimination 2 | Result |
| Otters | Halsem (Leader) | Charlie Smith | Thrall Threads | The Torrent^{+} | 7th |
| Otters | Arkil | Harri Killick | | | 1st |
| Otters | Kasha | Hannah Takahashi | The Torrent^{+} | | 8th |
| Otters | Vesak | Jake Iveson | River Escape^{+} | | 6th |

| Eagles | Warrior Name | Real Name | Elimination 1 | Elimination 2 | Result |
| Eagles | Varan (Leader) | Brogan Evans | Demon Trap^{+} | | 5th |
| Eagles | Ahrdin | Lisa Hardin | River Rope^{**} | | 14th |
| Eagles | Kelin | Sam Kinley | Thrall Threads | Rope Reach | 13th |
| Eagles | Gydan | Aidan Donaghey | Deadly Ground^{+} | | 3rd |

*Not enough stones to be brought back.
**Team chose not to bring warrior back.
***Entire team eliminated in one challenge.
+Eliminated on one of the final challenges, with no option to be brought back.

== See also ==
- Raven (game show)
- Raven: The Island
- Raven: The Secret Temple
