= Gary Mullen =

Gary Mullen may refer to:

- Gary Mullen (singer), Freddie Mercury sound-alike and Stars in Their Eyes winner
- Gary Mullen (American football) (born 1963), former American football and Arena football player
