= David Hayman Jr. =

Scottish film director

- Occupation: Film director
- Years active: 2010–present
- Notable work: Wasted Time; River City; Nursery Chymes

David Hayman Jr. is a film director from Glasgow, Scotland.

== Life and career ==
David Hayman Jr. left school at the age of 16 to study a sports coaching course in Glasgow. By the time Hayman was 18, he got involved in a media programme called the Govan Initiative which gave him his first taste of film production. In 2014, after working on various production roles on River City, he was offered the chance to direct his very first episode of the television series.

In the same year, Hayman began working on directing his first feature film Wasted Time. The film tells the story of a Glaswegian prisoner at Barlinnie Prison who is wrongly accused of a crime he did not commit. The film had its world premiere at the 2015 edition of the Glasgow Film Festival.

In 2015, Hayman turned to the stage to co-direct a revival of John Byrne's classic play The Slab Boys. The production, featuring both his father (David Hayman) and brother (Sammy Hayman) played at the Citizens Theatre for three weeks in Glasgow before going on tour. TBR Scotland described the production as 'A solid and satisfying production with plenty of laugh-out loud humour'.

== Filmography ==
=== Film ===
Year	Film	Credited as			Notes
Year	Film	Director	Producer	Editor	Notes
2010	Little Green Bag		Yes	Yes	Short Film
2011	Nursery Chymes	Yes	Yes	Yes	Short Film
2014	Wasted Time	Yes		Yes	Short Film; Co-Directed with Moe Abutoq

=== Television ===
Year	Title	Role	Notes
2014	River City	Director	1 Episode
2018	The Break	Director	1 Episode

=== Theatre ===
Year	Title	Role	Notes
2015	The Slab Boys	Co-Director	
