= Moe Abutoq =

Scottish film director

- Occupation: Film director
- Years active: 2009–present
- Notable work: Wasted Time; River City; Nursery Chymes

Moe Abutoq is a Scottish film director and film producer. His debut started on the Scottish Television series River City where he has directed a number of episodes for BBC Scotland from 2014 onwards. In 2015, he co directed the feature film Wasted Time with longtime collaborator David Hayman Jr. The film tells the story of a Glaswegian prisoner at Barlinnie Prison who is wrongly accused of a crime he did not commit. The film, featuring Scottish actor David Hayman was shot over a fortnight on a budget of £12,000 and marked the first feature for Shooter Films. Wasted Time had its world premiere at the 2015 edition of the Glasgow Film Festival. In 2017, he was appointed as Director of the revised series of the BBC children's programme Raven.

== Filmography ==
=== Film ===
Year	Film	Credited as				Notes
Year	Film	Director	Producer	Editor	Actor	Notes
2009	Wasted					EPK Team
2010	Little Green Bag		Yes	Yes	Yes	Short Film
2011	Nursery Chymes		Yes			Short Film
2014	Wasted Time	Yes	Yes			Short Film; Co-Directed with David Hayman Jr.

=== Television ===
Year	Title	Role	Notes
2014	River City	Director	2 Episodes
2017	Raven	Director	15 Episodes
