= Raven (game show) =

British children's adventure game show first aired in 2002

- Raven title card (2017–2018)
- Genre: Children's game show
- Presented by: James Mackenzie (2002–2010); Aisha Toussaint (2017–2018)
- Starring: James Mackenzie
- Music by: David Brockett (Series 1-10)
- Country of origin: United Kingdom
- Original language: English
- No. of series: 15 (12 regular, 3 spin-offs)
- No. of episodes: 290

Production
- Running time: 30 minutes
- Production company: BBC Scotland

Original release
- Network: CBBC
- Release: 16 December 2002 – 11 March 2010
- Release: 4 December 2017 – 12 June 2018

Related
- Raven: The Island; Raven: The Secret Temple; Raven: The Dragon's Eye

Raven is a BBC Scotland children's adventure game show. It originally aired on CBBC in the United Kingdom from 16 December 2002 to 11 March 2010, over the course of 10 series, with three spin-offs. In the original release, the show was hosted by James Mackenzie who played the title role, and conducted a group of 6 children, known as warriors, over 5 days through a series of tasks and feats. At various stages in the adventure, the group loses the least successful warrior, until two go through to the final week to compete for the title of Ultimate Warrior.

The series returned in 2017 with Aisha Toussaint as the new Raven and host, with Mackenzie's character also appearing in the show, renamed as "Raven of Old". 2 series were commissioned and filming began in July 2017 with the eleventh series starting on 4 December 2017, and a twelfth series later airing on 4 June 2018. No further series were commissioned afterwards. The revived series sees Raven conducting four warriors over three days and 1 goes through to the final week to compete for the title of True Warrior.

== Format ==
=== Series 1–10 ===
This format of the show features three groups of six warriors who compete in various challenges over the course of three (broadcast) weeks. Each group features for 5 days, and after the second day, the warrior with the fewest lives and rings must face the Way of the Warrior, an elimination challenge deciding whether they would continue to the next day or not. Only two warriors in each week go through to compete in the final week of the quest, where one becomes the Ultimate Warrior.

Each warrior starts out with a number of lives, represented by feathers on a standard. The number of lives started was 7 from Series 1–3, and this changed to 9 lives from Series 4–10. From Series 5, warriors with a full number of lives intact could gain further lives with 9 rings, whereas they couldn't beforehand. Warriors also received symbolic emblems that follow them throughout their quest (Sun, Mountain, Tree, Wave, Cloud, and Moon). Losing any challenge meant the loss of a life, but these could be won back, by winning at least 7 (Series 2–3), later 9, gold rings, although in Series 1, the final day's challenges were played to win back lives. To lose all lives from a standard meant the warrior would be automatically eliminated from the process, though this never occurred.

At the end of days 1–4 (Series 1, Series 7 final week), days 2–4 (Series 2–10 heats, Series 4–6 final week), and 5 in the final weeks in Series 2–3, 8–10, the warrior with the fewest lives and rings must face the Way of the Warrior, a complex and difficult series of obstacles that only four warriors, (Ishal, Varna, Worjo and Kinsa), have ever completed. Only in Series 1 that warriors volunteer to do the challenge but in the first day, no-one was sent home. Should a warrior reach the portal at the end of the Way of the Warrior, they will be admitted through to the next day of the quest, and the task must then fall upon the next warrior with the fewest lives and rings. This process continues until somebody is eliminated. If there was a tie on lives and rings, a drawing of feathers decides which one would face the challenge, that warrior being the one who picked the black feather.

=== Series 11–12 ===
Raven (II) conducts four groups of four warriors (the Bears, the Wolves, the Wild Cats, and the Stags), similar to the spin-off shows, in a three-day chunk in which they start off with six rings. They would lose one if they were claimed by a demon and Raven rescued them from Nevar's realm with her staff of power, instead of the feathered lives seen previously. The warrior with the fewest rings leaves at the end of the second day, leaving the three remaining warriors to face off against each other in The Last Stand on the third day. Whoever wins The Last Stand proceeds to represent their group in the Grand Tournament. In the Grand Tournament, the format is similar to the heats with the warrior with the fewest rings leaving on the second day and the remaining three facing off in the Tournaments version of The Last Stand. The winner earns the title of a True Warrior and becomes part of Raven's army to eventually take down Nevar permanently.

== Cast ==
Raven (James Mackenzie): Originally from the Island of Alaunus, Raven is an ancient, immortal Scottish warlord and the warriors' guide throughout the quest; his name refers to his ability to shape-shift from a raven to a human and back. He can read the warriors' thoughts, usually from the Raven's Eye in his staff of power, and he recaps what has happened previously on the quest, and both gives and takes away the warriors' lives from their standards. He has an elaborate style of speech, which has generated some catchphrases, including, "Are you ready? Then let the challenge... begin", and, "May the luck of the Raven's Eye be with you". Since the eleventh tournament began, the character's name was altered to 'Raven of Old', with his staff of power having been passed on to the new Raven. He also provides commentary on the challenges in all series except Series 11, and during series 12 is shown watching the warriors using a talisman that the winner of Series 11 was said to have procured for him.

Raven (II) (Aisha Toussaint): In Series 11 and 12, Aisha Toussaint plays Raven, sharing the same name as Mackenzie's character. Originally one of Raven of Old's warriors, she fought alongside him in the final battle against Nevar, during which he was banished to a desolate realm. However, Nevar used six magic symbols he had crafted in order to banish Raven of Old to the same realm with him. Upon finding the original six symbols, she recovered Raven of Old's staff of power, which transformed to a different shape, and became 'Raven' in the process. She now leads the warriors through the eleventh and twelfth tournaments, and the catchphrase of the previous tournaments said by Raven of Old returned. She is able to use her staff to temporarily summon Raven of Old from the desolate realm, whenever she is in need of guidance.

Nevar: A mysterious figure who wears a black-hooded cloak and an iron mask, introduced in the 2nd series and described as the enemy of all that is good and true, and Raven's arch enemy. While the forging of the six golden symbols returned magic to Raven's homeland, it also brought the vile scourge of Nevar, whose sole aim is to defeat Raven and conquer the land. All that can be seen of Nevar's true form is his eyes, which have red irises and red-pink, scorched skin around them. He is also responsible for the demons featuring heavily in the warrior's tasks in an attempt to impede their progress. He only appears in person in The Last Stand as Guardian of the Portal, where he attempts to stop the remaining warriors from reaching the portal. In Series 9 and 10's Last Stands, he has also shown he has the power of teleportation. Nevar returns in Series 11 with a new staff (resembling a bird's skull) and demonic mask featuring horns and covering his entire face, having been defeated in the final battle by Raven and his ultimate warriors. He was banished to a desolate realm, but forged symbols of his own to combat Raven's magic and thus banished his nemesis alongside him. From this point on, he attempts to escape from his realm and conquer the lands once more, as Raven II tries to thwart him.

Demons: most of the Demons featured in the show are Nevar's silent servants. In such capacity, they will do all in their power to destroy Raven and his warriors, and keep them from collecting the gold that they seek. Many different variants have been seen (some being named in challenge names), although they are all humanoid, dressed in uniform brown cloaks and cowls which completely obscure their features; however, in Series 1, they have ordinary human hands and feet, and when their hands are seen subsequently, they are very black. In the revival series, the Demons all dress in black. Regardless, virtually all Demons have the power to eliminate warriors merely by touching them if they fail in a challenge, such as by touching the ground when this is not allowed, or taking too long to accomplish a goal. The Demons seen in the revival series all have a deadly stare.

Troll:

=== Spin-off characters ===
In Raven: The Island, Princess Erina was introduced as a childhood friend of Raven, along with her companion, a blue spirit named Haryad, that kept watch over the warriors safety and progress. Raven appeared in this series only in a guest capacity, mainly in scenes with another new character, the astronomer Cyrus. The spin-off reveals Nevar's backstory: he has ruled the island with his dark magic for four years, making Staffs of Power from the Enchanted Oak to arm his Demons, in order to stop the warriors from reaching the fortress. Nevar was once a normal human, no more than an upstart baron with a band of brigands as his followers, and considered no more than an irritation on Alaunus. However, he became twisted and corrupt when he stole the Enchanted Oak and used it to create a Staff of Power for himself; as a result, each time he uses his staff for evil, half of his remaining life-force is taken away, taking its toll on his mind and his body. His iron mask and his cloak hides his scarred, burnt face, marks given to him from a battle with Raven. Until the third series, his mask resembled many small pieces of metal covering his face, before becoming a full metal mask in the fourth series. Nevar's backstory is slightly retconned in the revival series, as Raven of Old often refers to him as a sorcerer.

In Raven: The Secret Temple, Nevar followed Raven to a mysterious land far to the east after putting a dark spell on Raven's homeland and leaving it in his icy grip. Raven and the warriors travelled to the east to find the magical waters that could break this spell. In this series, a new character Satyarani was introduced, and she acted as a guide to the warriors and as assistance to Raven throughout the course of this quest, in the journey to find The Secret Temple. At the conclusion of this series, Nevar is thought to have been slain, until the last 10 seconds of the show, where he is shown to have survived.

In Raven: The Dragon's Eye, Nevar's pursuit continues. He plans to retrieve the mystical Dragon's Eye, which Raven and his warriors attempt to find first. The Eye was said to be a stone of great evil that could grant it's wielder ultimate power, and Raven and the warriors sought to destroy it before it could fall into Nevar's hands. A new character, Ervan was introduced in this series, and he took on the role and persona of Raven's assistant and a very occasional guide to the warriors, but his motivations and intentions were frequently in question and he changed sides regularly between Raven and Nevar. It appeared in the conclusion, that he was neither side and was working solely to claim the Eye for himself, hoping to get Raven and Nevar to kill each other in the process. Ervan was also exposed as the warrior who had traveled through the Forgotten Kingdom and wrote the journal detailing how to get through the land. Nevar was again thought to have been destroyed, but was shown once again to have survived following the final end credits.

== Warriors ==
Warrior emblems in Raven from the second to tenth series, designs from series 4–10 displayed

Warriors are given four to seven-letter names composed from letters selected from their real names. Each warrior is given a standard with their lives and rings displayed upon it.

From series 2 to series 10, there are six emblems and colours to represent the warriors: a red outfit containing a sun, a white outfit containing a cloud, a yellow outfit containing a mountain, a green outfit containing a tree, a blue outfit containing a wave, and a grey outfit containing a moon. The emblems were introduced from the second series. The first series featured no emblems, but sashes of the colours: Mauve, Light Blue, Green, Black, Olive and Light Brown. In series 1, warriors that progressed wore the same kit unless more than one wearing that kit progressed, whereby the others used a different sash. In series 2–10, every contestant that progressed wore a different symbol and colour in the final, e.g., in Series 5, three warriors wearing the cloud progressed to the final from their heat, so all had to wear a different symbol and colour in the final week. Every series had at least one symbol qualify twice, though warriors wearing five of them qualified in series 6, 7, 9 and 10. Series 11 onwards uses four different colours on the group of warriors: blue, yellow, green and red, with their animal symbol stencilled on the front in black, and all wearing black trousers. Those who make it through to the finals week wear black tunics to match their trousers, with their animal symbol stencilled on the front in white.

The designs of the emblems varied and changed, particularly between series 2 and 4, but have remained the same emblems (e.g.: between series 2 and 4, the moon and water changed direction). In the prologue to the seventh series, it was revealed that the symbols were "forged long ago, from gold, cooled in water drawn from the deepest loch" in order to vanquish the darkness that overshadowed the land. On completion of the final symbol, light and sorcery returned to the land before the evil Nevar appeared, who tried to return the land to darkness.

=== Ultimate/True Warriors ===
The winners from each series are known as an Ultimate Warrior. Their prize is a warrior's "heart's desire" – in certain cases this proved to be a holiday of some sort – and from the second series, the Ultimate Warrior was also presented with a Staff of Power and the three finalists all won a trophy. From Series 11 onwards, the title was renamed from Ultimate Warrior to True Warrior.

Ultimate Warriors and Finalists
Series	Winner	Emblem	Second	Emblem	Third	Emblem	Fourth	Emblem	Fifth	Emblem	Sixth	Emblem
1	Lamar		Intho		Brhea		Bryal		Halei		Hadan	
2	Grema		Varna		Kinia		Napat		Ishal		Ersca	
3	Jaddo		Worjo		Brena		Cullin		Nosoo		Sharka	
4	Linma		Dejan		Kinsa		Wilga		Sarla		Wenra	
5	Arnor		Kyson		Molyn		Obra		Suhan		Sonlu	
6	Kenat		Nejad		Rohak		Tezan		Tonesh		Kerud	
7	Versad		Hanso		Danil		Sonos		Beron		Lenat	
8	Pargan		Phidel		Druan		Milex		Rimah		Sarpes	
9	Dyrel		Bertar		Tridic *		Javmay		Reggos		Japul	
10	Sarjed		Limonn		Coprov		Grolath		Norpal		Cleral	

True Warriors and Finalists
Series	Winner	Heat	Second	Heat	Third	Heat	Fourth	Heat
11	Nantin	Wolves	Janra	Wildcats	Cersage	Stags	Larsai	Bears
12	Sotteo	Wildcats	Cahira	Wolves	Karpel	Bears	Axra	Stags

*Replaced Yenja during Series 9, Week 3, Day 2 (episode 12).

== Challenges ==
The many challenges the warriors faced have varied over time and some challenges are used only in certain series, whereas some have featured in every series, i.e. Deep Loch, Leap of Faith, Riddle Bridge, and the Way of the Warrior. All the challenges in the quest test a variety of virtues, such as strength, agility, and teamwork, depending on the challenge. Warriors play challenges to win treasure rings, and should they fail the challenge, they will forfeit any rings gained in the challenge, as well as lose one of their lives. There were some exceptions for this rule, for example in Dragon's Roost, Dark Path, Pole Climb, Treetop Treasure, and others, warriors could keep any rings they collected during the challenge. But the overriding rule was that if they lost the challenge, they would definitely lose a life.

=== Way of the Warrior (Series 1–10) ===
The Way of the Warrior features in the first ten series and was faced at the end of most days, used to test a warrior to the limits and fell upon the warrior with the fewest lives and rings on their standard at the end of the day, thereby being an elimination challenge. The warrior chosen to complete the challenge must remain on the golden path at all times – should they fall from the path or be struck by any obstacles, they will lose their (often final) life. It consists of many obstacles designed to knock the warrior off the path, and the configuration consisted of swinging dummies, falling rocks being pushed by demons, a swinging gate, a swinging boulder carousel, a narrow beam with sharp objects and spikes falling down. The warriors then released a drawbridge to the next part of the challenge that consisted of a 3 shield section, sometimes with 4 shields, later changed to 3, followed by a spiky swinging barrel with golden ropes to crawl across. The last part of the challenge consisted of swinging blades/axes. From the third series onwards, gnashing jaws were adding to the end of the challenge. The victor would pass through the golden portal and would compete in the next day of the quest. The burden then fell upon the next warrior with the fewest lives and rings. This process continues until one warrior is eliminated.

When the show's filming location changed to Aviemore in the eighth series, the challenge underwent major transformation. While the format remained essentially the same, it was livened up a bit, consisting of new obstacles such as a falling balance walkway releasing falling rocks, skull shields, and spinning sharp blades.

The challenge did not return in the revived series.

==== Victors ====
The pass rate for this challenge was not high, and only four warriors in history have ever completed the challenge. They were:

- Ishal (Series 2, Week 3, Day 4 (episode 14)), leaving Dyasa to attempt the challenge. (Ishal repeated the challenge in Week 4 Day 3 (episode 18) but failed to complete it.)
- Varna (Series 2, Week 4, Day 5 (episode 20)), leaving Kinia to attempt the challenge.
- Worjo (Series 3, Week 4, Day 5 (episode 20)), leaving Brena to attempt the challenge.
- Kinsa (Series 4, Week 4, Day 2 (episode 17)), leaving Wenra to attempt the challenge.

None of the contestants were able to complete the challenge following Series 4.

=== The Last Stand (Series 2–12) ===
==== Series 2–10 ====
Introduced in the second series, this challenge originally consisted of the two warriors in first and second place faced each other to collect and assemble four components of a key from a battlefield and avoid being blasted by Nevar's lightning. Each warrior entered this challenge with however many lives they had on their standard at the end of the day, and being blasted would make them lose a life; they are eliminated if they lose all their lives. The winner is the first to use their constructed key to open the portal and go through to the next stage of the quest. A second round is then played with the loser of the first round racing against the warrior in third place. Only two warriors would pass through the portal to the next stage of the quest. This format of The Last Stand featured in the third series as well.

From the fourth series, the Last Stand was changed into an assault course for the three remaining warriors, their remaining lives and rings determining the relative time they are released from their starting cages. Once released from the starting cages the warriors retrieve a lever, they must then use this lever to knock down the inflatable objects that are in their way, after this the warriors must engage the lever into the slot which will vanquish the first demon that is stood before them. Once vanquishing the first demon the warriors must collect a circular disk, they must scale a wall and crawl under a framework maze before matching the symbols on the podium, this will allow them to pick up a cylinder containing symbols, which they must attach to rope; after climbing up a waterfall and sliding down with the cylinder, it must be placed correctly in the slot to activate the portal to escape. After one warrior has taken out all their demons, Nevar attempts to attack the two remaining warriors; when two warriors have gone through the portal, his next shot causes instant elimination to the remaining warrior. In the final, the first warrior to go through the portal wins and the remaining two are blasted by Nevar.

The challenge has undergone multiple changes and developments. From Series 5–7, warriors had to drag a key across an overhead maze to unlock a cage containing puzzle pieces, which are assembled to vanquish the demon in their path. Much of the rest of the challenge remained the same, except a cylinder of symbols replaced the circular disc.

From series 8–10, with the show's move to being filmed in Aviemore, meant that many of the original features of Castle Toward had gone from the show, and this included the Last Stand which appeared significantly more brighter and colourful than the bleakness of the challenge depicted from prior series. This time the challenge featured two large ramps to carry letters for a word puzzle (in Series 9 and 10, the word puzzle was changed to a shape puzzle forming a bridge that led to a shield). The shield was depicted as protection from Nevar's fire, and only the emblems would destroy the demons in their path. After the ramp part, they faced a framework with ropes attached to form a maze to crawl through, followed by another two emblem shape pieces to collect each. There was then two diamond walls with a hand battering ram to smash through them, with the last two emblem shaped pieces beyond. A different ram hung from chains to burst open a final gate, after which the portal may be accessed. The warriors held the shield up towards Nevar to protect themselves as Nevar fired down at them, as they ran through the portal.

==== Series 11–12 ====
In both series 11 and 12, two versions of the course were built. The first one, that was used during the heats, remains nearly identical to Series 9 – 10's variation with a few noticeable differences. The pieces to build the ramp to the shields are already on the other side of the initial two ramps, the shields serve to only shield the warriors from the Demons instead of Nevar's line of fire (with four symbols instead of six only being present by the second row of Demons), the two diamond walls are replaced by a three spiked gate opened by a Skull tether and a talisman is collected after the final door is burst open in order to drop a boulder that blocks the way to the Portal.

The second version was used as the final challenge during the grand tournament, and is completely different to all the past incarnations. The course is suspended above a large pool of water and the aim was the warriors had to collect 8 out of 12 of their respective pieces, that are scattered all over the course, and put them into a wheel that would expel Nevar from the arena. The warriors could collect any of the pieces in any order but they can only carry a maximum of two at a time.

=== Other challenges ===
Ascent (Series 8): Played only once, a race to the top of a hill.

Battering Ram (Series 5–7, 11–12): Two teams of three warriors compete to manoeuvre large battering rams in front of a door. The winning team is the first to break down the door. Series 11 introduces added treasure rings along the path and demons chasing the teams from behind.

Battle of the Boats (Series 5–7): A kayak race across a loch to retrieve treasure rings on the opposite bank. Originally an individual challenge, it was changed to a team challenge in Series 7 with added treasure rings and hazards on the water.

Blasted Mountain (Series 1–7): Warriors must haul a pallet of puzzle pieces up a small hill, then assemble the statue (Series 1–4) or shield (Series 5–6) from the pieces, all while a wall of fire is approaching from the nearby erupting volcano. In Series 1 the first to assemble their statue and shield the other players behind it will win a life while the others receive no penalty. In subsequent series any players that have failed to assemble their statue or shield in time will lose a life. Known as Burning Mountain in Series 1. In Series 7 the Blasted Mountain was still a prime location but Raven would lead the warriors inside the mountain to face certain challenges along the way.

Boulder Run (Series 7): A solo challenge where warriors push a large boulder through a series of tunnels, while collecting rings and avoiding traps. Behind them is a demon rolling an anti-ship mine towards them.

Burning Battlements (Series 2–3, 5–6): A solo challenge where warriors catapult ice balls to put out fires in the castle wall. Warriors must hit at least one fire within the time limit to avoid losing a life. Series 6 removes the time limit, instead placing a limit on the number of balls.

Cliff Face (Series 7): Warriors scale the face of a cliff while collecting three treasure rings at various points. Collecting the first ring spawns a demon that gives chase. Getting caught by the demon or failing to collect a ring loses a life.

Conundrum (Series 9–12): A team challenge, originally played in pairs but later changed to teams. One warrior assembles two jigsaw puzzles, which reveal clues that the other must use to identify chests containing treasure rings within a time limit. In Series 11 this changes to one warrior communicating the clue to all of the others.

Cursed Chasm (Series 11–12): Warriors race in pairs across a river while suspended on wires. There are optional treasure rings to collect, but only the winner may keep the rings they collect.

Dark Path (Series 2–4): Pairs of blindfolded warriors must navigate a safe path through a forest by vines. Warriors must take care to keep to their vine and avoid false paths marked with a skull. The winner is the first to reach the end.

Dead Man's Vault (Series 6): Two warriors work together to guide a ball through a maze set in a locked door. The maze also contains traps, which immediately end the challenge if tripped. This challenge was always played on the first day of the week.

Deep Loch (Series 1–10): A swim across a freezing lake; warriors must race their competitors to the other side. The warrior that comes last or fails to finish loses a life. In Series 9 and 10, the format was changed to swimming to a pontoon in the middle of the lake, then back to the starting line.

Demon Army (Series 7–12): Teams of three warriors man a catapult to fire missiles at demons advancing towards a post with treasure rings. One of the demons respawns once when hit and must be fired at twice. The challenge ends in failure if one demon reaches the rings.

Demon Causeway (Series 4): Three warriors are placed on a 7x7 grid with a warrior at each corner, a golden square in the fourth, and two demons standing guard. The warriors and the demons take it in turns to move one square; the warriors can move in any direction but the demons cannot move backwards. If a demon steps into the same square as a warrior, that person is eliminated. Warriors must evade the demons and make their way to the golden square.

Demon Causeway (Series 10–12): Although sharing a name with another challenge, this challenge is very different. Warriors must navigate between stumps by laying planks to reach treasure rings suspended above them. If they step onto the ground, touch a demon or drop a ring at any time they are eliminated. Series 11 onwards includes demons chasing competitors across the stumps.

Demon River (Series 8): Warriors must each cross a river via two tightropes while avoiding the demons below.

Demon Square, later renamed to Demon Path (Series 2–12): A trivia and knowledge challenge; warriors are posed a number of true or false questions by the Tree of Wisdom, and must step on coloured squares depending on what they think the answer is. If they are correct they move forward, if they are wrong they stay put. A demon follows from behind and too many wrong answers will result in capture. Warriors who make it to the end of the path win a ring.

Demon Star (Series 8): Five demons stand on a pentagram, each covering a symbol. As they disappear, one warrior must read the symbol and communicate it to their partner in a separate room to spell out on a wall. Each correct word grants one ring, two mistakes costs both warriors a life.

Dragon's Blood (Series 2–5): One of three challenges housed in the Wizard's Tower. Warriors navigate a horizontal pole through a maze while hooking saucers of green liquid along the way. The aim is to bring all four saucers to the chest in the middle without spilling any of the liquid. In series 5 the number of saucers is reduced to two.

Dragon's Roost (Series 2–3, appears as Pole Climb in Series 4–5): Pairs of warriors race up a ladder to retrieve treasure rings from a nest at the top. In some cases there are more rings to collect along the way. Unusually any rings collected by the losing player are not forfeited. This challenge was replaced in Series 4 with Pole Climb after the tree the challenge on set was struck by lightning.

Dwarf Mine (Series 4–6): Set in an unstable mine, pairs of warriors try to knock down pit props with symbols drawn on with one warrior describing the symbols to the other. All four props with rings must be knocked down to win, but knocking down too many incorrect props will cause the mine to collapse.

Elixir of Life (Series 11–12): A water pouring puzzle played in pairs; warriors must measure out four units of liquid using two jugs, one holding three units, the other holding five.

Enchanted Stream (Series 3–4): A head-to-head race to build a bridge over a stream using puzzle pieces. Players must work quickly to avoid a mist that creeps over the stream.

Fire Demon (Series 2 & 6): Each warrior, while blindfolded, uses an ice stick to extinguish a fireball conjured by a demon before the flame engulfs them. In the final week of Series 2, the demon creates two fireballs.

Fire Water (Series 7): Each warrior uses a catapult to fire rocks at a platform in the centre of a lake. Each hit produces a treasure ring while three misses will lose a life.

Forest of Chains (Series 1–2): Warriors start off chained to trees and must free themselves by retrieving keys using nearby hooked poles. The first to open both locks chaining them wins a ring.

Forest of Golden Orbs (Series 11–12): Warriors have a bow and four arrows and must shoot at floating balloons. Each balloon hit grants a treasure ring.

Giant Shield (Series 1): This challenge is only ever played once in the final of Series 1. Warriors have one minute to navigate a ball through a tilting maze. If the ball falls into a trap they start from the beginning.

Gold Rush (Series 3): One of three challenges housed in the Wizard's Tower. Three warriors go head-to-head to build paths along the floor to a vent using puzzle pieces.

High Walk, also known in Series 5 and 6 as High Rope, and as Ring Reach after Series 8 (Series 1–3, 5–10): A bridge (or a rope in Series 5–6) is suspended high up between two trees. Warriors must each cross from one tree to the other, aided by hanging ropes. There are treasure rings suspended at various points along the way. The original bridge was originally retired after Series 3 and replaced with a rope, but was brought back for Series 7 after the High Rope tree was struck by lightning and deemed unsafe. Following the move to a new location in Series 8, the game was rebranded as Ring Reach.

Hunt for the Standard (Series 1): The first challenge on Day 1 of each week except for the final. Warriors must follow a series of coloured markers to find their standards that accompany them for the rest of the series. The first four to reach their standard leave unscathed while the remaining two lose a life.

Idol Wise (Series 11–12): Warriors must identify pairs of idols by the symbols printed on their underside while leaving four unique ones. Added challenges include a time limit and idols that automatically grant or remove rings.

Key Descent (Series 8): Pairs of warriors work together to bring a key and a pair of locked boxes down a cliff face within a time limit.

Lava Pit (Series 7): Set in the heart of The Blasted Mountain, warriors must fish coloured skulls out of the lava using poles. The first to retrieve ten skulls escapes the eruption that follows.

Leap of Faith (Series 1–12): Warriors each scale a tree or pole to a platform high up, then jump off while trying to grab hanging rings. In Series 1 and 7 the warriors must successfully catch the rings to avoid losing a life, but in others there is no penalty for missing the ring. Warriors who are unable to jump due to fear of heights will also lose a life. This is one of only two challenges to have appeared in every series of Raven.

Loch Leap (Series 7): Similar to Leap of Faith, this is set at ground level and warriors must take a running jump off a jetty into the lake. Warriors must catch at least one ring during the jump.

Long Staff (Series 1–8): A combat challenge where two warriors try to knock each other off balance beams or platforms. The winner then stays on to face the next competitor until all warriors have fought.

Loom Labyrinth (Series 11–12): A puzzle where warriors pull levers to drop rings, while trying not to drop the skulls that hang among them.

Magnetic Maze (Series 11–12): Warriors work together in pairs to move statues around a maze using magnets underneath. The person operating the magnets cannot see where they are going and must be guided by their partner.

Millstone Towers (Series 3–5): Warriors compete in two groups of three to build a tower out of millstones to reach a lever. The millstones must be carried through a gauntlet of dragon eggs, which freeze the players temporarily if they are knocked down and broken.

Nevar's Eye (Series 5–6): Warriors compete head to head to race blindfolded along a path using only a stick to navigate. If they step off the path or are caught by the two demons patrolling the area they are eliminated.

Orb Race (Series 11–12): Pairs of warriors inside zorbing balls race down a hill. Rings are collected by navigating between posts.

Pool Plunge (Series 9–12): Warriors attempt to gather rings suspended over a river using a floating pole, before diving into the water.

Puzzle Stack (Series 8): Warriors compete to haul puzzle pieces out of the loch and assemble them into a set of steps to reach treasure rings.

Raven's Rock (Series 8–12): Warriors must climb down a cliff while retrieving treasure rings encased in ice. Depending on the series they are either racing head-to-head or trying to outrun a demon that gives chase after finding the first ring. In series 8–10, the bottom two warriors face off to see who faces the final challenge of the day. From series 11, every warrior participates.

Riddle Bridge, also known as Riddle Rocks, Riddle Path, and Vale of Dunan (Series 1–12): Two warriors work together to solve riddles put to them by spelling the answer on lettered tiles on the ground. This and Leap of Faith are the only challenges to make an appearance in every series.

Riddle of the Portal (Series 1): Always played as the final challenge at the end of the heat weeks, a riddle is carved into an archway. Warriors take it in turns to speak their answer into a nearby rock, and a portal opens for them if their answer is correct. Warriors who enter the portal are transported to the final.

Riddle of the Raven's Eye (Series 1): Played only once, this serves as the final challenge of the series and the mechanism of awarding the grand prize. The Raven's Eye, an artifact shown throughout the series, is placed alongside two identical duplicates and the warrior in first place guesses which one is genuine based on voice clues produced by all three. Had they guessed incorrectly, the runner up would have gone next, however the one time this challenge was played, the leader guessed correctly.

Ring Climb (Series 2): Pairs of warriors compete to climb up a series of large wicker rings to the top. The winner gets a treasure ring while the loser forfeits a life.

Ring Rack (Series 6–10): A tug-of-war style physical challenge, warriors must pull on a lever to reveal treasure rings while their opponent is pulling in the opposite direction. This challenge was retired after Series 10 after one competitor injured herself and had to be replaced.

Ring Rock (Series 3): Similar to Enchanted Stream and Gold Rush, players compete to assemble a puzzle and earn a treasure ring.

River Slalom (Series 11–12): Warriors in kayaks navigate a section of river avoiding skulls and collecting all seven rings within the time limit.

Scramble, also known as Warriors' Race (Series 11–12): a variant of Ascent, warriors race down a hill, retrieve a treasure ring, then climb back the way they came.

Serpent's Eye (Series 3–6): A simple archery challenge. Warriors shoot three arrows each into a target using a longbow. The warriors must hit the target at least once to pass, and hitting the green serpent's eye in the middle will award treasure rings. From Series 4, hitting the red serpent around the edge of the target is an automatic failure, even if they previously managed to hit the target elsewhere.

Skull Cage (Series 7): Similar to the game KerPlunk, warriors remove jousting poles from a wire cage to dislodge giant skulls, while taking care not to let the red skulls fall to the ground.

Skull Rings (Series 8): A blindfolded warrior is guided by their partner along a maze to skulls, which must be broken open to reveal treasure rings.

Skull River (Series 8): Warriors paddle a canoe along a river through a series of gateways.

Snake Pit (Series 4): Teams of warriors must use planks to cross over a pit filled with snakes. Individuals who fall will lose a life, but their team may still win if the other members make it across.

Spider Tunnel (Series 1–3): Warriors tied together in pairs climb through a tunnel filled with giant spider webs and collect the rings inside before the timer runs out. A variant of this challenge played in the final week involves carrying a treasure chest through the cobwebs, sometimes retrieving a key from the tunnels.

Spider's Web (Series 7, 11–12): Warriors race head to head to climb to the top of a giant spider's web.

Spider's Wood (Series 6): Similar to Snake Pit, warriors cross a hazardous area using planks. This version is played against a timer rather than competitively.

Stepping Stones (Series 1–2, 5–6): Warriors cross a series of unstable stepping stones. In Series 2 this is played as a race, but other series play it as a simple challenge.

Stone Bridge (Series 7): A cross between Snake Pit and Stepping Stones, warriors race head-to-head using a plank to cross between stones to a platform holding a ring.

Stone of Destiny (Series 11–12): Warriors must place five prism staffs into corresponding holes in stones within a time limit.

Stone Soldiers (Series 7–8, 10–12): Warriors race to assemble stone statues of warriors in order to defeat demons guarding the way forward. This is similar in many ways to the Blasted Mountain challenge.

Sunken Treasure, also known as Ravine (Series 8–10): Pairs of warriors work together with one warrior finding the keys to a series of chests that only the other warrior can see.

Swinging Ball (Series 2): Warriors go head-to-head to try and knock each other off their platforms using a boulder on a rope. Similar to Long Staff.

Symbol Search (Series 11–12): Pairs of warriors try to solve a riddle on a board covered with symbols; one reads the riddle and the other attempts to solve it.

Target Mines (Series 8–11): Warriors swim out onto a lake to collect treasure rings, but not before using a catapult to detonate three mines floating in their path.

Target Run (Series 7): Warriors attempt to destroy moving cannonballs by shooting at them with a crossbow.

The Chasm (Series 7): Warriors cross a narrow beam over a great chasm while avoiding swinging rocks.

The Circle (Series 1): Pairs of warriors stand in a circular arena with a shield and three bags of chalk to throw at each other. Missiles can be blocked with the shield, the player who lands the most hits on their opponent wins.

The Drop (Series 8): The Drop is a race down a sheer cliff face, followed by a zip-line.

The Eyeless Demons (Series 1–2, 4): Warriors must sneak past two blind demons anchored to the ground while retrieving treasure rings with poles. The rings are attached to skulls with chimes hanging down. Ringing the chimes causes the demons to swing their axes in the warrior's direction; touching the axe is an instant fail.

The Gorge (Series 7): Two warriors co-operate to match a symbol in a gorge to one painted on a skull on the bank, which must be filled with water before the approaching demon reaches them.

The Last Stand (Series 2–12): This challenge serves as the final challenge of each week for every series except Series 1. Originally a challenge to assemble parts of a key to unlock a portal, it was later developed into a gauntlet of physical challenges with the portal at the end. In all cases Nevar is nearby firing bolts of lightning at the warriors that must be dodged. The layout of the course varies between series.

The Old Troll (Series 1): Played on the first day of each week, warriors must answer a riddle posed by a troll.

Thrall Demons (Series 1–6): Warriors must navigate a maze while blindfolded, taking care not to touch any of the various lengths of string that make up the maze walls. Touching a string will ring a bell and awaken the demons in the maze. In Series 1, Raven will turn his back on the challenger and recite a series of instructions to guide them through safely. In subsequent series a second warrior is chosen to guide them through.

Way Of The Warrior (Series 1–10):

Warrior's Eye (Series 9–10): A simple archery challenge similar to Serpent's Eye. Warriors shoot three arrows each into a target using a longbow. The warriors must hit the target at least once to pass, and hitting the golden warrior's eye in the middle will award treasure rings. But hitting the silver warrior's skulls around the edge of the target is an automatic failure, even if they previously managed to hit the target elsewhere.

== Production and awards ==
The series was first produced by BBC Scotland in 2002. For the first seven series it was shot in the grounds of Castle Toward 8 miles (13 km) south-west of Dunoon, near Toward Point and the village of Toward. The production includes many CGI effects throughout, including the appearance and disappearance of objects and characters (including contestants), rapidly encroaching lava flows, burning targets and fizzing gases, and the zoomorphism of Raven in the title sequence. The show has won two BAFTAs for Best Children's Programme, in 2003 and 2006 for Series 1 and 4.

The first series in 2002 was executive produced by Nigel Pope who was involved in devising the original format for the show. The producer was Colin Ward Nobbs who wrote all the scripts, co-devised the games and revised the format, and was then asked to stay on as the Executive Producer for Series 2 and 3. Matthew Napier produced 6 series in total, from Series 2 to 7. Series 8 to 10 were produced by Dougie Napier, who directed the previous two series. Series 11 was produced by Nick Gunaydin upon his interview. The set and games designers are Tom Barker and Liz Barron, who created the look and helped format the show as well as devising most of the challenges. The directors have changed between series:

Series	Name
1	Bob Harvey, Brian Ross
2, 5	Bill McLeod
3, 4	Paul Hineman
6, 7	Dougie Napier
8	John Payne (Weeks 1 – 3); Dougie Napier (Final Week)
9, 10	Dougie Napier
11, 12	Moe Abutoq

Series 8, which introduced a number of changes to the programme, was produced under a slightly different production crew, including the director and editors; filming moved to Aviemore being based at Lagganlia Centre for Outdoor Education at Kincraig, rather than the previous location of Castle Toward. Filming for Series 11 returned to Lagganlia Centre and features new composers as part of the production crew.

== See also ==
- Raven: The Island
- Raven: The Secret Temple
- Raven: The Dragon's Eye
