= James Mackenzie (actor) =

Scottish actor (born 1979)

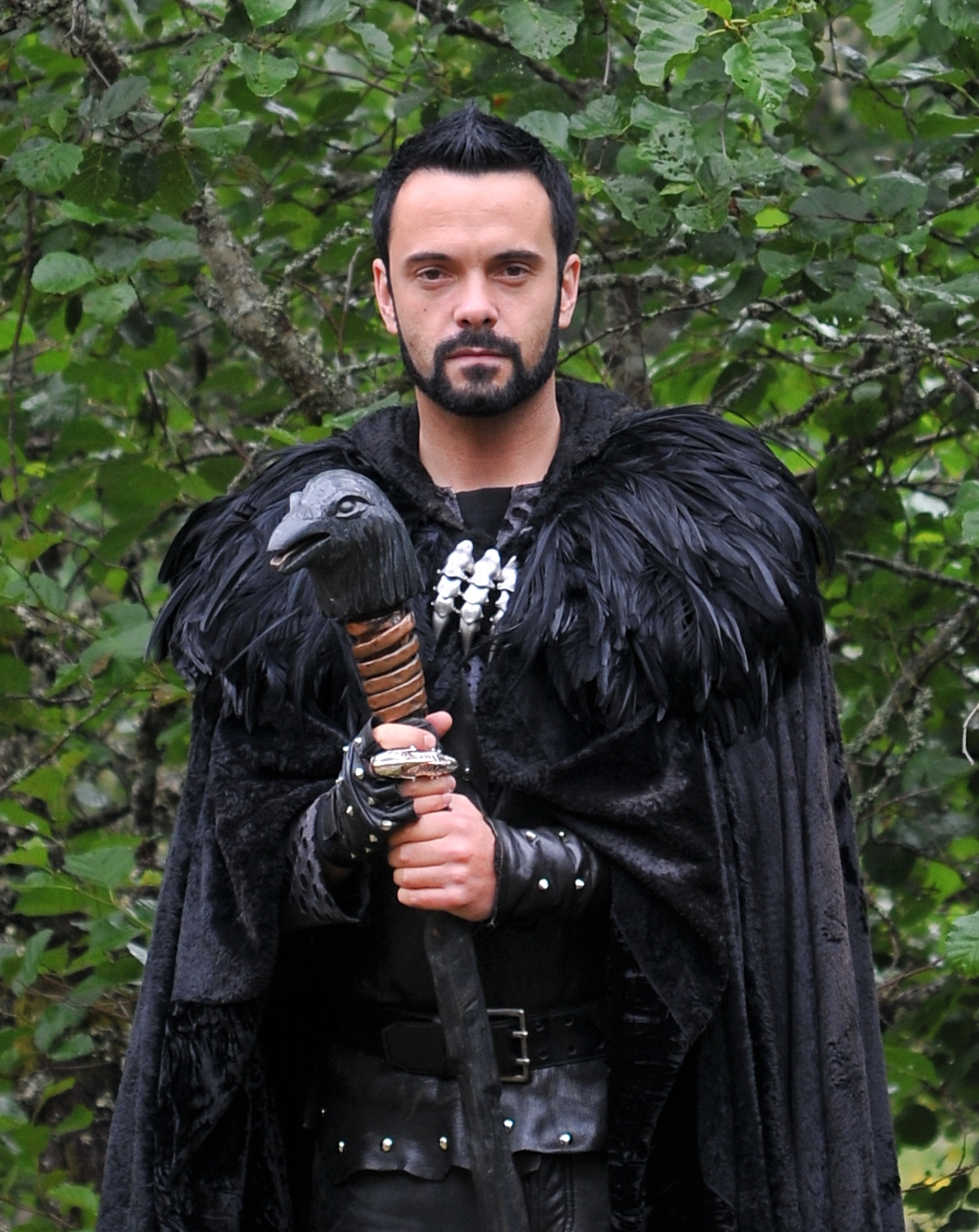
- Mackenzie as Raven in 2009
- Born: 15 May 1979 (age 47); Dundee, Scotland
- Education: Queen Margaret University College
- Occupations: Actor, game show host
- Years active: 1995–present
- Height: 5 ft 10 in (1.78 m)
- Spouse: Helen McAlpine
- Website: http://www.jamesmackenzie.co.uk

James Mackenzie (born 15 May 1979) is a Scottish actor and game show host. He is best known for playing the original lead role in the children's game show Raven. His titular character's catchphrase on the show was "Let the challenge... Begin." He has also played Gary Trenton in the BBC Scotland soap opera River City, and a widower father in the CBeebies show Molly and Mack.

== Personal life ==
Mackenzie was born on 15 May 1979 in Dundee and has lived in Scotland all his life. He was educated at Queen Margaret University College, where he studied and trained in acting at the University’s School of Drama. He is the son of actor Michael Mackenzie, who in the 1970s played the title role of Tarot in Ace of Wands, a cult children's TV series of the time; Mackenzie Sr. also made several appearances in Raven: The Island as Cyrus, as well as in River City, with Mackenzie playing the character Alasdair Quinn.

== Career ==
His television career has mainly focused on the Raven series, but he has also appeared in several other television programmes, such as Rebus, Taggart, CBBC series Dani's House and Scottish soap opera River City. His stage career over the years has spanned everything from Macbeth to pantomime. His voice can also be heard on many commercial voiceovers. In 2013 Mackenzie starred in the stage adaptation of Roger Hunt’s autobiographical book Be Silent or Be Killed, which details the author's personal experiences trapped in the Oberoi Hotel in Mumbai during the 2008 Mumbai terrorist attacks Mackenzie toured the UK with Dundee Rep's production of Sunshine on Leith, a musical based on the songs of the Proclaimers, starring alongside The Lord of the Rings' Billy Boyd.

As well as his acting work, he has also presented for CBBC on a couple of occasions, and appeared as a special guest presenter on the CBBC art show, SMart. He currently has a part on Molly and Mack as a widower father, and played a convict called Caleb in season 4 of Outlander.

== Filmography ==
Television
Year	Title	Role
1997–1999	Taggart	Keith Burns
2001	Rebus	Pete
2002–2010	Raven	Raven
2017–2018	Raven	Raven of Old
2006	Still Game	Leader of the Neds
2006	Raven: The Island	Raven
2007	Raven: The Secret Temple	Raven
2009	Raven: The Dragon's Eye	Raven
2011–2012	Dani's House	Zorlock
2015–2017	River City	Gary Trenton
2018–2022	Molly and Mack	James
2018–2019	Outlander	Caleb
2019	Swashbuckle	Al-Hoy
2024	A Scottish Love Scheme	Rory
