= One Night of Queen =

Touring tribute stage show

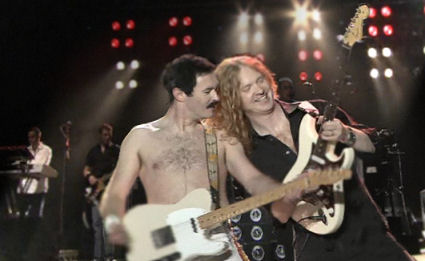
- One Night of Queen

Background information
- Genres: Tribute act
- Instruments: Vocals, guitar, synthesizer, Keyboards, drums
- Years active: 2001-present
- Members: Gary Mullen Malcolm Gentles; David Brockett; Jon Halliwell; Alan McGeoch
- Past members: Jonathon Evans; Martin Campbell; Billy Moffat; Gordon McNeil
- Website: www.garymullenandtheworks.com

One Night of Queen is a touring 2-hour stage show, paying tribute to the stage theatrics and music of Queen. It is performed by Gary Mullen & The Works, a band headed by Freddie Mercury imitator Gary Mullen, who had previously won the talent show Stars in Their Eyes with his vocal and visual imitation of Mercury. The other members of the band are David Brockett on guitar, Jon Halliwell on drums, Alan McGeoch on bass and Malcolm Gentles on keyboards.

== Gary Mullen & The Works ==
After winning Stars in Their Eyes in 2000 by receiving a record breaking number of votes for the show, Mullen began touring with his band The Works, putting on a sell-out tribute show known as One Night of Queen.

The show takes references from many 1980s Queen tours, using a modified custom built lighting rig, made to emulate the lighting rigs used during several Queen tours between 1980 and 1986. In a 2018 interview, Mullen was quoted as saying, "We are trying to create something that you'll never see again because you'll never see Queen with Freddie (Mercury) or John (Deacon)." Gary Mullen & The Works have taken their One Night of Queen show on numerous world tours across the U.K., Europe, New Zealand, South Africa and the U.S. In the United States, Gary Mullen & The Works have been doing extensive tours every year since 2008.

== Reception ==
Since it began in 2001, the One Night of Queen show has gained celebrity admirers including actor Kevin Pollak, Governor of Texas Rick Perry, and singer Rick Astley. During their 2018 U.S. tour, Rob Halford, lead singer of Judas Priest, was in attendance at The Celebrity Theatre in Phoenix, AZ to watch their show.
