= List of programmes broadcast by CBeebies =

CBeebies is a British children's free-to-air television channel owned by the BBC. This article lists television programmes that currently and formerly air on the network.

== Current programming ==
=== Original programmes ===
==== In-house ====
The shows listed here are produced by BBC Studios Kids & Family or its predecessors.

- Andy's Adventures
  - Andy's Aquatic Adventures (2020)
  - Andy's Dinosaur Adventures (2014)
  - Andy's Global Adventures (2023)
  - Andy's Prehistoric Adventures (2016)
  - Andy's Safari Adventures (2018)
  - Andy's Wild Adventures (2012)
- Biff and Chip (2021) (Note: Distributed by BBC Studios in the UK but not overseas.)
- Catie's Amazing Machines (2018)
- Down on the Farm (2015)
- GiggleQuiz (2019)
- Go Jetters (2015)
- Go Wild (2023)
- Grace's Amazing Machines (2020)
- JoJo & Gran Gran (2020)
- Justin's House (2011)
- Love Monster (2020) (Note: Co-Production. Not distributed by BBC Studios.)
- Old Jack's Boat (2013)
- Our Family (2016)
- Poppies (2014)
- Rafi the Wishing Wizard (2026)
- Roots and Fruits (2022)
- Show Me Show Me (2009)
- Something Special (2003)
- Stan Can (2025)
- Supertato (2022) (Note: Co-Production.)
- Swashbuckle (2013)
- Teeny Tiny Creatures (2021)
- Tiny Tunes (2026)
- Tiny Wonders (2020)

===== BBC iPlayer only =====
- Andy's Dino Toybox (2020)
- Biggleton (2017)
- Colours (2021)
- Daydreams (2020)
- Gigglebiz (2009)
- Jennie's Fitness in 5 (2021)
- Kit & Pup (2018)
- Molly and Mack (2018)
- Number 1 Newton Avenue (2021)
- Oti's Boogie Beebies (2020)
- YolanDa's Band Jam (2019)

==== Commissioned ====
Shows listed here are commissioned by CBeebies but are produced by third-parties.

- Alphablocks (2010)
- Apple Tree House (2017)
- Baby Jake (2011)
- Balamory (revival) (2026)
- Beddybyes (2025)
- Big Cook, Little Cook (revival series) (2022)
- Big Lizard (2024)
- Bing (2014)
- Bitz and Bob (2018)
- Charlie and Lola (2005) (Note: Distributed by BBC Worldwide/Studios until 2023.)
- Chuggington (2008)
- Clangers (2015)
- Colourblocks (2022)
- Dipdap (2011)
- Dog Loves Books (2020) (Note: Distributed by BBC Studios.)
- Dog Squad (2022)
- Dodge's Pup School (2024)
- Football Fantastics (2025)
- Fred & Pete's Treasure Tales (2023)
  - Art Adventures with Fred & Pete (2024)
- The Furchester Hotel (2014)
- The Game Catchers (2023)
- Get Set Galactic (2023)
- Get Well Soon (2012)
- Hey Duggee (2015)
- I Can Do It, You Can Too (2023)
- In the Night Garden (2007)
- Katie Morag (2013) (Note: Distributed by BBC Worldwide/Studios.)
- Kiri and Lou (2020)
- Let's Go for a Walk! (2020)
- Maddie's Do You Know? (2016)
  - Maddie, Space and You (2021)
  - Maddie, The Home and You (2021)
  - Maddie, The Plants and You (2021)
  - Maddie, The Zoo and You (2020)
- Maddie & Triggs (2024)
- Magic Hands (2013)
- Messy Goes to Okido (2015)
- Mojo Swoptops (2024)
- Monster Makes (2026)
- Moon and Me (2019)
- My World Kitchen (2018)
- Numberblocks (2017)
- Nick Cope's Popcast (2020)
- Nikhil & Jay (2024)
- Octonauts (2010)
- Patchwork Pals (2016)
- Peter Rabbit (2012)
- Piggy Builders (2025)
- Piripenguins (2025)
- Ranger Hamza's Eco Quest (2022)
- Sarah & Duck (2013)
- School of Roars (2017)
- Small Potatoes (2011)
- Tee and Mo (2018) (shown in short episodes beginning in 2013) (long-form series began in 2018)
- Teletubbies (revival series) (2015)
- Time for School (2014)
- The Toddler Club (2021)
- Topsy and Tim (2013)
- Twirlywoos (2015)
- Vida the Vet (2024)
- Waffle the Wonder Dog (2018)
- What's in Your Bag? (2023)
- What's on Your Head? (2021)
- Wonderblocks (2025)
- Yakka Dee! (2017)
- Yukee (2024)

===== BBC iPlayer only =====
- Andy and the Band (2020)
- The Baby Club (2019)
- B.O.T. and the Beasties (2021)
- Hushabye Lullabye (2020)
- My Petsaurus (2017)
- Olga da Polga (2022)
- Monty and Co. (2020)
- Pablo (2017)
- Raa Raa the Noisy Lion (2011)
- Teddles (2019)
- Timmy Time (2009)
- Tinpo (2018)
- Treasure Champs (2018)
- Tree Fu Tom (2012)
- Woolly and Tig (2012)

=== Acquired programmes ===
This section includes third-party acquisitions.

- Activate with Joe Wicks (2025)
- Bluey (2021)
- Dylan's Playtime Adventures (2024)
- Gecko's Garage (2023)
- Lu & the Bally Bunch (2024)
- Pfffirates (2022)
- Pinocchio and Friends (2022)
- Postman Pat: SDS (2008)
- Puffin Rock (2025)
- Spidey and His Amazing Friends (2022)
- The Weasy Family (2025)
- Vegesaurs (2023)

==== BBC iPlayer only ====
- Blippi Wonders (2022)
- Cocomelon (2021)
- Daniel Tiger's Neighbourhood (2022)
- Digley and Dazey (2021)
- Go Buster (2021)
- Lellobee City Farm (2023)
- Let's Dance (2022)
- Little Baby Bum (2021)
- Olobob Top (2017)
- Playtime with Twinkle (2021)
- Tik Tak (2020)
- Tish Tash (2021)

=== Programming blocks ===
- This is CBeebies (5:30 am-6:00 am) (2009–present)
- Get Set Go (6:00 am-9:00 am) (Note: Originally aired from 7:00 am-9:00 am.) (2006–present)
- Discover and Do (9:00 am-3:15 pm) (Note: Originally aired from 9:00 am-3:00 pm.) (2007–present)
- Lunchtime (12:00 pm-1:00 pm) (Note: Originally aired from 12:00pm-12:30pm.) (2009–present)
- Big Fun Time (3:15 pm-5.45 pm) (Note: Originally aired from 3:00 pm-6:00pm and later from 3:00 pm-5:45 pm.) (2007–present)
- Bedtime Hour (5:45 pm-7:00 pm) (Note: Originally aired from 6:00 pm-7:00 pm.) (2003–present)

== Former programmes ==
=== Original ===
==== In-house ====
- The Adventures of Abney & Teal (2011–2019)
- Andy's Baby Animals (2016–2023)
- Andy Pandy (2002–2008)
- Andy's Secret Hideout (2017)
- Balamory (2002–2016)
- Becky and Barnaby Bear (2002–2009)
- Be Safe with the Tweenies (2002–2009)
- Bill and Ben (2002–2008)
- Bits and Bobs (2002–2012)
- Bobinogs (2004–2010)
- Boogie Beebies (2004–2014)
- Buzz and Tell (2010–2018)
- Carrie and David's Popshop (2008–2015)
- Dinopaws (2014–2018)
- Doodle Do (2006–2010)
- Fab Lab (2002–2006)
- Feeling Better (2018)
- Ferne and Rory's Vet Tales (2018–2022)
- Fimbles (2002–2012)
- Garden Tales (2021–2022)
- Garth and Bev (2010–2012)
- Green Balloon Club (2008–2014)
- Happy Tent Tales (2019)
- Higgledy House (2005–2009)
- Jackanory Junior (2007–2012)
- Junk Rescue (2018–2020)
- Kerwhizz (2008–2017)
- LazyTown Extra (2008–2012)
- Let's Celebrate (2010–2018)
- The Let's Go Club (2015–2018)
- The Lingo Show (2012–2017)
- Little Human Planet (2011–2017)
- Little Prairie Dogs (2010–2015)
- Magic Door (2016–2019)
- Melody (2013–2021)
- Mighty-Mites (2010–2011)
- Mr Bloom: Here and There (2014–2018)
- Mr Bloom's Nursery (2011–2017)
- My First (2016–2025)
- My Pet and Me (2014–2021)
- My Story (2012–2019)
- Nelly and Nora (2015–2019)
- Nina and the Neurons (2007–2017)
- The Numtums (2012–2018)
- Nuzzle and Scratch (2008–2015)
- Oh Yes It Is (2003–2004)
- Our Planet (2006–2012)
- Poetry Pie (2009–2012)
- Razzledazzle (2005–2009)
- The Rhyme Rocket (2012–2015)
- The Roly Mo Show (2004–2009)
- Same Smile (2010–2016)
- The Shiny Show (2002–2009)
- SMarteenies (2002–2008)
- The Song Catcher (2005–2007)
- Space Pirates (2007–2011)
- Spot Bots (2016–2018)
- CBeebies Stargazing (2014–2021)
- Step Inside (2002–2010)
- The Story Makers (2002–2009)
- Take a Bow (2007–2010)
- Tellytales (2009–2013)
- Tikkabilla (2002–2014)
- Tiny Tumble (2013–2018)
- Tommy Zoom (2007–2014)
- Where in the World? (2017–2021)
- Zingalong (2002–2004)
- ZingZillas (2010–2017)

==== Commissioned ====
- 3rd & Bird (2008–2015)
- Abadas (2011–2016)
- Big and Small (2008–2015)
- Big Barn Farm (2008–2018)
- Big City Park (2010–2014)
- Big Cook, Little Cook (original series) (2004–2012)
- Binka (2002–2005)
- Bob the Builder (2002–2014)
- Boj (2014–2018)
- Boo! (2003–2010)
- Cloudbabies (2012–2015)
- dirtgirlworld (2009–2014) (Note: Distributed by BBC Worldwide in the UK at the time.)
- Driver Dan's Story Train (2010–2016)
- Everything's Rosie (2010–2018)
- Finley the Fire Engine (2007–2012)
- Footy Pups (2015–2021)
- Get Squiggling (2008–2017)
- Gordon the Garden Gnome (2005–2008)
- Grandpa in My Pocket (2009–2017)
- Guess with Jess (2009–2012)
- Gudrun: The Viking Princess (2018–2019)
- I Can Cook (2009–2018)
- Iconicles (2011–2015)
- Jamillah and Aladdin (2015–2018)
- Kate & Mim-Mim (2014–2018)
- Kazoops! (2016–2018)
- The Large Family (2007–2014) (Note: Distributed by BBC Worldwide.)
- Let's Play (2012–2021)
- Little Charley Bear (2011–2015)
- Little Red Tractor (2004–2011)
- Little Roy (2016–2019)
- Me Too! (2006–2016) (Note: Distributed by BBC Worldwide at the time.)
- Mama Mirabelle's Home Movies (2007–2012)
- Mike the Knight (2011–2017)
- Mister Maker (2007–2016)
- Mister Maker Comes to Town (2010-2018)
- Mister Maker Around the World (2013-2018)
- Mister Maker's Arty Party (2015-2022)
- Mister Maker at Home (2020-2022)
- Muffin the Mule (2005–2008)
- Numberjacks (2006–2015)
- Pinky Dinky Doo (2006–2012)
- Q Pootle 5 (2013–2017)
- Rastamouse (2011–2018)
- Ruff-Ruff, Tweet and Dave (2015–2017)
- Sergeant Stripes (2003–2004)
- Teacup Travels (2015–2019)
- Teletubbies: Everywhere (2002–2006)
- Tilly and Friends (2012–2016)
- Tinga Tinga Tales (2010–2021)
- Waybuloo (2009–2018)
- Wibbly Pig (2009–2014)
- Wide-Eye (2003–2006)
- Wussywat the Clumsy Cat (2015–2018)

=== Acquired ===
- 64 Zoo Lane (2002–2019)
- Arthur (2021-2022)
- Brum (2002–2012)
- Clifford the Big Red Dog (2002–2011)
- Clifford's Puppy Days (2003–2011)
- Ethelbert the Tiger (2002–2010)
- Fireman Sam (2002–2007)
- Harry & Toto (2008–2012)
- Jakers! The Adventures of Piggley Winks (2006–2011)
- Jollywobbles! (2010)
- The Koala Brothers (2003–2015)
- LazyTown (2005–2012)
- Little Bear (2002–2005, BBC One/Two block only)
- Louie (2008–2013)
- Little Robots (2003–2015)
- Lulu Zipadoo (2011–2012)
- Lunar Jim (2006–2012)
- Open a Door (2003–2007)
- Penelope (2009–2011)
- Penelope K, by the way (2010) (Note: International Co-Production.)
- Pingu (2002–2015)
  - The Pingu Show (2007–2012)
- Polka Dot Shorts (2004)
- Postman Pat (2002–2017)
- Rubbadubbers (2002–2008)
- Sesame Tree (2008–2013)
- ToddWorld (2006–2011)
- Tots TV (2004–2008)
- Underground Ernie (2006–2009)
- Uki (2011–2013)
- What's the Big Idea? (2013–2021)
- Zigby (2009–2012)

=== Reruns ===
- The Adventures of Spot (2002–2004)
- Angelmouse (2002–2005)
- Bodger & Badger (2002–2005)
- Bitsa (2002–2004)
- Come Outside (2002–2012)
- Dr Otter (2002–2004)
- El Nombre (2003–2004)
- The Family-Ness (2002)
- Little Big Cat (2008–2015)
- The Magic Key (2003–2005)
- Melvin and Maureen's Music-a-Grams (2007)
- Model Millie (2007)
- Monster Café (2007)
- Noddy's Toyland Adventures (2002–2005)
- Oakie Doke (2002)
- Pablo the Little Red Fox (2002–2010)
- Penny Crayon (2002)
- The Poddington Peas (2002)
- Playdays (2002–2004)
- Spider! (2002–2004)
- Spot's Musical Adventures (2003)
- Storytime (2002)
- Teletubbies (original series) (2002–2015)
- Tweenies (2002–2016)
- Wiggly Park (2002–2004)
- William's Wish Wellingtons (2002−2004)
- Yoho Ahoy (2002–2005)
- Yoko! Jakamoko! Toto! (2009–2013)

=== Programming blocks ===
- The Carrot Club (2003–2004)
- Pick and Play (2004)
- Pui's Exploring Hour (2004)
- Sid's Fix-It Hour (2004)
- Chris' Sing-Along Hour (2004)
- Sue's Make and Do Hour (2004)
- Nicole's Furry Friends Hour (2004)
- Bear and Butterfly (2005)
- Explorers (2006–2007)
- Little Lunchers (2006–2007)
- Story Corner (2006–2007)
- Busy Beebies (2006–2007)
- Alphabet Time (2006–2007)
