= BBC Kids (Canadian TV channel) =

Canadian children's British-centric channel

- Final logo used from 2016 to 2018
- Country: Canada
- Broadcast area: Nationwide
- Headquarters: Burnaby, British Columbia, Canada

Programming
- Language: English
- Picture format: 480i (SDTV); 1080i (HDTV)

Ownership
- Owner: Alliance Atlantis (2001–2008); Canwest (2008–2010); Shaw Media (2010–2011); Knowledge West Communications (80%) (2011–2018); BBC Studios (20%)
- Sister channels: Knowledge Network

History
- Launched: November 5, 2001; 24 years ago
- Closed: December 31, 2018; 7 years ago
- Replaced by: Knowledge Network (Knowledge Kids block, programming)

BBC Kids was a Canadian specialty television channel carrying programming for children and teenagers. It was a joint venture between Knowledge West Communications, which managed the network and held the majority 80% interest and was a subsidiary of Knowledge Network, with BBC Studios licensing the BBC brand and holding the remaining 20% in the joint venture. Originally an ad-supported network, it transitioned to non-commercial operation when it was transferred to Knowledge.

== History ==
=== Launch ===
Original logo, used from 2001 to 2011; A stretched version of the logo was used from 2011 to 2016

In November 2000, Alliance Atlantis was granted approval by the Canadian Radio-television and Telecommunications Commission (CRTC) to launch BBC Kids, described as "a national English language Category 2 (what is the current category B) specialty television service devoted to top-quality educational and entertaining programming for children and youth (ages 2-17). It will feature programming primarily from the UK and around the world. 65% of the programming will target children ages 2 to 7, and 35% will target youth ages 8 to 17."

The channel launched on November 5, 2001, as a joint venture between Alliance Atlantis and BBC Worldwide, the BBC's overseas operating arm. As was its remit, it primarily sourced its programming from networks and producers from the United Kingdom, though its programming sources were never exclusively limited to those of the BBC. This also included international co-productions, including Tots TV, Mr. Bean: The Animated Series, and The Sleepover Club from Australia. It also broadcast a small amount of Canadian and Anglo-Canadian co-productions (including formerly-produced Alliance programming co-produced with a U.S. network such as PBS, Disney Channel, or Nickelodeon for U.S. broadcast) to meet CRTC Canadian content regulations and quotas.

=== Transition from Alliance Atlantis to Knowledge Network ===
On January 18, 2008, a joint venture between Canwest and Goldman Sachs Alternatives known as CW Media, acquired control of BBC Kids through its purchase of Alliance Atlantis' broadcasting assets, which were placed in a trust in August 2007. It then became a part of Shaw Communications on October 10, 2010, after it acquired Canwest outright with the GSCP stake in CW Media.

Shaw's ownership would be short-lived due to regulatory requirements to sell some former CW Media assets, and that process started on December 22, 2010, with early due diligence with a then-undisclosed sales partner. On January 17, 2011, Knowledge Network Corporation, a Crown corporation of the Government of British Columbia, announced it had finalized an agreement to purchase the channel through a subsidiary called Knowledge-West Communications Corporation from Shaw Media. BBC Worldwide would retain its existing interest. The sale was completed on April 29, 2011, and with it and CRTC approval, it converted from a commercial network to a non-commercial service, while relocating operations from Toronto to Burnaby in suburban Vancouver.

The transaction resulted in a decision by cable providers in The Bahamas and Jamaica (which generally import Canadian channels onto their services for the convenience of snowbirds visiting the West Indies) to remove the network from its line-up at the end of 2011.

=== Closure ===
On October 2, 2018, a joint statement from Knowledge Network and the BBC announced the channel would close at 23:59pm on December 31, 2018. Although no explanation was originally given for the closure, then-Knowledge chief Rudy Buttignol subsequently cited the end of the CRTC's traditional protection of small and independent networks to allow for broader discretionary services without any programming restrictions. Knowledge continues to carry programming from the BBC, and CBBC/CBeebies programming as a part of Knowledge Kids, including programming from BBC Kids merged onto the Knowledge schedule. On January 10, 2019, the CRTC terminated BBC Kids' channel licence at the request of Knowledge.

== Programming ==
Most programming on the channel is taken from the BBC archives, alongside programmes from other UK broadcasters. Despite the channel's name, BBC Kids also aired programmes aimed towards teenagers and young adults. To fulfill Canadian content guidelines, BBC Kids also aired programming that was produced in the country, which, after the Knowledge Network purchase, was mainly programming that already aired on their Knowledge Kids strand.

=== Original Programming ===
- Dinosapien (2007–2010)
- Kate & Mim-Mim
- KidsWorld Sports
- Lah-Lah's Adventures
- Lunar Jim (2006–2013)
- Noonbory and the Super Seven (2009-2010's)

=== From the BBC ===
- 4 O'Clock Club
- Absolutely Fabulous
- Andy Pandy (2002–2007)
- Andy's Wild Adventures
- Balamory (2004–2011)
- Barney
- The Basil Brush Show
- Bear Behaving Badly (2008–2011)
- Belfry Witches
- Bill and Ben
- Bits and Bobs
- Blackadder (2004-20??)
- Bob the Builder
- Boogie Beebies (2007–2010)
- Buzz and Tell
- Changing Rooms
- Charlie and Lola
- Deadly 60
- Doctor Who
- Escape from Scorpion Island
- Fimbles
- Garth and Bev
- Home Farm Twins
- Horrible Histories
- Jeopardy (2002–2004)
- Kerching!
- Kerwhizz
- Leonardo
- Little Britain
- Little Robots
- Miami 7 (2004–2011)
- Mr Bloom's Nursery
- The Naked Chef
- No Sweat
- Nuzzle and Scratch
- Pingu
- Postman Pat (2004–2009)
- Rastamouse
- Raven (2004–2014)
- The Really Wild Show
- The Roly Mo Show (2008–2011)
- Shaun the Sheep
- The Secret Show
- Serious
- Stitch Up!
- Teletubbies (2001–2009)
- Top of the Pops
- Trapped!
- Tree Fu Tom
- Tweenies
- Two Pints of Lager and a Packet of Crisps
- What Not to Wear
- Who Let the Dogs Out?
- Yoho Ahoy
- The Young Ones

=== From other UK broadcasters ===
- Florrie's Dragons
- The Giblet Boys
- Girls in Love
- Hollyoaks
- Humf
- Jamie's School Dinners (2008–2009)
- My Hero
- My Parents Are Aliens
- Olive the Ostrich
- The Strangerers
- Thomas & Friends (2001–2009)
- Thunderbirds

=== Canadian Programming ===
- 2gether: The Series
- Ace Lightning (2003–2010)
- Are You Afraid of the Dark? (2006–2010)
- Arthur (2006–2011)
- Atomic Betty
- Being Ian
- Big Wolf on Campus
- Black Hole High
- Caitlin's Way
- The Famous Jett Jackson
- Fraggle Rock
- In a Heartbeat
- I Was a Sixth Grade Alien! (2007–2009)
- Jacob Two-Two
- Joe and Jack
- The Magic School Bus (2001–2002)
- Mighty Machines
- Mona the Vampire
- Naturally, Sadie
- Our Hero
- Popular Mechanics for Kids
- Rainbow Fish
- Ready or Not
- Shoebox Zoo (2006–2011)
- Surprise! It's Edible Incredible!
- Theodore Tugboat (2005–2009)
- What About Mimi?
- Yam Roll
- Zooboomafoo

=== Other Programming ===
- 3 Non Blondes
- 90 Days in Hollywood
- Bananas in Pyjamas (2001–2009)
- The Call
- Celeb
- Connie the Cow
- Dinosaur Detectives (2001–2007)
- DIY TV
- Don't Blame the Koalas (2004-20??)
- Gawayn
- The Genie from Down Under
- Home on Their Own
- K9
- Klumpies
- Lightning Point
- Lockie Leonard
- Mal.com
- Mortified
- Pat & Stan
- Powers (2004-20??)
- Robin Hood: Mischief in Sherwood
- Rooms that Rock
- The Saddle Club
- The Sleepover Club
- Stuff (2001–2006)
- The Wonder Years (2008–2009)

== Programming blocks ==
- CBeebies – the network's morning preschool block, based on the BBC channel of the same name, which premiered after the Knowledge transfer.
- Cartoon Afternoons – the network's afternoon block of animated series.
- Drama at 8 – a primetime block of family sitcoms and dramas.

The logo used for identification of the "BBCK" 'mini-network'.

- BBCK – an overnight block targeted at older teenagers that aired from April 3, 2006, until the Knowledge transfer. It was purposefully scheduled to appear as its own network, similar to The N on Noggin in the U.S., with its own website and continuity separate from BBC Kids.
- The Spot – the network's block of pre-teen programming, which ran during afternoons (usually until the start of BBCK) and weekday mornings. It aired from launch until the Knowledge transfer.
