= Pete Hillier =

British dancer (born 1977)

- Born: Peter Michael Hillier; 14 November 1977 (age 48); Cambridge, Cambridgeshire, England
- Occupations: Dancer, presenter, director, choreographer

Peter Michael Hillier (born 14 November 1977) is an English dancer born in Cambridge.

He trained at the McKenzie School of Speech and Drama and the Bodywork Dance Studios, both in Cambridge.

== Television career ==
Hillier is best known for his role as a male presenter on the BAFTA award-winning BBC children's music programme Boogie Beebies, alongside Nataylia Roni.

As well as presenting, he dances, teaches dance, sings, does stand-up comedy, and is a choreographer and director. He has choreographed fashion and exhibition shows.

Hillier now works at Stagecoach Northampton alongside actress Alison Pargeter.

== Selected credits ==
=== Television ===
- 2004–2006: Boogie Beebies BBC – self

=== Theatre ===
- 2010 to 2011 Dec–Jan: Snow White pantomime at The Grand Theatre, Swansea, playing Muddles.
- 2009:to 2010 Boogie Pete Live (UK tour)
- 2008: Jack and the Beanstalk pantomime at Darlington Civic Theatre playing Jack Trot.
- 2007–2008: Aladdin Pantomime at Pavilion Theatre, Rhyl – Director, Wishee Washee
- 2007: Boogie Nights theatre tour with Qdos Productions – Terry
- 2004–2005: Saturday Night Fever at Apollo Victoria Theatre, London – Gus
- 2001–2002: Kiss Me, Kate at Victoria Palace Theatre, London
