= Lunar Jim =

Canadian animated series

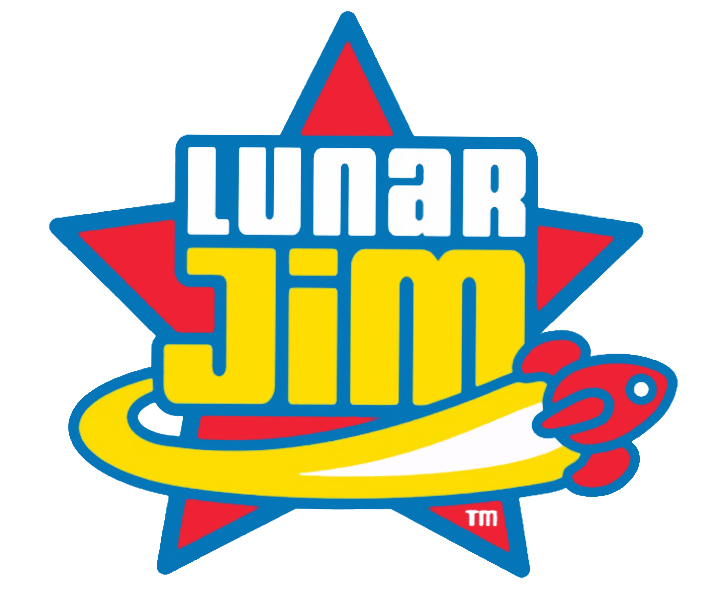
- Genre: Adventure; Children's; Science fiction
- Created by: Alexander Bar
- Directed by: Brian Duchscherer; Alex Busby; Peter Huggan; Benny Zelkowicz; Jay Silver
- Voices of: Benny Zelkowicz; Gil Anderson; Jim Fowler; John Davie; Kristin Bell
- Composer: Volcano Music
- Country of origin: Canada
- Original language: English
- No. of seasons: 2
- No. of episodes: 46 (92 segments)

Production
- Executive producers: Charles Bishop; Ken Faier; Alex Greeg; Jeff Rosen
- Producers: Charles Bishop; Katrina Walsh
- Running time: 22 minutes (11 minutes per segment)
- Production companies: Halifax Film Company; Alliance Atlantis (Note: As LJ Productions 2003 Ltd. and Lunar Jim Productions Inc. for Series 1, and Let's Get Lunar Productions Ltd. for Series 2.)

Original release
- Network: CBC Television (Kids'CBC); BBC Kids; Ici Radio-Canada Télé
- Release: January 2, 2006 – October 19, 2007

Lunar Jim is a Canadian science fiction stop-motion animated television series that aired from 2 January 2006 to 19 October 2007. The show focuses on Lunar Jim, an astronaut on the Blue Moon L22.

The show, produced by Halifax Film Company and Alliance Atlantis in association with CBC Television, Radio-Canada and BBC Kids, was based on an original concept created by Alexander Bar. One of the directors of the series, Benny Zelkowicz, voiced Jim.

== Origins ==
In the spring of 1994, Alexander Bar drew a picture of a spaceman on the moon watching his moon buggy being driven off by a couple of little green men who were blowing raspberries at him, with the caption "Oh no… Joyriders!". After thinking about what the character of the spaceman and his robot could be doing on the moon, by looking at the drawing of the man, Bar knew his name would be Lunar Jim.

From there, he produce marketing materials Lunar Jim as a comic strip. His first call was to the comic strip editor of the Daily Mail. Bar had to pitch over the phone unprepared, and said "It's about a man who walks about on the moon all day doing nothing in particular." The editor then responded with "I like it! Send it in!".

While the Daily Mail deal never came through, Lunar Jim got his first public outing in the Young Telegraph on 21 October 1996.

== Premise ==
Jim and his team – Rover the Robot Dog, Ripple the Super Space Mechanic, Eco the Farmer and T.E.D. the Technical Equipment Device – live on Blue Moon L22, the second-to-last moon on the edge of the Milky Way. Focusing on exploration and inquiry, Lunar Jim intends to promote such life-lesson skills as problem-solving, persistence, creativity, and cooperation, with an emphasis on "pre-science skills". His catchphrase is "Let's get lunar!"

Season 1 features only the main six characters as they explored the moon and they are depicted as the only people of the time to live on a moon. Season 2 established that they are part of a larger network of moon-dwelling astronauts and introduced three new recurring characters.

== Characters ==
=== Main ===
- Lunar Jim (Benny Zelkowicz), the main protagonist. He is an adventure- and mystery-loving astronaut with a blue spacesuit and is curious about his surroundings.
- Rover, a robot dog, who is always by Jim's side. Rover likes to play fetch and always helps Jim on his lunar missions. He speaks only in beeps and Jim and T.E.D are the only ones who can understand him.
- Ripple (Gil Anderson), the African-Canadian engineer on the moon and is the only female with a red spacesuit until Skye joins. She is always coming up with new inventions to help Jim and often helps him on his missions. She drives the Scooter.
- Eco (Jim Fowler), the farmer with a green spacesuit on the moon who works in the Eco dome growing plants and raising the animals. Eco loves to collect rocks and plants to study and help Jim. He doesn't typically go on missions because he is far too busy farming in the Eco dome. He usually drives the Hopper.
- T.E.D. (Technical Equipment Device) (John Davie), a humanoid robot. He is the clumsiest on the moon and his clumsiness creates some simple slapstick comedy. He is somewhat paranoid, being afraid of many non-existent things. However, he is quite smart and sometimes solves the problem in the story, though much of his main plot elements involve him being completely arrogant. T.E.D. represents a child and, essentially, the show's target audience.
- Pixel (Kristin Bell), the computer that helps Jim and his friends find things on the lunar surface and tells them their jobs for the day.
- Daisy, an anthropomorphized cow. Lunar Jim and his team get their milk from Daisy.
- Delores, an anthropomorphized chicken who yields eggs for the team.

In the second season, three additional characters were added to the show:

- Skye, a young trainee astronaut with an orange spacesuit who comes to Moonaluna for "hands-on" training.
- Yik Yak, a turtle-like alien who speaks in rhyme. He visits Jim and his friends often, but his visits usually result in some sort of unintentional problem. Although he only speaks in season 2, he does make a cameo in the first season.
- Zippity, A space mailman who sounds like a robot, but is never described as such.

=== Supporting ===
In the TV show, there are minor characters who make an appearance, and cause some trouble.

- Colby the Collector – Used to collect objects on the Moon to study. He makes more than one appearance and was he sent on the Moon before Jim and his friends arrived.
- The Garden-bot – Built by Ripple to help Eco garden, but malfunctions and destroys all the plants.
- The Lunar Worm – An anthropomorphic worm that lives in a compost crater who eats the peels of fruits and Jupiterbugs.
- The Fluffies– A small species of animals on the moon who reproduce on the double. They are sometimes seen in the background of a few episodes.

== Setting ==
=== Blue Moon L22 ===
Blue Moon L22 is the moon where the show takes place. For the show, the moon is divided into sectors (e.g. sector "L" or sector "12"). Each sector also contains certain locations, such as "The Crystal Caves" or "The Chime Flower Meadow". Lunar Jim usually explores these sectors in each episode and is always finding new ones.

=== Moonaluna ===
Moonaluna is the little settlement where Jim and his friends live. The settlement includes the Eco dome, Mission control, Jim's home, Ripple's home (never mentioned) and a windmill which is also never mentioned. Mission control is the building where Jim "gets lunar" and where all the vehicles are stored. The Eco dome is a lunar greenhouse which is the place where Eco is typically found farming and taking care of the livestock, Daisy and Dolores.

Jim's home is where he and Rover live and is often the place where each episode starts. In Season 2, the Moonport (a spaceship landing, refueling and repair port) is built, although few other spaceships visit. The places where T.E.D. or Eco live are never mentioned. In many episodes, it has been mentioned that there are other colonies of astronauts on the moon, but they're never seen in person.

=== Vehicles ===
When Jim "gets lunar", he chooses one of the following vehicles for his mission:

- Lunar Scrambler – The fastest vehicle on the moon. It is a blue scooter-like vehicle and is little and sleek for getting to a mission fast.
- Lunar Lifter – A yellow hovering vehicle. Its main use is using the built-in winch on the bottom.
- Lunar Scooter – Similar to the Scrambler, only it is red in color, has a winch at the bottom and is only used by Ripple when she accompanies Jim on a mission.
- Lunar Crawler – A red-orange simple backhoe on tracks. The vehicle's arm can be fully customizable with a selection of attachments that can be chosen for a mission and once had a voice control unit.
- Lunar Hopper – A green tractor-like vehicle and the only wheeled vehicle on the moon at the cost of being the slowest. It usually comes with a trailer and a winch.

== Episodes ==
The show aired as either a full 22-minute series with two segments in each episode, or as a single 11-minute episode with one segment.

=== Season 1 (2006) ===
| No. overall | No. in season | Title | Description | Writer | Original airdate |
|---|---|---|---|---|---|
| 1 | 1 | Meteor Mystery / That Sinking Feeling | When Rover and T.E.D get all twitchy and an oversized beanstalk grows out of control, there's a mystery to be solved and adventure to be had. Jim and the Moona Luna team zoom into action as they try to uncover the cause of all the confusion. Could Eco's runaway vines be the solution they need? When Jim is placing a new satellite dish in an area, he gets distracted by the glare of the satellite dish and accidentally drops Rover's ball in a dust puddle. He tries to get the ball but falls in the puddle himself. He gets stuck and is unable to get out and he can't call his friends for help because the dust has clogged his communicator. | Jeff Rosen / Pete Sauder | January 2, 2006 |
| 2 | 2 | Pest Problem / The Secret of Crystal Cave | Eco is distraught when some critter sneaks into his garden for a taste of moon melon rinds and blue moon banana peels. With some investigating, Jim and his friends find the culprit to be an adorable lunar worm with an appetite for compost. When all the lights in Moona Luna run out of batteries, Jim and his friends go to Crystal Cave to get crystals to replace the lights. But the crystals won't light up when they get to Moona Luna. | TBA | January 3, 2006 |
| 3 | 3 | The Moon Thief / That's Odd, Where's the Pod? | Some strange disappearances have Jim and the rest of his gang playing detective as they try to discover who stole their equipment, Gnordegrin the garden gnome and even tried to kidnap T.E.D! When the monthly supply pod that's scheduled to arrive is nowhere to be found, Jim and his friends try to look for it. | Jeff Rosen/Ian James Corlett | January 4, 2006 |
| 4 | 4 | Up, Up, and Away (Almost) / The Whistling Craters | When T.E.D's bungled attempt to drive the Lunar Crawler leaves them trapped inside a cave, it's up to Jim, Rover and Ripple to find themselves a means of escape. Putting their heads together, the team comes up with a solution that acknowledges the gravity of the situation. Jim and his friends hunt for the source of a whistling sound in the Ecodome. | Pete Sauder / Dennis Heaton | January 5, 2006 |
| 5 | 5 | Wrong Way, T.E.D / Running on Empty | When Rover goes missing, Jim and T.E.D are hot on his trail and find not only the robo-pup but a fabulous lunar playground. The problem is navigator T.E.D can't remember the way home. When Rover tries to jump over a lunar clam plant, the plant snatches his tail plug, causing Rover to lose his battery power. Meanwhile, when T.E.D gets sprayed by the lunar vehicle washer, his joints start squeaking. | TBA | January 6, 2006 |
| 6 | 6 | Jim Gets Mucky / Forget Me Nots | While Eco is on vacation, Jim and his friends do the work in the Ecodome for him. Meanwhile, Ripple has prepared a robot called the Gardenbot for a surprise for Eco when he gets back to Moona Luna. Lazily, T.E.D cons Ripple into turning on the Gardenbot so it can do the work for them, but when the Gardenbot crashes into a rock, it starts doing the opposite; it starts pulling out other plants. Jim and his friends have a lot of chores to do that day, but after collecting some flowers and smelling them, they suddenly forget which chores they're supposed to do. | TBA | January 7, 2006 |
| 7 | 7 | Recipe for Rover / Voice Recorder T.E.D | When the supply pod arrives in Moona Lunar, Jim and his friends discover that nothing's in there, so Jim reprograms the supply pod so it would go back to Earth. When they return to Moona Luna, they discover that Rover is still trapped inside the supply pod, so the heroes have to go back and get Rover out before the supply pod blasts off. However, the Lunar Hopper is the only vehicle that isn't broken, but it soon develops a flat tire, making it nearly impossible to get Rover out in time. Ripple has installed a voice control unit for the Lunar Crawler, but when T.E.D touches the voice unit, he becomes a voice recorder which makes him annoyed. When Jim climbs down to explore the cliffs, he is unable to get back up because the Crawler only responds to Jim's voice and he's too far away to be heard. So T.E.D tries to rescue Jim by playing back Jim's commands using his newly-found voice recorder unit. | TBA | January 9, 2006 |
| 8 | 8 | Real Slick, T.E.D / The Space Pirate | When Jim discovers an area of slippery lunar moss that's perfect for skating, he gets his friends to come over and try to skate on there. When T.E.D reluctantly tries to skate, he accidentally slips and gets stuck between two rocks, and is unable to break loose. After Eco tells everyone a story about a space pirate, the story appears to be becoming real when strange buzzing noises are heard every night. It becomes even more mysterious the next day, when everybody's chores are already done, and nobody claims that they did the chores. | TBA | January 10, 2006 |
| 9 | 9 | Puddle Predicament / The Chime Flowers | When Jim tries to get Eco a Purple Plutonian Pansy, he accidentally falls in a green puddle. When he gets out of the puddle, the goop becomes solid and Jim is stuck in there. So his friends have to figure out how to turn the goop into a liquid again so Jim can break free. When Ripple has gone missing, Jim searches for Ripple and finds out that Ripple is in a chime flower field, in which when anyone hears the music, they fall asleep. So Jim has to find a way to rescue Ripple without hearing the chime flower music. | TBA | January 11, 2006 |
| 10 | 10 | Mind and Muscle / Moonbubbles and Bellyburps | When Jim tries to get a blue lunar sapphire for Eco inside a cave, a gigantic blue sapphire rolls by and blocks the cave entrance, which is too big and heavy for them to push away using their muscles. The lunar worm is sick and has the stomach burps, so Jim and his friends search for Moonbubbles for the lunar worm, which is the only cure for its stomach burps. But the Moonbubbles are invisible, so Jim always squashes the Moonbubbles when he tries to pick them. | John de Klein / Pete Sauder | January 12, 2006 |
| 11 | 11 | The Big Switcheroo / A Little Moon Music | Ripple has invented a lunar teleporter machine, but the teleporter machine mixes up anything that's put inside there, so when Rover and T.E.D have a fight, they accidentally get into the machine and Rover now has T.E.D's body and T.E.D has Rover's body. T.E.D is the only one who knows how to fix the machine, but he has Rover's body, and is unable to operate it. When T.E.D accidentally breaks Ripple's keyboard instrument, Jim and his friends try to search for new musical instruments for Ripple. They've found four objects that have instrumental sounds, but none of the objects can make music themselves. | TBA | January 13, 2006 |
| 12 | 12 | Rover's Big Dig / The Big Sneeze Mystery | When Rover has dug up a Lunarsaurus bone, T.E.D becomes afraid that a Lunarsaurus will look for the bone, despite everyone assuring him that Lunarsauruses are extinct. The bone, which is seemingly useless, proves to be useful when a leg of the Control Tower is broken, and the bone is the perfect replacement leg. When Ripple sneezes uncontrollably whenever Rover is around her, it's suspected that Ripple has developed an allergy to Rover, but it turns out that Ripple is just allergic to Rover's new robot polish. | TBA | January 14, 2006 |
| 13 | 13 | Jim and T.E.D's Wild Ride / Too Many Fluffies | Eco doesn't want to feed the animals manually, so Ripple builds a remote control for Eco's feeder. But the remote control doesn't work for Eco's feeder. Instead, it causes other trouble, when the lights in Jim's house began flicking on and off for no reason, the music in the Eco Dome suddenly turns on, and then, while T.E.D's polishing Jim's Scrambler, the Scrambler blasts off itself, carrying T.E.D. Jim tries to rescue T.E.D using his Lunar Lifter, but just as he's about to catch T.E.D, the Lifter gets out of control. It's Lunar Winter, so Jim and his friends bring crystals from Crystal Cave back to Moona Luna for warmth. Then, a Fluffy arrives, so they decide to keep it as a pet. However, the Fluffies start reproducing uncontrollably and there's no more space, so they have to make the Fluffies leave. When they discover that the Fluffies are attracted to the crystals, they try to bring the Fluffies to Crystal Cave. | TBA | January 16, 2006 |
| 14 | 14 | Cosmic Kite / Crater Critter | Jim and his friends are flying kites, but when T.E.D tries to fly a kite, the wind blows him off the ground, and he gets stuck on a tall ridge. Jim has a ladder but he's unable to reach T.E.D because the wind's blowing the ladder, making it unsafe to climb. When Jim and T.E.D are taking place of a satellite dish, T.E.D finds a critter inside a crater so he decides to take the critter home. But the critter starts eating everything on sight. Another problem happens when the satellite dish stopped working because the vines next to the satellite dish have grown out of control and tangled the satellite dish. | TBA | January 17, 2006 |
| 15 | 15 | Lost and Found Friends / Space Junk | Eco has knitted Daisy a sweater, but since the sweater is to small for her, it's given to Rover instead. The sweater is proven to be useful when Jim and his friends explore a big cave and end up getting lost, when Rover uses the string of the sweater to mark their path. When the ground starts shaking, Jim and his friends go to see the reason and it turns out that some space junk have fallen and they've covered the lunar playground. So they remove the space junk, and build another playground using the materials. | TBA | January 18, 2006 |
| 16 | 16 | Ripple's Moon Blast-Off Board / Force Field Trampoline | When Jim explores the Lunar Fissure by scanning the fissure using Ripple's multi-tool, he accidentally drops the multi-tool inside. The fissure is very narrow, so none of the vehicles can fit inside it, but then Ripple realizes that her moon blast-off board is small enough to fit. The supply pod has lost control and is going to have a crash landing, so Jim and his friends have to find things that would cushion the impact of the supply pod's landing before it lands and breaks. | TBA | January 19, 2006 |
| 17 | 17 | The Falling Star / Big Bowling Bash | When a star has fallen from the sky, Jim and his friends try to send the star back into the sky, but they are unable to launch the star high enough. When Jim teaches T.E.D how to bowl, he starts to get infatuated with bowling. He reluctantly goes with Jim and his friends for a treasure search, but the cave with the treasure is blocked by large rocks. It turns out bowling is the solution to the answer when they notice a large boulder on a slope, which could be pushed to knock away the large rocks. | TBA | January 20, 2006 |
| 18 | 18 | Scooperbot Hide'n'Seek / Ripple's Web Sprayer | When Ripple invents a robot, called Scooperbot, which collects metal things, the robot takes away T.E.D's voice chip and hides away, so Jim and his friends have to find Scooperbot and try to get T.E.D's voice chip back from Scooperbot. When Jim and T.E.D have to put a signal light on a slope, T.E.D volunteers to do it by controlling the Lunar Crawler. But T.E.D accidentally breaks the emergency brake and the Crawler starts going backwards towards Stinky Lake. So Jim must figure out a way to stop the Crawler from going further. | TBA | January 21, 2006 |
| 19 | 19 | Moon Mischief / Short Circuit Gloves | After a meteor shower hits the moon, Jim and T.E.D go to stack the meteors up, but T.E.D is frightened because the stacked meteors look like monsters. Meanwhile, a lunar gopher has entered the Eco Dome and he starts pulling out Eco's plants just for fun. Annoyed, Eco tries to get Jim to help, but none of the suggestions are working because the gopher is fast and able to jump over fences. When Jim is asked to measure the lengths of lunar craters, Ripple gives Jim heating gloves to wear because the crater area is very cold. When problems happen when after Jim measures the craters, everything Jim touches and starts malfunctioning, including Ripple's multi-tool, Rover and then T.E.D. | TBA | February 13, 2006 |
| 20 | 20 | I'm Like a Bird / Lunar Lily Pads | When Jim and his friends are on a mission, a lunar loon takes away the Scrambler's chain, and the Scrambler's unable to fly without the chain. The lunar loon refuses to give it back, so they have to make the lunar loon open its mouth and drop the chain. When Jim finds floating lunar lily pads, he brings them home to show to his friends. When Jim finds out Eco isn't there, they realize that when Eco's collecting mushrooms, he accidentally parked the Hopper into a lunar mud puddle, and the vehicle is sinking, so Jim and his friends must figure out how to get the Hopper out of the puddle. | TBA | February 20, 2006 |
| 21 | 21 | The Topsy Turvy Zone / Robo Puzzle | After Jim and his friends visit the Topsy-Turvy zone, Jim mysteriously starts doing things backwards, such as driving and walking backwards, uprooting plants, bringing in the garbage, having breakfast at dinnertime, and sleeping in the daytime. So everyone tries to figure out what did Jim do to make him start doing things backward. After a meteor shower, Jim and his friends find Colby the Collector stuck under a meteor, with his body parts disassembled. So they try to get his pieces reassembled, but the pieces don't seem to fit each other. | TBA | April 7, 2006 |
| 22 | 22 | Lunar Litter Bugs / Rhyme Me a River | The garbage pipeline seems to be broken when all the garbage has been coming on the sides of Stinky Lake instead of in the Recycler. So Jim has to dive into Stinky Lake to check out the reason. At first, Jim is hesitant because the lake is stinky and looks dangerous, but then realizes that it's beautiful down there and there's no danger. When Jim and his friends are discovering new places, T.E.D finds an interesting rock and takes it with him. Then, he suddenly starts a rhyming trait and rhymes every sentence, but once they get back home, T.E.D stops rhyming and everyone else seems to start rhyming. | TBA | April 8, 2006 |
| 23 | 23 | Incredible Shrinking T.E.D / Rover's Rocket Roamer | When Jim and Ripple bring home a Shrinkberry plant for Eco, T.E.D accidentally touches the juice of a berry of the plant and shrinks, becoming tiny. So Jim and his friends have to find something that would make T.E.D big again. The supply pod has lost control and has landed on a ledge under the Lunar Cliffs. Someone has to push the key to get the supply pod back up, but no one can reach the button using their hands while driving a vehicle. | TBA | April 10, 2006 |
| 24 | 24 | T.E.D and the Beanstalk / Moon Pixies | When Jim and T.E.D are collecting lunar seeds for Eco, T.E.D loses his balance while carrying a heavy seed so trips over Jim, making Jim, T.E.D and Rover all fall into a deep ravine. They're unable to get out because it's too steep to climb up and all the vehicles are too big to get into the ravine and get them out. Mysterious things start happening in Moona Luna when Eco's Hopper's wheels have come off for no reason, Ripple's tools start moving by themselves and T.E.D's had suddenly getting turned backwards. The pranksters turn out to be moon pixies, which are tiny creatures that live in Orbit Orchids. | TBA | April 17, 2006 |
| 25 | 25 | Lunar Attraction / The Floating Fruit | When Jim and his friends are watching a comet flyover, a part of the comet crashes in the moon, which hits T.E.D in the head. After the hit, T.E.D loses his memory because the impact made the memory chip bounce out of his head so they find that the memory chip is stuck inside a rock, but the rock's opening is too small for anybody's hands to reach it. When Jim discovers two different types of lunar fruit, he brings them home. After finding out that the fruits are safe to eat, they eat the fruit, but afterwards, Jim starts floating and Eco feels heavy and is unable to move. | TBA | April 18, 2006 |
| 26 | 26 | Cowbot T.E.D / A Surprise for Jim | It's a rootin' tootin' time at the Moona Luna corral as T.E.D goes to the West and somehow manages to save the day and Delores with his lassoing skills. Happy birthday Jim! It's a fun-filled mission for Jim as he travels around the moon looking for clues that lead to a big surprise. | TBA | April 19, 2006 |

=== Season 2 (2007) ===
| No. overall | No. in season | Title | Description | Original airdate |
|---|---|---|---|---|
| 27 | 1 | Tag the Dog / Homemade Circus | Rover's dog tag falls off while he's testing Ripple's Space Springers, and he loses his sense of direction. He discovered high up on a column in Crazy Column Cave. Jim uses the Space Springers to jump up to Rover and find him. T.E.D. is completely disappointed when the Super Space Circus has to cancel their visit to MoonaLuna at the final minute. The day is saved when each of the others transforms a work activity into a circus act. | September 24, 2007 |
| 28 | 2 | T.E.D.'s Big Bang Boomerang / Magnetic Personality | A blade on the fan of the Ecodome heater has broken, and it's getting dangerously cold for the plants. Luckily, a replacement fan blade is scheduled to arrive on the Supply Pod. T.E.D. has trouble figuring out how to use Ripple's new magnetizer – magnetizing himself instead of other objects. But when Rover gets abandoned on the thin ice of Glassy Lake, it's a magnetized T.E.D., who is lowered down to Rover to lift him off the ice and save the day. | September 25, 2007 |
| 29 | 3 | Moon Mole Madness / Ted & the Stick-um Plant | The base is in need of power stones that Ripple has discovered and buried under the lunar surface. The only problem is that the surface is too hard for shovels, drills, or the Earth Eater to break through. When T.E.D. inadvertently sticks himself to Delores with Eco's sticky tree tar, his hand pops free when it comes in contact with Ripple's frozen lunar berry treats. Who knew lunar berries had that kind of property? | September 26, 2007 |
| 30 | 4 | March of the Fluffies / Lunar Laser Flies | The Fluffies are on their annual march, and nothing can stop their forward progress as they head for the lunar berry fields. When Pixel reveals that they're marching straight toward a deep canyon, something that can function as a bridge has to be found quickly. T.E.D. ends up being the bridge, and the Fluffies cross safely. Jim, T.E.D. and Rover investigate a strange glow in a cave. Its lunar laser flies, who become attracted to T.E.D. when he inadvertently gets some of their goopy food on him. | September 27, 2007 |
| 31 | 5 | Poppin' Pancakes / Night Light | Yik Yak has arrived to share a treat from his home planet with the Moona Luna gang – Poppin' Pancakes. These special pancakes start as a small ball of dough, then pop and expand to 100 times its size. But until anyone can chow down, Jim has to go on a mission. Skye is preparing a class assignment on night and day. When Ripple announces a distant solar panel is malfunctioning, Jim, T.E.D. and Skye go out to fix it. | September 28, 2007 |
| 32 | 6 | Moonshrooms / Leaf Thief | Jim, Skye and T.E.D. have discovered some colourful small plants on a fruitless mission to locate some moon clover for Daisy. Jim gives one little plant to Eco, Skye gives one to Ripple, and Jim saves one for his house. To his dismay, he and Eco discover that the plant is called a Moonshroom, and it grows very quickly once a year. It's a very hot day on Moona Luna. Eco has found a lunar grove where it's nice and shady. But when they arrive, all the leaves from the moon trees are gone! It's too hot to stay outside, so back to the Ecodome they go – only to discover that leaves are missing from Eco's apple trees. There's a leaf thief on Moona Luna! | October 1, 2007 |
| 33 | 7 | Let's Get Balloonar! / Tight Squeeze | Jim and Skye search out the source of some mysterious large balloon-shaped orbs that seem to be rising from Bottomless Crevasse. Skye ignores Jim's warning about getting too close to the edge of the crevasse, and they both slide to the bottom. Yik Yak is spellbounded by the sound of air escaping from tires – it reminds him of music back on his home planet. As the gang heads out to clear some meteorites from a Supply Cave opening, Yik Yak slows their departure by deflating one of the Hopper's tires so the escaping air can accompany his song of farewell. | October 2, 2007 |
| 34 | 8 | Popper Berries / Moonport Blues | Eco is going to bake some Popper berry pie, so Jim, Skye, Rover and T.E.D. set out to pick some. The only problem is that the berries pop when they're touched. How can they be picked? After much discussion, our team puts bright blue landing lights instead of red ones on the Moonport. But spaceships stop landing at the Moonport. Rover notices that the spaceships are landing in another spot. | October 3, 2007 |
| 35 | 9 | The Lunar Twist / A Prickly Problem | T.E.D. discovers a creature called a Dansilla, which only communicates through dancing movements. While trying to teach it the Lunar Twist – his favourite dance – T.E.D. gets his leg trapped in a lunar rock pile. It's up to the Dansilla to try and communicate to the Moona Luna gang that T.E.D. is in trouble and needs their help. A satellite dish is broken and needs to be replaced. When Jim and the gang arrive to replace it, they're bombarded with thistles by nearby plants. | October 4, 2007 |
| 36 | 10 | Copy That, Jim! / The Space Chompster | Skye has made a new substance – called Clomp – in her lab at the Lunar Academy. It starts off soft, but hardens quite quickly – perfect for making moulds and sculptures. When a gear breaks on the base's water pump, a perfect replacement needs to be found quickly! Jim and Ripple have ordered a surprise for Eco – a "Choo Choo" plant. But when Zippity delivers it, there appears to have been something else in the cargo bay – a voracious Space Chompster! | October 5, 2007 |
| 37 | 11 | The Missing Astronaut / Comet Atchou | The gang receives an SOS from a stricken spaceship. They manage to bring it in to the Moonport by remote control, but discovered there is no one on board. A search turns up an escape pod fired from the ship, but with only a wilted plant inside. Where is the astronaut? Comet Atchou - a rare comet - passes over Moona Luna, sprinkling everyone with its sparkly dust. A little while later, Jim, Ripple and Eco unaccountably freeze, statue-like, while Rover, T.E.D. and Skye – who has a bad cold – are unaffected. | October 8, 2007 |
| 38 | 12 | Where's Jupiterbug? / Hatching A Plan | Zippity has left a rare Jupiterbug with the gang for safekeeping while he makes a special delivery for Eco. When T.E.D. unwittingly lets the bug out of its terrarium, the race to find it is on – made more difficult by the bug's chameleon-like ability to change colour. A spheroid-shaped UFO has appeared on Moona Luna. The gang takes it back to the base, and discovers it's an egg. They try to hatch it by various means, but are unsuccessful until they return it to where they found it – the place where the conditions were perfect in the first place. | October 9, 2007 |
| 39 | 13 | The Lunar Leaper / The No-See-Um Ray | A Lunar Leaper has leapt onto Moona Luna and threatens the base with its reverberating jumps. All attempts to tire it out fail, until Jim remembers the soothing music he uses to lull himself to sleep. Yik Yak's No-See-Um Ray has turned Eco's apple tree and Daisy invisible. Its antidote, the Peekaboo Ray, has fallen somewhere on Moona Luna. It's found in the nest of a protective Lunar Loon. T.E.D. has to turn himself invisible to retrieve the Peekaboo Ray, and thus bring back Daisy and Eco's apple tree to visibility. | October 10, 2007 |
| 40 | 14 | The Homeless Crab / The Bouncing Buzzpip | Jim and the gang try to find a new home for a little Lunar Crab, who has outgrown its old one. They try various possibilities – a box, a flowerpot, a moon melon rind – but finally discover that a hollow rock Jim and Rover found is perfect for the little crab. Skye needs to get a photo of the elusive Bouncing Buzzpip for a project at the Lunar Academy. Many people have tried, but the Buzzpip will never stay still long enough. | October 11, 2007 |
| 41 | 15 | T.E.D.'s Pet / Yik Yak in the Crater | Zippity has brought T.E.D. a new pet. Everyone else thinks it's just a rock, but T.E.D. insists it's every special rock, named Jeffrey. He teaches it tricks, takes it for walks, lets it have a nap, and finds other moon rock friends for it. While T.E.D. and Yik Yak are fooling around out at Crater Corner, Yik Yak gets firmly stuck in a crater. All attempts to free him fail, until Eco realizes he can use the pent up gas from his barrel of Fizzyberry juice to blow Yik Yak out of his trap in the crater. | October 12, 2007 |
| 42 | 16 | Wind Power / Lunar Legs | T.E.D. creates havoc when he reverses the motor on Ripple's vacuum cleaner and blows Zippity right up his conveyor belt into his Mail Rocket. But when Rover is trapped in a Supply Cave by a rockslide, all attempts to free him fail until T.E.D. realizes the motor on the Sampler can be reversed. After rescuing Yik Yak – who has gotten himself stuck in a plant – by using some Yik Yak SlikSlak, (a lubricant from Yik Yak's planet), Jim learns the Yik Yak handshake – high five, low five, palm tickle. Yik Yak has the opportunity to help Eco and Ripple with his Slik Slak – and teach them his handshake, too. When Jim, Eco and Ripple come down with Lunar Legs – an ailment which causes their legs to move crazily for a while - no one can figure out how they got it. | October 15, 2007 |
| 43 | 17 | Moonbeard's Treasure / Rocket Pack T.E.D. | Jim discovers an ancient treasure map hidden by Moonbeard, an ancient Space Pirate. It promises a treasure of "Ruby, sapphire, emerald, gold". The gang has to decipher three clues to find the treasure – which turns out to be the root-ball of a tree. They plant it, and a Rainbow Tree sprouts, revealing branches of "ruby, sapphire, emerald, and gold". T.E.D. disobeys Ripple's wishes and tries out her new invention, a rocket pack. There's only one problem – he doesn't know how to land! Both Jim and Skye try to rescue him – unsuccessfully. Ripple's Space Pillow Foam – invented to protect Delores' eggs from breaking – is hastily spread over the Moonport just as T.E.D.'s fuel runs out above them. | October 16, 2007 |
| 44 | 18 | Skater T.E.D. / Space Symphony | T.E.D. liked practising on his new skateboard. The only problem? He keeps getting in everyone else's way! But when the Scrambler breaks down on a mission to get some Cosmic Cactus juice for Zippity to take on an emergency run to another base, it's T.E.D. who saves the day. The Moona Luna gang is going to perform a live music piece for an intergalactic telecast. But T.E.D. doesn't have an instrument! He and Jim set off to find one. | October 17, 2007 |
| 45 | 19 | Scrambled T.E.D. / The Real Ripple | T.E.D. hits his head on Zippity's mail hatch door as he rushes to get his latest copy of his favourite comic "Rocket Robot". His circuits get scrambled and he thinks he's Rocket Robot. Ripple is accidentally duplicated by a space copier. Confronted by two Ripples, the gang has to figure out which one is genuine? Luckily, a "likes and dislikes" quiz T.E.D. gave everyone at the start of the show provides the clue to revealing the real Ripple. | October 18, 2007 |
| 46 | 20 | A Sticky Situation / The Squawker | Eco and Skye, and then Jim, get stuck to a fruit while trying to pick it. Ripple comes to the rescue, but it's Rover, who notices birds can land on and take off from the fruit without any problem – after they've landed on a nearby bush. Closer examination reveals pollen on the bush's flowers, which negates the stickiness on the fruit. A baby bird's loud squawks are disturbing everyone and making work impossible. Attempts to calm it down are all unsuccessful, unless T.E.D. is present. The problem is the baby bird keeps pecking at the coloured wristband that T.E.D. is wearing to remind him of the chores he has to do. Eventually, they realize that the colour of T.E.D.'s wristband reminds the baby of its mom's feathers. | October 19, 2007 |

== Telecast and home media ==
The show was both premiered in Canada and Latin America on 2 January 2006, on CBC Television and Discovery Kids Latin America, respectively.

Other broadcasters who premiered/acquired the show at the time included ABC TV in Australia on 14 March, CBeebies in the United Kingdom on 3 April (where it was re-dubbed with British voice actors), KiKA in Germany on 13 April (with ZDF premiering the series at a later date following KiKA) and CBC's French-language system Ici Radio-Canada Télé on 15 April. Other broadcasters who acquired the show included France 5 in France, have planned to premiere the show within a Fall 2006 window.

The show was also aired on the Spanish-language V-me in the U.S. along with foreign broadcasters: TG4 (Gaelic-language) in Ireland, Cultura in Brazil, Canal Panda in Portugal, MiniMini in Poland, EBS in South Korea, NRK Super in Norway, Boomerang in Spain, ABC 4 Kids in Australia, Nickelodeon in the Netherlands, eToonz in South Africa and Hop! Channel in Israel since 2007.

On 9 October 2006, Alliance Atlantis appointed BBC Worldwide as the British DVD license for the show. The show's first British DVD release, titled "Let's Get Lunar", was released within that week and contains 10 episodes.

As of 2023, the show is currently streaming on Tubi in English, but the show's original language is heard after not airing over the air in the U.S. for many years.
