= Buzz and Tell =

- Genre: Game Show; Comedy
- Created by: Jon Doyle
- Voices of: Karl Woolley; Rebecca Courtney; Keith Wickham; Marc Silk
- Composer: Richard Taylor
- Original language: English
- No. of series: 1
- No. of episodes: 52

Production
- Running time: 5 Minutes
- Production company: Impossible Kids

Original release
- Network: CBeebies

Buzz and Tell is a CBeebies programme created and produced by Jon Doyle. It is a comedy puppet panel show following a format that parodies University Challenge.

== Format ==
There are five contestants in each episode. Each show begins with a humorous introduction from each contestant. These introductions are normally centred around one specific theme, e.g. their interests or their aspirations.

Each show includes a "missing word round", a "picture round", a "numbers round", a "sound round" and "general knowledge". The latter round does not occur in every episode, however. Once the correct answer is given to a question, that contestant will be awarded one point. There have been several rare instances where everyone has buzzed in at once, and the host has allowed each contestant to receive one point each.

In the instance of any two or more contestants with the same level of points, the host will give a tie breaker question based on simple general knowledge. Once this question is answered correctly, that contestant will win the game. It is unclear whether those who do not have the greatest number of points are allowed to answer the tie breaker question or not.

At the end of each episode, the winner receives a silly prize; for example, Mr. Biscuits once was given a wooden spoon.

The main running gag in each episode in the host's increased frustration through each question as the contestants fail to answer simple questions, even those with the answer worded in the question, e.g. "'The tooth fairy visits when a wobbly, "what" falls out?", or "What colour is an orange?" The contestants can also frequently go off topic from the question they need to answer and chat amongst themselves, further annoying the host.

== Characters ==
Different contestants appear in different episodes. Mr. Biscuits and Charles Cheese have appeared in every episode alongside Walter Flipstick, the quizmaster.

- Host: Walter Flipstick – He is a walrus who is the long suffering quizmaster of the show. He always tries to move through the questions at speed and control his unruly contestants. It is unknown where Walter sits as his podium is never seen on the same screen as where the contestants sit. Despite this, it can be implied he sits somewhere to the contestants' left, as Walter regularly turns towards his right when he is asking the questions.
- Orange Bernard – He is an orangutan who is obsessed with bananas. His greatest achievement is the ability to eat a banana sideways. In the Christmas special episode, Bernard swapped places with Walter, who allowed him to be the quizmaster only for the tie breaker question (which Walter, as a contestant, answered correctly instantly).
- Ken Koala – He is a very shy koala with an Australian accent. Despite his shyness, he is depicted as the contestant with the most knowledge of all the contestants.
- Karl – He is a squirrel with a large knowledge of nuts. He is depicted as being very foregetful around the simplest of things. Consequently, Karl regularly forgets to press his buzzer, and once reminded by an irritated Walter, often forgets the answer he was going to give.
- Miss Honkover – She is an exotic bird who loves singing at the most inappropriate of times during the show. Walter frequently has to stop her due to this, and focus her back on the questions.
- Callista Croak – She is a frog who loves to keep fit, and aspires to be the fittest frog in the world one day.
- Charles Cheese – He is a mouse with a cheese fascination. He is also the smallest of all the contestants.
- Melanie Wiggles – She is a rabbit who studies carrots.
- Henrietta Peck – She is a very large chicken who is often joined by one of her eggs hatching into a deep-voiced chick partway through the show. Her chick always gives the correct answer to each question, without fail, giving Henrietta an advantage.
- Mr. Biscuits – He is a dog who likes biscuits.
- B1N – He is a rubbish bin robot made from a pedal bin. B1N frequently gives a ridiculous answer to every question, which he claims to be due to all the rubbish he is filled with each episode, causing him to give those answers in return. Walter often has to ask him to power down if he ever overheats during the show.

== Episodes ==
Episode	Guest Contestants	Winner	Prize	Answers
1	Melanie Wiggles, Karl, Henrietta Peck, Charles Cheese, Mr Biscuits	Karl	A great big nut	Alive (Missing Word round), Duck's Bill (Picture round), 4 (Numbers round), The Seaside (Sound round), Saturday (General Knowledge)
2	Melanie Wiggles, Karl, Henrietta Peck, Charles Cheese, Mr Biscuits	Henrietta Peck	A day out on the farm	Up the hill to fetch a pail of water (Missing word round), Bicycle Bell (Picture round), 4 (Numbers round), Elephant (Sound round), Football (General Knowledge)
3	Melanie Wiggles, Karl, Henrietta Peck, Charles Cheese, Mr Biscuits	Charles Cheese	A cheese flavoured "scratch & sniff" card	Corner (Missing word round), Wellie Boot (Picture round), Airplane (Sound round), Circus (General Knowledge)
4	Melanie Wiggles, Karl, Henrietta Peck, Charles Cheese, Mr Biscuits	Henrietta Peck	A pair of skis	Wall (Missing word round), Person's Nose (Picture round), 3 (Numbers round), Birds singing in the trees (Sound round)
5	Melanie Wiggles, Karl, Henrietta Peck, Charles Cheese, Mr Biscuits	Henrietta Peck	Some straw	Star (Missing word round), Tortoise (Picture round), 8 (Numbers round), Sizzling Sausages (Sound round), Sand (General Knowledge)
6	Melanie Wiggles, Karl, Henrietta Peck, Charles Cheese, Mr Biscuits	Mr Biscuits	A year supply of tomato ketchup	Plum (Missing word round), Snake (Picture round), 2 (Numbers round), Donkey (Sound round), Tomato (General Knowledge)
7	Melanie Wiggles, Karl, Henrietta Peck, Charles Cheese, Mr Biscuits	Henrietta Peck and Chick	A holiday for two in Turkey	Sun (Missing word round), Slide (Picture round), 8 (Numbers round), Fly (Sound round), Winter (General Knowledge)
8	Melanie Wiggles, Karl, Henrietta Peck, Charles Cheese, Mr Biscuits	Melanie Wiggles	A handy set of spanners	Down (Missing word round), Mushroom (Picture round), 4 (Numbers round), Dog (Sound round), Red (General Knowledge), Stripes (Tiebreaker question)
9	Melanie Wiggles, Karl, Henrietta Peck, Charles Cheese, Mr Biscuits	Charles Cheese	A pair of Walter Flipstick's old shoes	Men (Missing word round), Trumpet (Picture round), 4 (Numbers round), Train Whistle (Sound round), Puppy (General Knowledge)
10	Melanie Wiggles, Karl, Henrietta Peck, Charles Cheese, Mr Biscuits	Mr Biscuits	An orange wig	Boat (Missing word round), Icing Bun (Picture round), Horse (Sound round), Bathroom (General Knowledge)
11	Miss Honkover, Ken Koala, Orange Bernard, Charles Cheese, Mr Biscuits	Ken Koala	A big honky horn	See (Missing word round), Frying Pan (Picture round), 5 (Numbers round), Ship's Horn (Sound round), Meow (General Knowledge)
12	Miss Honkover, Ken Koala, Orange Bernard, Charles Cheese, Mr Biscuits	Ken Koala	A cream cake	Shop (Missing word round), Plate of Beans (Picture round), 2 (Numbers round), Drumroll (Sound round), Queen (General Knowledge)
13	Melanie Wiggles, Karl, Henrietta Peck, Charles Cheese, Mr Biscuits	Mr Biscuits	A giant football	Sea (Missing word round), Toothbrush (Picture round), 5 (Numbers round), Whistle (Sound round), Moon (General Knowledge)
14	Melanie Wiggles, Karl, Henrietta Peck, Charles Cheese, Mr Biscuits	Mr Biscuits	A huge bowl of oranges	Peppers (Missing word round), Doorknob (Picture round), 3 (Numbers round), Saw (Sound round), Orange Juice (General Knowledge)
15	Melanie Wiggles, Karl, Henrietta Peck, Charles Cheese, Mr Biscuits	Mr Biscuits	A selection of cheeses	Your house down (Missing word round), Bee (Picture round), 2 (Numbers round), Water running away down the plughole (Sound round)
16	Melanie Wiggles, Karl, Henrietta Peck, Charles Cheese, Mr Biscuits	Melanie Wiggles	A trip to the seaside	Moon (Missing word round), Tennis Racket (Picture round), 4 (Numbers round), Doorbell (Sound round), Wool (General Knowledge)
17	Melanie Wiggles, Karl, Henrietta Peck, Charles Cheese, Mr Biscuits	Melanie Wiggles	A lovely box of false moustaches	Rain (Missing word round), Mug (Picture round), 4 (Numbers round), Gargling (Sound round), Breakfast (General Knowledge)
18	Miss Honkover, Ken Koala, Orange Bernard, Charles Cheese, Mr Biscuits	Miss Honkover	Some bird seed	Wool (Missing word round), Snail (Picture round), 6 (Numbers round), Owl (Sound round), April (General Knowledge)
19	Miss Honkover, Ken Koala, Orange Bernard, Charles Cheese, Mr Biscuits	Miss Honkover	To sing one of her beautiful songs...	Shoe (Missing word round), Golf Club (Picture round), 4 (Numbers round), Cow (Sound round)
20	Miss Honkover, Ken Koala, Orange Bernard, Charles Cheese, Mr Biscuits	Ken Koala	A ride on a camel	Lamb (Missing word round), Cactus (Picture round), 4 (Numbers round), Thunder (Sound round)
21	Miss Honkover, Ken Koala, Orange Bernard, Charles Cheese, Mr Biscuits	Ken Koala	An umbrella to keep of the rain in a storm	Fair (Missing word round), Bucket (Picture round), 3 (Numbers round), Lion (Sound round), Piglet (Tiebreaker question)
22	Miss Honkover, Ken Koala, Orange Bernard, Charles Cheese, Mr Biscuits	Mr Biscuits	A bunch of balloons	Farm (Missing word round), Football (Picture round), 8 (Numbers round), Piano (Sound round), Orange (General Knowledge)
23	Miss Honkover, Ken Koala, Orange Bernard, Charles Cheese, Mr Biscuits	Mr Biscuits	A banana (but he said Orange Bernard could have it)	Stream (Missing word round), Clock (Picture round), 5 (Numbers round), Car Horn (Sound round)
24	Miss Honkover, Ken Koala, Orange Bernard, Charles Cheese, Mr Biscuits	Ken Koala	A lovely small, miniature, tiny drum	Toes (Missing word round), Saucepan (Picture round), 2 (Numbers round), Cat Meowing (Sound round), Trees (General Knowledge)
25	Miss Honkover, Ken Koala, Orange Bernard, Charles Cheese, Mr Biscuits	Miss Honkover	Some singing lessons...	Round and round (Missing word round), Carrot (Picture round), 3 (Numbers round), Smashing Glass (Sound round)
26	Miss Honkover, Ken Koala, Orange Bernard, Charles Cheese, Mr Biscuits	Charles Cheese	A giant coconut	Hair (Missing word round), Watering Can (Picture round), 1 (Numbers round), Wolf (Sound round)
27	Miss Honkover, Ken Koala, Orange Bernard, Charles Cheese, Mr Biscuits	Orange Bernard	A large banana	Happy (Missing word round), Painting (Picture round), 4 (Numbers round), Splash (Sound round)
28	Miss Honkover, Ken Koala, Orange Bernard, Charles Cheese, Mr Biscuits	Mr Biscuits	A charming wooden spoon	Water (Missing word round), Seesaw (Picture round), 4 (Numbers round), Horse Walking (Sound round), Spoon (General Knowledge)
29	Miss Honkover, Ken Koala, Orange Bernard, Charles Cheese, Mr Biscuits	Charles Cheese	A beautiful Balloon	Green (Missing word round), Spider (Picture round), 5 (Numbers round), Clapping (Sound round)
30	Miss Honkover, Ken Koala, Orange Bernard, Charles Cheese, Mr Biscuits	Miss Honkover	A large ice-lolly	Kettle (Missing word round), Pencil (Picture round), 6 (Numbers round), Firework (Sound round)
31	Calista Croak, Karl, B1N, Charles Cheese, Mr Biscuits	Karl	A pirate hat	Plate (Missing word round), Giraffe (Picture round), 2 (Numbers round), Door (Sound round)
32	Calista Croak, Karl, B1N, Charles Cheese, Mr Biscuits	Calista Croak	A lovely cucumber sandwich	Wall (Missing word round), Thumb (Picture round), 1 (Numbers round), Quacking (Sound round), Triangle (General Knowledge)
33	Calista Croak, Karl, B1N, Charles Cheese, Mr Biscuits	Calista Croak	A big broom for sweeping up leaves	Hive (Missing word round), Toes (Picture round), 5 (Numbers round), Grunting (Sound round), Leaves (General Knowledge)
34	Calista Croak, Karl, B1N, Charles Cheese, Mr Biscuits	Calista Croak	A ladder to get Calista down. (She had jumped off-screen after winning)	Leaves (Missing word round), Cone (Picture round), 3 (Numbers round), Laughing (Sound round), Frog (Tiebreaker question)
35	Calista Croak, Karl, B1N, Charles Cheese, Mr Biscuits	Karl	Some nutty bubble bath	Honey (Missing word round), Cucumber (Picture round), 3 (Numbers round), Motorbike (Sound round)
36	Calista Croak, Karl, B1N, Charles Cheese, Mr Biscuits	Charles Cheese	A toy car	Trees (Missing word round), Guitar (Picture round), 4 (Numbers round), Car (Sound round)
37	Calista Croak, Karl, B1N, Charles Cheese, Mr Biscuits	Mr Biscuits	A great big tomato	Market (Missing word round), Sponge (Picture round), 5 (Numbers round), Chicken clucking (Sound round), Red Tomatoes (General Knowledge)
38	Calista Croak, Karl, B1N, Charles Cheese, Mr Biscuits	Charles Cheese	Some special cheese flavoured ice-cream	Road (Missing word round), Snowman (Picture round), 1 (Numbers round), Ice Cream Van (Sound round)
39	Calista Croak, Karl, B1N, Charles Cheese, Mr Biscuits	B1N	A mountain climbing holiday	Track (Missing word round), Rubber Ring (Picture round), 3 (Numbers round), Monkey (Sound round)
40	Calista Croak, Karl, B1N, Charles Cheese, Mr Biscuits	Calista Croak	An exercise bike	Moo (Missing word round), Comb (Picture round), 2 (Numbers round), Wind Howling (Sound round)
41	Calista Croak, Karl, B1N, Charles Cheese, Mr Biscuits	B1N	A new bin liner	Grass (Missing word round), Tent (Picture round), 5 (Numbers round), Mouse Squeak (Sound round)
42	Calista Croak, Karl, B1N, Charles Cheese, Mr Biscuits	Calista Croak	An enormous towel	Pillow (Missing word round), Crane (Picture round), 2 (Numbers round), Tree falling over (Sound round), Towel (General Knowledge)
43	Calista Croak, Karl, B1N, Charles Cheese, Mr Biscuits	Karl	A bell	Water (Missing word round), Hose (Picture round), 1 (Numbers round), Church Bells (Sound round)
44	Calista Croak, Karl, B1N, Charles Cheese, Mr Biscuits	Mr Biscuits	A trip to the National Moustache Museum	Tree (Missing word round), Spoon (Picture round), 4 (Numbers round), Xylophone (Sound round)
45	Calista Croak, Karl, B1N, Charles Cheese, Mr Biscuits	Calista Croak	A splendid garden fork	Foot (Missing word round), Garden fork (Picture round), 5 (Numbers round), Sheep (Sound round)
46	Melanie Wiggles, Ken Koala, Orange Bernard, Charles Cheese, Mr Biscuits	Ken Koala	A sink plunger	Tuesday (Missing word round), Potato (Picture round), 4 (Numbers round), Road Drill (Sound round)
47	Melanie Wiggles, Ken Koala, Orange Bernard, Charles Cheese, Mr Biscuits	Melanie Wiggles	A huge carrot	Television (Missing word round), Brick (Picture round), 4 (Numbers round), Someone slurping a drink (Sound round), Beanstalk (Tiebreaker question)
48	Melanie Wiggles, Ken Koala, Orange Bernard, Charles Cheese, Mr Biscuits	Ken Koala	A strawberry yoghurt	Car (Missing word round), Penguin (Picture round), 4 (Numbers round), Telephone (Sound round)
49	Melanie Wiggles, Ken Koala, Orange Bernard, Charles Cheese, Mr Biscuits	Mr Biscuits	A years supply of toast	Mane (Missing word round), Light Bulb (Picture round), 5 (Numbers round), Parrot (Sound round)
50	Melanie Wiggles, Ken Koala, Orange Bernard, Charles Cheese, Mr Biscuits	Mr Biscuits	A box of biscuits	Tooth (Missing word round), Book (Picture round), 2 (Numbers round), Vacuum Cleaner (Sound round)
51	Melanie Wiggles, Ken Koala, Orange Bernard, Charles Cheese, Mr Biscuits	Ken Koala	A French loaf of bread	Run (Missing word round), Sunglasses (Picture round), 4 (Numbers round), Dinosaurs (Sound round)
52	Melanie Wiggles, Ken Koala, Orange Bernard, Charles Cheese, Mr Biscuits	Walter Flipstick	A big bucket of fish	Nose (Missing word round), Christmas Tree (Picture round), 2 (Numbers round), Jingle Bells (Sound round), Carrot (Tiebreaker question)
