= Boogie Beebies =

- Genre: Children's television series
- Directed by: Helen Darrington; Karen Ferguson; Brendan McCaul
- Presented by: Pete Hillier (Series 1-2); Nataylia Roni (Series 1); Oti Mabuse
- Music by: Liz Kitchen, Francis Haines
- Opening theme: Come and Dance with Boogie Beebies
- Ending theme: We've Danced with Boogie Beebies
- Country of origin: United Kingdom
- Original language: English
- No. of seasons: 3
- No. of episodes: 125

Production
- Executive producer: Sue Nott
- Producer: Karen Pringle
- Editors: Damian Raistrick, David Horwell, Jim Baker, Gary Hewson
- Camera setup: John Shuker; Bart Baker
- Running time: 15 minutes (Series 1-2); 5 minutes (Series 3)
- Production companies: BBC (Series 1-2); BBC Children's Productions (Series 3)

Original release
- Network: CBeebies
- Release: 27 September 2004 – 2006

Boogie Beebies is a British interactive preschool children's television programme, which was produced and broadcast by the BBC. It aired on CBeebies (both the separate channel and CBeebies on BBC One and BBC Two). The show first aired on 27 September 2004, and won the Best Pre School Live Action award, at the BAFTA Children's Awards in 2005.

Every programme is 15 minutes long, and teaches children a dance (to a short original soundtrack), a different one every week. It was originally presented by Nataylia "Nat" Roni and Pete Hillier. Nat had previously played the role of 'Nala' in the West End with Disney in The Lion King. However, from November 2006, it was presented by Pete alone along with a new group of children called the 'Boogie Bunch' who could be the co-presenters since Nat was absent. In the same series, Pete was given a nickname, 'Boogie Pete'. It also features clips of children (at home, in schools or in front of bluescreen).

In earlier series, the same programme was shown throughout the week. In the later series, a slightly different programme was shown daily. The only variant being, the verses of the soundtrack are taught, and the chorus is only run through once.

The dance is taught segment by segment by the presenters. In earlier programmes, the two presenters took turns with every segment. The moves to every day's dance, as well as the theme of the soundtrack, are drawn from either nature or the world around us (such as "The Ocean Motion", featuring dance moves inspired by various sea creatures). Every time, the program culminates with a full performance of the soundtrack and dance, known as "The Big Video", in which the presenters call "Big Video Time".

In Series 1, one presenter would be on a green screen set of yellow and green polka dots, and the other presenter would go somewhere wherever fits the song, for example, Pete might go to a construction site for the Dig It song and Nat could go to a flower garden for the Gardening song. However, in Series 2, Pete would usually stand in front of a green screen to the place, rather than going there. The Boogie Bunch will too have a short dance tutorial and he would also stand in front of the typical green and yellow polka dot set, but in this season, they move into the opposite colours and that repeats.

In Series 1, Roni would wear a pink sleeveless jacket, and Hillier would wear a green t-shirt with yellow stripes & neck and a red wristband. In Series 2, Pete's outfit varies, between a red t-shirt with a yellow fire symbol, and a green t-shirt with a yellow firework symbol.

The name of the programme comes from the informal verb to dance (boogie) and the Beebies suffix of CBeebies. The program was advertised using a child dancing "Travolta style" to A Fifth of Beethoven by Walter Murphy.

The series made a comeback to CBeebies in 2020, with Oti Mabuse hosting. Subsequently, BBC cancelled the show in the following year.

== Episodes ==
Series 1

Presented by Nataylia Roni and Pete Hillier.

1. Dig It
2. Ocean Motion
3. The Kangaroo
4. Take It to the Checkout
5. Go Go Mango
6. Space Walking
7. Pirate Gang
8. Football Shimmy
9. Cup Cake
10. Shoe Hoedown
11. Turning Around
12. Gardening
13. Hey Monkey
14. Every Kind of Weather Song
15. Building
16. Barnyard Boogie
17. Little Dreamer
18. We Want to be Fit
19. Bug A Lug
20. Tick Tock Clock
21. Butterfly Fly
22. Dancing on the Sand
23. Chuffa Chuffa Chawoowoo
24. Penguin Bop
25. Double Decker
26. Teatime
27. Dream Cleaning Crew
28. Carousel
29. Going to the Park
30. Do the Duck

Series 2

Presented by Pete Hillier. This series features five programmes per theme, making 80 episodes altogether.

1. Rainbow Sky
2. Airport
3. Vegetable Jam
4. I Wish it Would Snow
5. Brave Prince
6. Roll Up, Roll Up
7. Do the Dino
8. Orchestra
9. Baby Boogie
10. Woof! Woof!
11. In the Swim
12. Viking Warrior
13. Tractor Stomp
14. I Want to Be...
15. Sporty Boogie
16. Waterhole

Series 3

Presented by Oti Mabuse titled as Oti's Boogie Beebies.

1. Zoom to the Moon Song
2. Get Dancing Song: Dancing by Kylie Minogue
3. Shine Like the Sun Song: Shine by Take That
4. Sea Creatures Song: 4 June 2020
5. Feeling Good Song: Can't Stop the Feeling! by Justin Timberlake 5 June 2020
6. Full Steam Ahead Song: 8 June 2020
7. All Things Red Song: Ruby by Kaiser Chiefs 9 June 2020
8. Sport Star Song: Eat My Goal by Collapsed Lung 10 June 2020
9. Favourite Place Song: Rather Be by Clean Bandit feat. Jess Glynne 11 June 2020
10. Jungle Song: 12 June 2020
11. Up, Down and Around Song: Keep On Movin' by Five 15 June 2020
12. Upside Down Song: Upside Down by Paloma Faith 16 June 2020
13. Musical Instrument Jam Song: 17 June 2020
14. Monsters Song: Monster Mash by Bobby Pickett & the Crypt-Kickers 18 June 2020
15. Fruit and Vegetables Song: I Really Like You by Carly Rae Jepsen 19 June 2020

== Home media ==
BBC Worldwide released several DVDs of the series in the United Kingdom.

Title	Episodes	Release date
Your Chance to Dance!	Dig It Ocean Motion; Go Go Mango; Space Walking; Turning Around; Gardening; Hey Monkey	4 July 2005
Get Ready to Boogie	Barnyard Boogie The Kangaroo; We Want to be Fit; Pirate Gang; Every Kind of Weather Song; Butterfly Fly; Dancing on the Sand	26 December 2005
Little Dreamer and Other Stories	Little Dreamer Take It to the Checkout; Building Boogaloo; Teatime; Cup Cake	26 March 2007
Move Your Feet to the Beat	Going to the Park Shoe Hoedown; Double Decker; Penguin Bop; Carousel; Chuffa Chuffa Chawoowoo; Do the Duck	25 August 2008
