= Bits and Bobs =

British-Scottish children's television series

- Also known as: Bits agus Bobs (Scots Gaelic)
- Genre: Children's television programme
- Created by: Brian Jameson
- Developed by: Mak Wilson; Grant Mason; Simon Spencer
- Voices of: Sally Preisig; Rebecca Nagan; Lynn Robertson Bruce
- Countries of origin: United Kingdom; Scotland
- Original language: English
- No. of seasons: 2
- No. of episodes: 124

Production
- Producer: Brian Jameson
- Running time: 15 Minutes
- Production company: BBC Scotland

Original release
- Network: CBeebies
- Release: 11 February 2002 – 4 June 2005

Bits and Bobs is a children's television programme which is produced and broadcast by the BBC. It was last repeated on CBeebies on 21 December 2012. The show is filmed at several notable Scottish attractions and locations.

Bits and Bobs is also an English slang for a collection of small items too numerous or varied to name individually. It originated from carpenters' tool kits containing parts for a drill, with bits used for making holes while bobs are routing or screwdriving drill attachments.

Recording for the first series took place in late 2001 and was initially scheduled to premiere in the summer of 2002.

== Characters ==
- Bits (voiced by Sally Preisig and Rebecca Nagan)
- Bobs (voiced by Lynn Robertson Bruce)
- Trug (N/A)

== Episodes ==
| Series | Episodes | Originally released | |
| Series | Episodes | First released | Last released |
|---|---|---|---|
| 1 | 53 | 11 February 2002 | 9 March 2004 |
| 2 | 71 | 2 April 2004 | 4 June 2005 |
