= Garth and Bev =

Irish-made television series for younger children

- Directed by: Andrew Kavanagh
- Starring: Daniel Culleton; Flo McSweeney; Mia Murphy
- Theme music composer: Tony Atkins
- Countries of origin: Ireland; Canada
- Original language: English

Production
- Production companies: Kaveleer Productions; Copernicus Studios

Original release
- Network: CBeebies (United Kingdom); RTÉ Two (Ireland); Toon-A-Vision (Nova Scotia)

Garth and Bev is an Irish television series for preschoolers produced by Kavaleer Productions and was broadcast on RTÉ Two and CBeebies. It was first broadcast on 11 January 2010.

== Plot ==
Garth and Bev is set in the Bronze Age and centres on the adventures of Garth and his little sister Bev. Garth and Bev are no ordinary children, though; they are also time travellers. With the help of their grandfather, a mystical druid with magical abilities, they travel through time and learn how nature has influenced modern day inventions.

== Themes ==
Garth & Bev is all about using creativity and problem solving, and these are things that Garth and Bev do in each episode. The show also has an emphasis on the wonderment of nature, suggesting that, more often than not, for every modern invention, nature already has an answer.

== Characters ==
Garth is eight and has always been a great artist, cave drawing from an early age. His other passion in inventing, as well as meeting inventors and learning from them. Bev is six, and very sharp for her age. She loves time travelling with Garth, and will often be the first to discover the solution to Grandfather Lír's challenge. Lír is Garth and Bev's grandfather. He is a wise druid with magical abilities. Lír sets his grandchildren challenges and treats them with an adventure through time if they get it right and discover something new.
