= Yoho Ahoy =

- Logo
- Created by: Mark Slater; Julian Roberts
- Written by: Stan Cullimore; Jonathan Evans; Mark Slater; Leslie Cowell; Wayne Jackman; Paul LeNoel; Shelly Wain; Jan Page; Mole Hill; Anthony Hatfield; Julian Roberts; Joss Cope; John Tackley; Simon Grover; Gregg Wheelan; Gary Winters; David Lloyd
- Directed by: Mole Hill
- Voices of: Joss Cope; Shelly Wain; Mole Hill; Mark Slater; Simi Mougne; Julian Roberts; Sarah Thornhill
- Opening theme: "Yoho Ahoy"
- Ending theme: "Yoho Ahoy" (Instrumental)
- Composer: John Tackley
- Country of origin: United Kingdom
- No. of series: 2
- No. of episodes: 59

Production
- Executive producer: Theresa Plummer-Andrews
- Producer: Julian Roberts
- Running time: 5 minutes per episode (approx.)
- Production companies: The Consortium of Gentlemen; BBC Worldwide

Original release
- Network: CBBC; CBeebies
- Release: 7 January 2000 – 20 August 2001

Yoho Ahoy is a 2000-2001 British animated children's television series about a gang of animated pirates, known as Yohos, who had lived on board their giant pirate ship, called The Rubber Duck. The title of the TV show derives from the fact that the only words the main characters say, depending on their feelings are "Yoho" and "Ahoy", that is just a language. The characters themselves are animated puppets. In Spring 2001, the show itself won the Banff Television Festival Rockie Award: Best Animation for "Yoho Ahoy: Buzz with Jones". The show was first broadcast on CBBC and later on CBeebies in the United Kingdom, while in Canada, the programme aired on Knowledge Network and on TVOKids.

== Characters ==
=== Main ===
- Bilge – The ship's dark blue male captain with a yellow stomach and dark blue body. He wants the ship to be clean and tidy at all times.
- Cutlass – The ship's yellow female quartermaster who wears an eyepatch and carries a pea-shooting blowgun.
- Swab – The ship's purple female bosun and Plunder’s sister. She wears a white hoop earring on each ear.
- Poop – The youngest of the crew, and the ship's yellow male sleepy cabin boy who wears a blue yellow-spotted nightcap.
- Jones – The ship's male green skull-like engineer who often comes up with creative ways to solve problems.
- Grog – The ship's male green chef who wears a green yellow-spotted hat. Because Grog has no hands, he instead uses hooks and other utensils to do his work.
- Booty – The ship's female beige pianist, and Flamingo's owner. She is quite posh compared to the other Yohos, but still very friendly and helpful.

=== Others ===
- Plunder – A purple female crewmate and Swab’s sister, who often pulls up interesting things from the sea with her net, and can be quite resourceful.
- Plank – A yellow male castaway rescued from the sea by Plunder and Poop, who joins the crew. He's a little rough, but means well.
- Crow – The ship's indigo male lookout, who lives in the crow's nest at the top of the ship. Given his humanoid appearance, he is likely a Yoho simply named Crow, rather than a real bird.
- Flamingo – A male flamingo who is Booty's pet. He sometimes causes mischief on board The Rubber Duck, often taking things from the Yohos without them noticing. Flamingo's one way of communicating is by squawking.
- Parrot – Bilge's green male parrot with a purple beak who can fly around the Rubber Duck unaided. Just like Bilge and the other Yohos, Parrot says the two following words: "Yoho" and "Ahoy".
- Cat – The male ginger ship's cat who often chases the pink and blue rats around whenever he sees them. Just like all real cats, Cat's way of communicating is by meowing.
- The Rats – Pink and blue rats on board the pirate ship who appear in the most surprising places, often causing trouble in the kitchen. With their squeaky communication, the rats, who are often followed around by Cat, cause nothing but trouble wherever they go.

== Voice Cast (UK) ==
- Mole Hill as Bilge and Crow
- Simi Mougne as Cutlass
- Sarah Thornhill as Booty
- Shelly Wain as Swab and Plunder
- Julian Roberts as Poop, Parrot and Cat
- Joss Cope as Grog, Plank and the Rats
- Mark Slater as Jones and Flamingo

== Episodes ==
=== Series 1 (2000) ===
No.	Title	Original release date
1	"Flag with Bilge"	7 January 2000
Jones and Swab try to pull a flag up onto the top of the ship's mast, but matters aren't helped when Poop sneezes.
2	"Bullseye with Cutlass"	14 January 2000
Cutlass shows off her pea-shooting skills, but Swab doesn't consider this to be quite such a good idea.
3	"Heave with Booty"	21 January 2000
Booty makes a discovery whilst the crew of The Rubber Duck play hide and seek.
4	"Blow with Poop"	28 January 2000
Poop doesn't know how to whistle, so Grog, Cutlass and Swab help him.
5	"Pants with Cutlass"	10 March 2000
The crew get into trouble involving Bilge’s trousers.
6	"Up with Jones"	17 March 2000
To finish their painting job, Grog and Poop use Jones’s lift and brush, but leaving Jones at risk of missing out on the reward.
7	"Fish with Grog"	24 March 2000
Grog gives Cutlass a helping hand on how to catch a fish.
8	"Mops with Poop"	31 March 2000
Poop gets in trouble with Bilge after failing to clean up the deck.
9	"Lullaby with Booty"	5 April 2000
Booty, the pianist, cannot sleep, because of the singing done by Grog, Swab and Jones.
10	"Bone with Plunder"	26 April 2000
Plunder, Swab and Poop enjoy a spot of music dancing on the ship, which wakes up Bilge!
TBA	"Fiddle with Swab"	2000
During a music lesson, Swab experiments with new music on her fiddle.
TBA	"Pancake with Poop"	2000
Poop wants to help Grog make Pancakes, but he’s supposed to help Swap with the laundry.
TBA	"Puff with Jones"	2000
Jones invents a way to fill the sails with air.
TBA	"Jug with Swab"	2000
Swab accidentally breaks Bilge’s favourite jug.
TBA	"Cheese with Grog"	2000
The crew want cheese with holes for lunch. But the only cheese in the kitchen has no holes.
TBA	"Sail with Jones"	2000
The crew have trouble getting the ship’s sail up on a windy day. But Jones finds another use for it.
TBA	"Lost with Swab"	2000
Swab loses one of her earrings and worries about if she will ever have it again.
TBA	"Feast with Rats"	2000
The rats seize their chance for a midnight feast.
TBA	"Clonk with Flamingo"	2000
Flamingo finds a way to make Booty’s music more exciting.
TBA	"Art with Crow"	2000
Crow wants to draw a picture of Cat.
TBA	"Bell with Parrot"	2000
Parrot is hungry, so he rings the bell, a lot of times.
TBA	"Bowl with Bilge"	2000
While Bilge is distracted, Swab, Grog and Jones play a secret game of Bowls.
TBA	"Drill with Parrot"	2000
Bilge tries to teach Cutlass and Swab a marching drill.
TBA	"Flotsam with Plunder"	2000
Flamingo gets upset when Booty throws his picture overboard.

=== Series 2 (2001) ===
No.	Title	Original release date
1	"Boing with Jones"	14 September 2000
Jones finds a clever way of rescuing a lost ball.
TBA	"Chairs with Grog"	2000
The gang have a game of Musical Chairs on the sundeck, which Grog wins.
TBA	"Pop with Swab"	2000
Swab is annoyed at Cutlass for popping balloons on the deck.
TBA	"Snore with Poop"	2000
Poop's sleeping on the job keeps everyone else awake!
TBA	"Freeze with Bilge"	2000
The crew play a game of statues.
TBA	"Buzz with Jones"	2000
Jones deals with a buzzing bee on the ship.
TBA	"Jig with Flamingo"	2000
Cutlass and Swab’s marbles game gets Flamingo dancing.
TBA	"Paint with Booty"	2000
TBA	"Sneeze with Rats"	2000
TBA	"Pest with Plank"	2000
TBA	"Peck with Flamingo"	2000
TBA	"Bed with Cat"	13 December 2000
It is all Cat's fault for keeping Poop and Swab awake.
TBA	"Beat with Cat"	2000
TBA	"Pass with Jones"	2000
TBA	"Snooze with Cat"	2000
TBA	"Hide with Crow"	2000
TBA	"Cake with Poop"	2000

== UK VHS tape releases ==
VHS Tape title	Release date	Episodes
Yoho Ahoy: Welcome Aboard (BBCV 6919)	2 October 2000	"Mops with Poop"; "Fish with Grog"; "Flag with Bilge"; "Boing with Jones"; "Blow with Poop"; "Fiddle with Swab"; "Bullseye with Cutlass"; "Chairs with Grog"; "Pop with Swab"; "Lullaby with Booty"

== 2000 Video Game ==
In 2000, BBC Multimedia developed a video game based on the series. The game consists of a collection of 7 mini-games.
