= List of Peppa Pig episodes =

Peppa Pig is a British preschool animated television series produced by Astley Baker Davies. The show features the eponymous pig along with her family and friends. Each episode is approximately five minutes long (with the exception of a 10-minute special and two 15-minute specials). There have been eight seasons as of 2023. The eighth season began airing on 4 September 2023. Peppa Pig has been broadcast in over 180 countries. As of 2 April 2026, 459 episodes of Peppa Pig have aired.

== Series overview ==
Series	Episodes	Originally released	
Series	Episodes	First released	Last released
1	52	31 May 2004	30 November 2004
2	52	4 September 2006	20 June 2007
Special	2	25 December 2007	
3	52	4 May 2009	17 December 2010
4	52	23 May 2011	28 December 2012
Specials	3	14 February 2015	6 March 2016
5	52	24 October 2016	21 September 2018
Film		7 April 2017	
6	52	5 February 2019	7 October 2020
7	65	5 March 2021	23 February 2023
8	52	4 September 2023	24 April 2025
9	TBA	30 May 2025	TBA

== Episodes ==
The following tables list with details the episodes for the children's television programme Peppa Pig, which were first broadcast in the UK on Channel 5 and Nick Jr., starting in 2004. Each episode is approximately five minutes long, except for three specials: a 10-minute one ("Peppa's Christmas") and two 15-minute ones ("The Golden Boots" and "Around the World with Peppa"). This list also includes upcoming episodes.

The "DVD reference" column in the episode lists is used to relate an episode to the DVD volume(s) on which it can be found (e.g. episode 10 in series 1 "Gardening" has a DVD reference of 1.09, which indicates that the episode is track 9 on primary DVD volume 1). A prefix of "NP" (e.g. NP1.01) indicates the episode is the first episode on "Non-Primary" DVD 1.

=== Series 1 (2004) ===
No. overall	No. in series	Title	Directed by	Written by	Original channel	Original release date	DVD reference
1	1	"Muddy Puddles"	Mark Baker & Neville Astley	Neville Astley & Mark Baker	Channel 5	31 May 2004	1.01, NP1.01
Peppa and George get very muddy after playing their favourite game - Muddy Puddles.
2	2	"Mr Dinosaur Is Lost"	Mark Baker & Neville Astley	Mark Baker & Neville Astley	Channel 5	1 June 2004	1.02
George is distraught as he has lost his favourite toy, Mr. Dinosaur. The rest of the family look for it.
3	3	"Best Friend"	Mark Baker & Neville Astley	Alison Snowden	Channel 5	2 June 2004	1.04
George feels left out when Peppa's best friend Suzy Sheep comes to play. They soon notice they need a patient for their pretend doctor game.
4	4	"Polly Parrot"	Mark Baker & Neville Astley	Neville Astley & Mark Baker	Channel 5	3 June 2004	1.03
Peppa and George meet their Granny and Grandpa's new pet: a green parrot called Polly.
5	5	"Hide and Seek"	Mark Baker & Neville Astley	Mark Baker & Neville Astley	Channel 5	4 June 2004	1.05
Peppa complains that George is too easy to find in hide and seek.
6	6	"The Playgroup"	Mark Baker & Neville Astley	Neville Astley & Mark Baker	Channel 5	6 June 2004	1.06
Today is George's first day at playgroup, although Peppa is hesitant at first because of his age. He soon gets introduced to everybody and shows his interest in dinosaurs.
7	7	"Mummy Pig at Work"	Mark Baker & Neville Astley	Mark Baker & Neville Astley	Channel 5	7 June 2004	1.07
Peppa breaks Mummy Pig's computer while she is working.
8	8	"Piggy in the Middle"	Mark Baker & Neville Astley	Neville Astley & Mark Baker	Channel 5	8 June 2004	4.01
Peppa keeps teasing George with their ball, because he cannot catch it.
9	9	"Daddy Loses His Glasses"	Mark Baker & Neville Astley	Mark Baker & Neville Astley	Channel 5	9 June 2004	2.03
Daddy Pig has lost his glasses, so Peppa and George look for them.
10	10	"Gardening"	Mark Baker & Neville Astley	Neville Astley & Mark Baker	Channel 5	10 June 2004	1.09
Peppa and George look in Granny and Grandpa Pig's garden.
11	11	"Hiccups"	Mark Baker & Neville Astley	Mark Baker & Neville Astley	Channel 5	11 June 2004	2.04
George drinks his juice too quickly and gets hiccups. Peppa attempts to cure them.
12	12	"Bicycles"	Mark Baker & Neville Astley	Sarah Ann Kennedy	Channel 5	13 June 2004	1.10
Peppa notices her bike is quite "babyish" after teasing George about it.
13	13	"Secrets"	Mark Baker & Neville Astley	Ange Palethorpe	Channel 5	14 June 2004	3.09
Peppa is given a box, which she has to keep a secret.
14	14	"Flying a Kite"	Mark Baker & Neville Astley	Mark Baker & Neville Astley	Channel 5	15 June 2004	2.01
The family fly a kite on a windy day, but it soon gets stuck in a tree.
15	15	"Picnic"	Mark Baker & Neville Astley	Mark Baker & Neville Astley	Channel 5	16 June 2004	2.05
The family have a picnic.
16	16	"Musical Instruments"	Mark Baker & Neville Astley	Mark Baker & Neville Astley	Channel 5	17 June 2004	2.09
Mummy and Daddy Pig find some musical instruments, and decide to let Peppa and George play around with them.
17	17	"Frogs and Worms and Butterflies"	Mark Baker & Neville Astley	Neville Astley & Mark Baker	Channel 5	18 June 2004	5.04
Peppa and George are fascinated by all the creatures in Granny and Grandpa's garden.
18	18	"Dressing Up"	Mark Baker & Neville Astley	Neville Astley & Mark Baker	Channel 5	20 June 2004	2.07
Peppa and George dress up as Mummy and Daddy Pig, making them laugh.
19	19	"New Shoes"	Mark Baker & Neville Astley	Neville Astley & Mark Baker	Channel 5	21 June 2004	3.01
Peppa loves her new red shoes so much she doesn't want to take them off.
20	20	"The School Fete"	Mark Baker & Neville Astley	Neville Astley & Mark Baker	Channel 5	22 June 2004	2.08
The family goes to the school fête.
21	21	"Mummy Pig's Birthday"	Mark Baker & Neville Astley	Neville Astley & Mark Baker	Channel 5	23 June 2004	2.06, 17.08
Peppa, George and Daddy Pig prepare a birthday surprise for Mummy Pig.
22	22	"The Tooth Fairy"	Mark Baker & Neville Astley	Neville Astley & Mark Baker	Channel 5	24 June 2004	3.03
Peppa loses a tooth, this means a visit from the Tooth Fairy.
23	23	"The New Car"	Mark Baker & Neville Astley	Neville Astley & Mark Baker	Channel 5	25 June 2004	1.11
The family borrow a car when their old one breaks down.
24	24	"Treasure Hunt"	Mark Baker & Neville Astley	Mark Baker & Neville Astley	Channel 5	27 June 2004	3.04, 17.06
Granny and Grandpa Pig prepare a treasure hunt for Peppa and George.
25	25	"Not Very Well"	Mark Baker & Neville Astley	Mark Baker & Neville Astley	Channel 5	28 June 2004	3.05
Peppa is sick and has red spots all over her face.
26	26	"Snow"	Mark Baker & Neville Astley	Mark Baker & Neville Astley	Channel 5	29 June 2004	1.12, 20.02
Peppa and George have fun in the snow, throwing snowballs and making a snowman.
27	27	"Windy Castle"	Mark Baker & Neville Astley	Mark Baker & Neville Astley	Channel 5	30 June 2004	3.06
The family go to Windy Castle and see Granny and Grandpa Pig's house. On the way, they play the I spy game.
28	28	"My Cousin Chloé"	Mark Baker & Neville Astley	Mark Baker & Neville Astley	Channel 5	1 July 2004	2.02, NP1.10
Peppa finds the "grown-up" games that Chloe Pig knows are quite difficult.
29	29	"Pancakes"	Mark Baker & Neville Astley	Mark Baker & Neville Astley	Channel 5	2 July 2004	3.07
The family have pancakes for breakfast. Daddy Pig flips his all the way to the kitchen ceiling and it gets stuck.
30	30	"Babysitting"	Mark Baker & Neville Astley	Mark Baker & Neville Astley	Channel 5	4 July 2004	2.10
Granny and Grandpa Pig look after Peppa and George while Mummy and Daddy Pig go out for the night.
31	31	"Ballet Lesson"	Mark Baker & Neville Astley	Mark Baker & Neville Astley	Channel 5	5 July 2004	3.02
Peppa goes to her first ballet lesson.
32	32	"Thunderstorm"	Mark Baker & Neville Astley	Mark Baker & Neville Astley	Channel 5	6 July 2004	3.10
Peppa and George learn about thunderstorms.
33	33	"Cleaning the Car"	Mark Baker & Neville Astley	Neville Astley & Mark Baker	Channel 5	7 July 2004	5.07
The family want to go out for a drive, but the car is filthy.
34	34	"Lunch"	Mark Baker & Neville Astley	Mark Baker & Neville Astley	Channel 5	8 July 2004	4.05
On a trip to Granny and Grandpa Pig's house, George is hesitant and picky to eat vegetables.
35	35	"Camping"	Mark Baker & Neville Astley	Neville Astley & Mark Baker	Channel 5	9 July 2004	1.08
Daddy Pig is too big to get inside the tent, so he sleeps outside, but not for long.
36	36	"The Sleepy Princess"	Mark Baker & Neville Astley	Mark Baker & Neville Astley	Channel 5	28 October 2004	4.06, 17.10
Mummy and Daddy Pig make up a story for Peppa and George to go to sleep.
37	37	"The Tree House"	Mark Baker & Neville Astley	Mark Baker & Neville Astley	Channel 5	29 October 2004	4.07
Grandpa Pig shows Peppa and George the new tree house he built for them.
38	38	"Fancy Dress Party"	Mark Baker & Neville Astley	Neville Astley & Mark Baker	Channel 5	31 October 2004	4.02, 17.07
Peppa holds a fancy dress party at her house, but she notices it is hard to pick the best costume.
39	39	"The Museum"	Mark Baker & Neville Astley	Neville Astley & Mark Baker	Channel 5	1 November 2004	3.08
The family go to the museum.
40	40	"Very Hot Day"	Mark Baker & Neville Astley	Mark Baker & Neville Astley	Channel 5	2 November 2004	4.03
The family find ways to stay cool on a hot day after the muddy puddles dry up.
41	41	"Chloé's Puppet Show"	Mark Baker & Neville Astley	Mark Baker & Neville Astley	Channel 5	3 November 2004	4.10
Peppa and George make puppets for Chloe Pig's new puppet theatre, and put on a play about Uncle Pig sleeping all the time.
42	42	"Daddy Gets Fit"	Mark Baker & Neville Astley	Neville Astley & Mark Baker	Channel 5	4 November 2004	4.08
Peppa accuses Daddy Pig of being fat, so she makes him get active.
43	43	"Tidying Up"	Mark Baker & Neville Astley	Neville Astley & Mark Baker	Channel 5	5 November 2004	5.03
Peppa and George's room is messy, so the family tidy the place up.
44	44	"The Playground"	Mark Baker & Neville Astley	Neville Astley & Mark Baker	Channel 5	7 November 2004	5.02
George is quite scared of going on most of the playground equipment.
45	45	"Daddy Puts up a Picture"	Mark Baker & Neville Astley	Neville Astley & Mark Baker	Channel 5	8 November 2004	5.05
Daddy Pig makes a simple job like putting up a picture more difficult than it should be.
46	46	"At the Beach"	Mark Baker & Neville Astley	Mark Baker & Neville Astley	Channel 5	9 November 2004	5.06, NP2.03
The family go out to the beach.
47	47	"Mister Skinnylegs"	Mark Baker & Neville Astley	Alison Snowden	Channel 5	10 November 2004	4.04
George finds a spider in the bathroom to play with for the dolls' house and made Peppa scared. Note: This episode was banned from airing in Australia because it said that "spiders were not to be feared".
48	48	"Grandpa Pig's Boat"	Mark Baker & Neville Astley	Mark Baker & Neville Astley	Channel 5	11 November 2004	5.08
Peppa and George go on a day trip with Grandpa Pig on his boat.
49	49	"Shopping"	Mark Baker & Neville Astley	Sarah Ann Kennedy	Channel 5	12 November 2004	4.09
The family go out shopping to the supermarket.
50	50	"My Birthday Party"	Mark Baker & Neville Astley	Mark Baker & Neville Astley	Channel 5	28 November 2004	5.01, 17.03
It's Peppa's birthday and she wakes up early to make sure her special day lasts.
51	51	"Daddy's Movie Camera"	Mark Baker & Neville Astley	Mark Baker & Neville Astley	Channel 5	29 November 2004	5.09
Peppa teaches Daddy Pig how to use his new movie camera.
52	52	"School Play"	Mark Baker & Neville Astley	Mark Baker & Neville Astley	Channel 5	30 November 2004	5.10, 17.09
The playgroup do a play of "The Little Red Riding Hood". Pedro Pony feels a bit shy being in it. Note: This is the final episode to feature Lily Snowden-Fine as Peppa Pig. Snowden-Fine left the show so that she could move to Toronto, Canada, with Alison Snowden and David Fine.

=== Series 2 (2006–2007) ===
No. overall	No. in series	Title	Directed by	Written by	Original channel	Original release date	DVD reference
53	1	"Bubbles"	Mark Baker & Neville Astley	Neville Astley & Mark Baker	Channel 5	4 September 2006	6.01, NP1.06
When they run out of bubble mixture, Daddy Pig shows Peppa and George a way to make big bubbles. Note: This is the first episode to feature Cecily Bloom as Peppa Pig.
54	2	"Emily Elephant"	Mark Baker & Neville Astley	Mark Baker & Neville Astley	Channel 5	5 September 2006	6.03
Emily Elephant is new to playgroup and is a bit shy. The other pupils make her feel welcome.
55	3	"Polly's Holiday"	Mark Baker & Neville Astley	Alison Snowden	Channel 5	6 September 2006	6.04, NP2.04
Polly Parrot is at Peppa's house while Granny and Grandpa Pig are on holiday.
56	4	"Teddy's Day Out"	Mark Baker & Neville Astley	Mark Baker & Neville Astley	Channel 5	7 September 2006	6.02
Peppa's family have a picnic with Zoë Zebra, but Peppa leaves her favourite toy, teddy, behind on the way back.
57	5	"Mysteries"	Mark Baker & Neville Astley	Mark Baker & Neville Astley	Channel 5	8 September 2006	6.06
Peppa and George are inspired by their favourite TV show, so Mummy and Daddy Pig give them a mystery to solve.
58	6	"George's Friend"	Mark Baker & Neville Astley	Mark Baker & Neville Astley	Channel 5	11 September 2006	6.05
George and Richard Rabbit find it difficult to get along when they meet for the first time.
59	7	"Mr. Scarecrow"	Mark Baker & Neville Astley	Neville Astley & Mark Baker	Channel 5	12 September 2006	6.10
Grandpa Pig's seeds keep getting eaten by birds, so he makes a scarecrow with the help of Peppa and George.
60	8	"Windy Autumn Day"	Mark Baker & Neville Astley	Mark Baker & Neville Astley	Channel 5	13 September 2006	6.08, 20.04
On a windy autumn day, the family plan to go for a walk.
61	9	"The Time Capsule"	Mark Baker & Neville Astley	Neville Astley & Mark Baker	Channel 5	14 September 2006	6.09
The playgroup make a time capsule and to be buried in the grass for the future.
62	10	"Rock Pools"	Mark Baker & Neville Astley	Neville Astley & Mark Baker	Channel 5	15 September 2006	6.07
Peppa and George go to a rocky beach with Granny and Grandpa Pig and find various rock pools and sea creatures.
63	11	"Recycling"	Mark Baker & Neville Astley	Neville Astley & Mark Baker	Channel 5	18 September 2006	6.12
The family are sorting out the recycling things and take them to a recycling centre.
64	12	"The Boat Pond"	Mark Baker & Neville Astley	Mark Baker & Neville Astley	Channel 5	19 September 2006	6.11
Peppa and George play with their toy boats at the pond, and soon, everyone else arrives with their own boats, except for Rebecca Rabbit.
65	13	"Traffic Jam"	Mark Baker & Neville Astley	Mark Baker & Neville Astley	Channel 5	20 September 2006	10.07
The family get stuck in a traffic jam while on the way to Granny and Grandpa Pig's house for lunch, so Granny and Grandpa Pig move their picnic by the road.
66	14	"Bedtime"	Mark Baker & Neville Astley	Mark Baker & Neville Astley	Channel 5	21 September 2006	9.10
Peppa and George have one more chance at jumping in muddy puddles before going to bed. Mummy and Daddy Pig then realise how difficult it is for them to prepare themselves to go to sleep!
67	15	"Sports Day"	Mark Baker & Neville Astley	Neville Astley & Mark Baker	Channel 5	25 December 2006	9.04
The playgroup children take part in Sports Day, but it's hard to be the champion that Peppa expects.
68	16	"The Eye Test"	Mark Baker & Neville Astley	Neville Astley & Mark Baker	Channel 5	26 December 2006	9.05
When Pedro Pony loses his glasses, Peppa gets fascinated by them, so she visits Dr. Pony the optician and gets an eye test.
69	17	"Granddad Dog's Garage"	Mark Baker & Neville Astley	Mark Baker & Neville Astley	Channel 5	27 December 2006	9.06
Whenever there's a problem with a car, Grandad Dog's Garage is only a short stop away, but what happens when he has trouble with a new computerised car wash?
70	18	"Foggy Day"	Mark Baker & Neville Astley	Neville Astley & Mark Baker	Channel 5	28 December 2006	9.07
The family want to go to the playground, but cannot see anything because of the fog.
71	19	"Jumble Sale"	Mark Baker & Neville Astley	Neville Astley & Mark Baker	Channel 5	29 December 2006	9.08
Peppa and her playgroup friends are selling things to the jumble sale to raise money for the broken school roof.
72	20	"Swimming"	Mark Baker & Neville Astley	Chris Parker	Channel 5	1 January 2007	9.09
The family are going swimming, but George is scared to go into the pool, then he has fun in the pool with Richard Rabbit.
73	21	"Tiny Creatures"	Mark Baker & Neville Astley	Neville Astley & Mark Baker	Channel 5	2 January 2007	9.02
Peppa and her friends learn about small creatures in Grandpa Pig's garden.
74	22	"Daddy Pig's Office"	Mark Baker & Neville Astley	Mark Baker & Neville Astley	Channel 5	3 January 2007	9.03
Daddy Pig takes Peppa and George to visit his office.
75	23	"Pirate Island"	Mark Baker & Neville Astley	Mark Baker & Neville Astley	Channel 5	4 January 2007	7.02
Granny and Grandpa Pig take Peppa, George and her friends to a small island on Grandpa's Pig's boat.
76	24	"George Catches a Cold"	Mark Baker & Neville Astley	Mark Baker & Neville Astley	Channel 5	5 January 2007	8.02
On a rainy day, George takes his rain hat off and ends up catching a cold, so he has to stay in bed for a bit.
77	25	"The Balloon Ride"	Mark Baker & Neville Astley	Neville Astley & Mark Baker	Channel 5	8 January 2007	8.01
Peppa and her family rides on Miss Rabbit's hot air balloon, but Peppa loses Teddy off the basket.
78	26	"George's Birthday"	Mark Baker & Neville Astley	Mark Baker & Neville Astley	Channel 5	9 January 2007	8.10
The family celebrate George's dinosaur-themed birthday at the museum.
79	27	"The Long Grass"	Mark Baker & Neville Astley	Neville Astley & Mark Baker	Channel 5	5 March 2007	7.05
Peppa and George lose their ball in the long grass.
80	28	"Zoë Zebra the Postman's Daughter"	Mark Baker & Neville Astley	Mark Baker & Neville Astley	Channel 5	6 March 2007	7.07
Peppa writes a birthday card to Zoë Zebra for her birthday.
81	29	"Painting"	Mark Baker & Neville Astley	Chris Parker	Channel 5	7 March 2007	8.05
Peppa, George and Daddy Pig are painting a tree, but a bunch of ducks ruin it.
82	30	"Cuckoo Clock"	Mark Baker & Neville Astley	Chris Parker	Channel 5	8 March 2007	7.03
An unlucky George keeps missing the family's old cuckoo clock going off.
83	31	"The Baby Piggy"	Mark Baker & Neville Astley	Mark Baker & Neville Astley	Channel 5	9 March 2007	8.08
The family meet Baby Alexander Pig for the first time. Peppa finds out that taking care of Alexander is a lot harder than she expected.
84	32	"Grandpa's Little Train"	Mark Baker & Neville Astley	Mark Baker & Neville Astley	Channel 5	12 March 2007	8.04
Peppa and George ride on Grandpa's little train, and Miss Rabbit's bus gets stuck on the mud.
85	33	"The Cycle Ride"	Mark Baker & Neville Astley	Neville Astley & Mark Baker	Channel 5	13 March 2007	8.09
The family goes for a cycle ride meeting their friends for a race downhill.
86	34	"Ice Skating"	Mark Baker & Neville Astley	Neville Astley & Mark Baker	Channel 5	14 March 2007	8.06, 20.05
Peppa finds ice skating too difficult.
87	35	"The Dentist"	Mark Baker & Neville Astley	Chris Parker	Channel 5	15 March 2007	7.06
Peppa and George visit Dr. Elephant the dentist.
88	36	"Dens"	Mark Baker & Neville Astley	Chris Parker	Channel 5	16 March 2007	8.07
When Peppa decides only girls can enter the treehouse, Grandpa Pig makes the boys their own den.
89	37	"Pretend Friend"	Mark Baker & Neville Astley	Chris Parker	Channel 5	19 March 2007	7.04
Suzy makes up a friend named Leo Lion.
90	38	"School Bus Trip"	Mark Baker & Neville Astley	Mark Baker & Neville Astley	Channel 5	20 March 2007	7.10
The playgroup children go for a bus ride to the mountains.
91	39	"Rebecca Rabbit"	Mark Baker & Neville Astley	Neville Astley & Mark Baker	Channel 5	21 March 2007	8.03
Peppa and George learn that Rebecca Rabbit's house is a whole lot different from theirs.
92	40	"Nature Trail"	Mark Baker & Neville Astley	Neville Astley & Mark Baker	Channel 5	22 March 2007	7.08
The family go on a nature trail, but end up getting lost due to a rain advisory.
93	41	"Pen Pal"	Mark Baker & Neville Astley	Chris Parker	Channel 5	5 June 2007	7.09
Peppa is excited to be chosen the pen pal of a French donkey named Delphine.
94	42	"Granny and Grandpa's Attic"	Mark Baker & Neville Astley	Neville Astley & Mark Baker	Channel 5	6 June 2007	7.11
Peppa and George try to get rid of things from Granny and Grandpa Pig's attic.
95	43	"The Quarrel"	Mark Baker & Neville Astley	Mark Baker & Neville Astley	Channel 5	7 June 2007	10.04
Enraged, Peppa and Suzy fall out over a card game, and decide they are not friends anymore.
96	44	"The Toy Cupboard"	Mark Baker & Neville Astley	Neville Astley & Mark Baker	Channel 5	8 June 2007	10.03
Peppa & George's toy basket is too small, so Mummy Pig orders a new toy cupboard.
97	45	"School Camp"	Mark Baker & Neville Astley	Chris Parker	Channel 5	11 June 2007	10.02
Madame Gazelle takes the children on their first overnight camping trip in the forest.
98	46	"Captain Daddy Pig"	Mark Baker & Neville Astley	Mark Baker & Neville Astley	Channel 5	12 June 2007	10.05
The family use Grandpa Pig's boat for the day.
99	47	"The Powercut"	Mark Baker & Neville Astley	Neville Astley & Mark Baker	Channel 5	13 June 2007	10.06
When the electricity goes out, Peppa makes a pretend television out of cardboard.
100	48	"Bouncy Ball"	Mark Baker & Neville Astley	Neville Astley & Mark Baker	Channel 5	14 June 2007	10.08
George wants to play tennis with Peppa and Suzy, but as only two people can play at a time, he feels left out after being made a ball boy. When the others arrive, Daddy Pig shows them all how to play football.
101	49	"Stars"	Mark Baker & Neville Astley	Chris Parker	Channel 5	15 June 2007	10.01
Peppa's family goes to Granny and Grandpa's house at night and see the stars.
102	50	"Daddy Pig's Birthday"	Mark Baker & Neville Astley	Neville Astley & Mark Baker	Channel 5	18 June 2007	10.09, NP1.07
Peppa, George and Mummy Pig are making a chocolate cake for Daddy Pig's birthday.
103	51	"Sleepover"	Mark Baker & Neville Astley	Chris Parker	Channel 5	19 June 2007	10.10
Peppa and her friends are having a sleepover at Zoë Zebra's house.
104	52	"Cold Winter Day"	Mark Baker & Neville Astley	Mark Baker & Neville Astley	Channel 5	20 June 2007	9.01, 20.06
Peppa's friends are riding down the snowy hill with their sleighs. And Peppa and George are riding on Daddy Pig as a sleigh down the hill too!

=== Christmas special (2007) ===
No. overall	No. in series	Title	Directed by	Written by	Original channel	Original release date	DVD reference
105	53+54	"Peppa's Christmas"	Mark Baker & Neville Astley	Mark Baker & Neville Astley	Channel 5	25 December 2007	7.01, 9.11, 20.03
Peppa hopes everybody gets all the presents they want for Christmas and hopes to see Santa. Note: This is the first episode to feature Harley Bird as Peppa Pig. However, there is also a version of the special voiced by Cecily Bloom.

=== Series 3 (2009–2010) ===
No. overall	No. in series	Title	Directed by	Written by	Original channel	Original release date	DVD reference
106	1	"Work and Play"	Neville Astley & Mark Baker	Neville Astley, Mark Baker and Phil Hall	Channel 5	4 May 2009	11.02
Peppa and Suzy run a pretend shop at Playgroup, but they find it harder to run than they think!
107	2	"The Rainbow"	Neville Astley & Mark Baker	Neville Astley, Mark Baker and Phil Hall	Channel 5	5 May 2009	11.03, NP1.09
Peppa's family see a rainbow on a day out, but when they get to the end of the rainbow, it disappears.
108	3	"Pedro's Cough"	Neville Astley & Mark Baker	Neville Astley, Mark Baker and Phil Hall	Channel 5	6 May 2009	11.04
During playgroup, Pedro gets a contagious cough, which then soon spreads to the other pupils.
109	4	"The Library"	Neville Astley & Mark Baker	Neville Astley, Mark Baker and Phil Hall	Channel 5	7 May 2009	11.05
Peppa's family visit the library, but Daddy Pig's library book is overdue for ten years.
110	5	"The Camper Van"	Neville Astley & Mark Baker	Neville Astley, Mark Baker and Phil Hall	Channel 5	8 May 2009	11.06
Peppa's family go on holiday in a camper van, and find out how much fun it is.
111	6	"Camping Holiday"	Neville Astley & Mark Baker	Neville Astley, Mark Baker and Phil Hall	Channel 5	11 May 2009	11.07
Peppa's family go and visit Duck Land on their holiday, and find out that their camper van can do something special on their way home!
112	7	"Compost"	Neville Astley & Mark Baker	Neville Astley, Mark Baker and Phil Hall	Channel 5	12 May 2009	11.08
Peppa and George learn about compost while taking vegetable scraps to Grandpa Pig's garden.
113	8	"Richard Rabbit Comes to Play"	Neville Astley & Mark Baker	Neville Astley, Mark Baker and Phil Hall	Channel 5	13 May 2009	11.09
Suzy Sheep and Richard Rabbit come to play with Peppa and George. The boys and girls have problems on wanting to play the same games.
114	9	"Fun Run"	Neville Astley & Mark Baker	Neville Astley, Mark Baker and Phil Hall	Channel 5	14 May 2009	11.10
Daddy Pig agrees to do a fun run to raise money for a new playgroup roof.
115	10	"Washing"	Neville Astley & Mark Baker	Neville Astley, Mark Baker and Phil Hall	Channel 5	15 May 2009	12.02
Peppa, George and Mummy Pig accidentally turn Daddy Pig's white football shirt pink as Peppa's red dress gets washed inside.
116	11	"Polly's Boat Trip"	Neville Astley & Mark Baker	Neville Astley, Mark Baker and Phil Hall	Channel 5	18 May 2009	12.03
Polly Parrot goes on Grandpa Pig's boat with Grandpa Pig, Peppa and George, only to get capsized on a sand hill.
117	12	"Delphine Donkey"	Neville Astley & Mark Baker	Neville Astley, Mark Baker and Phil Hall	Channel 5	19 May 2009	12.04
Delphine Donkey revisits Peppa's house and shadows at playgroup, learning a little English along the way.
118	13	"The Fire Engine"	Neville Astley & Mark Baker	Neville Astley, Mark Baker and Phil Hall	Channel 5	20 May 2009	12.01, NP1.08
Whilst the daddies are having a BBQ, Peppa, George and Mummy Pig visit the fire station.
119	14	"Princess Peppa"	Neville Astley & Mark Baker	Neville Astley, Mark Baker and Phil Hall	Channel 5	2 November 2009	11.01, 17.02
When a dinner party mishap accidentally wakes Peppa and George, they make up a story which Peppa is the best when making it.
120	15	"Teddy Playgroup"	Neville Astley & Mark Baker	Neville Astley, Mark Baker and Phil Hall	Channel 5	3 November 2009	12.09
Peppa borrows the playgroup's mascot for the weekend, but is unsure if he'll have a good time.
121	16	"Danny's Pirate Party"	Neville Astley & Mark Baker	Neville Astley, Mark Baker and Phil Hall	Channel 5	4 November 2009	12.07, 17.05
For Danny Dog's pirate-themed Birthday, Grandpa Pig holds a treasure hunt at his house.
122	17	"Mr. Potato Comes to Town"	Neville Astley & Mark Baker	Neville Astley, Mark Baker and Phil Hall	Channel 5	5 November 2009	13.03
Mr. Potato has arrived to open up a new gym.
123	18	"The Train Ride"	Neville Astley & Mark Baker	Neville Astley, Mark Baker and Phil Hall	Channel 5	6 November 2009	12.08
The playgroup children are excited to go on a train trip in which Pedro constantly loses his ticket.
124	19	"Granny Pig's Chickens"	Neville Astley & Mark Baker	Neville Astley, Mark Baker and Phil Hall	Channel 5	9 November 2009	13.04
Peppa and George meet Granny Pig's chickens after they eat Grandpa Pig's lettuces.
125	20	"Talent Day"	Neville Astley & Mark Baker	Neville Astley, Mark Baker and Phil Hall	Channel 5	10 November 2009	13.05, 17.04
Peppa tries to find something for talent day.
126	21	"A Trip To the Moon"	Neville Astley & Mark Baker	Neville Astley, Mark Baker and Phil Hall	Channel 5	11 November 2009	12.10
Peppa's family tag along with Emily's clever brother, Edmond Elephant, to the Museum, but Peppa is worried that they are really going to the moon.
127	22	"Grandpa at the Playground"	Neville Astley & Mark Baker	Neville Astley, Mark Baker and Phil Hall	Channel 5	12 November 2009	12.06
Grandpa Pig finds it difficult to understand the rules of the playground.
128	23	"Goldie the Fish"	Neville Astley & Mark Baker	Neville Astley, Mark Baker and Phil Hall	Channel 5	13 November 2009	13.06
When Goldie is sad, Peppa, George and Mummy Pig take Goldie on the bus ride to Dr. Hamster the vet.
129	24	"Funfair"	Neville Astley & Mark Baker	Neville Astley, Mark Baker and Phil Hall	Channel 5	16 November 2009	13.07
Peppa's family go to the funfair. Mummy Pig is desperate to win all games there.
130	25	"Numbers"	Neville Astley & Mark Baker	Neville Astley, Mark Baker and Phil Hall	Channel 5	17 November 2009	12.05
Madame Gazelle teaches the children all about numbers by playing games.
131	26	"Digging up the Road"	Neville Astley & Mark Baker	Neville Astley, Mark Baker and Phil Hall	Channel 5	18 November 2009	13.08
After finding hard-hat worker Mr. Bull on a trip to the playground, George and his friends decide to make a construction site of their own in a sandpit.
132	27	"Freddy Fox"	Neville Astley & Mark Baker	Neville Astley, Mark Baker and Phil Hall	Channel 5	24 September 2010	13.09, 42.10
Freddy Fox assists Peppa finding her friends during a game of hide and seek.
133	28	"Whistling"	Neville Astley & Mark Baker	Neville Astley, Mark Baker and Phil Hall	Channel 5	24 September 2010	14.02
Peppa tries to whistle, but finds it harder than she expected.
134	29	"Doctor Hamster's Tortoise"	Neville Astley & Mark Baker	Neville Astley, Mark Baker and Phil Hall	Channel 5	27 September 2010	14.03
The playgroup children meet Dr. Hamster's pets, but her tortoise Tiddles ends up getting stuck in a tree.
135	30	"Sun, Sea and Snow"	Neville Astley & Mark Baker	Neville Astley, Mark Baker and Phil Hall	Channel 5	27 September 2010	13.10, 20.07
Peppa and her friends go to the seaside during a snowy day.
136	31	"Grandpa Pig's Computer"	Neville Astley & Mark Baker	Neville Astley, Mark Baker and Phil Hall	Channel 5	28 September 2010	14.04
Mummy Pig gives Grandpa Pig her old computer.
137	32	"Hospital"	Neville Astley & Mark Baker	Neville Astley, Mark Baker and Phil Hall	Channel 5	28 September 2010	14.05
The playgroup visits Pedro Pony at the hospital.
138	33	"Spring"	Neville Astley & Mark Baker	Neville Astley, Mark Baker and Phil Hall	Channel 5	29 September 2010	14.06
Peppa and her friends go on an egg hunt when learning about spring.
139	34	"Miss Rabbit's Helicopter"	Neville Astley & Mark Baker	Neville Astley, Mark Baker and Phil Hall	Channel 5	29 September 2010	14.07
Miss Rabbit takes the children and Mummy Pig for a trip in her helicopter.
140	35	"Baby Alexander"	Neville Astley & Mark Baker	Neville Astley, Mark Baker and Phil Hall	Channel 5	30 September 2010	14.08, NP1.03
Peppa helps to look after Baby Alexander again.
141	36	"Grampy Rabbit's Lighthouse"	Neville Astley & Mark Baker	Neville Astley, Mark Baker and Phil Hall	Channel 5	30 September 2010	14.09
Peppa, George and Danny visit Grampy Rabbit's lighthouse on Granddad Dog's boat.
142	37	"Miss Rabbit's Day Off"	Neville Astley & Mark Baker	Neville Astley, Mark Baker and Phil Hall	Channel 5	1 October 2010	14.10
When Miss Rabbit trips over a toy car, the other parents have to do her jobs for her.
143	38	"The Secret Club"	Neville Astley & Mark Baker	Neville Astley, Mark Baker and Phil Hall	Nick Jr.	19 November 2010	16.02
Peppa and Suzy start up a club, but soon everyone wants to join!
144	39	"Grampy Rabbit's Boatyard"	Neville Astley & Mark Baker	Neville Astley, Mark Baker and Phil Hall	Nick Jr.	20 November 2010	15.02
When Grandpa Pig's boat is broken, Grandad Dog takes him and the children to Grampy Rabbit's boatyard.
145	40	"Shake, Rattle and Bang"	Neville Astley & Mark Baker	Neville Astley, Mark Baker and Phil Hall	Nick Jr.	20 November 2010	15.03
The children learn about music and put on a show for their parents.
146	41	"Champion Daddy Pig"	Neville Astley & Mark Baker	Neville Astley, Mark Baker and Phil Hall	Nick Jr.	21 November 2010	16.01, NP1.05
When Daddy Pig loses his title as Champion puddle-jumper, he tries to retake it.
147	42	"Chatterbox"	Neville Astley & Mark Baker	Neville Astley, Mark Baker and Phil Hall	Nick Jr,	21 November 2010	15.07
After Suzy criticises her for talking too much, Peppa decides to quit talking for one day.
148	43	"Mr. Fox's Van"	Neville Astley & Mark Baker	Neville Astley, Mark Baker and Phil Hall	Nick Jr.	22 November 2010	15.05
Freddy and Mr. Fox comes to visit Peppa and her friends and shows them his van.
149	44	"Chloé's Big Friends"	Neville Astley & Mark Baker	Neville Astley, Mark Baker and Phil Hall	Nick Jr.	22 November 2010	15.08
Peppa and George visit Chloé Pig, but she doesn't want to play any "baby" games with her friends.
150	45	"Gym Class"	Neville Astley & Mark Baker	Neville Astley, Mark Baker and Phil Hall	Nick Jr.	23 November 2010	15.10
The children go to Grampy Rabbit's gym class.
151	46	"The Blackberry Bush"	Neville Astley & Mark Baker	Neville Astley, Mark Baker and Phil Hall	Nick Jr.	23 November 2010	16.09
Mummy Pig is stuck in the blackberry bush.
152	47	"Pottery"	Neville Astley & Mark Baker	Neville Astley, Mark Baker and Phil Hall	Nick Jr.	24 November 2010	15.04
Mrs. Zebra teaches Peppa, George and her children pottery by making their own tea set.
153	48	"Paper Aeroplanes"	Neville Astley & Mark Baker	Neville Astley, Mark Baker and Phil Hall	Nick Jr.	24 November 2010	15.11
Peppa, George and Mummy Pig accidentally turn Daddy Pig's important workpapers into paper aeroplanes.
154	49	"Edmond Elephant's Birthday"	Neville Astley & Mark Baker	Neville Astley, Mark Baker and Phil Hall	Nick Jr.	25 November 2010	15.09
During Edmond Elephant's birthday party, Peppa and her friends find out how difficult it is to look after little children!
155	50	"The Biggest Muddy Puddle in the World"	Neville Astley & Mark Baker	Neville Astley, Mark Baker and Phil Hall	Nick Jr.	25 November 2010	15.06, NP1.04
There is a huge flash flood, so Peppa and George go shopping in Grandpa Pig's boat.
156	51	"Santa's Grotto"	Neville Astley & Mark Baker	Neville Astley, Mark Baker and Phil Hall	Nick Jr.	17 December 2010	13.01, 20.08
Peppa, George and their friends visit Santa at his grotto. Afterwards, they find out that their family are staying at Granny and Grandpa Pig's house for Christmas!
157	52	"Santa's Visit"	Neville Astley & Mark Baker	Neville Astley, Mark Baker and Phil Hall	Nick Jr.	17 December 2010	13.02, 20.09
Peppa and her family wake up on Christmas Day. Will they hope that they get everything for Christmas?

=== Series 4 (2011–2012) ===
No. overall	No. in series	Title	Original channel	Original release date	DVD reference
158	1	"Potato City"	Channel 5	23 May 2011	14.01
Peppa's family and her friends visit a new amusement park filled entirely with vegetables.
159	2	"The New House"	Channel 5	23 May 2011	16.03
Daddy Pig plans to build a new house, and Peppa meets her new neighbour, Wendy Wolf.
160	3	"Basketball"	Channel 5	24 May 2011	16.04
Daddy Pig teaches the children basketball.
161	4	"Horsey Twinkle Toes"	Channel 5	24 May 2011	16.05
Peppa and George are given a special package by their Auntie Dottie, who lives far away.
162	5	"Naughty Tortoise"	Channel 5	25 May 2011	16.06
Tiddles the tortoise ends causing a lot of trouble for all the emergency services at the same time!
163	6	"Mr. Fox's Shop"	Channel 5	25 May 2011	16.08
Peppa and George visit Mr. Fox's shop in an attempt to find something for Granny and Grandpa Pig's wedding anniversary.
164	7	"Shadows"	Channel 5	26 May 2011	16.07
Peppa and her friends learn about shadows.
165	8	"International Day"	Channel 5	26 May 2011	15.01, NP2.01
The playgroup kids celebrate "International Day", where everybody is dressed up in costumes and sing harmony, but they end up in an argument.
166	9	"The Rainy Day Game"	Channel 5	27 May 2011	18.02
It is raining, and Peppa and George are bored!
167	10	"Mummy Rabbit's Bump"	Channel 5	27 May 2011	16.10
Mummy Rabbit is pregnant. The kids wonder if she is going to give birth to a boy or a girl?
168	11	"Pedro the Cowboy"	Channel 5	30 May 2011	18.03
Pedro pretends to be a cowboy.
169	12	"Peppa and George's Garden"	Channel 5	30 May 2011	18.08
Peppa and George decide to make their own garden with the help of Grandpa Pig.
170	13	"The Flying Vet"	Channel 5	31 May 2011	18.04
Dr. Hamster has so many animals to help so she and the family go on her airplane to help them out.
171	14	"Kylie Kangaroo"	Channel 5	9 November 2011	18.05
Kylie Kangaroo and her family visit Peppa and her family.
172	15	"Captain Daddy Dog"	Channel 5	16 December 2011	18.07
Captain Daddy Dog returns home from sailing around the world.
173	16	"Grampy Rabbit's Dinosaur Park"	Channel 5	16 December 2011	18.06
Peppa and her friends are invited at Grampy Rabbit's dinosaur themed park for Freddy Fox's birthday.
174	17	"Bedtime Story"	Channel 5	19 December 2011	18.09
After George wakes up in the night, Peppa tells him a bedtime story in order to go to sleep.
175	18	"Lost Keys"	Channel 5	19 December 2011	18.10
Daddy Pig accidentally drops the car keys down the drain.
176	19	"George's New Dinosaur"	Channel 5	20 December 2011	19.05
After Mr. Dinosaur loses his tail, George buys a new one, but finds out that the new one is difficult to use because of its electronic components!
177	20	"Grandpa Pig's Train to the Rescue"	Channel 5	20 December 2011	19.06
When Miss Rabbit's train breaks down, it is Gertrude, Grandpa Pig's miniature locomotive - to save the day!
178	21	"The Pet Competition"	Channel 5	21 December 2011	19.07
Peppa and her children enter a pet competition held by Dr. Hamster.
179	22	"Spider Web"	Channel 5	21 December 2011	19.08
Peppa's family tries to get rid of Mr. Skinnylegs.
180	23	"The Noisy Night"	Channel 5	22 December 2011	19.09
Trouble ensures in Chloe's house when Baby Alexander keeps crying.
181	24	"The Wishing Well"	Channel 5	22 December 2011	19.10
Peppa and George visit Grandpa Pig's garden and he shows them his wishing well.
182	25	"Mr. Potato's Christmas Show"	Channel 5	23 December 2011	18.01, 20.10
Peppa joins her friends in watching Mr Potato's Christmas show.
183	26	"Madame Gazelle's Leaving Party"	Channel 5	23 December 2011	19.11
The children misunderstand that Madame Gazelle is leaving.
184	27	"The Queen"	Channel 5	4 June 2012	17.01, NP1.02
Peppa's playgroup visits the palace and meet the Queen.
185	28	"Desert Island"	Channel 5	5 June 2012	21.02
The grandpas are stuck on the desert island.
186	29	"Perfume"	Channel 5	6 June 2012	21.03
Peppa and George are making their own perfume.
187	30	"The Children's Fete"	Channel 5	7 June 2012	22.02
The playgroup kids are having their own school fete to raise money for a new school roof again!
188	31	"The Aquarium"	Channel 5	8 June 2012	21.04
The family take Goldie the fish to the aquarium and finds a friend.
189	32	"George's Racing Car"	Channel 5	11 June 2012	21.05
Grandpa Pig makes George his own racing car.
190	33	"The Little Boat"	Channel 5	12 June 2012	21.06
Grampy Rabbit takes the family on his canoe.
191	34	"The Sandpit"	Channel 5	13 June 2012	23.04
Peppa and her friends try and make their own city.
192	35	"Night Animals"	Channel 5	14 June 2012	21.08
Peppa and George have a sleepover at Granny and Grandpa's and learn about nocturnal creatures.
193	36	"Flying on Holiday"	Channel 5	15 June 2012	19.01
Peppa and her family pack up for the holiday and goes to the airport.
194	37	"The Holiday House"	Channel 5	18 June 2012	19.02
Peppa's family arrives in Italy for the holiday.
195	38	"Holiday in the Sun"	Channel 5	19 June 2012	19.03
Peppa's family goes to the market in Italy, buys souvenirs and eats pizzas.
196	39	"The End of the Holiday"	Channel 5	20 June 2012	19.04
The family are leaving Italy and Peppa missed Goldie the fish.
197	40	"Mirrors"	Channel 5	12 December 2012	21.09
Peppa and her friends go to the fair and enter the hall of mirrors.
198	41	"Pedro is Late"	Channel 5	13 December 2012	21.10
The playgroup kids take a quick tour at the museum, but Pedro Pony is left behind.
199	42	"Garden Games"	Channel 5	14 December 2012	22.04
Peppa, George and Suzy are bored, so they play some games found by Daddy Pig.
200	43	"Going Boating"	Channel 5	17 December 2012	23.08
The family takes a trip in a paddle boat, while Emily's use a rowing boat and Danny and Captain Dog use a sailboat.
201	44	"Mr. Bull in a China Shop"	Channel 5	18 December 2012	23.07
Mr. Bull's teapot breaks, so he takes Peppa and George to the China shop to repair it.
202	45	"Fruit"	Channel 5	19 December 2012	23.06
Miss Rabbit makes fruit smoothies.
203	46	"George's Balloon"	Channel 5	20 December 2012	22.03
George loses his dinosaur balloon.
204	47	"Peppa's Circus"	Channel 5	21 December 2012	21.01
Peppa and her friends open their own circus at Granny Pig's tent which is supposed to be a grown-up party.
205	48	"The Fish Pond"	Channel 5	24 December 2012	23.02
The family are lost in the woods.
206	49	"Snowy Mountain"	Channel 5	25 December 2012	20.01
The family goes to the ski resort where Madame Gazelle teaches the children skiing but Mummy Pig proves her wrong.
207	50	"Grampy Rabbit in Space"	Channel 5	26 December 2012	21.07
Grampy Rabbit loses his voice.
208	51	"The Olden Days"	Channel 5	27 December 2012	23.05
Peppa and Suzy remember when they were babies.
209	52	"Pirate Treasure"	Channel 5	28 December 2012	23.03
Pedro and his friends are playing pirate, but they end up losing something important!

=== Specials (2015–2016) ===
No. overall	No. in series	Title	Original channel	Written by	Original release date	DVD reference
210	2	"The Golden Boots"	Cinemas	Neville Astley & Mark Baker	14 February 2015	22.01
Mrs. Duck takes Peppa's golden boots, and she cannot win the big puddle competition without them.
211	3	"Pumpkin Party"	Nick Jr.	Neville Astley, Mark Baker and Phil Hall	26 October 2015	23.01
Daddy Pig holds a Halloween party at his house, and Peppa and George's friends come along, dressed up in all sorts of costumes.
212	4	"Around the World with Peppa"	Nick Jr.	Neville Astley & Mark Baker	6 March 2016	NP2.01
When their car breaks down, the family borrow Miss Rabbit's aeroplane and have a big adventure that takes them all over the world.

=== Series 5 (2016–2018) ===
No. overall	No. in series	Title	Original channel	Original release date	DVD reference
213	1	"Playing Pretend"	Channel 5	24 October 2016	24.02
Peppa's bike tyre goes flat, so she and her friends pretend they are riding on bikes and even pretend to splash in Muddy Puddles!
214	2	"The Castle"	Nick Jr. (US)	23 October 2016 (Nick Jr.); 25 October 2016 (Channel 5)	24.03
Peppa and her family go to a castle and meet a huge dragon. George is really enjoying it very much.
215	3	"Miss Rabbit's Taxi"	Channel 5	26 October 2016	24.04
It's another day in the life for Miss Rabbit, as she takes Peppa and her family back home from shopping in her taxi!
216	4	"Scooters"	Channel 5	27 October 2016	24.05
Mummy and Daddy Pig find out that scooters are fun to play on.
217	5	"Pumpkin Competition"	Nick Jr. (US)	23 October 2016 (Nick Jr.); 28 October 2016 (Channel 5)	24.06
There's a Pumpkin competition at Peppa's playgroup.
218	6	"Gerald Giraffe"	Nick Jr. (US)	23 October 2016 (Nick Jr.); 31 October 2016 (Channel 5)	24.01
The playgroup kids meet the new student, Gerald Giraffe, but he is feeling sad because he is very tall and cannot play hide and seek.
219	7	"Parachute Jump"	Channel 5	26 March 2017	28.04
Mummy Pig agrees to do a parachute jump after the playgroup roof gets a leak again.
220	8	"Easter Bunny"	Nick Jr. (US)	14 April 2017 (Nick Jr.); 15 April 2017 (Channel 5)	26.01
Peppa and her friends cannot wait to see the Easter bunny.
221	9	"Simple Science"	ABC Kids (Australia)	23 June 2017 (ABC Kids); 24 July 2017 (Channel 5)	26.03
Daddy Pig teaches Peppa and her friends about concrete.
222	10	"School Project"	ABC Kids (Australia)	26 June 2017 (ABC Kids); 25 July 2017 (Channel 5)	26.04
Peppa and her playgroup friends are making model castles at home.
223	11	"Mummy Pig's Book"	ABC Kids (Australia)	28 June 2017 (ABC Kids); 26 July 2017 (Channel 5)	TBD
Mummy Pig finishes her computer work ready to be published as a storybook, but with a slight printing error!
224	12	"Grandpa Pig's Greenhouse"	Channel 5	27 July 2017	26.07
Grandpa Pig and Grandad Dog take Peppa and George to their greenhouses.
225	13	"Molly Mole"	Channel 5	28 July 2017	26.02
Peppa's playgroup meet a new student, and find out how good she is at building holes!
226	14	"Move to Music"	Cinemas	7 April 2017 (Cinemas); 21 June 2017 (ABC Kids); 31 July 2017 (Channel 5)	25.09
The playgroup children dance to various types of music.
227	15	"London"	Cinemas	7 April 2017 (Cinemas); 22 June 2017 (ABC Kids); 1 August 2017 (Channel 5)	25.01
The playgroup children go on a tour in London with the Queen.
228	16	"The Police"	Cinemas	7 April 2017 (Cinemas); 27 June 2017 (ABC Kids); 2 August 2017 (Channel 5)	25.02
PC Panda and PC Squirrel visit Peppa's playgroup.
229	17	"The Zoo"	Cinemas	7 April 2017 (Cinemas); 29 June 2017 (ABC Kids); 3 August 2017 (Channel 5)	25.04
Madame Gazelle takes the playgroup children to the zoo.
230	18	"Canal Boat"	Cinemas	7 April 2017 (Cinemas); 4 August 2017 (Channel 5)	25.03
Captain Dog takes Peppa, George and Danny to the canal during his birthday.
231	19	"The Outback"	Cinemas	7 April 2017 (Cinemas); 9 July 2017 (ABC Kids); 7 August 2017 (Channel 5)	25.05
Peppa and her family are in Australia and meet Kylie, and they are having a barbeque.
232	20	"Surfing"	Cinemas	7 April 2017 (Cinemas); 9 July 2017 (ABC Kids); 8 August 2017 (Channel 5)	25.06
Kylie takes Peppa and George to the beach where they take surfing lessons.
233	21	"The Great Barrier Reef"	Cinemas	7 April 2017 (Cinemas); 9 July 2017 (ABC Kids); 9 August 2017 (Channel 5)	25.07
Kylie and her mummy take the family to the Great Barrier Reef in Mummy Kangaroo's submarine.
234	22	"Boomerang"	Cinemas	7 April 2017 (Cinemas); 9 July 2017 (ABC Kids); 10 August 2017 (Channel 5)	25.08
Kylie gives Peppa a farewell present.
235	23	"Nursery Rhymes"	Channel 5	4 September 2017	26.05
The playgroup children sing their favourite nursery rhymes.
236	24	"Masks"	Channel 5	5 September 2017	26.09
Peppa and her playgroup friends are making masks.
237	25	"Digger World"	Channel 5	6 September 2017	26.06
The family heads to Digger World.
238	26	"The Doll Hospital"	Channel 5	7 September 2017	28.08
When Teddy is covered in mud, Mummy Pig takes Peppa, George and Suzy to the doll hospital.
239	27	"Wendy Wolf's Birthday"	Channel 5	8 September 2017	28.03
The kids have fun at Wendy Wolf's birthday party.
240	28	"George's Woolly Hat"	Channel 5	11 September 2017	TBA
George has a new hat, and when he and Peppa visit Granny and Grandpa Pig, Mummy Pig hopes it will stay clean.
241	29	"Sailing Boat"	Channel 5	12 September 2017	26.08
Grandpa takes Peppa and George sailing and learn about tides.
242	30	"Soft Play"	Channel 5	13 September 2017	26.10
George and Mummy Pig head to Richard Rabbit's birthday party at the soft play centre, but the grown-ups got stuck in the soft play equipments.
243	31	"The Market"	Channel 5	14 September 2017	TBA
The family heads off to the market to buy some things.
244	32	"Father Christmas"	Channel 5	7 December 2017	27.10
Danny Dog dresses up as Father Christmas for the Christmas pageant.
245	33	"Peppa Goes to Paris"	Channel 5	7 May 2018	27.08
Peppa's family visits Delphine and her family in Paris, and Daddy Pig is scared of heights as he gets to the top of the Eiffel Tower.
246	34	"Grandpa Pig's Pond"	Channel 5	4 May 2018	27.02
Peppa, George, and Grandpa Pig discover treasure whilst digging a new pond.
247	35	"Once Upon a Time"	Channel 5	8 May 2018	27.03
The family takes a shortcut through the woods to Granny and Grandpa Pig's house. Peppa notices that it's like the stories in her fairy tales.
248	36	"Police Station"	Channel 5	1 May 2018	27.05
George loses Mr. Dinosaur, so the family head to the police station and see if the police officers can help.
249	37	"When I Grow Up"	Channel 5	30 April 2018	27.01
The playgroup children decide what to be when they grow up.
250	38	"The Ambulance"	Channel 5	2 May 2018	27.04
Dr. Brown Bear visits the playgroup.
251	39	"Doctors"	Channel 5	3 May 2018	27.06
The playgroup children learn about types of doctors after Pedro tries to rescue Tiddles.
252	40	"Super Potato"	Nickelodeon (US)	21 May 2018 (Nickelodeon); 26 May 2018 (Channel 5)	27.07
Mr. Potato visits the playgroup alongside Super Potato.
253	41	"Grampy Rabbit's Hovercraft"	Channel 5	10 May 2018	27.09
Grampy Rabbit takes Peppa, George and Grandpa Pig for a ride in his hovercraft.
254	42	"Playgroup Star"	Channel 5	11 May 2018	28.07
Peppa wonders why Daddy Pig never got a playgroup star when he was younger.
255	43	"The Carnival"	Channel 5	10 September 2018	28.01
There's a carnival happening in town which Peppa, George, Suzy and Molly take part in.
256	44	"Mr. Bull's New Road"	Channel 5	11 September 2018	TBA
Mr. Bull and his brother try to help build a new road where Dr. Hamster's clinic is.
257	45	"Caves"	Channel 5	12 September 2018	28.05
Grampy Rabbit takes the family caving.
258	46	"Grandpa's Toy Plane"	Channel 5	13 September 2018	28.06
Grandpa Pig shows Peppa and George his toy airplane.
259	47	"George's New Clothes"	Channel 5	14 September 2018	28.10
After George's clothes get shrunk in the wash, the family go to the clothing store to find some to suit him.
260	48	"Madame Gazelle's House"	Channel 5	17 September 2018	TBA
The family visit Madame Gazelle's house, and notice how all wonky it really is!
261	49	"Long Train Journey"	Channel 5	18 September 2018	TBA
Daddy Pig has to go to another country, but Peppa and George want to go too, so they had to go by train.
262	50	"Suzy Goes Away"	Channel 5	19 September 2018	28.09
Peppa finds out that Suzy Sheep is moving to the other side of the world, but since Mummy Sheep didn't get her job, Suzy is not leaving and staying forever.
263	51	"Tiny Land"	Channel 5	20 September 2018	28.02
The family and Suzy visit Tiny Land.
264	52	"Stamps"	Channel 5	21 September 2018	TBA
Peppa and George learn about stamps when visiting Granny and Grandpa Pig.

=== Film (2017) ===
Title	Original channel	Original release date	DVD reference
"My First Cinema Experience"	Cinemas	7 April 2017	25
A 72-minute theatrical release composed of previously unreleased episodes from Series 5 (as per DVD below), with musical interludes featuring the stage-show puppet versions of Peppa and George, and their friend Daisy (played by Emma Grace Arends).

=== Series 6 (2019–2020) ===
No. overall	No. in series	Title	Original channel	Original release date	DVD reference
265	1	"The Panda Twins"	ABC Kids (Australia)	3 February 2019 (ABC Kids); 4 February 2019 (Nickelodeon); 5 February 2019 (Channel 5); 6 February 2019 (Cinemas - China)	30.03
PC Panda brings his twin daughters, Peggi and Pandora, to playgroup. They love puzzles and solving mysteries, just like their dad.
266	2	"Chinese New Year"	ABC Kids (Australia); Nickelodeon (US)	4 February 2019 (ABC Kids and Nickelodeon); 5 February 2019 (Channel 5); 6 February 2019 (Cinemas - China)	30.04
Madame Gazelle teaches the children about Chinese New Year. They learn about sweeping out the old year, and how lucky the colour red is. Together they make a dragon costume, and parade up the hill to watch the fireworks.
267	3	"Mandy Mouse"	ABC Kids (Australia)	6 February 2019 (ABC Kids); 26 March 2019 (Channel 5)	30.01
Peppa's playgroup have a new friend to meet - Mandy Mouse. Mandy uses a wheelchair. The children have a lot of fun playing with Mandy as she is super sporty and loves to play games.
268	4	"Recorders"	ABC Kids (Australia)	7 February 2019 (ABC Kids); 27 March 2019 (Channel 5)	30.05
The playgroup children are practicing playing their recorders at home and at Playgroup.
269	5	"Miss Rabbit's Relaxation Class"	ABC Kids (Australia)	8 February 2019 (ABC Kids); 28 March 2019 (Channel 5)	30.06
Mummy Pig tries to relax from interruptions. However, a gym class and a children's birthday party taking place at the same time prove to be a bit too much for her!
270	6	"Parking Ticket"	ABC Kids (Australia)	9 February 2019 (ABC Kids); 29 March 2019 (Channel 5)	33.09
Daddy Pig gets told off because Miss Rabbit the traffic warden gives him a parking ticket whilst his back was turned.
271	7	"Lots of Muddy Puddles"	ABC Kids (Australia)	5 February 2019 (ABC Kids); 25 March 2019 (Channel 5)	30.02
The family go for a drive in search of different types of puddles.
272	8	"Fathers Day"	ABC Kids (Australia)	10 February 2019 (ABC Kids); 10 June 2019 (Nick Jr.); 16 June 2019 (Channel 5)	30.07
Peppa and George are making a cake for Daddy Pig with their own ingredients.
273	9	"Funny Music"	ABC Kids (Australia)	11 February 2019 (ABC Kids); 1 April 2019 (Channel 5)	30.08
Daddy Pig has got a new synthesizer, and whilst he leaves, Peppa and George make funny sounds.
274	10	"Buttercups, Daisies and Dandelions"	ABC Kids (Australia)	12 February 2019 (ABC Kids); 2 April 2019 (Channel 5)	30.09
Peppa and George visit Chloe and learn about different flowers.
275	11	"The Marble Run"	ABC Kids (Australia)	13 February 2019 (ABC Kids); 3 April 2019 (Channel 5)	30.10
Peppa and Rebecca are building the biggest marble run ever!
276	12	"Grandpa Pig's Metal Detector"	ABC Kids (Australia)	14 February 2019 (ABC Kids); 4 April 2019 (Channel 5)	30.11
George loses the wind-up metal key for his new toy robot.
277	13	"World Book Day"	ABC Kids (Australia)	15 February 2019 (ABC Kids); 7 March 2019 (Channel 5)	30.12
Madame Gazelle asks the children to come as their favourite book character for World Book Day, but Peppa is unable to decide which book or character is her favourite.
278	14	"Children's Festival"	Cinemas	5 April 2019 (Cinemas); 29 July 2019 (Channel 5); 5 August 2019 (ABC Kids)	29.06
The family head to the Children's festival.
279	15	"Muddy Festival"	Cinemas	5 April 2019 (Cinemas); 30 July 2019 (Channel 5); 5 August 2019 (ABC Kids)	29.07
In her second day at the Children's Festival, which has been muddy thanks to the rain, Peppa learns about activities involving mud.
280	16	"Strawberries"	Cinemas	5 April 2019 (Cinemas); 7 August 2019 (ABC Kids); 30 September 2019 (Channel 5)	29.05
Peppa and George go strawberry picking with Granny and Grandpa.
281	17	"Grandpa Pig's Birthday"	Cinemas	5 April 2019 (Cinemas); 8 August 2019 (ABC Kids); 1 October 2019 (Channel 5)	29.10
Peppa's family go to a fancy restaurant for Grandpa Pig's Birthday.
282	18	"The Petting Farm"	Cinemas	5 April 2019 (Cinemas); 9 August 2019 (ABC Kids); 2 October 2019 (Channel 5)	29.01
Peppa, George and Rebecca go the petting farm and learn about hygiene when washing their hands after touching animals.
283	19	"Pizza! Pizza!"	Cinemas	5 April 2019 (Cinemas); 10 August 2019 (ABC Kids); 3 October 2019 (Channel 5)	29.04
Peppa and her family make their own pizza.
284	20	"TV Land"	Cinemas	5 April 2019 (Cinemas); 11 August 2019 (ABC Kids); 18 October 2019 (Channel 5)	29.08
Peppa's family, along with Emily and Edmond Elephant, go into the TV studio to see how TV works.
285	21	"Roman Day"	Cinemas	5 April 2019 (Cinemas); 12 August 2019 (ABC Kids); 4 October 2019 (Nick Jr.); 7 October 2019 (Channel 5)	29.09
Peppa and George visit Granny and Grandpa when Granny Pig has a Roman Day with her friends.
286	22	"Bird Spotting"	Cinemas	5 April 2019 (Cinemas); 13 August 2019 (ABC Kids); 8 October 2019 (Channel 5)	29.02
Peppa and George go birdwatching with Grandpa Pig.
287	23	"Super Potato Movie"	Cinemas	5 April 2019 (Cinemas); 14 August 2019 (ABC Kids); 9 October 2019 (Channel 5)	29.03
Peppa's playgroup go to the cinema and see Super Potato.
288	24	"Bat and Ball"	ABC Kids	15 August 2019 (ABC Kids); 10 October 2019 (Channel 5)	TBA
Peppa's playgroup are playing baseball.
289	25	"Buried Treasure"	ABC Kids	16 August 2019 (ABC Kids); 11 October 2019 (Channel 5)	TBA
Molly Mole discovers a treasure chest whilst digging a tunnel.
290	26	"Christmas at The Hospital"	Channel 5	13 December 2019 (Channel 5); 15 December 2019 (Nick Jr.); 20 December 2019 (ABC Kids)	31.01
Peppa hurts her arm on Christmas Day, so her family take her to the hospital and visit Santa.
291	27	"Valentine's Day"	Channel 5	8 February 2020	32.01
Peppa and her playgroup friends are making cards for Daddy Pig. Note: This is the first episode to feature Amelie Bea Smith as Peppa Pig.
292	28	"The Perfect Day"	Nick Jr. (US)	14 February 2020 (Nick Jr.); 17 February 2020 (Channel 5)	31.02
Whilst Mummy Pig is at the spa, Peppa, George and Daddy Pig wander around in the shopping centre.
293	29	"Breakfast Club"	Nick Jr. (US)	14 February 2020 (Nick Jr.); 18 February 2020 (Channel 5)	31.03
Peppa and her friends have breakfast together at school, and learn about how food gives them energy.
294	30	"The Botanical Gardens"	Channel 5	19 February 2020	31.04
Miss Rabbit shows Peppa's family around the botanical gardens.
295	31	"Mr Potato's Fruit and Vegetable Quiz"	Channel 5	20 February 2020	31.05
Mr Potato visits the school to talk about fruit and vegetables and set the pupils a quiz on what they have learned.
296	32	"Viking Day"	Channel 5	21 February 2020	31.06
Granny Pig takes Peppa and George to learn about Vikings with her friends.
297	33	"Made Up Musical Instruments"	Channel 5	24 February 2020	31.07
The playgroup children make homemade musical instruments.
298	34	"In the Future"	Channel 5	25 February 2020	31.08
When Charlotte Sheep looks after Suzy during a sleepover with Peppa, the girls imagine what their world looks like in the future.
299	35	"Doctor Hamster's Big Present"	Nick Jr. (US)	14 February 2020 (Nick Jr.); 26 February 2020 (Channel 5)	31.09
Dr. Hamster is hard at work so Grampy Rabbit, Peppa and George give her a wheel to help her.
300	36	"Butterflies"	Channel 5	27 February 2020	31.10
Dr. Hamster shows the children her caterpillars which they make butterfly wings and go through the life cycle.
301	37	"Grampy Rabbit's Jet Pack"	Channel 5	28 February 2020	31.11
When the family visit Grampy Rabbit, he shows off his jet pack, but he helps out Miss Rabbit.
302	38	"Detective Potato"	Channel 5	2 March 2020	31.12
While driving to the shopping centre, Daddy Pig can't remember where he parked his car, so Mr. Potato uses his detective skills to help out.
303	39	"The Electric Car"	Channel 5	3 March 2020	33.11
When Daddy Pig returns with a borrowed car that relies on batteries instead of petrol, the family give it a test drive.
304	40	"Stone Age Granny"	Channel 5	21 September 2020	32.02
Peppa and George join Granny Pig and her group to learn about the Stone Age.
305	41	"Space Adventure!"	Channel 5	22 September 2020	32.03
Peppa and George reenact the Moon landing with help from Grampy Rabbit and Granny Pig and her group.
306	42	"Fire Station Practice"	Channel 5	23 September 2020	32.04
The Mummy's fire service go over a training course with Peppa, George and Daddy Pig joining in.
307	43	"Mr Bull the Teacher"	Channel 5	24 September 2020	32.05
Mr. Bull teaches the children about trying to fix a squeaky floorboard while Madame Gazelle goes to a dentist appointment.
308	44	"Looking for Things"	Channel 5	25 September 2020	33.10
Peppa and George play a game where they look for random objects.
309	45	"Poems"	Channel 5	28 September 2020	32.06
The children learn about poems at playgroup, and they recite one.
310	46	"Please and Thank You"	Channel 5	29 September 2020	32.07
Madame Gazelle teaches the children about manners.
311	47	"Ice Cream"	Channel 5	30 September 2020	32.08
Mr. Labrador runs out of ice cream at his stall.
312	48	"Science Museum"	Channel 5	1 October 2020	32.09
Madame Gazelle and the playgroup children go to a science museum.
313	49	"Jukebox"	Channel 5	2 October 2020	32.10
Grandpa takes Peppa, George and Granny Pig to the sailor's club where they find a jukebox and learn about different types of music.
314	50	"Windmills"	Channel 5	5 October 2020	32.11
After Mr. Bull places a windmill close to the playgroup, Madame Gazelle teaches the playgroup children about them.
315	51	"Mandy Mouse's Birthday"	Channel 5	6 October 2020	32.12
Mandy Mouse takes Peppa and the rest of the children to Cheese World for her birthday.
316	52	"The Sandcastle"	Channel 5	7 October 2020	33.12
The family builds a sandcastle alongside Pedro and Wendy.

=== Series 7 (2021–2023) ===
No. overall	No. in series	Title	Premiere	Original release date	DVD reference
317	1	"America"	Nickelodeon (US)	5 March 2021 (Nickelodeon); 8 March 2021 (Channel 5); 13 May 2021 (YouTube)	33.01
Peppa and her family win a holiday to America.
318	2	"The Diner"	Nickelodeon (US)	5 March 2021 (Nickelodeon); 9 March 2021 (Channel 5); 6 November 2021 (YouTube)	33.02
The family travel in a campervan and stop by at a diner.
319	3	"Canyon Country"	Nickelodeon (US)	5 March 2021 (Nickelodeon); 10 March 2021 (Channel 5); 7 November 2021 (YouTube)	33.03
A drive around America leads to adventure for the family, where they discover all sorts of various places, including a cave.
320	4	"Hollywood"	Nickelodeon (US)	5 March 2021 (Nickelodeon); 11 March 2021 (Channel 5); 7 November 2021 (YouTube)	33.04
Peppa and family make it to Hollywood. They see how a film is made, and even meet up with Mr. Potato and Hash Brown.
321	5	"Motorbiking!"	Channel 5	12 March 2021 (Channel 5); 2 July 2021 (Nick Jr.); 8 November 2021 (YouTube)	33.05
Peppa and George are in for a surprise when they go camping with Granny and Grandpa Pig.
322	6	"Sea Treasure"	Channel 5	15 March 2021 (Channel 5); 2 July 2021 (Nick Jr.); 9 November 2021 (YouTube)	33.06
Peppa and George explore the seaside while on their camping trip.
323	7	"Monkey Has a Cough"	Channel 5	16 March 2021 (Channel 5); 2 July 2021 (Nick Jr.); 9 November 2021 (YouTube)	TBA
After knowing how to pretending by using a winking gesture, Peppa shows Zoe Zebra how to do it.
324	8	"Police Car"	Channel 5	17 March 2021 (Channel 5); 2 July 2021 (Nick Jr.); 9 November 2021 (YouTube)	33.07
The police return to the playgroup and offer Peppa and Freddy the chance to spend the day with them.
325	9	"Hop, Skip, Jump!"	Nickelodeon (US)	5 March 2021 (Nickelodeon); 18 March 2021 (Channel 5); 10 November 2021 (YouTube)	TBA
Peppa and her friends play games that show their abilities to hop, skip and jump.
326	10	"Rescuing Miss Rabbit!"	Channel 5	19 March 2021 (Channel 5); 9 July 2021 (Nick Jr.); 10 November 2021 (YouTube)	33.08
Usually, Miss Rabbit helps out to rescue everyone, but when she gets stuck on a roof, it's herself who needs help this time!
327	11	"Peppa's Diary"	Channel 5	22 March 2021 (Channel 5); 9 July 2021 (Nick Jr.); 11 November 2021 (YouTube)	TBA
Peppa gets inspired by Mummy Pig to write a diary of all the things she enjoys.
328	12	"Playing Golf"	Channel 5	23 March 2021 (Channel 5); 9 July 2021 (Nick Jr.); 11 November 2021 (YouTube)	TBA
Peppa, George and Grandpa Pig are visiting a golf course, and they soon start playing mini golf.
329	13	"Creepy Crawly Safari"	Channel 5	24 March 2021 (Channel 5); 9 July 2021 (Nick Jr.); 12 November 2021 (YouTube)	TBA
On a playgroup trip to a nature reserve, Pedro Pony brings his stick insect with him.
330	14	"Hoops"	Channel 5	6 September 2021 (Channel 5); 5 October 2021 (Nickelodeon); 12 November 2021 (YouTube)	TBA
Peppa's playgroup learn how to use spinning hoops, but they find it hard to make them spin.
331	15	"The Park"	Channel 5	7 September 2021 (Channel 5); 4 October 2021 (Nickelodeon); 13 November 2021 (YouTube)	TBA
Peppa and her family visit the park. Peppa's friends see which kinds of equipment they're the best at.
332	16	"The Life Boat"	Channel 5	8 September 2021 (Channel 5); 4 October 2021 (Nickelodeon); 13 November 2021 (YouTube)	TBA
Danny Dog and Peppa learn about saving people in the sea with Grampy Rabbit.
333	17	"Lucky Hamper"	Channel 5	9 September 2021 (Channel 5); 4 October 2021 (Nickelodeon); 14 November 2021 (YouTube)	TBA
Peppa's playgroup help create a hamper of goods for a charity raffle.
334	18	"Jelly"	Channel 5	10 September 2021 (Channel 5); 6 October 2021 (Nickelodeon); 14 November 2021 (YouTube)	TBA
While Mummy Pig is working on the computer, Peppa, George and Daddy Pig make a jelly to surprise her for working hard.
335	19	"Potty Training"	Channel 5	13 September 2021 (Channel 5); 6 October 2021 (Nickelodeon); 15 November 2021 (YouTube)	TBA
When George has an accident, Peppa and her family help him with potty training.
336	20	"Trampolines"	Channel 5	14 September 2021 (Channel 5); 5 October 2021 (Nickelodeon); 15 November 2021 (YouTube)	TBA
Peppa and her friends visit the trampoline park. Mummy Pig, Daddy Pig and Mummy Sheep realise that it is quite fun to bounce as well; however, Mummy Pig soon ends up in trouble when she has too much fun.
337	21	"Health Check"	Channel 5	15 September 2021 (Channel 5); 6 October 2021 (Nickelodeon); 16 November 2021 (YouTube)	TBA
Peppa goes for her yearly check-up at the doctors.
338	22	"Skateboarding"	Channel 5	16 September 2021 (Channel 5); 5 October 2021 (Nickelodeon); 16 November 2021 (YouTube)	TBA
Peppa and her family visit the skate park. Peppa enjoys playing on Daddy Pig's skateboard.
339	23	"Mountain Climbing"	Channel 5	17 September 2021 (Channel 5); 5 October 2021 (Nickelodeon); 17 November 2021 (YouTube)	TBA
Peppa and her friends visit the climbing centre with Grampy Rabbit as their guide. However, when George gets too scared to climb down a climbing wall, Mummy Pig is ready to save him, but she soon has her own worries.
340	24	"Police Boat"	Channel 5	20 September 2021 (Channel 5); 4 October 2021 (Nickelodeon); 17 November 2021 (YouTube)	TBA
Officers Panda and Squirrel mistake Peppa, George and Freddy Fox as pirates during a day on the seas with Grandpa Pig.
341	25	"The Tractor"	Channel 5	21 September 2021 (Channel 5); 6 October 2021 (Nickelodeon); 18 November 2021 (YouTube)	TBA
Peppa's family visit Mrs Badger's farm and learn how useful tractors are, even if they're slow.
342	26	"Christmas with Kylie Kangaroo"	YouTube	18 November 2021 (YouTube); 8 December 2021 (Nick Jr.); 13 December 2021 (Channel 5)	TBA
Peppa and her family visit Kylie Kangaroo for Christmas and realise that Christmas is so much different in Australia!
343	27	"Winter Games"	YouTube	19 November 2021 (YouTube); 8 December 2021 (Nick Jr.); 7 February 2022 (Channel 5)	TBA
Everybody is once again skiing on the mountains, but an unpredictable Mummy Pig once again showcases her skiing skills.
344	28	"Undersea Party"	YouTube	19 November 2021 (YouTube); 28 March 2022 (Channel 5); 21 June 2022 (Nickelodeon)	TBA
Peppa celebrates Goldie's birthday by holding a undersea party - by turning the house into an underwater environment!
345	29	"The Clubhouse"	Channel 5	29 March 2022 (Channel 5); 30 May 2022 (Nickelodeon); 6 September 2022 (YouTube)	TBA
Mr. Bull builds a clubhouse for Peppa and her friends.
346	30	"Detective Club"	Channel 5	30 March 2022 (Channel 5); 30 May 2022 (Nickelodeon)	TBA
Peppa and her friends become detectives in the clubhouse.
347	31	"Clubhouse Shop"	Channel 5	31 March 2022 (Channel 5); 30 May 2022 (Nickelodeon)	TBA
Peppa and her friends run a shop in the clubhouse.
348	32	"Clubhouse Adventure"	Channel 5	1 April 2022 (Channel 5); 30 May 2022 (Nickelodeon)	TBA
At the clubhouse, Peppa and her friends make stories about wild animals.
349	33	"Talking"	YouTube	20 November 2021 (YouTube); 10 February 2022 (Nickelodeon); 4 April 2022 (Channel 5)	TBA
Lotte Llama joins playgroup and teaches the others on how to speak German.
350	34	"Woodland Club"	YouTube	20 November 2021 (YouTube); 5 April 2022 (Channel 5); 21 June 2022 (Nickelodeon)	TBA
Peppa and her friends visit Mr. Wolf's Woodland Club.
351	35	"Danny's Pirate Bedroom"	YouTube	21 November 2021 (YouTube); 6 April 2022 (Channel 5); 21 June 2022 (Nickelodeon)	TBA
Peppa helps out with Danny Dog refurbishing his bedroom, and imagine a pirate adventure along the way.
352	36	"Weather Station"	YouTube	21 November 2021 (YouTube); 10 February 2022 (Nickelodeon); 7 April 2022 (Channel 5)	TBA
Peppa's playgroup learn about the weather.
353	37	"Roller Disco"	YouTube	22 November 2021 (YouTube); 10 February 2022 (Nickelodeon); 8 April 2022 (Channel 5)	TBA
Peppa and friends visit the Roller Disco rink.
354	38	"Guinea Pigs"	YouTube	22 November 2021 (YouTube); 11 April 2022 (Channel 5); 21 June 2022 (Nickelodeon)	TBA
Peppa looks after Madame Gazelle's guinea pigs Ginger and Brian while she goes on holiday but prove to be more trouble for Mummy and Daddy Pig than they think.
355	39	"Grandpa's Rock Garden"	YouTube	23 November 2021 (YouTube); 12 April 2022 (Channel 5); 5 December 2022 (Nick Jr.)	TBA
Peppa and George help out Grandpa Pig create a rock garden.
356	40	"Charity Shop"	YouTube	23 November 2021 (YouTube); 5 September 2022 (Channel 5); 13 December 2022 (Nick Jr.)	TBA
Peppa, George and Daddy Pig visit the charity shop to sell things they don't need, and things they may need!
357	41	"Families"	Channel 5	6 September 2022 (Channel 5); 9 September 2022 (YouTube); 12 December 2022 (Nick Jr.)	TBA
At playgroup, Peppa and her friends talk about their families. In this episode, Peppa Pig introduced its first same-sex couple, Penny Polar Bear's mothers.
358	42	"The Owl"	YouTube	24 November 2021 (YouTube); 7 September 2022 (Channel 5); 19 December 2022 (Nick Jr.)	TBA
Peppa, George, Grandpa and Granny go owl-spotting.
359	43	"The Apple Tree"	YouTube	24 November 2021 (YouTube); 8 September 2022 (Channel 5); 20 December 2022 (Nick Jr.)	TBA
The family visit the apple tree and notice how it changes every season as they keep visiting it.
360	44	"The Big Hill"	Channel 5	15 September 2022* (Channel 5); 21 December 2022 (Nick Jr.)	TBA
During a family hike, Peppa decides to walk up the big hill. * This episode was originally scheduled for 9 September 2022, but was pre-empted by C5's coverage of the death of Queen Elizabeth II.
361	45	"Hippies"	Channel 5	12 September 2022 (Channel 5); 14 December 2022 (Nick Jr.)	TBA
Granny Pig talks about her time in the 1960s.
362	46	"Bug Hotel"	YouTube	25 November 2021 (YouTube); 13 September 2022 (Channel 5); 22 December 2022 (Nick Jr.)	TBA
Peppa and George check out Grandpa's new Bug Hotel.
363	47	"Parachute Games"	YouTube	25 November 2021 (YouTube); 14 September 2022 (Channel 5); 5 December 2022 (Nick Jr.)	TBA
The Playgroup play many games using a parachute.
364	48	"Flying Discs"	YouTube	26 November 2021 (YouTube); 21 September 2022* (Channel 5); 6 December 2022 (Nick Jr.)	TBA
The family visit Danny Dog at the park, who has a new flying discs. * This episode was originally scheduled for 15 September 2022, but was put back by the rescheduling of "The Big Hill" as a result of C5's coverage of the death of Queen Elizabeth II.
365	49	"Kiddie Workout!"	YouTube	26 November 2021 (YouTube); 16 September 2022 (Channel 5); 7 December 2022 (Nick Jr.)	TBA
Mr. Potato visits the playgroup to showcase an exercise class.
366	50	"Little Cars"	YouTube	27 November 2021 (YouTube); 19 September 2022 (Channel 5); 15 December 2022 (Nick Jr.)	TBA
Peppa and her friends visit the Little Cars Play Centre.
367	51	"Monkey Trees"	Channel 5	20 September 2022 (Channel 5); 8 December 2022 (Nick Jr.)	TBA
Peppa and her family go swinging through the monkey trees with Danny Dog.
368	52	"Grandpa Pig's Christmas Present"	YouTube	27 November 2021 (YouTube); 5 December 2022 (Nick Jr.); 13 December 2022 (Channel 5)	TBA
Grandpa Pig receives a drone (or to him, a Quad-Copter) for Christmas, but he soon loses it.
369	53	"Canoe Trip"	YouTube	28 November 2021 (YouTube); 6 February 2023 (Channel 5); 14 June 2023 (Nick Jr.)	TBA
The family go canoeing.
370	54	"The Holiday"	YouTube	28 November 2021 (YouTube); 7 February 2023 (Channel 5); 15 June 2023 (Nick Jr.)	TBA
The family go on holiday to a small house that's actually quite small!
371	55	"The Water Park"	Channel 5	8 February 2023 (Channel 5); 13 June 2023 (Nick Jr.)	TBA
Peppa and her family visit the Water Park.
372	56	"Dinosaur Party"	YouTube	29 November 2021 (YouTube); 9 February 2023 (Channel 5); 20 June 2023 (Nick Jr.)	TBA
Granny and Grandpa Pig hold a Dinosaur Party, with a few friends attending.
373	57	"Superhero Party"	YouTube	29 November 2021 (YouTube); 10 February 2023 (Channel 5); 19 June 2023 (Nick Jr.)	TBA
It's Pedro Pony's birthday, which turns out to be super when Miss Rabbit gets trapped on a giant balloon!
374	58	"A Day with Doctor Hamster"	YouTube	30 November 2021 (YouTube); 13 February 2023 (Channel 5); 22 June 2023 (Nick Jr.)	TBA
Peppa and Suzy spend the day with Doctor Hamster, and show how hard it can be to look after animals.
375	59	"Playgroup Garden"	Channel 5	14 February 2023 (Channel 5); 21 June 2023 (Nick Jr.)	TBA
The Playgroup children have fun in the garden growing plants and playing hide and seek.
376	60	"Bowling"	Channel 5	15 February 2023 (Channel 5); 22 June 2023 (Nick Jr.)	TBA
Danny and Grandad Dog show Peppa, George, and Grandpa Pig how to bowl.
377	61	"Swimming Lesson"	YouTube	30 November 2021 (YouTube); 16 February 2023 (Channel 5); 12 June 2023 (Nick Jr.)	TBA
Peppa and her friends go for a swimming lesson with Miss Rabbit. However, her own sister Mummy Rabbit can't swim, so she is given a lesson as well.
378	62	"Cruise Ship Holiday"	Channel 5	20 February 2023 (Channel 5); 5 June 2023 (Nick Jr.)	TBA
Peppa and George go on a cruise with Granny and Grandpa Pig. It's supposed to be relaxing, but Peppa and Grandpa Pig get lost.
379	63	"Holiday on the Sea"	Channel 5	21 February 2023 (Channel 5); 6 June 2023 (Nick Jr.)	TBA
There are lots of activities to do on the cruise, like breakfast at the pirate cafe.
380	64	"Tropical Day Trip"	Channel 5	22 February 2023 (Channel 5); 7 June 2023 (Nick Jr.)	TBA
The cruise visits an island where the family buy lots of souvenirs. Peppa calls home and tells Goldie about everything! Back on the ship, they end the day eating spaghetti on deck.
381	65	"Sailing Home"	Channel 5	23 February 2023 (Channel 5); 8 June 2023 (Nick Jr.)	TBA
On the final cruise day, the kids help a sad Pirate Pete find Mrs Mermaid.

=== Series 8 (2023–2025) ===
No. overall	No. in series	Title	Premiere	Written by	Original release date	DVD reference
382	1	"Grandpa's Robot"	Discovery Kids (Latin America)	Unknown	4 September 2023 (Discovery Kids Latin America); 17 June 2024 (Nickelodeon)	TBA
During a visit to Granny and Grandpa Pig's house, Peppa and George discover that Grandpa's new robot can help with the household chores and even make juice.
383	2	"Paper Games"	Discovery Kids (Latin America)	Unknown	4 September 2023 (Discovery Kids Latin America); 17 June 2024 (Nickelodeon)	TBA
The Playgroup learns how to use paper in fun ways.
384	3	"Clouds"	Discovery Kids (Latin America)	Unknown	5 September 2023 (Discovery Kids Latin America); 19 March 2024 (Nickelodeon)	TBA
Dark clouds keep blocking out the sun on Peppa and George's trip to the beach.
385	4	"Mr. Bull Digs Up The River"	Discovery Kids (Latin America)	Unknown	5 September 2023 (Discovery Kids Latin America); 20 March 2024 (Nickelodeon)	TBA
Peppa, George, and Grandpa Pig see Mr. Bull using his digger in the river, and discover what should be and what shouldn't be in a river.
386	5	"Granny Sheep Moves In"	Discovery Kids (Latin America)	Phil Hall & Matilda Tristam	6 September 2023 (Discovery Kids Latin America); 17 June 2024 (Nickelodeon)	TBA
Granny Sheep moves into Suzy Sheep's attic, and things prove to be quite confusing!
387	6	"Cardboard Boxes"	Discovery Kids (Latin America)	Phil Hall & Matilda Tristam	6 September 2023 (Discovery Kids Latin America); 17 June 2024 (Nickelodeon)	TBA
Granny Sheep takes Peppa and Suzy to an imaginative world by using cardboard boxes to create pretend locations.
388	7	"Clubhouse Takeaway"	Discovery Kids (Latin America)	Phil Hall & Matilda Tristam	7 September 2023 (Discovery Kids Latin America); 11 March 2024 (Nickelodeon)	TBA
In the clubhouse, Peppa and her friends create a pretend fast-food takeaway.
389	8	"Walkie-Talkies"	Discovery Kids (Latin America)	Phil Hall	7 September 2023 (Discovery Kids Latin America); 11 March 2024 (Nickelodeon)	TBA
Peppa and George learn how to use code names when talking with walkie-talkies. When PC Panda overhears a "Pirate Hog" and "Jolly Face" through his own walkie talkie, he wonders what those could be...
390	9	"Peppa's Office"	Discovery Kids (Latin America)	Phil Hall & Matilda Tristam	8 September 2023 (Discovery Kids Latin America); 12 March 2024 (Nickelodeon)	TBA
Inspired by Mummy Pig and Daddy Pig's office work, Peppa decides to have an office of her own. It may be small, but it's perfect for her.
391	10	"Little Swift"	Discovery Kids (Latin America)	Phil Hall & Jen Upton	8 September 2023 (Discovery Kids Latin America); 21 March 2024 (Nickelodeon)	TBA
Peppa and family learn about a bird called a "Swift".
392	11	"What Babies Do"	Discovery Kids (Latin America)	Phil Hall	11 September 2023 (Discovery Kids Latin America); 13 March 2024 (Nickelodeon)	TBA
Peppa thinks she can look after Baby Alexander well.
393	12	"Lenses"	Discovery Kids (Latin America)	Phil Hall	11 September 2023 (Discovery Kids Latin America); 14 March 2024 (Nickelodeon)	TBA
Peppa accidentally gives Penny Polar Bear and Pedro Pony each other's glasses, and now they have trouble seeing properly.
394	13	"Igloo"	Discovery Kids (Latin America)	Phil Hall	12 September 2023 (Discovery Kids Latin America); 18 March 2024 (Nickelodeon)	TBA
Penny Polar Bear is impressed with the igloo that Peppa and George have built in the snow.
395	14	"Mr. Bull is Getting Married!"	Cinemas	Phil Hall	8 February 2024 (United Kingdom); 25 March 2024 (Nickelodeon)	TBA
Peppa finds out from Mr. Bull that he is marrying Mrs. Cow.
396	15	"Getting Ready for the Wedding!"	Cinemas	Phil Hall	8 February 2024 (United Kingdom); 26 March 2024 (Nickelodeon)	TBA
Peppa and her friends help prepare for Mr. Bull and Mrs. Cow's wedding.
397	16	"Wedding Day!"	Cinemas	Phil Hall	8 February 2024 (United Kingdom); 27 March 2024 (Nickelodeon)	TBA
The big day has arrived at last. Mr. Bull and Mrs. Cow are finally about to be newlyweds!
398	17	"Party Bus"	Cinemas	Phil Hall & Jen Upton	8 February 2024 (United Kingdom); 28 March 2024 (Nickelodeon)	TBA
Peppa goes to Candy Cat's birthday party, which is happening on a special party bus!
399	18	"Movie Night"	Cinemas	Phil Hall & Maris P.	8 February 2024 (United Kingdom); 18 June 2024 (Nickelodeon)	TBA
Peppa and her friends go to Penny Polar Bear's House to watch Super Potato Movie 2.
400	19	"Art House Day"	Cinemas	Phil Hall & Matilda Tristam	8 February 2024 (United Kingdom); 19 June 2024 (Nickelodeon)	TBA
Granny Sheep and Granny Pig take Peppa and Suzy to an art exhibition.
401	20	"Wildflower Wood"	Cinemas	Phil Hall & Matilda Tristam	8 February 2024 (United Kingdom); 17 October 2024 (Nickelodeon)	TBA
The playgroup goes out to see some wildflowers.
402	21	"Racquet Games"	Cinemas	Unknown	8 February 2024 (United Kingdom); 22 October 2024 (Nickelodeon)	TBA
Peppa goes to the tennis centre and learns about the various types of games you can play with a racquet.
403	22	"Sunny Day Games"	Cinemas	Phil Hall	8 February 2024 (United Kingdom); 17 June 2024 (Nickelodeon)	TBA
On a very hot day, Granny and Grandpa show Peppa and George how to create a homemade water slide.
404	23	"Magic Trick"	Cinemas	Phil Hall & Ishai Rabid	8 February 2024 (United Kingdom); 20 June 2024 (Nickelodeon)	TBA
Daddy Pig helps out with the magic show at Emily Elephant's birthday party.
405	24	"Jumping Stick"	Cinemas	Unknown	8 February 2024 (United Kingdom); 21 October 2024 (Nickelodeon)	TBA
Daddy Pig receives a jumping stick in the mail. Peppa tries it out, but finds it quite difficult.
406	25	"Adventure Caravan"	Discovery Kids Latin America	Phil Hall & Jen Upton	5 April 2024 (Discovery Kids Latin America); 23 October 2024 (Nickelodeon)	TBA
Peppa and her family start off their caravan holiday getaway.
407	26	"Caravan Friends"	Discovery Kids Latin America	Phil Hall & Jen Upton	5 April 2024 (Discovery Kids Latin America); 24 October 2024 (Nickelodeon)	TBA
On their caravan holiday, Peppa meets a new friend - Birgit Bear.
408	27	"Chloé's Birthday Party"	Nickelodeon	Unknown	8 October 2024 (Nickelodeon)	TBA
Chloé Pig has her birthday party at an outdoor obstacle course area. Everyone, aside from George, has trouble completing it.
409	28	"Broken Party Bus"	Nickelodeon	Unknown	16 October 2024 (Nickelodeon)	TBA
The Party Bus has broken down, so Grampy Rabbit is on the verge of fixing it.
410	29	"Spooky Clubhouse"	Nickelodeon	Unknown	7 October 2024 (Nickelodeon)	TBA
Peppa's friends decorate the clubhouse for Halloween.
411	30	"Living Above the Shops"	Nickelodeon	Unknown	7 April 2025 (Nickelodeon)	TBA
Peppa discovers what living in an apartment is like.
412	31	"Roof Garden"	Nickelodeon	Unknown	8 April 2025 (Nickelodeon)	TBA
Peppa and her friends help create a garden.
413	32	"Moving Day"	Nickelodeon	Unknown	9 April 2025 (Nickelodeon)	TBA
When Emily Elephant's Granny moves out of the apartments, new neighbours will move in, those who Peppa has met before.
414	33	"Everybody Sleepover"	Nickelodeon	Unknown	10 April 2025 (Nickelodeon)	TBA
Peppa and her friends have sleepovers in the apartments.
415	34	"Walking Bus"	Nickelodeon	Unknown	10 October 2024 (Nickelodeon)	TBA
The children are being taken to school by a "Walking Bus", where they make their own sounds and drive.
416	35	"Happily Ever After"	Nickelodeon	Unknown	9 October 2024 (Nickelodeon)	TBA
When a page in Madame Gazelle's book goes missing, the children take it to create their own endings to the story.
417	36	"Singing Lesson"	Nickelodeon	Moya O'Shea & Phil Hall	14 October 2024 (Nickelodeon)	TBA
At playgroup, the children have a singing lesson to prepare for the big singing competition.
418	37	"Singing Competition"	Nickelodeon	Moya O'Shea & Phil Hall	15 October 2024 (Nickelodeon)	TBA
It's the night of the big singing competition, and the kids are judging.
419	38	"Thanksgiving"	Nick Jr.	Unknown	9 November 2024 (Nick Jr.)	TBA
When Auntie Dottie comes to visit, Mummy Pig decides to hold a Thanksgiving celebration for her.
420	39	"Christmas Cards"	Nick Jr.	Unknown	14 December 2024 (Nick Jr.)	TBA
Peppa's playgroup decides to make a Christmas Card for Father Christmas as gratitude for what he does.
421	40	"Larenzo Lion"	Nickelodeon	Unknown	22 April 2025 (Nickelodeon)	TBA
Peppa meets a new friend who lives inside the Zoo!
422	41	"Dinosaurs Alive"	Nickelodeon	Unknown	21 April 2025 (Nickelodeon)	TBA
Peppa's playgroup visit the Zoo and look at creatures similar to those of dinosaurs.
423	42	"Being Babies"	Nickelodeon	Unknown	31 March 2025 (Nickelodeon)	TBA
After seeing the attention Rosie and Robbie Rabbit get, Peppa and Rebecca pretend to be babies.
424	43	"Mr. Cat's Cafe"	Nickelodeon	Unknown	1 April 2025 (Nickelodeon)	TBA
Peppa visits the cafe below the apartments that is run by Candy Cat's father, Mr. Cat.
425	44	"Cushion Den"	Nickelodeon	Unknown	16 April 2025 (Nickelodeon)	TBA
Peppa, George and Daddy Pig build a den for Mummy Pig.
426	45	"Staying Up Late"	Nickelodeon	Unknown	3 April 2025 (Nickelodeon)	TBA
When Auntie, Uncle and Chloe Pig come for a visit, Peppa is allowed to stay up and have supper with them.
427	46	"The New TV"	Nickelodeon	Unknown	15 April 2025 (Nickelodeon)	TBA
When their TV breaks, Peppa's family purchase a new one; but it proves to be a bit of a hassle.
428	47	"Indoor Adventure"	Nickelodeon	Unknown	14 April 2025 (Nickelodeon)	TBA
When a storm stops Peppa's plans to have an outdoor adventure, they decide to have all the fun of going outdoors in the house instead.
429	48	"Hot Dry Day"	Nickelodeon	Unknown	24 April 2025 (Nickelodeon)	TBA
On a hot day, Peppa and George help the local animals get cool.
430	49	"Folk Music Band"	Nickelodeon	Unknown	2 April 2025 (Nickelodeon)	TBA
Granny Pig's friends come over to play some folk style music.
431	50	"Calling Kylie"	Nickelodeon	Moya O'Shea & Phil Hall	23 April 2025 (Nickelodeon)	TBA
Peppa wants to call Kylie Kangaroo and learns about the different time zones. When Peppa is asleep, Kylie is awake!
432	51	"House Rules"	Nickelodeon	Unknown	17 April 2025 (Nickelodeon)	TBA
Peppa learns that there are many different kinds of house rules when she visits Suzy and Emily's houses.
433	52	"The Big Announcement"	Nickelodeon	Unknown	6 March 2025 (Rai Yoyo, Italy); 31 March 2025 (Nickelodeon)	TBA
Mummy Pig confirms to Peppa and George that she is having a new baby. Note: This is the first episode to feature Harriette Cox as Peppa Pig.

=== Film (2025) ===
Title	Original channel	Original release date	DVD reference
"Peppa Meets the Baby Cinema Experience"	Cinemas	30 May 2025	TBA
A 64-minute theatrical release composed of "The Big Announcement" (above), and the first nine episodes from Series 9 (as below), plus songs.

=== Series 9 (2025–present) ===
No. overall	No. in series	Title	Premiere	Written by	Original release date	DVD reference
434	1	"Bigger House"	Cinemas	Unknown	30 May 2025 (Cinemas); 4 August 2025 (Nickelodeon)	(Note: Due to Changes in OzTAM and Nielsen Ratings, Programs under A 10-Minute Runtime are No Longer reported.)
With the arrival of the new baby, Mummy Pig decides that they need a bigger house.
435	2	"The Big Build"	Cinemas	Unknown	30 May 2025 (Cinemas); 5 August 2025 (Nickelodeon)	TBA
Daddy Pig helps remodel the house.
436	3	"Decorating"	Cinemas	Unknown	30 May 2025 (Cinemas); 6 August 2025 (Nickelodeon)	TBA
Peppa and George decide on how their new rooms should look.
437	4	"Bigger Car"	Cinemas	Unknown	30 May 2025 (Cinemas); 7 August 2025 (Nickelodeon)	TBA
Daddy Pig gets a larger car to replace their older one, as it lacks any more room for the new arrival.
438	5	"Patchwork Quilt"	Cinemas	Unknown	30 May 2025 (Cinemas); 11 August 2025 (Nickelodeon)	TBA
Peppa and Mummy Pig help make a nice quilt for the baby.
439	6	"Sibling School"	Cinemas	Unknown	30 May 2025 (Cinemas); 11 August 2025 (Nickelodeon)	TBA
Peppa and George visit a special school run by Miss Rabbit on how to look after newborns.
440	7	"Baby's Arrival (Note: Aired as "New Baby" in the United States.)"	Cinemas	Unknown	30 May 2025 (Cinemas); 12 August 2025 (Nickelodeon)	TBA
Mummy Pig is about to give birth to a loving baby girl, and Peppa and George; who are staying with Granny and Grandpa Pig, are excited for the arrival.
441	8	"Baby Name"	Cinemas	Unknown	30 May 2025 (Cinemas); 13 August 2025 (Nickelodeon)	TBA
Peppa sees the new baby for the first time, and tries to think of a good name for her.
442	9	"Holding the Baby"	Cinemas	Unknown	30 May 2025 (Cinemas); 14 August 2025 (Nickelodeon)	TBA
Peppa feels unsure about holding Evie Pig for the first time.
443	10	"Granny Sheep's Art Van"	Nickelodeon	Unknown	17 November 2025 (Nickelodeon)	TBA
444	11	"Being Inspired"	Nickelodeon	Unknown	18 November 2025 (Nickelodeon)	TBA
445	12	"Jigsaw Festival"	Nickelodeon	Unknown	19 November 2025 (Nickelodeon)	TBA
446	13	"Hobbies"	Nickelodeon	Unknown	20 November 2025 (Nickelodeon)	TBA
447	14	"Penny Polar Bear's Party"	Nickelodeon	Unknown	24 November 2025 (Nickelodeon)	TBA
448	15	"The Biggest Picture in the World"	Nickelodeon	Unknown	25 November 2025 (Nickelodeon)	TBA
449	16	"Martial Arts"	Nickelodeon	Unknown	26 November 2025 (Nickelodeon)	TBA
450	17	"Doctor Hamster's Ant Farm"	Nickelodeon	Unknown	27 November 2025 (Nickelodeon)	TBA
451	18	"Hearing Test"	Channel 5	Unknown	9 March 2026 (Channel 5); 23 March 2026 (Nickelodeon)	TBA
Peppa and George have a hearing test, where George finds out he is moderately deaf in one of his ears and needs a hearing aid.
452	19	"Favourite Sound"	Channel 5	Unknown	10 March 2026 (Channel 5); 24 March 2026 (Nickelodeon)	TBA
Peppa helps George discover the different sounds now that he has a hearing aid.
453	20	"Hospital Sleepover"	Channel 5	Unknown	11 March 2026 (Channel 5); 25 March 2026 (Nickelodeon)	TBA
Peppa is out with Grandpa Pig cleaning his boat, but it soon turns around when he drops an anchor on his foot.
454	21	"Caring for Grandpa Pig"	Channel 5	Unknown	12 March 2026 (Channel 5); 26 March 2026 (Nickelodeon)	TBA
Grandpa Pig is sad to be in the hospital, but thankfully, Granny Pig, Peppa and her family are there to care for him.
455	22	"Duck Race!"	Nickelodeon	Unknown	2 April 2026	TBA
456	23	"Grown-Up Playground"	Nickelodeon	Unknown	1 April 2026	TBA
Peppa and her friends find out about outdoor gyms.
457	24	"Run Daddy Run!"	Nickelodeon	Unknown	30 March 2026	TBA
Daddy Pig decides to train to compete in the London Marathon.
458	25	"Coach Peppa"	Nickelodeon	Unknown	30 March 2026	TBA
Peppa continues to help out Daddy Pig with his training.
459	26	"The London Marathon"	Nickelodeon	Unknown	31 March 2026	TBA
It's the day of the London Marathon, and the family are cheering Daddy Pig on.

== Peppa Pig Tales (2022–present) ==
Peppa Pig Tales episodes are uploaded weekly on Saturdays on YouTube. These have a different voice cast for the characters.

=== Series 1 (2022–2023) ===
No. in series	Title	Written by	Original release date
1	"Nappy Change"	Tom Gidman & Ryan Denham	29 October 2022
2	"Football Game"	Tom Gidman & Ryan Denham	30 October 2022
3	"Plane Ride"	Jessica Silcock, Naomi Smith & Ryan Denham	5 November 2022
4	"Football Referee"	Jessica Silcock, Naomi Smith & Ryan Denham	6 November 2022
5	"Happy Thanksgiving"	Bita Joudaki & Ryan Denham	11 November 2022
6	"Road Safety"	Bita Joudaki & Ryan Denham	12 November 2022
7	"Fireworks"	Ryan Denham	18 November 2022
8	"Hot and Cold"	Ryan Denham	19 November 2022
9	"Pillow Fort"	Bita Joudaki & Ryan Denham	25 November 2022
10	"Football Party"	Tom Gidman & Ryan Denham	26 November 2022
11	"Snorkelling"	Ryan Denham	2 December 2022
12	"Christmas with Baby Alexander"	Jessica Silcock, Naomi Smith & Ryan Denham	3 December 2022
13	"Sports Day at Playgroup"	Bita Joudaki & Ryan Denham	9 December 2022
14	"Christmas Lunch"	Tom Gidman & Ryan Denham	10 December 2022
15	"Mystery Box"	Ryan Denham	16 December 2022
16	"Board Games"	Jessica Silcock, Naomi Smith & Ryan Denham	17 December 2022
17	"Christmas Tree"	Ryan Denham	23 December 2022
18	"Snow Monster"	Jessica Silcock, Naomi Smith & Ryan Denham	24 December 2022
19	"New Years Eve"	Bita Joudaki & Ryan Denham	30 December 2022
20	"New Years Resolution"	Tom Gidman & Ryan Denham	31 December 2022
21	"Back to School"	Ryan Denham	6 January 2023
22	"Fruit and Veg Scavenger Hunt"	Bita Joudaki & Ryan Denham	7 January 2023
23	"Vending Machine"	Tom Gidman & Ryan Denham	13 January 2023
24	"Backwards Day"	Jessica Silcock, Naomi Smith & Ryan Denham	14 January 2023
25	"Duckpond Diversion"	Tom Gidman & Ryan Denham	5 February 2023
26	"Valentines Pizza"	Jessica Silcock, Naomi Smith & Ryan Denham	6 February 2023
27	"Valentines Surprise"	Ryan Denham	12 February 2023
28	"American Football"	Bita Joudaki & Ryan Denham	13 February 2023
29	"Big Bug Museum"	Ryan Denham	17 February 2023
30	"Pancake Day"	Bita Joudaki & Ryan Denham	18 February 2023
31	"Colour Changing Game"	Ryan Denham	24 February 2023
32	"Magic Story"	Jessica Silcock, Naomi Smith & Ryan Denham	25 February 2023
33	"Hedgehog"	Ryan Denham	3 March 2023
34	"Bees"	Bita Joudaki & Ryan Denham	4 March 2023
35	"Slide Race"	Ryan Denham	10 March 2023
36	"Toilet Trail"	Jessica Silcock & Naomi Smith	11 March 2023
37	"Cars, Buses and Trains"	Jessica Silcock & Naomi Smith	17 March 2023
38	"Baby Bumps"	Ryan Denham	18 March 2023
39	"Arts and Crafts"	Bita Joudaki	24 March 2023
40	"Sleepover at the Museum"	Tom Gidman	25 March 2023
41	"April Fools Day"	Bita Joudaki	31 March 2023
42	"Jokes and Pranks"	Tom Gidman	1 April 2023
43	"Sort the Rubbish"	Ryan Denham	7 April 2023
44	"Easter"	Jessica Silcock & Naomi Smith	8 April 2023
45	"Baby Alexander Visits Playgroup"	Ryan Denham	14 April 2023
46	"Cops and Robbers"	Jessica Silcock & Naomi Smith	15 April 2023
47	"Superhero School"	Bita Joudaki	21 April 2023
48	"Vegetables on the Moon"	Ryan Denham	22 April 2023
49	"Cinco de Mayo"	Bita Joudaki	5 May 2023
50	"King of the Playgroup"	Ryan Denham	6 May 2023
51	"Seesaw Time"	Ryan Denham	12 May 2023
52	"Transportation"	Ryan Denham	13 May 2023

=== Series 2 (2023) ===
No. in series	Title	Written by	Original release date
1	"Getting Dressed"	Tom Gidman	19 May 2023
2	"Packing a Picnic"	Bita Joudaki	20 May 2023
3	"Takeaway"	Jessica Silcock & Naomi Smith	26 May 2023
4	"Garden Den"	Ryan Denham	27 May 2023
5	"Go Karts"	Jessica Silcock & Naomi Smith	2 June 2023
6	"Fishing Trip"	Bita Joudaki	3 June 2023
7	"Dentist for the Day"	Unknown	9 June 2023
8	"Boat Race"	Unknown	10 June 2023
9	"Volcano Science"	Unknown	16 June 2023
10	"Arcade Fever"	Unknown	17 June 2023
11	"Underground"	Unknown	23 June 2023
12	"Bowling Party"	Unknown	24 June 2023
13	"Obstacle Course"	Unknown	30 June 2023
14	"Independence Day"	Unknown	1 July 2023
15	"Shuffleboard"	Unknown	7 July 2023
16	"Cruise Ship Captain"	Unknown	8 July 2023
17	"World Emoji Day"	Unknown	14 July 2023
18	"Juice Factory"	Unknown	15 July 2023
19	"Buffet Restaurant"	Unknown	21 July 2023
20	"Water Games"	Unknown	22 July 2023
21	"Cameras"	Jessica Silcock & Naomi Smith	28 July 2023
22	"Concert"	Ryan Denham	29 July 2023
23	"Airshow"	Bita Joudaki	4 August 2023
24	"Shoe Shop"	Tom Gidman	5 August 2023
25	"Very Long Story"	Bita Joudaki	11 August 2023
26	"Ice Cream Sundaes"	Jessica Silcock & Naomi Smith	12 August 2023
27	"Sleep Over"	Tom Gidman	18 August 2023
28	"Yoga"	Ryan Denham	19 August 2023
29	"Picture Day"	Ryan Denham	25 August 2023
30	"Fun House"	Bita Joudaki	26 August 2023
31	"Spa Day"	Tom Gidman	1 September 2023
32	"Tacos"	Jessica Silcock & Naomi Smith	2 September 2023
33	"Prizes"	Jessica Silcock & Naomi Smith	8 September 2023
34	"Magic Show"	Tom Gidman	9 September 2023
35	"Play Dates"	Ryan Denham	16 September 2023
36	"Toyland Giants"	Tom Gidman	22 September 2023
37	"Muddy Race"	Bita Joudaki	29 September 2023
38	"Scooter Lesson"	Bita Joudaki	6 October 2023
39	"Maze"	Ryan Denham	13 October 2023
40	"Ghost Hunt"	Jessica Silcock & Naomi Smith	20 October 2023
41	"Halloween Costumes"	Jessica Silcock & Naomi Smith	21 October 2023
42	"Tricky Treats"	Bita Joudaki	27 October 2023
43	"The Movies"	Ryan Denham	3 November 2023
44	"Grown Up Jobs"	Jessica Silcock & Naomi Smith	4 November 2023
45	"Charity Shop"	Bita Joudaki	10 November 2023
46	"Train Sleepover"	Tom Gidman	17 November 2023
47	"The Doctors"	Ryan Denham	18 November 2023
48	"Sweet Shop"	Tom Gidman	24 November 2023
49	"New School Bus"	Jessica Silcock & Naomi Smith	25 November 2023
50	"Toy Shop"	Ryan Denham	1 December 2023
51	"Chocolate Factory"	Tom Gidman	8 December 2023
52	"Christmas Swim at Sea"	Bita Joudaki	15 December 2023

=== Series 3 (2024) ===
No. in series	Title	Written by	Original release date
1	"Train Robbery"	Tom Gidman	5 January 2024
2	"Supermarket Sprint"	Rebecca Hyland	6 January 2024
3	"Celery Stick Falls"	Tom Gidman	12 January 2024
4	"Toy Factory"	Ryan Denham	13 January 2024
5	"Balloons"	Ryan Denham	19 January 2024
6	"Mermaids"	Rebecca Hyland	20 January 2024
7	"Tree House Camp Out"	Ryan Denham	26 January 2024
8	"Shopping Robot"	Tom Gidman	27 January 2024
9	"Police Car Rescue"	Tom Gidman	2 February 2024
10	"Disco Limo"	Rebecca Hyland	3 February 2024
11	"Carrot Catcher"	Ryan Denham	9 February 2024
12	"Pancake Restaurant"	Jessica Silcock & Naomi Smith	10 February 2024
13	"Fairy Tales"	Jessica Silcock & Naomi Smith	16 February 2024
14	"Granny Pig's Messy Birthday Party"	Rebecca Hyland	17 February 2024
15	"All Fall Down"	Jessica Silcock & Naomi Smith	23 February 2024
16	"Surprise Lift"	Ryan Denham	24 February 2024
17	"Sandwich Shop"	Jessica Silcock & Naomi Smith	1 March 2024
18	"Bouncy Maze"	Jessica Silcock & Naomi Smith	2 March 2024
19	"Mother's Day Breakfast"	Rebecca Hyland	8 March 2024
20	"Secret Room"	Ryan Denham	9 March 2024
21	"Slime Race"	Tom Gidman	15 March 2024
22	"Refill Station"	Tom Gidman	16 March 2024
23	"Karate Class"	Rebecca Hyland	22 March 2024
24	"Catch The Bunny"	Jessica Silcock & Naomi Smith	23 March 2024
25	"Cake Pranks"	Jessica Silcock & Naomi Smith	29 March 2024
26	"Video Call"	Tom Gidman	4 April 2024
27	"Red Light, Green Light"	Rebecca Hyland	5 April 2024
28	"Ducks In Tinyland"	Jessica Silcock & Naomi Smith	11 April 2024
29	"Peppa's Tie Dye"	Jessica Silcock & Naomi Smith	12 April 2024
30	"Fancy Bathroom"	Tom Gidman	18 April 2024
31	"Whooshing Watering Cans"	Tom Gidman	19 April 2024
32	"Ice Lollies"	Rebecca Hyland	25 April 2025
33	"Space Party"	Jessica Silcock & Naomi Smith	26 April 2024
34	"Sticky Notes"	Tom Gidman	2 May 2024
35	"Airport"	Rebecca Hyland	3 May 2024
36	"Delivered"	Ryan Denham	9 May 2024
37	"The Calm Room"	Jessica Silcock & Naomi Smith	10 May 2024
38	"Lost In The Movie Theatre"	Rebecca Hyland	16 May 2024
39	"Prehistoric George"	Ryan Denham	17 May 2024
40	"Toothpaste"	Tom Gidman	23 May 2024
41	"Playground Dig"	Tom Gidman	24 May 2024
42	"Romantic Dinner"	Tom Gidman	30 May 2024
43	"Jail"	Jessica Silcock & Naomi Smith	31 May 2024
44	"Pottery Class"	Tom Gidman	6 June 2024
45	"Quack, Quack, Honk!"	Rebecca Hyland	7 June 2024
46	"Growing Up"	Tom Gidman	13 June 2024
47	"Muddy Puddle Mystery"	Ryan Denham	14 June 2024
48	"Climb!"	Rebecca Hyland	20 June 2024
49	"The Great Alien Invasion"	Unknown	21 June 2024
50	"Hide and Seek in The Garden"	Ryan Denham	27 June 2024
51	"The Rocket Ride"	Tom Gidman	28 June 2024
52	"Garage Games"	Jessica Silcock & Naomi Smith	4 July 2024

=== Series 4 (2024–2025) ===
No. in series	Title	Written by	Original release date
1	"Muddy Slide"	Rebecca Hyland	8 July 2024
2	"Experiments"	Jessica Silcock & Naomi Smith	14 July 2024
3	"Super Peppa"	Jessica Silcock & Naomi Smith	15 July 2024
4	"Very French Breakfast"	Rebecca Hyland	21 July 2024
5	"Sandy Island"	Ryan Denham	22 July 2024
6	"Surf 'n' Skate"	Ryan Denham	28 July 2024
7	"Iced Lolly Surprise"	Tom Gidman	29 July 2024
8	"Blowup Splash Course"	Jessica Silcock & Naomi Smith	4 August 2024
9	"Bad Mitten"	Ryan Denham	5 August 2024
10	"Sushi Train"	Tom Gidman	11 August 2024
11	"Baby Food"	Rebecca Hyland	12 August 2024
12	"Splash Battle"	Ryan Denham	18 August 2024
13	"Dance Party Bus"	Ryan Denham	19 August 2024
14	"First Aid"	Rebecca Hyland	25 August 2024
15	"Peppa's Cardboard Castle"	Jessica Silcock & Naomi Smith	26 August 2024
16	"Agents & Spies"	Tom Gidman	1 September 2024
17	"Fancy Splashy Garden Party"	Rebecca Hyland	2 September 2024
18	"Mystery Drinks"	Tom Gidman	8 September 2024
19	"Peppa vs George"	Jessica Silcock & Naomi Smith	9 September 2024
20	"Little Robot"	Ryan Denham	15 September 2024
21	"Game Night"	Jessica Silcock & Naomi Smith	16 September 2024
22	"Cabin Pressure"	Ryan Denham	22 September 2024
23	"School Shopping"	Ryan Denham	23 September 2024
24	"Daddy's New Glasses"	Rebecca Hyland	29 September 2024
25	"Tidy Up"	Tom Gidman	30 September 2024
26	"Noisy Nightmare"	Ryan Denham	6 October 2024
27	"Dirt Blaster"	Gretchen Mallorie	7 October 2024
28	"Trick Or Treat"	Ryan Denham	13 October 2024
29	"Pasta Bar"	Tom Gidman	14 October 2024
30	"Donations Day"	Jessica Silcock & Naomi Smith	20 October 2024
31	"Mystery Hide-Out"	Jessica Silcock & Naomi Smith	21 October 2024
32	"Spooky Funhouse"	Gretchen Mallorie	27 October 2024
33	"Electic Car"	Tom Gidman	28 October 2024
34	"Halloween Mummies"	Ryan Denham	3 November 2024
35	"Fridgey Friend"	Gretchen Mallorie	4 November 2024
36	"Sick Day"	Tom Gidman	10 November 2024
37	"DIY"	Ryan Denham	11 November 2024
38	"Peppa's Tropical Island Adventure"	Jessica Silcock & Naomi Smith	17 November 2024
39	"Ready, Set, Bake"	Ryan Denham	18 November 2024
40	"Drive-Thru"	Jessica Silcock & Naomi Smith	24 November 2024
41	"Video Diary"	Ryan Denham	25 November 2024
42	"Wonder Skates"	Ryan Denham & Gretchen Mallorie	1 December 2024
43	"Movie Night"	Jessica Silcock & Naomi Smith	7 December 2024
44	"Tooth Ache"	Gretchen Mallorie	8 December 2024
45	"Box Fort Maze"	Tom Gidman	14 December 2024
46	"Christmas Shopping"	Ryan Denham	15 December 2024
47	"Visiting Santa"	Ryan Denham	21 December 2024
48	"Peppa's Hotel"	Ryan Denham	22 December 2024
49	"Naughty Or Nice"	Tom Gidman	28 December 2024
50	"Mystery Gift"	Gretchen Mallorie	29 December 2024
51	"Santas Workshop"	Jessica Silcock & Naomi Smith	4 January 2025
52	"Playing Games"	Gretchen Mallorie	5 January 2025

=== Series 5 (2025) ===
No. in series	Title	Written by	Original release date
1	"Train Station"	Ryan Denham	11 January 2025
2	"Around The World Food"	Tom Gidman	12 January 2025
3	"Secret Restaurant"	Jessica Silcock & Naomi Smith	18 January 2025
4	"Sleepover Party"	Ryan Denham	19 January 2025
5	"Mystery Sweets"	Tom Gidman	25 January 2025
6	"Chinese Restaurant Buffet"	Gretchen Mallorie	26 January 2025
7	"Really Big Shop"	Tom Gidman	1 February 2025
8	"Popcorn Machine"	Ryan Denham	2 February 2025
9	"Valentines Day"	Ryan Denham	8 February 2025
10	"Tunnel Of Love"	Jessica Silcock & Naomi Smith	9 February 2025
11	"Dress Up Day"	Alison Ray	15 February 2025
12	"Fondue"	Jeremy Krause	16 February 2025
13	"Mummy Mischief Returns!"	Tom Gidman	22 February 2025
14	"So Much Music"	Ryan Denham	23 February 2025
15	"Pancake Festival"	Tom Gidman	28 February 2025
16	"Fixing The Party Bus"	Jessica Silcock & Naomi Smith	1 March 2025
17	"Easter Egg Hunt"	Ryan Denham	7 March 2025
18	"Paint Party"	Alison Ray	8 March 2025
19	"A Trip Through Time"	Jessica Silcock & Naomi Smith	14 March 2025
20	"Really Big News"	Ryan Denham	15 March 2025
21	"Japanese Shop"	Tom Gidman	21 March 2025
22	"Even More Mummy's Day"	Alison Ray	22 March 2025
23	"Noisy Treasure Hunt"	Jessica Silcock & Naomi Smith	28 March 2025
24	"Queen Of The Castle"	Tom Gidman	29 March 2025
25	"Cravings"	Alison Ray	4 April 2025
26	"Falling Out"	Ryan Denham	5 April 2025
27	"Island Beach Campout"	Ryan Denham	11 April 2025
28	"Jelly Mission"	Alison Ray	12 April 2025
29	"Coins"	Tom Gidman	18 April 2025
30	"Baby Check"	Jessica Silcock & Naomi Smith	19 April 2025
31	"Safety Centre"	Ryan Denham	25 April 2025
32	"Teamwork Challenge"	Alison Ray	26 April 2025
33	"Dragons By The Dungeons"	Ryan Denham	2 May 2025
34	"Baby Balloon"	Ryan Denham	3 May 2025
35	"Ice Creams vs Smoothies"	Jessica Silcock & Naomi Smith	9 May 2025
36	"Baby Shower"	Tom Gidman	10 May 2025
37	"Doctors And Patients"	Jessica Silcock & Naomi Smith	16 May 2025
38	"Toy Machine"	Ryan Denham	17 May 2025
39	"Camp Colourful"	Alison Ray	23 May 2025
40	"Very Big Slides"	Tom Gidman	24 May 2025
41	"Breakfast-o-matic"	Tom Gidman	30 May 2025
42	"Ultrasound"	Ryan Denham	31 May 2025
43	"It's Finished!"	Alison Ray	6 June 2025
44	"Decorating Day"	Jessica Silcock & Naomi Smith	7 June 2025
45	"All the Doors"	Jessica Silcock & Naomi Smith	13 June 2025
46	"Test Drive"	Tom Gidman	14 June 2025
47	"Evie Day"	Ryan Denham	20 June 2025
48	"Safety First"	Alison Ray	21 June 2025
49	"Cardboard Hospital"	Alison Ray	27 June 2025
50	"Ice Cream Factory"	Tom Gidman	28 June 2025
51	"Evie's Bedtime"	Jessica Silcock & Naomi Smith	4 July 2025
52	"House Warming Party"	Ryan Denham	5 July 2025

== DVD and VHS releases ==
=== New UK DVD releases ===
The following tables list the new DVD releases for the UK. When applicable, the list includes DVDs that are known to be due for release soon. All UK DVD releases are in 16:9 widescreen format.

=== "Primary" DVDs ===
A "Primary DVD" is defined as a DVD that includes at least one episode not previously released on DVD.

Note that in the "list of episodes"

(a) "DVD#" (DVD number) identifies the track number for the episode on the DVD, but is given in a form that is consistent in form with the "DVD reference" in the episode lists (e.g. the episode "Gardening" has a DVD# of 1.09, which is primary DVD Volume 1, episode 9)
(b) "Episode#" (Episode number) identifies the series, and the episode number within the series, of the episode (e.g. "Gardening" has an Episode# of 1.10, which identifies it as Series 1, episode 10).

DVD Volume	DVD Title	Series	No. of episodes	UK first release date	
1	"Muddy Puddles"	1	12	7 February 2005	list of episodes: DVD# / Episode# / Episode title; 1.01 / 1.01 / "Muddy Puddles"; 1.02 / 1.02 / "Mr Dinosaur Is Lost"; 1.03 / 1.04 / "Polly Parrot"; 1.04 / 1.03 / "Best Friend"; 1.05 / 1.05 / "Hide and Seek"; 1.06 / 1.06 / "The Playgroup"; 1.07 / 1.07 / "Mummy Pig at Work"; 1.08 / 1.35 / "Camping"; 1.09 / 1.10 / "Gardening"; 1.10 / 1.12 / "Bicycles"; 1.11 / 1.23 / "The New Car"; 1.12 / 1.26 / "Snow"
2	"Flying a Kite"	1	10	4 July 2005	list of episodes: DVD# / Episode# / Episode title; 2.01 / 1.14 / "Flying a Kite"; 2.02 / 1.28 / "My Cousin Chloé"; 2.03 / 1.09 / "Daddy Loses his Glasses"; 2.04 / 1.11 / "Hiccups"; 2.05 / 1.15 / "Picnic"; 2.06 / 1.21 / "Mummy Pig's Birthday"; 2.07 / 1.18 / "Dressing Up"; 2.08 / 1.20 / "The School Fete"; 2.09 / 1.16 / "Musical Instruments"; 2.10 / 1.30 / "Babysitting"
3	"New Shoes"	1	10	7 November 2005	list of episodes: DVD# / Episode# / Episode title; 3.01 / 1.19 / "New Shoes"; 3.02 / 1.31 / "Ballet Lesson"; 3.03 / 1.22 / "The Tooth Fairy"; 3.04 / 1.24 / "Treasure Hunt"; 3.05 / 1.25 / "Not Very Well"; 3.06 / 1.27 / "Windy Castle"; 3.07 / 1.29 / "Pancakes"; 3.08 / 1.39 / "The Museum"; 3.09 / 1.13 / "Secrets"; 3.10 / 1.32 / "Thunderstorm"
4	"Piggy in the Middle"	1	10	20 March 2006	list of episodes: DVD# / Episode# / Episode title; 4.01 / 1.08 / "Piggy in the Middle"; 4.02 / 1.38 / "Fancy Dress Party"; 4.03 / 1.40 / "Very Hot Day"; 4.04 / 1.47 / "Mister Skinnylegs"; 4.05 / 1.34 / "Lunch"; 4.06 / 1.36 / "The Sleepy Princess"; 4.07 / 1.37 / "The Tree House"; 4.08 / 1.42 / "Daddy Gets Fit"; 4.09 / 1.49 / "Shopping"; 4.10 / 1.41 / "Chloé's Puppet Show"
5	"My Birthday Party"	1	10	23 October 2006	list of episodes: DVD# / Episode# / Episode title; 5.01 / 1.50 / "My Birthday Party"; 5.02 / 1.44 / "The Playground"; 5.03 / 1.43 / "Tidying Up"; 5.04 / 1.17 / "Frogs and Worms and Butterflies"; 5.05 / 1.45 / "Daddy Puts up a Picture"; 5.06 / 1.46 / "At the Beach"; 5.07 / 1.33 / "Cleaning the Car"; 5.08 / 1.48 / "Grandpa Pig's Boat"; 5.09 / 1.51 / "Daddy's Movie Camera"; 5.10 / 1.52 / "School Play"
6	"Bubbles"	2	12	28 May 2007	list of episodes: DVD# / Episode# / Episode title; 6.01 / 2.01 / "Bubbles"; 6.02 / 2.04 / "Teddy's Day Out"; 6.03 / 2.02 / "Emily Elephant"; 6.04 / 2.03 / "Polly's Holiday"; 6.05 / 2.06 / "George's Friend"; 6.06 / 2.05 / "Mysteries"; 6.07 / 2.10 / "Rock Pools"; 6.08 / 2.08 / "Windy Autumn Day"; 6.09 / 2.09 / "The Time Capsule"; 6.10 / 2.07 / "Mr. Scarecrow"; 6.11 / 2.12 / "The Boat Pond"; 6.12 / 2.11 / "Recycling"
7	"Peppa's Christmas"	2	11 (a)	29 October 2007	list of episodes: DVD# / Episode# / Episode title; 7.01 / S.01 / "Peppa's Christmas"; 7.02 / 2.23 / "Pirate Island"; 7.03 / 2.30 / "Cuckoo Clock"; 7.04 / 2.37 / "Pretend Friend"; 7.05 / 2.27 / "The Long Grass"; 7.06 / 2.35 / "The Dentist"; 7.07 / 2.28 / "Zoë Zebra the Postman's Daughter"; 7.08 / 2.40 / "Nature Trail"; 7.09 / 2.41 / "Pen Pal"; 7.10 / 2.38 / "School Bus Trip"; 7.11 / 2.42 / "Granny and Grandpa's Attic"
8	"The Balloon Ride"	2	10	17 March 2008	list of episodes: DVD# / Episode# / Episode title; 8.01 / 2.25 / "The Balloon Ride"; 8.02 / 2.24 / "George Catches a Cold"; 8.03 / 2.39 / "Rebecca Rabbit"; 8.04 / 2.32 / "Grandpa's Little Train"; 8.05 / 2.29 / "Painting"; 8.06 / 2.34 / "Ice Skating"; 8.07 / 2.36 / "Dens"; 8.08 / 2.31 / "The Baby Piggy"; 8.09 / 2.33 / "The Cycle Ride"; 8.10 / 2.26 / "George's Birthday"
9	"Cold Winter Day"	2	11 (a)	27 October 2008	list of episodes: DVD# / Episode# / Episode title; 9.01 / 2.52 / "Cold Winter Day"; 9.02 / 2.21 / "Tiny Creatures"; 9.03 / 2.22 / "Daddy Pig's Office"; 9.04 / 2.15 / "Sports Day"; 9.05 / 2.16 / "The Eye Test"; 9.06 / 2.17 / "Granddad Dog's Garage"; 9.07 / 2.18 / "Foggy Day"; 9.08 / 2.19 / "Jumble Sale"; 9.09 / 2.20 / "Swimming"; 9.10 / 2.14 / "Bedtime"; 9.11 / S.01 / "Peppa's Christmas"
10	"Stars"	2	10	2 March 2009	list of episodes: DVD# / Episode# / Episode title; 10.01 / 2.49 / "Stars"; 10.02 / 2.45 / "School Camp"; 10.03 / 2.44 / "The Toy Cupboard"; 10.04 / 2.43 / "The Quarrel"; 10.05 / 2.46 / "Captain Daddy Pig"; 10.06 / 2.47 / "The Powercut"; 10.07 / 2.13 / "Traffic Jam"; 10.08 / 2.48 / "Bouncy Ball"; 10.09 / 2.50 / "Daddy Pig's Birthday"; 10.10 / 2.51 / "Sleepover"
11	"Princess Peppa and Sir George the Brave"	3	10	26 October 2009	list of episodes: DVD# / Episode# / Episode title; 11.01 / 3.14 / "Princess Peppa"; 11.02 / 3.01 / "Work and Play"; 11.03 / 3.02 / "The Rainbow"; 11.04 / 3.03 / "Pedro's Cough"; 11.05 / 3.04 / "The Library"; 11.06 / 3.05 / "The Camper Van"; 11.07 / 3.06 / "Camping Holiday"; 11.08 / 3.07 / "Compost"; 11.09 / 3.08 / "Richard Rabbit Comes to Play"; 11.10 / 3.09 / "Fun Run"
12	"The Fire Engine" (f)	3	10	29 March 2010	list of episodes: DVD# / Episode# / Episode title; 12.01 / 3.13 / "The Fire Engine"; 12.02 / 3.10 / "Washing"; 12.03 / 3.11 / "Polly's Boat Trip"; 12.04 / 3.12 / "Delphine Donkey"; 12.05 / 3.25 / "Numbers"; 12.06 / 3.22 / "Grandpa at the Playground"; 12.07 / 3.16 / "Danny's Pirate Party"; 12.08 / 3.18 / "The Train Ride"; 12.09 / 3.15 / "Teddy Playgroup"; 12.10 / 3.21 / "A Trip To the Moon"
13	"Santa's Grotto"	3	10	25 October 2010	list of episodes: DVD# / Episode# / Episode title; 13.01 / 3.51 / "Santa's Grotto"; 13.02 / 3.52 / "Santa's Visit"; 13.03 / 3.17 / "Mr. Potato Comes to Town"; 13.04 / 3.19 / "Granny Pig's Chickens"; 13.05 / 3.20 / "Talent Day"; 13.06 / 3.23 / "Goldie the Fish"; 13.07 / 3.24 / "Funfair"; 13.08 / 3.26 / "Digging up the Road"; 13.09 / 3.27 / "Freddy Fox"; 13.10 / 3.30 / "Sun, Sea and Snow"
14	"Potato City"	3 & 4	10	18 April 2011	list of episodes: DVD# / Episode# / Episode title; 14.01 / 4.01 / "Potato City"; 14.02 / 3.28 / "Whistling"; 14.03 / 3.29 / "Doctor Hamster's Tortoise"; 14.04 / 3.31 / "Grandpa Pig's Computer"; 14.05 / 3.32 / "Hospital"; 14.06 / 3.33 / "Spring"; 14.07 / 3.34 / "Miss Rabbit's Helicopter"; 14.08 / 3.35 / "Baby Alexander"; 14.09 / 3.36 / "Grampy Rabbit's Lighthouse"; 14.10 / 3.37 / "Miss Rabbit's Day Off"
15	"International Day"	3 & 4	11	24 October 2011	list of episodes: DVD# / Episode# / Episode title; 15.01 / 4.08 / "International Day"; 15.02 / 3.39 / "Grampy Rabbit's Boatyard"; 15.03 / 3.40 / "Shake, Rattle and Bang"; 15.04 / 3.47 / "Pottery"; 15.05 / 3.43 / "Mr. Fox's Van"; 15.06 / 3.50 / "The Biggest Muddy Puddle in the World"; 15.07 / 3.42 / "Chatterbox"; 15.08 / 3.44 / "Chloé's Big Friends"; 15.09 / 3.49 / "Edmond Elephant's Birthday"; 15.10 / 3.45 / "Gym Class"; 15.11 / 3.48 / "Paper Aeroplanes"
16	"Champion Daddy Pig"	3 & 4	10	26 March 2012	list of episodes: DVD# / Episode# / Episode title; 16.01 / 3.41 / "Champion Daddy Pig"; 16.02 / 3.38 / "The Secret Club"; 16.03 / 4.02 / "The New House"; 16.04 / 4.03 / "Basketball"; 16.05 / 4.04 / "Horsey Twinkle Toes"; 16.06 / 4.05 / "Naughty Tortoise"; 16.07 / 4.07 / "Shadows"; 16.08 / 4.06 / "Mr. Fox's Shop"; 16.09 / 3.46 / "The Blackberry Bush"; 16.10 / 4.10 / "Mummy Rabbit's Bump"
17	"The Queen: A Royal Compilation" (b)	1, 3 & 4	12	21 May 2012	list of episodes: DVD# / Episode# / Episode title; 17.01 / 4.27 / "The Queen" (new episode); 17.02 / 3.14 / "Princess Peppa"; 17.03 / 1.50 / "My Birthday Party"; 17.04 / 3.20 / "Talent Day"; 17.05 / 3.16 / "Danny's Pirate Party"; 17.06 / 1.24 / "Treasure Hunt"; 17.07 / 1.38 / "Fancy Dress Party"; 17.08 / 1.21 / "Mummy Pig's Birthday"; 17.09 / 1.52 / "School Play"; 17.10 / 1.36 / "The Sleepy Princess"; / / and, from Ben and Holly's Little Kingdom; 17.11 / 1.26 / "Queen Holly"; 17.12 / 1.06 / "The Frog Prince"
18	"Christmas Show"	4	10	29 October 2012	list of episodes: DVD# / Episode# / Episode title; 18.01 / 4.25 / "Mr. Potato's Christmas Show"; 18.02 / 4.09 / "The Rainy Day Game"; 18.03 / 4.11 / "Pedro the Cowboy"; 18.04 / 4.13 / "The Flying Vet"; 18.05 / 4.14 / "Kylie Kangaroo"; 18.06 / 4.16 / "Grampy Rabbit's Dinosaur Park"; 18.07 / 4.15 / "Captain Daddy Dog"; 18.08 / 4.12 / "Peppa and George's Garden"; 18.09 / 4.17 / "Bedtime Story"; 18.10 / 4.18 / "Lost Keys"
19	"The Holiday"	4	11	25 March 2013	list of episodes: DVD# / Episode# / Episode title; 19.01 / 4.36 / "Flying on Holiday"; 19.02 / 4.37 / "The Holiday House"; 19.03 / 4.38 / "Holiday in the Sun"; 19.04 / 4.39 / "The End of the Holiday"; 19.05 / 4.19 / "George's New Dinosaur"; 19.06 / 4.20 / "Grandpa Pig's Train to the Rescue"; 19.07 / 4.21 / "The Pet Competition"; 19.08 / 4.22 / "Spider Web"; 19.09 / 4.23 / "The Noisy Night"; 19.10 / 4.24 / "The Wishing Well"; 19.11 / 4.26 / "Madame Gazelle's Leaving Party"
20	"A Christmas Compilation" (c)	1, 2, 3 & 4	10	11 November 2013	list of episodes: DVD# / Episode# / Episode title; 20.01 / 4.49 / "Snowy Mountain" (new episode); 20.02 / 1.26 / "Snow"; 20.03 / S.01 / "Peppa's Christmas"; 20.04 / 2.08 / "Windy Autumn Day"; 20.05 / 2.34 / "Ice Skating"; 20.06 / 2.52 / "Cold Winter Day"; 20.07 / 3.30 / "Sun, Sea and Snow"; 20.08 / 3.51 / "Santa's Grotto"; 20.09 / 3.52 / "Santa's Visit"; 20.10 / 4.25 / "Mr. Potato's Christmas Show"
21	"Peppa's Circus"	4	10	7 April 2014	list of episodes: DVD# / Episode# / Episode title; 21.01 / 4.47 / "Peppa's Circus"; 21.02 / 4.28 / "Desert Island"; 21.03 / 4.29 / "Perfume"; 21.04 / 4.31 / "The Aquarium"; 21.05 / 4.32 / "George's Racing Car"; 21.06 / 4.33 / "The Little Boat"; 21.07 / 4.50 / "Grampy Rabbit in Space"; 21.08 / 4.35 / "Night Animals"; 21.09 / 4.40 / "Mirrors"; 21.10 / 4.41 / "Pedro is Late"
22	"The Golden Boots" (d)	S2, 4	4 (d)	20 July 2015	list of episodes: DVD# / Episode# / Episode title; 22.01 / S2 / "The Golden Boots"; 22.02 / 4.30 / "The Children's Fete"; 22.03 / 4.46 / "George's Balloon"; 22.04 / 4.42 / "Garden Games"
23	"Peppa Pig's Pumpkin Party" (e)	S3, 4	10	5 October 2015	list of episodes: DVD# / Episode# / Episode title; 23.01 / S3 / "Pumpkin Party"; 23.02 / 4.48 / "The Fish Pond"; 23.03 / 4.52 / "Pirate Treasure"; 23.04 / 4.34 / "The Sandpit"; 23.05 / 4.51 / "The Olden Days"; 23.06 / 4.45 / "Fruit"; 23.07 / 4.44 / "Mr. Bull in a China Shop"; 23.08 / 4.43 / "Going Boating"; / / and, from Ben and Holly's Little Kingdom; 23.09 / 1.15 / "Mrs. Witch"; 23.10 / 1.13 / "Nanny Plum's Lesson"
24	"Gerald Giraffe"	5	6	13 February 2017	list of episodes: DVD# / Episode# / Episode title; 24.01 / 5.06 / "Gerald Giraffe"; 24.02 / 5.01 / "Pretend Playing"; 24.03 / 5.02 / "Castle"; 24.04 / 5.03 / "Miss Rabbit's Taxi"; 24.05 / 5.04 / "Scooters"; 24.06 / 5.05 / "Pumpkin Competition"
25	"My First Cinema Experience" (g)	5	9	16 October 2017	list of episodes: DVD# / Episode# / Episode title; 25.01 / 5.15 / "London"; 25.02 / 5.16 / "The Police"; 25.03 / 5.18 / "Canal Boat"; 25.04 / 5.17 / "The Zoo"; 25.05 / 5.19 / "The Outback"; 25.06 / 5.20 / "Surfing"; 25.07 / 5.21 / "The Great Barrier Reef"; 25.08 / 5.22 / "Boomerang"; 25.09 / 5.14 / "Move to Music"
26	"The Easter Bunny"	5	10	5 March 2018	list of episodes: DVD# / Episode# / Episode title; 26.01 / 5.08 / "Easter Bunny"; 25.02 / 5.13 / "Molly Mole"; 26.03 / 5.09 / "Simple Science"; 26.04 / 5.10 / "School Project"; 25.05 / 5.23 / "Nursery Rhymes"; 25.06 / 5.25 / "Digger World"; 25.07 / 5.12 / "Grandpa Pig's Greenhouse"; 25.08 / 5.29 / "Sailing Boat"; 25.09 / 5.24 / "Masks"; 25.10 / 5.30 / "Soft Play"
27	"When I Grow Up"	5	10	5 November 2018	list of episodes: DVD# / Episode# / Episode title; 27.01 / 5.37 / "When I Grow Up"; 27.02 / 5.34 / "Grandpa Pig's Pond"; 27.03 / 5.35 / "Once Upon a Time"; 27.04 / 5.38 / "The Ambulance"; 27.05 / 5.36 / "Police Station"; 27.06 / 5.39 / "Doctors"; 27.07 / 5.40 / "Super Potato"; 27.08 / 5.33 / "Peppa Goes To Paris"; 27.09 / 5.41 / "Grampy Rabbit's Hovercraft"; 27.10 / 5.32 / "Father Christmas"
28	"The Carnival"	5	10	11 February 2019	list of episodes: DVD# / Episode# / Episode title; 28.01 / 5.43 / "The Carnival"; 28.02 / 5.51 / "Tiny Land"; 28.03 / 5.27 / "Wendy Wolf's Birthday"; 28.04 / 5.07 / "Parachute Jump"; 28.05 / 5.45 / "Caves"; 28.06 / 5.46 / "Grandpa's Toy Plane"; 28.07 / 5.42 / "Playgroup Star"; 28.08 / 5.26 / "The Doll Hospital"; 28.09 / 5.50 / "Suzy Goes Away"; 28.10 / 5.47 / "George's New Clothes"
29	"Festival of Fun" (h)	6	10	14 October 2019	list of episodes: DVD# / Episode# / Episode title; 29.01 / 6.18 / "The Petting Farm"; 29.02 / 6.22 / "Bird Spotting"; 29.03 / 6.23 / "Super Potato Movie"; 29.04 / 6.19 / "Pizza! Pizza!"; 29.05 / 6.16 / "Strawberries"; 29.06 / 6.14 / "Children's Festival"; 29.07 / 6.15 / "Muddy Festival"; 29.08 / 6.20 / "TV Land"; 29.09 / 6.21 / "Roman Day"; 29.10 / 6.17 / "Grandpa Pig's Birthday"
30	"Mandy Mouse"	6	12	17 February 2020	list of episodes: DVD# / Episode# / Episode title; 30.01 / 6.03 / "Mandy Mouse"; 30.02 / 6.07 / "Lots of Muddy Puddles"; 30.03 / 6.01 / "The Panda Twins"; 30.04 / 6.02 / "Chinese New Year"; 30.05 / 6.04 / "Recorders"; 30.06 / 6.05 / "Miss Rabbit's Relaxation Class"; 30.07 / 6.08 / "Father's Day"; 30.08 / 6.09 / "Funny Music"; 30.09 / 6.10 / "Buttercups, Daisies and Dandelions"; 30.10 / 6.11 / "The Marble Run"; 30.11 / 6.12 / "Grandpa Pig's Metal Detector"; 30.12 / 6.13 / "World Book Day"
31	"Peppa's Christmas Visit"	6	12	26 October 2020	list of episodes: DVD# / Episode# / Episode title; 31.01 / 6.26 / "Christmas at the Hospital"; 31.02 / 6.28 / "The Perfect Day"; 31.03 / 6.29 / "Breakfast Club"; 31.04 / 6.30 / "The Botanical Gardens"; 31.05 / 6.31 / "Mr Potato's Fruit and Vegetable Quiz"; 31.06 / 6.32 / "Viking Day"; 31.07 / 6.33 / "Make Up Musical Instruments"; 31.08 / 6.34 / "In the Future"; 31.09 / 6.35 / "Doctor Hamster's Big Present"; 31.10 / 6.36 / "Butterflies"; 31.11 / 6.37 / "Grampy Rabbit's Jetpack"; 31.12 / 6.38 / "Detective Potato"
32	"Valentine's Day"	6	12	25 January 2021	list of episodes: DVD# / Episode# / Episode title; 32.01 / 6.27 / "Valentine's Day"; 32.02 / 6.40 / "Stone Age Granny"; 32.03 / 6.41 / "Space Adventure"; 32.04 / 6.42 / "Fire Station Practice"; 32.05 / 6.43 / "Mr Bull the Teacher"; 32.06 / 6.45 / "Poems"; 32.07 / 6.46 / "Please and Thank You"; 32.08 / 6.47 / "Ice Cream"; 32.09 / 6.48 / "Science Museum"; 32.10 / 6.49 / "Jukebox"; 32.11 / 6.50 / "Windmills"; 32.12 / 6.51 / "Mandy Mouse's Birthday"
33	"Peppa Visits America"	6 & 7	12	6 September 2021	list of episodes: DVD# / Episode# / Episode title; 33.01 / 7.01 / "America"; 33.02 / 7.02 / "The Diner"; 33.03 / 7.03 / "Canyon Country"; 33.04 / 7.04 / "Hollywood"; 33.05 / 7.05 / "Motorbiking"; 33.06 / 7.06 / "Sea Treasure"; 33.07 / 7.08 / "Police Car"; 33.08 / 7.10 / "Rescuing Miss Rabbit"; 33.09 / 6.06 / "Parking Ticket"; 33.10 / 6.44 / "Looking For Things"; 33.11 / 6.39 / "The Electric Car"; 33.12 / 6.52 / "The Sandcastle"

Except as indicated below, all the episodes on a primary DVD are "new to DVD" when the DVD was released.

(a) 10 "regular" episodes, plus the "Peppa's Christmas" special episode (which was a "new to DVD" episode on Volume 7, but not on Volume 9).
(b) No formally assigned volume number, but treated as a "primary" DVD as it contains the first release to DVD of a new Peppa Pig episode ("The Queen"), and the DVDs containing episodes not previously released that were issued immediately before and after this DVD have been given volume references of 16 and 18 respectively. As well as the "Queen" episode, the DVD has 9 other Peppa Pig episodes, which have all been released on earlier Peppa Pig primary DVDs, and two episodes from Ben and Holly's Little Kingdom, which are also on previously released DVDs.
(c) 10 episodes - 9 "regular" episodes plus the "Peppa's Christmas" special episode. Only one of the episodes is new to DVD ("Snowy Mountain"), all the other episodes on the DVD including the special have all been released on earlier Peppa Pig primary DVDs.
(d) As per Amazon UK. There are four episodes on the DVD - "The Golden Boots" special episode, plus 3 "regular" episodes. All the episodes are new to DVD.
(e) All the Peppa Pig episodes new to DVD, but 'Pumpkin Party' was not transmitted in the UK until after the DVD release date.
(f) Some versions of the DVD place "Washing" first, and "The Fire Engine" fourth.
(g) Contains the episodes as seen in the cinema, with title sequences, but without closing credits.
(h) Contains the episodes as seen in the cinema, with title sequences (all bar "Muddy Festival"), but without closing credits (all).

=== "Non-Primary" DVDs ===
These are new DVD releases where the DVD includes only episodes that have already been released to DVD (i.e. it is not a "Primary" DVD). The episodes in these DVDs are included in the DVD Reference field in the main table listings, but with a prefix of "NP" (="Non-Primary").

DVD Volume
DVD Title
Series
No. of episodes
UK first release date

NP1
"10 Years of Muddy Puddles"
1, 2, 3 & 4
10
28 July 2014

list of episodes
DVD#	Episode#	Episode title
1.01	1.01	"Muddy Puddles"
1.02	4.27	"The Queen"
1.03	3.35	"Baby Alexander"
1.04	3.50	"The Biggest Muddy Puddle in the World"
1.05	3.41	"Champion Daddy Pig"
1.06	2.01	"Bubbles"
1.07	2.50	"Daddy Pig's Birthday"
1.08	3.13	"The Fire Engine"
1.09	3.02	"The Rainbow"
1.10	1.28	"My Cousin Chloe"

NP2
"Peppa Pig: Around the World"
1, 2 & 4
4
4 April 2016

list of episodes
DVD#	Episode#	Episode title
2.01	0.04	"Around the World With Peppa"
2.02	4.08	"International Day"
2.03	1.46	"At the Beach"
2.04	2.03	"Polly's Holiday"

=== Other UK DVD releases ===
Most of the primary DVDs have been re-released, either singly or in combination, as follows

UK Release Date	Title	Description
2004	"Muddy Puddles"	1 DVD (Vol. 1)
2005	"Flying a Kite"	1 DVD (Vol. 2)
2005	"New Shoes"	1 DVD (Vol. 3)
2005	"Piggy in the Middle"	1 DVD (Vol. 4)
2006	"My Birthday Party"	1 DVD (Vol. 5)
27 October 2008	"The Peppa Collection"	9 DVDs (Vols. 1 – 9)
7 September 2009	n/a	3 DVD Triple Pack (Vols. 8 – 10)
25 October 2010	n/a	3 DVD Triple Pack (Vols. 7, 11 & 12)
25 October 2010	"The Bumper Collection"	12 DVDs (Vols. 1 – 12)
3 January 2011	n/a	3 DVD Triple Pack (Vols. 1 – 3)
3 January 2011	n/a	3 DVD Triple Pack (Vols. 4 – 6)
3 January 2011	n/a	3 DVD Triple Pack (Vols. 8 – 10)
24 October 2011	"The Christmas Collection"	3 DVD Triple Pack (Vols. 7, 9 & 13)
16 July 2012	"Head Box Set"	6 DVD Box Set (Vols. 1, 5, 6, 8, 10 & 12)
7 October 2013	"Selection Box"	6 DVD Box Set (Vols. 2 - 6 & 14)
29 September 2014	"Christmas Collection"	4 DVD Set (Vols. 7, 9, 13 & 18)
29 September 2014	"Ultimate Collection"	20 DVD Set (Vols. 1 - 19 & 21)
29 September 2014	"Muddy Puddles Collection"	4 Pack DVD Set (Vols. 1 - 3 & 8)

A free Peppa Pig DVD (containing the four episodes "Mummy Pig at Work", "Frogs and Worms and Butterflies", "Secrets" and "Muddy Puddles") was released by the Daily Mirror on 13 September 2006, as part of a children's DVD promotion.

=== UK VHS releases ===
A VHS tape ("Muddy Puddles") was released on 7 February 2005, a VHS tape ("Flying a Kite") was released on 4 July 2005 and a VHS tape ("New Shoes") was released on 7 November 2005 (i.e. the VHS tapes were released on the same dates as the corresponding primary DVDs). A promotional tape ("Polly Parrot") was also released around that time which contained 3 episodes (Polly Parrot, Bicycles and Snow).

=== Non-UK DVD releases ===
1. Volume 1: Muddy Puddles

Released in France as "Cache-Cache" ("Hide And Seek"), in 14:9 format with French-Language soundtrack, and the option to watch in English with French subtitles.
Released in the Netherlands as "Modderpoelen en Andere Verhaaltjes" ("Muddy Puddles and Other Stories"), in 4:3 format with Dutch-language soundtrack.
Released in Germany as "Matschepampe und Weitere Wutzige Geschichten" ("Muddy Puddles and other Piggy Stories"), in 4:3 format with German-language soundtrack, without the episodes "Camping" (1.08), "Bicycles" (1.10), "The New Car" (1.11) and "Snow" (1.12), but with "Picnic" (2.05) and "Piggy in the Middle" (4.01) for unknown reasons.

2. Volume 4

Released in France as "La cabane dans l'arbre (The Tree House)", with the episodes

Grenouilles, vers et papillons (Frogs, Worms and Butterflies)
La cabane dans l'arbre (The Tree House)
Monsieur l'épouvantail (Mister Scarecrow)
La mare aux petits bateaux (The Boat Pond)
Jour de brume (Foggy Day)
Les petites bêtes (Tiny Creatures)
Une promenade à vélo (The Cycle Ride)
Le pique nique (Picnic)
Les bulles (Bubbles)
Vive le camping (School Camp)

== Notes ==
The episode numbering is based on the original (UK) broadcast dates. The US and Australian air dates are only listed if an episode premiered in one of those countries first. The original broadcast dates for series 1 & 2 and the "special" were derived by an analysis across various data sources, in particular:

(a) the Radio Times listings (paper archive)
(b) the Channel 5 episode list
(c) notes on TVThrong
(d) the MSN TV episode list and
(e) the Daily & Sunday Express newspaper archives.
