= Mister Skinnylegs =

- Peppa Pig episode
- Screenshot from the episode showing George encountering Mister Skinnylegs on the bathroom sink
- Episode no.: Series 1 Episode 47
- Written by: Alison Snowden
- Narrated by: John Sparkes
- Original air date: 10 November 2004

Guest appearance
- Hazel Rudd as Mister Skinnylegs

Episode chronology
← Previous "At the Beach"	Next → "Grandpa Pig's Boat"

"Mister Skinnylegs" is the forty-seventh episode of the first season of the British animated preschool children's television series Peppa Pig. It originally aired in the United Kingdom in 2004. The episode sees Peppa Pig overcoming her fear of spiders after her brother George finds one on their bathroom sink. It was banned in Australia in 2012 over safety concerns due to the episode featuring interaction with spiders, since some Australian spiders are dangerously venomous.

== Plot and production ==
The episode begins with Peppa Pig and George Pig arguing over a doll family's actions while playing with a dollhouse in their bedroom: Peppa wants the family to have a tea party, while George wants them to sleep. George eventually concedes to the tea party, and Peppa orders him to go to the bathroom to fill up a teapot with water. While there, he encounters a spider, which he brings back to their bedroom and puts into a miniature bed. A moment later, to Peppa's shock, the spider springs out from under the bed covers, prompting her to frantically run downstairs to their parents, crying for the spider to be removed.

She then follows her father, Daddy Pig, back to the room asking him to take away the spider; he responds that spiders are "very, very small" and that "they can't hurt you". Soon after that, he sees the spider and, horrified by its size, goes to call Mummy Pig upstairs. Following his exit from the room, Peppa suddenly loses her fear and names the spider Mr. Skinnylegs. The parents re-enter the room, and Peppa introduces Mummy Pig to the spider. Mummy Pig is also scared by its size but gains some bravery after witnessing her children play with it. The episode ends with the pig family gathering around the dollhouse and having a pretend tea party.

Like the series's other episodes, "Mister Skinnylegs" was produced and copyrighted by Ashley Baker Davies Ltd. in association with the Contender Entertainment Group and stars Lily Snowden-Fine as Peppa Pig, Oliver May as George Pig, Richard Ridings as Daddy Pig, and Morwenna Banks as Mummy Pig. In the episode, Hazel Rudd voices Mr. Skinnylegs.

== Australian ban ==
After airing on Nick Jr. in Australia in 2012, the episode was banned by the Australian Broadcasting Corporation (ABC) after a parent filed a complaint to the ABC stating that it was "inappropriate for an Australian audience because it said that spiders were not to be feared", since some Australian spider species are dangerously venomous (although as of 2015, no deaths by spider bites had been recorded there since 1981); following the ban, ABC apologised and said it had already restricted the episode from over-the-air broadcasting in Australia and that the publishing of it in 2012 was accidental and due to a "technical problem".

Despite the ban, it again aired in Australia, on Foxtel, on 25 August 2017. Upon seeing the reappearance of the episode, another parent contacted Nickelodeon, which replied that the episode was harmless and that Mr. Skinnylegs "did not look real", refusing to halt its broadcast. After being contacted by the media, a Nickelodeon spokesperson later said that the company had re-evaluated its decision to re-air the episode and that it had pulled it from future rotation in the nation.

Lloyd Farley of Collider wrote in 2023 that while the phrase "don't be afraid of spiders" is generally well-meaning in most of the world, due to Australia's natural variety of spider species, approximately 27 deaths in the 20th century had been attributed to spider bites there. He also said that Mr. Skinnylegs, the spider featured within the episode, appears similar to a male funnel-web spider and could therefore influence children into interacting with the dangerously venomous Australian species.
