= Wide-Eye =

- Genre: Children's series Animated series Comedy
- Written by: Jimmy Hibbert; Diane Redmond; Jan Page; Jo Allen
- Directed by: Neil Fitzgibbon
- Voices of: Anton Rodgers; Jane Horrocks; Maria Darling; Jimmy Hibbert
- Narrated by: Tim Woodward (only in the audiobooks)
- Composer: Keith Hopwood
- Country of origin: United Kingdom
- Original language: English
- No. of series: 1
- No. of episodes: 26

Production
- Executive producer: Theresa Plummer-Andrews
- Producer: Clive Juster
- Running time: 10 minutes per episode (approx.)
- Production companies: King Rollo Films; Abbey Home Media

Original release
- Network: CBeebies; BBC Two
- Release: 29 September 2003 – 20 October 2004

Wide-Eye is a 2003 British animated children's television series set in fictional Natterjack Forest. The series consists of a series of ten-minute episodes and is about a wise, old owl who lives in a tall tree with his young son, Little Hoot, and his energetic sidekick, Flea. The series aired on CBeebies from 29 September 2003 to 20 October 2004.

== Characters ==
=== Main characters ===
- Wide Eye the Owl (voiced by Anton Rodgers) – The title character of the series, an old owl who lives in the tallest tree in the forest with his young son, Little Hoot and his sidekick, Flea. Wide Eye is fatherly, gentle and reliable. He mostly watches over all the animals to make sure they are all safe and happy and speaks in a deep voice.
- Little Hoot – (voiced by Maria Darling) – Wide Eye's young son. He is brave and strong, he speaks in a high-pitched voice, is full of adventure and imagination, can see in the dark and is always eager to learn, although like many children, he is sometimes daunted by new challenges.
- Flea – (voiced by Jane Horrocks) – Little Hoot's childlike sidekick and best friend. She can jump the highest and is always ready to join in with Little Hoot's adventures.
- The Natterjack Toads (voiced by Maria Darling, Jane Horrocks and Jimmy Hibbert) – Three green and orange toadlets who live and play at Natterjack Pond. Their names are Nat, Flo and Jack.
- Mother Natterjack – (voiced by Jane Horrocks) A female orange toad who is mother of the Natterjack Toads.
- Great Grandma Toad (voiced by Anton Rodgers) – Another female orange toad who is grandmother of the Natterjack Toads. She wears purple glasses and often cooks healthy meals for all the natterjack toads to share.
- Father Natterjack (voiced by Anton Rodgers) – A male green toad who is father of the Natterjack Toads.
- 99 the Centipede – (voiced by Jimmy Hibbert) – A dozy, bumbling centipede who lives alone in a burrow dug deep into the Natterjack forest floor. Easily distracted, he tries his best to count and match his many pairs of coloured boots, but he keeps losing count, and he is forced to start over and over again.
- Conchita the Chinchilla (voiced by Maria Darling) – A blue and white chinchilla who is the Chilean-accented, friendly and kind-hearted soul of the forest with good eyesight. She lives under the roots of a tree. She dances and sings and enjoys cooking South American food for all the forest animals to share. She is often seen wearing exotic Chilean clothing.
- Rangatang the Orangutan – (voiced by Jimmy Hibbert) – An orangutan who lives in a treehouse. He often plays jokes on the other forest animals as well as bringing fun and games to the forest and running a corner shop.
- Hetty Hornet (voiced by Maria Darling) – A hornet who lives in a beehive and likes the forest to be clean and tidy. She always tries to keep the other forest animals on their toes by handing out useful little tasks to keep them busy.
- The Fireflies – Several nocturnal fireflies who appear at night in Natterjack Forest. The fireflies themselves only make buzzing sounds instead of saying words.
- Wily Komodo (voiced by Jimmy Hibbert) – The main antagonist, a komodo dragon who appears in almost every episode in the series. He almost always causes mischief in Natterjack Forest. He lives in a rocky, roofless den with his young son, Baby Komodo, and because time is never on his side, he causes nothing but mayhem wherever he goes.
- Baby Komodo (voiced by Jane Horrocks) – Wily Komodo's young son who is still fond of swimming, but also apparently friends with Little Hoot and Flea. Although he desperately wants to be as silly as his dad, Wily Komodo, as well as be friends with all the other natterjack forest animals, his main skills are dribbling, running, and even din-making.
- Batwing the Bat (voiced by Maria Darling) – Wily Komodo's only spy. She sleeps upside down in her rocky cave located on the outskirts of the forest and can fly unaided, even by night.

=== Guests/Mentioned ===
- The Moon – A real, faceless, silent moon which appears every night of the year in Natterjack Forest. The moon is not always seen in the sky, but its only role is to brighten up the darkness in the forest between dusk and dawn every day of the year.
- The Sun – a real, silent, faceless, dazzling, sun which appears during various episodes, including Snapdragon Monster and The Forest Regatta. The sun generally shines in the sky above Natterjack Forest between dawn and dusk every day of the year, and although it is not always seen in the sky, it is by far the most important source of energy for life in the forest.

== Episodes ==
No.	Title	Written by	Original release date
1	"Little Hoot Learns To Fly"	Jimmy Hibbert	29 September 2003
Wide Eye teaches Little Hoot how to fly. Little Hoot gradually gains courage to fly, which he uses to his advantage.
2	"Message in a Bottle"	Jimmy Hibbert	6 October 2003
Little Hoot and Flea pretend that they are stranded on a desert island in the middle of the sea.
3	"Toad in a Teapot"	Jimmy Hibbert	13 October 2003
Little Hoot and the Natterjacks set off to visit their Great Grandma. But, unknown to them, Wily Komodo is on their trail - alone.
4	"The Weather Machine"	Jan Page	20 October 2003
While trying to find out about a forest feast, Wily Komodo mistakes a newly constructed weather machine for a flying machine.
5	"Conchita's Party"	Jimmy Hibbert	27 October 2003
Little Hoot and Flea prepare a special welcome home party for Conchita, while Batwing and the Komodos attempt to crash it.
6	"A Snowy Owl"	Jimmy Hibbert	3 November 2003
Natterjack Forest is lying under a blanket of snow, leaving the Natterjack Toad Family homeless along with their lake frozen.
7	"Snapdragon Monster"	Jimmy Hibbert	10 November 2003
Little Hoot and Flea dig a big, deep hole, hoping to catch a Snapdragon Monster, but they trap Wily Komodo instead.
8	"The Jolly Natterjack"	Jimmy Hibbert	17 November 2003
Inspired by Father Natterjack's story about a sunken ship, Little Hoot and Flea learn to swim at Natterjack Pond before looking for treasure.
9	"Rangatang's Shop"	Jimmy Hibbert	24 November 2003
On a bright, sunny morning in Natterjack Forest, Little Hoot and Flea listen to their favourite story about how Rangatang came to Natterjack Forest and "set up" his corner shop.
10	"Spotty Little Hoot"	Diane Redmond	1 December 2003
Little Hoot wakes up one morning with a tickly throat, a high temperature and several big, red spots on his face and body. Mother Natterjack and Batwing cure Little Hoot, and then Flea gets ill.
11	"99's Boot"	Jan Page	8 December 2003
Wily Komodo steals one of 99's boots, which Flea is hiding in. Before long, everyone in Natterjack Forest, including Hetty Hornet, notices that Flea is missing, and they set out to find him, as well as 99's missing boot. Eventually, both lost things turn up in the most unexpected of places!
12	"Komodo's Crossing"	Jimmy Hibbert	15 December 2003
When Little Hoot and Flea are unable to use a bridge that they and the Natterjack Toad Family have built, thanks to a wicked woodland sprite, Wide Eye comes to the rescue, deciding that Wily Komodo is responsible for the sprite.
13	"The Forest Regatta"	Jimmy Hibbert	22 December 2003
The river has dried up and the water level in Natterjack Pond has fallen, all because Wily and Baby Komodo have built a dam out of rocks and tree branches which threatens to spoil a specially planned regatta.
14	"Great Grandma's Birthday"	Diane Redmond	29 December 2003
Great Grandma Toad's 100th birthday party goes wrong, when Uncle Jolly's invitation goes missing, thanks to Wily Komodo.
15	"Big Baby"	Jo Allen	6 August 2004
Spring has sprung in Natterjack Forest, and there is one very interesting new arrival – a gigantic egg!
16	"Wondrous Wishing Tree"	Jan Page	13 August 2004
It is autumn in Natterjack Forest and poor Wide Eye has a bout of flu, which a special-but-deciduous tree helps cure.
17	"Hetty Hornet Gets Busy"	Diane Redmond	20 August 2004
Hetty Hornet is very busy, running the forest postal service, and it gets even more demanding when the wind mixes up the letters, causing everyone in the forest to receive the wrong messages. Hetty Hornet has some sorting to do.
18	"Time For Bed"	Jan Page	27 August 2004
Little Hoot has trouble sleeping one night when he believes that a monster is on the loose. At least Wide Eye and Flea think that that is not true.
19	"Firefly Moon"	Jan Page	1 September 2004
Pretending to be astronauts, Little Hoot and Flea try to capture the moon. In a pre-credits sequence, Baby Komodo tells Wily Komodo that he would like the sun as a present, but Wily Komodo just ignores him.
20	"The Natterjack Band"	Jimmy Hibbert	8 September 2004
Little Hoot and Flea recruit their friends from the forest for their band.
21	"Batwing's Cave"	Jan Page	15 September 2004
Little Hoot and Flea visit Batwing's secret cave, but sadly, they are not alone. Wily and Baby Komodo are in hot pursuit – they want to steal some shiny crystals that live in the cave.
22	"Zoom to the Moon"	Jimmy Hibbert	22 September 2004
One night in Natterjack Forest, Little Hoot and Flea build a rocket to fly to the moon in. In a dream, Little Hoot and Flea count down to Blast Off and then, they fly to the moon in their rocket, regardless of them being confronted by Wily Komodo and Wide Eye.
23	"The Special Club"	Jan Page	29 September 2004
With a newly-built play den, Little Hoot and Flea plan to organise a special club for any animal in Natterjack Forest who has a special talent, but, as usual, things do not turn out quite as expected.
24	"A Winter Surprise"	Jan Page	6 October 2004
The entire forest is eventually transformed into a Winter Wonderland, in the middle of Summer!
25	"The Natterjack Forest Fair"	Jo Allen	13 October 2004
Everyone in Natterjack Forest prepare for the Spring fair on one beautiful sunny Spring day.
26	"The Big Sleep"	Jan Page	20 October 2004
It is almost Mid-Winter's Day in Natterjack Forest, and some of the forest animals are preparing for hibernation, including Conchita.

== See also ==
- The Adventures of Spot
- Maisy
- The Paz Show
- Mama Mirabelle's Home Movies
- Humf
- Poppy Cat
