= Towser =

- Genre: Animated series
- Created by: Tony Ross
- Written by: Tony Ross
- Narrated by: Roy Kinnear
- Theme music composer: Duncan Lamont
- Composer: Duncan Lamont
- Country of origin: United Kingdom
- Original language: English
- No. of series: 1
- No. of episodes: 26

Production
- Producer: Clive Juster
- Editor: David McKee
- Running time: 5 minutes
- Production company: King Rollo Films

Original release
- Network: ITV
- Release: 11 September – 16 October 1984

Towser is a British series of children's books created by veteran children's writer and illustrator Tony Ross and published by Anderson Press. The series is about an intelligent dog, Towser, and his friends The King, The Wizard, Dr. Smelly and Sadie; and a variety of adversaries such as the Terrible Thing, the Water Rats, and Goblin Gobble.

== Television series ==
The book series spawned an animated television series narrated by Roy Kinnear and made by British animation studios King Rollo Films (best known for making well known animated works for children such as King Rollo, Mr Benn and Spot) for ITV Central which ran for one season of 26 episodes. It was made in 1982 and aired on ITV as part of Children's ITV on 11 September 1984 and ending on 16 October on the same year. The series was also repeated on ITV in 1988 for a short while and aired one last time in August of that year as part of the summer morning programming on Children's ITV. Towser later aired on Channel 4 in 1990 and was shown as part of their block of classic children's television series Take 5 in 1994 along with other children's programmes that had previously aired on other networks such as Paddington, Mio Mao, The Magic Roundabout, Willo the Wisp, Tales of the Riverbank, Mr Men, Fred Basset, Ivor the Engine and Roobarb. It has also been broadcast on cable television on The Children's Channel and was shown there numerous of times from 1985 to 1996.

== Play It Again ==
Towser was later joined by King Rollo Films' other television programmes Mr Benn, King Rollo and Victor and Maria and both of them aired with a 40-minute compilation programme called Play It Again. The theme song was sung by jazz and blues singer George Melly.

== Global broadcasts ==
Towser also aired in several different countries such as ABC TV in Australia (it first aired on the ABC in early 1984 several months before its UK television debut), TV One and TV2 in New Zealand, TV2, TV3 and M-Net in South Africa, XEIPN-TV 11 in Mexico, ZBC TV in Zimbabwe, Channel 5 in Singapore (as part of Play It Again), NTA in Nigeria and Nickelodeon (being shown on the Nick Jr. series Eureeka's Castle) and Cartoon Network (being shown on the children's anthology series Small World) in the US.

== Availability ==
All 26 episodes of the show were released on DVD in the UK by Demand DVD in 2013.

== Episodes ==
01. Towser and the Terrible Thing
02. Towser and Sadie's Birthday
03. Towser and the Lion
04. Towser and the Water Rats
05. Towser and the Smile Machine
06. Towser and Goblin Gobble
07. Towser and the Magic Apple
08. Towser and the Nosey Parker
09. Towser and Sadie's Robot
10. Towser and the Holiday
11. Towser and the Alien Invader
12. Towser and the Funny Face
13. Towser and the Secret
14. Towser and the Wizard
15. Towser and the Dinner Party
16. Towser and the Dentist
17. Towser and Uncle Bosco
18. Towser and the Snowman
19. Towser and the Space Shot
20. Towser and the Flight
21. Towser and the Black Hole
22. Towser and the Haunted House
23. Towser and the Black Knight
24. Towser and the Dragon
25. Towser and the Slight Accident*
26. Towser and the Conjuror**

*This was broadcast as the 26th and final episode

**Despite being the final episode, this was broadcast as the very first one
