= Humf =

2007 British TV series or programme

- Genre: Children's series Animated series
- Country of origin: United Kingdom
- No. of episodes: 78

Production
- Running time: 7 minutes
- Production companies: King Rollo Films; Rubber Duck Entertainment

Original release
- Network: Nick Jr.
- Release: 2 March 2009

Related
- Maisy; The Paz Show; Wide-Eye; Mama Mirabelle's Home Movies; Poppy Cat

Humf is a British animated children's television programme centred on a furry creature of the same name and his exploration of the world. The show is produced by King Rollo Films and Rubber Duck. It is narrated by Caroline Quentin and was broadcast on Nick Jr. and Nick Jr. 2 from 2009-2017 in the UK and Ireland, ABC in Australia, RTÉ in Ireland, TVB in Hong Kong, Knowledge Network and BBC Kids in Canada, Okto in Singapore, Four in New Zealand and CBeebies in some international countries. The episodes are usually around 7 minutes long.

== Main characters ==
- Humf is a purple furry thing and the friend of Wallace and Loon. He resides in the middle flat of a multi-level home, with Wallace above him and Loon below him. Humf is known for his curiosity about the world around him and his desire to try new things, although he sometimes struggles to accomplish his goals.
- Loon is a pink feathery thing who lives in the flat below Humf and loves to go to the park and supermarket, most of the time with her best friend Bewla, and friends Humf and Wallace, along with her mum. She is the only one of the trio whose dad is never seen or mentioned.
- Wallace is a green hairy thing who runs around and lives on the very top floor of the three-story building.
- Humf's parents are blue and red. His mum is blue, and his dad is red.
- Uncle Hairy is Humf's uncle and likes to play with his friends.
- Loon's Mum her mum is pink purple.
- Wallace's parents; his mum is green, and his dad is blue.
- Flora is Uncle Hairy's girlfriend and Humf's auntie.
- Bewla is Loon's best friend and Humf's other best friend. She is a blue fluffy thing with red hair and pointy ears. Like Loon, her dad is never seen or mentioned.
- Bewla's Mum is a brown maned red fluffy thing.

== Places ==
Most episodes of the show take place in the main characters' flats. Frequently, the characters spend time in a local park, which is a short walk away from their flats and requires crossing a road. The park features play equipment, a sandpit, and open green spaces for running around. Occasionally, the characters visit the nearby supermarket, which can be reached by walking along a pathway.

In the episode "Humf Goes Swimming," Humf and Loon's moms take them to the Swimming Pool, which includes a pool, a small slide, and changing rooms. In the episode "Uncle Hairy's Cinema," Uncle Hairy and his girlfriend Flora take Humf, Loon, and Wallace to the cinema. They travel there by bus since it was mentioned in the episode that walking would be too far.

== Typical plot ==
In general, the plots of the show revolve around Humf and his adventures in exploring the world. One example is when Humf and his friends go to the park and notice litter on the ground. They have a discussion about it and then begin picking it up and putting it in the bin with growing enthusiasm. However, Humf's mom intervenes when he tries to pick up a banana skin and explains that, for safety reasons, they shouldn't attempt to pick up all the litter because some of it can be yucky.

== Other details ==
The series is aimed at pre-school children and was created by Andrew Brenner, directed by Neil Fitzgibbon, and produced by Alexi Wheeler.

== Episode list ==
=== Season 1 ===
1. Humf's Shadow
2. Humf Hangs Up The Laundry
3. Humf Is Hiding
4. Humf And The Ants
5. Humf's Friends
6. Humf Is A Furry Thing
7. Humf And The Scary Thing
8. Humf's Special Stick
9. Humf And The Hole In The Park
10. Humf And The Balloons
11. Humf's Special Cup
12. Humf's Ball
13. Humf's Favourite Book
14. Humf Wakes Up Early
15. Humf's Picnic
16. Humf And The Tickle Monster
17. Humf And The Moon
18. Humf And All The Stars
19. Uncle Hairy's Band
20. Humf Goes Fast
21. Humf's New Word
22. Humf Gets Lost
23. Humf Bakes Biscuits
24. Humf In The Fog
25. Slow Down Wallace
26. Humf And The Big Boots

=== Season 2 ===
1. Wallace's Bath
2. Humf's Painting
3. Loon's New Handbag
4. Wallace Pretends Too Much
5. Loon's Pushchair
6. Humf Goes Very High
7. Wallace's Quiet Game
8. Humf's Red Mittens
9. Humf Climbs A Mountain
10. Uncle Hairy's Restaurant
11. Uncle Hairy's Cinema
12. Humf and the Fluffy Thing
13. Mum And Dad's Party
14. Loon's Ballet Lesson
15. Humf's Surprise
16. Humf And The Bed Bugs
17. Humf And Wallace Fall Down
18. Humf Changes His Mind
19. Dad Goes on an Aeroplane
20. Humf Puts It In The Bin
21. Humf's Dog
22. Humf And Loon's Special Treat
23. Wallace's Favourite Toy
24. Wallace's Tie
25. Uncle Hairy's Keys
26. Sitting Next To Uncle Hairy

=== Season 3 ===
1. Mum's Flower
2. Fireman Wallace
3. Loon's Treasure
4. Loon's Jack In The Box
5. Humf's Splinter
6. Wallace Won't Come Home
7. Wallace's Bubbles
8. Uncle Hairy's Takeaway
9. Loon's Paddling Pool
10. Loon's Best Friend
11. Humf Goes Swimming
12. Humf's New Name
13. Humf's Busy Family
14. Loon's Blackboard
15. Crispy Cakehead Is Sad
16. Loon's House
17. Humf And The Wind
18. Humf Is Very Big
19. Humf's Mum's Phone
20. Everybody Copies Uncle Hairy
21. Humf's Dad Stays In Bed
22. Flora Comes to Babysit
23. Loon Goes Far Away
24. Loon Gets Stuck
25. Uncle Hairy's Magic
26. Wallace Gets Very Cross
