= Maisy (TV series) =

- Genre: Children's, animated
- Created by: Lucy Cousins
- Based on: Maisy (book series) by Lucy Cousins
- Written by: Andrew Brenner; Jeanne Willis
- Directed by: Leo Nielsen
- Voices of: The Umbilical Brothers
- Narrated by: Neil Morrissey (UK version); Brian Greene (US version)
- Theme music composer: KICK Productions
- Opening theme: "Maisy"
- Ending theme: "Maisy"
- Composer: KICK Productions
- Countries of origin: United Kingdom; United States
- Original language: English
- No. of seasons: 1
- No. of episodes: 26 (104 segments)

Production
- Executive producer: Lucinda Whiteley
- Producer: Clive Juster
- Editor: Christopher Gunningham
- Running time: 24 minutes
- Production companies: King Rollo Films; PolyGram Visual Programming; Universal Pictures Visual Programming (Note: Known in earlier episodes as PolyGram Visual Programming)

Original release
- Network: ITV (CITV)
- Release: 11 February 1999 – 2 November 2000

Maisy is a preschool animated children's television series based on the book series of the same name by Lucy Cousins. The series aired from 11 February 1999 to 2 November 2000 on CITV and consisted of 26 episodes, with each episode being made up of four segments. It won the British Academy Children's Award for Pre-School Animation in 2000.

== Plot ==
The show focuses on the lives of Maisy Mouse and all her friends. A mellow-voiced narrator narrates the action and communicates with the characters while the animals go through their paces communicating through unusual noises rather than traditional language. The characters are all meant to be between four and nine years old. The male narrator, however, can understand them easily because he is the only one who actually speaks. The animated series keeps the two-dimensional visual style of the books.

== Characters ==
- Maisy is a white mouse who lives in an orange house with a red roof and green door. She wears different clothes. She loves to paint and play with all her friends.
- Charley is a green crocodile who loves to eat food.
- Cyril is a brown squirrel who wears a yellow or green shirt.
- Tallulah is a yellow chick who is almost always seen wearing a dress and a bow.
- Eddie is an elephant who is often in settings where he is much too big to participate as he is often depicted as being almost animalistic rather than anthropomorphic in appearance.

All the characters had their vocal effects provided by The Umbilical Brothers

== Episodes ==
The show ran for one series of 26 episodes, with each episode consisting of four segments.

No.	Title	Object	Original release date
1	"Farm / Picnic / Pool / Camping"	Red Tractor Picnic Bag Wading Pool Yellow Tent	11 February 1999
Maisy enjoys a fun packed day on the farm, helped by her friend the little black cat. She collects eggs from the chickens, rides a horse and feeds the geese and then she takes her tractor to muck out the pigs and the lambs before tucking up everyone in bed for the night; Maisy finds that she makes some new friends when she goes for a picnic in the woods; It's a very hot day and Maisy and Tallulah decide to get out the wading pool. Once it's finally full of water, Eddie arrives and joins in the fun; Maisy and Tallulah pitch their tent in the garden - Charley decides to take a well-earned nap and Cyril brings the refreshments. They settle down for a peaceful night's sleep, but a nearby owl decides that it's time to wake up now.
2	"Rabbit / Boat / Hide and Seek / Playground"	Rabbit Sailing Boat Charley Behind a Bush Yellow Slide	12 February 1999
Maisy is picking flowers in her garden when she meets Rabbit who seems to enjoy eating the flowers too. Maisy takes him home for lunch; Maisy sails her boat on a breezy day, and meets an octopus and a shoal of fish and plays ball with a dolphin. When the wind drops, a seagull and a whale come to her rescue; Maisy, Charley and Tallulah are playing hide and seek. Charley is a little slow to catch on but soon realizes that he has the best disguise of all; Maisy's at the playground and discovers that her friends Tallulah, Charley and Cyril are there, too. Together they play on the slide, the swings and the seesaw and after a popsicle, they feed the ducks and head for home.
3	"Spots / Bird / Washing / Sandcastle"	Coloured Spots European Robin Washing Machine Sandcastle	18 February 1999
Maisy is spotting spotty things - a leopard, a snake, a ladybug, a frog and a giraffe. When she meets a zebra, she decides that wants to be spotty and stripy at the same time; It's a freezing cold winters day and Maisy sees that the birds are pecking the frozen ground in search of food. Maisy knows just what they need - a bird table; It's wash day and Maisy is putting her washing out to dry, but her dress blows away just as she is hanging it out on the line. With Charley's help, she eventually manages to retrieve the dress from the top of a tree; Maisy goes to the beach and with the help of a friendly crab builds a fabulous sandcastle and is crowned Queen of the Castle.
4	"Bat / Ball / Gingerbread / Meow"	Bat Hanging Upside Down Ball Gingerbread Cookie Cat in the Basket	19 February 1999
Maisy can't sleep, and when she looks out of the window, she sees a dark shape flitting around the garden. She goes out to investigate and meets a very friendly bat - together they explore the garden in the moonlight, until Maisy starts to feel sleepy and goes back to bed; Maisy and Tallulah want to play ball, but it's hard to find somewhere completely ball proof; Maisy is baking today - she decides to make some gingerbread shapes and when Charley and Tallulah arrive, Maisy greets them with a surprise; The little ginger cat comes to spend the night, and when Maisy wakes up in the morning, she finds that she has some unexpected visitors.
5	"Train / Bike / Party / Bedtime"	Green Steam Train Bike Party Chest Bedtime	25 February 1999
Maisy is driving the train, picking up animals on the way - two giraffes, three peacocks, four snakes, five ducks, six rabbits, seven birds, eight frogs and nine penguins. At the last stop, she finds ten piglets, but sees that they don't fit in to the carriage and Maisy must find a way to put them; Charley borrows Maisy's bike, but when it goes missing, Charley is distraught. Maisy solves the mystery of the disappearing bike with the help of her ball; Maisy is going to Tallulah's fancy dress party but she just can't find a thing to wear. Every time she settles on something, she finds that someone else has got there first. Finally, she decides to create something herself; It's time for bed. Maisy draws the curtains and says good-night to the owl. She washes her face and hands, brushes her teeth, changes into her pajamas, goes off to the potty and finally gets to sleep ... once she's found Panda.
6	"Bus / Swing / Dog / Birthday"	Green Bus Tree Swing Dog Birthday Cake	26 February 1999
Maisy is driving the bus today and she finds that she has all sorts of passengers to pick up on the way; Maisy decides to make a swing for her garden, and whilst Charley and Cyril play games with the rope, she disappears into her garden shed. Charley is the first to have a go on the new swing and Maisy and Cyril try out the new swing together; Maisy is sailing her toy boat and meets a friendly dog on the way. When her boat gets stuck in the reeds Maisy's new friend comes to the rescue, with rather damp results; Today is Maisy's birthday party. Charley, Cyril and Tallulah come to help her celebrate.
7	"Rain / Nest / Plane / Parade"	Rain Cloud Bird in a nest Airplane Trumpet	4 March 1999
It's raining and Charley has forgotten his umbrella, something which Maisy finds is easily done; Maisy helps a little bird to build her nest in a tree in Maisy's garden. She lays three eggs which hatch into three little birds. When the mother bird flies off to find some food for her birds, Maisy tries to keep them amused, but Maisy is very relieved when the mother bird returns; Maisy and Cyril are making paper airplanes. Maisy's airplane can't fly very well, and lands in the sink. Cyril's airplane flies beautifully through the house, out of the window and all round the garden; Maisy decides to make some music and on the way all her friends join in the parade.
8	"Fair / Treasure / Sheep / Clouds"	Helter Skelter Pirate Hat Sheep Two Clouds	5 March 1999
Maisy and Tallulah go to the fair, but Tallulah is impatient and wants to go on every ride immediately. Tallulah has to learn to be patient and not to run ahead; Maisy and Charley are pretending to be pirates, digging for buried treasure. They find all sorts of things, including a very special hidden treasure, Tallulah; Maisy and Tallulah are going for a walk and when Tallulah loses her ribbon she forgets to close the gate to the field and the sheep escape. Maisy and Tallulah must return sheep into the field; A ride is high up in the sky, in Maisy's hot air balloon.
9	"Fleas / Boo / Stick / Mess"	Flea Lion's Head Stick Building Blocks	25 March 1999
Eddie the elephant decides he needs a bath so Maisy helps him with a ladder, a brush and bar of soap. One by one ten fleas hop off Eddie, protesting all the way; Maisy and Cyril are playing peepo, but Cyril manages to give himself a fright too; Maisy's got a special stick, and she finds all sorts of uses for it; Maisy and her friends find the mess and they must tidy up.
10	"Harvest / Shed / Playhouse / Circus"	Vegetables Garden Shed Playhouse Circus Tent	26 March 1999
Maisy's in her vegetable garden, counting out her vegetables - Rabbit decides to come along, just in case there's something there for him too; Maisy decides that her shed needs a new coat of paint, and Eddie decides to help, with very colourful results; Maisy is entertaining her toys to tea when Charley drops in to the Playhouse. Even though it's only make believe Charley finds out that there's nothing like the real thing; It's circus time and Maisy is the ringmaster - everyone has something to do, and the grand finale is colorful and fun.
11	"Dancing / Ouch / Eggs / Bath"	Yellow Stereo Bandage Easter Eggs Rubber Ducky	6 May 1999
Maisy and Tallulah are having great fun showing each other how to dance to different styles of music. Charley arrives at Maisy's house, and shows them that he is rather a good dancer too; Eddie, Cyril and Maisy are playing in the garden. When Eddie takes a tumble, Maisy and Cyril try to make him feel better; Maisy is getting ready for an Easter egg hunt in her garden. Charley arrives early and decides to help; Maisy's having a bath, or at least she's trying to, but Tallulah won't take no for an answer. She really wants Maisy to play with her.
12	"Balloons / Lemonade / Tummyache / Guitar"	Red Balloon Lemon Plate of Cupcakes Acoustic Guitar	20 May 1999
Cyril and Maisy buy some balloons, but they find that it's not so easy to stop them flying away; It's a hot day and Maisy makes a home made lemonade; Charley's eyes are bigger than his tummy, and Maisy has to find a way to make him feel better; Maisy is making music, with a little help from her friends.
13	"Knock Knock / Panda / Follow the Leader / Beach"	Maisy's Front Door Panda in a Buggy Trail of Arrows Bucket and Shovel on Sand	6 December 1999
Maisy wants to play today, and so she goes to all her friends' houses to see if they want to play but no-one is in - what Maisy doesn't know is that everyone is waiting for her at her house; Maisy and Panda are off to the park, but Panda decides that he wants to do a little exploring of his own; Maisy and Tallulah are playing follow the leader - when Eddie joins in they find out that there are some things which everyone can do, and some things which only an elephant can do; Maisy and Cyril go to the beach, but Cyril is bit wary of going into the sea. He soon forgets his worries though, and finds that splashing about in the water can be as much fun as anything else.
14	"Umbrella / Rollerskates / Feather / Cleaning"	Red Umbrella Blue Rollerskate White Feather Spray Cleaner and Cloth	7 December 1999
It's Charley's birthday, and he receives many interesting presents, but the one he's most interested in is the umbrella which Maisy gives him. The only problem is that it doesn't look as though it's going rain. Eddie saves the day though, and makes Charley's birthday complete; Maisy's going out on her roller skates today, and she finds that with a little practise she is really good at roller skating. Tallulah thinks so, too; There are so many things you can do with a feather, as Maisy and her friends find out today; Maisy's spring cleaning her house, and by giving her a helping hand Charley finds a good way to earn some of Maisy's delicious cakes.
15	"Library / Squeak / Puppets / Hose"	Bookshelf Oil Can Bear Hand-puppet Spraying Hose	9 December 1999
It's time for Maisy and Charley to take those books back to the library, and to choose some new ones; Cyril comes to the playground to show everyone his new car, but it's so new it still squeaks when he's pedalling! Maisy knows what to do though; Maisy and her friends decide to put on a show for Panda - a very special show, with puppets; Maisy and Cyril are fire chiefs today, but little black cat doesn't seem too keen to join in - maybe it's their hose which is worrying her.
16	"Fish / Hiccups / Ice / Puzzle"	Goldfish Glass of Lemonade Icy Window Jigsaw Puzzle Piece	10 December 1999
It's time for spring cleaning for Maisy's fish, and Tallulah comes along to give her a helping hand; Maisy and Cyril find out when Cyril drinks his lemonade just a bit too quickly and gets hiccups; It's a very cold day and Maisy finds a beautiful sparkling icicle on her walk. As the icicle begins to melt, she decides to find a way of keeping it; Charley goes to see Maisy, and they decide to do a jigsaw puzzle together, but one of the pieces is missing. Eventually they find it, in a most unexpected hiding place.
17	"Snow / Cards / Christmas Tree / Christmas"	Snow-capped Pine Tree Christmas Card Christmas Tree Present in a Red Stocking	24 December 1999
Maisy makes a snowmouse and runs off to play in the snow with her friends Tallulah, Charley and Cyril. When Maisy gets covered in snow her friends don't know which is the real Maisy; Maisy decides to make some cards, and Cyril joins in too; Maisy and Tallulah set off to choose a Christmas tree, but they find that decorating it is not as easy as they think; It's Christmas Eve and all round Maisy's house, nothing is stirring, except a very excited little mouse.
18	"Breakfast / Doctor / Duckling / Swimming"	Bowl of Cereal First-aid Box Yellow Duckling Striped Swimsuit	13 March 2000
It's breakfast time at the farm and Maisy is here to give all the animals their breakfast; Maisy's the doctor today, and Tallulah decides that she wants to be the nurse; Maisy and Charley meet the duck family on their way to the playground, but the littlest duckling decides that he'd much rather play with Charley than go home to the pond; It's swimming time, and Maisy, Charley and Tallulah are off to the swimming pool. Tallulah wants to be the first in, but she doesn't like the cold water at all.
19	"Oops / Igloo / Sardines (Hide and Squeeze - USA) / Dolphin"	Blue Potty Igloo Eddie behind a sofa Dolphin	20 March 2000
It's a hot day and Maisy and Cyril are playing in the sandpit. Cyril gets caught short, but Maisy saves the day; On a snowy day, Charley comes over to play at Maisy's. Together, the two construct an igloo. They are soon joined by a little bird; Everyone's round at Maisy's house, playing a game of sardines. The only problem is that Eddie's much too big to squeeze in with everyone else, so he finds his own way of playing; Maisy's going deep sea diving today, and Dolphin is there to guide her through the underwater world.
20	"Footprints / Sky / Wheel / Go"	Trail of Footprints Sun behind the Clouds Wheel Traffic Lights	27 March 2000
It's a rainy day and Maisy decides to go for a walk in the garden. It's so muddy that she sees many other footprints and decides to follow them, meeting many friends on the way; Maisy sees a variety of animals and sights as she flies along in her airplane; It's Push Horse's turn to play with Maisy, Tallulah and Panda today, but when he loses a wheel, it takes a clever Maisy to figure out what to do about it; Maisy's going for a ride on her bike, and as all her friends join in too until they know it they've got a great big convoy, riding along the road.
21	"Mountain / Bubbles / Kangaroo / Goodnight (Sleepover - USA)"	Mountain Bubbles Kangaroo Night Sky	10 October 2000
Everyone's going mountain climbing today, and Maisy leads the way to the top; Charley's blowing many bubbles, until Eddie accidentally knocks over his bubble liquid - Maisy knows how to make some more though; Maisy meets a kangaroo and her baby, who decides that he wants to come out and play; Tallulah comes to stay the night with Maisy.
22	"Hello / Chocolate Cake / Toot Toot / Piggy Back"	Maisy Mouse Chocolate Cake Brass Whistle Tallulah on Charley's back	12 October 2000
There are so many different ways of saying hello, as Maisy finds out when she goes for a walk and meets some new friends, including a lion, and some old friends too, a very fierce sounding Tallulah; It's someone's birthday today, because Maisy is making a very special chocolate birthday cake; Maisy and all her friends are going on a very special train journey, all around the world!; Maisy, Tallulah and Cyril are giving each other piggy back rides, and when Charley comes along he wants to join in, too. But he's too big, and it's only Eddie who can save the day.
23	"Penguins / Sneezes / Hop / Tennis"	Penguin Tissue Box Frog Tennis Racket	17 October 2000
Maisy's having a great time on her sledge when she is joined by some very special friends - nine penguins who show to her how it's really done; Cyril gets a cold, but he won't admit it, and it's only when Maisy takes him home and tucks him up in bed that he starts to feel a bit better; Hopping is fun, as Maisy finds out when she plays hopscotch with Charley and her friends in the playground; Maisy and Tallulah are playing tennis, but they need a bit of help with the really high shots, so Eddie and Charley join in too.
24	"Ferry / Snail / Bounce / Batteries"	Ferry Snail Bouncing Ball Battery	19 October 2000
Maisy's operating the ferry today, and she finds that it's going to be a very busy day, with many demanding passengers; Charley's helping Maisy in her garden and meets a little snail who he really wants to make friends with; Cyril's got a very bouncy new ball, which Maisy and Tallulah decide is great fun to play with; Cyril's got a brand new toy car, and Maisy and Tallulah are having great fun playing with it until the batteries run out.
25	"Shopping / Bugs / Hats / Telescope"	Shopping Cart Bee, Dragonfly, Cricket and Spider Hats Telescope	31 October 2000
It's nearly lunchtime and Charley's got nothing to eat, but he's going to go shopping at the supermarket with Maisy; Maisy can hear all sorts of noises very carefully, as Maisy finds out; Maisy and Cyril find out how many different types of hat there are; Maisy and her friends learn all about how to make things look bigger, with the help of Eddie's magnifying glass and Charley's telescope.
26	"Rowing / Wheelbarrow / Torch (Flashlight - USA) / Band"	Rowing Boat Red Wheelbarrow Torch Guitar, Trumpet and Drum	2 November 2000
Maisy, Charley and Tallulah decide to take their boats out on the lake, but Tallulah doesn't realise that it's very easy for a boat to drift away; Maisy is planting a new tree in the garden and Rabbit comes along to give her a helping hand; Tallulah brings her new torch round to show Maisy which comes in very handy when Cyril manages to lose his bouncy ball somewhere in Maisy's bedroom; It's time to make music - Maisy and her friends set up all their instruments, and once Eddie has decided which instrument he wants, the band begins to play.

=== Song shorts ===
- Maisy Mouse Theme Song
- Drip Drip Drop (The Rain Song)
- Here We Go Round the Mulberry Bush
- I Look Out of My Window
- I'm Going to Write a Letter
- The Wheels on the Bus Go Round & Round
- What Should We Do When We All Come In?
- Maisy, Maisy Had a Farm
- Row, Row, Row Your Boat

== Broadcast ==
Maisy first aired on CITV in the United Kingdom from 11 February 1999 to 2 November 2000, with repeats airing until the mid-2000s.

In the United States, the series aired on the Nick Jr. block on Nickelodeon from 1999 to 2000, with repeats airing on Noggin from 2001 to 2007 and on Qubo from 2008 to 2012.

== Accolades ==
Maisy won the British Academy Children's Award for Pre-School Animation in 2000.

== My Friend Maisy ==
In January 2024, it was announced that a new Maisy series, entitled My Friend Maisy, was put into development at Trustbridge Entertainment, with 52 five-minute episodes planned for the series. No date or broadcaster was announced for the project. In September, it was announced that the company would co-produce the series with BBC Studios Kids & Family and that A Productions and Karrot would handle animation production. It was also said that the series would take a more surreal approach than the slice-of-life nature of the 1999 series. On 10 June 2025, Sky Kids was announced to be the series' commissioner, and the series premiered on 16 February 2026. For the first time, children can hear Maisy speak as she and the other characters talk to each other, unlike the original series which had an adult voiceover narrative. Maisy has a Northern accent, in keeping with author and illustrator Lucy Cousins’ vision.

On 19 May 2026, a second series was greenlit. It was also announced that BBC Studios would distribute and handle consumer product rights globally except in China, where Trustbridge Entertainment would retain the rights.

== See also ==
- The Adventures of Spot
- The Paz Show
- Wide-Eye
- Mama Mirabelle's Home Movies
- Humf
- Poppy Cat
