= Art You Grew Up With =

British art company

- Type: Privately owned
- Industry: Fine Art
- Founded: 1995
- Headquarters: Oxford Street, London, England, United Kingdom
- Key people: Russell Singler, Owner and Director
- Website: http://artyougrewupwith.com

Art You Grew Up With was a UK-based specialist art company that was founded in 1995 by Russell Singler. They focus on classic and original character based artwork with many licenses for well known and iconic character based franchises.

== Company history ==
Art You Grew Up With initially started out as an individual gallery called the Animation Art Gallery near Oxford Circus before relocating to County Hall at the London Film Museum. It was during this time that the Fine Art publishing arm expanded and the company grew to become Art You Grew Up With; they now supply work to galleries on a global scale. Subsequently, show rooms have opened in Selfridges, London and House of Fraser, Manchester while a new show room is scheduled to open in Birmingham in November 2011.

== About Art You Grew Up With ==
Art You Grew Up With supply a wide and varied selection of art ranging from Animation art to Comic art, Music art to Film art, Pop art to Fine art. They are the official fine art publisher to characters such as the Mr Men, Mr Benn, Paddington Bear, Beano & Dandy, SpongeBob SquarePants and Noddy to name but a few. They have also recently taken Elmo, Grover and all the Sesame Street Gang in to the fine art world for the first time.

== Media ==
The Animation Art Gallery & Art You Grew Up With have been featured in BBC News on BBC Radio 4, the Guardian and in the Telegraph online.

== See also ==
- Animation
- Pop Art
- Fine Art
