= Fix & Foxi (TV channel) =

Group of international children's TV channels

- Country: Germany
- Broadcast area: Germany; Austria; Switzerland; United States; Latin America; Central and Eastern Europe; Africa; Middle East; Hong Kong; Indonesia; Philippines; Gibraltar; Bulgaria; Poland
- Headquarters: Munich

Programming
- Languages: German; Spanish; Bulgarian; Arabic; Polish; English
- Picture format: 1080i HDTV (downscaled to 576i/480i for the SDTV feed)

Ownership
- Owner: Your Family Entertainment

History
- Launched: December 1, 2014 (German) September 1, 2026 (Polish)

Links
- Website: http://www.fixundfoxi.tv/

Fix & Foxi is an international children's entertainment brand founded by the German company Your Family Entertainment. Themed around Rolf Kauka's Fix and Foxi characters, the name is used to operate television channels in multiple languages around the world.

The Fix & Foxi television channels broadcast children's content, both animated and live-action, from the Your Family Entertainment catalog. There are three distinct feeds: a German feed broadcasting in German and Bulgarian which transmits to German-speaking countries as well as Bulgaria; an Arabian feed broadcasting in Arabic and English which transmits to the Middle East; and a third English and Spanish feed which has been known to broadcast in North America, Africa and Asia-Pacific. All shows are typically dubbed into the target language of the network, save for Bulgarian which utilizes voice-over translation to transmit the programs in the language.

Much of the programming on the channels is shared with their sister network RiC, known as RiK in Slovakia. RiC has a German feed, a Slovak feed, and an international feed in English.

== History ==
In May 2014, German children's media company Your Family Entertainment acquired the rights to the works created by Rolf Kauka. The following October, the company announced that it would launch a German language children's entertainment channel called Fix & Foxi on December 1, 2014 in Germany, Austria and Switzerland. Hosted by the namesakes, the 24-hour linear channel would air content from its own library as well as acquisitions produced by third party distributors.

On May 23, 2017, a video-on-demand channel was launched through Amazon Channels in Austria and Germany.

On June 16, 2020, Your Family Entertainment and Blue Ant Media made a "content swap" agreement which enabled an exchange of programming between the YFE catalog and the international ZooMoo channels to occur. As a result, Fix & Foxi channels worldwide began broadcasting ZooMoo content. So far, the ZooMoo programs have only aired on the Arabian and African/Asian feeds; none of the programming has aired in German yet.

== International ==
=== America ===
In January 2015, it was announced that an English and Spanish feed of the channel would launch in the United States and Latin America through a partnership with Alterna’TV. The channel launched on 30 Spanish operators on April 3, 2015. Olympusat added both feeds to its Vemox over-the-top service in the United States in March 2018.

=== Africa and the Middle East ===
In June 2015, Your Family Entertainment announced plans to launch Fix & Foxi in Africa and the Middle East in English and Arabic, with a French language feed in the works. The channel would re-brand the company's existing yourfamily channel in the market. It first launched in Nigeria on Consat on June 1, 2015. As of 2021, a French-language feed still does not exist and it is possible that the plan to launch such a feed was scrapped.

An English version specific to Sub-Saharan Africa named My TV Toonz debuted on satellite television operator My TV on September 1, 2015. Similarly, a French version specific to the region called Ma Télé Toonz was launched the following month on sister operator Ma Télé. Citing "harsh market realities", both channels were shut down on February 6, 2017.

The channel launched in the United Arab Emirates through Etisalat's IPTV services eLife TV on November 24, 2015. Cell C launched the channel in South Africa in November 2017.

=== Europe ===
At MIPCOM 2017, Your Family Entertainment signed a partnership with Telekom Austria Group to offer Fix & Foxi across Central and Eastern Europe through satellite distribution.

Gibtelecom launched the channel in Gibraltar in June 2018.

Orange Polska launched the channel in Poland in September 2026.

=== Asia-Oceania ===
Fix & Foxi channels are operated in SMV FreeSat in Indonesia and Agilasat in the Philippines.

The channel was also available in Hong Kong by I-Cable Communications until 3 April 2021.

The channel was launched on Cignal in the Philippines on 16 November 2024.

== Satellite ==
Fix & Foxi channel transmits through 12 different satellites: Eutelsat 7, Galaxy 19, Fetch TV, Foxtel, TransACT, Freeview, Skynet 5D, NSS-806, Spainsat, Topsat, SKY PerfecTV! and Cignal TV.
