= Black Dynamite (soundtrack) =

2009 soundtrack albums

The music to the 2009 blaxploitation action comedy film Black Dynamite was released on two soundtracks. One album featured contributions from Alan Tew, Brian Bennett, Alan Hawkshaw, Johnny Pearson and Duncan Lamont and vocals contributed by Sir Charles Hughes and Nino Nardini, while the other album featured score composed by Adrian Younge. Both albums were released through Wax Poetics Records on October 20, 2009.

== Original soundtrack ==
Black Dynamite (Music Track from the Motion Picture)

Soundtrack album by Alan Tew, Brian Bennett, Alan Hawkshaw, Johnny Pearson, Duncan Lamont, Sir Charles Hughes and Nino Nardini
- Released: October 20, 2009
- Recorded: 2009
- Genre: Film soundtrack, soul, funk
- Length: 40:52
- Label: Wax Poetic Records
- Producer: David Hollander (exec.); Richard "Spice" Smith

Black Dynamite (Music Track from the Motion Picture) is the soundtrack to the film featuring compositions from Alan Tew, Brian Bennett, Alan Hawkshaw, Johnny Pearson and Duncan Lamont and vocals contributed by Sir Charles Hughes and Nino Nardini. The vocal performances had lyrics written by Adrian Younge, the film's score composer. The album was released through Wax Poetics Records on October 20, 2009, four days after the film's release.

=== Reception ===
The soundtrack received a positive reviews from Emerson Dameron, a critic based at Dusted Magazine, who wrote "Younge's music is so exactingly retro that it's a seamless two-fer." David Ma of The Guardian cited it as one of the "best blaxpotation soundtracks" and added "Younge went on to collaborate with some of the biggest musicians in the game, but this was his springboard toward greatness and a sharp nod at the Blaxploitation progeny that came before him."

=== Track listing ===
No.	Title	Artist(s)	Length
1.	"Helicop"	Alan Tew	2:53
2.	"Drama Backcloth 3"	Alan Tew	0:18
3.	"Master Plan"	Alan Tew	3:26
4.	"Scenechange 2b"	Alan Tew	0:25
5.	"Drama Backcloth 2"	Alan Tew	1:01
6.	"Name of the Game"	Brian Bennett and Alan Hawkshaw	4:24
7.	"The Detectives Interlude"	Alan Tew	1:48
8.	"Scenechange 3a"	Alan Tew	0:18
9.	"Prowler"	Brian Bennett	1:46
10.	"Scenechange 8a"	Alan Tew	0:13
11.	"High Diver"	Brian Bennett and Alan Hawkshaw	3:43
12.	"The Detectives Link 1"	Alan Tew	0:09
13.	"Spiv"	Brian Bennett	2:00
14.	"The Detectives Link 2c"	Alan Tew	0:17
15.	"Action in Memphis"	Johnny Pearson	2:10
16.	"Thug"	Brian Bennett	1:29
17.	"The Detectives Link 6b"	Alan Tew	0:28
18.	"Sunny Side Up"	Duncan Lamont	2:48
19.	"The Detectives Link 3"	Alan Tew	0:10
20.	"Eyes"	Alan Tew	0:48
21.	"The Detectives Link 5b"	Alan Tew	0:29
22.	"Dynomite"	Sir Charles Hughes	7:06
23.	"Tropicola"	Nino Nardini	2:43
Total length:			40:52

== Original score ==
Black Dynamite (Original Score to the Motion Picture)

Film score by Adrian Younge
- Released: October 20, 2009
- Recorded: 2009
- Genre: Film score, soul, funk
- Length: 35:21
- Label: Wax Poetic Records
- Producer: Adrian Younge

Black Dynamite (Original Score to the Motion Picture) is the film score composed by Adrian Younge. Younge who previously associated with Scott Sanders as a disc jockey for eight years, and the latter knew his ability on composing music. When Sanders received the script for Black Dynamite, he asked Younge regarding the film's involvement, to which he agreed. Sanders also provided creative freedom to Younge on working on the film's music.

Younge played all the instruments which began with an acoustic guitar, bass guitar, piano, flute, saxophone amongst other instructions. While playing the instruments, he understood the flute he played whether on an E note and A note, and he wrote those parts on the piano and converting the notes on flute. He followed the same process while playing the saxophones and other instruments, and it took him 2–3 days to crack those instruments. For all the themes, he understood the variations on the tempo, baselines and the overall beats. The recording of the themes took less than 15 minutes, and around 4–5 days for one theme. Inspired by the film's 1970s setting, Younge was influenced by Curtis Mayfield, Isaac Hayes, Ennio Morricone and Wu-Tang Clan and their works.

The album was published through Linear Labs records as an LP record in November 2014.

=== Reception ===
Andy Kellmann of AllMusic wrote "[Younge] skillfully walks a creative tightrope, incorporating virtually all the trademarks of an early-'70s blaxploitation score without being overly referential". Andrea Hubert of NME called it "a killer vintage-esque soundtrack".

=== Track listing ===
No.	Title	Length
1.	"Black Dynamite Theme"	3:08
2.	"Cleaning Up the Streets"	1:54
3.	"Man with the Heat" (Superbad)	4:19
4.	"Shine"	2:42
5.	"Jimmy's Dead"	2:49
6.	"Shot Me in the Heart"	2:30
7.	"Black They Back"	0:44
8.	"Gloria" (Zodiac Lovers)	4:07
9.	"Anaconda Malt Liquor"	0:19
10.	"Jimmy's Apartment"	1:04
11.	"Jimmy's Dead" (Interlude)	1:19
12.	"Chicago Wind"	2:57
13.	"Rafelli Chase"	2:29
14.	"Jimmy's Dead" (Instrumental)	2:50
15.	"Dynomite" (Suckapunch re-edit)	2:10
Total length:		35:21
