= Eric Hill =

English children's book author and illustrator (1927–2014)

Eric Hill OBE
- Born: 7 September 1927; Holloway, London, England
- Died: 6 June 2014 (aged 86); Templeton, California, U.S.
- Occupations: Children's author, illustrator
- Children: 2
- Writing career
- Notable work: Where's Spot?

Eric Hill OBE (7 September 1927 – 6 June 2014) was an English author and illustrator of children's picture books. He was best known for his puppy character named Spot. His works have been widely praised for their contributions to child literacy.

== Biography ==
Hill was born on 7 September 1927 in Holloway, London, but was evacuated to the countryside during World War II. He left school at 14 and first worked as an errand boy in an illustration studio where he was encouraged to draw cartoons and comic strips in his spare time. Following national service, he produced sketches for magazines, and later worked as a freelance designer and illustrator in advertising.

He moved with his family to Tucson, Arizona in 1983 and then to a ranch in California. He appeared on Mister Rogers' Neighborhood episode no. 1645 where he and Fred Rogers discussed the making of a page in a Spot book.

He was appointed Officer of the Order of the British Empire (OBE) in the 2008 New Year Honours for his contributions to child literacy. Hill died on 6 June 2014, at his home in California at the age of 86.

He and his second wife Gillian had two children, Christopher and Jane.

== Where's Spot? ==
Hill created a story of a dog named Spot in 1976 for his son Christopher. In that first book, Spot was hiding behind little flaps which could be lifted by small children, an innovation which he devised. Hill said that he aimed to recognise "that children have far more intelligence and style than many adults credit them with", and to invite them to experience "ideas which were just outside their experience yet were basic enough to be understood."

After a friend introduced him to a literary agent, his first book Where's Spot? was published in 1980 by Frederick Warne & Co and quickly became popular. He then produced a series of similar books and expanded the range of characters. His books are estimated to have sold more than 60 million copies. The stories were translated into 60 languages, and led to a series of animated stories for television as well as merchandise.
