= Jevon O'Neill =

English film director

- Education: University of Manchester
- Occupations: Director; producer; writer

Jevon O'Neill, from Blackpool, England, is an English writer, director and producer of feature films and television advertisements.

== Career ==
In 1983, O'Neill completed courses in drama and film at the University of Manchester. After college, he directed and produced TV commercials for a variety of companies, including United Biscuits, Pearl Assurance, British Gas, Nike, The Sunday Times, and others.

O'Neill's first film, Bob's Weekend, was distributed by Paramount and shown on BBC1.

His second film, Out of Season starring Dennis Hopper and Gina Gershon, filmed in Romania. It screened at The Hollywood Film Festival in 2004 and was selected to show at the festival alongside potential blockbusters.

In March 2000, O'Neill was scheduled to direct the feature film Mr Benn, with actor John Hannah playing the role of Mr Benn and Ben Kingsley playing the shopkeeper. O'Neill's film company, Erinfilm, purchased the movie rights from Mr Benn TV series' creator David McKee. Winchester Entertainment, based in London, is producing the film.

== Awards ==
In 1996, Bob's Weekend won the Sutherland Trophy from the British Film Institute Awards.

Bob's Weekend was a 1996 nominee for the Emden Film Award at the Emden International Film Festival.

== Personal life ==
O'Neill lives in Edlesborough with his children and wife.

== Filmography ==
- Bob's Weekend (1996, as writer, producer, and director)
- Out of Season (2004, as writer and director)
