= Duncan Lamont (musician) =

British saxophonist (1931–2019)

- Born: 4 July 1931; Greenock, Scotland
- Died: 2 July 2019 (aged 87) London
- Genres: Jazz
- Occupations: Musician; Saxophonist; Composer; Bandleader
- Instruments: Saxophone; Flute; Clarinet
- Years active: 1940s–2019

Duncan Lamont (4 July 1931 – 2 July 2019) was a saxophonist, composer and bandleader active for many years in London's Soho jazz scene. His soundtracks include the music to the 1970s children's television animation series Mr Benn.

== Early career ==
Lamont was born in Greenock, the son of a shipyard worker. He began learning the trumpet at the age of seven because “it was the cheapest instrument I could get – it cost 30 shillings”. He started playing with local dance bands while still at school. After a time working in the shipyards, Lamont moved to London to play with Kenny Graham's Afro Cubists and (switching to tenor saxophone) with the Johnny Keating band in 1957. In 1958 he toured the US with Vic Lewis. During the 1960s he became a member of the Johnny Scott Quintet.

== Soho jazz ==
For several decades Lamont worked as a freelance musician (on flute and clarinet as well as saxophone), based around Archer Street in Soho and playing in the surrounding jazz clubs. He often performed with British bands accompanying American vocalists, including Fred Astaire, Tony Bennett, Bing Crosby, Sammy Davis Jr., Marlene Dietrich, Peggy Lee and (for 19 seasons) with Frank Sinatra. He also played with touring bandleaders such as Count Basie, Benny Goodman and Henry Mancini. Lamont led his own band for 11 years. He worked on recording and performing projects with Kenny Wheeler for many decades, including on Wheeler's 1974 album Song for Someone.

== Composer ==
Lamont was a prolific composer of concert works, library music, television music and songs. The Young Person's Guide to the Contemporary Jazz Orchestra, composed for a BBC broadcast in 1979, provides a jazz orchestra alternative to Benjamin Britten's classical variations, also for orchestra and narrator. The Sherlock Holmes Suite was commissioned by the City of London to commemorate the first appearance of Sherlock Holmes in The Strand magazine, and featured his friend and collaborator Spike Milligan as narrator. It was recorded for the BBC in 1989.

Lamont began to record orchestral music for the KPM and Bruton music libraries in the 1970s. He became part of the library music recording group WASP, along with Steve Gray on piano, Brian Bennett on drums, Dave Richmond on bass and Clive Hicks on guitar. His music for television included the theme tunes for the BBC television children's animation series Mr Benn (using the name Don Warren) and Spot.

Blossom Dearie, Natalie Cole, Cleo Laine and Norma Winstone were among those who recorded his songs. Cleo Laine ended her Carnegie Hall show with his Not You Again. A CD of his songs by Nancy Marano was released in 1995. Frank Holder also recorded a set of the songs in the mid-1990s. In 2020 Tina May issued another song selection.

In May 2019 just over four weeks before he died, Lamont returned to the town of his birth, Greenock, to perform a homecoming gig with singers Esther Bennett and Daniela Clynes. His son Duncan Lamont Jr. stated, "There was real sense of everything having come full circle."

== Personal life ==
Lamont met his wife, the vocalist Bridget Harrison, when he moved to London in the early 1950s. She died in 2005. They had two sons: Duncan Junior and Ross. Duncan Lamont Junior is also a saxophonist and bandleader. Lamont died shortly after performing in a tribute concert of his music at the 606 Club in London two days short of his 88th birthday.

== Selected works ==
Orchestral Suites

- The Young Person’s Guide to the Jazz Orchestra
- Carnival of the Animals
- Soho Suite (commissioned for The Soho Festival)
- Sherlock Holmes Suite, commissioned for the Festival of London
- Cinderella
- Carmen
- Buddy Rich Suite
- Porgy and Bess
- Beautiful Ireland, Ulster Youth Jazz Orchestra for the Londonderry Jazz Festival

Library Music

- Battle (from KPM 1157), used in The Sweeney
- Four Seasons, suite (side one of Bruton BRD 1)
- Pressure Point (from Bruton BRS 8), used in SpongeBob SquarePants, Series 2, Ep. 15
- Slow Spirals (from KPM 1176), used in Alcohol (Boulton-Hawker Films Ltd, 1979)
- Strange Moons, New Suns (from KPM 1162)

Television

- Mr Benn
- King Rollo
- Towser
- Ric the Raven
- Victor and Maria
- Spot

Songs

- "52nd Street"
- "A Great Day in Harlem"
- "Carousel"
- "Fred Astaire"
- "Hymn to Jobim"
- "I Didn't Know You"
- "I Told You So"
- "Just Another Sunday"
- "London at Midnight"
- "Manhattan in the Rain"
- "Not You Again"
- "Now We're Just Friends"
- "Over and Over"
- "So Little Time"
- "The Apartment"
- "The Darker Side of the Rainbow"
- "There Ain't Nothing Like the Blues"
- "Where Were You in April?"
- "Your Waltz"
