= King Rollo =

Television series

- Genre: Animated series
- Written by: David McKee
- Narrated by: Ray Brooks
- Composer: Duncan Lamont
- Country of origin: United Kingdom
- Original language: English
- No. of seasons: 1
- No. of episodes: 13

Production
- Running time: 5 minutes
- Production company: King Rollo Films

Original release
- Network: BBC1
- Release: 1 October – 24 December 1980

King Rollo is a children's character, created by David McKee in 1980. He is the main character in a series of books, animations narrated by Ray Brooks, and a comic strip in the magazine Buttons. Thirteen episodes of the animation were produced in 1980 by McKee's own King Rollo Films, where the character is the company's mascot and namesake and were originally shown as part of the pre-school 'See-Saw' strand.

Rollo himself is a childlike king who is always in need of advice and assistance from his friends. Among these are The Magician (a father figure); Cook (the king's cook, a mother figure, who was arguably the real ruler of the kingdom); his neighbour and girlfriend, Queen Gwen; King Frank; and Rollo's cat, Hamlet, who was generally portrayed as wiser than Rollo himself.

The animations used the same colourful cut-out paper look as McKee's other works, such as Mr Benn. The 2D animation style saved on production costs. The characters' legs would rotate outwards when walking until they were at right-angles to the sides of their body.

== Episodes ==
No.	Title	Original release date
1	"The Bread"	1 October 1980
2	"The Playroom"	8 October 1980
3	"The Bath"	15 October 1980
4	"The Dishes"	22 October 1980
5	"The New Shoes"	29 October 1980
6	"The Breakfast"	5 November 1980
7	"The Tree"	12 November 1980
8	"The Comic"	19 November 1980
9	"King Frank"	26 November 1980
10	"The Birthday"	3 December 1980
11	"The Balloons"	10 December 1980
12	"The Search"	17 December 1980
13	"The Dog"	24 December 1980

== DVD ==
On 28 October 2013, 'Demand DVD' released all thirteen episodes on a DVD called 'The Adventures of King Rollo', (ASIN B00DZT4838).

== Books ==
- King Rollo and the New Shoes (1979)
- King Rollo and the Bread (1979)
- King Rollo and the Birthday (1979)
- King Rollo and the Balloons (1980)
- King Rollo and the Tree (1980)
- King Rollo and the Dishes (1980)
- King Rollo and the Bath (1981)
- King Rollo and King Frank (1981)
- King Rollo and the Search (1981)
- King Rollo and the Playroom (1982)
- King Rollo and the Breakfast (1982)
- King Rollo and the Dog (1982)
- King Rollo and the Mask (1982)
- King Rollo's Letter and Other Stories (1984): collection containing: King Rollo and the Letter; King Rollo and the Bush; King Rollo and the Present; King Rollo and the Tent
- King Rollo's Winter (1986): board book
- King Rollo's Spring (1987): board book
- King Rollo's Summer (1988): board book
- King Rollo's Autumn (1988): board book
- King Rollo and Santa's Beard (1990): also published as King Rollo's Christmas
- King Rollo and the New Stockings (2001)

=== Collections ===
- The Adventures of King Rollo (1982): King Rollo and the New Shoes; King Rollo and the Birthday; King Rollo and the Bread; King Rollo and the Tree
- The Further Adventures of King Rollo (1983): King Rollo and the Dishes; King Rollo and the Balloons; King Rollo and King Frank; King Rollo and the Search
- King Rollo's Playroom and Other Stories (1984): King Rollo and the Playroom; King Rollo and the Breakfast; King Rollo and the Dog; King Rollo and the Mask
- The Adventures of King Rollo (2016): collection of separate hardback books containing: King Rollo and the New Shoes; King Rollo and the Bread; King Rollo and the Birthday; King Rollo and King Frank
