= King Rollo Films =

Animation production company

King Rollo Films Limited
- Type: Private company limited by shares
- Industry: stop-motion animation CGI animation
- Founded: 1978
- Founder: David McKee
- Headquarters: Honiton, England, UK
- Key people: David McKee
- Website: kingrollofilms.co.uk

King Rollo Films Limited, known as King Rollo Films, is a preschool animation production company established in 1978 by children's book author and illustrator David McKee that produces cartoons for children's television. Their studios are based in Honiton, England.

== History ==
King Rollo Films is an independent animation studio led by Leo Nielsen.

The studio won a BAFTA for Maisy, a BAFTA nomination for Humf and a Daytime EMMY Nomination for Mama Mirabelle's Home Movies.

In 2004, the company split, with the Devon-based production arm and a rights-holding arm separating.

== Productions ==
=== Television series ===
Title	Year(s)	Network	Notes
King Rollo	1980	BBC1	
Victor & Maria	1983	ITV	
Towser	1984	ITV	
The Adventures of Spot	1987, 1993	BBC1	
Ric	1989	ITV; Channel 4 Sat.1	Co-produced with Ravensburger Film + TV GmbH
Hullaballoo	1994	Channel 4	Animation for the Pip the Mouse and Buddy the Elephant segments. Produced by Dorling Kindersley Vision and Crystalrowe Ltd
Maisy	1999–2000	ITV (CITV)	Co-produced with Universal Pictures Visual Programming; Currently owned by NBCUniversal
Fimbles	2002-2004	CBeebies	Animation for Roly Mo storybook segments, show produced by Novel Entertainment
Paz	2003–2006	ITV (CITV); Discovery Kids	Co-produced with Telescreen, Egmont Imagination (Season 1), Telescreen (Season 2) and Discovery Kids; Currently owned by Warner Bros. Discovery
Wide-Eye	2003	CBeebies	Co-produced with Abbey Home Media
The Roly Mo Show	2004-2006	CBeebies	Animation for Fimbles segments and Roly Mo storybook segments, show produced by Novel Entertainment
Mama Mirabelle's Home Movies	2007–2008	CBeebies; PBS Kids	Co-produced with National Geographic Kids Entertainment and the BBC; Currently owned by The Walt Disney Company and National Geographic Society
Humf	2009–2010	Nick Jr.	Co-produced with Rubber Duck Entertainment
Poppy Cat	2011	Nick Jr.	Co-produced with Coolabi Productions and Klasky Csupo (U.S. production)
