= Ric (TV series) =

Children's television series

- Also known as: RiC the Raven
- Genre: Children's series Animated series
- Written by: David McKee
- Directed by: Leo Nielsen
- Music by: Duncan Lamont
- Countries of origin: United Kingdom; Germany
- Original language: English
- No. of seasons: 1
- No. of episodes: 52

Production
- Producer: Clive Juster
- Production companies: King Rollo Films; Ravensburger Film + TV

Original release
- Network: ITV (United Kingdom); Channel 4 (United Kingdom); Sat.1 (Germany)
- Release: July 21, 1989 – 1991

Ric (stylized as RiC, also known as RiC the Raven in English and RiC – Der Rabe in German) is a children's animated series produced by King Rollo Films Ltd in partnership with Ravensburger Film + TV GmbH. The series has 52 episodes and follows the adventures of RiC, a blue raven which appears in a different role in each episode, such as a pilot, viking, or thief. Before the series appeared, the character was featured in a series of 30-second shorts produced by King Rollo Films Ltd. in the late 80's.

The series aired in the United Kingdom on ITV and Channel 4, Fox Kids in Central and Eastern Europe, and on JimJam internationally. Due to the large popularity the series has in Germany, Your Family Entertainment AG, who is also the copyright owner of the series, launched a free-to-air television channel with the same name, being available in German countries and with a localized feed for Slovakia.

== Episodes ==
Number	Episode name
01	Castle
02	Robin Hood
03	Island
04	Pilot
05	Ghost
06	Removals
07	Butterfly
08	Sombrero
09	Gondola
10	Rescue
11	Decorating
12	Desert
13	Thief
14	Ricshaw
15	On the Road
16	Scouts
17	Circus
18	The Crown
19	Fishing
20	Library
21	Rollerskates
22	Pony Express
23	Musketeer
24	Cuckoo
25	Viking
26	Telephone
27	Apple
28	Diving
29	Ski Jump
30	Sports Day
31	Vending Machine
32	Egypt
33	Golf
34	Knight
35	Basketball
36	Zoo
37	Fire Engine
38	Parachute
39	Pirates
40	Kung Fu
41	The Big Match
42	Troy
43	Eskimos
44	Babysitter
45	Tarzan
46	Lighthouse
47	Wizard
48	Lunch
49	Ali Baba
50	Piano
51	Frankenstein
52	Space
