= The Paz Show =

British-American preschool television series

- Created by: Mary Murphy
- Starring: Tim Lagasse; Rebecca Nagan; Anton Rodgers; Margot Caroni; Charlotte Bellamy; Liam McMahon
- Countries of origin: United States; United Kingdom
- Original language: English
- No. of seasons: 2
- No. of episodes: 80

Production
- Running time: 8 minutes (regular; North America); 5 minutes (without live-action segments; international)
- Production companies: King Rollo Films; Open Mind Productions (live action segments); Egmont Imagination (season 1); Telescreen BV (season 2)

Original release
- Network: ITV (CITV)
- Release: February 24, 2003 – November 25, 2006

Related
- Wilbur; Maisy

The Paz Show (also known as Paz the Penguin stylized PAZ) is a live action/animated preschool television series that debuted on February 24, 2003, on Discovery Kids and TLC in the United States. It also aired on ITV in the United Kingdom. The series is a co-production between British studio King Rollo Films, Egmont Imagination (Season 1)/Telescreen BV (Season 2), and Discovery Communications in association with Discovery Kids. The series was based on a series of books written and illustrated by Mary Murphy.

Between the series' cancellation and October 8, 2010, the series continued to rerun on the Ready Set Learn! block.

== Cast and characters ==
=== Main cast ===
- Tim Lagasse as Paz, a playful little penguin with an American accent who is the main character of the series. He is a fuzzy five-year-old penguin, is as optimistic as he is curious, it is not unusual for Paz, in his enthusiasm, to encounter a few roadblocks on his way to adventure, but he sometimes has his mother, Big Penguin, his grandfather, Pappy, and his friends to encourage him on the way. He is occasionally seen playing his trumpeter in a few episodes, his trumpetar is an orange kazoo-like instrument with sitar strings, when played, it plays a similar tune matching the series instrumentals. Starting from 2003, he starred as the mascot of the Ready Set Learn! block until 2010 when the Discovery Kids channel relaunched as the Hub Network. He has a black coat and feet, a white face and a belly, and a yellow chest and a beak.
- Rebecca Nagan as Big Penguin, Paz's loving single mother who works as an architect. She seems to speak in a British accent in a few episodes. Paz's father is never shown in the series. She has a similar appearance as Paz, only to have a yellow lining around her stomach. Starting from Locket, she has been shown wearing a bronze locket that she had inherited from her own mother with a photo of her son in it. Sarah-Jane Honeywell is the body performer in the live action segments.
- Anton Rodgers as Pappy, a macaroni penguin as Paz's grandfather and Big Penguin's possible father who is a retired explorer. Pappy lives alone in colorful house that resembles a Mediterranean house which was revealed to have location-themed rooms in Senses besides his bedroom and guest room which were only shown in I Can't Sleep. The episode, Fun With Pappy reveals that Pappy resembled Paz when he was his age while currently resembling his own grandfather. Pappy is somewhat pretty talented at playing the tuba, and occasionally plays songs for Paz and his friends. He is an elder penguin with a pair of yellow crests that matches the big spot on his chest and sometimes appears with a red vest jacket and a blue and red explorer helmet.
- Margot Caroni as Pig, a sassy pig with an Italian accent. She is shown to be very talented at playing the violin in Band Wagon and great at tap-dancing in Right Moves.
- Charlotte Bellamy as Rabbit, an outgoing rabbit with a British accent. She is highly energetic and likes to drum on trash can lids. She has a little sister named Carrot. She is white with an orange right ear and a tail.
- Liam McMahon as Dog, a shy dog with an Irish accent and yellow orange fur. Despite appearing in a few initial episodes, Dog seems to be Paz's new neighbor in New Dog on the Block. He wears a magenta collar and is often seen playing a maraca on his tail.

=== One-time appearing characters ===
- Maria Darling as Adelie, Paz's imaginary Antarctic friend who appears in Here We Go!. She lives in Paz's South Pole fantasy world. Her role was to help Paz find his sled in the snow. When they have found the lost sled which was found on top of a whale's blowhole, they go for a little swim in the whale's frozen lake before retrieving it from the whale. Adelie was last seen riding on the sled with Paz, before saying goodbye to him as he concludes his fantasy.
- Colin McFarlane as the frog, a boastful amphibian who appears in The Great Race. Paz challenges him to a race, which he is certain that he can win because he is the fastest racer in the world. He ends up losing after stopping to pose for a painting, proving that being the fastest does not always guarantee victory.

== Episodes ==
- Season 1: 52 episodes - 24 February 2003 - 23 February 2004
- Season 2: 28 episodes - 13 May - 25 November 2006

Season 1 (2003–2004)

1. The Right Moves - 24 February 2003
2. Big Top - 3 March 2003
3. Seesaw - 10 March 2003
4. Kite Flight - 17 March 2003
5. On Ice - 24 March 2003
6. Too Little - 31 March 2003
7. Here We Go - 7 April 2003
8. Paz Gets A Job - 14 April 2003
9. Not Tired - 21 April 2003
10. Little Penguin's Treasure Map - 28 April 2003
11. Paz's Red Scooter - 5 May 2003
12. Our Fine's Feathered Friend - 12 May 2003
13. Spiders - 19 May 2003
14. Spring Has Sprung - 26 May 2003
15. Memory Jeweler - 2 June 2003
16. Seaworthy - 9 June 2003
17. The Big Egg - 16 June 2003
18. Hopping Mad - 23 June 2003
19. The Big Box - 30 June 2003
20. Brave Old World - 7 July 2003
21. Let's Call The Whole Thing Off - 14 July 2003
22. One's Company - 21 July 2003
23. The Play's The Thing - 28 July 2003
24. The Case Of The Missing Voice - 4 August 2003
25. In The Dark - 11 August 2003
26. Food For Thought - 18 August 2003
27. Band Wagon - 25 August 2003
28. Am I Blue? - 1 September 2003
29. My Senses - 8 September 2003
30. Sick In Bed - 15 September 2003

== Production ==
Paz was announced on May 25, 2001, when Danish production division Egmont Imagination was developing its animated production state and had partnered with British animation studio King Rollo Films to produce a pre-school television series Little Penguin based on the book series by Irish author Mary Murphy with Egmont Imagination would handle distribution to the series.

One year later on September 9, 2002, Egmont Imagination and British animation studio King Rollo Films had commissioned the series to Discovery's children television network Discovery Kids and fellow channel TLC to broadcast the adaptation of Mary Murphy's book series now entitled The Paz Show for the latter's Ready Set Learn! block.

In March 2003, Dutch children's production & distribution outfit Telescreen acquired Egmont Imagination's programming catalogue from Egmont Group including the upcoming television series Little Penguin with Telescreen taking over production & development for the series including distribution rights.

== Awards and nominations ==
- Silver Honor - 2005 Parents' Choice Award
- Emmy Winner - 2005 Humanitas Prize for Children's Television (episode Things Change by James Still)
- Nominee - 32nd Daytime Emmy Awards (2005) for Pre-school Children's Series
- Nominee - 33rd Daytime Emmy Awards (2006) for Pre-school Children's Series
- Nominee - 34th Daytime Emmy Awards (2007) for Outstanding Pre-school Children's Series
