= Poppy Cat (TV series) =

American-British television series

- Genre: Adventure; Preschool; Children's series Animated series
- Based on: Poppy Cat by Lara Jones
- Directed by: Leo Nielsen
- Voices of: Cindy Robinson; Cake Charles; Alicyn Packard; Katie Leigh; Donald King; Stephanie Darcy; Rick Zieff; Teresa Gallagher
- Narrated by: Cindy Robinson
- Composer: Oliver Davis
- Countries of origin: United Kingdom; United States
- Original language: English
- No. of series: 2
- No. of episodes: 104

Production
- Executive producers: Brad Hood; Eryk Casemiro; Kate Boutilier; Julian Scott; Zoe Bamsey
- Producer: Leo Nielsen
- Running time: 11 minutes
- Production companies: King Rollo Films; Coolabi Productions; Cake Entertainment; Ingenious Media (season 2)

Original release
- Network: Nick Jr.
- Release: 2 May 2011 – 31 October 2015

Poppy Cat (alternatively known as The Extraordinary Adventures of Poppy Cat) is a British-American preschool animated television series, which first aired on May 2, 2011 and last aired on October 31, 2015. It is based on a series of books created by British illustrator and writer Lara Jones, and is a co-production of King Rollo Films, Coolabi Productions, Cake Entertainment and Ingenious Media (season 2) for Nick Jr. in the UK and Sprout (season 2) in the U.S., and was dubbed by Klasky Csupo for U.S. production.

== Premise ==
The series centers on Poppy, a young neckerchief-wearing kitten heroine, leading her eccentric team of friends who are stuffed animals – Alma the bunny kit, Zuzu the Dalmatian puppy, an owl named Owl and Mo the mouse – who belong to a little girl named Lara, who is the narrator of the series. They walk upright, talk and go on many extraordinary adventures to faraway lands of wonder by any kind of transportation they need that matches her neckerchief, like a sailing ship, a train, an aeroplane, a hot-air balloon, a submarine, a rocket ship, a campervan, a horse-drawn carriage and their very own car. But they have to stay away from Egbert, a badger, who is rude and makes fun of them.

== Characters ==
=== Main ===
- Lara (voiced in the UK by Maddie Page in the first season, Alisha Holmes in the second season, and in the U.S. by Cindy Robinson, credited as Gigi Sarroino) is the narrator of the show. She is a six-year-old girl with an active imagination who writes and reads stories and draws pictures about the adventures of her pet cat, Poppy, the beloved young kitten leader and her eccentric team of friends, Alma the bunny kit, Zuzu the puppy, Owl and Mo the baby mouse, and not Egbert the nasty badger.
- Poppy Cat (voiced in the UK by Joanna Page in the first season and Jessica Ransom in the second season, and in the U.S. by Haley Charles, credited as Cake Charles) is the main protagonist in the series. She is the leader of the group. She is a feisty, imaginative, cheerful and happy-go-lucky young orange ginger tabby kitten with a big white face and long whiskers and she wears a magic multi-colored neckerchief that takes her and her stuffed animal friends on extraordinary adventures by any type of vehicle they need that matches her neckerchief pattern. She's an adventurer, a heroine, an imagineer, a dreamer, and a devoted best friend to her stuffed animal friends. Poppy's heroic gusto and unquenchable curiosity propel each adventure for her and her friends, often leading to unexpected experiences and discoveries. She is highly conscious of those around her and will go to the ends of the Earth to solve a problem. Poppy likes adventure, but her top priority is always her friends, which is why she is the unspoken leader of her little gang. She's the glue that holds them all together. On her birthday adventure, she wears a pink hat and serves as the Birthday Captain. Her catchphrases are "Would you like to come along?", "Would you like to play?", "Hoop-dee-doo!", "Hooray!", "That's a great idea!", "Come on, everybody!", "Okey-doke, we're off!" and "But first, we're going to need...(type of vehicles)!"
- Zuzu (voiced in the UK by Joanna Ruiz and in the U.S. by Katie Leigh) is a speedy young black and white plush toy Dalmatian puppy with black spots. He is Poppy's best friend who loves doing tricks on his skateboard and laughs very loudly. Zuzu is an adrenaline junkie who is competitive, loud, and practically fearless. He is quite impulsive and cool, quick to laugh at a joke, impatient when it comes to manners and protocol, and a good sport most of the time.
- Alma (voiced in the UK by Nicola Hornett and in the U.S. by Alicyn Packard) is a giggly young pink and white plush toy European rabbit kit with a big pink tummy, pink circles on her cheeks, and in the US dub, she speaks in a Western accent. She often arrives at Poppy's breathless and worked up about a situation, though in the face of danger, she can be quite blithe, to Mo's chagrin. Alma, who fancies herself quite a singer, often coaxes her best friend Mo to sing a duet. Mo has an unspoken little crush on Alma and worries about her a little bit. The chatty rabbit is a loyal, affectionate friend who likes jewelry, the color pink, and picnics. She treasures a special seashell that Mo gave her to hear the ocean. In the mystery-solving adventures, she wears glasses with white fluffy eyebrows and red nose and a black pointy beard. Her catchphrases are "Oh, Poppy!", "Hoop-dee-doo!" and "Hooray!" She is implied to have numerous relatives, including a little brother named Chester.
- Mo (voiced in the UK by Charlie Cameron, and in the U.S. by Stephanie Darcy) is a feisty baby pink stuffed toy mouse with a yellow head, pink ears and a striped tail. He loves singing songs with Alma and eating cheese sandwiches, wears a red and green striped tanktop and is Alma's best friend who never gets squashed. In the mystery-solving adventures, he wears a black mustache. He is the youngest of the group.
- Owl (voiced in the UK by Chris Neill, and in the U.S. by Donald King) is a know-it-all brown stuffed toy Eurasian eagle owl who wears a turquoise and purple striped wool hat with a purple pompom on top. He considers himself an expert on almost everything, knowledge that he has gleaned from books or his travels. Though he has traveled very far from his comfortable house, Owl's directions are usually comically convoluted. Owl may complain about Zuzu's inadvertent path of destruction, but he has a soft spot for each of his friends. He's especially supportive of the timid Mo, and like everyone, has great respect for Poppy Cat. Owl likes the finer things in life: a soft coconut-leaf nest, a cup of hot chocolate, and a quick nap whenever he can catch one. He also likes to perform. He is the oldest of the group.
  - In the episode "Royal Toad", his singing voice is provided by Spanish tenor opera legend Plácido Domingo.
- Egbert (voiced in both the UK and U.S. by Teresa Gallagher) is the main antagonist of the series. He is a grumpy, short-tempered, arrogant, rude, stout, sneaky and adenoidal stuffed toy European badger cub and the master of disguise with an English accent in both the UK and US. He is very desperate to be part of the group, although only by his rules, but rather than accept their invitation to play (or go on an adventure), Egbert always has 'top secret stuff' to go to on his own way, only to always meet the group again, in their adventure. There, he will insert himself into their journey, costumed as a ridiculous antagonist of his own invention. Depending upon their location, Egbert may fancy himself to be a pirate, troll, or sea monster. His nerdy, eccentric energy elicits groans from everyone but Poppy. Egbert pretends not to know 'this Egbert', and always stays in character. He hates their friends' fun.

=== Supporting ===
- Gilda (voiced in both the UK and U.S. by Teresa Gallagher) is a scatter-brained pigeon with an English accent.
- Rocket Cat (voiced in the UK by Richard Jones, and in the U.S. by Rick Zieff, credited as Danny Katiana) is Poppy Cat's favorite superhero. He appears in numerous episodes each time Poppy Cat and her friends visit outer space.
- Mother Bumblebird (voiced in the UK by Teresa Gallagher, and in the U.S. by Lara Jill Miller) and The Bumblebirds are a family of yellow long-necked birds that live in a big purple nest in the snowy mountains or in the sky.

=== Minor ===
- Ravi (voiced in the UK by Teresa Gallagher and in the U.S. by Kodi Smit-McPhee) is Poppy's pen pal from Tiger Island. He is a young and friendly plush toy tiger cub who has a broken arm and can't play with the other tigers, and only Poppy and her friends would play with him. In later episodes, however, Ravi’s arm is healed and his cast is gone.
- Chester (voiced in the UK by Teresa Gallagher and in the U.S. by Nancy Cartwright) is Alma's baby brother who is four years old. He is a baby white and blue plush toy rabbit kit boy with a big blue tummy and a Western accent who occasionally goes on adventures with his older sister Alma and the rest of the crew.

== Episodes ==
Series	Episodes	Originally released		
Series	Episodes	First released	Last released	Network
1	52	2 May 2011 (UK); 7 November 2011 (U.S.)	11 July 2011 (UK); 26 March 2012 (U.S.)	Nick Jr. (UK); Universal Kids (U.S.)
2	52	8 September 2014 (UK); 25 October 2014 (U.S.)	31 October 2015 (UK); 30 January 2016 (U.S.)	Nick Jr. (UK); Universal Kids (U.S.)

=== Season 1 (2011) ===
No. overall	No. in season	Title	Written by	Original release date	U.S. air date	Prod. code
1	1	"Tricky Cricket"	Kate Boutilier & Eryk Casemiro	2 May 2011	7 November 2011	113
Zuzu is disappointed when his new cricket does not sing as promised; Poppy suggests they head out in the hot air balloon to find a place the cricket likes to sing.
2	2	"Space Monsters"	Kate Boutilier & Eryk Casemiro	3 May 2011	11 November 2011	103
After Alma confides she had a dream in which Zuzu was a space monster, Poppy takes them to outer space in her rocket.
3	3	"Yodel Mountain"	Sam Dransfield	4 May 2011	2 January 2012	122
Alma is missing one rare flower in her pressed collection, so Poppy suggests a train ride to Yodel Mountain, where they find the 'Alpine Honey Blossom'.
4	4	"Lost Balloon"	Kate Boutilier & Eryk Casemiro	5 May 2011	9 November 2011	106
After Mo lets go of his new balloon, the gang take to the skies in Poppy's airplane, where they pass a flying Gilda.
5	5	"Cloud Song"	Unknown	6 May 2011	26 January 2012	141
When Alma forgets a song she made up about clouds, Poppy suggests they go to the Castle of Songs in the hot air balloon to find it.
6	6	"Runaway Turtle"	Unknown	9 May 2011	10 November 2011	105
When Owl finds a lost baby turtle in his swimsuit, the gang head to the ocean in their submarine to find its mother.
7	7	"Dear Rocket Cat"	Unknown	10 May 2011	8 November 2011	107
After watching an episode of their favourite TV show, Rocket Cat, Mo shows them the letter he has written to his hero.
8	8	"Buried Treasure"	Unknown	11 May 2011	14 November 2011	101
When Alma loses her new necklace, Poppy takes them on a ship to find buried treasure with the help of her pirate treasure map.
9	9	"Moon Museum"	Unknown	12 May 2011	25 January 2012	123
After Owl suggests that Mo's precious collection would be safest in a museum, Poppy takes them to the Moon in her rocket.
10	10	"Golden Guitar"	Unknown	13 May 2011	6 January 2012	121
When Zuzu fails to play guitar well, Owl suggests they search for the 'golden guitar' found in the Desert of the Crazy Sun.
11	11	"Pearl Hunt"	Unknown	16 May 2011	12 December 2011	129
When Mo accidentally loses one of the pearl's in Alma's new necklace, the gang head in the ship to Oyster Bay to go diving for a new pearl.
12	12	"Going Coconuts"	Unknown	16 May 2011	15 November 2011	110
When Owl's nest is accidentally destroyed, Poppy takes the gang to Coconut Island in her plane to find coconut leaves for a new one.
13	13	"Cheese Mountain"	Unknown	16 May 2011	16 November 2011	102
Poppy leads her friends on a hot air balloon ride to Cheese Mountain so Alma can practice her French.
14	14	"Pickle Springs"	Unknown	17 May 2011	17 November 2011	109
When Mo gets the hiccups, the gang is off to Pickle Springs for Owl's cure: a sip of pickle juice.
15	15	"Marshmallow Mines"	Unknown	18 May 2011	18 November 2011	116
While watching 'Rocket Cat', there is a powercut, leaving Poppy and friends to worry about the fate of their hero, who is trapped in the Marshmallow Mines.
16	16	"Big Bubbles"	Unknown	19 May 2011	4 January 2012	138
Poppy and her friends blow bubbles in the garden during which Mo proves to be the champion bubble-blower but an inept Zuzu pouts that bubbles are no fun because he is having trouble blowing them. She takes them to Tiger Island to meet a young tiger named Ravi and help him cheer up with them.
17	17	"Jungle Butterfly"	Unknown	20 May 2011	21 November 2011	117
After a chrysalis hatches a beautiful jungle butterfly, Poppy and the gang decide to take it back to Flutterby Falls in the hot air balloon so it can be with its friends.
18	18	"Missing Keys"	Unknown	23 May 2011	23 November 2011	104
When Mo's keys fall into the pond, Poppy takes them on a submarine voyage to look for them.
19	19	"Flower Power"	Unknown	24 May 2011	25 November 2011	111
When Alma's new perfume (a gift from Mo) is accidentally spilled, Poppy suggests a trip to the Elephant Jungle to search for the Giant Lily.
20	20	"Forgotten Circus"	Unknown	25 May 2011	13 February 2012	152
When a poster blows in from the Snowy Circus, Mo confesses he has never been to a circus, so the gang head off for the Arctic in the train.
21	21	"Royal Toad"	Unknown	26 May 2011	28 November 2011	112
When Alma shows up with a toad named Cecil, who is late for a royal wedding, Poppy uses her horse and carriage to take them to the Warty Woods.
22	22	"Special Delivery"	Unknown	27 May 2011	27 January 2012	144
When Mo assumes the role of Postman for the day, he must deliver a letter to Treehouse Trevor who lives in the Tanglewood Forest.
23	23	"Chilly Hills"	Unknown	30 May 2011	29 November 2011	115
Zuzu is so disappointed that there are no good hills for sledging on his new toboggan that Poppy takes them to Chilly Hills in the campervan.
24	24	"Space Race"	Unknown	31 May 2011	30 November 2011	119
After Zuzu eats the last of Mo's new jellybeans, the gang is off in their rocketship for Planet Ring-O-Beans, to obtain new ones.
25	25	"Mt. Zuzu"	Unknown	1 June 2011	13 December 2011	127
When Zuzu learns that mountains are named after the person who discovers them, the gang heads off in the hot air balloon to find an unnamed mountain on which to plant a flag.
26	26	"Snowman Rescue"	Unknown	2 June 2011	22 December 2011	118
While sledging on a hot day, the gang discover a melting snowman and decide to take him to the North Pole in their sailing ship.
27	27	"Skateboard Star"	Unknown	3 June 2011	TBA	120
When Zuzu wishes he could see his new skateboard trick, Poppy suggests a trip in the campervan to Twisty Tree Ridge, where they can make a video.
28	28	"Sunken Ship"	Unknown	6 June 2011	7 February 2012	145
When Poppy and her friends decide they need gold for their statue they are building Cecil the Toad King, they go off in the submarine to the Sea of Shipwrecks to find a sunken ship with treasure.
29	29	"Bad Robot"	Unknown	6 June 2011	26 March 2012	135
When Rocket-Cat is trapped by a giant robot on the Ice Planet on his television show, the gang fly there in the rocketship to save him.
30	30	"Birthday Treasure"	Unknown	9 June 2011	1 January 2012	140
Poppy's friends present her with a birthday cake and gifts, including a pretty pink hat, a pop-up inflatable raft, a pair of binoculars, a trumpet and a mysterious treasure map which leads them on an adventure in the hot air balloon to Mystery Jungle.
31	31	"Mystery Gift"	Unknown	10 June 2011	6 January 2012	125
A birthday gift to 'Little Opie' drops from the sky, so Poppy and friends set off in the submarine to the depths of the ocean to find the young octopus.
32	32	"Umbrella Dance"	Unknown	13 June 2011	15 December 2011	137
A thrilled Alma performs her umbrella dance when a gust of wind whisks away her specially colored prop.
33	33	"Rare Bird"	Unknown	14 June 2011	14 December 2011	136
In the course of making what he calls a tree of birds - an art project from which hang little instant pictures of all the birds in the world - Mo finds he is missing only one - the Red-Crested Babblebird.
34	34	"Magic Beetle"	Unknown	15 June 2011	24 January 2012	133
When Alma's new magic beetle fails to grant a wish, they learn that wishes are only granted in the Enchanted Desert.
35	35	"Shooting Star"	Unknown	16 June 2011	16 December 2011	130
As the gang look for shooting stars upon which to make a wish, Poppy misses the star, so her friends insist they take the rocket and look for another one.
36	36	"Lost Stuff"	Unknown	17 June 2011	31 January 2012	146
When Zuzu loses a gift for Poppy, they decide to take the rocketship to the Planet of Lost Stuff to find it.
37	37	"Rose Cave"	Unknown	20 June 2011	11 January 2012	126
After Mo's gift of a tiny seashell to Alma does not yield the sound of the ocean, the gang set out on the ship for a faraway island to find bigger shell.
38	38	"Wise Toad"	Unknown	21 June 2011	19 December 2011	131
When Zuzu's skateboard becomes bent, Owl suggests he take it to the Skateboard Wizard, who lives in a castle on a mountain, to fix.
39	39	"Magic Show"	Unknown	22 June 2011	13 January 2012	139
When the tip of Owl's magic wand falls off right after he made Zuzu's skateboard disappear, Poppy suggests they go to the Magic Jungle to look for Abracadabra Stone for the wand.
40	40	"World Record"	Unknown	23 June 2011	TBA	148
Poppy's friends encourage her to be the first cat to fly around the world, setting a new record, so they're off in the hot air balloon to the Arctic to start the journey.
41	41	"Rocket Cat Radio"	Unknown	24 June 2011	1 February 2012	147
The gang hear a distress call from Rocket-Cat on Zuzu's new Rocket-Cat radio, and decide to take their rocket to the dark side of the Green-Cheese Moon.
42	42	"Case Closed"	Unknown	27 June 2011	9 February 2012	150
Owl is upset that his book went missing, so the gang search for clues using Mo's detective kit, and head out for the Purple Pine Forest in the car.
43	43	"Castle Queen"	Unknown	28 June 2011	16 January 2012	128
After 'Queen' Alma's cardboard castle is destroyed, Poppy takes them in a balloon to find a real castle.
44	44	"Waterfall Lane"	Unknown	29 June 2011	2 February 2012	143
While digging a swimming pool, the gang discovers a piece of tile covered in picture writing and Owl decides that his old friend, Professor Peanut could decipher it.
45	45	"Bumble Fumble"	Unknown	30 June 2011	17 January 2012	132
The gang discover a giant spotted egg which Owl identifies as that of a Bumblebird so they set off on the train for the snowy mountains.
46	46	"Welcome Walrus"	Unknown	1 July 2011	TBA	151
Zuzu excitedly presents Owl with a homemade waving wooden walrus but when the walrus mysteriously disappears, the friends head out in the hot air balloon to the mountains to see if Mother Bumblebird has seen it.
47	47	"Dolphin Dreams"	Unknown	4 July 2011	18 January 2012	108
Alma has crafted a shell necklace to give to the legendary pink dolphin, so the gang is off in the ship to find one, where they encounter Gilda.
48	48	"Drippy Forest"	Unknown	5 July 2011	6 February 2012	142
When a wigglybug (Thurston) lands on a squeamish Owl, the gang decide to take him back to the Drippy Forest in the campervan to get warm.
49	49	"Ball Games"	Unknown	6 July 2011	19 January 2012	134
Zuzu's desire to play a form of football called 'Keepy Uppy' leads the gang to fly to the Great Green, where they will have no obstacles to keep the ball in the air.
50	50	"Starry Night"	Unknown	7 July 2011	20 January 2012	124
The friends go on a camping adventure by train to the Blue Rock Mountains to see stars, but Zuzu confesses to Poppy that he's never been on his first camping trip because he's afraid of the dark.
51	51	"Cousin Alma"	Unknown	8 July 2011	10 March 2012	149
Alma's cousin Chester is playing with the gang when a giant hula-hoop falls from the sky from the planet Teeny-Tiny; they decide to take it back and show Chester outer space.
52	52	"Trumpet Trees"	Unknown	11 July 2011	23 January 2012	114
When a large, unusual leaf blows in their path, Poppy and friends head off in the hot air balloon to find the Trumpet Tree Forest.

=== Season 2 (2014–15) ===
No. overall	No. in season	Title	Written by	Original release date	U.S. air date	Prod. code
53	1	"Gloopy Ponds"	Unknown	29 September 2014	12 November 2014	TBA
Poppy Cat and his friends fly to Gloopy Ponds for some soothing mud to cure Zuzu's itch, but Rock Twinkletoes, the disco geologist (Egbert in disguise), has his eye on Zuzu's great-great-great-grandfather's prize 'gold' medallion.
54	2	"Chocolate Falls"	Unknown	30 September 2014	13 November 2014	TBA
When Owl runs out of cocoa for his morning hot drink, the friends take a train to 'Chocolate Falls', where they meet Roland, a lonely turtle who has some bad news for them.
55	3	"Acorn Time"	Unknown	1 October 2014	14 November 2014	TBA
When Owl is grumpy because his tree is so small, Mo reveals an acorn which he and Alma hope to plant for a new tree for Owl. Poppy suggests they head off in the horse and carriage to the Fast-Growing Forest.
56	4	"Giant Toothbrush"	Unknown	2 October 2014	15 November 2014	TBA
Discouraged by his small size, Mo finds a giant toothbrush on the ground and decides it must have come from a whale. Poppy suggests they head for the sea to find the owner.
57	5	"Tiger Bike"	Unknown	12 September 2014	16 November 2014	TBA
Zuzu is showing off his new bicycle when Alma delivers a letter from their friend Ravi the Tiger, who writes that his bicycle has floated out to sea.
58	6	"Olive Branch"	Unknown	15 September 2014	17 November 2014	TBA
After arguing over the rules to a game, Alma and Zuzu refuse to speak. Poppy suggests that they search for special olives which, when squeezed over people, make them friends again.
59	7	"Fantastic Gardens"	Unknown	15 July 2015	18 November 2014	TBA
Alma is discouraged by her meager carrot patch, so Owl suggests that they visit Fantastic Gardens, where vegetables grow as big as trees.
60	8	"Wooly Woods"	Unknown	17 September 2014	19 November 2014	TBA
When Zuzu shows up wearing a hand-knitted sweater that Alma made, everyone admires it so much that Alma offers to make them all sweaters.
61	9	"Polka Plains"	Unknown	18 September 2014	25 October 2014	TBA
Alma finds one pretty shoe, but when Owl identifies it as a dancing shoe from Polka Plains, it is decided the shoe should be returned to its owner, and the gang set off in the airplane.
62	10	"Jigsaw Puzzled"	Unknown	19 September 2014	27 October 2014	TBA
Alma brings a jigsaw puzzle for the group to assemble, but when they discover a piece is missing, the friends head out in the horse and carriage for Jigsaw Castle, where lost puzzle pieces are said to show up.
63	11	"Pillow Valley"	Unknown	22 September 2014	26 October 2014	TBA
Hilary the hedgehog has not been able to hibernate and her snoring is keeping Mo awake and making the little mouse grumpy. The gang tries to find a soft place for Hilary to sleep.
64	12	"Dressing Up"	Unknown	23 September 2014	28 October 2014	TBA
The gang are rehearsing for a play written by Poppy. Zuzu is not happy with his role, but there is a more pressing problem - the costumes have been eaten by moths.
65	13	"Underwater Picnic"	Unknown	24 September 2014	29 October 2014	TBA
Zuzu and Alma want to do different things, so Poppy proposes a compromise. Zuzu and the friends set off in search of Speedy Sam the turtle, while Alma finds an unusual location to try out her new picnic set.
66	14	"Slippery Planet"	Unknown	25 September 2014	30 October 2014	TBA
A capsule drops into the garden containing a letter from a mysterious 'adventurer' named Ernie. He wants a pen-pal, so the gang set off on an expedition in a rocket to other worlds to other worlds, where Mo learns a valuable lesson.
67	15	"Frog Clock"	Unknown	26 September 2014	1 November 2014	TBA
When Mo accidentally breaks Zuzu's prized new frog clock, Owl suggests a visit to Magical Forest to find the Clock Pixie, said to be able to fix any clock.
68	16	"Planet Kite"	Unknown	8 January 2015	2 November 2014	TBA
The friends go on a trip to look for Egbert's kite, which has been stolen by the King of Kites. They must find a way to persuade him to give it back.
69	17	"Sunnyside Island"	Unknown	9 January 2015	3 November 2014	TBA
Owl is sad when his prized sunflower looks droopy, until Poppy suggests they take a journey in her sailing ship to Sunnyside Island to perk up the flower.
70	18	"Jungle Paint"	Unknown	10 January 2015	4 November 2014	TBA
When Zuzu accidentally spills some paint on Owl's favourite painting, the only way to fix it is to visit the artist who lives in the jungle.
71	19	"Misty Hollow"	Unknown	11 January 2015	5 November 2014	TBA
Alma's cousin Chester invites her to sing with him at a concert, but her voice mysteriously disappears due to nerves. A trip in an air balloon, however, helps her to regain her confidence.
72	20	"Petal Parade"	Unknown	12 January 2015	6 November 2014	TBA
When Poppy is chosen to be a Bright Blossom in the Petal Parade, her friends ask her to come along in the camper van to Blooming Brook to cheer on their friend.
73	21	"Laughing Squirrels"	Unknown	13 January 2015	7 November 2014	TBA
When Zuzu tells a few jokes, the friends are overcome with laughter until Owl tells them of the squirrels of The Silent Forest, who have never laughed.
74	22	"Cloud Chicks"	Unknown	23 January 2015	8 November 2014	TBA
The gang pile into the hot air balloon to return a lost Bumblebird chick to his mother up in the clouds, together with some mysterious flags that have fallen to earth.
75	23	"Puppet Mountain"	Unknown	14 January 2015	9 November 2014	TBA
Alma is upset when she loses one of her hand puppets for a show that she has carefully planned, so Poppy takes her to Puppet Mountain by horse and carriage to ask the Puppet Master to make her a new one.
76	24	"Fireworks Volcano"	Unknown	25 January 2015	10 November 2014	TBA
The gang set sail to see the Fireworks Volcano in the Sparkling Seaweed Sea, with no one in charge of the ship.
77	25	"Choppy Hedges"	Unknown	1 January 2015	11 November 2014	TBA
When Alma tells Owl about a job at Choppy Hedges to become Head Topiarist, Owl demonstrates his flair for topiary by using his beak.
78	26	"Snowy Slopes"	TBD	September 2014	TBA	TBA
Mo wants to break a world record in building with blocks, and Zuzu wants to break one in sliding, so the friends set off for Snowy Slopes. En route, they meet Barnabas P Penguin, who likes sliding too, and 'Sub-Zero Stanley, Ice Cube Salesman' (Egbert), who has lost his sleigh dogs.
79	27	"Lonely Sloth"	Unknown	14 May 2015	TBA	TBA
It is Owl's birthday and he is just about to read out a poem he has written for the occasion, when Zuzu finds a message in a bottle from a lonely sloth. Malcolm lives in the Slow-Moving Jungle and it turns out that it is his birthday too.
80	28	"Wolf Scout"	Unknown	4 August 2015	TBA	TBA
Zuzu's wolf friend Timothy needs to learn to howl for his Scout badge, so the gang rocket off to the moon, where they end up on trial for being there without permission.
81	29	"Spring Wings"	TBD	September 2014	30 January 2016	TBA
Gilda's nest has gone missing in Spinner's Grove. Owl broke his wing and can't fly, but he finds a clever way to lift Zuzu into the tree tops to help look for it.
82	30	"Orange Moon"	Unknown	15 May 2015	TBA	TBA
The gang set off to rescue Rocket-Cat, who is trapped in a cave on a planet made of oranges that tumble at the slightest sound. In the tunnels beneath Orange Moon, the boisterous Egbert causes a rockfall and the soft-spoken Mo becomes the hero of the hour.
83	31	"Star Trail"	Unknown	6 August 2015	TBA	TBA
When Rocket-Cat's fan club sends the friends a package containing a 'star ticket' and some strange spectacles, they go on an adventure into outer space to meet their hero. However, they are diverted by lost traveller who needs to get home, and Egbert disguised as Rocket-Badger steers them into a meteor shower and gets them lost.
84	32	"Stick Palace"	Unknown	17 May 2015	TBA	TBA
The gang are building Mo a stick palace, but when the wind blows it over Poppy suggests that they rebuild it in outer space, where it is calm. However, two Space Mice want the palace too, and while the gang are saving Egbert - disguised as Starburst, the Irregular Comet - from a meteor shower, the palace goes missing.
85	33	"Singing Dog"	Unknown	8 August 2015	TBA	TBA
After Owl teaches him to sing, Zuzu wants to track down a distant, beautiful song that only he can hear. The gang set off in a hot-air balloon to find out where it is coming from.
86	34	"Snowflake Lake"	TBD	September 2014	22 December 2015	TBA
When Alma finds a snow globe containing a dancing skater, Owl tells her the skater is dancing the Snowflake Suite on the frozen Snowflake Lake in Eternal Winterland.
87	35	"Shell Search"	Unknown	9 August 2015	TBA	TBA
When Zuzu breaks his conch shell, the friends set off on a submarine adventure to find him a new one in the Deep Blue Ocean.
88	36	"Craggy Peak"	Unknown	3 June 2015	10 August 2015	TBA
The friends set off in the train for Craggy Peak, so that Zuzu can learn mountain climbing. En route they meet Maudie, an elderly mountain goat who helps them trick Musical Mike, the obstructive Singing Train Controller (Egbert), and who proves surprisingly nimble and not at all frail and deaf as they had supposed.
89	37	"Coral Reef"	Unknown	4 June 2015	11 August 2015	TBA
Alma wants to make an exciting movie with her new underwater camera, so Poppy and the gang take the plane to the Great Coral Reef near Seahorse Island, where they meet a sea turtle named Belinda.
90	38	"Parrot Talk"	Unknown	5 June 2015	12 August 2015	TBA
After Zuzu finds a baby parrot in a bush, the gang head to Parrot Tropics to return him home. Everyone but Zuzu thinks it hilarious that little 'Zuza' imitates his every word, as if Zuzu were his elder brother. When Zuzu gets stuck in mud in the jungle, he is very glad that Zuza is there to add his cries for help to his own.
91	39	"Iceberg Hotel"	Unknown	11 June 2015	13 August 2015	TBA
When Mo finds a room key to the Iceberg Hotel, the friends fly to the Great Northern Iceberg to return it. They arrive, to find the place deserted except for Charlie Chapped-Beak, Penguin Waiter (Egbert) and Mikey, a polar bear cub who has become separated from his dad.
92	40	"Flute Lesson"	Unknown	6 June 2015	13 August 2015	TBA
Everyone is surprised when Poppy reveals that she is an expert flautist. Accompanied by Alma, Mo and Zuzu, she takes a trip in the balloon to Musical Marsh, where the reeds grow into flutes, but they are distracted on the way, and by the time they arrive everyone is too tired to take any lessons.
93	41	"Brown Bear"	Unknown	7 June 2015	14 August 2015	TBA
Brown Bear gives Poppy a present of a toy teddy bear. When she sees that it has a frown on his face, Poppy realises that her friend must be sad and takes the gang out in the campervan to find Brown Bear and cheer him up. Poppy has time to tell a tall story before her friend lies down to sleep for the winter.
94	42	"Tiny Giant"	Unknown	8 June 2015	15 August 2015	TBA
Mo discovers what it is like to be taller when he gets a new pair of stilts. Poppy takes the gang to the Land of Unusual Sizes, where they meet a tiny gorilla called Davy and a giant squirrel called Bob, but run into a spot of bother in the shape of Egbert, disguised as the Stomping Giant.
95	43	"Fairy House"	Unknown	9 June 2015	16 August 2015	TBA
Alma surprises her friends when she reveals that she believes in fairies and has made a small house for them. The friends head into the Enchanted Woods, where Alma hopes to meet a real fairy.
96	44	"Laundry Lagoon"	Unknown	10 June 2015	13 August 2015	TBA
After Owl loses a sock, the gang set off for Laundry Lagoon, where all missing laundry turns up. Zuzu is not very enthusiastic, but when he is put in charge of bringing organisation to the chaos that they encounter, he realises that a bit of hard work can be fun after all.
97	45	"Giggle Pond"	Unknown	12 June 2015	13 August 2015	TBA
After Alma scrapes her arm, Poppy puts a plaster on it and everyone sets off to Giggle Pond to visit Owl's friend, Dr. Billy and put a bandage on her arm. Alma thinks that it will hurt when the plaster is removed, but Dr. Billy persuades her to go for a swim in the Giggle Pond with the others. Soon she is giggling so much that she doesn't even notice when Dr. Billy removes the plaster and puts a bandage on her.
98	46	"Bright Comet"	Unknown	13 June 2015	13 August 2015	TBA
After Owl and Alma simultaneously spot a new comet in the night sky, the friends set off in the rocket for Library Planet. Byron the Librarian, an officious ostrich, is in charge of recording all new comets, which are named after the discoverer, but Owl doesn't want to share the credit with Alma.
99	47	"Halloween Woods"	Unknown	31 October 2015	31 October 2014	TBA
Poppy and friends are carving pumpkin lanterns when Owl reveals that Halloween is his favorite holiday and invites them to Halloween Woods in costume by train (with Poppy dressed as a cowgirl, Alma dressed as a fairy, Zuzu dressed as a pirate, Owl dressed as a wizard and Mo dressed as a skeleton) where they meet a bat named Basil.
100	48	"Squid Ink"	Unknown	14 June 2015	TBA	TBA
Zuzu needs waterproof ink to make a sign for Alma's flowerbed, so the friends take the submarine to look for the legendary Great Squid of Mystery, who lives in the Secret Sea.
101	49	"Purple Sands"	Unknown	15 June 2015	TBA	TBA
Ravi the Tiger invites the friends to enter a sand sculpture contest on the beach at Purple Sands. Zuzu and Alma both want to win, but there is strong competition from Parsa, a small sea turtle. When Ravi asks Poppy and Mo to help with the judging, Mo is reluctant to choose between his friends.
102	50	"Noodle Land"	TBD	September 2014	13 August 2015	TBA
While the friends are enjoying Poppy's homemade noodles, Zuzu tells them that his wooden racing car didn't win in the Scout's racing derby. Poppy suggests that he should test it first, like she did with the noodles, and takes them all off to Noodle Land, where there's a miniature track made out of noodles.
103	51	"Sky Monkey"	Unknown	17 June 2015	TBA	TBA
When Alma's ball vanishes in mid-air, Zuzu thinks that a girl monkey thief who lives in the sky is responsible. The friends jump in the plane and follow a trail of banana skins left on clouds to a treehouse on a mountain top, where they find Zizzle, aka Sky Monkey, and learn why she takes things.
104	52	"Happy Station"	Unknown	9 July 2015	TBA	TBA
The friends learn that a prize is to be awarded to the Most Helpful Group of Friends by a new station on the Cherry Tree Line. On the train to Happy Station, everyone brings along something that might be helpful to others, but after meeting Gilda, Velma the rabbit princess and Rex the elderly turtle, by the time they arrive they've given them all away.

== Production ==
Poppy Cat was announced on 2 April 2004, when Zenith Entertainment and distribution company Cake Entertainment had partnered to produce an animated series based on the Poppy Cat books by Lara Jones with producer Andrew Banner adapting & developing the series whilst the upcoming animated series Poppy Cat would be made at Zenith Entertainment's London production office, Cake Entertainment would handle distribution rights to the upcoming series.

Two years later in September 2006, independent international media & intellectual property group Coolabi had brought Zenith Entertainment's children production division including the upcoming television series Poppy Cat as Coolabi had assumed production for the upcoming series.

== Broadcast ==
Poppy Cat has aired in many territories, including Sprout and NBC Kids in the United States as a US-dubbed series, Disney Junior in Latin America and Spain (as La gatita Poppy and La Gata Lupe), KiKA in Germany (as Poppy Katz), Poland on MiniMini+ (as Kotka Pusia), RTP2 in Portugal, Hop! Channel in Israel, Baraem, Children's Channel and e-vision in U.A.E, Minimax in Central and Eastern Europe, France 5 in France and Nick Jr. in the United Kingdom. Poppy Cat first launched on KiKA in Germany in May 2015, with the second series released in April 2017.

Poppy Cat aired by accident on NBC affiliate WSMV-TV in Nashville on 26 October 2014, instead of the Manchester United-Chelsea Premier League match, sparking complaints on Twitter. WSMV-TV rejoined the game in the process.
