= Mama Mirabelle's Home Movies =

2007 animated children's television series

- Genre: Animated series Educational
- Based on: an idea by George Evelyn and Wild Brain; character designs by Eric Brace
- Developed by: Douglas Wood; Andy Yerkes
- Directed by: Leo Nielsen
- Starring: Floella Benjamin; Vanessa Williams; Phillipa Alexander; Jules de Jongh; Teresa Gallagher
- Opening theme: "Mama Mirabelle's Home Movies" by Floella Benjamin/Vanessa Williams "Movie Time!" by Floella Benjamin
- Composer: Lester Barnes
- Countries of origin: United Kingdom; United States
- Original language: English
- No. of seasons: 1
- No. of episodes: 52

Production
- Producer: Leo Nielsen
- Running time: 10 minutes
- Production company: King Rollo Films; National Geographic Kids Entertainment

Original release
- Network: CBeebies (UK); PBS Kids (US)
- Release: March 19, 2007 – January 18, 2008

Mama Mirabelle's Home Movies is an animated educational wildlife children's television series produced as a co-production between National Geographic Kids Entertainment, CBeebies and King Rollo Films, and distributed worldwide by National Geographic Television International. The series was based on the National Geographic-published book When Mama Mirabelle Comes Home written by Douglas Wood, and uses archived content from the BBC Natural History Unit and the National Geographic Society.

The series originally aired on CBeebies in the UK, with a total of 52 episodes produced. In the United States, the series aired on PBS and packaged into 26 half-hours.

In the American version, all of the main animals except Karla have American voices. Vanessa Williams is the voice of Mama Mirabelle in the US, and Floella Benjamin is the voice for Mama Mirabelle in the UK.

== Premise ==
Set in the African savannah, it focuses on an enthusiastic elephant named Mama Mirabelle, who travels around the world to film real wildlife footage and project them onto a screen of fireflies in front of almost the entire animal kingdom. The "Home Movies" are used for educational purposes not only for the main young characters but for the pre-school audience at home.

== Characters ==
- Mama Mirabelle (voiced by Floella Benjamin in the United Kingdom and Vanessa Williams in the United States) is the show's title character; an enthusiastic and intelligent elephant who always wears a beautiful orange hat with blue flowers on it. She has travelled the world and made movies of all of the many animals around her.
- Max (voiced by Phillipa Alexander in both the United Kingdom and the United States, and Josephine Schmidt in Germany) is Mama Mirabelle's energetic son, who is the youngest of the group. He always says "Whoa" when he sees something intriguing.
- Karla (voiced by Teresa Gallagher in both the United Kingdom and the United States, and Jennifer Wieb in Germany) is a gentle zebra foal who is always full of questions. She looks up to Mama Mirabelle and wants to be like her when she grows up.
- Bo (voiced by Teresa Gallagher in the United Kingdom, Jules de Jongh in the United States, and Jesco Spirgen in Germany) is a spunky cheetah cub. He is very adventurous, feisty and high-strung and loves to run fast.
- Chip, Flip and Kip are three mischievous vervet monkeys. They host the Monkey Minutes interstitials. Unlike the other main characters, they do not speak, except in monkey noises.
- Merlin is an Egyptian fruit bat.
- Kayla (voiced by Moya O'Sullivan) is a red kangaroo who is friends with Mama Mirabelle.
- Kylie (voiced by Gabriella Lewis) is Kayla's daughter. She only has one line in each episode she appeared in.
- Daddy Stripes (voiced by David Holt in the United Kingdom and the United States) is Karla's father who appears in one episode.
- Keisha (voiced by Emma Tate) is a wombat whom Karla befriends. She is only seen in To Sleep With Wombats.
- Benny (voiced by Lizzie Waterworth) is a lovebird who loves to aid.
- Winnie is a wildebeest calf who is Karla's friend. She and her migrating herd only appear in Here Today, Gone Tomorrow. She can speak Swahili.
- Jacques (voiced by Alan Marriott) is a walrus who is a fellow traveller of Mama Mirabelle.
- Mama Bird (voiced by Elly Fairman) is Benny's mother.
- Edna (voiced by Felicia Hamilton) is a young echidna who lives in Australia.

== Crew ==
- Susan Blu – Voice Director
- Kent Meredith – Voice Director

== Episodes ==
1. Elephant Walk
2. The Sounds of the Savanna
3. A Little Help from My Friends
4. Baby of a Different Stripe
5. Hide and Go Seek
6. Tell Me About It
7. To Sleep with Wombats
8. All Creatures Great and Small
9. Anybody Home?
10. Healthy Habits
11. Play's the Thing
12. Sam Spades of the Savanna
13. Gourmet Grazing
14. Kings and Queens of the Savanna
15. I Spy
16. Eyes, Ears, Noses, and Trunks
17. The Boy Can Blow
18. I Don't Like Spiders and Snakes
19. What's in a Tail
20. Footprints in the Sand
21. Here Today, Gone Tomorrow
22. Nobody's Perfect
23. Things That Go Yip, Howl and Screech in the Night
24. Cracking the Code
25. A Savanna Kwanzaa
26. You Must Have Been a Beautiful Baby
27. Change is Gonna Come
28. Trumpet While You Work
29. Spot the Difference
30. Hot-and-Cold Running Critters
31. Why Zebras Can't Fly
32. Super Duper Savanna Animals
33. Come Out of Your Shell
34. Travels with Mama
35. Tails of the Galápagos
36. Happy Habitats
37. Savanna Lullaby
38. It Gives You Paws
39. Out of Reach
40. Family Style
41. Curtain Up!
42. Listen Up!
43. Rainy Day Blues
44. Take Me to the Water
45. Find Your Way Home
46. The Nose Knows
47. Jumbled Jungle
48. Alone Together
49. Muddy Wonderland
50. Do You See What I See?
51. Have You Heard?
52. This is Mama's World

== Merchandise ==
On 7 October 2008, National Geographic appointed Copyright Promotions Licensing Group as the show's licensor in the United Kingdom, France and Benelux territories.
