= Spot (franchise) =

Children's book series

- Front cover of Spot's First Walk
- Author: Eric Hill
- Illustrator: Eric Hill
- Country: United Kingdom
- Language: English

Spot is a children's book series by English author and illustrator Eric Hill. The success of Hill's books about Spot led to other media productions, including television and home video titles, music albums, and CD-ROM titles.

== History ==
First published in 1980, Where's Spot? was inspired while Hill was working in creative marketing; he noticed that his three-year-old son was fascinated by the process of lifting up a paper, on a design that he was creating. Captivated by this thought, Hill created a story about a puppy which incorporated the flap design. During the late 1970s, this was an extraordinarily innovative concept, and it took some time for any publisher to take any notice of the idea before Puffin books decided to publish his book. Within weeks of the first book being released it topped the Bestseller list.

Hill said that, "When I first drew Spot I realised that when I came to draw the spot on his body and the tip of his tail I was copying the markings on an aircraft. I grew up drawing aircraft – that is how I learned to draw. "I am quite convinced now, as I look back, that the actual training of drawing cartoons – which is, of course, my style – led to my producing Spot. Cartoons must be very simple and have as few words as possible and so must the Spot books. I designed Spot out of my previous background as a designer and illustrator. It was quite unconscious but I can see now that I have created a ready-made trademark of its kind, with the essential spot on the body and a bit on the tail."

Over time, the book was translated into more than sixty languages.

== Characters ==
=== Major characters ===
- Spot – The protagonist of the series. A yellow puppy with a brown spot on each side of his body and a brown tip on his tail. Spot's breed is never directly mentioned in the books, but bears some similarities to a beagle or a Golden Retriever; his parents share this resemblance. Spot is full of curiosity, helpfulness, and a huge desire to learn.
- Sally – Spot's mother. She is also yellow and has a brown spot on her back that goes around the back of her body, as well as two brown spots on each side of her body and a brown tip on her tail. Much of the first story, Where's Spot?, involves her wandering around the house looking for Spot.
- Sam – Spot's father. He is also yellow, but without any spots on his body.
- Susie – Spot's little sister, she is yellow but has a brown spot on her back. Like her big brother Spot, Susie also appears to be a mixed breed.
- Helen – A blue hippopotamus who is Spot's best friend. She is dark blue and she has sags under her eyes in the first series of The Adventures of Spot. In later episodes of the first series, she is redesigned with a more youthful and less intimidating appearance, and is light blue without the sags under her eyes. Starting with the second series, she becomes a more lighter shade of blue.
- Steve – A brown monkey (possibly a chimpanzee or spider monkey) with a tan face, who is playful, full of surprises and Spot's second best friend.
- Tom – A green crocodile who is Spot's third best friend. In the first series of The Adventures of Spot, he was dark green with white eye sacs, rather sharp-looking incisors and the inside of his mouth was red. Starting with later episodes of the first series, similar to Helen, he was also redesigned with a more youthful and less intimidating appearance, losing the sharp incisors and white eye sacs. In the second series, he is a lighter shade of green. He loves going fishing. Tom also loves playing with the drums, considered to be his favourite instrument. His dad is the mayor of the town.
- Ginger – A ginger cat who appears in the books as the family pet.

=== Minor characters ===
- Grandma – Spot's maternal grandmother and Sally's mother. She appears in the book Spot Visits His Grandparents and the video Spot and his Grandparents Go to the Carnival.
- Grandpa – Spot's maternal grandfather and Sally's father. He appears in the book Spot Visits His Grandparents and the video Spot and his Grandparents Go to the Carnival.
- Miss Bear – A brown bear who is Spot's preschool teacher. She first appeared in Spot Goes to School.

=== Recurring characters ===
- Billy – A brown bear who loves to eat.
- Betsy – A brown bear who only appears in Spot Goes to the Circus. She is one of the characters who takes Spot's ball, and insists its hers when Spot asks for it.
- Clare – A green turtle who is one of Spot's classmates and appears in Spot Goes to School. She is the only other girl in Spot's nursery/preschool class besides Helen.
- Sidney – A yellow-green snake.
- Percy and Polly – Two penguins who attend Spot's birthday in Spot's Birthday Party.
- Sybil – An orange cat who is the series' antagonist. She has a very rude personality, as seen in the episodes Spot's Lost Bone and Spot's First Walk as well as the book based on the latter episode. She appears only in the first series of The Adventures of Spot. In the U.S., her rude personality was toned down.
- Mr. Kangaroo – Spot's neighbour, a brown kangaroo who speaks in an Australian accent, since kangaroos are only found in Australia. He appears only in the first series of The Adventures of Spot.
- Leo – An orange lion.
- Steve's Mom – Steve's mother. She appears only in Spot Sleeps Over. She is voiced by Linda Gary.
- The Mayor – Tom's dad. He appears only in Spot Goes to the Carnival and the book from the book series Spot Goes to School. He does not speak.

== Books ==
Since 1980, with the success of Where's Spot?, the late Eric Hill went on to write and illustrate numerous other books, with most being translated into Welsh (as well as the TV series, commissioned by S4C), some have also been translated into Scottish Gaelic, and Where's Spot? has been translated into Cornish.

- Where's Spot? (1980)
- Spot's First Walk (1981)
- Spot's Birthday Party (1982)
- Spot Goes to School (1984)
- Spot Goes on Holiday (1985)
- Spot Goes to the Farm (1987)
- Spot's First Easter (1988)
- Spot's Baby Sister (1989)
- Spot's Goes to a Party (1992)
- Spot Visits his Grandparents (1996)

=== List of Spot sound books ===
In the 1990s, a number of books were released with sound effects, produced by Publications International and published by Frederick Warne. The U.S. edition of the sound books were somewhat different from the UK editions of the book. The text in these editions is slightly altered, and in some cases, the title is changed as well. They are produced and published by Publications International.

=== Book design ===
The books are set in the typeface Century Schoolbook Infant, a very rare, single-story version of Century Schoolbook.

== Television ==
With the success of the books, the BBC commissioned an animated series, which first appeared on 9 April 1987; with Paul Nicholas providing the narration, and re-narrated in 2000 by Jane Horrocks. The series aired on television networks across the world, including RTÉ in Ireland, with the series dubbed into Irish Gaelic with the title Echtrai Bhrain. A DVD version was released in Japan in 2005 with Japanese, English and instrumental audio tracks. The DVDs used the same name for Spot as the books in Japan, that being コロちゃん (Korochan). The series aired on Playhouse Disney and CBeebies.

In February 2024, it was announced a new animated series is currently in production from Guru Studio, which marks a revival.

=== The Adventures of Spot: series 1 (1987) ===
The first series of The Adventures of Spot, which was animated and produced by King Rollo Films, aired on the BBC between 9 April and 17 July 1987. It consisted of 13 episodes, each 5 minutes long. The episodes were narrated by Paul Nicholas (original version) and the music was composed by Duncan Lamont (original version).

Episodes in this series:

1. "Spot's Surprise Parcel" (9 April 1987)
2. "Spot's Lost Bone" (16 April 1987)
3. "Spot's First Walk" (23 April 1987)
4. "Spot in the Woods" (30 April 1987)
5. "Spot's Birthday Party" (7 May 1987)
6. "Where's Spot?" (14 May 1987)
7. "Sweet Dreams, Spot" (21 May 1987)
8. "Spot Goes to School" (28 May 1987)
9. "Spot Goes to the Circus" (4 June 1987)
10. "Spot Follows His Nose" (11 June 1987)
11. "Spot Goes Splash" (18 June 1987)
12. "Spot's Windy Day" (16 July 1987)
13. "Spot Goes to the Beach" (17 July 1987)

=== The Adventures of Spot: series 2 (1993) ===
The second series of The Adventures of Spot aired between 6 September and 20 December 1993, and, like the first series, consisted of 13 5-minute episodes. Once again, the episodes were produced by King Rollo Films. Paul Nicholas (original version) returned as the voices and Duncan Lamont (original version) returned as composer of the music.

Episodes in this series:

1. "Spot Goes to the Farm" (6 September 1993)
2. "Spot Sleeps Over" (9 September 1993)
3. "Spot Makes a Cake" (13 September 1993)
4. "Spot Goes to the Park" (16 September 1993)
5. "Spot Finds a Key" (20 September 1993)
6. "Spot in the Garden" (23 September 1993)
7. "Spot Goes to a Party" (27 September 1993)
8. "Spot's Winter Sports" (15 November 1993)
9. "Spot Goes to the Fair" (22 November 1993)
10. "Spot's Favorite Toy" (29 November 1993)
11. "Spot's First Picnic" (6 December 1993)
12. "Spot at the Playground" (13 December 1993)
13. "Storytime with Spot" (20 December 1993)

=== Spot's Musical Adventures (2000) ===
Spot's Musical Adventures, similar to The Adventures of Spot, aired between 25 October and 10 November 2000. Like The Adventures of Spot, this series consisted of thirteen episodes, but this time, with a short song in them. The format of the series reverted to the narration format used prior to the specials. For these episodes, however, comedian Jane Horrocks was given the role of the narrator and voices, instead of Paul Nicholas. The episodes and the songs were all written by Andrew Brenner, and the songs were performed by American London-based actor Dan Russell. The music was also composed by Kick Production.

Episodes:

1. "Spot's Show" (25 October 2000)
2. "Spot's Treehouse" (26 October 2000)
3. "Spot's Breakfast" (27 October 2000)
4. "Spot's Horse" (released in the U.S. as "Spot's Hobby Horse") (30 October 2000)
5. "Spot's Grandpa" (31 October 2000)
6. "Spot's Umbrella" (1 November 2000)
7. "Spot's Band" (2 November 2000)
8. "Spot's Bath" (3 November 2000)
9. "Spot's Tent" (6 November 2000)
10. "Spot Tidies Up" (released in the U.S. as "Spot Cleans Up") (7 November 2000)
11. "Spot Helps Grandma" (8 November 2000)
12. "Spot's School Trip" (9 November 2000)
13. "Hide and Seek" (released in the U.S. as "Spot Plays Hide and Seek") (10 November 2000)

=== New adaptation ===
In March 2024, it was announced that Canadian animation studio Guru Studio had optioned the television rights and was reportedly working on a new television adaptation. In October 2026, it was announced that the series will be titled Where’s Spot and that the series will be co-production between Guru Studio and the UK-based company Karrot Entertainment.

== Direct-to-video specials ==
A number of specials produced for release on VHS were created:

=== It's Fun to Learn with Spot – Phase 1 (1990) ===
The first phase of It's Fun to Learn With Spot was produced by Spitfire Television and Living Doll Productions and released on VHS. It consisted of four episodes, each approximately fifteen minutes in length, and narrated by Peter Hawkins and produced by Living Doll Productions (who later produced The Beano Video). The theme song used in The Adventures of Spot was licensed from King Rollo Films, so the familiar tune by Duncan Lamont was heard at the beginning and end of each episode. However, music on the show was kept to a minimum, with the exception of "Spot's Alphabet", which ends with a rendition of "The ABC Song".

1. "Spot's Alphabet"
2. "Spot's Busy Year"
3. "Spot Learns to Count"
4. "Spot Tells the Time"

=== It's Fun to Learn with Spot – Phase 2 (1994) ===
The second phase of It's Fun to Learn With Spot, like the first VHS, consisted of four fifteen-minute episodes. However the episodes were produced by King Rollo Films and retained the talents of Paul Nicholas and Duncan Lamont in the UK.

Episodes in this series:

1. "Spot Looks at Opposites"
2. "Spot's First Word Game"
3. "Spot Looks at Colours"
4. "Spot Looks at Shapes"

Note: The two phases of It's Fun to Learn with Spot are often listed as one series, even on Penguin Television's website. However, as noted, the two phases were produced four years apart by two different companies and are very different in design.

=== Standalone Specials ===
Spot's Magical Christmas was released in 1995 and Spot and his Grandparents Go to the Carnival in 1997. These two specials, which are both thirty minutes long, have some notable differences from the normal series. First off, they have no narration, and each character is voiced distinctly. The characters' mouths also move to speech, in comparison to the other episodes, in which the characters' mouths remain static and the entire episode is narrated as a story. There are also several songs in the specials, as there were in It's Fun to Learn With Spot.

Voices

- Calum Neilsen – Spot (Spot's Magical Christmas)
- Tom Fletcher – Spot (Spot and his Grandparents Go to the Carnival)
- Josie Lawrence – Sally/Helen
- Paul Nicholas – Sam (Spot's Magical Christmas)
- Philip Pope – Tom
- Steve Steen – Sam (Spot and his Grandparents Go to the Carnival)/Steve
- Steve Frost – Reindeer #1
- Lee Cornes – Reindeer #2
- Andy Paresi – Santa Claus
- Carol MacReady – Grandma
- Rob Inglis – Grandpa

=== American cast ===
From 1989 to 2002, The Disney Channel aired the two The Adventures of Spot series as part of its half-hour Lunch Box series, and later as post-show interstitials. For the program's home video releases in the United States, Walt Disney Home Video re-dubbed the series with character voices rather than a singular narrator. The Disney Channel also aired the two re-dubbed specials but continued to air The Adventures of Spot in its original British version.

- Corey Burton – Narrator, Sam, Tom, Steve, Spot's Grandpa, additional voices
- Linda Gary (until 1995) – Sally, Miss Bear, Betsy, Helen, Clare, Tina, Sybil, additional voices
- Jonathan Taylor Thomas, Ryan O'Donohue and Haley Joel Osment – Spot
- Shaun Fleming – Spot (singing voice)
- Tress MacNeille (since 1995) – Helen, Sally, Female Reindeer, Spot's Grandma, additional voices
- Jim Cummings – Male Reindeer, Santa Claus

== Other media ==
=== Music albums ===
A number of companies have released a number of CDs featuring mainly nursery rhymes, under the name of "The Spot".

- Spot in the Park with the Flowerpot Gang – Released in Australia by the Australian Broadcasting Corporation in the early 2000s, this CD consists of 26 nursery rhymes. Apparently, it is now out of print.
- Spot's First Play Songs – Published by Genius Entertainment, this CD is also available in a box set titled Spot's Favorite Toddler Tunes (although in this edition, The Alphabet Song is excluded).
- Spot's Farmyard Friends – This CD has also been published by Genius Entertainment and is also available in the Spot's Favorite Toddler Tunes box set.
- Spot's Classics for Growing Minds – Jumping on the success of the controversial Mozart Effect, this CD contains twelve classical numbers from various classical composers. Also published by Genius Entertainment, this album was also included in the Spot's Favorite Toddler Tunes box set.

=== CD-ROMs ===
Two Spot CD-ROM titles were published by Europress and Hasbro Interactive in 2000. Both titles run on both Microsoft Windows (Windows 95 or NT4 up to Windows ME) and Apple Macintosh (OS 8 up to Mac OS X Leopard) computers. These games were titled Spot and his Friends and Spot's Busy Day, respectively.
