= Mr Benn =

Character in children's books and animation

Gladiator, the final book in the original Mr Benn series

Mr Benn is a character, created by David McKee, who originally appeared in several children's books. The first, Mr Benn Red Knight, was published in 1967, followed by three more; these became the basis for an animated television series of the same name originally transmitted by the BBC from 1971 to 1972.

In both the books and the television series, Mr Benn's adventures take on a similar pattern. Mr Benn, a man wearing a dark suit and bowler hat, leaves his house at 52 Festive Road, London, and visits a fancy-dress costume shop where he is invited by the moustachioed, fez-wearing shopkeeper to try on a particular outfit. He leaves the shop through a magic door at the back of the changing room and enters a world appropriate to his costume, where he has an adventure (which usually contains a moral) before the shopkeeper reappears to lead him back to the changing room, and the story comes to an end.

At the end of each story, Mr Benn returns to his normal life, but is left with a small souvenir of his magical adventure. Additionally, scenes before and after his adventure usually have some connection to it, such as the games the children are playing in the street as he passes.

== Books ==
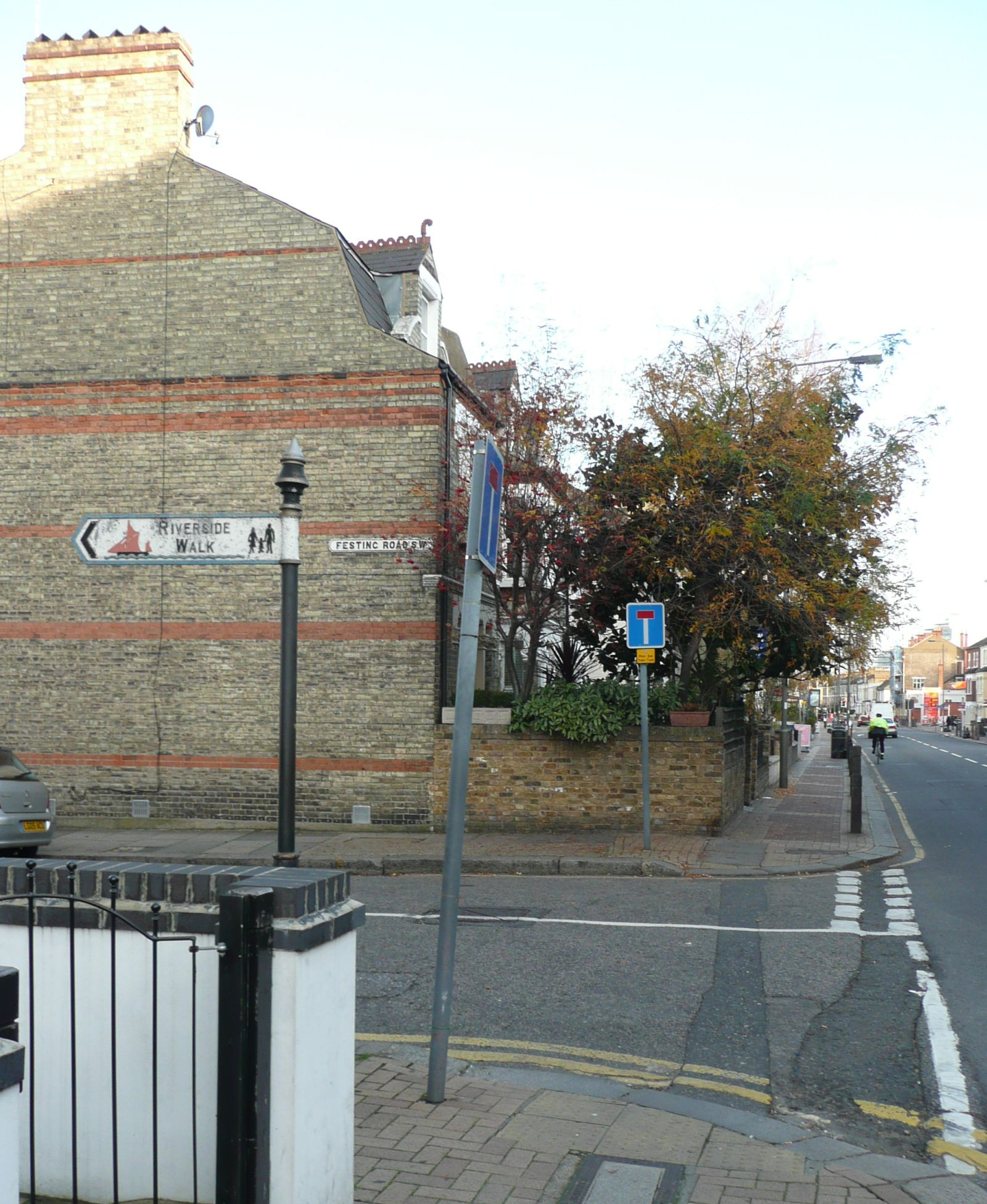
Festing Road, Putney

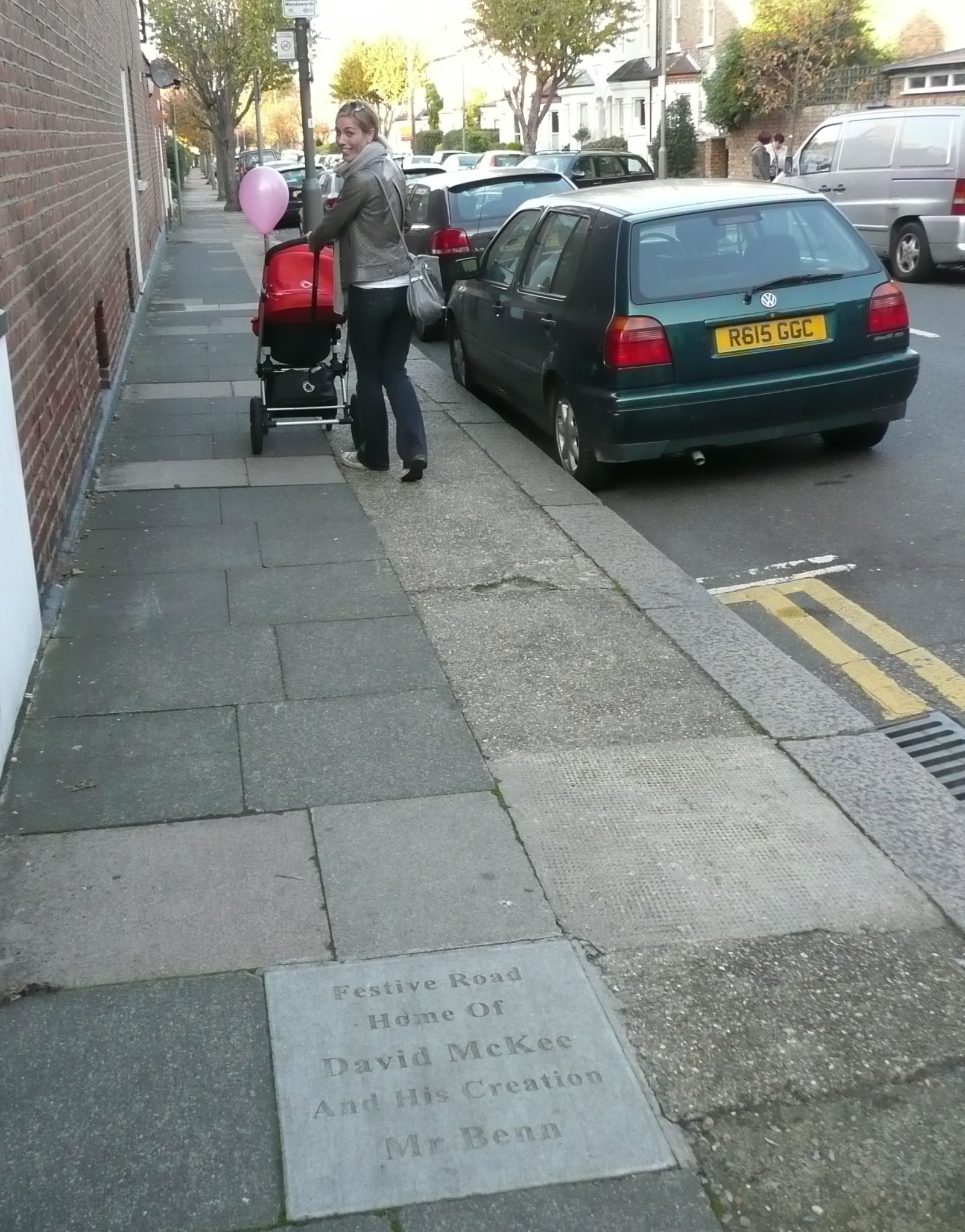
Paving slab on Festing Road inscribed "Festive Road; Home of David McKee and his creation Mr Benn"

David McKee got the inspiration for Mr Benn from Festing Road in Putney where he used to live. McKee had the house "next door" at 54 Festing Road, where residents installed an engraved paving slab in his honour on 26 November 2009. McKee later said that "in the first book, I drew myself looking out of the window, and I thought it would be quite nice to have him next door". The image in the books was based on a picture taken by photographer Micaela Mitchell called The Business Man. McKee said he had always thought of Mr Benn as having the first name William.

Mr Benn's adventures are available to buy in book-form: four were published originally, and further books in the 1990s were based on the television series. The original four books were: Mr Benn – Red Knight, Big Game Benn, 123456789 Benn, and Big Top Benn. There were six original books planned, but the fifth and sixth were never published. The fifth was called Mr Benn Rides Again, the story of which was used to make the television episode The Cowboy. The sixth, never completed, was Superbenn, in which the superhero Mr Benn sets out on an environmental adventure.

There is one book for which no corresponding television episode has (yet) been made. 123456789 Benn was published in 1970 (ISBN 0-234-77361-8) and tells the story of Mr Benn as a convict (hence the number) inspiring his jail-mates to brighten up their cells. This was after the BBC, who screened the television series, felt that the story was too mature for a children's series.

A new story was published in 2001, the first Mr Benn story that McKee had written in thirty years, and is called Mr Benn – Gladiator (ISBN 1-84270-024-3). McKee indicated that he might write more Mr Benn stories, but none were published before his death in 2022.

In 2001 Mr Benn's Little Book of Life was published by Tess Read, which explores the lessons of Mr Benn's adventures.

The only character who appears several times, apart from Mr Benn and the shopkeeper, is Smasher Lagru. Smasher first appears as an inmate in 123456789 Benn, and then after his release in Big Top Benn and the new Mr Benn – Gladiator.

A Mr Benn Annual (ISBN 0-85096-029-0) was published by Polystyle Publications Ltd in 1972. It was written by Jan Falconer and illustrated by McKee. This contained a number of illustrated text stories, three strip-cartoon style adventures and a few puzzle pages. Mr Benn visits: China for a kite festival, a fairytale Arabia, Venice and Holland. He also becomes a barrow boy in a pearly suit and meets Mr Grubbly and his animal friends in the African jungle.

Tate Publishing republished all of the original books in 2010.

== Television ==
Mr Benn
- Genre: Family
- Created by: David McKee
- Written by: David McKee
- Directed by: Pat Kirby
- Narrated by: Ray Brooks
- Theme music composer: Duncan Lamont (under the pseudonym "Don Warren")
- Country of origin: United Kingdom
- Original language: English
- No. of episodes: 14

Production
- Producer: David McKee
- Running time: 15 minutes
- Production company: Zephyr Films

Original release
- Network: BBC1
- Release: 25 February 1971 – 31 March 1972
- Network: Nick Jr.
- Release: 1 January 2005

McKee wrote and animated (with Ian Lawless) thirteen Mr Benn episodes for the BBC between 1971 and 1972. These episodes were repeated twice a year for 21 years with further repeats airing in 1993, 1994, 1996, 1997, 1998 and 2000. The episodes were narrated by Ray Brooks. The music is credited as composed by Don Warren, which was a pseudonym for Duncan Lamont.

McKee did not benefit financially to the extent he might have: "I signed a contract where I only got a one-off payment and no repeat fees, but I've done quite well from a number of other things and I'm still exhibiting paintings." According to Mr Benn's Little Book of Life, very little of McKee's original artwork created for the television episodes exists today, as most of it was thrown into a rubbish skip in the 1970s.

After over thirty years, a brand new Mr Benn episode was screened for the first time on 1 January 2005, on Nick Jr. UK's evening block Noggin. The episode was based on McKee's 2001 book Mr Benn - Gladiator.

The series was voted the sixth most popular children's television programme in the 2001 Channel 4 poll 100 Greatest Kids' TV shows. It was also rated number 13 in the 50 Greatest Kids TV Shows which aired on Channel 5 on 8 November 2013.

=== Episode listing ===
The first six episodes of Mr Benn were broadcast Thursday afternoons on BBC1 at 1:30pm from 25 February to 1 April 1971. When the final seven episodes aired Friday afternoons on BBC1 at 1:30pm from 21 January to 31 March 1972 the first six were shown again but in a different order.

Four of the episodes were billed with alternate titles in Radio Times.

Original broadcast order	Second broadcast order	Title	Original broadcast date	Second broadcast date	Memento gained
1	1	"Red Knight"	25 February 1971	7 January 1972	Box of matches decorated with a picture of a dragon
In this very first episode, Mr Benn has been invited to a fancy-dress party. He dislikes parties, but enjoys dressing up, so he looks round the shops for a costume to wear, but everywhere he finds only ordinary everyday clothes. Turning into a small lane on his way home, Mr Benn comes across a costume shop where he chooses an outfit of red knight's armour. Changing into the armour, Mr Benn passes through another door in the shop's changing room and finds himself in another world. He stumbles upon a dragon, and at first thinks it is someone else in fancy dress. He soon realises his mistake. He learns that the dragon used to be the King's pet, until an evil match-maker started a fire and made sure the dragon got the blame. Mr Benn helps the dragon regain the King's favour. On returning to his own everyday world, Mr Benn decides he has had enough excitement and will not be going to the fancy-dress party after all. But he tells the shopkeeper that he will be coming back to the shop again soon to try another costume and have another adventure.
2	2	"Hunter" "The Hunter"	4 March 1971	14 January 1972	Photograph of a herd of elephants
Mr Benn is dressed as a hunter, in keeping with the pet shop and the garden centre he passed on his way to a shop. He does not behave like a hunter however. He is apprenticed to another hunter, who claims to be the greatest hunter in the world, and prevents him from killing any of the animals, by claiming they are not enough of a challenge for him. They finally stumble upon a herd of elephants. Mr Benn gets them to jump up and down, throwing the hunter off balance. He convinces the hunter to sell his rifle, buy a camera, and become a wildlife photographer instead.
3	10	"Clown"	11 March 1971	10 March 1972	Clown's red nose
On a normal day, Mr Benn who is a kind and gentle person, sees children juggling, bouncing balls and laughing. He strolls to the costume shop and sees a clown costume. Mr Benn dresses up in it and walks through the magic door. Shocked with the scenery, he finds himself in an isolated landscape but rides off in a clown car he finds. Driving in the car, Mr Benn laughs as it begins to act funny. In the distance, he sees circus folk stopped at a bridge; it had collapsed. The people were fussing over the broken bridge with individuals suggesting solutions - but none would work. Mr Benn suggests they work together and they agree. Spirits raised, they begin working on the bridge. When the bridge repair is accomplished, Mr Benn crosses first with the circus folk following. Relieved, the circus folk make their way to the town, pitch up their tent and (although exhausted) begin to perform. Eventually, out of thin air, a magician (who looks familiar) appears and makes objects disappear, concluding with Mr Benn who arrives back in the changing room. Mr Benn returns the costume, but the shopkeeper lets him keep the red nose. Despite enjoying the adventure, Mr Benn returns home for a rest.
4	5	"Balloonist" "Mr Benn Goes Ballooning"	18 March 1971	4 February 1972	Medal
Mr Benn is watching children playing with balloons and clouds drifting across the sky. As usual, he walks to the costume shop, where the magic door leads him to a crowd of people watching six colourful balloons ready to race. Most of them have extra means of propulsion (like propellers and oars) but two do not: one belonging to the villainous Baron Burtrum and the other to a man who asks Mr Benn to become his co-pilot. When the race begins it becomes apparent that Baron Burtrum has sabotaged all the other balloons, including Mr Benn's, which he has tied to a drain pipe. Mr Benn pulls it free and the two balloons drift across the sky. Mr Benn has an idea to let out some of the gas, diverting it horizontally with the drain pipe to provide a form of jet propulsion. This causes the balloon to sink but they nevertheless overtake Baron Burtrum. The Baron cheats again by having a man on a horse tow his balloon, but the animal becomes frightened and runs in the wrong direction. Mr Benn's balloon wins and he receives a medal.
5	8	"Wizard"	25 March 1971	25 February 1972	Jar that once held magic dust
Mr Benn is asked by a Queen to change her husband's appearance, feeling he is not kingly enough. However, the spells cast by Mr Benn do not turn out as expected, and Mr Benn eventually convinces the Queen that how the King looks is not important.
6	11	"Spaceman"	1 April 1971	17 March 1972	Lump of rock that was once gold
Mr Benn and his fellow astronaut visit several weird and wonderful planets.
7	3	"Cook"	21 January 1972	—	Wooden spoon
Little Princess Annabella refuses to eat. Mr Benn realises she is lonely, and helps her find her appetite by inviting all the city's poor, hungry children to the Palace for a feast.
8	4	"Caveman"	28 January 1972	—	Stone hammer
A stone-age community live right next to a dusty and dangerous road, frequented by dinosaurs and other prehistoric animals, but want to live in the fresh green countryside. There is just one problem: there are no caves. Mr Benn has the answer; they can build stone huts.
9	6	"Zoo Keeper"	11 February 1972	—	Parrot's feather
Mr Benn helps the animals in the zoo to improve their accommodation by making the townsfolk see that the cages are too small.
10	7	"Diver (Frogman)" "The Frogman"	18 February 1972	—	Seashell
Mr Benn helps King Neptune and his mermaid friend outwit the crews of two submarines, who are out to find and photograph the King's pet sea monster.
11	9	"Cowboy"	3 March 1972	—	Sheriff's badge
The Indians have always beaten the cowboys in a weekly game of hide-and-seek. When Mr Benn joins in as the cowboy to hide, he helps the cowboys to win for the first time by exposing the very clever hiding place of the hidden Indian.
12	12	"Aladdin (Magic Carpet)" "Mr Benn and the Magic Carpet"	24 March 1972	—	Stopper from the genie's bottle
Mr Benn helps a boy outwit an evil man, with the aid of the magic carpet that came with his costume and a little magic courtesy of a genie in a bottle.
13	13	"Pirate"	31 March 1972	—	Jolly Roger flag
Mr Benn sails with a skull and crossbones and helps the crew of a pirate ship, who are determined not to be pirates, turn their Captain into an honest man, and see that he gets a very different sort of treasure for his island: trees from a crew of gardeners whose ship the pirates pretend to capture, but actually rescue, during a storm.

The one-off special episode based on the final Mr Benn book called "Gladiator" was broadcast on Nick Jr. on New Year's Day in 2005.

Episode number	Title	Original broadcast date	Memento gained
14	"Gladiator"	1 January 2005	Smasher Lagru's whistle
Mr Benn is transported to Ancient Rome, where he meets his friend Smasher Lagru. But he has forgotten that prisoners are made to fight gladiators in the arena, and those who are not beaten will end up facing the lions.

== Other appearances ==
=== Film ===
In 1999, it was reported that a feature film was in development and that director Jevon O'Neill’s production company, Erinfilm, had purchased the film rights to Mr Benn from David McKee. The film was to star John Hannah as Mr Benn and Ben Kingsley as the Shopkeeper. However, the film was cancelled in 2001 and, as of 2017, the project remains dormant. In an interview with the BBC in May 2014, McKee stated that, on a film version: "I'd like to see that [the film] happen, because Mr Benn's a big boy and he can live his own life. I think he's right for being developed on the big screen".

In 2026, it was announced that Kirk Jones would direct a live action adaptation of Mr Benn, with filming expected to start in early 2027.

=== Theatrical adaptation ===
Mr Benn was adapted for the stage by Tall Stories Theatre Company. It was first performed at the 2011 Edinburgh Fringe and toured until 2013.

=== DVD release ===
Contender Home Entertainment released a DVD containing all fourteen episodes (including the then-new "Gladiator" episode) on 10 October 2005.

Demand DVD released the complete series in two separate volumes on 9 December 2013.

Coach House Productions re-released the complete series set on 8 February 2021 to celebrate the show's 50th anniversary. It also includes a bonus documentary.

In 2026, Fabulous Films acquired home media rights to the series and restored the series from the original film negatives in 4K HD. The restored version of the series will be released on 26 October 2026, on Blu-ray and 4K Blu-ray, making the show's debut on both formats.

=== Advertising ===
A 1993 advert for R. White's Lemonade had the Secret Lemonade Drinker character led back to the changing room by the Shop Keeper, where he is revealed to be Mr Benn on an adventure. As Mr Benn returns to Festive Avenue, children drink R. White's Lemonade. The advert was narrated by Ray Brooks.

In 2013 Mr Benn appeared in a Christmas advert for MrPorter.com, an online clothing retailer.

Mr Benn appeared on one of the twelve postage stamps issued by Royal Mail in January 2014 to celebrate classic children's programmes.

In January 2018, The Insurance Emporium launched its first national TV ad featuring Mr Benn. The Financial Times observed that the ad followed a trend in the UK at the time of using nostalgic cartoon characters in adverts such as Lloyds Bank subsidiary, Halifax. The first advert featured Mr Benn and a new supporting character, Eddie the dog. It was the first time new content of Mr Benn had aired on British televisions since 2005. The three supporting characters were The Shopkeeper, Eddie the dog and Gus the gorilla.

=== Clothing accessories ===
In 2017, Turnbull & Asser launched three limited-edition pocket squares featuring Mr Benn in a James Bond style, corresponding with an exhibition of original Mr Benn artworks at the Illustration Cupboard which at that time was next door in St James. Originally four different designs, the 2017 Westminster Attack caused the decision to not produce the final image of Mr Benn facing his adversaries outside the Houses of Parliament and next to Westminster Bridge. The original picture can be seen on the Illustration Cupboard blog.

=== Doctor Who ===
The 2024 Doctor Who Christmas special "Joy to the World" features a shot of a statue of the Red Knight as seen in the eponymous episode of Mr Benn as well as two hats behind a glass wall on which is written "Mr Benn's any era clothes". It heavily implies that the episode was inspired by it.

== See also ==
- The Secret Life of Walter Mitty
