= List of Ben & Holly's Little Kingdom episodes =

Ben & Holly's Little Kingdom is a British preschool animated television series. The show was created by Neville Astley and Mark Baker, and produced by Astley Baker Davies and Entertainment One (the companies responsible for Peppa Pig). The series first aired on 6 April 2009, and aired its last episode on 24 December 2013. A total of 100 episodes were produced.

== Series overview ==
Series	Episodes	Originally released	
Series	Episodes	First released	Last released
1	50	6 April 2009	7 February 2011
2	50	2 July 2012	24 December 2013

== Episodes ==
=== Series 1 (2009–2011) ===
No. overall	No. in series	Title	Original release date
1	1	"The Royal Fairy Picnic"	6 April 2009
Holly invites Ben to the annual royal fairy picnic. King Thistle hopes there it won't be a repeat of last year's magical jelly flood.
2	2	"Gaston The Ladybird"	7 April 2009
Ben and Holly try to cheer up their friend Gaston by tidying his cave, but they do realise that he likes it the way it was.
3	3	"Holly's Magic Wand"	8 April 2009
Holly needs her wand to do magic. But one day, Holly loses her wand and is very sad. Ben uses his elf skills to find it again.
4	4	"The Elf Farm"	9 April 2009
Ben and Holly visit the elf farm to collect an egg for King Thistle's breakfast, but while they're in there, an enormous chicken escapes and runs amok.
5	5	"Daisy and Poppy"	10 April 2009
Daisy and Poppy borrow Fleur's magic wand, escape from the castle, and turn the whole kingdom into rabbits, frogs and birds.
6	6	"Queen Thistle's Teapot"	13 April 2009
Holly accidentally smashes the Queen's new teapot, and Ben tries to help her repair it, but it doesn't work.
7	7	"The Frog Prince"	8 September 2009
Holly mistakenly turns Ben into a frog, and doesn't make things worse by trying to change him back to normal. She turns Ben into a bird, and then a rabbit, before Nanny Plum comes and reverses the spell.
8	8	"The King's Busy Day"	9 September 2009
Holly's father struggles to cope during a busy day, in which he has to launch a boat, judge a fruit and vegetable competition and make a speech at a dance festival.
9	9	"Fun and Games"	10 September 2009
Ben and Holly are having fun playing together in the meadow. Holly gets frustrated when Ben uses his elf skills to win all the games. Then Ben gets frustrated when Holly uses her magic skills to win all the games.
10	10	"King Thistle is Not Well"	11 September 2009
King Thistle catches a cold, so Ben, Holly and Nanny Plum collect the ingredients for a magic potion to make him heal sooner or later.
11	11	"The Lost Egg"	14 September 2009
Ben, Holly and Gaston the Ladybird find a large egg in the meadow. A tiny chick hatches from the egg and the children must find the mummy bird.
12	12	"The Elf Games"	15 September 2009
Ben is in training for the elf games, Holly wants to join in but the rules state there is no flying or magic allowed. Ben gives Holly one last chance to join in without using her magic.
13	13	"Nanny Plum's Lesson"	16 September 2009
Nanny Plum teaches the girls some important fairy rules. However, when Nanny Plum is accidentally blown everything by a strong wind, Ben, Holly, Violet, Strawberry and Gaston must come to her rescue.
14	14	"The Elf Factory"	17 September 2009
The Elf Factory is deep down in the roots of The Great Elf Tree. It is nearly Christmas time and the elves are busy making toys. When there is a problem with the toys, a little bit of magic saves the day.
15	15	"Mrs Witch"	18 September 2009
Queen Thistle reads Ben and Holly a book about a nasty witch, so Nanny takes the children to a real one who lives in the forest. But Nanny is rude to the witch, who freezes her with magic.
16	16	"Elf Joke Day"	21 September 2009
Ben and Holly help the Wise Old Elf play a trick on Nanny Plum for Elf Joke Day, but she does not see the funny side and gets her revenge by turning the Wise Old Elf into a giant snail.
17	17	"King Thistle's New Clothes"	22 September 2009
Snooty King and Queen Marigold are coming to visit, but when the King's new clothes get dirty Nanny cleans them and accidentally shrinks them all.
18	18	"Elf School"	23 September 2009
Holly and Nanny Plum join Ben at Elf School, where the Wise Old Elf tells Holly and Nanny Plum that strictly no magic should be used. All the Elf children are very good at building their toys.
19	19	"The Royal Golf Course"	23 June 2010
A naughty mole disturbs King Thistle's royal golf course, so a gnome is enlisted to help drive it away. Soon the gnome is ordering the Elves around, turning the golf course into a crazy golf course!
20	20	"Morning, Noon & Night"	23 June 2010
The Wise Old Elf teaches the Elves how to tell the time, and takes Ben and Holly to see the big grandfather clock at the top of the Elf Tree.
21	21	"Gaston's Visit"	23 June 2010
Gaston catches a cold, so King Thistle invites him to stay at the castle while his old home is being repaired due to a leak in the roof.
22	22	"A Trip to the Seaside"	23 June 2010
Holly joins Ben and his family on an Elf trip to the seaside, and Mr Elf tells her that no magic is to be used. But when they realise that no one has remembered to pack lunch, they ask Holly to use her magic to make some.
23	23	"Ben's Birthday Card"	24 June 2010
Holly has forgotten Ben's birthday and returns home to make him a birthday card. After a disaster in the kitchen, Nanny has stopped all magic for one day, so Holly has to make the card herself.
24	24	"Books"	24 June 2010
The duo visit the Wise Old Elf in the Great Elf Library to find out where stars go in the night-time.
25	25	"Betty Caterpillar"	25 June 2010
The duo befriends a caterpillar called Betty, who wishes she could fly, and King Thistle advises them to fatten her up. They soon get a big surprise the next day!
26	26	"Queen Holly"	25 June 2010
Holly is left in charge of the Little Kingdom while her parents are away. However, though, it isn't as easy as it looks, especially when she tries to give people ice cream - it makes ice cream non-stop to the point it causes an ice cream flood.
27	27	"Tooth Fairy"	25 June 2010
Ben and Holly are excited when they learn that Nanny Plum is a Tooth Fairy at night, and go along with her to pick up a little girl's tooth. But the little girl is not so little - she's a human and much bigger than them!
28	28	"The Elf Windmill"	25 June 2010
King Thistle wants bread for his Royal breakfast, but there isn't any flour in the castle. Mr Elf takes Ben, Holly and Nanny Plum to the Elf Windmill to find out why it takes so long to make flour.
29	29	"The Elf Band"	25 June 2010
Holly and her parents try to impress the snobby King and Queen Marigold with help from the elf band.
30	30	"The Ant Hill"	25 June 2010
Things are going missing all over the Little Kingdom - Holly has lost her wand and Ben has lost his horn! Soon, they realise that ants are stealing their things, and try to convince the Queen Ant to give them back.
31	31	"Redbeard The Elf Pirate"	26 June 2010
Barnaby Elf's uncle, Redbeard the Elf Pirate, comes to visit the Little Kingdom, but he has lost his treasure. Ben, Holly, the Fairies and the Elves must help Redbeard follow the clues to track down the treasure.
32	32	"Tadpoles"	26 June 2010
Holly takes frogspawn home to look after but is shocked the following morning to discover it has turned into tadpoles.
33	33	"Cows"	26 June 2010
The children are at the Elf Farm, but to learn where milk comes from they must visit a Big Farm, to find cows. They travel to Lucy Big's Farm, where she shows them all the animals.
34	34	"Queen Thistle's Day Off"	26 June 2010
Queen Thistle wants to take a day off, so Ben, Holly, Nanny and the King have to look after the naughty twins, Daisy and Poppy, for the day. But even all the Elves in the Little Kingdom can't help them keep the twins out of trouble.
35	35	"Nature Class"	27 June 2010
Nanny Plum takes the Fairy children for a Nature Class in the woods and bumps into the Wise Old Elf, who is teaching a Nature Class to the Elf children.
36	36	"The Toy Robot"	27 June 2010
Out playing in the meadow, Ben, Holly and their friends find a broken toy robot. Holly fixes it with magic, but the robot does not behave as they thought it would, and soon it is trying to clean out the whole castle.
37	37	"Big Bad Barry"	5 July 2010
King Thistle wants fish for dinner, so he goes out fishing with Mr Elf, Ben and Holly on Mr Elf's boat. Mr Elf tells them a story about the biggest, villainous fish ever - Big Bad Barry. The King wants to catch Barry for supper.
38	38	"King Thistle's Birthday"	5 July 2010
King Thistle does not want to get any older so decides that no one must celebrate his birthday. But all of the Little Kingdom has been waiting to celebrate the King's birthday with a brilliant party.
39	39	"The Wand Factory"	6 July 2010
Holly accidentally breaks her wand and must go to the Wand Factory at the bottom of the Great Elf Tree to get it fixed.
40	40	"Camping Out"	7 July 2010
Holly goes on a camping trip with Ben and his parents, but they are soon joined by Mr Gnome, who is always hungry and sings funny songs.
41	41	"Dinner Party"	4 September 2010
Snooty King and Queen Marigold invite themselves round for dinner at King and Queen Thistle's Castle to sample Nanny Plum's cooking. Nanny; the best cook in the world, tries hard to cook special modern food.
42	42	"The Woodpecker"	4 September 2010
King Thistle takes up bird watching. Using his magic bird book, he spots a Woodpecker taking up residence in the Great Elf Tree. The King is keen for more birds, so is pleased when another makes a nest in the Royal Castle.
43	43	"Daisy & Poppy's Pet"	31 December 2010
The twins want a pet, so Nanny Plum sets out to get them one. She magics them up Pippin the hamster. The Wise Old Elf brings Pippin a hamster wheel, but Pippin runs too fast in it and breaks out of the castle.
44	44	"The Elf Rocket / Picnic on the Moon"	26 January 2011
(Part 1 of the Ben and Holly's Trip to the Moon special) After seeing a toy Elf rocket, the King orders a real rocket to fly to the moon. Elf honor is a stake at the Elves making a rocket in record time. For the trip, Nanny packs a picnic. (Part 2 of the Ben and Holly's Trip to the Moon special) The visitors land on the Moon and begin to explore. They meet so friendly aliens and have fun making Sandcastles and sharing their picnic. Nanny creates a jelly flood, but, luckily, the Aliens love to eat Jelly!
45	45	"Lucy's Picnic"	28 January 2011
The elf and fairy children learn how the rubbish left after a picnic can be recycled into new toys, and Lucy has a look around the Little Kingdom.
46	46	"Acorn Day"	31 January 2011
A gang of squirrels appears at the Great Elf Tree determined to store acorns inside, but the Wise Old Elf has other ideas.
47	47	"The Elf Submarine"	1 February 2011
Ben, Holly, Nanny Plum and Mr Elf set sail to retrieve Redbeard the Elf Pirate's sunken ship treasure with the Elf Submarine, but Big Bad Barry tries to prevent them.
48	48	"Visiting the Marigolds"	2 February 2011
Everyone is visiting snooty King and Queen Marigold's Castle. King and Queen Marigold give them a which features a room made of ice sculptures and an upside-down room.
49	49	"The Party"	3 February 2011
It's the twins' birthday party and chaos ensues when their little friends arrive. The Wise Old Elf tries to entertain them, but they prove too much of a handful, turning the Wise Old Elf into a mouse.
50	50	"Snow / The North Pole"	15 December 2011
(Part 1 of the First Christmas Special) The youngsters help when Mr Elf hasn't forgotten to deliver the last box of toys to Father Christmas. (Part 2 of the First Christmas Special) The elf airplane makes an emergency crash-landing en route to delivering the last batch of Christmas presents.

=== Series 2 (2012–2013) ===
No. overall	No. in series	Title	Original release date
51	1	"Giants in the Meadow"	2 July 2012
Lucy's father is digging up the meadow, and the Little Kingdom is in danger.
52	2	"Mrs Fig's Magic School"	3 July 2012
Despite protests from the Wise Old Elf, Ben accompanies Holly to her first day at Magic School.
53	3	"Daisy & Poppy's Playgroup"	4 July 2012
After the disappearance of Mrs Fotheringill, Mrs Elf becomes the twins' new teacher.
54	4	"No Magic Day"	5 July 2012
It is the time of the year for the blue moon which gives no fairy magic for one day of the year and also stops the Elf Factory's "Great Elf Engine" from working - and the fuel is magic.
55	5	"Spies"	6 July 2012
Ben and Holly and their friends learn all about spying when both Nanny Plum and the Wise Old Elf compete to build a boat for King Thistle that would not be laughed at by snooty King and Queen Marigold at the boating carnival.
56	6	"Hard Times"	9 July 2012
After a mishap involving a demonstration of the magic money chest and buttons, King Thistle tries to do a job to get a gold coin, with chaotic results.
57	7	"Gaston Goes To School"	10 July 2012
Ben, Holly and King Thistle decide to send Gaston to Miss Jolly's pet school and he meets his friends there. But soon, Gaston learns how good it is to be himself.
58	8	"Elf Rescue"	11 July 2012
With so many rescue missions, Elf Rescue needs a helping hand from Children Rescue.
59	9	"Lucy's School"	12 July 2012
Nanny Plum, Gaston, Ben and Holly go with Lucy to her school on Nature Day, whilst trying to not be seen by her friends or her teacher, Miss Cookie. Imagine all the chaos that follows!
60	10	"Baby Dragon"	13 July 2012
Ben, Holly and their friends adopt a dragon and they name him Dave, and Gaston gets furious. Later, Ben, Holly, Nanny Plum and Mr Elf take him back home to Dragonland.
61	11	"Dolly Plum"	16 July 2012
Daisy and Poppy turn Nanny Plum into a doll, and Queen Thistle turns Nanny Plum back to normal, making the twins cry. So the Wise Old Elf copies it and in a matter of seconds, it becomes very popular, much to Nanny Plum's dismay.
62	12	"The Lost City"	17 July 2012
Redbeard the Elf Pirate sets sail to find the lost city, but soon finds himself in trouble and in need of saving.
63	13	"The Shooting Star"	18 July 2012
Ben & Holly meet some of the friendly aliens from 'Picnic on the Moon', and a small green one called Zyros, who are on holiday when their flying saucer crashed into Earth.
64	14	"Nanny's Magic Test"	19 July 2012
Nanny's magic license is out of date and, to get a new magic license, she must pass a test, set by the Wise Old Elf.
65	15	"Gaston To The Rescue"	20 July 2012
Out looking for Gaston, after banning him from the castle, the Elves and Fairies come across a speaking door that leads to the dwarf mine. Once in, they find they can't get out. Who will save them?
66	16	"Miss Cookie's Nature Trail"	21 July 2012
Miss Cookie's class is out on a nature trail in the Little Kingdom! It is up to Ben and Holly to prevent the Elves and Fairies from being discovered by the big children and their teacher.
67	17	"The New Wand"	22 July 2012
Wandy gets a cold and is very ill, Holly is given a replacement wand. This new wand can do lots of things that Wandy can't, as soon becomes the favourite.
68	18	"Superheroes"	23 July 2012
The children are playing a game of superheroes. When Strawberry takes her super villain a bit too far, it is up to 'Elf Man' and 'Fairy Girl' to save the day.
69	19	"Mrs Witch's Spring Clean"	24 July 2012
Ben, Holly and Nanny Plum help Mrs Witch have a bit of a clear-out. The children bring the magical items back home, but in the wrong hands, they cause a few problems.
70	20	"The Fruit Harvest"	25 July 2012
It is harvest day. The Elves and Fairies enlist the help of Mr Gnome in picking blackberries. If only they could prevent him from devouring them all.
71	21	"Uncle Gaston"	26 July 2012
Three baby ladybirds, Amber, Emerald and Keith, have come to stay at their uncle Gaston's for the day. The baby ladybirds are exhausting! So Ben and Holly help Gaston to keep them entertained.
72	22	"Plumbing"	27 July 2012
The bath tap at the Little Castle is dripping, so the elf plumber is called. It's a bigger job than first expected, but with snooty King and Queen Marigolds coming around, there's not much time to get it looking tip-top.
73	23	"Big Ben & Holly"	28 July 2012
When a spell accidentally goes wrong, Ben and Holly grow to human size! Now they can play with Lucy and her friends and want to stay big forever!
74	24	"Daisy & Poppy Go Bananas"	29 July 2012
Granny Thistle comes to visit and gives Daisy and Poppy a powerful magical wand. The twins escape from the castle and go bananas!
75	25	"Mr Elf takes a Holiday"	30 July 2012
Mr Elf is overworked, so King Thistle sentences him to a holiday. He isn't too pleased. Mrs Elf and Ben, however, are overjoyed by the news. Meanwhile, Nanny takes over the food deliveries.
76	26	"Honey Bees"	31 July 2012
Ben and Holly go to the beehive to see how honey is made. The Wise Old Elf is the beekeeper and proceeds to show the children his special way of collecting honey.
77	27	"Lucy's Sleepover"	1 August 2012
Holly shrinks Lucy so she can play in the Little Kingdom. She has fun flying on Gaston the Ladybird and is invited to a sleepover at the Little Castle.
78	28	"Miss Jolly's Riding Club"	2 August 2012
Ben, Holly, and their friends go on a snail trek with Miss Jolly. The trek goes well until the snails head straight toward the Elf Farm and Mr Elf's cabbages.
79	29	"Springtime"	3 August 2012
Springtime in the Little Kingdom brings out tulips, daffodils, hedgehogs, and two very hungry gnomes. Nanny Plum and the Wise Old Elf come up with a plan to stop the gnomes from eating everything in sight.
80	30	"Pirate Treasure"	4 August 2012
When Captain Squid leaves his treasure map in the Little Kingdom, Redbeard the Elf Pirate leads Ben, Holly and Nanny Plum on a treasure hunt. The map says the treasure is deep underwater and guarded by a mermaid and a golden sea monster!
81	31	"Gaston Goes to the Vet"	5 August 2012
Ben Elf and his parents are going on holiday in the elf truck but Gaston the Ladybird, has devoured the car keys! Ben and Holly take Gaston to the vet to retrieve the keys.
82	32	"Granny & Granpapa"	6 August 2012
A magical card arrives at the Little Kingdom, inviting everyone to a party at Granny and Granpapa Thistle's castle. The party is full of wonderful surprises and Granpapa shows everyone his funny hobbies.
83	33	"The Dwarf Mine"	7 August 2012
Strange pits are appearing throughout the Little Kingdom. It's the Dwarves, deep underground, digging for treasure! A solution must be found before the Dwarves dig up everything.
84	34	"Lucy's Elf & Fairy Party"	8 August 2012
Lucy celebrates her birthday with an Elf and Fairy party. Lucy's father does a magic show but things get a bit out of hand when Holly and her friends join in.
85	35	"Planet Bong / Planet Bong Episode 2"	9 August 2012
(Part 1 of the Ben and Holly go to Planet Bong special) Zyros [from The Shooting Star] contacts Ben and Holly, and asks for the Wise Old Elf's help to save their planet. (Part 2 of the Ben and Holly go to Planet Bong special) Ben and Holly and their friends go to Zyros' home planet, where they meet all manner of alien creatures and the Great Leader.
86	36	"The Queen Bakes Cakes"	11 August 2012
Mrs Fig's magic school has been crashed by a falling apple. A cake stall is arranged to pay for the repairs, but no one can eat Queen Thistle's cakes.
87	37	"The Witch Competition"	12 August 2012
A young witch is planning on moving into Mrs Witch's house. Mrs Witch has to come out of retirement to keep her place in the Little Kingdom.
88	38	"Journey to the Centre of the Earth"	13 August 2012
Naughty Daisy and Poppy magic their teacher, Mrs Fotheringill, to the centre of the Earth. Granpapa Thistle leads Ben and Holly on a dangerous mission through dinosaurs and volcanoes to find the missing teacher.
89	39	"Redbeard's Rainbow"	14 August 2013
They say that at the end of every rainbow is a pot of gold. So rainbows are a pirate's best friend - if you're looking for treasure. But, if like Captain Squid, you are hiding treasure. Rainbows are a pirate's worst enemy!
90	40	"Fox Cubs"	15 August 2013
There is a new fox cub leader in The Little Kingdom. It's Nanny Plum, known as Fluffy Owl. Whilst attempting to earn their adventure badges the fox cubs find themselves stuck at the top of Mount Everest with no way down.
91	41	"Nanny Plum and the Wise Old Elf Swap Jobs for One Whole Day"	16 August 2013
Nanny Plum believes she works harder than The Wise Old Elf. The Wise Old Elf believes he works harder than Nanny Plum! King Thistle commands them to swap jobs for the day to settle the fight.
92	42	"The Very Important Person"	17 August 2013
King Leopold has announced he is paying a visit to The Little Kingdom. Everyone is very excited that they have a VIP coming and preparing to welcome him in style. King Thistle is feeling left out... he is a king too!
93	43	"Bunty II"	18 August 2013
Mr Elf has built a new boat to replace the one Big Bad Barry devoured. So Mr Elf is very nervous when the king commands him to take them all on a cruise to a tropical paradise. Will Big Bad Barry strike again?
94	44	"Fathers Day"	19 August 2013
It's Father's Day in The Little Kingdom and all the dads are given a day off work to go and play together in the meadow. Ben and Holly are surprised to learn that The Wise Old Elf is a dad too, with three sons of his own.
95	45	"Gaston's Birthday"	20 August 2013
King Thistle's birthday has come around again and he's not happy. He does not want a birthday party but everything has been prepared. Poor Gaston the Ladybird has never had a birthday party...
96	46	"The Mermaid"	21 August 2013
Lucy and her father are having a quiet, relaxing day boating on the lake. They fish out an old glittery mirror on the bottom of the lake and decide to keep it. However, the mirror belongs to a mermaid who needs it back.
97	47	"Daisy & Poppy Go to the Museum"	22 August 2013
Daisy, Poppy, and their toddlers are taken on a trip to the big museum by their teacher, Mrs Fotheringill. The naughty toddlers cause chaos, and, before too long, Mrs Fotheringill has zapped back to the Stone Age.
98	48	"Chickens Ride West"	23 August 2013
King Thistle wants a boiled egg for breakfast, but Mr Elf has forgotten to bring him one. The Elves decide to deliver the King the chickens from the Elf Farm so he can have an egg whenever he likes!
99	49	"Gaston is Lost"	24 August 2013
Ben and Holly want to play with Gaston the Ladybird, but he is missing. Nanny Plum uses her magic crystal ball to retrace Gaston's steps and find his whereabouts.
100	50	"Ben & Holly's Christmas / Ben & Holly's Christmas Episode 2"	24 December 2013
(Part 1 of the Second Christmas Special) A disguised Father Christmas pays a surprise visit to the Little Kingdom to check on the Christmas preparations. The Elves are busy making all of the toys and Nanny Plum is in control of the crackers. Everything is going according to plan until King Thistle gets trapped in a cracker, Queen Thistle gets wrapped up as a present, and the Wise Old Elf and the pine elves get stuck in a Christmas Tree. (Part 2 of the Second Christmas Special) Ben and Holly set out on a Christmas rescue mission to save the 3 trapped grown-ups from Part 1, but they all end up in Lucy's house for a Merry Christmas with Lucy and her family!
