= David Rintoul =

Scottish actor (born 1948)

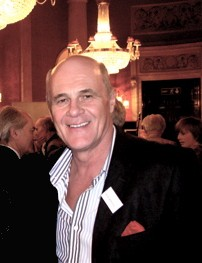
- Rintoul in 2009
- Born: David Wilson; 29 November 1948 (age 77); Aberdeen, Scotland
- Spouse: Vivien Heilbron (m. 2008)

David Rintoul (né Wilson; 29 November 1948) is a Scottish stage and television actor. Rintoul was born in Aberdeen, Scotland. He studied at the University of Edinburgh, and won a scholarship to study at the Royal Academy of Dramatic Art in London.

== Theatre career ==
Rintoul has worked extensively in theatre with companies including the Royal National Theatre and Royal Shakespeare Company. His appearances have included Shakespeare's A Midsummer Night's Dream, Henry IV, As You Like It, and the title role in Macbeth. Other stage appearances include George Bernard Shaw's Candida and Funny Girl. In 2010 he played Charles Dickens in Andersen's English, the new play by Sebastian Barry.

=== Selected theatre roles ===
- Epsom Downs, Joint Stock Theatre Company, 1977
- King Humanitie, Ane Satyre of the Thrie Estaites, Scottish Theatre Company, Edinburgh International Festival, 1982
- The Speculator by David Greig – 1999 Traverse Theatre production at the Royal Lyceum Theatre, played John Law, and other roles
- Remembrance of Things Past, Cottesloe and Olivier theatres, November 2000 – April 2001, as Charlus
- Dirty Dancing (Aldwych Theatre, London) as Dr Jake Houseman
- Gaslight (Royal Lyceum Theatre, Edinburgh)
- Andersen's English by Sebastian Barry (Out of Joint and Hampstead Theatre), as Charles Dickens, 2010
- Nell Gwynn (Shakespeare's Globe) as Arlington, 2015

== Television and film career ==
Rintoul's film credits include the title role in Legend of the Werewolf (1975), A.D. (1985), Unrelated (2007) and Is Anybody There? (2008). In 2010, he starred in the film The Ghost Writer with Pierce Brosnan and Ewan McGregor.

In 1980, he played the role of Mr Darcy in a BBC television adaptation by Fay Weldon of Pride and Prejudice. From 1993 to 1996 he played Doctor Finlay in the television series of the same name. His other television appearances include Prince Regent, Taggart, Hornblower and the Agatha Christie's Poirot film, The Mysterious Affair at Styles. He voices three characters, Granddad Dog, Mr. Bull and Dr. Brown Bear, in the popular children's series Peppa Pig. He also voiced the knight 'Sir Boris' in the 1999 animation The Big Knights and the arch villain Cut Throat Jake in the newer version of Captain Pugwash. He played the role of Noah in the 2013 History Channel's The Bible. In 2016 he portrayed Aerys Targaryen in the HBO series Game of Thrones in Season 6.

=== Selected television roles ===
- Lord Peter Wimsey (TV series) -Five Red Herrings as Jock Graham (1975)
- 1990 as Philip Ross (1 episode, “You'll Never Walk Alone”, 1978)
- Lillie (1978) as Charles Longley
- Prince Regent (1979) as Dr John Willis
- Pride and Prejudice as Fitzwilliam Darcy (1980 adaptation)
- Agatha Christie's Poirot -The Mysterious Affair at Styles as John Cavendish (1990)
- Taggart (2 episodes, 1990 and 2005)
- Doctor Finlay as Dr. John Finlay (1993–1996)
- The Inspector Alleyn Mysteries -The Nursing Home Murder (1993) as Sir John Phillips
- Captain Pugwash (1998 version) as Cut Throat Jake / Governor of Portobello / Lieutenant Scratchwood / The Admiral
- The Big Knights (1999) as Sir Boris
- Hornblower as Dr. Clive, Ship's Surgeon (2001 and 2003)
- Ben and Holly's Little Kingdom (2010-2013) as Redbeard the Elf Pirate
- Grandpa in My Pocket (2010) as Heave Ho Horatio
- Midsomer Murders “Blood on the Saddle” (2010) as Jack Fincher
- Peppa Pig (2015, 2019) as Granddad Dog / Mr. Bull / Dr. Brown Bear
- Game of Thrones (2016) as Aerys II Targaryen
- The Crown (2019) as Michael Adeane

=== Selected video games ===
- El Shaddai: Ascension of the Metatron as Azazel
- Final Fantasy XIV: Shadowbringers as Ran'jit
- RuneScape as Zaros
- Warhammer: Vermintide 2 as Bardin Goreksson
- Baldur's Gate 3 as Bane
- Blasphemous 2 as Trifón
- Wallace & Gromit's Grand Adventures as Duncan McBiscuit

=== Audiobook narration ===
Rintoul has narrated many audiobooks, including Frederick Forsyth's The Day of the Jackal and J. G. Ballard's Millennium People. In 1986, he recorded unabridged readings of all of Ian Fleming's James Bond novels and short stories for Chivers Audio Books (with the exception of The Spy Who Loved Me, which has a first person female narrator). He also later recorded Nobody Lives Forever and Licence to Kill, written by John Gardner. Whilst reading the prose with his usual speaking voice, Rintoul speaks Bond's dialogue with a mild Scottish accent.

He also narrated Robert Harris's Dictator, the final volume of his Cicero trilogy. Rintoul took over this role from Bill Wallis, who had read the previous two books, Imperium and Lustrum, but died two years before Dictator's publication. He has narrated two young people's books, The Boggart (2009) and The Boggart and the Monster (2013) written by Susan Cooper. Since 2015, he has been narrating the character of Sir James Powell in the audio drama series John Sinclair – Demon Hunter. In 2016 Rintoul narrated Philippe Sands' East West Street – the Origins of "Genocide" and "Crimes Against Humanity", and in 2018 he narrated Dorothy Dunnett's novel of Macbeth King Hereafter.

Further Media

Rintoul has narrated the Deep Dive podcast since 2026.

== Personal life ==
Rintoul is married to actress Vivien Heilbron. A friend and University of Edinburgh classmate of Ian Charleson, Rintoul contributed a chapter to the 1990 book, For Ian Charleson: A Tribute.
