= Peter Tinniswood =

British writer (1936–2003)

Peter Tinniswood (21 December 1936 – 9 January 2003) was an English radio and TV comedy scriptwriter, and author of a series of popular novels. He was born in Liverpool, but grew up above a dry cleaner's on Eastway in Sale, Cheshire.

== Early career ==
Tinniswood attended Sale Boys' Grammar School. His career began in journalism. He spent four years in Sheffield from 1958, first working for The Star and then for the Sheffield Telegraph, where he was a leader writer and specialised in feature writing. He won widespread admiration for a week-long series Travels with a Donkey, an account of a tramp round the Peak District with a reluctant donkey.

== Television and radio ==
In 1964, Tinniswood collaborated with his long-term writing partner David Nobbs on the BBC sketch show The Frost Report and the comedy Lance At Large, a sitcom starring Lance Percival in which Percival's character, Alan Day, was involved in different scenarios and meeting different people in each episode. The short-lived ITV series Never Say Die (1970) drew on Tinniswood's days as a hospital porter. Set in Victoria Memorial Hospital, the show derived much of its comedy from the interactions between patients and staff. It starred Reginald Marsh and Patrick Newell. Tinniswood based the BBC comedy I Didn't Know You Cared (1975–1979) on his novels. Featuring the Brandons, a dour northern family, the programme ran until 1979, and featured Liz Smith, Robin Bailey, John Comer and Stephen Rea. In 1980, the BBC produced a series based on other Tinniswood books, featuring the character the Brigadier, an erstwhile cricketer and latterly raconteur, played by Robin Bailey. Some of the stories were adapted for BBC Radio 4. The series was remade in 1985 for Channel 4.

For ITV in 1983, Tinniswood wrote The Home Front, again set in the north of England. It starred Brenda Bruce as Mrs Place, a nosey, arrogant mother who lorded it over her three children. Two years later ITV produced Mog, based on Tinniswood's 1970 novel and starring Enn Reitel as the title character. The episodes were written by Ian La Frenais and Dick Clement, but it was not a success. Also in 1985, was South Of The Border starring Brian Glover as Edgar Rowley, a Yorkshireman forced to migrate to the south of England.

In later years, Tinniswood's output was mostly for Radio 4 and included the continuing adventures of Uncle Mort and Carter Brandon in Uncle Mort's North Country, Uncle Mort's South Country and Uncle Mort's Celtic Fringe and a series about poacher Winston Hayballs, his "bit of fluff" Nancy and her family adapted from his novel "Winston". Liz Goulding, his second wife, played Rosie.

A lifelong pipe smoker, Peter Tinniswood died of throat cancer at the age of 66. Since his death, the Writers' Guild of Great Britain and the Society of Authors have jointly administered in his memory the annual Tinniswood Award, to honour the best original radio drama script broadcast in the UK during the previous year, with a prize of £3,000 for the winner.

== TV credits ==
- That Was The Week That Was (1962)
- The Dick Emery Show (1963)
- Lance At Large (1964)
- The Frost Report (1966)
- Roy Hudd (1970)
- Never Say Die (1970)
- I Didn't Know You Cared (1975)
- Tales From A Long Room (1980) (BBC)
- The Home Front (1983)
- Mog (1985)
- South Of The Border (1985)
- Tales From A Long Room (1985) (Channel 4)
- Duck Patrol (1998)

== Novels and other fiction ==
The Brandon Family series:

- A Touch Of Daniel (1968) – Winner of the Author's Club First Novel Award and Book of the Month choice
- Mog (1970)
- I Didn't Know You Cared (1973) – Winner of the Winifred Holtby Memorial Prize from the Royal Society of Literature for best regional novel.
- Except You're A Bird (1974)
- The Home Front (1982)
- Call it a Canary (1985)
- Uncle Mort’s North Country (1986)
- Uncle Mort’s South Country (1990)

Cricketing Tales and Sketches: (a table of the individual pieces in these books is given at the foot of this section).

- Tales From A Long Room (1981)
- More Tales From A Long Room (1982)
- Collected Tales From A Long Room (1982) – a compilation of the above two titles
- The Brigadier Down Under (1983)
- The Brigadier In Season (1984)
- The Brigadier’s Brief Lives (1984)
- The Brigadier’s Tour (1985)
- The Brigadier's Collection (1986) – a compilation of 'The Brigadier’s Brief Lives’ and 'The Brigadier’s Tour’
- Tales from Witney Scrotum (1987)
- Witney Scrotum (1995) – despite a similar title to the above, this is a different set of stories

Hayballs and its sequel:

- Hayballs (1989)
- Winston (1991)

Others:

- The Stirk Of Stirk (1974)
- Shemerelda (1981)
- Dolly’s War (1987)

The books listed above under the heading Cricketing Tales And Sketches contain short stories and other humorous pieces as shown here:

#	Tales From A Long Room	More Tales From A Long Room	The Brigadier Down Under	The Brigadier In Season	Tales From Witney Scrotum	Witney Scrotum
1	Root's Boot	Witney Scrotum	The Explanation	The Start of the Season	The Dedication	The Commodore
2	Our Own Dear Queen	The Boys of Summer	The Landfall	Stumped!	The Introduction	Mentioned in Dispatches
3	The Ditherers	Batman	First Impressions	A Day in the Life of	Hitting the Truth	Slakehouse
4	'Blackstop'	Five Non-Cricketers	A Day Out	Harold Salisbury	A Walk with Miss Roebuck	Himmelweit Revisited
5	What Do I Mean By?	Sibson	Before The Match	A Glimpse into the Future	The Third Man	In Dock
6	The Lady Wife	The Royal Wedding	First Dispatches From The Front	The Party	Souvenirs	Mitchell Dever
7	The Groundsman's Horse	Hard Times	Kingsley Kunzel	Carry on Goering	Tour de Force	The Trusty Old Lanchester
8	Mendip-Hughes	The Mole	Second Dispatches From The Front	The Holy Father	Famous Sons	Split Runciman
9	Cricketers' Cook Book	Apartheid	The Lady Wife Down Under	"Looknow" Hobson	Another Bloody Wife	Alternative Cricket
10	Polar Games	Blofeld Revisited	A Visit To Naunton	Miss Roebuck's Diaries: The Journals of a Cricketing Spinster	The Half Century	What-Ho, Vileness
11	The Ones That Got Away	Cricket Ahoy	Third Dispatches From The Front	The Brigadier in Season	The Great Day	Beryl
12	I Was There		The Return		Stop Press	The Bird Tapes
13	Incident at Frome					When Winter Comes
14						Farewell, My Lovelies
15						The Perfect Day
16						Cricketers' Quiz

Collected Tales From A Long Room – stories 1–13 are the same as 1–13 in Tales From A Long Room; stories 14–24 are the same as 1–11 in More Tales From A Long Room.

The Brigadier’s Brief Lives – contains the following short sketches:

1. Miss Petula Clark
2. Lord Carrington
3. Mr Rupert Murdoch
4. Mr Richard Baker
5. Sir John Mills
6. Mr Ray Buckton
7. Mr E. W. Swanton
8. Lord Wilson
9. Mr Kevin Keegan
10. Mr Norman St John Stevas
11. Sir Douglas Bader
12. Mr Roy Jenkins
13. Sir Robin Day
14. Miss Jan Leeming
15. Prince Philip
16. Mr Andrew Lloyd-Webber
17. Lord Goodman
18. Miss Jilly Cooper
19. The Duke of Westminster
20. Mr David Frost
21. Mr Laurie McMenamy
22. The Village Tea Lady
23. Miss Esther Tantzen
24. Andrew Previn
25. Lord Lichfield
26. Mr Geoffrey Boycott
27. Mrs Mary Whitehouse
28. Sir Richard Attenborough
29. Mr Robert Robinson
30. Mr Winston Churchill
31. Lord Longford
32. Mr Michael Parkinson
33. Mr Terry Wogan
34. Mr David Attenborough
35. Mr Roy Plomley
36. Mr Sebastian Coe
37. Miss Pamela Stephenson
38. Mr Arthur Scargill
39. Mr Roy Hattersley
40. Mr Ian Paisley
41. Cardinal Hume
42. Mr Ian Botham
43. Mr Michael Foot
44. Mr H. D. 'Dicky' Bird
45. Mr Frank Muir
46. Earl Spencer
47. Mr Jimmy Hill
48. Mr Leon Brittan
49. Mr Jimmy Savile OBE
50. Miss Elizabeth Jane Howard
51. Mr Tony Benn
52. Mr Tom Stoppard
53. Mr Bob Willis
54. Mr Barry Took
55. Miss Britt Ekland
56. Sir Peter Hall
57. Sir Geoffrey Howe
58. Mr James Cameron
59. Lord Lucan
60. Mr Ned Sherrin
61. The Archbishop of Canterbury
62. Princess Margaret
63. Miss Jean Rook
64. Mr Norman Tebbitt
65. Mr Mick Jagger
66. Mr Patrick Moore
67. Doctor David Owen
68. Mr Jimmy Young
69. Sir Anthont Blunt
70. Mr Clive Jenkins
71. Mr Enoch Powell
72. Lady Falklander
73. Miss Jan Morris
74. Mr Ludovic Kennedy
75. Mr Brian Redhead
76. Mr Brian Johnson
77. Mr Reginald Bosanquet
78. Mr Auberon Waugh
79. Mr Bill Sowerbutts
80. Mr Jim Laker
81. Mr Jackie Stewart
82. Lord Kagan
83. Sir Harold Macmillan
84. Mr John Wells
85. Mrs Shirley Williams
86. Mr Henry Cooper
87. Mr John Lennon
88. Mr Neil Kinnock
89. Captain Mark Phillips
90. Mr Winston Place
91. Dame Vera Lynn
92. Mr Feliks Topolski
93. Mr Alan Ayckbourn
94. Sir John Hackett

The Brigadier’s Tour – contains the following 116 short sketches:

The Introduction

The Captain: • Mr W. H. Wooller

The Vice-Captain: • Mr D. J. Insole

The Opening Batsmen: • Mr W. Place • Sir J. B. Hobbs • Mr J. B. Stollmeyer • Mr H. L. Collins • Mr W. Rhodes • Mr W. M. Lawry • Mr A. Jones • Mr S. M. Gavaskar • Mr A. R. Morris • Mr A. C. Maclaren • Mr F. A. Lowson • Mr Hanif Mohammed • Mr R. T. Simpson • Mr C. Milburn • Mr G. Boycott • Mr T. Meale

The Specialist Batsmen: • Mr F. R. Spofforth • Mr K. C. Bland • Mr E. de C. Weekes • Mr W. Watson • Mr C. B. Fry • Mr I. R. Redpath • Mr M. P. Donnelly • Mr C. H. Lloyd • Mr G. Gunn • Mr D. I. Gower • Sir D. G. Bradman • Mr G. R. Viswanath • Mr D. C. S. Compton • Mr A. D. Nourse • Nawab of Pataudi • Mr P. M. Roebuck • Mr V. T. Trumper • Mr I. V. A. Richards • Mr J. E. P. McMaster • Mr R. H. Spooner • Brigadier-General R. M. Poore • Mr D. W. Randall • Mr Z. Abbas • Mr K. D. Mackay • Mr G. L. Jessop • Charles Lawrence, Mullagh, Dick-A-Dick, Twopenny, Red Cap, Mosquito, King Cole, Peter, Cuzens, Tiger, Jim Crow, Bullocky, Dumas, Sundown • Mr D. B. Close • Mr R. L. Dias • Mr C. L. Walcott • Mr T. W. Hayward • Rt Rev D. S. Sheppard • Mr R. N. Harvey • Mr T. W. Graveney • Sir P. F. Warner • Mr A. R. Lewis • Mr A. R. Border • Mr H. Pilling

The All Rounders: • Mr W. G. Grace • Mr R. G. Garlick • Mr R. Benaud • Mr G. H. Hirst • Lord Constantine, Baron of Maraval and Nelson • Mr M. A. Noble • Mr R. M. Kapil Dev • Sir G. St. A. Sobers • Mr P. M. Walker • Mr M. J. Procter • Mr A. E. Trott • Mr F. E. Woolley • Sir F. M. M. Worrell • Mr W. R. Hammond • Mr I. T. Botham

The Fast Bowlers: • Mr J. B. Statham • Mr J. Barton King • Mr H. Larwood • Mr D. K. Lillee • Mr Fazal Mahmood • Mr R. V. Divecha • Mr W. Voce • Mr R. R. Lindwall • Mr W. J. O'Reilly • Mr R. G. D. Willis • Mr E. A. McDonald • Mr M. W. Tate • Mr T. Richardson • Mr I. J. Jones • Mr J. M. Gregory • Mr R. J. Hadlee • Mr F. E. Rumsey • Sir C. A. Smith

The Spinners: • Mr D. J. Shepherd • Mr C. V. Grimmett • Mr R. Peel • Mr P. H. Edmonds • Mr B. S. Bedi • Mr R. Tattersall • Mr J. E. Emburey • Mr H. J. Tayfield • Mr S. Ramadhin • Mr J. C. White • Mr D. V. P. Wright • Mr J. Briggs • Mr J. C. Laker • Mr L. R. Gibbs • Mr C. H. Parkin • Mr H. Verity • Mr Abdul Qadir • Mr C. Blythe

The Greatest Bowler Of Them All: • Mr S. F. Barnes

The Wicket Keepers: • Mr D. Tallon • Mr R. W. Marsh • Mr F. M. Engineer • Mr R. W. Taylor • Mr J. R. Reid • Mr J. G. Binks • Mr W. H. V. Levett

The Replacements: • The Replacements.

== Radio credits ==
=== Radio drama ===
(snt = BBC Saturday-Night Theatre; aft = BBC Afternoon Theatre, m = monologue)

- 1964 Hardluck Hall (6 x 30m, series of comedy plays)
- 1973 Sam's Wedding (aft)
- 1980 A Gifted Child (aft)
- 1981 An Occasional Day (aft)
- 1981 Stoker Leishman's Diaries (snt)
- 1981 The Siege
- 1981 The Bargeman's Comfort
- 1985 Crossing the Frontier
- 1987 A Touch Of Daniel (snt)
- 1987 The Village Fete rpt. 1988 (snt)
- 1990 A Small Union
- 1992 Tales from the Brigadier
- 1992 Two into Three
- 1993 The Governor's Consort (for M. Wimbush) R3
- 1995 Pen Pals
- 1997 Secret life of the Shed–feature on shed life–with P.Tinniswood
- 1997 Batteries not included-feature on batteries-with P.Tinniswood
- 1997 A Very Rare Bird Indeed
- 1998 The Last Obituary (for Billie Whitelaw; m), rpt 1999
- 1998 Visiting Julia: 6-episode comedy drama series
- 1998 Next time we might play better
- 1998 The wireless lady
- 1998 On the whole it's been jolly good (for Maurice Denham; m), rpt.1999
- 1998 Verona-a conspiracy of parrots (for Stephanie Cole; m), rpt 1999
- 1999 The House Swap
- 1999 The Scan
- 2000 Dorothy, a Manager's wife
- 2000 Age Gap
- 2000 The Packer
- 2000 Admiral of the night
- 2000 Monument (adapted from Eduardo De Filippo), dram.
- 2001 The Duvet Lady (Billie Whitelaw monologue)
- 2001 Mr. Reliable
- 2001 Tales from the Backbench (series 1, 4 episodes)
- 2001 On the train from Chemnitz
- 2001 Tales from the Backbench (series 2, 4 episodes)
- 2002 On the whole it's been jolly good, rpt
- 2002 The Air Raid
- 2002 Anton in Eastbourne (for Paul Scofield)
- 2003 The Goalkeeper's Boo-Boo
- 2010 The Visitor (BBC Radio 4 7 October 2010, Roy Hudd and Emma Fielding)

=== Serials ===
(numbers show no. of episodes)

- Home Again 6 (R4 2.6.1980– 7 July 1980 Robin Bailey/Doreen Mantle/Liz Goulding/David Troughton/Christopher Benjamin)
- Uncle Mort's North Country 5 (R4 21 July 1988 -18.8.1988 Stephen Thorne/Peter Skellern/Christian Rodska)
- Winston 6 (R4 26.4.1989– 31 May 1989 Maurice Denham/Christian Rodska/Shirley Dixon/Liz Goulding/Bill Wallis)
- Winston Comes To Town 6 (R4 1.1.1990– 5 February 1990 Maurice Denham/Shirley Dixon/Liz Goulding/Christian Rodska/Bill Wallis)
- Uncle Mort's South Country – Series 1 5 (R4 12 July 1990 9 August 1990 Stephen Thorne/Sam Kelly/Liz Goulding/Christian Rodska)
- Uncle Mort's South Country – Series 2 5 (R4 27 October 1990 -24.11.1990 Stephen Thorne/Sam Kelly/Liz Goulding/Christopher Good/Christian Rodska)
- Winston In Love 6 (R4 31 December 1990 -4.2.1991 Shirley Dixon/Bill Wallis/Maurice Denham/Liz Goulding/Christian Rodska)
- Winston In Europe 6 (R4 12 March 1992 -16.4.1992 Shirley Dixon/Maurice Denham/Liz Goulding/Christian Rodska/Bill Wallis)
- Winston Back Home 6 (R4 31 March 1994 -5.5.1994 Shirley Dixon/Maurice Denham/Liz Goulding/Christian Rodska/Bill Wallis)
- Uncle Mort's Celtic Fringe 5 (R4 12 February 1996 -11.3.1996 Stephen Thorne/Sam Kelly/Christian Rodska/Liz Goulding)
