= The Big Knights =

British animated children's television series

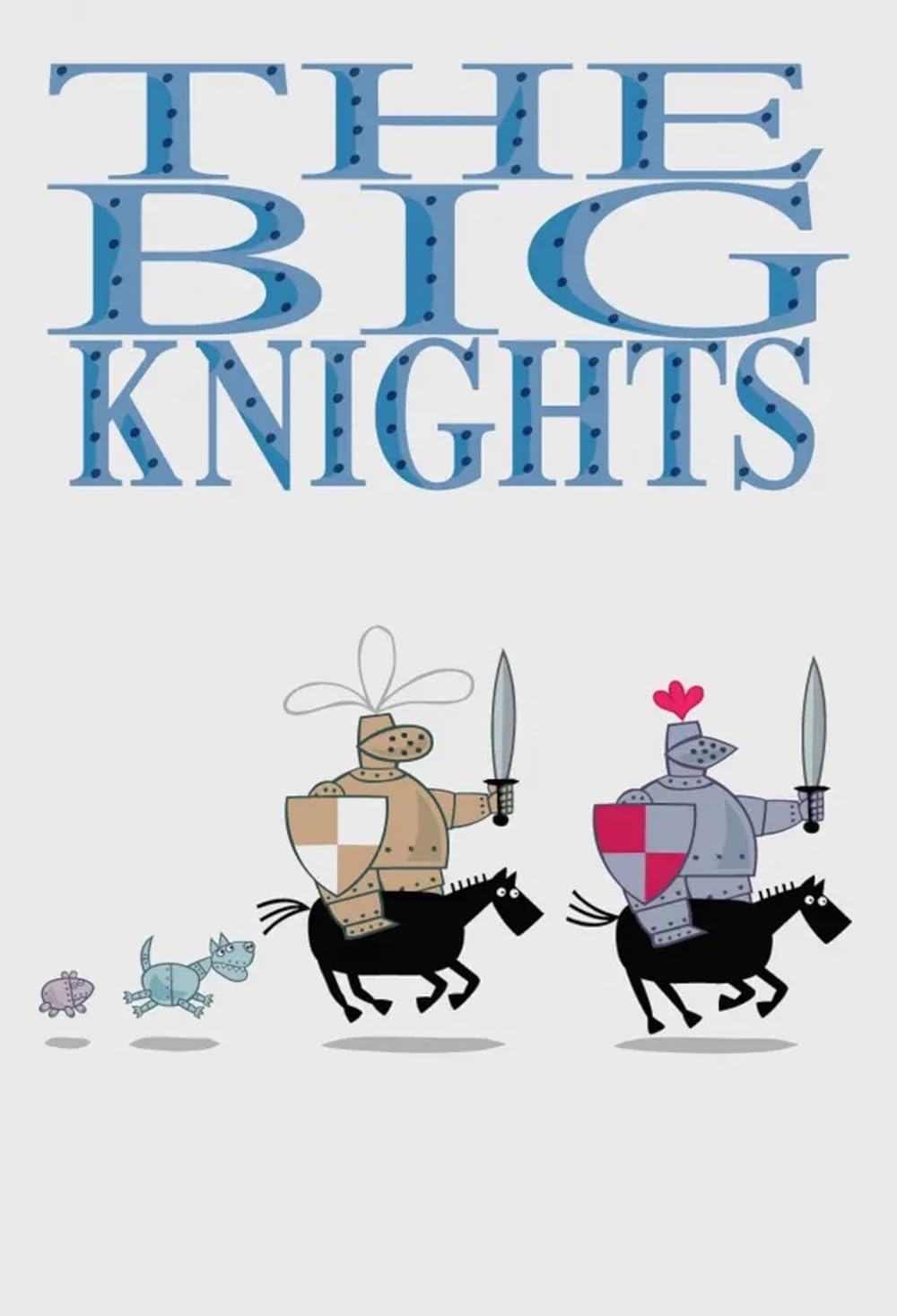
- Genre: Children's television series; Animated series
- Created by: Neville Astley; Mark Baker
- Written by: Neville Astley; Mark Baker
- Directed by: Neville Astley; Mark Baker
- Starring: Brian Blessed; David Rintoul; Alexander Armstrong; Timothy West; Prunella Scales; Morwenna Banks; Brian Sewell; John Sparkes; Summer Strallen; Scarlett Strallen; Kate Harbour; Gordon Kennedy; Jonathan Kydd; Kate Robbins; Enn Reitel
- Country of origin: United Kingdom
- Original language: English
- No. of series: 1
- No. of episodes: 13

Production
- Executive producers: Ann Anderson; Frank Taylor; Joan Lofts; Rick Morrison; Theresa Plummer-Andrews; Andrea Tran
- Producer: Claire Jennings
- Running time: 10 minutes
- Production companies: The Big Knights Ltd. BBC Worldwide; BBC Bristol

Original release
- Network: BBC Two
- Release: 19 December 1999 – 3 January 2000

The Big Knights is a British animated children's television series. It was created by Neville Astley and Mark Baker through their studio The Big Knights Ltd., in co-production with BBC Worldwide and in association with BBC Bristol. It was first broadcast on BBC Two over the Christmas season of 1999–2000. It was the first TV series to be digitally animated using CelAction 2D, while the first release of the software was still under development. It is mixed with cutout animation, and flash animation.

The stories tell the adventures of the two Big Knights, Sir Boris and Sir Morris, who are incredibly strong and brave, but are also incredibly dim-witted. They solve crises, usually of their own creation, but cause great destruction and mayhem in the process.

== Setting ==
The eponymous Big Knights live in Castle Big, on the edge of Forest Big, in the land of Borovia. Borovia seems to be situated somewhere in Europe. The knights themselves are indeed big; according to the title sequence they are 'the height of two men, the weight of four, the strength of sixteen'.

Borovia is rife with dragons, witches, trolls, ogres and a race of tiny people. The only real civilisation aside from Castle Big and King Otto's run-down palace is Börödzo (also referred to in the show as Village Börödzo), a small, rural country town. In the town square stood a large gold clock which the incompetent King Otto accidentally spent a unreasonable amount of money upon, only for the Big Knights to destroy it before the King arrived to view it.

The population is negligible, the economy is poor and the army consists mainly of Sir Boris, Sir Morris and their pets, as well as a host of lesser knights who, not being big, tend to take a back seat. This is mainly due to their snobbish elitism and general martial incompetence; they are much happier practising genuflection and brushing up their courtly manners. Aside from the medieval aesthetic, there does not seem to be much going for Borovia. The land has a fledgling television system (in black and white, consisting mainly of weather reports), at least one car (owned by the King) and an ill-fated hydroelectric dam, along with a failed proton power plant, which runs on pig manure. From this it becomes clear that Borovia (and by extension the show itself), rather than taking place merely in medieval times, is indeed in the present day, but is very dedicated to preserving a medieval aesthetic.

Borovia borders Möridia. Borovia also borders a land populated by vampires, which the Big Knights help to eliminate by accident rather than design, reviving the land's tourism industry. The Big Knights often cause trouble for Borovians.

== Main characters ==
- Sir Boris – The finest swordsman in the world. Noble, brave, honourable and chivalrous, and while not nearly as stupid as his brother Sir Morris, not terribly bright either. He is clad in silver armour. He is voiced by David Rintoul.
- Sir Morris – The most enthusiastic — but not the finest — swordsman in the world. He is incredibly stupid, dim-witted and somewhat childish, once believing that breakfast was magically made by the plates. His general method of dealing with problems is by hitting them with maximum force. He is illiterate and unable to read or write. He wears glasses, and is clad in bronze armour. He is voiced by Brian Blessed.
- Sir Horace – Sir Boris' loyal hound, clad in armour. He is a fine tracker dog, once tracking a flying crow that had stolen a golden key with his smell alone.
- Sir Doris – Sir Morris' pet hamster, likewise clad in plate armour. She has an insatiable appetite and will eat just about anything irrespective of its size or edibility, including Morris' fingers, a bicycle and man-eating plants.
- Mrs. Ethel Minion – The knights' housekeeper and de facto nanny, without whom they find survival rather difficult. She takes a matronly view toward her outsize charges. She seems to enjoy the housework and is shown to always be extremely tolerant of the Big Knights' antics.
- King Otto – King of Borovia, and a single parent. His occasional attempts to modernise his country often fail disastrously at the well-meaning hands of the Big Knights, as well as his desire to cut costs in most situations. He is insipid and dull-headed. He has two daughters, Princess Lucy and Princess Loretta, who manipulate him mercilessly.
- Princesses Lucy and Loretta – King Otto's twin daughters. Enthusiastic, naive and oblivious to danger and trouble. They absolutely love adventure and are keen admirers of the Big Knights.
- Wizard Zabobon – Wizard and advisor to King Otto. He is very old and it appears that he has never once thought of personal hygiene. He is an incompetent wizard but sometimes offers good advice, which the king ignores.
- Professor von Proton – The brain behind Borovia's drive to modernisation, he is also totally insane. He once covered the whole country in pig manure as a result of a quest for cheap renewable power.
- Queen Melissa – Queen of Moridia and incredibly wealthy. According to the programme website, she is rumoured to have been married to King Otto at some stage, but this is not mentioned in the show itself. Her fabulous wealth is a constant source of envy to King Otto.
- Sorceress Abigail – Cleaner, brighter, female version of Zabobon employed by Queen Melissa.
- Sir Kiftsgate – The apparent leader of a new breed of knights who know the difference between bowing to a Duke and an Earl but are totally useless at traditional knightly pastimes such as slaying dragons and ogres.

== Music ==
The theme tune was provided by the Rostov Balalaika orchestra.

== Cast ==
- Xander Armstrong as Narrator
- David Rintoul as Sir Boris
- Brian Blessed as Sir Morris
- Timothy West as King Otto
- Prunella Scales as Queen Melissa and Aunt Lily
- Morwenna Banks as The Old Witch, and as Ethel Minion, the Big Knights' housekeeper
- Brian Sewell as Sir Kiftsgate
- John Sparkes as Eeuuurgh the Troll, Professor Von Proton, Daring Sir Douglas and Dan Titchy
- Summer Strallen as Princess Lucy
- Scarlett Strallen as Princess Loretta
- Kate Harbour as Mindy
- Gordon Kennedy as Count Vampire and Ogre
- Jonathan Kydd as Neptune
- Kate Robbins as Sorceress Abigail and Aunt Iris
- Enn Reitel as Wizard Zabobon, Mayor Borozo and Jack Tiny

== Episodes ==
No.	Title	Channel	Original release date
1	"Knights in Distress"	BBC Two	19 December 1999
As part of his desire to modernise the kingdom, King Otto has commissioned a hydroelectric dam. Unfortunately, he is too mean to build it to the highest safety standards. On the day the dam is inaugurated, Sir Boris and Sir Morris (a.k.a. the Big Knights) are out rescuing Princesses Lucy and Loretta from a locked tower after the key is stolen by a bird, and later recovered by the knights' pets. The Big Knights' heroic rescue attempts inadvertently lead to Sir Morris being blasted into outer space, crashing back down to Earth and destroying the dam.
2	"Ethel and the Imp"	BBC Two	19 December 1999
When the Big Knights’ loyal housekeeper, Mrs. Minion, takes a hard-earned day off Sir Boris and Sir Morris fear they will starve to death. An Evil lmp magically materialises and offers to cook breakfast if Sir Morris will sign a contract dedicating his life to Evil. Sir Morris signs immediately but unknowingly. As a part of the contract between Morris and the Imp, Morris and Boris must face off against each other in a battle to the death just in time for Ethel to arrive home.
3	"Knight School"	BBC Two	21 December 1999
The Middle Ages have long been over and Borovia is a modern country but as far as the Big Knights are concerned, the Age of Chivalry is far from dead. Disillusioned with modern ideas of knighthood, they decide to set up an old-fashioned school for knights. Unknowingly, they attract hostile forces (witches, dragons and ogres) to which they ultimately turn against the Knights' and begin destroying Borovia.
4	"The Time Protonosphere"	BBC Two	21 December 1999
The exercise wheel in Sir Doris the Hamster’s cage develops an annoying squeak which Sir Boris and Sir Morris are unable to fix. So, they seek the advice of Professor von Proton, the finest mind in Borovia. The professor uses the Big Knights as guinea pigs to test his new time traveling machine, the Time Protonosphere, leading to mysterious, unforeseen circumstances.
5	"The Land of Vampires"	BBC Two	22 December 1999
Exhausted by their recent exploits, Sir Boris and Sir Morris yearn for a nice quiet, relaxing holiday, somewhere hot and sunny, and with absolutely no chance of danger or adventure. They travel to the Land of Vampires, a country with a formerly thriving tourism industry but falling to a much larger vampire population. The Big Knights, quite by accident, defeat the superior vampires and hence revive the country's tourism industry.
6	"Sir Morris & the Beanstalk"	BBC Two	22 December 1999
Sir Boris reads "Jack and the Beanstalk" to his brother as a bedtime story. Unfortunately, Sir Morris takes the fairy tale a little too literally, spending a ludicrous amount of money for his own bean and growing his own beanstalk just outside Castle Big. Neither he nor Boris realise there is a small population of tiny people who sneak into Castle Big by climbing the beanstalk and going through a window, taking food off the Knights' table mistaking it for treasure. After Sir Doris destroys the tiny people's village, they decide to cut the beanstalk down believing it is the source of their misfortune.
7	"The Village Games"	BBC Two	23 December 1999
The villagers of Village Börödzo put in place a cunning but risky plan to keep Sir Boris and Sir Morris away from their annual village sports day. Sir Boris decides to play a game of fetch with Sir Horace, his dog. While going to retrieve it, the Knights discover that Sir Doris is missing, using Sir Horace's smell to locate her. They arrive at a small house belonging to a witch, who disguises herself as an innocent granny. They accidentally destroy her house looking for Sir Doris. After finding her, they discover the granny's true identity and decide to play a game of 'throw the old witch'. As the name implies, Sir Boris picks the witch up and throws her an incredible distance, as she lands unfortunately in Village Börödzo, causing carnage to the townspeople. At the end of the episode, Sir Morris wins the prized Börödzo Cup for the first and last time.
8	"Alchemy"	BBC Two	25 December 1999
Sir Boris and Sir Morris, hidden from view by their wondrous 'Hats of Invisibility', infiltrate the Court of King Otto's fabulously wealthy rival, Queen Melissa and attempt to "borrow" her spell for turning base metal into gold. However, Queen Melissa and her subjects are made aware of the infiltration beforehand and recite a fake spell to trick the Knights' and King Otto. The spell, which Zabobon recites, creates a hideous, large monster made from scrap metal, which the knights help to take out. Zabobon recites another spell, which transforms the metal not into gold, but into cheese.
9	"Lost Doris"	BBC Two	28 December 1999
Sir Morris is cast into a deep depression when Sir Doris escapes from her cage. Sir Boris proposes every amusement he can think of to cheer him up, but in vain. So The Big Knights ride out to find Sir Doris. All they need do is follow the trail of destruction left by Sir Doris as she eats her way through the Borovian countryside. No-one is more surprised than Sir Morris to discover where Sir Doris has gone to, as she is eaten by a dragon. Sir Morris gets eaten and goes inside the dragon to rescue her.
10	"Clockwork Knights"	BBC Two	28 December 1999
Due to an error in the Royal Accounts, Village Börödzo acquires a wondrous new clock that King Otto spends a ridiculous amount of money on.
11	"The Troll Bridge"	BBC Two	29 December 1999
King Otto takes the court out for a Sunday afternoon drive and unexpectedly encounters a strange little troll barring the way across an insignificant bridge. When none of his courtiers can deal with the upstart, the King summons the Big Knights to deal with the troll.
12	"Proton Power"	BBC Two	31 December 1999
Against the advice of his own scientists, King Otto invests in Professor von Proton's new power source for Borovia. Proton Power is cheap, but it is also dirty, smelly, highly unstable and comes with the potential for mass destruction. A perfect case for The Big Knights to get stuck into.
13	"The Royal Escort"	BBC Two	3 January 2000
When King Otto's fearsome sisters Lily and lris send word they wish to entertain their nieces Lucy and Loretta, Sir Boris and Sir Morris volunteer to escort the princesses to their aunts' distant castle.

== Remastered version ==
In 2009, Neville Astley and Mark Baker purchased back the rights to the show from BBC Worldwide. The original series aired on TV with a standard Academy 1:1.33 aspect ratio, the BBC's delivery requirement at the time. With this purchase however, the series was remastered in 16:9 high definition using the original project files and released in its entirety for the first time in 2010 by Entertainment One as a combined DVD (region 2) and Blu-ray (region B) under the title of The Big Knights: Run For Your Lives!.

In 2015, a theatrical compilation film version was released, which was edited from seven remastered episodes.

In 2020, all 13 episodes were remastered again and uploaded onto YouTube in June 2020.

== Home video releases ==
In 2000, 6 episodes were released on VHS (PAL) by BBC Video as The Big Knights: The Big Adventures. "Imagine a cartoon cross between Monty Python and the Holy Grail and Blackadder," suggested OK! in a review of the VHS, "and you're halfway there. Fun for all the family!"

== Awards ==
- 2000 Best Adult Animation Series – British Animation Awards (BAA)
- 2000 Best Use of New Technology – British Animation Awards (BAA)
- 2001 Best Animation Series – Annecy International Animated Film Festival
- 2001 Grand Prize for Animated Television Programme at the SICAF International Festival in Korea
- 2001 Best Commercial Series Animation Award – FAN International Festival of Animation UK
