= Ben & Holly's Little Kingdom =

British children's animated television series

- Genre: Fantasy
- Created by: Mark Baker; Neville Astley
- Written by: Neville Astley; Mark Baker; Sam Morrison; Gary Parker; Philip Hall
- Directed by: Mark Baker; Neville Astley; Philip Hall; Joris van Hulzen; Andrea Tran
- Voices of: Preston Nyman; Taylor Sian; Ian Puleston-Davies; Sara Crowe; Sarah Ann Kennedy; John Sparkes; Judy Flynn; David Graham
- Narrated by: David Graham (Intro)
- Theme music composer: Julian Nott
- Opening theme: Ben & Holly's Little Kingdom opening theme "Dwarf" composed by (James Butler; Christian Chessell (for Christian Chessel); Gideon Rigal; Will Rose; Tomas Gisby
- Composer: Julian Nott
- Country of origin: United Kingdom
- Original language: English
- No. of series: 2
- No. of episodes: 100 (list of episodes)

Production
- Executive producers: Debbie Macdonald (2009–2011); Joan Lofts (2009–2011); Laura Clunie (2009–2013); Layla Lewis (2009–2011); Olivier Dumont (2012–2013)
- Producer: Phil Davies
- Editors: Taig McNab; Zoe Luff; Tomas Gisby; Eddie Green
- Running time: 11 minutes: 22 minutes (specials)
- Production companies: Astley Baker Davies (Note: As The Elf Factory); Entertainment One Family (Note: Known as Rubber Duck Entertainment and E1 Kids for the first series)

Original release
- Network: Milkshake! Nick Jr.
- Release: 6 April 2009 – 24 December 2013

Related
- Peppa Pig

Ben & Holly's Little Kingdom is a British preschool children's animated television series. The show was created by Neville Astley and Mark Baker, and produced by Astley Baker Davies and by Entertainment One UK (the original companies responsible for Peppa Pig). Many of the voice actors who worked on Peppa Pig have lent their voices to the show; these include John Sparkes, Sarah Ann Kennedy, David Rintoul and David Graham. The music is composed, conducted, and produced by Julian Nott, who is noted for his Wallace and Gromit, Bing and Peppa Pig scores. Ben & Holly's Little Kingdom is the third show to be produced by Astley Baker Davies.

== Overview ==
The show is set in the Little Kingdom, which is a miniature kingdom hidden among bushes. It is ruled by two fairies, King and Queen Thistle. They live in the Little Castle with their three daughters: Princess Holly and the naughty younger twins Daisy and Poppy. Nanny Plum is the fairies' nanny and housekeeper, known for her sarcastic comments and overall uninterested mood. Elves, including Ben Elf, live in the Great Elf Tree, which acts as a school, library, apartment complex and factory all in one. Elves are more traditional and live like humans, not using magic, while fairies are modern and magic-oriented. Despite this, the Elf Factory is run on magic.

The Wise Old Elf (also known as Cedric Elf) is the head elf. He operates the Elf Rescue, Elf Farm and Elf Windmill, among many others. Elves have their catchphrase, "...and I'm an elf" (occasionally "we're elves"), tooting their horn afterwards, however, they sometimes just blow a raspberry, such as in "The Elf Factory" when an Elf Worker forgets her horn. Fairies have a matching catchphrase, "I'm a fairy" (occasionally "we're fairies"), followed by a wave and sparkle of their wands. Ben and Holly also have a coccinellid ladybird pet named Gaston, who acts like a dog and is their best friend.

== Episodes ==
Series	Episodes	Originally released	
Series	Episodes	First released	Last released
1	50	6 April 2009	7 February 2011
2	50	2 July 2012	24 December 2013

== Characters ==
=== Major ===
- Ben Elf (voiced by Preston Nyman) is an elf and one of the titular protagonists alongside his best friend, Princess Holly. He lives with his parents, Mr and Mrs Elf, in a tree (known as the Great Elf Tree) along with all the other elves. He can be quite tentative about using magic, as he is a young elf and elves generally dislike using it. He is an only child but has plenty of friends; his best friend is Princess Holly. People often mistake him for the Wise Old Elf's grandson. He is good at fixing and repairing things. His catchphrase is "Elves are good at [X], and I'm an elf!" which always finishes with him blowing his horn.
- Princess Holly Thistle (more commonly known as Princess Holly, Holly Thistle or Holly) (voiced by Sian Taylor) is a fairy, and one of the titular protagonists alongside her best friend, Ben Elf. She is a cheerful, tidy, clever, and tiny princess who lives in the Little Castle with her parents, King and Queen Thistle, her younger twin sisters, Daisy and Poppy and the royal family's nanny, Nanny Plum. She likes to use magic despite the risk of things going wrong, a reference to the great curiosity in young children. She likes playing with her best friend, Ben Elf and the other elves and fairies.
- King Thistle (voiced by Ian Puleston-Davies) is the King of the Little Kingdom and the husband of Queen Thistle. He is also Princess Holly, Daisy, and Poppy's father. He is often bossy and obnoxious though he can be quite a gentle, kind and loving father. He dislikes celebrating his birthday because it reminds him he is getting older.
- Queen Thistle (voiced by Sara Crowe) is the Queen consort of the Little Kingdom and the wife of King Thistle. She is also Princess Holly, Daisy, and Poppy's mother. She is good at baking cakes. She is possibly the only person who can handle looking after Daisy and Poppy, though at times even she can be overwhelmed by the trouble they cause with their magic. She is Queen Marigold's younger sister.
- Daisy and Poppy (both voiced by Zoe Baker) are Holly's younger twin sisters. They are not very good at magic and don't know that many spells as they are only toddlers, but this does not stop them from trying to cause chaos with the dangerous spells they do know. They are quite cheeky and usually end up causing trouble with magic. As Daisy and Poppy can be very naughty, Holly sometimes dislikes her sisters due to the trouble they cause with their magic. Most of the adult characters are wary of them too, though Queen Thistle seems to be able to deal with them for the most part. They share the same voice actress as Richard Rabbit from Peppa Pig.
- Nanny Plum (voiced by Sarah Ann Kennedy) is Holly, Daisy, and Poppy's nanny, and a general housekeeper for the King and Queen Thistle. She is very good at magic and capable of speaking many animal languages (including ones which she claims to be a bit difficult such as Mole, Aardvark, Ant, Centipede and even Alien). She often ends up in all kinds of trouble when trying to help Holly and her friends. She is also a tooth fairy. Although being quite bossy and mean, she usually is a helpful and funny character. She is very good at cleaning with magic. She rivals the Wise Old Elf mainly due to their differing opinions over the use of magic. She is a teacher at the Fairy School. She shares the same voice actress as Miss Rabbit and Mummy Rabbit from Peppa Pig.
- Cedric Elf (more commonly known as The Wise Old Elf) (voiced by David Graham) lives near the top of the Great Elf Tree. Since he is the series' "Jack of all trades, master of none", he also is the Wise Old Tailor, Wise Old Plumber, the elf doctor and the librarian. He also runs the Elf School and the Elf Factory. He rivals Nanny Plum and strongly disapproves of the use of magic, but used to admire magic and enjoyed himself when he was briefly given the ability to use magic. He strongly believes that kicking things that don't work will fix them, as demonstrated in multiple episodes. He is sometimes mistaken as Ben Elf's grandfather. He has three kids, two of which are pirates, Redbeard the Elf Pirate and Captain Squid, and an elf son who dreamed of becoming a Viking, as shown in the episode 'Father's Day'. The Wise Old Elf's real name is Cedric, as Granny and Grandpapa Thistle address him. He has a twin brother, an Arctic Elf named "The Wiser Older Elf". A running gag is that Elf Rescue, run by the Wise Old Elf, is a parody of International Rescue in the 1960s television series Thunderbirds, with comparable rocket-powered rescue vehicles and similar strident accompanying music. David Graham, who voiced the Wise Old Elf, also voiced Aloysius Parker the chauffeur in Thunderbirds, and is the same voice actor acting as Grandpa Pig from Peppa Pig until 2024 (posthumously until 2027).
- Mr Elf (voiced by John Sparkes) is Ben Elf's father and Mrs Elf's husband. He is very serious and often likes hard work. He is the food deliverer to the fairies and elves and delivers presents to Father Christmas. He once was a sailor and he quite enjoyed being one until a fish known as "Big Bad Barry", ate most of his boats after that experience he decided he would not sail again. He retired and instead worked to deliver food to the people of the Little Kingdom.
- Mrs Elf (voiced by Judy Flynn) is Ben Elf's mother and Mr Elf's wife. She is a very caring, kind and cheerful female adult elf who enjoys taking holidays (although it was her desire thanks to Mr Elf's hardworking attitude which probably kept them from doing so). Mrs Elf is like a typical housewife, helping out with her family's chores. Mrs Elf also helps the family out by making food.
- Gaston (vocal effects by Taig McNab) is a male ladybird who lives in a small cave. He likes his house to be messy as well as food that is "smelly and foul". He does not mind giving Ben rides when Ben needs to fly. Nanny Plum, who understands Ladybird language translates for him quite often. He acts quite similarly to a dog, making a barking sound when he "speaks", and also fetching sticks. Gaston has a brother, Tony, a sister-in-law, Pam, two nieces, Amber and Emerald, and a nephew, Keith. Gaston is also credited as Editor. Gaston also has a production company named after him.

=== Minor ===
- Lucy Big (voiced by Abigail Daniels) is a kind-hearted 8-year-old girl who lives with her parents in the Big (normal) World. Lucy, along with her mum (Mrs Big), her dad (Mr Big) and her teacher, Miss Cookie are the only big people who know about the Little Kingdom.
- Miss Jolly (voiced by Kate Robbins) is a snail riding teacher and a pet trainer. She also has a snail called Trigger.
- Trigger is Miss Jolly's pet snail.
- Redbeard the Elf Pirate (Nigel) (voiced by David Rintoul) is the pirate uncle of Barnaby Elf and also the son of the Wise Old Elf. He is introduced in series 1, episode 31, where it is also revealed that his real name is Nigel. He sails the oceans in a pirate ship named Pedro, though his size prevents him from engaging in acts of actual piracy, and he is more of a treasure hunter and explorer. He is quite smitten with Nanny Plum whom he considers his sweetheart, however, Nanny Plum seems to have little interest in him romantically but deep down, Nanny Plum loves him back. He has a pet parrot, Polly, although she is normal-sized and barely fits inside Redbeard's ship. He is the same voice actor acting as Granddad Dog on Peppa Pig.
- Mrs Fig (voiced by Morwenna Banks) is the Scottish-accented teacher of Mrs Fig's Magic School. Nanny Plum used to go there and Holly and her friends went there when they were old enough. Despite being a fairy, she detests magic and says the most important rules of magic are "Don't use magic" and "Magic should only be used for serious things". As a result, the Wise Old Elf likes her as they have similar views on magic. Mrs Fig loathes Nanny Plum, who is implied to have been her worst student as she does not adhere to Mrs Fig's ideas on magic. Morwenna is the same voice actor acting as Mummy Pig and Madame Gazelle on Peppa Pig.
- Mrs Fotheringill (voiced by Morwenna Banks) is Daisy and Poppy's playgroup teacher. She was at one point sent back in time to the age of the dinosaurs by the children from her playgroup. She seems to be American due to her accent and when she calls Gaston a "ladybug" (the American term for ladybird) as well as mistaking his gender. She is presumably an elf, although her ears are hidden under her bob, and she has never been seen blowing her horn.
- Mr Gnome (voiced by David Graham) is a gnome that often wanders around the Little Kingdom ever since Nanny Plum magicked him into the Little Kingdom to guard the golf course from moles. He later occurred to be a lazy, slightly talkative, and gluttonous annoyance to the entire kingdom. After his debut appearance, whenever characters find him, they scream in horror, "Ah! The Gnome!" accompanied by either a timpani or bass drum soundtrack representing the characters' fear.
- Gloria Gnome (voiced by Judy Flynn) is Mr Gnome's "girlfriend". She was introduced in the episode, "Springtime".
- King and Queen Marigold (voiced by John Sparkes and Morwenna Banks) are the king and queen of a kingdom far from the Little Kingdom. They are often described as "snooty" characters who likely mock the Thistle family's misfortunes, such as judging the Little Castle by calling it a "shady-old" castle. But when the Thistle family's plans tarnish and most of the castle is demolished, the Marigolds unexpectedly find the castle's remnants "modern" and "daring" instead of teasing them as Queen Thistle predicted. The Marigolds are a cheerful, happy-go-lucky and slightly a snooty satire of high-brow trends in modern art and fashion. Queen Marigold is Queen Thistle's older sister, technically making the Marigolds part of the Thistle family and the uncle and aunt of Holly, Daisy, and Poppy. Their castle appears to be based on Saint Basil's Cathedral in Moscow.
- "Granny" Millicent Thistle is King Thistle's mother and Victor's wife. She often believes in using strong and dangerous magic and becomes a bad influence on Daisy and Poppy when she teaches them how to do it and giving them the wands of their great-grandparents (much to her son and daughter-in-law's chagrin), henceforth referencing how some grandparents spoil their grandchildren. She revealed that The Wise Old Elf used to love magic, right before the Monkey's Kittens incident. She lives with Victor in a castle high in the clouds.
- "Grandpapa" Victor Thistle (voiced by Alexander Armstrong) is King Thistle's father and Milicent's husband. He is "extremely bonkers" and along with his wife, also believes in using wacky and dangerous magic. He, Milicent, and the Wise Old Elf (who they refer to by his real name, Cedric), attended the same college, and like Milicent, even spoiled Daisy and Poppy in his last appearance in the episode "Journey to the Centre of the Earth" by taking them on a trip to a volcano.
- Mrs Witch is a witch who lives in a small cottage in the Little Kingdom. Although one time Holly wanted to know if she was evil, she apparently appears a nice witch who only gets angry or inflicts curses (like turning Nanny Plum into stone) when insulted (mainly as a retaliation or comeuppance), especially as she's touchy about her private cat, Moggy.
- Captain Squid (voiced by Andy Hamilton) is also a pirate, along with Redbeard the Elf Pirate. He is Redbeard's brother and also the Wise Old Elf's son.
- Barnaby Elf (voiced by Stanley Nickless) is a cheerful, loud, talkative, and giggly friend of Ben and Holly. He is Redbeard the Elf Pirate's nephew and also the Wise Old Elf's grandson. He has the same voice actor as Pedro Pony from Peppa Pig.
- Strawberry (voiced by Zara Siddiqi) is a fairy who is friends with Holly and often attends lessons with her. She is very cheerful, happy-go-lucky, bubbly, and silly, and has her red hair styled in a small tulip bun. Her mother is the vet of the Little Kingdom.
- Violet (voiced by Julia Lucy Moss) is one of Holly’s friends. She has pink hair styled into pigtails.
- Fleur (voiced by Alice May) is a calm, quiet, and shy friend of Holly and attends school with the other fairy children (most of them were female for an unspecified reason). She sometimes got turned into a cat by Daisy and Poppy and when she played a game where she was the antagonist, Holly was the "damsel in distress/victim", and Ben was the hero by being a "knight in shining armour", she forgot to magic away the tower and her witch's outfit when her mum called her for dinner.
- The Fairy Mayor (voiced by Alexander Armstrong) is a character based on Boris Johnson, the former mayor of London and former prime minister of the United Kingdom. He is Strawberry's dad. He does not like "big people" because they always step on fairies and elves.
- Zyros (voiced by Bram Karek) is an alien that lives on Planet Bong. He gets offended when he is called a baby, he likes magic jelly and he has a fear of big people. According to him, he and the other aliens get smaller as they get older.
- Ben's Robot (voiced by either Richard Ridings or David Graham) is a robot that Gaston found broken in the middle of the meadow with no key.

Character	Voice actor
Ben Elf	Preston Nyman
Holly Thistle	Sian Taylor
Lucy Big	Abigail Daniels
King Thistle	Ian Puleston-Davies
Queen Thistle	Sara Crowe
Daisy and Poppy	Zoë Baker
Nanny Plum	Sarah Ann Kennedy
Cedric / Wise Old Elf	David Graham
Gaston the Ladybird	Taig McNab
Miss Jolly	Kate Robbins
Nigel / Redbeard the Elf Pirate	David Rintoul
Mr Big	Alexander Armstrong
Mrs Big	Sara Crowe
Mrs Fig	Morwenna Banks
Mrs Fotheringill	Morwenna Banks
Mr Elf	John Sparkes
Mrs Elf	Judy Flynn
Mr Gnome	David Graham
Gloria Gnome	Judy Flynn
King Marigold	John Sparkes
Queen Marigold	Morwenna Banks
Milicent / Granny Thistle	Morwenna Banks
Victor / Granpapa Thistle	Alexander Armstrong
Mrs Witch	Sara Crowe
Strawberry	Zara Siddiqi
Fairy Mayor	Alexander Armstrong
Fleur	Alice May
Zyros	Bram Karek
Captain Squid	Andy Hamilton
Barnaby Elf	Stanley Nickless
Jake Elf	Jonny Butler
Rosie Fairy	Chaniya Mahon
Violet	Julia Lucy Moss
Lizzy Elf	Cecily Bloom
Tarquin	Jonny Butler
Miss Cookie	Naomi Wilkinson
Big Bad Barry	Richard Ridings
Father Christmas	Richard Ridings
Dave the Dragon	Eddie Green
Dwarf Boss	Richard Ridings
The Great Alien Leader	Stanley Eville
Magic Mirror	Morwenna Banks
Genie	Richard Ridings
Strawberry's Mum	Naomi Wilkinson
Ben's Robot	David Graham or Richard Ridings

== Broadcast ==
In the United Kingdom and Ireland the show was broadcast on Channel 5 children’s programming block, Milkshake! and on Nick Jr. UK and Ireland. In Canada, the show was broadcast on Treehouse TV. In the United States, the show was broadcast on the Nick Jr. Channel. The series also airs on Baraem in Qatar. On 1 June 2021, the entire show became available on Tubi. It was broadcast across Nickelodeon's channels throughout Africa, Asia-Pacific, Europe, the Middle East, Latin America and North America.

== Reception ==
Common Sense Media gave the show 4/5, calling it "charming" and saying it promoted friendship and perseverance. The Toy Insider also gave the show a positive review, saying it was entertaining and also taught positive values.
