= Tractor Tom =

British animated television series

- Genre: Educational; Animation
- Written by: Mark Holloway (Series 1); Chris Trengove (Series 1); Andrew Brenner (Series 2)
- Directed by: Jerry Hibbert
- Starring: Liza Tarbuck; James Nesbitt; Enn Reitel; Victoria Shalet; Liam Ross-Mills; Luke Sackville; Tom Swetland; Jack Leach; Amber Amayo
- Narrated by: Enn Reitel
- Composer: Mark Sayer-Wade
- Country of origin: United Kingdom
- Original language: English
- No. of series: 2
- No. of episodes: 52

Production
- Executive producers: Richard Bridgwood; Joan Lofts
- Producers: Charlotte Loynes (Series 1); Lesley Sawl (Some Series 1 episodes and all of Series 2)
- Running time: 11 minutes
- Production companies: Contender Entertainment Group; HRTV

Original release
- Network: ITV (CITV)
- Release: 9 February 2003 – 18 November 2004

Tractor Tom is a British animated children's television series, produced by the Contender Entertainment Group and Hibbert Ralph Entertainment. Two series were produced, consisting of 26 eleven-minute episodes each, which was aired between 9 February 2003 and 18 November 2004 respectively. It was the first programme produced by home media distributor Contender, who later went on to produce Peppa Pig.

The show originally aired on CITV in the UK, and also aired in other countries like New Zealand and Australia and in Canada, where it played on Kids' CBC.

== Background ==
Set on the idyllic Springhill Farm, brave and resourceful Tractor Tom and his human, animal, and vehicle friends have fun and adventures at both work and play.

The first series featured Liza Tarbuck and James Nesbitt as Farmer Fi and Matt respectively, with Enn Reitel as the narrator. When compared to similar shows at the time, the vehicles did not speak in any form and only communicated through their respective sounds (chugging for Tom, revving for Buzz, Rev, and Rory, and spluttering and wheezing for Wheezy; excluding the French dub) despite having mouths.

The major change for Series 2 was that the vehicles now spoke out loud through a cast of child voice actors, and had minor redesigns to add moving mouth parts. Fi and Matt would also gain new voice actors and outfits, and new characters were introduced. Enn Reitel remained as the show's narrator. CITV re-airings of the first series were eventually edited to include the new voice cast although the animation remained the same (Meaning the mouths did not move when the characters spoke) and the credits were not edited for the changes.

Sales from DVDs of series one contributed to the Great Ormand Street Hospital Children's Charity (although this is stated on the DVD covers the reference has been removed from the official site), as "Tractor Tom, what would we do without you" was the slogan for the series.

== Characters ==
=== Vehicles ===
- Tom is a cheerful bright red tractor who is optimistic and always tries to solve his friends' problems. He is also afraid of the dark sometimes. Tom always knows the safety rules and can get a bit angry when somebody disobeys orders. He seems to be the arguably closest friend of Buzz. He likes helping him out.
- Buzz is a young and inquisitive blue and yellow quadbike who is sometimes said to be "too small". He also liked to get into trouble with Snicker the foal in the first series, and arguably Tom's closest friend. In the second series, he is now a well behaved boy and likes helping Tom out.
- Wheezy is the farm's slow, old, and large yellow combine harvester who enjoys telling stories in the first series and likes to stay in the barn, which is the "home" of most of the vehicles. In "Two Harvesters", he was told by Rev that he was challenging Roly. Also, he sometimes doesn't like going out of the barn in the second series. In "The Quiet Place", his first quiet place got a bit distracted, until with the help of Tom, he had a new one.
- Rev is a large purple pickup truck belonging to Matt the farmhand that often boasts and his least favourite thing is coming second or last in a race. Though he isn't a villain-like character, he is sometimes disagreeable. He is Tom's best friend and seems to tell Wheezy to challenge Roly to a race in a field in "Two Harvesters". Also, he hates getting dirty or carrying dirty stuff (only when he said that in "Come Back Dusty" when he was carrying manure for Mr. Aziz's roses).
- Rora was introduced at the beginning of the second series as a white and hot pink-coloured motorbike and replaced Buzz as Farmer Fi's on-road vehicle. An energetic character who is good friends with Dusty and has a friendly rivalry with Rev. When she isn't driving Fi around, she always likes teasing Rev. She can get a bit bossy. She is never sleepy (only in "A Song for the Farm", all because of Dusty's sleep-talking and Matt's snoring).
- Dusty was introduced early in the second series as a yellow and orange aeroplane and is energetic and friendly. She seems to be good friends with Rora. In "A Song for the Farm", she talks in her sleep, which causes Rora to wake up and not get enough sleep. She hates having baths in "Come Back Dusty", because she will get soap in her eyes. She seems to do the loop-the-loops.

=== Humans ===
- Farmer Fi (voiced by Liza Tarbuck in the first series) is the sole farmer of Springhill Farm, who wears a pink shirt and hat, blue trousers with a yellow flower at the bottom and has blond hair. In the second series she wears blue overalls. She only needs one employee, Matt, because she owns a very small farm.
- Farmerhand Matt (voiced by James Nesbitt in the first series) lives in a small silver caravan down the road from the farm, and often helps with the work on the farm. He is rather forgetful and mentally clumsy, especially in the second series. He owns Rev the truck and drives in him everywhere.

=== Animals ===
- There are three brown hens on Springhill Farm.
- Wack is one of the two ducks on the farm. He wears an orange collar. In "Wild Ducks", he didn't want to say hello to the wild ducks at first.
- Bach is the other duck which wears a blue collar. He, just like Wack, seems to not make friends with the wild ducks at first in "Wild Ducks".
- Riff is the farm's sheepdog who likes to associate with the other animals, and likes rounding them up like the sheep. In "The Big Picnic", she seems to want Fi's pie.
- Purdey is Farmer Fi's pet cat who is rather lazy and is a friend of Wheezy's.
- Mo is the only cow on the farm and hence sometimes gets lonely but otherwise an ordinary cow character.
- Winnie is a horse who tends to not be very excited, except when it comes to carrots.
- Snicker is Winnie's foal who likes to get into mischief with Buzz and his favourite food is sugar cubes, but also, like Winnie, loves carrots. Notably one of the few male animals on the farm.
- There are eight sheep who like to use strange non-animal objects such as helter-skelters, central heating systems, and baths. They also love to get into mischief and go into Matt's caravan when unwanted.

=== Mentioned or guests ===
- Farmer Allsop runs the neighbouring farm to Farmer Fi's. He is mentioned many times, but made no appearances.
- Roly - Farmer Fi has borrowed Farmer Allsop's harvester twice when Wheezy wasn't available. He looks exactly like Wheezy but is blue and is much faster. In his first appearance in "Where's Wheezy?", he only appeared as a non-speaking, unnamed character harvesting the wheat, but his name was revealed to be Roly in his second appearance in "Two Harvesters", and was given a voice. He was a bully towards Wheezy at first and Rev challenged him and Wheezy to a race with Dusty commentating. He and Wheezy eventually became friends.
- Mr. Aziz only mentioned once by the narrator when Rev was carrying manure for his roses in "Come Back Dusty". He made no appearances.
- Rory - Identical to Rora, but only appeared in the last episode of the first season "Rodeo", when hired by Matt. He is orange.
- There are three wild ducks that appeared in "Wild Ducks", when they were migrating and stopped for a rest. The wild ducks were a trio of male Mallard Ducks.
- It is unknown if the rabbit that appeared in the first season to steal the animals' food is the same one that appeared in the second season, visiting Wheezy's "quiet place".
- Fi's parents - Fi's mother phoned her once, not making an appearance, worrying about Fi's father's sudden illness, which turned out to be not serious. As Fi said, it was "just my mum worrying. You know what she's like."
- Jerry runs the sports centre and talked to Matt on the phone once. He made no appearances.

== Episodes ==
=== Season 1 (2003) ===
No. overall	No. in season	Title	Written by	Original release date
1	1	"Ringtone"	Mark Holloway	2003
Matt loses his mobile and it's up to Tractor Tom to find it.
2	2	"Showtime Tom"	Mark Holloway	2003
Fi and Matt hold a show, where the ducks become the stars with their dancing!
3	3	"Apple Squash"	Chris Trengove	2003
Troubles are going alone in the farm involving a bored Wheezy, a fussy Purdey, and some apples.
4	4	"Baa Baa Tom Sheep"	Mark Holloway	2003
When Tom accidentally gets covered in flour, a lamb mistakes Tom for a sheep, and thinks he is the Mummy.
5	5	"Football Crazy"	Chris Trengove	2003
The vehicles end up playing football, wrecking the nicely-cleaned farm. Will Tom and the others be able to clean it up before Fi comes back?
6	6	"Clean Machine"	Chris Trengove	2003
Rev wants to finish his job before it rains.
7	7	"Fly Away Buzz"	Mark Holloway	2003
Buzz gets blown away into a tree on a windy day.
8	8	"Where's Wheezy?"	Chris Trengove	2003
When Wheezy gets ill and Fi borrows a replacement harvester, he begins to feel useless and runs away.
9	9	"Sports Day"	Chris Trengove	2003
Matt is unhappy when the Sports Day gets cancelled, but Tractor Tom decides to let him hold it at the farm instead.
10	10	"The Big Jump"	Mark Holloway	2003
Fi decides that Whinny needs exercise. Meanwhile, Matt is having trouble painting Fi's House.
11	11	"A Job for Buzz"	Mark Holloway	2003
Buzz gets a job.
12	12	"Treasure Trail"	Chris Trengove	2003
Tom and his friends discover treasure.
13	13	"A Carnival for Fi"	Chris Trengove	2003
Fi goes to a carnival.
14	14	"Musical Mayhem"	Chris Trengove	2003
When Winnie is sad, Tom knows just the thing to make her smile again.
15	15	"Mo's Low"	Mark Holloway	2003
16	16	"The New Scarecrow"	Mark Holloway	2003
Tom makes a new scarecrow.
17	17	"The Wheezy Files"	Chris Trengove	2003
Tom discovers some wheezy files.
18	18	"The Big Picnic"	Chris Trengove	2003
Tom and his friends get ready for a picnic.
19	19	"Show & Tell"	Mark Holloway	2003
Tom wants to play show & tell.
20	20	"Flower Power"	Chris Trengove	2003
Tom wants to grow a flower.
21	21	"Anyone for Tennis?"	Chris Trengove	2003
Tom wants to play a sports game.
22	22	"Haywire Hens"	Mark Holloway	2003
Tom sees some haywire hens.
23	23	"The Big Hole"	Mark Holloway	2003
Tom discovers a big hole.
24	24	"A Surprise for Fi"	Mark Holloway	2003
When Fi and Tom can't go to the carnival, Matt decides that the carnival will come to them.
25	25	"Tom's Busy Day"	Chris Trengove	2003
Tom has a busy day.
26	26	"Rodeo"	Chris Trengove	11 August 2003
Matt dreams of being a cowboy and Tom finds a way to bring the wild west to Springhill.

=== Season 2 (2004) ===
No. overall	No. in season	Title	Written by	Original release date
27	1	"Buzz Helps Out"	Andrew Brenner	
28	2	"The New Football"	Andrew Brenner	
29	3	"Hide and Seek"	Andrew Brenner	
30	4	"Out of Reach"	Andrew Brenner	
31	5	"All for a Wash"	Andrew Brenner	
32	6	"Trailer Trouble"	Andrew Brenner	
33	7	"Trail of Tricks"	Andrew Brenner	
34	8	"The New Vehicle"	Andrew Brenner	
35	9	"Buzz to the Rescue"	Andrew Brenner	
36	10	"Rora’s Monster"	Andrew Brenner	
37	11	"Puppy Problems"	Andrew Brenner	
38	12	"The Quiet Place"	Andrew Brenner	
39	13	"Come Back Dusty"	Andrew Brenner	
40	14	"The Great Sheep Race"	Andrew Brenner	
41	15	"Matt’s in Charge"	Andrew Brenner	
42	16	"The Farm Parade"	Andrew Brenner	
43	17	"Rora and the Rain"	Andrew Brenner	
44	18	"Wheezy Wings"	Andrew Brenner	
45	19	"Rev the Hero"	Andrew Brenner	
46	20	"The Big Adventure"	Andrew Brenner	
47	21	"A Song for the Farm"	Andrew Brenner	
48	22	"Two Harvesters"	Andrew Brenner	
49	23	"Carrot Dance"	Andrew Brenner	
50	24	"Tom Hatches an Egg"	Andrew Brenner	
51	25	"Cool for Trucks"	Andrew Brenner	
52	26	"Wild Ducks"	Andrew Brenner	

=== Rerun airings ===
- ABC Kids (Australia)
