= Entertainment One UK =

British entertainment company

Entertainment One UK Limited
- Logo used since 2015, the logo still used after eOne current Canadian entertainment company rebranded to Lionsgate Canada
- Trade name: eOne UK
- Formerly: Contender Limited (1994–2009); E1 Entertainment UK Limited (2009–10)
- Type: Subsidiary
- Industry: Entertainment
- Predecessors: Medusa Communications & Marketing; Momentum Pictures
- Founded: 14 November 1994; 32 years ago
- Founder: Richard Bridgewood
- Headquarters: 45 Mortimer Street, London, England, United Kingdom
- Area served: United Kingdom
- Products: Television
- Parent: Lionsgate Canada (2007–present)
- Website: www.entertainmentone.co.uk

Entertainment One UK Limited, trading as eOne UK (formerly Contender Limited and E1 Entertainment UK Limited), is a British entertainment company and a subsidiary of Lionsgate Canada. The company was formed as the Contender Entertainment Group in 1994, initially functioning as a home video distributor before expanding to produce television shows and theatrical films before being acquired by the Canadian-based Entertainment One (now Lionsgate Canada) in 2007.

Since 2023, the company has exited the physical media and theatrical markets, with only its unscripted television branch operating.

== History ==
Contender Entertainment Group logo used from 2000–2006.

Contender Entertainment Group logo used from 2005–2009.

The company was formed in 1994 by former HIT Entertainment employee Richard Bridgewood. The company was initially formed as a home video distributor, mainly handling the distribution of children's properties onto VHS.

During the late-1990s to early-2000s, Contender operated under five sub-labels: Kult TV, Kult Kidz, Nippers, Bonkers, and Golden Times. Popular shows within these labels included the cult-classic Farscape from The Jim Henson Company, to anime properties such as Medabots and Beyblade from Nelvana.

2002 and 2003 saw Contender enter the children's television market with its first television production, Tractor Tom. The series, which featured the voices of Liza Tarbuck and James Nesbitt was pre-sold to ITV and became a successful programme in its CITV programming strand. In the same year, the company expanded to the physical print market with Contender Books.

The success of Tractor Tom led to Contender greenlighting a second pre-school property, Peppa Pig, from indie studio Astley Baker Davies in February 2003, with a pre-sale to Five and Nick Jr. occurring at the same time. The company greenlit a third pre-school property, Mojo Swoptops, in February 2004. However, it would not see the light of day due to its concept being similar to another show that was in development at the same time, Roary the Racing Car, and would not officially be produced until 2024.

In February 2004, Contender purchased rival distributor Medusa Communications and Marketing for £20 million. The purchase allowed Contender to expand its investments in the UK media industry. Medusa's founders David Hodgins and Stephen Rivers would become directors at Contender. Medusa's 2 sub-labels (Hong Kong Legends and Premier Asia) would also remain as is At the end of May 2004, Peppa Pig would premiere in the United Kingdom on Five's Milkshake! strand. The series would become an immense success, with its first DVD release selling over 100,000 units by the end of October 2005 alongside a successful toyline by Character Options. At the end of 2005, the series would be picked up in over 120 territories, including the United States under a broadcast deal with Cartoon Network, secured in November 2004.

On 7 July 2005, the company announced that it would split its operations into two stand-alone subsidiaries, with the Home Entertainment division becoming Contender Home Entertainment, and the television division becoming Rubber Duck Entertainment. The split was done in favour of the success of Peppa Pig, of which Rubber Duck would greenlight new pre-school properties for Contender to distribute and market. On the same day, Rubber Duck announced they had greenlit another pre-school property named Humf. In October 2005, Five and Nick Jr. recommissioned Peppa Pig for a second series.

On 14 June 2007, the Canadian-based Entertainment One Income Fund announced it would purchase Contender for $97 million. The same year, Entertainment One would secure a film output agreement with Summit Entertainment, of which Contender Films would release their output in the UK.

In March 2008, Contender secured worldwide distribution rights outside of the US and Canada to the PBS Kids series It's a Big Big World. In December 2008, the company announced that Channel 4 had secured broadcast rights to Lost & Found, a short-film produced by Studio AKA based on Oliver Jeffers' children's book of the same name. The special aired during Christmas Eve of that year.

On 22 January 2009, EOIF announced that it would rebrand all its operations as E1 Entertainment. Contender Entertainment Group's operations, including Contender Home Entertainment, Contender Films and Contender Merchandising, would be consolidated as E1 Entertainment UK, while Rubber Duck Entertainment would rebrand as E1 Kids with founder Richard Bridgwood remaining as marketing director. E1's next pre-school properties, Humf, a co-production with King Rollo Films, and Ben & Holly's Little Kingdom, their second co-production with Astley Baker Davies, would make their world premieres on Nick Jr. UK on 2 March and 6 April respectively, with the latter becoming another financial success for the division.

In June 2010, E1 UK announced that Richard Bridgewood had departed from the company.

On May 28, 2012, Entertainment One announced that they would purchase Alliance Films, which would be completed on January 9, 2013. Afterwards, Alliance Films' UK division, Momentum Pictures, was folded into Entertainment One UK.

On 30 September 2015, eOne acquired a 70% stake in British animation studio Astley Baker Davies, best known for producing the pre-school TV series Peppa Pig.

On 11 July 2019, eOne announced it would purchase unscripted factual studio Daisybeck Studios. In November 2020, the company was renamed as Entertainment One Unscripted Television UK, although Daisybeck continues to trade as a division.

=== Closure of theatrical division, split of children's division (2023–present) ===
In July 2023, Hasbro announced that the theatrical division of Entertainment One UK would cease operations, with the company blaming structural changes in the film industry following the impact of the COVID-19 pandemic and issues with the structure of independent distribution in the country for the reasons. The television and home media divisions would remain in operation for the time being.

Following the purchase of eOne by Lionsgate on 26 December 2023, eOne UK remained in operation and the company's children's assets remained with Hasbro. In January 2024, Entertainment One Unscripted Television UK, including Daisybeck Studios, was consolidated into the newly-formed Lionsgate Alternative Television; but would remain as subsidiaries.

eOne UK was included as part of the Lionsgate Studios split in mid-2024. The company's name remained as such even after its former parent company was renamed as Lionsgate Canada in June.

== Properties ==
=== Direct-to-video features ===
- 100 Favourite Nursery Rhymes & Songs (2000)
- 100 Favourite Fairy Tales and Stories (2001)
- How to be a Ballet Dancer (2002, co-production with Poquito Productions)
- A Trip To See Santa (2002, co-production with Poquito Productions)
- First Bible Stories (2002, co-production with Poquito Productions)
- 100 Favourite Toddler Tunes & Rhymes (2003, co-production with Poquito Productions)
- 100 Favourite Animal Stories & Rhymes (2004, co-production with Poquito Productions)
- 100 Favourite Bedtime Songs & Rhymes (2005, co-production with Poquito Productions)
- 100 Favourite Action Songs (2005, co-production with Poquito Productions)

=== Television shows and specials ===
Unless noted, all shows listed in this section are now owned by Hasbro Entertainment.

- Tractor Tom (2002–2004, co-production with HRTV)
- Peppa Pig (2004–present, Seasons 1–8, co-production with Astley Baker Davies)
- Humf (2009–2010, co-production with King Rollo Films)
- Lost & Found (2008, short film, co-production with Studio AKA)
- Ben & Holly's Little Kingdom (2009–2012, co-production with Astley Baker Davies)

=== Distribution only ===
- It's a Big Big World (2006–2010, outside US and Canada)
