= Mog (TV series) =

- Created by: Peter Tinniswood
- Starring: Enn Reitel; Abigail Cruttenden; Christopher Villiers; Catherine Schell; Tim Wylton; Alan Shearman; Malcom Fredrick; Toni Palmer
- Country of origin: United Kingdom
- Original language: English
- No. of series: 2
- No. of episodes: 13

Production
- Producer: WitzEnd for Central Independent Television
- Running time: 30 minutes (including adverts)

Original release
- Network: ITV
- Release: 26 May 1985 – 16 August 1986

Mog is a British television comedy broadcast from 26 May 1985 to 16 August 1986 about a cat burglar living in a psychiatric hospital. It stars Enn Reitel as the title character, who is only faking insanity. It is based on Peter Tinniswood's 1970 novel of the same name. It was made for the ITV network by WitzEnd for Central.
