= Crapston Villas =

- Genre: Sitcom; Animation; Black comedy Surreal humour Soap opera
- Created by: Sarah Ann Kennedy
- Written by: Sarah Ann Kennedy
- Directed by: Sarah Ann Kennedy
- Voices of: Morwenna Banks; Felix Dexter; Jane Horrocks; Claire Jennings; Polly Kemp; Alistair McGowan; Lesley Sharp; Alison Steadman; Steve Steen; John Thomson
- Country of origin: United Kingdom
- No. of episodes: 20 (over 2 series)

Production
- Executive producers: Joanna Beresford; Sarah Ann Kennedy
- Running time: 10 minutes per episode
- Production company: Spitting Image Productions

Original release
- Network: Channel 4
- Release: October 27, 1995 – January 19, 1998

Crapston Villas is a British adult animated television series, written, created and directed by Sarah Ann Kennedy, in which the characters were made from plasticine and filmed with stop motion clay animation. It was a comedy satire on inner-city London life, directed at a mature audience. It featured a set of characters, living in a grim apartment building in the fictional postcode of SE69, who were plagued by various dilemmas. Foul language, sex and violence are present.

== Production ==
It was made by the Spitting Image Productions company and was originally broadcast on the UK's Channel 4 from 1995 to 1998. It was written by Sarah Ann Kennedy, who was also director (series 1) along with Peter Boyd Maclean (series 2). The music for the show was composed by Rowland Lee.

Voices were provided by a range of British actors and comedians.

The show was cancelled after its second series by the incoming new head of Channel 4 Television, Michael Jackson, who then bought US import South Park to fill the late Friday night slot vacated by Crapston Villas.

The show would be one of the first animated series on British television to present openly gay characters, specifically Robbie and Larry.

== Plot ==
It is an animated series set in the world of Crapston Villa, where viewers follow the hilarious antics and everyday adventures of its residents.

== Availability ==
Each series comprised ten episodes. Series 1 was subsequently issued on video, edited together as a single 100 minute piece ("Crapston Villas – City of Slummington"), while Series 2 was similarly released, but on two videos ("Health Hazard" and "Culture Shock"). In the US, five episodes from Series 1 were released on DVD by the independent production/distribution company Troma Entertainment, but so far no DVD releases of either series have occurred in the UK.

As of January 2012, all 20 episodes of Crapston Villas are available to watch on Channel 4's digital on-demand service 4oD (now called Channel 4). Reruns of the Series are also available to watch on U&Gold late at night.

== Awards ==
- 1996 Broadcast Awards: Best New Program
