= Sarah Ann Kennedy =

British voice actress

- Occupations: Voice actress; writer; director
- Years active: 1995–present
- Notable work: Peppa Pig; Ben & Holly's Little Kingdom; Pond Life; Crapston Villas

Sarah Ann Kennedy is a British voice actress best known for providing the voices of Miss Rabbit and Mummy Rabbit in the children's animated series Peppa Pig, Nanny Plum in the children's animated series Ben & Holly's Little Kingdom and Dolly Pond in Pond Life. She also created, wrote and directed Crapston Villas, an animated soap opera for Channel 4. She has also written two episodes of Peppa Pig, and is currently a lecturer at the University of Lancashire.

== Voice roles ==
Year	Title	Role
1995-1998	Crapston Villas	Creator, writer, director
1996-2000	Pond Life	Dolly Pond
2004-present	Peppa Pig	Miss Rabbit/Mummy Rabbit, also writer of two episodes
2009-2013	Ben & Holly's Little Kingdom	Nanny Plum
