= The Village (animated short film) =

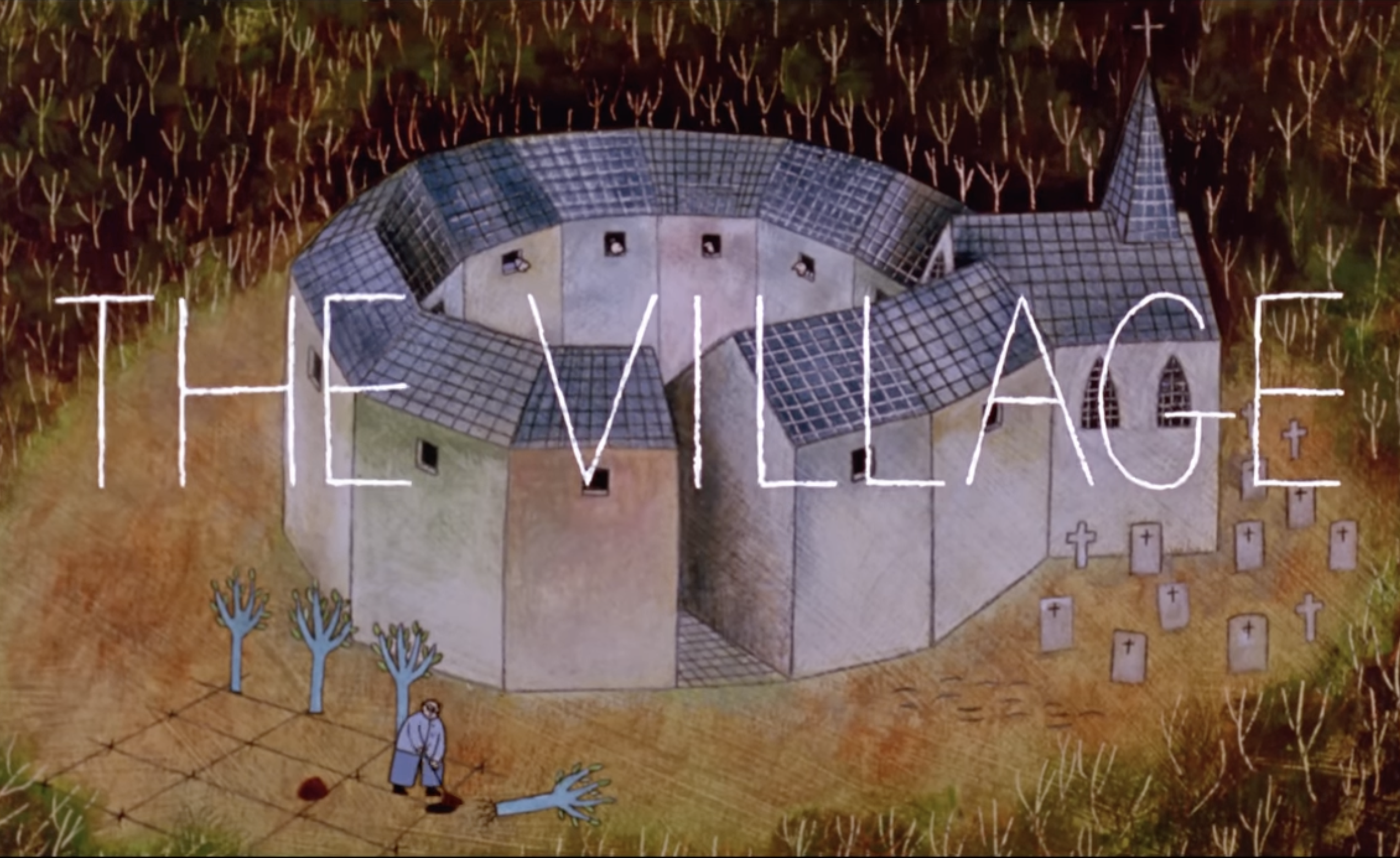
- The Village, 1993
- Directed by: Mark Baker
- Written by: Mark Baker
- Produced by: Pam Dennis
- Starring: Annie Griffin, Dave Western, James Baker
- Edited by: Annie Kocur
- Music by: Julian Nott
- Animation by: Christine Anders, Lynne Anderson, Neville Astley, Mark Baker, Sally Baxter, Sharon Boxall, Guy Brockett, Juliet Bunce, Christine Courtney, Caroline Cruikshank Martin Davey, Roxanne Ducharme, Alyson Hamilton, Lynne Holzer, Flora Keen, Sara Kent, Angela Kovacs, Chris Lambrou, Berni Leroy, Vanessa Luther-Smith, Gaston Marzio, Tom Newman, Isabel Radage, Paul Ray, Sandra Roach, Sharon Smith, Rachael Stedman, Paul Stone, Peter Western, Pete Wood, Julia Woolf, Rosemary Young
- Production company: Pizazz Pictures
- Distributed by: Pizazz Pictures
- Release date: May 1993
- Running time: 15 minutes
- Country: United Kingdom
- Language: English

The Village, is a 1993 Oscar-nominated British animated short film directed by Mark Baker. The short film was animated using traditional hand-drawn animation. The film, directed and written by Baker, and produced by Pam Dennis, takes place in the eponymous village where the majority of the inhabitants are hypocrites. The main protagonists are the village gardener and his married lover, an abused housewife. Things become complicated for the lovers when the woman's husband murders a miserly neighbour to steal his gold and frames the gardener.

The Village was initially made for the British television channel Channel 4. Pizazz Pictures (now known as Studio AKA), which was the studio where the crew worked, in managed the production, with Baker serving as director; Pizazz Pictures also distributed the animation. The Village aired on Channel 4 as a "Pizazz Pictures production".

Today, The Village is available to watch on Baker's official website and YouTube channel.

== Plot ==
In a small village, there are a group of houses about each other, forming a ring around the central square. The majority of the villagers are cruel and hypocritical: the cleaning woman secretly harvests, but never shares the apples from the tree in the square; the parish priest is an alcoholic and spits on the prisoner; the miser hoards his gold coins; the nosy old woman spies on her neighbours; and a married man berates his wife whenever she prepares meals he hates.

The only time the mistreated wife is happy is when she is in the company of the gardener, whom she is having an affair with. One Sunday afternoon after the Mass, the gardener and his girlfriend are having sex outside the village when the woman's husband decides to rob the miser. Using a ladder, the greedy man climbs up into the miser's house, kills him by throwing him out the window, and steals his gold. The gardener spots the miser's corpse, but when he climbs up the ladder to investigate, the old woman mistakenly believes that he had killed the miser, and screams for help as the gardener is arrested for the crime.

As the gardener sits in prison, a funeral is held for the miser, with the real murderer filling the grave with soil. While the villagers are building a gallows to hang the gardener on, his girlfriend secretly gives him a shovel, which he then uses to dig a tunnel and escape. However, the prisoner sounds the alarm, and the villagers form an angry mob and look for the gardener, who has climbed up a vine and hidden himself on his girlfriend's roof. That night, the murderer confronts the gardener on the rooftop and snatches his glasses, intending to push him off. When the woman fails to stop her husband, the gardener saves her and himself by punching the murderer in the head, sending him falling to his death. The woman quickly guides her near-sighted lover out of the village as a colony of ants strip her dead husband's body down to the bone. The next morning, the villagers wake up to find the murderer's skeleton clutching the stolen glasses. Believing that the gardener has died, they sadly dismantle the gallows and reluctantly go back to their hypocritical lives.

Outside the village, the runaway lovers look at the town one last time before leaving to start a new life together. The film ends with the ant colony collecting the remains of the husband back to their anthill, with one of them finding the gardener’s glasses.

== Cast ==
The cast consisted of three voice actors: Annie Griffin who played the roles of all the female villagers, including the old woman and the adulterous wife, and Dave Western and James Baker who both played the roles of the male villagers such the gardener, the miser, and murderer.

== Production ==
=== Production in 1993 ===
The production of the short animation film took about 3 months as stated by Baker, the film was produced by a team of 32 animators including Baker, five sound engineers, one Cameraman and electrical engineer, one editor, one producer and one more person for additional crew. Baker, who directed and wrote the screenplay, explained how the animation was created, stating, "Since leaving the National Film & Television School in 1988, I had worked for a time at TVC, London before joining Pizazz Pictures. At Pizazz I designed and directed adverts and title sequences, but right from the start I was also working on The Village. Pam Dennis and Mario Cavalli, were keen to help me get my next film in production and together we approached Clare Kitson at Channel Four".

"I liked the idea of the village having a definite inside and outside, with most of the characters staying in their houses and occasionally scuttling across the courtyard from one building to another. I worked out a basic plan for the layout of the houses and who was going to live in each one.

Since the characters walk about a lot, this layout was one of the few things that remained constant through all the drafts of the script and storyboarding."

"Once I had completed what I regarded as the final draft of the script, I translated it into a drawn storyboard by first printing out the typed script under blank storyboard squares. Filling in these blank squares with drawings was a very fast process, since I had been imagining the action, and writing about it for so long. I think the final storyboard took about two days to draw (compared with a year, off and on between commercial work at Pizazz, working on the script)".

"The Village started life as a sort of reaction to The Hill Farm. I wanted to show a darker side of rural or isolated life, and I wanted the whole story to come from elements within the location, rather than having other characters turning up to get the action going. I spent a lot of time just trying to invent elements that could fit into this kind of situation. During this period I couldn't settle on a final plot line, so my first proposals to Channel Four, were more along the lines of describing the characters and possible ways the story might go".

"I had animated The Hill Farm on my own, but it had taken three years... The production time allowed for animating The Village was just over three months, and I was going to work with a team of animators. This was one of the reasons the character designs had to be translated into detailed model sheets. I also laid out the whole film on sheets of animation paper, before the animation started. A large proportion of the budget was made of animators' wages, so we had to keep the process as organized as possible.

The animators were Neville Astley, Mark Baker, Sally Baxter, Roxanne Ducharme, Caroline Cruikshank, Alyson Hamilton, Vanessa Luther-Smith, Gaston Marzio, Tom Newman, Isabel Radage, Sharon Smith, Paul Stone, Pete Western, and Julia Woolf.

Pam Dennis, the producer, and her assistant, Angela Cocker, would check with us on a weekly basis to find out if we were keeping up with the schedule. We were always behind, but somehow we got the animation done, only straying a couple of weeks over schedule", "Annie Kocur edited the rushes and Julian Nott composed his score to the final picture edit. Danny Hambrook started track-laying the sound effects. We had less time than on The Hill Farm, but we worked in more or less the same way, track-laying in the day and recording effects at night. The main difference was that we worked digitally and in Dolby stereo. Certain effects proved harder to get than others – in particular, the scratchy noises made by the ants, which ended up being a mixture of several sounds. Dominique Wolf recorded extra voices and effects and the final sound mix was by Adrian Rhodes".

=== 4K scan and restoration by Modern Film Labs California (2016) ===
In October 2016, a 4K scan and restoration of the film was made to improve the quality. The restored version is available on YouTube and on Mark Baker's website.

== Reception ==
=== Mark Baker's personal description of The Village ===
"The film is set in a small, isolated village where everyone has something to hide. The villagers spend about half their time trying to find out their neighbours' secrets and the other half trying to preserve their own. One villager seems to have no interest in this way of life, and is considered an outsider. He comes under special scrutiny from the rest of the village, and his every move is noted..."

"The Village is a 14 minute long animation film that uses the traditional animation technique of cel and painted backgrounds. It has virtually no dialogue. It was funded by Channel Four Television and produced by Pam Dennis at Pizazz Pictures, London."

=== General reception ===
The Village first aired at evening in May 1993 on Channel 4. The reception of the short film was mainly very positive.

== Awards and nominations ==
=== Nominations ===
In 1994 The Village was nominated twice, an Oscar award for the Academy Award for Best Animated Short Film with Mark Baker attending and also for the British Academy of Film and Television Arts awards as a nominee for best animated short film.

=== Awards summary ===
The Village was given eight awards, it was awarded the best "Animated Production Especially Produced for Television and Not Part of a Series" at the Ottawa International Animation Festival in 1994, in the same year the Hiroshima International Animation Festival awarded The Village the "Hiroshima prize", Carrousel International du Film awarded it the best short film award, in the Annecy International Animation Film Festival the animation was awarded the prize of "Special Jury Award", Cartoon Forum, Europe awarded it the prize of "Cartoon d'Or", The Village was awarded the best animated film and FIPRESCI prize at the 1993 Kraków Film Festival. It was also awarded the best short film prize at the Chicago International Film Festival in 1993.

==== List of awards, 1993–1994 ====
Festival	Prize	Year
Annecy International Animation Film Festival	Special Jury Award	1993
Cartoon Forum, Europe	Cartoon d'Or3	1993
Kraków Film Festival	Silver Dragon (1st prize) for Best Animated Film and FIPRESCI Prize	1993
Chicago International Film Festival	Best Short Film, Silver HUGO prize	1993
Stuttgart International Film Festival	2nd place for best animated short film	1993
Carrousel International du Film	Best Short Film	1993
Ottawa International Animation Festival	Animated Production Especially Produced for Television and Not Part of a Series	1994
Hiroshima International Animation Festival	The Hiroshima Prize	1994
Festival du Mons, Belgium	1st Prize	1994
