= Millennium People =

2003 novel by J. G. Ballard

Cover of the first edition, published by Flamingo.

Millennium People is a novel by British writer J. G. Ballard, published in 2003. The novel is the story of a rebellion in the middle classes in an enclave of Greater London.

== Plot summary ==
When a bomb explodes on a baggage carousel at Heathrow Airport, killing his ex-wife, psychologist David Markham tries to unravel the mystery surrounding her seemingly pointless death. But with unresolved questions about himself, his job, and his loving but adulterous wife, Sally, he soon finds himself immersed in the deeper waters of middle-class revolution originating from the gated community of Chelsea Marina, an upper middle-class enclave of salaried professionals.

When a protest at a cat show turns ugly and he is beaten up by angry cat lovers, then arrested and tried, Markham enlists in the cause of the rebellious Chelseans – imagining he will uncover the persons and causes responsible for his ex-wife's murder. Slowly, he succumbs to the call of subversion and gradually finds himself a terrorist functionary, planting smoke bombs, participating in firebombing and clashing with police at protests.

Other characters include Markham's wife, who continues to use her arm canes though her leg injuries from an accident with a tram have completely healed; Kay Churchill, a sociopathic college film studies lecturer who has become a terrorist cell leader (she takes Markham for a lover and he lives in her home); a troubled priest and his Chinese girlfriend; a former MI5 bombmaker and scientist turned revolutionary, and Richard Gould, a seemingly kindly pediatrician who is the terrorist mastermind behind the whole revolution.

Ultimately, as Markham gets closer to the pediatrician, Markham uncovers clues explaining his former wife's murder. While Markham had previously thought the bombing to be a random attack, he finds that the Heathrow bomb did have an intended target. As police and security forces close in on Chelsea Marina, Markham joins the other protesters on the barricades and he crosses over from infiltrator to member of the revolution.
