= Enn Reitel =

British actor (born 1950)

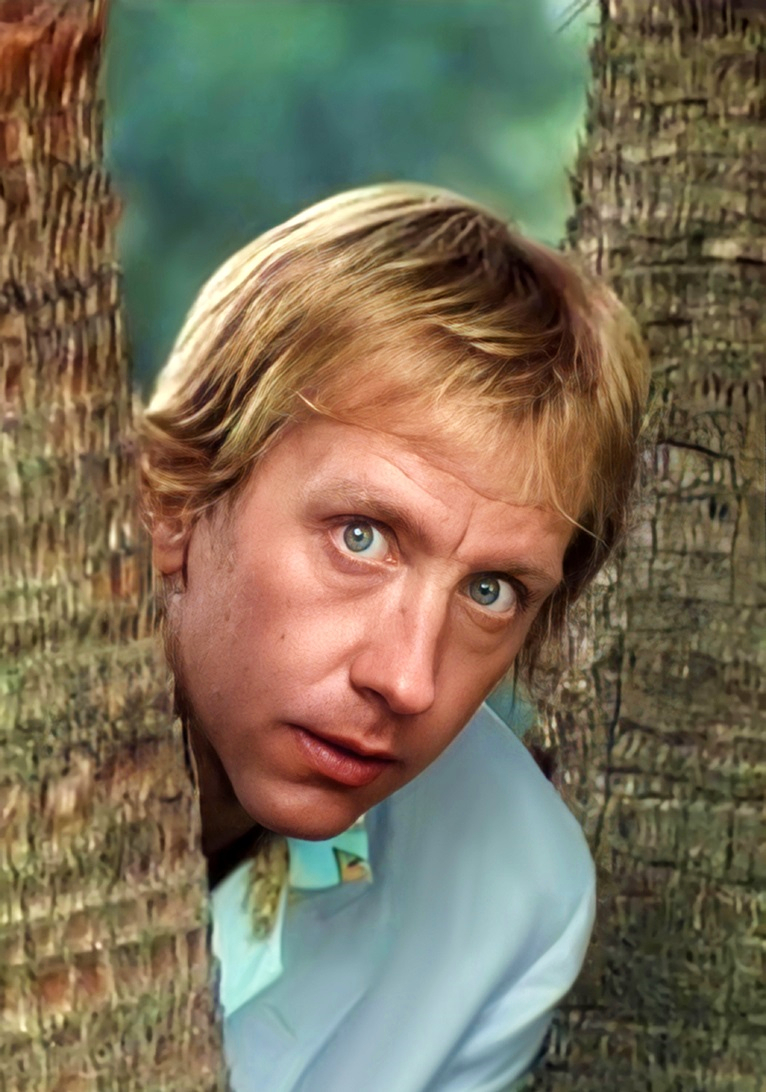
- Reitel in The Optimist in 1983
- Born: June 21 1950; Forfar, Angus, Scotland
- Education: Royal Central School of Speech and Drama
- Occupation: Actor
- Years active: 1977–present

Enn Reitel (born June 21 1950) is a Scottish actor who specialises in voice work in films, television series, and video games.

== Early life ==
Reitel's family arrived in Scotland as refugees from Estonia. He trained as an actor at the Central School of Speech and Drama.

== Career ==
=== Acting ===
In 1982, Reitel starred in The Further Adventures of Lucky Jim, a sitcom on BBC Two written by Dick Clement and Ian La Frenais. Reitel played Jim Dixon, based on the character created by Kingsley Amis.

He appeared on stage in Me and My Girl at the Adelphi Theatre in 1986. On television he worked as an impressionist on the satirical puppet show Spitting Image and starred in the ITV sitcom Mog as a burglar who spent his days in a psychiatric hospital, pretending to be insane.

Reitel in The Optimist

He played the lead role in the UK television comedy series The Optimist which ran from 1983 for two series. The programme was almost entirely silent. In each episode 'The Optimist' wandered through life doing his best to look on the bright side. He was usually thwarted in his endeavours by the people he encountered. He also appeared in the first series of the UK comedy show Whose Line Is It Anyway?.

Reitel also appeared in a number of BBC radio comedy programmes in the 1980s, including Dial M For Pizza and the radio adaptation of the cartoon strip The Fosdyke Saga.

In 2001, he appeared in a short film called Coconuts with Michael Palin, in which they did a demonstration on how coconuts can be used in place of horses. This film can be seen on the second disk of the collector's edition of Monty Python and the Holy Grail.

He played the lead role in the 2007 film Trust Me, a comedy about a pair of con men.

Reitel was the second choice to play Del Boy Trotter in Only Fools and Horses (behind Jim Broadbent aka Roy Slater in the series), but was busy with other projects (the role ultimately went to David Jason).

He also played two roles in different episodes of long-running sitcom One Foot in the Grave. In the first Christmas special, he played "Mr. Starkey", a down and out who holds Victor Meldrew (Richard Wilson) and his neighbour Pippa's father, Reverend Croker (Geoffrey Chater) at gunpoint to wait for Armageddon on Christmas Day. In the second episode of series 3, "Dreamland", he played a tramp who took a fancy to Victor's shoes, but drew the line at his Noel Edmonds-esque sweater.

=== Voiceovers ===
Reitel does voiceovers for The X Factor. He played the Town Crier and The Maggot in Tim Burton's Corpse Bride and played Auric Goldfinger in the 2004 video game GoldenEye: Rogue Agent. It is his voice that provides the vocals on Lemon Jelly's "Nice Weather for Ducks" in 2002. He narrated the in-game promo spot for the Praying Mantis PMC in Metal Gear Solid 4: Guns of the Patriots. He also does Lorenzo Belli's voice from Capcom's survival horror game Haunting Ground. He was also the voice of Billy the ventriloquist dummy in James Wan's movie Dead Silence. He also provided voice performance for the audiobook of the sixth book in Eoin Colfer's Artemis Fowl series, The Time Paradox. Reitel also provided the voice for Delvin Mallory in The Elder Scrolls V: Skyrim and the Wizard Zabodon in The Big Knights. He also provided the voice of Ost Ordura in Kingdoms of Amalur: Reckoning, and Alfred Pennyworth in Batman: The Telltale Series (2016), as well as its sequel Batman: The Enemy Within (2017). He also played Male Altmer and Dunmer in The Elder Scrolls Online. He also provided voices of The Time Keeper in Skylanders: Swap Force, Laufey in Hulk and the Agents of S.M.A.S.H., Master Ding in Kung Fu Panda: Legends of Awesomeness, Sebastian Oliver in Adr1ft, Olgan in Baten Kaitos Origins, Bootstrap Bill Turner in Pirates of the Caribbean: Dead Man's Chest, A Male Pedestrian in Infamous, Deraegis in Batman: The Brave and the Bold, Five Leaf Clover Guy, Japanese Deputy, Robertson, Boss Guraji and Fox in TripTank, Edwin Jarvis in Marvel Heroes, An English Spy in American Dad!, Billy in Dead Silence and The Dreamer in The Secret World. In May 2014, Reitel replaced Ade Edmondson as the voice of the Animal in the Peperami adverts.

== Filmography ==
=== Film ===
- Animal Madness – Various
- Bedrooms – Walter
- Bob's Weekend – Voice of Man on Television
- Carrott U Like – Additional voices
- Chicanery – Windsor Silcox
- Corpse Bride – Maggot, Town Crier
- Dead Silence – Billy
- Foodfight! – Kung Tofu, Fracois Fromage
- Forgotten Daughters – Liam
- Gobble – Voice over artist
- Just Another Secret (1989) – Dietrich
- Labyrinth – Goblin (uncredited)
- Made in Estonia – NATO general
- Original Gangster – Cleaner
- Postman Pat: The Movie – PC Arthur Selby, Reverend Timms, Pat Wannabe 2, Raed
- Quackerz – Emperor Peng Lee
- Secret History of Religion: Doomsday - Book of Revelation – Narrator
- Secret History of Religion: Knights Templar – Narrator
- Splitting Image: Down and Out in the White House – Additional voices
- The Adventures of Tintin – Nestor, Mr. Crabtree
- The Best Years – Father Jude Best
- The Cannibal in the Jungle – Jan Voorhees
- The Full Monty – Narrator (uncredited)
- The Judge – Mourner
- The Lime Grove Story
- The Merchant of Venice – Launcelot Gobbo
- The Prestige – Workman 1
- The Santa Clause 3: The Escape Clause – (uncredited)
- The Willows in Winter – Otter
- The Wind in the Willows – Otter, Rabbit, Policeman, Gaoler
- Throne of Elves – Blacksmith
- Tiny Revolutions – Secret policeman
- Trust Me – Joe

=== Shorts ===
- Couples and Robbers – Keith
- Day After Yesterday – The Dad
- Doppelganger – Dowdsley
- Ogri – Sweeney
- Splitting Image: The Ronnie and Nancy Show – Additional voices
- The Band Parts – Harry

=== Documentaries ===
- Cosmos: A Spacetime Odyssey – Albert Einstein, hyde Park Gent
- Heroes of Comedy
- How to Use Your Coconuts – Assistant
- Inside the Two Worlds of 'The Corpse Bride' – Maggot (uncredited)
- I Love 1980's – Himself
- Monkey Business – PG Tips Chimp
- Science of the Bible – Narrator

=== Television specials ===
- Comic Relief – Himself

=== Television series ===
- 2DTV – Prime Minister Tony Blair, Jack Straw, John Prescott, Michael Jackson, Anthony McPartlin, Jeremy Clarkson, Michael Howard, Simon Cowell, Gordon Ramsay, Prince Harry, Tom Cruise, Laurence Llewelyn-Bowen, Pope John Paul II, Johnny Vegas, Will Young, Tim Henman, Justin Hawkins, Jack Osbourne, Phil Spencer, David Dimbleby, Peter Andre, Frank Skinner, Des Lynam, Robbie Williams, Gareth Gates, Uri Geller, David Blunkett, Charles Kennedy, Dick Cheney, Arnold Schwarzenegger, Prince Philip, Prince Edward, Prince William, Osama bin Laden, Wayne Rooney, Various voices
- American Dad! – English Spy
- Archer – Additional voices
- Art Ninja – Narrator
- Barney – Narrator / Additional voices
- Batman: The Brave and the Bold – Deraegis
- Boston Legal – Father Kevin Maher
- Bremner, Bird and Fortune
- Comedy Playhouse – Narrator
- Canned Carrott – Narrator
- Coronation Street – Photographer
- Cribb – Mr. Strange
- Charlie and Lola – Hedgehogs, Additional Voices (2 episode)
- Drop the Dead Donkey – Voice-Over
- Family Guy - Mickey Rooney, Additional voices
- Fanboy & Chum Chum – Wizard Tooth Fairy (Episode "Tooth or Scare")
- General Hospital – Policeman
- Grey's Anatomy – Gerhardt Strauss
- Hulk and the Agents of S.M.A.S.H. – Laufey
- ITV Sunday Night Drama – The Reporter
- Kung Fu Panda: Legends of Awesomeness – Master Ding
- Minoriteam – Jewcano, Narrator
- Misfits – Skinner
- Mog – Mog
- Monkey Dust – Additional voices
- Mr. Bean: The Animated Series – Additional voices
- One Foot in the Grave – The Tramp, Starkey
- Pallas – Actor
- Percy the Park Keeper – Male animals
- Peter Panzerfaust – Older Gilbert
- Phineas and Ferb – Additional voices
- Roadies – Edgar Cumberland Hughes
- Rory Bremner – Various
- Round the Bend – Additional voices
- Screen One – Rick
- Sheeep – Gogol, Moze, Uncle Elliott, Mrs. Wolfgang, Additional voices
- Spitting Image – Geoffrey Howe, Cecil Parkinson, Robert Maxwell, Dustin Hoffman, Denis Thatcher, Norman Fowler, Konstantin Chernenko, Prince Philip, Paddy Ashdown, Chris Patten, Michael Jackson, Denis Healey, Nelson Mandela, Julian Clary, Winston Churchill, Donald Sinden, Lester Piggott, Peter Snow, David Owen, Mark Phillips, Alec Guinness, Ian St John, OJ Simpson, Gary Barlow, Prince William, Paul Condon, Jack Straw, Satan, Paul Keating, Kenneth Baker, Phil Cool, Paul Channon, Pope John Paul II, Donald Coggan, Jesse Jackson, David Attenborough, Mikhail Gorbachev, Nicholas Witchell, David Icke, West Midlands Police Sergeant, Norman Tebbit, Polish advertiser, Neil Kinnock, Kenneth Clarke, George Younger, Elton John, Matt Aitken, Laurence Olivier, Frank Bruno, Prince Harry, Frank Bough, Richard Branson, Robert Maclennan, Mark Knopfler, Caspar Weinberger, Rick Rickerson, Q, Desmond Wilcox, Ray Cooney, Nicholas Fairbairn, David Gergen, Vincent Price, Bobby Robson, Ian MacGregor, Roy Jenkins, Paul McCartney, Kieran Prendiville, Translator, Prince
- Squirrel Boy – Manzio
- The Adventures of Dodo – Dodo (Voice)
- The Almost Complete History of the 20th Century – Various Characters
- The Big Knights – Wizard Zabodon
- The Bill – Nigel Doughtie
- The Gentle Touch – TDC Power
- The Ghosts of Motley Hall – Assistant Director
- The Imaginatively Titled Punt & Dennis Show
- The Further Adventures of Lucky Jim – Jim Dixon
- The Optimist – The Optimist
- The Staggering Stories of Ferdinand de Bargos – Actor
- The Thundermans – Basil Healy Hutchinson
- The Wingfeather Saga – Zouzab, Shaggy, Buzzard Willie
- The World of Peter Rabbit and Friends – Robin, Mr. Bouncer, Cock Robin, Insects, Grocer, Animals, Kep, Mr. Drake Puddle-Duck, Sparrows
- Tractor Tom – Narrator
- TripTank – Five Leaf Clover Guy, Japanese Deputy, Boss Guraji, Robertson, Fox
- Union Jackass – George
- Virtual Murder – Jed Frewin

=== Television mini-series ===
- Ashenden – Radio Disc Jockey
- If You See God, Tell Him – With the voices of

=== Videos ===
- The Beano Video – Singer on Record, Pa Bear, Ma Bear (burping in Scorcher), Ted Bear, Hank, Horse, Dog, Scorcher, Hare, Narrator #2
- The Beano Videostars – Walter the Softy (Flutterby and Dennis Meets His Match), Aliens, Female Alien, Police Officer #1, Winston, Doctor, Hairdresser, Robot, Pa Bear, Ted Bear, Hank, Chicken, Chick, Ma's Porridge Narrator, Pedestrian #2, Poolgoer #3, Child

=== Video games ===
Year	Title	Role	Notes
1995	Flight of the Amazon Queen	Anderson, Klunk, Rico, Henry, Charon, Crystal Robot	
1998	Heart of Darkness	Servant	
2004	The Bard's Tale	Additional voices	
2004	GoldenEye: Rogue Agent	Auric Goldfinger	
2005	Haunting Ground	Old Lorenzo	
2005	The Chronicles of Narnia: The Lion, the Witch and the Wardrobe	Mr. Beaver	
2006	The Da Vinci Code	Bezu Fache, Police Officer 2	
2007	The Golden Compass	Machine Gun Tartar, Master's Companion, Prisoner	
2007	TimeShift	Dr. Aiden Krone	
2008	Metal Gear Solid 4: Guns of the Patriots	Praying Mantis, Narrator	
2010	Clash of the Titans	Spyros, Solon, Soldier, Fisherman	
2011	The Elder Scrolls V: Skyrim	Delvin Mallory	
2012	Men in Black: Alien Crisis	Professor Thurgood, C-YA Programmer Weissman, MIB Agent	
2013	Marvel Heroes	Edwin Jarvis	
2015	Leo's Fortune	Leo	
2016	Batman: The Telltale Series	Alfred Pennyworth	
2017	Prey	Dr. Lorenzo Calvino	
2017	Batman: The Enemy Within	Alfred Pennyworth	
2019	Kingdom Hearts III	Scrooge McDuck	
2020	Final Fantasy VII Remake	Deputy Mayor Hart	
2023	Disney Dreamlight Valley	Scrooge McDuck	
2023	Hogwarts Legacy	Professor Abraham Ronen, Gerbold Ollivander, Deek, Percival Rackham, Solomon Sallow, Eddie Thistlewood, Goblin Banker, Alfred Lawley, Ackley Barnes, Sir Gareth Seaford, Pádraic Haggarty, George Osric, Otto Dibble, Sir Cadogan, Rooky, Nonsuch, Townsperson, Hubert Gray, Ghost, Dark Wizard, Goblin Loyalist, Prisoner, Carriage Driver, Centaur	

- 007: Quantum of Solace – Mr. White
- Adr1ft – Sebastian Oliver
- Avatar: The Game – Additional voices
- Baten Kaitos Origins – Olgan
- Cold Winter – Amenkoht Ali-Salah
- Dishonored – Nurse Trimble – The Brigmore Witches DLC
- Driver
- Epic Mickey – Additional voices
- Infamous – Male Pedestrian
- Kingdoms of Amalur: Reckoning – Ost Ordura, additional voices
- Legendary – LeFey
- Meet the Robinsons
- Original War – Additional voices
- Pirates of the Caribbean: Dead Man's Chest – Bootstrap Bill Turner
- Resistance: Fall of Man – Additional voices
- SpongeBob Moves In! – Mermaid Man
- Skylanders: Swap Force – Time Keeper
- Star Wars: The Old Republic: Galactic Starfighter – Writch Hurley
- Star Wars: The Old Republic: Rise of the Hutt Cartel – Additional voices
- The Chronicles of Narnia: Prince Caspian – Additional voices
- The Elder Scrolls Online – Male Altmer, Male Dunmer
- The Getaway: Black Monday – Additional voices
- The Lord of the Rings: Aragorn's Quest – Additional voices
- The Secret World – The Dreamer, additional voices
- The Weakest Link – Contestants (UK version)
- Warhammer Online: Wrath of Heroes – Archivist
- World in Conflict – Additional voices
- World in Conflict: Soviet Assault – Additional voices
