= Mark Baker (animator) =

British animator (born 1959)

- Born: 8 April 1959 (age 67); London, England
- Occupations: Animator, producer

Mark Baker (born 8 April 1959) is an English animator and producer whose works include the Academy Award-nominated short films The Hill Farm (1988), The Village (1993) and Jolly Roger (1998). He is also known for co-creating The Big Knights (1999-2000) Peppa Pig (2004–present) and Ben & Holly's Little Kingdom (2009–2013) with Neville Astley.

== Information ==
A contemporary of Nick Park at the National Film and Television School in London, Mark Baker now works for Astley Baker Davies. His films, The Hill Farm and Jolly Roger and The Village, were included in the Animation Show of Shows. Baker has received Oscar nominations for his animated short films. He emerged as an animator in the 1970s. He draws in a childlike style with a sophisticated world view. His film The Hill Farm (1988) received an Oscar nomination, a BAFTA, the Grand Prix at the Annecy Animation Festival and the praise of the Russian animator Yuri Norstein. Baker completed The Village for Channel 4 in 1993. In 1994, Baker partnered with Neville Astley to create the production company of Astley Baker that was later changed to the name of Astley Baker Davies with the addition of producer Phil Davies. In 2003 he participated in Kihachirō Kawamoto's collaborative project Winter Days.

== Background ==
Baker was born in London on 8 April 1959. In his teen years, Baker began to make animated films on 8 mm film. He studied animation at the West Surrey College of Art and Design (now University for the Creative Arts) where he created the short film The Three Knights (1982). He animating television commercials for Richard Purdum Productions. Baker enrolled in the National Film and Television School where he created the short film The Hill Farm (1988). He graduated in 1989 and worked as a freelance animator and director for TVC, Speedy Films, David Anderson Films and Pizazz Pictures.

== Preservation ==
The Academy Film Archive has preserved several of Mark Baker's films, including Jolly Roger, The Hill Farm, and The Village.

In 2021, The Hill Farm, Jolly Roger, and The Village were restored, with all three short films available to watch on Baker's YouTube channel.

== See also ==
- The Village
