= Astley Baker Davies =

British animation studio

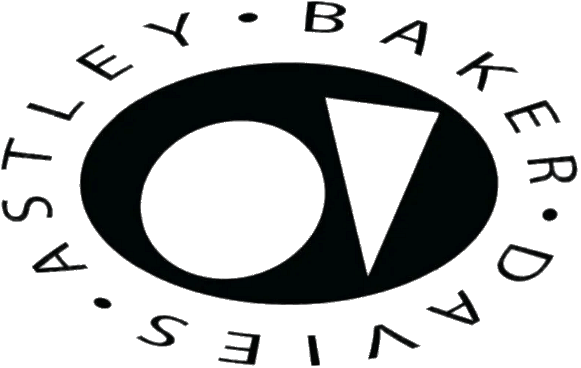
- Type: Subsidiary
- Industry: Animation
- Founded: January 1994; 32 years ago
- Founders: Neville Astley; Mark Baker; Phil Davies
- Headquarters: London, England
- Products: The Big Knights; Peppa Pig; Ben & Holly's Little Kingdom
- Number of employees: 7 (2021)
- Parent: Entertainment One (2015–2023, 70%); Hasbro Entertainment (2023–present, 70%)
- Website: astleybakerdavies.com

Astley Baker Davies is a British animation studio based in London, England, originally owned by founder-directors Neville Astley, Mark Baker, and Phil Davies. It is the production company behind television series The Big Knights, Peppa Pig, and Ben & Holly's Little Kingdom. In 2015, it became a subsidiary of Entertainment One, which took a 70% stake. In 2023, Hasbro kept eOne's stake in the company, making it the majority subsidiary of Hasbro's newly created division Hasbro Entertainment, due to eOne's non-children assets being sold to Lionsgate later in the year.

On 16 March 2021, it was announced that Entertainment One renewed Peppa Pig until 2027, and after 19 years, the original creators and the company were going to leave production. Animation studio Karrot Animation (known for producing Sarah & Duck) will take over production from then on.

== Filmography ==
=== Film ===
- Peppa Pig: The Golden Boots (2015)
- Peppa Pig: My First Cinema Experience (2017)
- Peppa Pig: Festival of Fun (2019)

=== Television ===
Series	Year(s)	Co-production with	Network	Notes
1990s
The Big Knights	1999–2000	BBC Worldwide; BBC Bristol	BBC One	As The Big Knights Ltd.
2000s
Peppa Pig	2004–present	Contender Entertainment Group (series 1); Rubber Duck Entertainment/E1 Kids/Entertainment One Family (series 2–4); Entertainment One (series 5–8); The Elf Factory Limited (series 5); Gaston's Cave Ltd (series 6–8); Karrot Animation (series 7–present); Hasbro Entertainment (series 8–present)	Channel 5/Nick Jr.	Longest running series produced by the company. Continued by Karrot Animation starting in 2023.
Ben & Holly's Little Kingdom	2009–2013	Rubber Duck Entertainment/E1 Kids/Entertainment One Family	Channel 5/Nick Jr.	

== Awards and nominations ==
- 2012 - British Animation Awards - Winner for Best Preschool Series for "Ben and Holly's Little Kingdom: Acorn Day"
