= Hearing Test (Peppa Pig) =

- Peppa Pig episode
- Peppa and George's hearing test
- Episode no.: Season 11; Episode 1
- Written by: Ryan Denham
- Original air date: 23 March 2026

Guest appearance
- Jodie Ounsley as an audiologist

Episode chronology
← Previous "Doctor Hamster's Ant Farm"	Next → "Favourite Sound"

"Hearing Test" is the first episode of the eleventh season of the British animated preschool children's television series Peppa Pig. It originally aired on Nickelodeon on 23 March 2026. The episode sees George Pig undergo a hearing test, and he is diagnosed with moderate hearing loss. The episode was developed in partnership with the National Deaf Children's Society (NDCS), and deaf television personality Jodie Ounsley voiced an audiologist.

== Plot and production ==
Mummy Pig and Daddy Pig drive their children Peppa Pig, George Pig and Evie Pig to a doctor's office for Evie's first hearing test. At the doctor's office, all three children are tested, as George is unable to say Peppa's name, instead saying "dinosaur". The family are brought into an audiology room to have the test, consisting of blocks being put into a bucket when the kids hear a sound through headphones. After the hearing test, George is diagnosed with moderate hearing loss in one ear that developed later in life. George is given a hearing aid, which he retained in later episodes.

Ahead of the episode's release, an episode of Peppa Pig Tales told from George's audio perspective was released. "Hearing Test" was developed in partnership with the NDCS. It was first broadcast on Nickelodeon on 23 March at 2pm UTC, as the first episode of the series' eleventh season. Television personality Jodie Ounsley—who is deaf herself and uses a cochlear implant—voiced the audiologist. The storyline continued throughout the rest of season 11, with episodes depicting the daily life of a deaf child.

Following the release of the episode, a costumed Daddy Pig ran the 2026 London Marathon to raise money for the NDCS. Within the show's storyline, Daddy Pig chose to run the marathon after learning of George's partial deafness.

== Reception ==
Animation Magazine, USA Today and East Coast Radio consider the deaf representation to be a continuation of Peppa Pig's representation of minority groups, as the show has previously depicted a character in a wheelchair (Mandy Mouse) and a character with two mothers (Penny the Polar Bear). The Animation World Network considers the episode to be a "defining moment" for George.

In an ITV interview, Ounsley said the role of the audiologist was very close to her heart, and that she never would have imagined one day doing such a storyline on the show when she watched it growing up. Speaking to Metro, George Crockford—the chief executive of the NDCS—praised the episode's representation, saying that it will have a "profound impact".
