= Bea Smith =

Bea Smith may refer to:

- Bea Smith (Prisoner), a character from the Australian TV series Prisoner portrayed by Val Lehman
- Bea Smith (Wentworth), a character from the Australian TV series Wentworth portrayed by Danielle Cormack, and a reimagining of the character from Prisoner

== See also ==
- B. Smith (1949–2020; Barbara Elaine Smith), American restaurateur, model, author, and television host
- Amelie Bea Smith, British actress, voice of Peppa Pig
