= List of Peppa Pig characters =

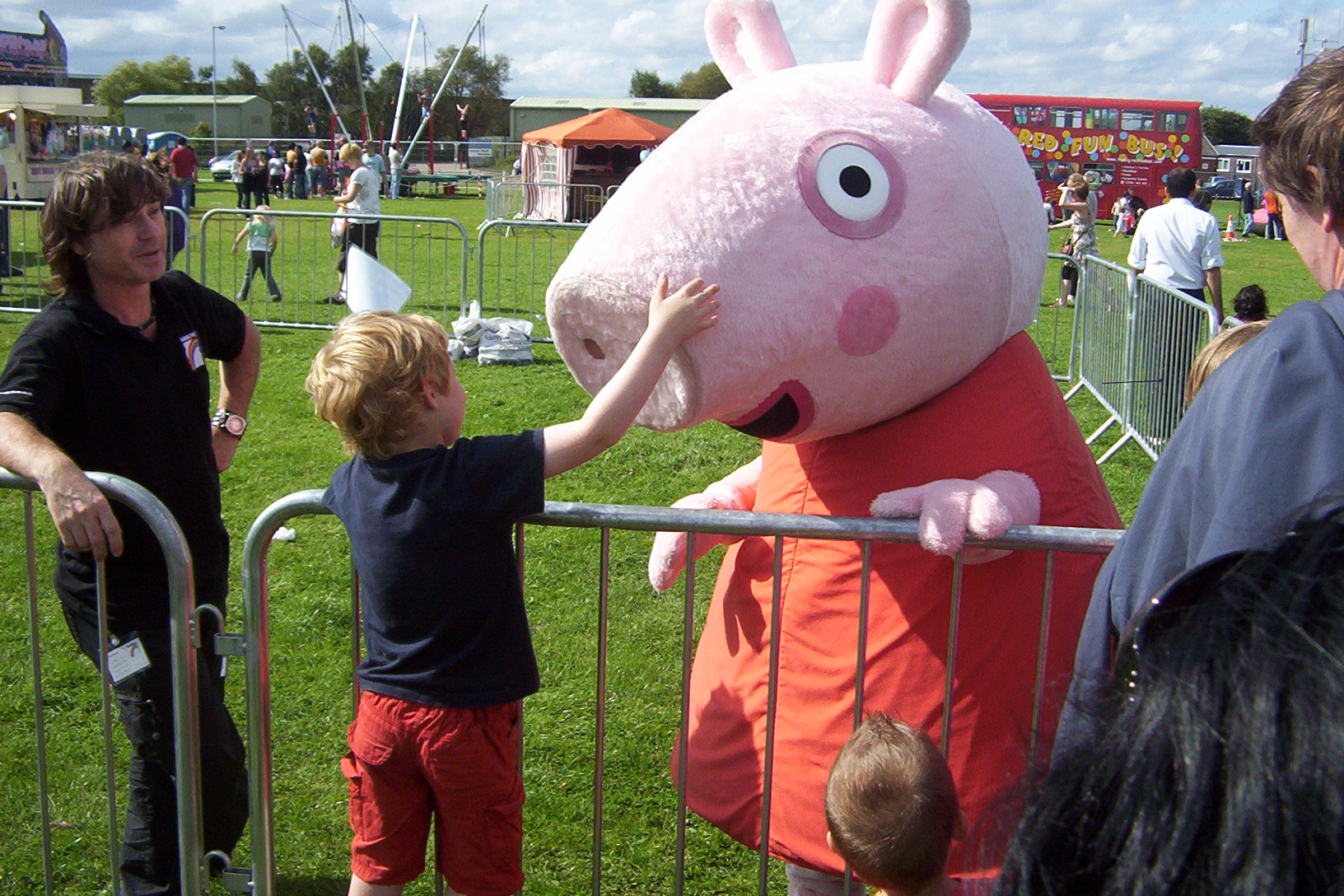
A person dressed as Peppa Pig at a personal appearance

Peppa Pig is a British preschool animated television series by Astley Baker Davies. The series is narrated by John Sparkes. Its characters are listed below.

== The Pigs ==
- Peppa Pig (voiced by Lily Snowden-Fine in series 1, Cecily Bloom in series 2, Harley Bird in "Peppa's Christmas" and series 3–6, Amelie Bea Smith in series 6–8, Harriette Cox since late series 8, Sydney Patrick in the US Tickle-U dub, Tibby Radcliffe in Peppa Pig Tales, and Isla Rose Guerin in later episodes of Tales) – The titular character of the show, Peppa is a cheeky little piglet who loves jumping in muddy puddles. She wears a red dress and black shoes, and dons her signature "golden" boots when puddle-jumping. She is the only character to appear in every episode.
- George Pig (vocal effects provided by Alice May, voiced by Oliver May in series 1–5, Vincent van Hulzen in series 6 and 7, Kira Monteith since series 8, Joanna Ruiz in Tales, and Eliyas Taiwo in later episodes of Tales) – George is Peppa's little brother. He is often seen with his toy dinosaur, named "Mr. Dinosaur", which he usually calls "Dine-saw". He wears a blue shirt. He cries in several episodes with his trademark showers of tears and very loud crying sounds. In series 9, it is revealed that George is moderately deaf and he starts wearing a hearing aid.
- Evie Pig (voiced by Holly Park) – Evie is Peppa and George's baby sister. Her debut was announced in February 2025 on Good Morning Britain. She was named after Mummy Pig's aunt, and was introduced in the episode "Baby's Arrival" (known as "New Baby" in the US) on 20 May 2025 in theatres.
- Mummy Pig (voiced by Morwenna Banks in the series and Harriet Carmichael in Tales) – Mummy Pig is Peppa's home-employed mother, often seen working on a computer. She is also a volunteer firefighter and an author. She wears an orange dress.
- Daddy Pig (voiced by Richard Ridings, Andrew Macheca in the pitch pilot, Oscar Cheda in the US dub, and George Weightman in Tales) – Daddy Pig is Peppa's father. He wears glasses due to his poor eyesight, but has trouble map reading. Peppa and other characters often make fun of his "big tummy", which Daddy Pig doesn't seem bothered by. He is also shown to have a fear of heights. He works as a structural engineer and a concrete technician. He wears a greenish turquoise shirt.
- Grandpa Pig (voiced by David Graham (posthumously from 2024 to 2027)), Heath Kelts in the US dub, and George Weightman in Tales) – Grandpa Pig is Peppa's grandfather. He has a trackless train named Gertrude and loves sailing and gardening. Some garden features, however, such as garden gnomes and plastic wells, tend to anger him. He is often seen wearing a sailing cap with a white anchor on the front. He wears an indigo shirt.
- Granny Pig (voiced by Frances White, Nanique Gheridan in the US dub, and Harriet Carmichael in Tales) – Granny Pig is Peppa's grandmother. She wears a magenta dress and is a fan of perfume. She grows apples in an orchard near her house along with vegetables in her own garden next to her house. She also has four pet chickens that often annoy Grandpa Pig.
- Uncle Pig (voiced by John Sparkes) – Uncle Pig is Peppa's uncle. He wears a dark blue shirt and has many similarities with his younger brother, Daddy Pig.
- Auntie Pig (voiced by Alison Snowden in series 1 and 2 and Judy Flynn since series 3) – Auntie Pig is Peppa's aunt. She wears a pink polka-dotted dress.
- Chloe Pig (voiced by Eloise May in series 1 and 2, Abigail Daniels in series 3, Zara Siddiqi in series 4, Charlotte Potterton in series 6, Alana Wall since series 8, and Imogen Dymott in Tales) – Chloe is Peppa's older cousin. Her best friends are Belinda Bear & Simon Squirrel. She wears a yellow dress. Since she is older than the other kids, she does not go to Peppa's playgroup and instead is presumed to go to a different school.
- Baby Alexander (voiced by Oliver May in series 2, Harley Bird in series 3, Minnie Kennedy-Parr since series 4, Alice May (vocals) in series 8, and Penelope Rawlins in Tales) – Alexander is Chloe's baby brother and Peppa's cousin. He was introduced in series 2, and his first word was "puddles", taught to him by Peppa.
- Auntie Dottie Pig (voiced by Cherise Silvestri) – Dottie is Peppa's aunt. She sent a toy horse, which Peppa and George call 'Horsey Twinkle Toes'. She makes her first physical appearance in series 8. She is presumed to be the sister of Mummy Pig and wears a light blue polka-dotted dress and big blue glasses. She lives in another country, likely the US or Canada because of her accent.

== The Rabbits ==
- Rebecca Rabbit (voiced by Hazel Rudd in series 1, Bethan Lindsay in series 2, Alice May in series 3–4, Arisha Choudhary in series 5–8, Sienna Vasir from series 8, and Harriet Carmichael in Tales) – Rebecca is one of Peppa's friends from playgroup. She enjoys carrots very much and sometimes dresses up like one. She wears a sky-blue dress.
- Richard Rabbit (voiced by Zoe Baker in series 2–5, Rohan Boucher since series 6, Fin Templer since series 7, Chloe Dolandis in the US dub, and Penelope Rawlins in Tales) – Richard is Rebecca's younger brother. He loves dinosaurs like his best friend is George and has two toy dinosaurs, one being a red triceratops and the other a purple brontosaurus. He wears a dark blue shirt.
- Miss Rabbit (voiced by Sarah Ann Kennedy in the series and Joanna Ruiz in Tales) – Miss Rabbit is Rebecca's busy aunt. She runs dozens of jobs at the same time, like being a bus driver, supermarket cashier, librarian, helicopter pilot, firefighter, ice cream seller, shoe shop assistant, nurse, ticket seller, and scuba diver, among many others. She wears a yellow dress. There are international versions of Miss Rabbit, as seen in 'America' and 'Peppa Goes To Paris'.
- Mummy Rabbit (voiced by Sarah Ann Kennedy in the series and Penelope Rawlins in Tales) – Mummy Rabbit is Rebecca's mother, and Miss Rabbit's twin sister. She wears a yellow dress.
- Mr. Rabbit (voiced by John Sparkes) – Mr. Rabbit is Mummy Rabbit's husband, Rebecca, Richard, Rosie & Robbie's father and Miss Rabbit's brother-in-law. He works with Daddy Pig and Mummy Cat in a top-floor office. He appears to be a station master, manager of the museum and ice cream seller in some episodes. He is from Wales, a play on Welsh rarebit.
- Big Reggie Rabbit aka Grampy Rabbit (voiced by Brian Blessed) – Grampy Rabbit is Rebecca's grandfather. He can play the banjo and runs a boat yard. He has a very loud voice (an allusion to his voice actor's famously loud and boisterous performances in other media) and often plays songs that the children enjoy but the adults somewhat dislike. His childhood name was 'Little Reggie Rabbit' and he is over 100 years of age.
- Rosie & Robbie Rabbit (voiced by Minnie Kennedy-Parr) – Rosie & Robbie are Rebecca's twin baby siblings. They were born in the episode 'Mummy Rabbit's Bump'. Their names were come up with by Peppa, Rebecca, and their friends.

== The Sheep ==
- Suzy Sheep (voiced by Meg Hall in series 1–4, Ava Lovell in series 5–8, Amber Asmah-Bishop from Series 8, and Elaine Torres in the US dub, and Penelope Rawlins in Tales) – Suzy is Peppa's best friend from playgroup. She wears a pink dress and has a nurse costume.
- Mummy Sheep (voiced by Debbie Macdonald in the series and Penelope Rawlins in Tales) – Mummy Sheep is Suzy's mother who wears a hot pink dress.
- Charlotte Sheep (voiced by Mandeep Dhillon) – Charlotte is Suzy's older cousin. She wears a yellow dress. She was first introduced in the episode 'In The Future'.
- Granny Sheep (voiced by Morwenna Banks in the series and Penelope Rawlins in Tales) – Granny Sheep is Suzy and Charlotte's grandmother, Mummy Sheep's mother. She wears a hot pink dress with flowers on it. She first appeared in 'Dinosaur Party'.

== The Cats ==
- Candy Cat (voiced by Daisy Rudd in series 1, Emma Weston in series 2, Zara Siddiqi in series 3–4, Madison Turner in series 5, Tallulah Conabeare from series 6, and Penelope Rawlins in Tales) – Candy is one of Peppa's friends from playgroup. She wears a turquoise dress and has orange fur.
- Mrs. Cat (voiced by Morwenna Banks in series 2 and 8, Leila Farzad in series 3–4 and Judy Flynn in series 5–7) – Mummy Cat is Candy's mother and a graphic designer at Daddy Pig's job. She wears a light red dress.
- Mr. Cat (voiced by John Sparkes) – Daddy Cat is Candy's father. He wears an indigo shirt and has dark orange fur. He runs a café.

== The Dogs ==
- Danny Dog (voiced by George Woolford in series 1–2, Jadon Mills in series 3–4, Joshua Morris in series 5, Charlie Stewart in series 6-8, George Tompsett since Series 8, Harriet Carmichael in early seasons of Tales, and Penelope Rawlins in later seasons of Tales) – Danny is one of Peppa's friends from playgroup. He likes playing pirates, likely due to his father and grandfather's sailing habits. He wears a purple shirt and has dark brown fur.
- Mummy Dog (voiced by Debbie MacDonald in series 1, Claire Waxler in series 2 and Judy Flynn from series 4) – Mummy Dog is Danny's mother. She once piloted a steamboat.
- Captain Daddy Dog (voiced by Alexander Armstrong) – Captain Dog is Danny's father. He was once a sea captain who journeyed around the world to make his fortune. He made his physical debut in series 4, when he returns home to be with his family. Despite being retired, he occasionally ends up sailing in some episodes.
- Granddad Dog (voiced by David Rintoul in the series and Wayne Forester in Peppa Pig Tales) – Granddad Dog is Danny's grandfather. He is a mechanic and is very good at fixing cars. Even though they sometimes bicker about whose boat is better, he and Grandpa Pig are best friends.
- Granny Dog (voiced by Judy Flynn) – Granny Dog is Danny's grandmother. She made her first appearance as Granny Pig's friend in episode 'Vikings Day'.

== The Ponies ==
- Pedro Pony (voiced by Harrison Oldroyd in series 1–2, Stanley Nickless in series 3–4, Sammy Price in The Golden Boots and Around the World with Peppa, Rohal Soomro in series 5, Robyn Elwell in series 6- and Harriet Carmichael in Tales) – Pedro is one of Peppa's friends from playgroup. He wears black glasses and a yellow shirt. Characterized by his love for sleep, Pedro can be forgetful or clumsy and slow to catch on but is otherwise knowledgeable in his areas of interest and always friendly. In many episodes, he is late for playgroup. He often likes to dress up as a cowboy or a superhero.
- Mummy Pony (voiced by Kate Gribble in series 1, Madeleine May in early series 2, Layla Lewis in late series 2, Jemima Williams in series 3, Leila Farzad in series 4 and Judy Flynn since series 5) – Mummy Pony is Pedro's mother. She wears a yellow dress and contact lenses.
- Dr. Pony (voiced by John Sparkes and Wayne Forester in Peppa Pig Tales) – Daddy Pony is Pedro's father and professionally an optician. He wears glasses and a green shirt.

== The Zebras ==
- Zoë Zebra (voiced by Sian Taylor in series 2–4, Isla Gudgeon in series 5, Georgia Coates since series 6, Tallulah Conabeare since series 7 and Joanna Ruiz in Tales) – Zoë is one of Peppa's friends from playgroup. She wears a purple dress and can play the piano (albeit horribly). She has a toy monkey.
- Mummy Zebra (voiced by Morwenna Banks) – Mummy Zebra is Zoë's mother. She wears a bright green dress and has shown to work with pottery in the episode 'Pottery'. She shares many similarities with Mummy Cow.
- Mr. Zebra (voiced by David Graham) – Mr. Zebra is Zoë's father. He is professionally a postman and can also play the piano.
- Zuzu & Zaza Zebra (voiced by Alice May from series 2–4, Matilda Green since series 5, and Flo Templer since series 7) – Zuzu & Zaza are Zoë's twin sisters. They both wear light lavender dresses.

== The Elephants ==
- Emily Elephant (voiced by Julia Moss in the UK from series 2–4, Stara Bal since series 5, Chloe Dolandis in the US dub, and Penelope Rawlins in Tales) – Emily is one of Peppa's friends from playgroup. She wears a dark yellow dress. She can make the loudest sound out of all the children and often uses her trunk as an extra hand.
- Edmond Elephant (voiced by Jonny Butler from series 3–4, Victor Wade since series 5 and Joanna Ruiz in Tales) – Edmond is Emily's little brother. He wears a dark green shirt. Despite his young age, Edmond is highly intelligent and can speak in full sentences, often calling himself a clever clogs as a result. Edmond is so knowledgeable that he even beats adults in topics of knowledge. Despite this, he too has toddler traits; he has fun, giggles, and cries when unhappy.
- Dr. Elephant (voiced by Andy Hamilton) – Dr. Elephant is Emily's father. He is professionally a dentist and is very smart. He wears a white shirt and a red bow tie.
- Mummy Elephant (voiced by Morwenna Banks) – Mummy Elephant is Emily's mother. She wears a light purple dress.
- Grandma Elephant

== The Foxes ==
- Freddy Fox (voiced by Max Miller in series 3, Jamie Oram from series 4–5, Charlie Stewart from Series 6–7, Teddy Button from Series 8, and Harriet Carmichael in Tales) – Freddy is Peppa's friend from playgroup who has a very good sense of smell. He wears a maroon shirt. He wants to be a policeman when he grows up and often impersonates their sirens loudly.
- Mr. Fox (voiced by John Sparkes) – Mr. Fox is Freddy's father and the owner of a shop and a van that sells literally everything, from rocket engines to cement mixer. The things he sells are usually in boxes of five or matching sets of three.
- Mrs. Fox (voiced by Judy Flynn) – Mrs. Fox is Freddy's mother. She wears a light yellow dress and works as a nurse.

== The Kangaroos ==
- Kylie Kangaroo (voiced by Macey Danger in her first appearance episode and Finley Grieg-Byrne since series 5) – Kylie is Peppa's friend who lives in Australia. Being a kangaroo, she can jump higher than the others. She sometimes goes on picnics with her family and Peppa's family.
- Joey Kangaroo (voiced by Jazlyn Jago since series 5) – Joey is Kylie's little brother. He has a cyan shirt and mostly stays in Mummy Kangaroo's pouch. He has a toy crocodile like how George has a toy dinosaur.
- Mummy Kangaroo aka Mrs. Kangaroo (voiced by Morwenna Banks in Kylie's episode and Elise Grieg since series 5) – Mummy Kangaroo is Kylie's mother. She works as a marine biologist and visits ocean life in a submarine for her job, as seen in the episode 'The Great Barrier Reef'.
- Daddy Kangaroo aka Mr. Kangaroo (voiced by Alexander Armstrong in Kylie's episode and Tony Byrne since series 5) – Daddy Kangaroo is Kylie's father. He likes barbecuing corn on the cob and surfing.

== The Wolves ==
- Wendy Wolf (voiced by Chaniya Mahon in series 4-5 and Eve Ridley since series 6) – Wendy Wolf is one of Peppa's friends from playgroup. She debuted in series 4, after Daddy Pig and Mr. Bull build a house for her family. She also becomes a new student in Peppa's playgroup later in the series. She wears a somewhat darker shade of lilac dress.
- Wyatt Wolf – Wyatt is Wendy's little brother who wears an orange shirt. He is never mentioned in the series.
- Mr. Wolf (voiced by Alexander Armstrong in the series and Wayne Forester in Peppa Pig Tales) – Mr. Wolf is Wendy's father. He sometimes intimidates the pigs about housing materials, a reference to The Three Little Pigs.
- Mrs. Wolf (voiced by Jen Pringle in the series and Harriet Carmichael in Peppa Pig Tales) – Mr. Wolf is Daddy Wolf's wife, Granny Wolf's daughter and Wendy's mother. Like her husband, not much is known about her.
- Granny Wolf (voiced by Jen Pringle) – Granny Wolf is Mummy Wolf's mother, Daddy Wolf's mother-in-law and Wendy and Wyatt's grandmother. She made her first appearance in the episode 'Wendy Wolf's Birthday'.

== The Goats ==
- Gabriella Goat (voiced by Sonia Arapi) – Gabriella is Peppa's friend from Italy. She has white fur and wears a turquoise dress.
- Signor Goat (voiced by Andrea Tran) – Signor is Gabriella's father and the caretaker of a holiday house in Italy.
- Uncle Goat (voiced by John Sparkes) – Uncle Goat is Gabriella's uncle and a pizza baker in Gabriella's village.
- Auntie Goat (voiced by Morwenna Banks) – Auntie Goat is Gabriella's aunt who runs a store in Gabriella's village.

== The Giraffes ==
- Gerald Giraffe (voiced by Leo Templer in series 5-7, Dexter Varrall since series 8, Harriet Carmichael in early seasons of Tales, and Joanna Ruiz in later seasons of Tales) – Gerald Giraffe is one of Peppa's friends from playgroup. He is the tallest kid in the playgroup as he is a giraffe.
- Mr. Giraffe (voiced by Zeus Jahn-Vilnur) – Mr. Giraffe is Gerald's father who works as a zookeeper and is responsible for looking after butterflies, as seen in the episode 'The Zoo'. He is the tallest character in the series.
- Mrs. Giraffe (voiced by Posher Ra Ra) – Mummy Giraffe is Gerald's mother. She is the tallest mother in the series, although she is not as tall as her husband.

== The Moles ==
- Molly Mole (voiced by Rosie van Hulzen) – Molly is one of Peppa's friends from playgroup. She has dark gray fur and wears a purple dress and blue glasses. She is very good at digging and lives underneath Rebecca's house.
- Mummy Mole aka Mrs. Mole (voiced by Jen Pringle) – Mummy Mole is Molly's mother.
- Daddy Mole aka Mr. Mole (voiced by John Sparkes) – Daddy Mole is Molly's father.

== The Bears ==
- Dr. Brown Bear (voiced by David Rintoul) – Dr. Brown Bear is a doctor. He claims to never get sick, although he has once. According to the British Medical Journal, Dr. Brown Bear shows clear signs of 'burnout' and begins falling short of the high standards of service he aims to provide to his patients, which include 'prompt and direct telephone access, continuity of care, extended hours, and a low threshold for home visits'.
- Baby Bear – Baby Bear is a character in Peppa's bedtime story for George in the episode 'The Bedtime Story'. He wears a yellow shirt.

=== Belinda's Family ===
- Belinda Bear (voiced by Zara Siddiqi in series 3 and Charlotte Potterton since series 5) – Belinda is Chloe Pig's friend. She calls herself 'Bea' for short. She wears pink glasses and a striped red and black dress.
- Daddy Bear (voiced by John Sparkes) – Daddy Bear is Belinda's father.
- Mummy Bear (voiced by Morwenna Banks) – Mummy Bear is Belinda's mother. She wears a purple dress.

=== Birgit's Family ===
- Birgit Bear (voiced by Ingrid Fridlund) – Birgit is one of Peppa's friends who first appeared in 'Caravan Friends'. She wears a purple dress and a yellow hat with a daisy on it.
- Daddy Bear (voiced by Mark Luciani-Pedersen) – Daddy Bear is Birgit's father. He wears a red and white flower patterned shirt, blue pants, and a greenish gray and white hat.
- Mummy Bear (voiced by Pernille Lyneborg) – Mummy Bear is Birgit's mother. She wears a violet dress and yellow glasses.

=== Penny's Family ===
- Penny the Polar Bear (voiced by Mabel Green) – Penny is one of Peppa's friends from playgroup who has two mothers, the first LGBTQ+ characters in the show.
- Dr. Polar Bear (voiced by Jen Pringle in the series and Penelope Rawlins in Peppa Pig Tales) – Dr. Polar Bear is a pediatrics doctor and one of Penny's two mothers. She is LGTBQ+, like her wife.
- Mummy Polar Bear (voiced by Judy Flynn) – Mummy Polar Bear is a homemaker and the other of Penny's two mothers. She is LGTBQ+, like her wife.

== The Donkeys ==
- Delphine Donkey (voiced by Nzilani Franq and Penelope Rawlins in Peppa Pig Tales) – Delphine is Peppa's penpal from France. As such, French is her native language, but she can also speak English. She has gray fur and wears a purple dress.
- Didier Donkey (voiced by Aurélie Charbonnier) – Didier is Delphine's little brother. He wears an orange shirt and has a toy dragon, similar to how George has a toy dinosaur.
- Monsieur Donkey (voiced by Jerome Haupert in series 2-3 and David Rintoul since series 5) – Monsieur is Delphine's father. He wears a blue shirt and has a moustache.
- Mummy Donkey aka Mrs. Donkey – Mummy Donkey is Delphine's mother. She wears a yellow dress.

== The Pandas ==
- Peggy and Pandora Panda (voiced by Chelsey Orfinada in season 6 and Evelyn Fung since series 8) – Peggy and Pandora are identical twin twins and Peppa's friends from playgroup. They enjoy puzzles and games that require investigating or solving a mystery due to their father's work. Pandora wears a dark yellow dress and Peggi wears a red dress.
- Police Officer Panda (voiced by David Mitchell and Wayne Forester in Peppa Pig Tales) – Police Officer Panda is Peggy and Pandora's father who is a talented but somewhat clumsy policeman. He usually says 'Ello, Ello, Ello!' when he greets people. He enjoys eating doughnuts and works with Police Officer Squirrel.
- Mummy Panda (voiced by Morwenna Banks) – Mummy Panda is Peggi and Pandora's mother. She wears a light pink dress and is a firefighter.

== The Squirrels ==
- Simon Squirrel (voiced by Preston Nyman in series 3, Otto Hall in series 7 and Kieran Vasir from series 8) – Simon is Chloe's friend. He calls himself 'Si' for short. He has orange fur and wears an indigo shirt.
- Police Officer Squirrel (voiced by Judy Flynn) – Police Officer Squirrel is a police officer She enjoys eating doughnuts and works with Police Officer Panda.

== The Mice ==
- Mandy Mouse (voiced by Audrey van Hulzen and Penelope Rawlins in Peppa Pig Tales) – Mandy is one of Peppa's friends from playgroup. She has beige fur and wears a rose dress. She uses a wheelchair to get around.
- Mummy Mouse (voiced by Morwenna Banks) – Mummy Mouse is Mandy's mother. She wears a purple shirt.
- Daddy Mouse (voiced by John Sparkes) – Daddy Mouse is Mandy Mouse's father. He wears an indigo shirt.

== The Gazelles ==
- Madame Gigi Gazelle (voiced by Morwenna Banks in the series, Nanique Gheridan in the US dub, and Harriet Carmichael in Tales) – Madame Gazelle is the teacher at and owner of Peppa's playgroup. She has a French accent and plays in a rock band called 'The Rocking Gazelles' with her sisters. In the episode 'Pumpkin Party' it is implied that she is a vampire because she has no reflection in the mirror, and seeing Suzy dressed as a vampire reminds her of the old country. She can play both electric and acoustic guitars, as shown in many episodes.
- Glenda Gazelle (voiced by Morwenna Banks – Glenda is the bass guitarist in 'The Rocking Gazelles'. She wears a white and blue checkered dress.
- Greta Gazelle (voiced by Morwenna Banks – Greta is the drummer in Madame Gazelle's rock band 'The Rocking Gazelles'. She wears a white and red checkered dress.

== The Cattle ==
- Mr. Bull (voiced by David Rintoul and Wayne Forester in Peppa Pig Tales) – Mr. Bull is a garbage man and a construction worker. He wears a maroon shirt and a yellow vest for construction. His favorite job is digging up the road.
- Mrs. Cow (voiced by Judy Flynn) – Mrs. Cow is Mr. Bull's wife and works as a firefighter.
- Grandma Cow (voiced by Morwenna Banks) – Grandma Cow works for a charity shop.
- Carol Cow – Carol Cow is a calf. She wears a light blue dress.

== The Badgers ==
- Mr. Badger (voiced by Sam Simmons) – Mr. Badger is the husband of Mrs. Badger. He wears a dark bottle green shirt with a red tie and a dark lime green hat. He works at a potato field next to Potato City.
- Mrs. Badger (voiced by Morwenna Banks) – Mrs. Badger is the wife of Mr. Badger. She lives in a farm, along with chickens and guinea pigs. She wears a red spotted bandana on her neck, a green plaid button-up coat, along with a light blue dress and dark pink boots.

== The Rhinoceroses ==
- Rohan Rhino (voiced by Giaan Virdee) – Rohan is one of Peppa's friends who debuted in the episode "Cruise Ship Holiday". He wears a light green shirt. He moved to Peppa's town in the episode "Moving Day".
- Rajiv Rhino (voiced by Nihal Raj) – Rajiv is Rohan's older brother. He wears a blue shirt.
- Mrs. Rhino (voiced by Lori Alan) – Mrs. Rhino is Rohan's mother. She wears a light pink dress.
- Grandpa Rhino (voiced by Sam Simmons) – Grandpa Rhino is presumably Rohan's grandfather. He wears a greenish brown shirt. His name is credited as 'Elderly Rhinoceros'.
- Mr. Rhino (voiced by John Sparkes) – Mr. Rhino is a construction worker and Rohan's father.

== The Lions ==
- Mr. Lion (voiced by Colin McFarlane) – Mr. Lion appears in the episode 'The Zoo' as the primary zookeeper. He calls Madame Gazelle 'Mrs. Wildebeest' and often intimidates her, since both are natural prey to lions.
- Larenzo Lion (voiced by John King) – Larenzo is Mummy Lion and Mr. Lion's son. His parents are divorced, so he lives part time with his father at the zoo and part time with his mother.
- Mummy Lion (voiced by Judy Flynn)– Mummy Lion is Larenzo's mother. Larenzo sometimes stays at her house.
- Leo Lion – Leo Lion was Suzy Sheep's imaginary friend in the episode "Pretend Friend".

== Other characters ==
- Mr. Potato (voiced by John Sparkes) – Mr. Potato is an anthropomorphic potato celebrity. He encourages kids to exercise and eat healthy. His friends are Mrs. Carrot, Sweet Cranberry and Little Sprout who are also real fruit and vegetables.
- Mademoiselle Potato (voiced by Morwenna Banks) – Mademoiselle Potato is presumably a co-worker or the wife of Mr. Potato.
- Super Potato (voiced by Alexander Armstrong and Wayne Forester in Peppa Pig Tales) – Super Potato is a fictional TV superhero which Peppa and her friends watch unsure if he is real or someone wearing a costume. He also gives the kids good health advice. He likes to sing, 'Fruits and vegetables keep us alive, always remember to eat your five', referring to the amount of servings of fruit and vegetables that were previously recommended (the number is now seven, as one of the children will inevitably remind Super Potato, who corrects himself).
- Mrs. Carrot (voiced by Morwenna Banks) – Mrs. Carrot appears as a member of the Christmas Vegetable Family alongside Mr. Potato, Sweet Cranberry and Little Sprout, in the episode 'Mr. Potato's Christmas Show' and also appears in the episode 'Fruit'.
- Little Sprout (voiced by Philippa Prosser) – Little Sprout appears as a member of the Christmas Vegetable Family in the episode 'Mr. Potato's Christmas Show' and also appears in the episode 'Fruit'.
- Sweet Cranberry – Sweet Cranberry appears as a member of the Christmas Vegetable Family in the episode 'Mr. Potato's Christmas Show' and also appears in the episode 'Fruit'.
- Dr. Hamster (voiced by Morwenna Banks) – Dr. Hamster is a vet and has a tortoise named Tiddles who gets stuck in trees a lot. She flies an airplane on 'The Flying Vet'.
- Mr. Labrador (voiced by David Graham in series 3–5 and Al Murray since series 6) – Mr. Labrador works with Mr. Bull in the building/construction jobs. He also runs the archery competition at the fair (as seen in Funfair) and sells Ice Cream in his van.
- Captain Emergency (voiced by Dominic Byrne) – Captain Emergency is the pilot on the plane Peppa and her family fly on in the episode 'Flying on Holiday'.
- Policeman Stag (voiced by Fernando Tiberini) – Policeman Stag appears in the episodes 'The Holiday House', 'Holiday in the Sun' and 'The End of the Holiday' to return Teddy to Peppa who kept losing it. He is a dark brown otter.
- Father Christmas (voiced by David Graham, but credited as 'himself' and Wayne Forester in Peppa Pig Tales) – Father Christmas appears in episodes 'Santa's Grotto', 'Santa's Visit', 'Mr. Potato's Christmas Show' and 'Father Christmas. He is one of 3 human characters in the show, the other ones are the Queen and the pirate Dog Beard. He is alternatively referred to as Father Christmas and Santa.
- The Queen (voiced by Morwenna Banks) – The Queen appeared in the episodes 'The Queen' and 'London'. She was based on the real Queen Elizabeth II of the United Kingdom. She awarded Miss Rabbit as the hardest working woman in the country. The character has been retired due to Queen Elizabeth's death.
- Mrs. Crocodile (voiced by Jo Brand) – Mrs. Crocodile is a zookeeper primarily responsible for the penguins. She is also a good swimmer.
- Mr. Wallaby (voiced by Sam Simmons) – Mr. Wallaby is the Kangaroos' neighbor, who is described as very nice.
- Mr. Stallion (voiced by John Sparkes) – Mr. Stallion is Grandpa Pig's friend. He is a gray horse.
- Mrs. Corgi (voiced by Morwenna Banks) – Mrs. Corgi is Grandpa Pig's friend. She is a corgi dog.
- King Alfonso (voiced by David Graham) – King Alfonso is a king.
- Mr. Hyrax – Mr. Hyrax runns the sailing club's clubhouse, and is a guard outside of a TV studio and a waiter at a fancy restaurant.

== Pets and animals ==
- Goldie the Fish – Goldie is Peppa's pet fish.
- Ginger the Fish – Ginger is Miss Rabbit's pet fish and is Goldie's friend.
- Tiddles – Tiddles is Dr. Hamster's pet tortoise. He is 33 as shown the episode 'Dr. Hamster's Tortoise'. He is known to climb trees as shown in 'Doctor Hamster's Tortoise' and often sneak away from Dr. Hamster.
- Steven – Steven is Pedro Pony's pet stick insect.
- Jemima, Sarah, Vanessa & Neville – They are Granny and Grandpa Pig's chickens. In the episode 'Spring', they have three chicks.
- Hemidactylus Frenatus – He is Edmond's pet gecko named after the scientific name of the common house gecko.
- Polly Parrot (voiced by Alison Snowden) – Polly is Granny and Grandpa Pig's pet parrot. Like most parrots, Polly copies what others say.
- Mrs. Duck – Mrs. Duck is a wild duck who lives in the duck pond with the other ducks. She and her fellow ducks have a habit of always showing up at picnics, usually in the hope of receiving food scraps, and often appears in unusual places to reach the picnic, such as the top of a mountain. She appears in the episode 'The Golden Boots" special when she takes Peppa's golden boots.
- Mrs. Duck-Billed Platypus – Mrs. Duck-Billed Platypus is a wild duck-billed platypus who appears in the episode 'The Outback'. She appears when Peppa and her family are having a barbecue picnic with the Kangaroo family in the Australian Outback, after Peppa remarks that Mrs. Duck always shows up when they have picnics.
- Mr. Skinnylegs – Mr. Skinnylegs is a friendly little spider who lives in and around Peppa's house, at times covering the place with his cobwebs. He was named by Peppa as he has long legs.

== Voice actors ==
Character	Voice actor
Peppa Pig	Lily Snowden Fine (series 1)
Peppa Pig	Cecily Bloom (series 2)
Peppa Pig	Harley Bird ("Peppa's Christmas", series 3 – 6)
Peppa Pig	Amelie Bea Smith (series 6 – 8)
Peppa Pig	Harriette Cox (series 8 – present)
George Pig	Alice May (series 1 – present, vocal effects)
George Pig	Oliver May (series 1 – 5, speaking lines)
George Pig	Vincent van Hulzen (series 6 – 7, speaking lines)
George Pig	Kira Monteith (series 8 – present, speaking lines)
Mummy Pig	Morwenna Banks
Granny Sheep	Morwenna Banks
Mummy Zebra	Morwenna Banks
Mummy Elephant	Morwenna Banks
Auntie Goat	Morwenna Banks
Mummy Bear	Morwenna Banks
Mummy Panda	Morwenna Banks
Mummy Mouse	Morwenna Banks
Madame Gazelle	Morwenna Banks
Mrs. Carrot	Morwenna Banks
Dr. Hamster	Morwenna Banks
The Queen	Morwenna Banks
Mrs. Corgi	Morwenna Banks
Daddy Pig	Richard Ridings
Grandpa Pig	David Graham
Mr Zebra	David Graham
Father Christmas	David Graham
King Alfonso	David Graham
Granny Pig	Frances White
Narrator	John Sparkes
Uncle Pig	John Sparkes
Mr Rabbit	John Sparkes
Mr Cat	John Sparkes
Dr. Pony	John Sparkes
Mr. Fox	John Sparkes
Uncle Goat	John Sparkes
Mr. Mole	John Sparkes
Daddy Mouse	John Sparkes
Mr. Potato	John Sparkes
Mr. Rhinoceros	John Sparkes
Mr. Stallion	John Sparkes
Auntie Pig	Alison Snowden (series 1 – 2)
Auntie Pig	Judy Flynn (series 3 – 4, 6)
Chloe Pig	Eloise May (series 1 – 2)
Chloe Pig	Abigail Daniels (series 3)
Chloe Pig	Zara Siddiqi (series 4)
Chloe Pig	Charlotte Potterson (series 6)
Baby Alexander	Oliver May (series 2)
Baby Alexander	Harley Bird (series 3)
Baby Alexander	Minnie Kennedy-Parr (series 4 – present)
Rebecca Rabbit	Hazel Rudd (series 1)
Rebecca Rabbit	Bethan Lindsay (series 2)
Rebecca Rabbit	Alice May (series 3 – 4)
Rebecca Rabbit	Arisha Choudhary (series 5 – present)
Richard Rabbit	Zoe Baker (series 2 – 5)
Richard Rabbit	Rohan Boucher (series 6 – present)
Richard Rabbit	Fin Templer (series 7 – present)
Miss Rabbit	Sarah Ann Kennedy
Mummy Rabbit	Sarah Ann Kennedy
Mademoiselle Lapin	Sarah Ann Kennedy
Grampy Rabbit	Brian Blessed
Rosie & Robbie Rabbit	Minnie Kennedy-Parr
Suzy Sheep	Meg Hall (series 1 – 4)
Suzy Sheep	Ava Lovell (series 5 – present)
Mrs Sheep	Debbie MacDonald
Charlotte Sheep	Mandeep Dhillon
Candy Cat	Daisy Rudd (series 1)
Candy Cat	Emma Weston (series 2)
Candy Cat	Zara Siddiqi (series 3 – 4)
Candy Cat	Madison Turner (series 5)
Candy Cat	Tallulah Conabeare (series 6 – present)
Mrs Cat	Morwenna Banks (series 2)
Mrs Cat	Leila Farzad (series 3 – 4)
Mrs Cat	Judy Flynn (series 5 – present)
Danny Dog	George Woolford (series 1 – 2)
Danny Dog	Jadon Mills (series 3 – 4)
Danny Dog	Joshua Morris (series 5)
Danny Dog	Charlie Stewart (series 6 – present)
Mummy Dog	Debbie MacDonald (series 1)
Mummy Dog	Claire Waxler (series 2)
Mummy Dog	Judy Flynn (series 4 – 6)
Granddad Dog	David Rintoul
Dr. Brown Bear	David Rintoul
Mr. Bull	David Rintoul
Captain Dog	Alexander Armstrong
Mr. Wolf	Alexander Armstrong
Super Potato	Alexander Armstrong
Granny Dog	Judy Flynn
Mummy Fox	Judy Flynn
Police Officer Squirrel	Judy Flynn
Mrs. Cow	Judy Flynn
Pedro Pony	Harrison Oldroyd (series 1 – 2)
Pedro Pony	Stanley Nickless (series 3 – 4)
Pedro Pony	Sammy Price (The Golden Boots & Around the World with Peppa)
Pedro Pony	Rohal Soomro (series 5)
Pedro Pony	Robyn Elwell (series 5 – present)
Mrs Pony	Kate Gribble (series 1)
Mrs Pony	Madeleine May (series 2)
Mrs Pony	Layla Lewis (series 2)
Mrs Pony	Jemima Williams (series 3)
Mrs Pony	Leila Farzad (series 4)
Mrs Pony	Judy Flynn (series 5 – present)
Zoe Zebra	Sian Taylor (series 2 – 4)
Zoe Zebra	Isla Gudgeon (series 5)
Zoe Zebra	Georgia Coates (series 6 – present)
Zoe Zebra	Tallulah Conabeare (series 7 – present)
Zuzu and Zaza Zebra	Alice May (series 2 – 4)
Zuzu and Zaza Zebra	Matilda Green (series 5 – present)
Zuzu and Zaza Zebra	Flo Temper (series 7 -present)
Emily Elephant	Julia Moss (series 2 – 4)
Emily Elephant	Stara Bal (series 5 – present)
Edmond Elephant	Jonny Butler (series 3 – 4)
Edmond Elephant	Victor Wade (series 5 – present)
Dr. Elephant	Andy Hamilton
Freddy Fox	Jamie Oram (series 3 – 5)
Freddy Fox	Charlie Stewart (series 6 – present)
Kylie Kangaroo	Macey Danger (series 4)
Kylie Kangaroo	Finley Grieg-Byrne (series 5 – present)
Joey Kangaroo	Jazlyn Jago (series 5 – present)
Mrs. Kangaroo	Morwenna Banks (series 4)
Mrs. Kangaroo	Elise Grieg (series 5 – present)
Mr. Kangaroo	Alexander Armstrong (series 4)
Mr. Kangaroo	Tony Byrne (series 5 – present)
Wendy Wolf	Chaniya Mahon (series 4 – 5)
Wendy Wolf	Eve Ridley (series 6 – present)
Mrs. Wolf	Jen Pringle
Granny Wolf	Jen Pringle
Mrs. Mole	Jen Pringle
Gabriella Goat	Sonia Arapi
Signor Goat	Andrea Tran
Gerald Giraffe	Leo Templer
Mr. Giraffe	Zeus Jahn-Vilnur
Mummy Giraffe	Posher Ra Ra
Molly Mole	Rosie van Hulzen
Belinda Bear	Zara Siddiqi (series 3)
Belinda Bear	Charlotte Potterson (series 5 – present)
Penny Polar Bear	Mabel Green
Delphine Donkey	Nzilani Franq
Didier Donkey	Aurélie Charbonnier
Monsieur Donkey	Jerome Haupert (series 2 – 3)
Monsieur Donkey	David Rintoul (series 5 – present)
Police Officer Panda	David Mitchell
Peggi and Pandora Panda	Chelsey Orfinada (series 6)
Peggi and Pandora Panda	Evelyn Fung (series 8)
Simon Squirrel	Preston Nyman (series 3)
Simon Squirrel	Otto Hall (series 7 – present)
Mandy Mouse	Audrey van Hulzen
Little Sprout	Phillipa Prosser
Mr. Labrador	David Graham (series 3 – 5)
Mr. Labrador	Al Murray
Captain Emergency	Dominic Byrne
Policeman Stag	Fernando Tiberini
Mr. Lion	Colin McFarlane
Mrs. Crocodile	Jo Brand
Mr. Wallaby	Sam Simmons
Polly Parrot	Alison Snowden
