= Peppa's Adventures: The Album =

Second studio album from the TV programme Peppa Pig

Studio album by Peppa Pig
- Released: 30 July 2021
- Length: 24:46
- Label: eOne
- Producer: Paul Moessl

Peppa Pig chronology
| My First Album (2019) | Peppa's Adventures: The Album (2021) | Peppa's Club: The Album (2022) |

Singles from Peppa's Adventures: The Album
- 1. "Bing Bong Champion" Released: 11 June 2021; 2. "Peppa's Adventures" Released: 2 July 2021

Peppa's Adventures: The Album is the second studio album from the British television programme Peppa Pig. It was released by eOne Music on 30 July 2021, preceded by the singles "Bing Bong Champion" and "Peppa's Adventures".

== Background ==
"Bing Bong Champion" was released as the album's lead single on 11 June 2021, with eOne Music announcing the release of Peppa's Adventures: The Album on the same day, to contain "10 all-new songs". The single was followed up by the release of "Peppa's Adventures" on 2 July 2021. All songs on the album were performed by Peppa Pig's voice actor, Amelie Bea Smith, 10 years old at the time of the album's release.

== Reception ==
Professional ratings
Review scores
| Source | Rating |
|---|---|
| Pitchfork | 6.5/10 |

Writing for Pitchfork, Peyton Thomas called the album a "self-assured celebration of family, friendship, and muddy puddles". Thomas wrote that "Recycling" was reminiscent of Fiona Apple's work, and that both "The School Bus Song" and "Winter Days" introduce elements of "British and American folk music" to the album. However, Thomas opined that "Peppa's Adventures is most compelling when Peppa departs from her standard chamber-pop formula", citing "Bing Bong Champion" as "ambitiously maximalist" and "among her best work to date", comparing it to Taylor Swift's "State of Grace".

The official Peppa Pig X (formerly Twitter) account later responded to the Pitchfork review, gloating that the publication gave the album a higher score than Donda by Kanye West, which received a 6.0/10. The tweet was deleted shortly thereafter but received attention from fans. Journalists such as Evan Qiang of 34th Street criticized Pitchfork for giving Peppa's Adventures a better score than other "artists who worked hard on their albums", such as Lana Del Rey with Born to Die and Nine Inch Nails with The Fragile.

In the years following its release, the album has retained significant notoriety on Stan Twitter, particularly for its aforementioned Pitchfork rating of 6.5, which is commonly used mockingly by users in comparison to new albums that score similarly or lower.

== Track listing ==
Credits adapted from Tidal. All tracks are produced by Paul Moessl.

| No. | Title | Writer(s) | Length |
|---|---|---|---|
| 1. | "Peppa's Adventures" | Paul Moessl; Clare Myres | 2:46 |
| 2. | "Perfect Day" | Moessl; Clare Bradley | 2:37 |
| 3. | "Birdy Birdy Woof Woof" | Julian Nott | 1:59 |
| 4. | "Recycling" | Nott | 2:27 |
| 5. | "Bing Bong Champion" | Moessl; Bradley | 3:42 |
| 6. | "The School Bus Song" | Moessl; Bradley | 3:14 |
| 7. | "Digging with Mr. Bull" | Moessl; Bradley | 2:53 |
| 8. | "Winter Days" | Moessl; Bradley | 2:42 |
| 9. | "North Star Lullaby" | Nott | 2:26 |
| Total length: | | | 24:46 |

== Release history ==
| Territory | Date | Format(s) | Ref. |
|---|---|---|---|
| Various | 30 July 2021 | Digital download; streaming | |
