= Penny the Polar Bear =

Peppa Pig character

- Peppa Pig character
- Penny the Polar Bear
- First appearance: "Undersea Party"
- Created by: Astley Baker Davies
- Voiced by: Mabel Green

In-universe information
- Species: Polar bear
- Family: Mummy Polar Bear, Doctor Polar Bear
- Relatives: Grandpa Polar Bear
- Home: Peppatown

Penny the Polar Bear is a character on British preschool animated children's television series Peppa Pig. She has two mothers, who are a lesbian couple.

Her debut episode "Families" has been compared to Arthur's "Mr. Ratburn and the Special Someone", and Peppa Pig's depiction of her family has been compared to LGBTQ representation in Steven Universe, My Little Pony: Friendship Is Magic, Adventure Time and Doc McStuffins. Italian politician Federico Mollicone called for Radiotelevisione italiana (RAI) to pull the episode, and a speech in the Russian Federal Assembly called her family "LGBT propaganda" and a "tool of hybrid war".

== Production ==
Penny's family eating spaghetti in their home. From right to left; Doctor Polar Bear, Penny the Polar Bear, and Mummy Polar Bear

In 2019, Beth G and Lacey K set up a Care2 petition calling for a same-sex parent family on Peppa Pig. The petition gained almost 24,000 signatures. (Note: The petition did not reach its goal of 25,000 signatures, but is marked as successful on Care2.)

Penny and her family (Note: Doctor Polar Bear first appeared in Health Check.) were introduced in the episode Undersea Party, but her mothers' relationship status was first clarified in Families, which first aired on Channel 5 on 6 September 2022. In the episode, Peppa Pig and her friends draw their families, and the characters learn about each other's families. In the episode, Penny draws her family eating spaghetti and says, "I live with my mommy and my other mommy. One mommy is a doctor and one mommy cooks spaghetti" [sic]. Her parents are called Mummy Polar Bear and Doctor Polar Bear. They are a lesbian couple. After Families, Peppa Pig began trending on X (formerly Twitter).

== Reception ==
The BBC, The Washington Post, and PinkNews compared Peppa Pig's depiction of a same-sex relationship to the 2019 Arthur episode "Mr. Ratburn and the Special Someone". The Washington Post also compared the two mothers to lesbian couples in My Little Pony: Friendship Is Magic and Doc McStuffins, and compared the couple's reception to the reactions to Lightyear's lesbian kiss. The BBC noted that Adventure Time and Steven Universe were other cartoons that depicted same sex relationships. Director of Communications and External Affairs at Stonewall, Robbie de Santos, praised the episode, saying that people with same-sex parents would feel meaningfully represented, and called the episode fantastic. In their article about Penny, The Guardian noted Peppa Pig's previous criticisms over featuring a nuclear family that perpetuates gender stereotypes (Note: Mummy Pig staying at home while Daddy Pig goes to work.), and criticism from the London Fire Brigade over using the term "fireman" instead of "firefighter".

PinkNews mentioned that before the petition, Norman Lamb also called for queer characters in shows like Peppa Pig. PinkNews also noted that Peppa Pig had included LGBTQ themes before on the song "Rainbow, Rainbow" from Peppa Pig's My First Album. Heather Hogan of Autostraddle noted that the addition of lesbian characters late into the show's run was surprising, as cartoons without a queer character in the first few seasons rarely debut a queer character. She also noted that Peppa Pig opted to explicitly confirm the character's queerness in the show instead of confirming it on social media or in an interview.

Italian politician and culture spokesperson for the Brothers of Italy, Federico Mollicone, called for the Italian broadcaster RAI (Note: RAI owns the rights to Peppa Pig in Italy.) to not broadcast Families for its depiction of an LGBTQ relationship. Mollicone called the episode gender indoctrination and politically correct, saying "Can't children just be children?" [sic]. Mollicane also called for the traditional family to be protected. During a speech decrying LGBTQ media, member of the Russian Federal Assembly, Alexander Khinshtein, cited Families' depiction of Penny and her family as an example of LGBT propaganda. The American Family Association's One Million Moms circulated a petition calling for Hasbro (Note: Hasbro owns the rights to Peppa Pig) to "stick to entertaining and providing family-friendly programming instead of pushing an agenda", considering the family to be "boldly glorifying gay marriage".
