= How I Live Now (film) =

2013 romantic speculative drama film

- UK poster
- Directed by: Kevin Macdonald
- Screenplay by: Jeremy Brock; Tony Grisoni; Penelope Skinner
- Based on: How I Live Now by Meg Rosoff
- Produced by: John Battsek; Alasdair Flind; Andrew Ruhemann; Charles Steel
- Starring: Saoirse Ronan; George MacKay; Tom Holland; Harley Bird; Anna Chancellor
- Cinematography: Franz Lustig
- Edited by: Jinx Godfrey
- Music by: Jon Hopkins
- Production companies: Film4; BFI; Cowboy Films; Passion Pictures; Protagonist Pictures; Prospect Entertainment
- Distributed by: Entertainment One
- Release dates: September 2013 (TIFF); 4 October 2013 (UK)
- Running time: 101 minutes
- Countries: Canada; United Kingdom
- Language: English
- Budget: $1 million
- Box office: $1 million

How I Live Now is a 2013 romantic speculative drama film based on the 2004 novel of the same name by Meg Rosoff. It was directed by Kevin Macdonald, written by Tony Grisoni, Jeremy Brock, and Penelope Skinner, and stars Saoirse Ronan, George MacKay, Tom Holland, Harley Bird, Anna Chancellor, and Corey Johnson. The film centres around American teenager Daisy (Ronan) and her British cousins Eddie (MacKay), Isaac (Holland), and Piper (Bird), as they try to reunite during an apocalyptic nuclear war.

The film premiered at the 2013 Toronto International Film Festival and received mixed reviews, with some critics positively comparing Ronan's role to Jennifer Lawrence's role as Katniss Everdeen in The Hunger Games. The film was nominated for multiple awards across various categories, including Ronan being nominated for a British Independent Film Award and a Saturn Award. Macdonald, MacKay, and Bird also received various nominations.

== Plot ==
Sometime in the future, Elizabeth 'Daisy' Rybeck, an irritable, neurotic American teenager, is sent by her father David to the English countryside for the summer to stay with her Aunt Penn and her three cousins: Eddie, Isaac, and Piper. Daisy arrives at Heathrow Airport to tightened security and reports of a bombing in Paris and is greeted by Isaac, who drives her to their farm. Daisy remains abrasive towards her cousins and their neighbour's son, Joe. She learns from her aunt that her late mother Julia, who died in childbirth, also used to stay at the farm frequently. Shortly after her arrival, Aunt Penn flies to Geneva to attend an emergency conference because she is an expert in terrorist extremist groups. Meanwhile, Daisy begins falling in love with her eldest cousin, Eddie.

The children's summer fun ends when terrorists detonate a nuclear bomb in London that kills tens of thousands. Soon the electricity goes out and they learn from an emergency radio broadcast that martial law has been imposed. An American consular official offers Daisy safe passage home but she decides to stay, set upon her love for Eddie. Later on, a group of soldiers attack their home and forcibly separate the boys and girls, who are to be evacuated to separate parts of the country. Eddie tries to fight back but is pinned down by the soldiers. He calls for Daisy to return to the farm whenever she can.

Daisy and Piper are fostered in the home of a military officer and his wife and assigned to work on a farm. When the area is attacked by terrorists, Joe, who is working on the same farm, is killed. The two girls escape to the countryside and begin a days-long walk back to their home. Daisy witnesses the mistreatment of captives and later the aftermath of a massacre near the camp where Isaac and Eddie were taken. She does not find Eddie among the dead, but she does find Isaac's body. She mournfully takes his glasses and buries them. Two armed men chase the girls through the woods, but Daisy shoots them both and the girls flee.

Later, the girls are on the verge of giving up when they see Eddie's pet hawk fly overhead and follow it back home. They discover that the military troops stationed there have been massacred and the house is empty. Only their dog remains. The next morning, Daisy follows the dog into the woods, where she finds Eddie lying unconscious, his face and hands scarred and his eyes swollen shut. In the aftermath of the war, Daisy nurses Eddie. A ceasefire is announced, electricity is restored, a new government forms, and the country begins to recover.

Sometime later, Eddie is mute and has post-traumatic stress disorder. Daisy promises to be there for him, hoping that he will recover.

== Cast ==
- Saoirse Ronan as Daisy
- George MacKay as Eddie
- Tom Holland as Isaac
- Harley Bird as Piper
- Anna Chancellor as Aunt Penn
- Danny McEvoy as Joe
- Corey Johnson as Consular official
- Darren Morfitt as the Sergeant
- Jonathan Rugman as the News Reporter
- Stella Gonet as Mrs McEvoy
- Des McAleer as Major McEvoy

== Production ==
The film was produced by Cowboy Films (which has also produced Kevin Macdonald's The Last King of Scotland and Black Sea) and Passion Pictures, with support from Film4 and BFI. Filming began in June 2012 in England and Wales. Macdonald said of the film:

It's quite a dark, little film. It was designed, financially, to be with no name actors at all. [Ronan] so wanted to do it and I met her, she was so fantastic, and so right in age. Everybody else in this will be unknown, never having acted before. It's all kids. Two or three adult scenes, but all the main characters are kids.

== Release ==
How I Live Now premiered at the 2013 Toronto International Film Festival. The film was released on 4 October 2013 in the United Kingdom and was set for release on 28 November 2013 in Australia. On 25 July 2013, Magnolia Pictures acquired the US rights to distribute the film.

== Reception ==
=== Critical reception ===
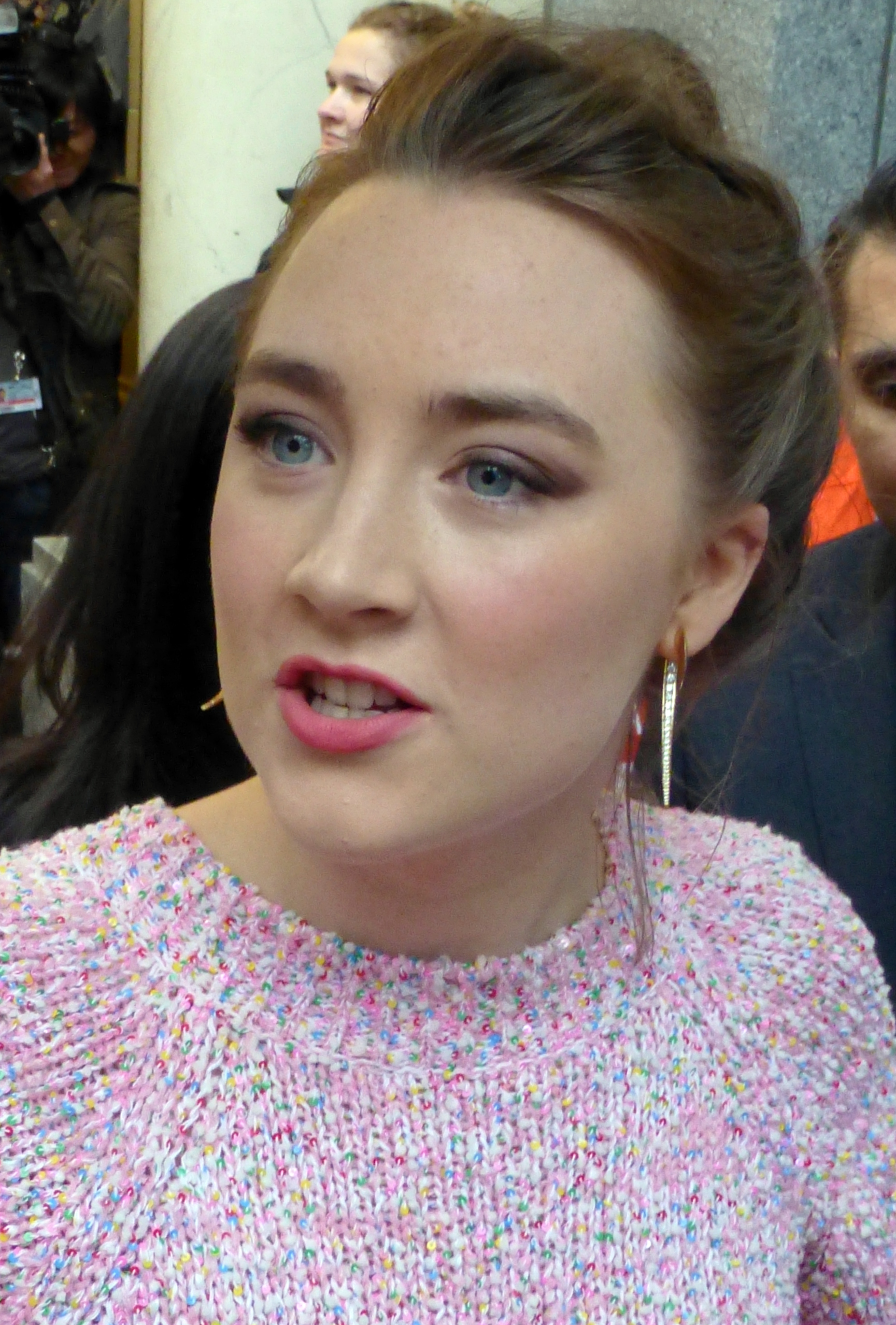
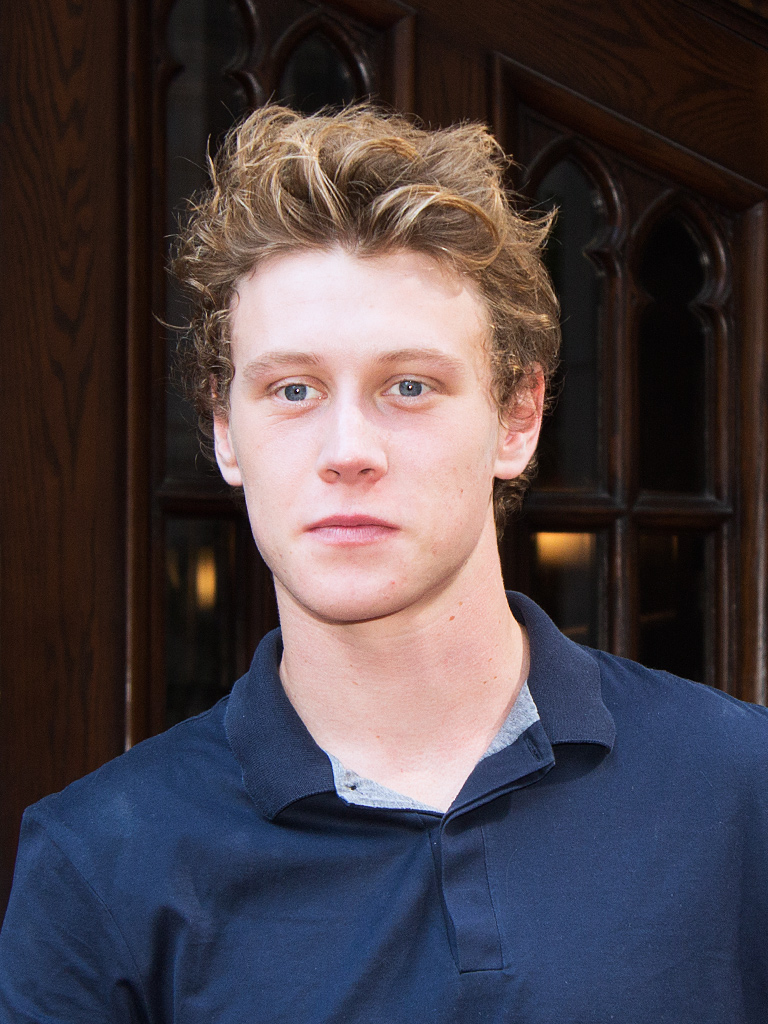
Saoirse Ronan (left) and George MacKay (right) received praise for their roles as Daisy and Eddie respectively; they were nominated for various accolades

The film received mixed reviews. On Rotten Tomatoes 66% of 109 critics gave the film a positive review with an average rating of 6.20/10. The site's consensus states: "Led by another strong performance from Saoirse Ronan and a screenplay that subverts YA clichés, How I Live Now blends young love with post-apocalyptic drama." Metacritic rated it 57 out of 100 based on reviews from 29 critics, indicating "mixed or average reviews".

Toronto Sun writer Steve Tilley praised Ronan's acting and positively compared her role as Daisy to that of Jennifer Lawrence's role as Katniss Everdeen in The Hunger Games series. He stated, "Kids battling for their lives in a near-future world taken from the pages of a young adult novel sounds a bit familiar - paging Katniss Everdeen - but How I Live Now has at least one major difference from Hollywood's interpretation of The Hunger Games: it doesn't shy away from graphic grimness". Ronan responded to the comparison saying, "What I love about [our film] is that it's very realistic, and it's very much a reminder that this could happen at any moment, and this is probably how it would be".

Justin Chang of Variety called it an "uneven but passionate adaptation". He wrote that the "role of Daisy likely wouldn't have worked with a less capable actress at the helm, and Ronan, whose recent performances in films like Hanna and The Host have proven her willing to get her hands dirty, gives flesh, ferocity and weight to the character's many transformations, from sullen ingrate to loving cousin, from passionate lover to Katniss Everdeen-style heroine". He also noted MacKay's performance calling it "a nice, watchful presence as the somewhat idealised love interest".

He also praised Macdonald's work in conjunction with the production of the film despite their limited resources and intimate scale. Todd McCarthy of The Hollywood Reporter called it "a derivative teen romance in an apocalyptic setting." Jeanette Catsoulis of The New York Times wrote that the film "struggles to balance a nebulous narrative on tentpole moments of rich emotional resonance." Alan Scherstuhl of The Village Voice also compared Daisy to Katniss calling the film a "tender, humane, and searing" film with "scenes of great beauty and world-ending terror." Conversely, Andy Klein, writer for Glendale News-Press felt the film "muddled" its way through the plot.

=== Accolades ===
Group	Year (Note: Indicates the year of ceremony. Each year is linked to the article about the awards held that year, wherever possible.)	Category	Recipient	Result	Ref.
Adelaide Film Festival	2013	International Best Feature Award	Kevin Macdonald	Nominated	
British Independent Film Awards	2013	Best Actress	Saoirse Ronan	Nominated	
British Independent Film Awards	2013	Most Promising Newcomer	Harley Bird	Nominated	
Chicago International Film Festival	2013	Audience Choice Award	Kevin Macdonald	Nominated	
London Critics Circle Film Awards	2014	Young British Performer of the Year	Saoirse Ronan	Nominated	
London Critics Circle Film Awards	2014	Young British Performer of the Year	George MacKay	Nominated	
Richard Attenborough Film Awards	2014	Breakthrough Award	George MacKay	Won	
Saturn Awards	2014	Best International Film (United Kingdom)	How I Live Now	Nominated	
Saturn Awards	2014	Best Performance by a Younger Actor	Saoirse Ronan	Nominated	
