= Evie Pig =

Peppa Pig character

- Peppa Pig character
- First appearance: Peppa Meets the Baby; 30 May 2025
- Created by: Astley Baker Davies

In-universe information
- Species: Pig
- Gender: Female
- Family: Mummy Pig, Daddy Pig, Peppa Pig and George Pig

Evie Pig is a character on the British preschool animated children's television series Peppa Pig. The decision to have the titular character Peppa Pig's mother Mummy Pig have another baby was made after the show's 20th anniversary in 2024. The pregnancy was announced on Good Morning Britain (GMB) in February 2025. Interviews with the character Mummy Pig were published by People and Grazia. The baby's gender was revealed as female in April when the Battersea Power Station's chimneys lit up pink. The baby's birth was announced on GMB on 20 May, with them saying Evie had been born in the Lindo Wing of St Mary's Hospital, London. The birth was also announced on Instagram via a town crier. Evie debuted in the theatre release Peppa Meets the Baby, consisting of ten episodes.

Colleen McNally, a mother from County Louth, Ireland, asked Peppa Pig's owners Hasbro to name the baby after her dead son Daragh. Hasbro responded by sending Peppa Pig toys to McNally. The Irish Independent and The Independent consider Evie to be shaking up the show, and People compared the storyline to a similar one in the Bluey episode "The Sign". The lead up to Evie's birth won the series a Gold Honor in Earned Media at the 18th annual Shorty Awards.

== Development and production ==
The image used to announce Evie's birth

After Peppa Pig's 20th anniversary in 2024, Mark Baker and Neville Astley decided to add a new character to the show's core family—Peppa Pig, Mummy Pig, Daddy Pig, and George Pig—to change the show's main dynamic for season 11. Peppa Pig had previously covered the topic of pregnancy with the character Mummy Rabbit in the episode "Mummy Rabbit's Bump" 14 years prior. Hasbro's senior vice-president of franchise strategy and management Esra Cafer considered the pregnancy an "important topic to explore".

The pregnancy was announced on the British breakfast television programme Good Morning Britain (GMB) on 27 February 2025. On the program, Mummy held up an ultrasound and said that Peppa and George had figured out something was unusual with her before the baby bump appeared, making her tell Peppa early. On Mother's Day, the episode "The Big Announcement" was released. In the episode, Mummy and Daddy tell their children Peppa and George about her pregnancy. Interviews with the Mummy Pig character about her baby were published by People and Grazia.

The gender was revealed on 25 April when the Battersea Power Station's chimneys lit up pink to signify that the baby was female. On 20 May, GMB said that Mummy had given birth to Evie at 5:34 a.m. in the Lindo Wing of St Mary's Hospital, London. She said that Evie was named after Peppa's aunt. The GMB presenter Richard Arnold shared the first image of Evie on the program, saying that a batch of images was given to him by Peppa's father Daddy Pig. On Instagram, the birth was announced by a town crier outside the hospital.

Evie debuted on 30 May 2025 in Peppa Meets the Baby, an hour-long theatre premiere where Evie is introduced into the Peppa family's life. The feature consists of ten new episodes. She made her stage debut in Peppa Pig's Big Family Show, where she was carried by a Mummy Pig costumed character, portrayed by Charlie Culkin, in a baby sling.

== Reception ==
Before Evie's name was revealed, Colleen McNally from Dundalk, County Louth, Ireland, had appealed to Peppa Pig rights-holder Hasbro to name the new character after her son Daragh. Daragh was a fan of Peppa Pig and died from cancer at the age of 11 in 2019. Ahead of the birth, Hasbro responded to McNally, saying that they were "deeply moved by Daragh's story" and sending her toys which depicted Daragh as a pig wearing a Dundalk F.C. jersey.

Grazia considered the pregnancy announcement to have "broken the internet", and instilled excitement in the show's fanbase. After the birth announcement, the UK-based nursery brand Mamas & Papas and British health and beauty retailer Boots congratulated Mummy Pig, while the radio station network Heart called the birth an iconic scene. In their article on the birth, NBC News said that Peppa Pig has become a "global phenomenon in recent years", noting the introduction of the character Penny the Polar Bear, who has lesbian parents, in 2022.

Lydia Spencer-Elliott, writing for the Irish Independent and The Independent, considered Evie to be "[shaking] up the show for the first time in 20 years". People said that Evie was starting a new chapter in the family's lives. The Independent's Charlotte Cripps compared the pregnancy story to Bluey's reveal that one of the characters, Brandy Cattle, was pregnant in "The Sign" after she was shown to have struggled with infertility. She also said that the storyline was the first time pregnancy was "such a massive deal in a hit children's animated TV series". The social media lead up to Evie's birth won the series a Gold Honor in Earned Media at the 18th annual Shorty Awards in May 2026.
