= What I Was =

2007 young adult novel by Meg Rosoff

- First edition cover
- Author: Meg Rosoff
- Language: English
- Genre: Young adult
- Publisher: Puffin
- Publication date: 30 August 2007
- Publication place: United Kingdom
- Pages: 208 pp
- ISBN: 978-0-14-138343-9
- OCLC: 183143568
- LC Class: PZ7.R719563 Wg 2007

What I Was is a 2007 young adult novel by Meg Rosoff, her third. The book was shortlisted for both the Costa Children's Book Award and the Carnegie Medal.

== Plot introduction ==
What I Was tells the story of a secret friendship between two teenagers, one an unhappy public schoolboy and the other living an independent and isolated life on the beach near the school. It is set on the East Anglian coast in 1962.

== Plot summary ==
The book is framed as the reminiscence of an old man recalling the year he discovered love. It is written as a first-person narrative.

The novel opens with the protagonist, Hilary, a sixteen-year-old boy arriving at a grim East Anglian boarding school in 1962 after being twice expelled from previous institutions. He has no interest in study, no aptitude for sports and a great dislike of both pupils and teachers. He compares the school to a prison and finds life there unbearable.

While slacking on a school cross-country run, he meets Finn, who lives alone in a beachside shack and sustains himself by fishing and working at the market. Hilary thinks Finn has an ideal life, and admires and envies him. He begins to visit the silent, enigmatic boy, and they are able to spend some afternoons together. He lies to his parents and the school so that he can stay at the shack during the Easter holidays.

On one visit to Finn, Hilary realizes his friend is ill, and suspects he may have given the other boy glandular fever, which had spread through the school several weeks before. He tries to look after Finn himself but after a while becomes frightened and calls the emergency services. Finn runs away from the shack but Hilary later finds him in hospital.

Both schoolboys and adults misunderstand the innocent nature of their friendship, particularly when it is discovered that Finn is only fourteen, two years younger than Hilary, and is actually a girl, biologically. He leaves the school and does not see Finn again for many years. Eventually he returns to the coast, stays in Finn's by then abandoned shack, and realizes his dream of "becoming" Finn.

== References to history and geography ==
There are frequent references to the Dark Ages, the period being taught at the school. The teacher stresses the battles and the brutality, which appeal to most of his students, but Finn's primitive life at the hut represents the austere self-sufficiency of the period, which appeals to Hilary.

The sinking of England's eastern coastline is also often mentioned. The sunken city and Roman fort are the focus of a sailing expedition in the earlier part of the book. Later in the same year, Finn's shack becomes flooded. In the closing chapter, set in the mid-21st century, the old man's boat passes over the school, now completely consumed by the rising sea.

== Translations ==
- Dutch: Wat ik was. Translated by Jenny de Jonge. Antwerp: Moon. 2008. ISBN 9789048800230.
- French: Ce que j'étais. Translated by Luc Rigoureau. Vanves: Hachette. 2008. ISBN 9782012016873.
- German: Damals, das Meer, lit. 'Back Then, the Sea'. Translated by Brigitte Jakobeit. Hamburg: Carlsen. 2009. ISBN 9783551581969.
- Russian: Каким я был, romanized: Kakim ya byl. Translated by Olga Bukhina and Galina Gimon. Moscow: Belaya vorona. 2018. ISBN 9785001140399.
