= Just in Case (novel) =

2006 young adult novel by Meg Rosoff

- Front cover of first edition
- Author: Meg Rosoff
- Language: English
- Genre: Young-adult novel, magic realism
- Publisher: Penguin Books
- Publication date: 3 August 2006
- Publication place: United Kingdom
- Pages: 231 pp (first edition)
- ISBN: 978-0-14-138078-0
- OCLC: 224849493
- LC Class: PZ7.R719563 Jus 2006

Just in Case is a young-adult novel by Meg Rosoff published by Penguin in 2006. Its adolescent protagonist David Case spends the majority of the book attempting to avoid fate. Rosoff won the annual Carnegie Medal, recognising the year's best children's book published in the U.K. In a press release announcing the award, the librarians called it "a story about death, depression, sex, choice and survival."

Just in Case also won the German Jugendliteraturpreis and made the shortlists for the Booktrust Teenage Prize and the 2006 Costa Book Awards.

Random House (Wendy Lamb Books) published the first U.S. edition, also in 2006.

== Plot summary ==
The book is set in Luton, Bedfordshire where fifteen-year-old David Case saves his younger brother from falling out of an open window. Scared by the experience, he starts to see danger everywhere, believes that Fate is stalking him, and decides to change his identity in order to escape his destiny. Fate at various points takes over the narration revealing David is right but it also lampshades that David is somewhat responsible for making things so interesting thus it's implied fate only became actively interested after David began trying to hide. Fate seems to treat human life as a game of cat and mouse and notes David plays well. He changes his name to Justin, adopts a new wardrobe, seeks out new friends, acquires an imaginary dog, all in the hope of avoiding Fate. His new, moody, self-absorbed persona attracts attention, not all of it good, and Fate is not fooled at all. Fate eventually speaks to David/Justin in his head and mocks him he also reminds him that as the good the good things are also down to fate. Eventually David's little brother a genius realises how he set off events in motion by inadvertently giving his brother the idea of fate stalking him. He apologises to David and gets him to think of his new friends and his family and realise that all fates are connected and there is just as much chance as bad happening. With this realisation fate loses interest in singling David/Justin and lets him exist. The title and David's adopted name Justin Case refer to his preparation phobia.

== Translations ==
- French: Si jamais..., lit. 'If Ever...'. Translated by Luc Rigoureau. Vanves: Hachette. 2007. ISBN 9782012013537.
- Dutch: Het toevallige leven van Justin Case, lit. 'The Accidental Life of Justin Case'. Translated by Jenny de Jonge. Amsterdam: Pimento. 2008. ISBN 9789049921668.
- Swedish: Justin Case. Translated by Helena Ridelberg. Stockholm: Brombergs Bokförlag. 2008. ISBN 9789173370240.
- Italian: Justin. Translated by Alessia Donin. Rome: Fanucci. 2010. ISBN 9788834716595.
- Hungarian: Just in Case: Sorsbújócska, lit. 'Just in Case: Hide and Seek'. Translated by Zoltán Pék. Budapest: Európa. 2014. ISBN 9789630797085.
- Portuguese: Se alguma vez..., lit. 'If Sometime...'. Translated by Fabiana Colasanti. Rio de Janeiro: Galera Record. 2014. ISBN 9788501087348.

== See also ==
Awards
Preceded by Tamar	Carnegie Medal recipient 2007	Succeeded by Here Lies Arthur
