= The Secret Agent (1975 TV play) =

1975 television adaptation

- Based on: The Secret Agent
- Written by: Joseph Conrad
- Starring: Paul Rogers; Frances White; Robert Hardy; Anton Rodgers; Joyce Carey; Peter Sallis; Michael Gambon
- Country of origin: England

Production
- Producer: Rosemary Hill
- Production location: England
- Running time: 95 Minutes
- Production company: BBC

Original release
- Network: BBC Two
- Release: 1 October 1975

The Secret Agent is a 1975 television play adaptation of Joseph Conrad's book of the same name. It was produced by the BBC and screened on 1 October 1975 on BBC Two.

== Plot ==
Set in 1905 a secret agent named Adolf Verloc causes a bomb explosion which kills his wife's brother. He keeps his secret of him being a terrorist hidden from his wife Winnie and his son Stevie. He is about to cause another bomb attack along with Mr. Vladimir, but Chief Inspector Heat has been called to try and solve the case about the bombing attack witch killed a man and his boss believes it was Winnie Verloc's brother but Chief Inspector Heat soon finds out it was Adolf Verloc. Once he finds out he goes and questions both Adolf and his wife Winnie and soon Winnie finds out about what Adolf has been hiding from her. Chief Inspector Heat then leaves both of them but then soon after Winnie eventually kills Adolf and her friend Tom Ossipon try's to help her since Winnie has all of Adolf's money but he eventually runs away and leaves her. Tom Ossipon and his fellow friend the Professor find out the next morning in the newspapers that Winnie drowned herself in the English Channel.

== Cast ==
- Paul Rogers as Adolf Verloc
- Frances White as Winnie Verloc
- Robert Hardy as Assistant Commissioner
- Anton Rodgers as Mr. Vladimir
- Joyce Carey as Lady Dorothy
- Peter Sallis as Chief Inspector Heat
- Michael Gambon as Tom Ossipon
- John Cater as The Professor
- Vernon Dobtcheff as Karl Yundt
- Bruce Purchase as Mr. Michaelis
- Vivienne Burgess as Winnie's Mother
- Peter Clough as Stevie
- Ann Queensberry as Guest
- Andree Evans as Guest
- Sara Van Beers as Guest

== Reception ==
The film was broadcast once on BBC Two on the 1 October 1975. The film is intact and is in the BBC Archives. The film is not available at the British Film Institute.
