= Meg Rosoff =

American novelist (born 1956)

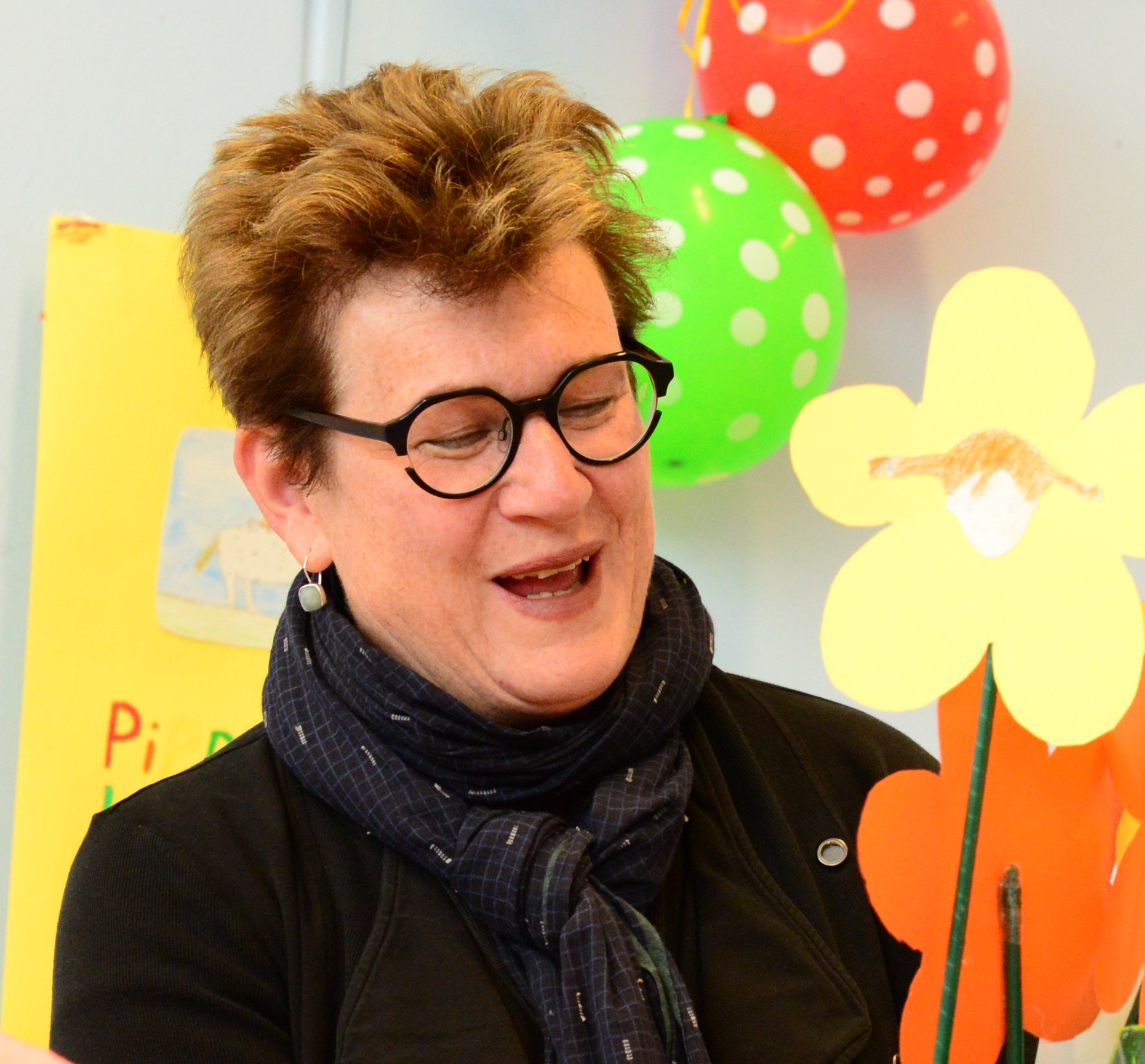
- Rosoff in Stockholm, 2016
- Born: 16 October 1956 (age 69); Boston, Massachusetts, U.S.
- Occupations: Writer, novelist
- Writing career
- Language: English
- Genre: Fiction

Meg Rosoff (born 16 October 1956) is an American writer based in London, United Kingdom. She is best known for the novel How I Live Now (Puffin, 2004), which won the Guardian Prize, the Printz Award, the Branford Boase Award and made the Whitbread Awards shortlist. Her second novel, Just in Case (Penguin, 2006), won the annual Carnegie Medal from the British librarians recognising the year's best children's book published in the UK.

== Early life and education ==
Rosoff was born in Boston, Massachusetts, in 1956, into a Jewish family. She was the second of four sisters. She attended Harvard University from 1974 to 1977, then moved to London and studied sculpture at Saint Martin's School of Art. She returned to the United States to finish her degree in 1980, and later moved to New York City for 9 years, where she worked in publishing and advertising.

== Career ==
In 1989, at the age of 32 Rosoff returned to London and has lived there ever since. Between 1989 and 2003, she worked for a variety of advertising agencies as a copywriter. She began to write novels after her youngest sister died of breast cancer. Her young-adult novel How I Live Now was published in 2004, in the same week she herself was diagnosed with breast cancer. It won the annual Guardian Children's Fiction Prize, and the annual Michael L. Printz Award from the American Library Association, recognising the year's "best book written for teens, based entirely on its literary merit". In 2005 she published a children's book, Meet Wild Boars, which was illustrated by Sophie Blackall. Just in Case, published in 2006, won the British Carnegie Medal and German Jugendliteraturpreis. What I Was, Rosoff's third novel, was published in August 2007, followed by two more collaborations with Blackall: Wild Boars Cook and Jumpy Jack and Googily. Another novel, The Bride's Farewell, was named one of 2009's ten best books for young adults that were published in the American adult market.

There Is No Dog, published by Penguin in 2011 (US edition, Putnam, 2012) is a comic novel supposing that God is a 19-year-old boy. Rosoff told Book Nerd, "The title comes from a joke about a dyslexic atheist walking up and down in front of a church with a sign that reads THERE IS NO DOG."

Picture Me Gone was a finalist for the 2013 National Book Award for Young People's Literature (U.S.).

The film of How I Live Now, directed by Kevin MacDonald, opened in Britain on 4 October 2013 and in America and Canada on 5 November 2013. It starred Saoirse Ronan and George MacKay and featured Tom Holland.

In 2016, Rosoff won the Astrid Lindgren memorial award and the largest cash prize in children's literature for her entire catalog of work.

== Bibliography ==
=== Picture books ===
- Meet Wild Boars, illustrated by Sophie Blackall (2005)
- Jumpy Jack and Googily, illustrated by Sophie Blackall (2008)
- Wild Boars Cook, illustrated by Sophie Blackall (2010)
- It's A Moose!, illustrated by David Ercolini (2020)

=== Middle Grade Books ===
- Good Dog, McTavish, illustrated by Grace Easton (2017)
- McTavish Goes Wild, illustrated by Grace Easton (2018)
- McTavish Takes The Biscuit, illustrated by Grace Easton (2019)
- McTavish on the Move, illustrated by Grace Easton and David Shephard (2020)

=== Novels ===
- How I Live Now (2004)
- Just in Case (2006)
- What I Was (2007)
- The Bride's Farewell (2009)
- Moose Baby (originally Vamoose) (2010)
- There Is No Dog (2011)
- Picture Me Gone (2013)
- Jonathan Unleashed (2016)
- The Great Godden (2020)
- Friends Like These (2022)

=== Non-fiction ===
- London Guide: your passport to great travel (Washington: Open Road, 1995), by Rosoff & Caren Acker

== Honors ==
=== Lifetime achievement honors and awards ===
- Fellow of the Royal Society of Literature (2014)
- Astrid Lindgren Memorial Award (2016)
- Fellow of Homerton College, Cambridge

=== Individual book awards ===
==== How I Live Now ====
- 2004 Guardian Children's Fiction Prize
- 2005 Michael L. Printz Award (US)
- 2005 Branford Boase Award (first novel)
- 2005 Der Luchs des Jahres
- Finalist for 2005 LA Times Book Prize
- Finalist 2005 Whitbread Children's Book Award
- Finalist 2005 Orange First Novel prize
- Finalist 2006 Deutscher Jugendliteraturpreis

==== Just in Case ====
- 2007 Carnegie Medal
- 2008 Deutscher Jugendliteraturpreis
- Finalist 2007 LA Times Book Prize
- Finalist 2007 Booktrust Teenage Prize
- Finalist 2007 Costa Book Award

==== What I Was ====
- 2009 Der Luchs des Jahres
- Finalist 2008 Carnegie Medal
- Finalist 2008 Costa Book Award
- Finalist 2009 New Angle Prize

==== The Bride's Farewell ====
- 2010 Alex Award
- Finalist 2011 Carnegie Medal

==== Picture Me Gone ====
- Finalist 2013 U.S. National Book Award

===== Good Dog McTavish =====
- Winner 2020 Premio Letteratura Ragazzi Prize

==== The Great Godden ====
- Finalist 2020 Costa Awards
- Winner 2021 Orbil prize (awarded by the Italian association of independent bookshops)
- YA Book Prize finalist 2021
- School Reading List book of the month June 2020
