= How I Live Now =

2004 novel by Meg Rosoff

- First edition cover
- Author: Meg Rosoff
- Language: English
- Genre: Young adult literature
- Publisher: Penguin Books
- Publication date: 5 August 2004
- Publication place: United Kingdom
- Pages: 211 pp
- ISBN: 978-0-14-138075-9
- OCLC: 56465545

How I Live Now is a novel by Meg Rosoff, first published in 2004. It received generally positive reviews and won the British Guardian Children's Fiction Prize and the American Printz Award for young-adult literature.

== Plot ==
Fifteen-year-old Elizabeth (who goes by the name of Daisy) is sent from the United States to stay with her aunt Penn and her children, Daisy's cousins, on a remote farm in the United Kingdom during the outbreak of a fictional third world war of the 21st century. Though she is happy about moving away from her stepmother who is pregnant, Daisy is homesick at first. First meeting her 14-year-old cousin Edmond at the airport, Daisy calls him "some kind of mutt"; however, her view of Edmond changes after settling in. Arriving at the farm she also meets Edmond's twin brother Isaac, nine-year-old Piper, and Osbert, who is the eldest brother. Daisy's homesickness only lasts for a short while before she and her extended family become close, and Daisy begins to embrace her new home. Daisy soon finds herself falling in love with Edmond and, after realising that the affection is mutual, begins a relationship with him.

Aunt Penn travels to Oslo, where she is stranded after war breaks out. An unknown enemy occupies the UK. The war becomes increasingly difficult for Daisy and her cousins as it increasingly affects their lives, eventually leading to food shortages and lack of other resources. One day, the farm is taken over by soldiers who separate the boys from the girls by sending them away to live at separate homes, and then separate farms. Daisy and Piper are forced to put survival as their top priority and cannot look for the male members of their family. Gradually finding their way back home, the two girls learn the harsh consequences of war and wait for their family in the barn house. After the war ends, Daisy must deal with putting the pieces of her life back together and overcoming the terrible experience of war as she reunites with the forever changed members of her family, including a physically and emotionally scarred Edmond.

Near the end of the book, Daisy (who had been pulled back to the United States by her father) goes back to the UK to see Edmond and the rest. Edmond, who thinks Daisy has broken their promise of always being together, refuses to see her at first. However, he eventually accepts her once again. Instead of going back to the United States, Daisy continues to live with Edmond and the rest of the family in the UK.

== Characters ==
- Elizabeth (aka Daisy) is a 15-year-old from New York. She comes to Britain to live with Aunt Penn out of spite toward her father and her stepmother. She falls in love with Edmond and begins a relationship with him. Daisy is described as determined, steadfast, and selfish at times.
- Isaac is a 14-year-old boy who is Daisy's cousin, Edmond's brother & Piper's elder brother. In the beginning of the story, he doesn't really speak much, however, towards the end of the book he talks more. He likes to commune with animals.
- Piper is Aunt Penn's only daughter and Daisy's cousin. She is the youngest of the family and has an almost angelic essence to her. Daisy feels protective of her and acts as her mother when Aunt Penn is away. Words that would describe Piper would be energetic, sweet and innocent.
- Edmond is Isaac's brother and Piper's elder brother. He is in a relationship with Daisy though they are cousins. When Daisy first met him at the airport, she described him as "some kind of mutt, you know the ones you see at the dog shelter who are kind of hopeful and sweet and put their nose straight into your hand when they meet you with a certain kind of dignity and you know from that second that you're going to take him home?" Later in the story, he develops a very powerful relationship with Daisy. During the war, Edmond watches a massacre and is unable to talk and pull himself together because of the shock it gave him. Edmond is also very scarred by his war memories.
- Osbert is the eldest child, older brother to the twins, Edmond & Isaac, and Piper. He is 16 and a little self-important. He is "in charge" when Aunt Penn is away.
- Aunt Penn is the mother of Piper, Edmond, Isaac and Osbert. She is Daisy's deceased mother's sister. Daisy sees Aunt Penn as the caring and loving mother figure she never got to have. Aunt Penn was shot dead trying to re-enter the country two years after the war started, while trying to get back to her family, .
- Daisy's father is mostly too preoccupied with his second wife and his work to notice Daisy.
- Davina is Daisy's stepmother and Daisy's father's second wife. Daisy describes her as heartless and cruel, dubbing her "Davina the Diabolical". Daisy's stepmother is the reason why Daisy won't eat properly.
- Leah is Daisy's friend. During Daisy's stay at Aunt Penn's, Leah continually updates Daisy with recent news and events occurring at her school.
- Mrs McEvoy is the woman whom Daisy and Piper are sent to during the war. She is described as too nice and cheery, but Daisy overlooks this because "at least she was trying to be nice which even I had to admit, is something". Mrs McEvoy's husband (Major McEvoy) was shot dead by the occupying troops while trying to save Joe and this drives her mad.
- Joe is a boy whom Daisy works with while picking apples; he gets shot along with Major McEvoy.

== Awards ==
- 2004 Guardian Children's Fiction Prize
- 2005 Michael L. Printz Award
- 2005 Branford Boase Award

Runners up, etc.

- 2004 Shortlisted for the Whitbread Children's Book of the Year
- 2004 Shortlisted for the Orange Prize
- 2005 Shortlisted for the Booktrust Teenage Prize.

== Radio adaptation ==
In 2007 the novel was adapted for radio by Elizabeth Burke. It was directed by Kate McAll and the music was composed by John Hardy. There were five parts of fifteen minutes each, which aired daily from 12 to 15 November as the Woman's Hour Drama on BBC Radio 4.

== Film adaptation ==
The novel was adapted into a film directed by Kevin Macdonald that was released in 2013 and starred Irish actress Saoirse Ronan playing the role of Daisy, with George MacKay as Edmond (now written as the oldest cousin), Tom Holland as Isaac (now the younger cousin) and Harley Bird as Piper.

== See also ==
- World War III in popular culture
- Tomorrow series
