= My First Album (Peppa Pig album) =

Studio album by Peppa Pig
- Released: 19 July 2019
- Genre: Children's music
- Length: 38:32
- Label: eOne
- Producer: Paul Moessl

Peppa Pig chronology
Theme Music EP (2016)	My First Album (2019)	Peppa's Adventures: The Album (2021)

Singles from My First Album
- 1. "Bing Bong Zoo" Released: 14 June 2019

My First Album is the debut studio album from the British television programme Peppa Pig. It was released by eOne Music on 19 July 2019 in promotion of the series. It was preceded by the release of the lead single "Bing Bong Zoo".

== Background ==
"Bing Bong Zoo" was released on 14 June 2019 along with the album's pre-order as the album's lead single. Following the album's announcement, a Twitter interaction between the show's Twitter account and Australian rapper Iggy Azalea went viral after the latter tweeted "It's over for me now", in reference to My First Album being released the same day as Azalea's second studio album In My Defense. The Peppa Pig account responded with a tweet referencing Azalea's single "Fancy", before Azalea jokingly asked for a collaboration. The interaction and the album's release spawned several internet memes.

== Composition ==
The composition of My First Album consists of mostly glockenspiel and piano, along with a children's choir. Peppa Pig's vocals are provided by Harley Bird. Several songs on the album are extended versions of songs that appeared on the show. These include "Bing Bong Zoo", "Rainbow, Rainbow", and "Jumping in Muddy Puddles". "Getting Ready Song" is a song set to the tune of "Row, Row, Row Your Boat" about self-care. "Big Balloon" has been described as a "gently plucked" song about flying on an air balloon. "Peppa Party Time" was described as the album's "token dance number", and was deemed by USA Today as a highlight of the album.

== Critical reception ==
Joshua Bote of USA Today gave the album a mixed review, writing that the album "could have capitalized on her instant virality ... But it's a little too quaint, a little too old-fashioned for these modern times", suggesting that children could instead dance to rap songs and become viral memes themselves. He concluded his review by calling the album "certainly educational, and pleasant enough that listeners across generation won't hate it when it's on. But they might not remember it once the music stops".

Polygon writer Palmer Haasch reported that Stan Twitter boosted My First Album and turned Peppa into a gay icon.

== Track listing ==
All tracks are written by Clare Bradley and Paul Moessl except where noted

No.	Title	Writer(s)	Length
1.	"It's Peppa Pig"	Bradley, Moessl, Julian Nott	2:25
2.	"Bing Bong Zoo"	Nott	3:10
3.	"Let's Get Ready!"		2:05
4.	"Expert Daddy Pig"		2:50
5.	"Rainbow, Rainbow"	Bradley, Moessl, Nott	2:03
6.	"Super Potato's Theme"	Bradley, Moessl, Nott	1:55
7.	"Peppa and Friends"		2:14
8.	"The Class of Madame Gazelle"		2:24
9.	"Festival Fun!"		2:07
10.	"Jumping in Muddy Puddles"	Nott	2:50
11.	"Holidays!"		1:40
12.	"Traffic"		3:09
13.	"Balloon Ride"	Bradley, Moessl, Nott	2:25
14.	"Busy Miss Rabbit"		2:19
15.	"Peppa Party Time"		2:10
16.	"Peppa's Lullaby"		2:46
Total length:			38:32

Vinyl release bonus track
No.	Title	Length
17.	"Bing Bong Christmas"	2:53
Total length:		41:25

== Charts ==
Chart (2019)	Peak position
Irish Albums (IRMA)	91
Scottish Albums (Official Charts)	26
UK Albums (Official Charts)	79
UK Independent Albums (Official Charts)	6
UK Independent Album Breakers (OCC)	1

== Certifications ==
Certifications of My First Album, with pure sales where available
Region	Certification	Certified units/sales
United Kingdom (BPI)	Gold	100,000^{‡}
^{‡} Sales+streaming figures based on certification alone.

== Release history ==
Territory	Date	Format(s)	Ref.
Various	19 July 2019	Digital download; streaming	
