= Federico Mollicone =

Italian politician (born 1970)

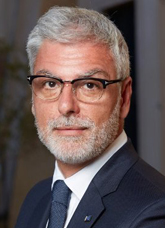
- Mollicone in 2021

Member of the Chamber of Deputies
- Incumbent
- Assumed office 23 March 2018
- Constituency: Lazio 1

Personal details
- Born: 23 November 1970 (age 55)
- Party: Brothers of Italy

Federico Mollicone (born 23 November 1970) is an Italian politician of Brothers of Italy serving as a member of the Chamber of Deputies. He was first elected in the 2018 general election, and was re-elected in 2022. Since 2022, he has chaired the Culture, Science and Education Committee.

== Biography ==
The son of a member of the Italian Social Movement, a supporter of Raut, and a contributor to the Ordine Nuovo, after graduating from the Camillo Cavour State Science High School, he began working in the fields of marketing, communications, and cultural event planning. In 2000, he founded a communications agency, which he left in 2008.

He is married and has two children.
