= Frances White (actress) =

English actress (born 1938)

- Born: Frances V. Connell White; 1 November 1938 (age 87); Leeds, West Riding of Yorkshire, England
- Education: Royal Central School of Speech and Drama
- Occupation: Actress
- Years active: 1960s–present
- Notable work: Peppa Pig

Frances White (born 1 November 1938, Leeds) is an English actress. She played Kate Hamilton in Crossroads and Vera Flood in the BBC sitcom May to December.

== Early life ==
White's father, Frank White, was a production designer whose credits include Clash of the Titans (1981). White originally hoped to become a ballet dancer, but upon being interviewed for the Royal Ballet at Sadlers Wells Theatre at age 11, she was not accepted due to having "the wrong kind of feet" and a weak spine. Enjoying acting at school, she decided to go on to the Central School of Speech and Drama for three years, leaving with a contract at Dundee Repertory Theatre and a scholarship for Associated-Rediffusion, enabling her to appear in their productions.

== Career ==
White's TV appearances have included Juliet Bravo; Trevor's World of Sport; Dangerfield; Holby City; A Very Peculiar Practice; as Cassandra, prophetess of Troy, in the Doctor Who story The Myth Makers; as Julia, daughter of Augustus, Emperor of Rome, in I, Claudius; and as Queen Charlotte in Prince Regent. Her film credits include roles in The Pumpkin Eater (1964), Press for Time (1966) and Mary, Queen of Scots (1971). She voices Granny Pig in the children's animated series Peppa Pig (2004–present).

White continues to act and do voice-overs. As a voice-over artist, she is represented by Rhubarb Voices.

== Filmography ==
Filmography
Year	Film	Role	Notes
1964	The Pumpkin Eater	Older Dinah	
1965	Summer and Winter	Judith Benson	Television film
1966	Press for Time	Liz Corcoran	
1971	Mary, Queen of Scots	Mary Fleming	
1972	Time to Lose	Judith Benson	Television film
1975	The Secret Agent	Winnie Verloc	
	The Unknown Soldier	Dorothy Truman	
1999	Emma 18	Emma	short film

=== Series ===
Series
Year	Show	Role	Notes
1961	Deadline Midnight	Anna Condrini	
1961	Winning Widows	Girl	
1961	Probation Officer	Girl in the Tube	
1962	Studio 4	Santiana Rinaldi Melanie Langdon	
1962	Harpers West One	Daphne Sniden	
1962	BBC Sunday-Night Play	Sonia Elsa	
1963	Drama 61-67	Jean	
1963	Television Playhouse	Sally	
1964	First Night	Gillie Moffatt	
1965	Londoners	Lucy	
1965	The Wednesday Thriller	Lily	
1965	Doctor Who	Cassandra	
1965	No Hiding Place	Rita Plenning	
1966	Lord Raingo	Gwen	
1966	This Man Craig	Sandra Thorton	
1967	ITV Play of the Week	Angela Bennett Janice Norah Luke Nurse	
1967	Boy Meets Girl	Inge Chmiet	
1967	Omnibus	Ruth	Documentary
1968	Sanctuary	Ruth Lee	
1968	Half Hour Story	Mavie	
1968	Gazette	Janet Parker	
1968–1980	Playhouse	Clare Marj	
1969	The Wednesday Play	Silena	
1969	Armchair Theatre	Jan Ruth Pud	
1969	The Expert	Molly	
1971	The Rivals of Sherlock Holmes	Lady Irene	
1971	Justice	Audrey Miller	
1972	Thirty-Minute Theatre	Miss Talbot	
1972	Sunday Night Theatre	Judith Benson Margaret	
1973	Love Story	Barbara	
1973	Hunter's Walk	Christine Lewis	
1974	A Raging Calm	Andrea Warner	Miniseries
1974	Z-Cars	Ann Bartley	
1974	Thriller	Virna Folt	
1975	Centre Play	Beatrice	
1975–1977	Rooms	Vera Pusey Frances	
1976	A Little Bit of Wisdom	Linda Clark	
1976	I, Claudius	Julia	Miniseries
1976	Jackanory	Godwin	
1977	Crown Court	Meg Gibbs	
1977–1978	Crossroads	Kate Hamilton	
1979	Prince Regent	Queen Charlotte	
1981	Bognor	Thelma Gringe	
1981	Juliet Bravo	Mary Patterson	
1981-1982	Crossroads	Kate Hamilton	
1983	Rumpole of the Bailey	Auctioneer	
1985–1986	I Woke Up One Morning	Sister May	
1986	A Very Peculiar Practice	Dorothy Hampton	
1986	Paradise Postponed	Monica Bulstrode	Miniseries
1987	A Perfect Spy	Caroline Lumsden	
1989	Chelworth	Margaret Harper	
1989–1994	May to December	Vera Flood	Main role
1991	Cluedo	Biddle's Assistant	
1993	Casualty	Harriet Clayton	
1996	Harry's Mad	Miss Prendergast	
1996	Game On	Nurse	
1997	Peak Practice	Margaret Shaw	
1997	Plotlands	Housewife	
1997	Wycliffe	Marian Pierce	
1998–1999	Dangerfield	Molly Cramer	
1999	The Last Salute	Artist	
2000–2009	Doctors	Stella Wells Mary Phelps	
2001	Holby City	Val Merchant	
2002	Wild West	Miss Peppard	
2003	Trevor's World of Sport	Mrs. Heslop	
2004–present	Peppa Pig	Granny Pig (voice)	Recurring character
2004	The Courtroom	Elizabeth O'Connor	
2005	Hiroshima	Teriko Fuiji	Documentary film
2016–present	Paw Patrol	Ms. Marjorie	UK dub
2019–2020	Ricky Zoom	Toot	
