= Harley Bird =

British actress (born 2001)

- Born: Harley Fiona Riley; 13 December 2001 (age 24); Rochdale, Greater Manchester, England
- Other name: Harley Riley
- Education: Manchester School of Theatre
- Occupation: Actress
- Years active: 2007–present

Harley Fiona Riley (born 13 December 2001), better known by her stage name of Harley Bird, is an English actress. She was the third as well as the longest running voice of Peppa Pig, taking on the role in 2007 and leaving in 2020. The role was taken over by Amelie Bea Smith.

== Early life and education ==
Harley Fiona Riley was born in Rochdale, Greater Manchester in Northern England to Gill and Craig Riley, the second eldest of four children, with two sisters, Taylor and Olivia and brother Rosco. Bird attended Tring Park School for the Performing Arts in Hertfordshire on their Tring Park Associates programme before enrolling into the main school. She went on to graduate from the Manchester School of Theatre in 2023 with a Bachelor of Arts (BA) in Acting.

== Career ==
At age five, she was signed to Alphabet Kidz Talent Agency. A month later she gained the voice role of Peppa in the children's animated series Peppa Pig. She replaced the previous actors, Lily Snowden-Fine and Cecily Bloom. She first voiced Peppa on the 2007 "Peppa's Christmas" special and continued to voice the character for seasons 3, 4, 5 and the first half of the 6th. She voiced Peppa Pig on "The Official BBC Children in Need Medley" and various other pieces of show merchandise.

Bird's TV appearances and radio broadcasts include a behind-the-scenes feature on CBBC's Newsround and an interview in character as Peppa on BBC Radio One's Chris Moyles Show. She became the youngest British Academy Film Award winner when she won the Performer award at the 2011 BAFTA for her voice-artist work as Peppa Pig.

Bird announced that she was leaving the role of Peppa Pig on 31 January 2020, after 13 years and 185 episodes in the role. She was succeeded in the role by Amelie Bea Smith.

Bird starred as Daisy in Blueberry, a 2009 short film which won the Audience Award at the Cinequest Film Festival, She also starred as Piper alongside Saoirse Ronan in Kevin Macdonald's How I Live Now, released in 2013. She also starred in Goodbye, a radio drama by Morwenna Banks, her Peppa Pig co-star, that aired on BBC Radio 4 alongside Olivia Colman, Natascha McElhone, Darren Boyd, Alison Steadman, and John Simm. In 2017, Bird played the lead role of Sammy in Disney Channel's webisode series, So Sammy. In 2024, Bird starred in the Amy Winehouse biopic Back to Black as Winehouse's best friend Juliette Ashby.

== Filmography ==
Year	Title	Role	Notes
2007–2020	Peppa Pig	Peppa Pig and Baby Alexander	Voice
2009	Blueberry	Daisy	Short film
2010–2014	Hailey and Friends	Mika	Dubbed Voice
2013	How I Live Now	Piper	Film
2013	Goodbye	Maddy	BBC Radio 4 drama
2013–2020	Milkshake!	Peppa Pig	Voice
2014	Doctor Who	Ruby	Episode: "In the Forest of the Night"
2017	So Sammy	Sammy	Disney mini series
2024	Back to Black	Juliette Ashby	Film
TBA	My First Cinema Experience	Peppa Pig	Film: Voice
