= Amelie Bea Smith =

English child actress (born 2011)

- Born: 1 January 2011 (age 15)
- Occupation: Actress
- Years active: 2018–present

Amelie Bea Smith (born 1 January 2011) is an English child actress. She is known for her roles in the Netflix series The Haunting of Bly Manor (2020), the ITV drama Hollington Drive (2021), and as the voice of the titular Peppa Pig (2020–2025) on Channel 5.

== Early life ==
Smith has two sisters. She took classes at the Mark Jermin Stage School.

== Career ==
Smith began appearing in commercials and short films. She made her television debut in the BBC One soap opera EastEnders as Daisy, a role she would play from 2018 to 2019. In 2020, Smith began voicing the titular Peppa Pig on Channel 5, taking over the role from Harley Bird for the animated show's sixth series. Smith is the fourth actress to voice Peppa Pig. Later that year, she starred as Flora Wingrave in The Haunting of Bly Manor, the second instalment of the Netflix anthology The Haunting.

Smith had supporting roles as Eva in the 2021 ITV drama Hollington Drive, for which she was nominated for a National Film Award, and Emily Whitehouse in the 2022 Netflix thriller Anatomy of a Scandal. She shared the role of Charlotte McLean with her younger sister Darcie Smith the Sky Max science fiction series The Midwich Cuckoos and also appeared alongside Darcie in an episode of After Life.

Smith left the voice role of Peppa Pig in 2025 and was succeeded by Harriette Cox.

== Filmography ==
Year	Title	Role	Notes
2018–2019	EastEnders	Daisy	7 episodes
2020–2025	Peppa Pig	Peppa Pig	Main role
2020	The Haunting of Bly Manor	Flora Wingrave	Main role
2021	Hollington Drive	Eva	Miniseries
2022	After Life	Lisa	1 episode
2022	Call the Midwife	Deborah Packer	1 episode
2022	Anatomy of a Scandal	Emily Whitehouse	Recurring role; 6 episodes
2022	The Midwich Cuckoos	Charlotte McLean	Episode: "The Hive"
2024	Sweetpea	Teen Rhiannon	2 episodes
TBA	Perfidious	Alba	
