= Peppa Pig =

British preschool animated TV series

- Genre: Children's television series; Animated series
- Created by: Neville Astley; Mark Baker
- Written by: Neville Astley (2004–2023); Mark Baker (2004–2023); Phil Hall (2009–present); Matilda Tristam (2021–pres.); Sam Morrison (2021–pres.)
- Directed by: Neville Astley (2004–2023); Mark Baker (2004–2023); Phil Hall (2010–2023); Joris van Hulzen (2010–2023); Sarah Hoper (2010–2023); Andrea Tran (2023–present)
- Starring: Lily Snowden-Fine; Cecily Bloom; Harley Bird; Amelie Bea Smith; Harriette Cox; John Sparkes; Richard Ridings; Morwenna Banks; Oliver May; Alice May; Vincent van Hulzen; Kira Monteith; Holly Park; David Graham; Frances White; Sarah Ann Kennedy
- Narrated by: John Sparkes
- Theme music composer: Julian Nott
- Opening theme: "Peppa" by Lily Snowden-Fine
- Composer: Julian Nott
- Country of origin: United Kingdom
- Original language: English
- No. of series: 9
- No. of episodes: 459 (+5 specials) (list of episodes)

Production
- Executive producers: Joan Lofts; Laura Clunie; Olivier Dumont; Phil Davies; Chris White; Rebecca Harvey
- Producers: Phil Davies; Randi Yaffa; Gillian Iversen; Hannah Lee Miller
- Running time: 5 minutes 25 minutes (full series)
- Production companies: Astley Baker Davies Ltd (series 1–8) (Note: Alongside The Elf Factory Limited for Series 5 and Gaston's Cave Ltd for Series 6–8. Did not animate the last four episodes of Series 7, but did animate the first four episodes of Series 8); Contender Entertainment Group (series 1); Entertainment One Family (series 2–4) (Note: Known as Rubber Duck Entertainment for Series 2 and E1 Kids for Series 3); Entertainment One (series 5–8); Karrot Animation (series 7–present) (Note: Animated the last four episodes of Series 7, but did not animate the first four episodes of Series 8); Hasbro Entertainment (series 8–present)

Original release
- Network: Five / Channel 5 / 5; Nick Jr.
- Release: 31 May 2004 – present

Related
- Ben & Holly's Little Kingdom

Peppa Pig is a British preschool animated children's television series created by Neville Astley and Mark Baker. Produced by Hasbro Entertainment and Karrot Animation and formerly Astley Baker Davies, the series follows Peppa, an anthropomorphic piglet, and her family and friends portrayed as other animals. The show first aired on 31 May 2004. The ninth series began broadcasting in 2025. Peppa Pig has been broadcast in over 180 countries.

Peppa herself has been voiced by several performers through the years: Lily Snowden-Fine in series 1; Cecily Bloom in season 2; Harley Bird from "Peppa's Christmas" until "Christmas at The Hospital" (she was five-years old when she started); Amelie Bea Smith from "Valentine's Day" to "House Rules"; and Harriette Cox since "The Big Announcement". The series has also starred John Sparkes, Morwenna Banks, Richard Ridings, Oliver and Alice May, Vincent van Hulzen, Kira Monteith, and Holly Park.

On 31 December 2019, Hasbro acquired Entertainment One (eOne), which included the Peppa Pig franchise, for US$3.8 billion, making the franchise one of Hasbro's main brands. On 16 March 2021, it was announced that the series was renewed until 2027, with the original creators and studio (Astley Baker Davies) replaced by Karrot Animation (producers of Sarah & Duck). On 17 November 2022, Hasbro announced that they would be selling eOne's assets, while the Peppa Pig franchise would remain with Hasbro.

== Premise ==
Taking place in a world where almost all characters are animals, Peppa Pig revolves around the titular character and her family and friends. Each episode is approximately five minutes long. Each of Peppa's friends is a different species of animal. Episodes tend to feature everyday activities such as attending playgroup, playing games, visiting relatives and friends, or going to the playground.

The cast wear clothes, live in houses, and speak English, but still display some characteristics of the animals on which they are based: the pigs enjoy jumping in muddy puddles and the rabbits live in a burrow, and the animals make their stereotypical noises while they talk. The characters blush when embarrassed and display happiness, irritation, or bewilderment. Most characters are anthropomorphic, with some exceptions, such as Tiddles the Tortoise, Polly Parrot, and Mrs. Duck.

The narrator of the series, John Sparkes, reinforces the action and humour, usually saying "Oh, dear" when something unfortunate happens (such as when George starts crying). Most episodes end with characters falling over on their backs while laughing.

== Production and airing ==
In the United Kingdom, the first series of 52 five-minute episodes began on Channel 5 on 31 May 2004. Lily Snowden-Fine starred as Peppa. The second series of 52 episodes began on Channel 5 on 4 September 2006, with Cecily Bloom voicing Peppa, among other cast changes. The first special, "Peppa's Christmas", was the first episode to feature Harley Bird as the voice Peppa, starting at only five years old. The third series started telecasting on Channel 5's preschool-targeted block Milkshake! on 4 May 2009 with Harley Bird as Peppa.

In the United States, the series first aired as part of Cartoon Network's Tickle-U preschool programming block from 22 August 2005 to 2007. For these airings, the show was redubbed with American actors. There were no other official releases of this dub, and every US airing since 2008 uses the original British soundtrack. The series moved to Noggin the same year as part of Noggin Presents, a series of interstitial shorts aired between full-length shows. Since February 2011, the series has aired as a half-hour show with 5 segments per broadcast on Nick Jr. in the US (though for some episodes containing specials, like "Golden Boots" and "Around the World with Peppa", only 3 segments are used). As of 2025, there are nine series (and five standalone specials) of the programme.

Peppa Pig is animated using CelAction2D. It was originally produced by Astley Baker Davies, and, later on, Entertainment One. As of series eight, Karrot Animation and Hasbro Entertainment produced the show.

== Episodes ==
Series	Episodes	Originally released	
Series	Episodes	First released	Last released
1	52	31 May 2004	30 November 2004
2	52	4 September 2006	20 June 2007
Special	2	25 December 2007	
3	52	4 May 2009	17 December 2010
4	52	23 May 2011	28 December 2012
Specials	3	14 February 2015	6 March 2016
5	52	24 October 2016	21 September 2018
Film		7 April 2017	
6	52	5 February 2019	7 October 2020
7	65	5 March 2021	23 February 2023
8	52	4 September 2023	24 April 2025
9	TBA	30 May 2025	TBA

== Other media ==
=== Books ===
There is a series of books based on Peppa Pig, one of which, Peppa Meets the Queen, was written to coincide with the Queen's Diamond Jubilee.

=== Films ===
There have been several "Cinema Experiences" based on the series, featuring brand-new episodes. They were first shown in the UK, before being expanded internationally. The first one, titled Peppa Pig: The Golden Boots, was released by Entertainment One on 14 February 2015 and featured the titular 15-minute special, and other episodes. Wrap-around clips featuring presenters from Milkshake! also appeared. alongside several episodes of the TV series. As of December 2015, it had grossed £2,326,328.

A second one, and the first branded a "Cinema Experience", was released on 16 March 2017, was shown in cinemas by Entertainment One on 7 April 2017. It premiered nine episodes, four of which share the same theme of Peppa's holiday in Australia. Between the episodes are segments with a live-action host named Daisy (played by Emma Grace Arends) and Peppa and George as puppets, based on the Peppa Pig Live stage show.

Since then, three more "Cinema Experiences" have been released, including Festival of Fun! in 2019, published by Entertainment One; as well as Peppa's Cinema Party in 2024, celebrating the show's 20th anniversary and featuring ten new episodes including a three-part Wedding special; Peppa Meets the Baby in 2025, marking the debut of Peppa's new baby sister, Evie; and Festive Fun with Peppa in 2026, celebrating Evie's first Christmas, all released by Trafalgar Releasing.

Peppa Celebrates Chinese New Year (Simplified Chinese: 小猪佩奇過大年; Traditional Chinese: 小豬佩奇過大年; pinyin: Xiǎo Zhū Pèi Qí Guodà Nián) released exclusively in Chinese theatres on 5 February 2019 to commemorate the Year of the Pig.

Peppa Pig: Perfect Holiday (Simplified Chinese: 小猪佩奇：完美假期; Traditional Chinese: 小豬佩奇：完美假期; pinyin: Xiǎo Zhū Pèi Qí: Wánměi Jiàqī) is a 3D animated film that sees Peppa and her family travel to China. It was released in Chinese theaters on 1 October 2026 and will release in American theaters on 22 November 2026.

=== Theme parks ===
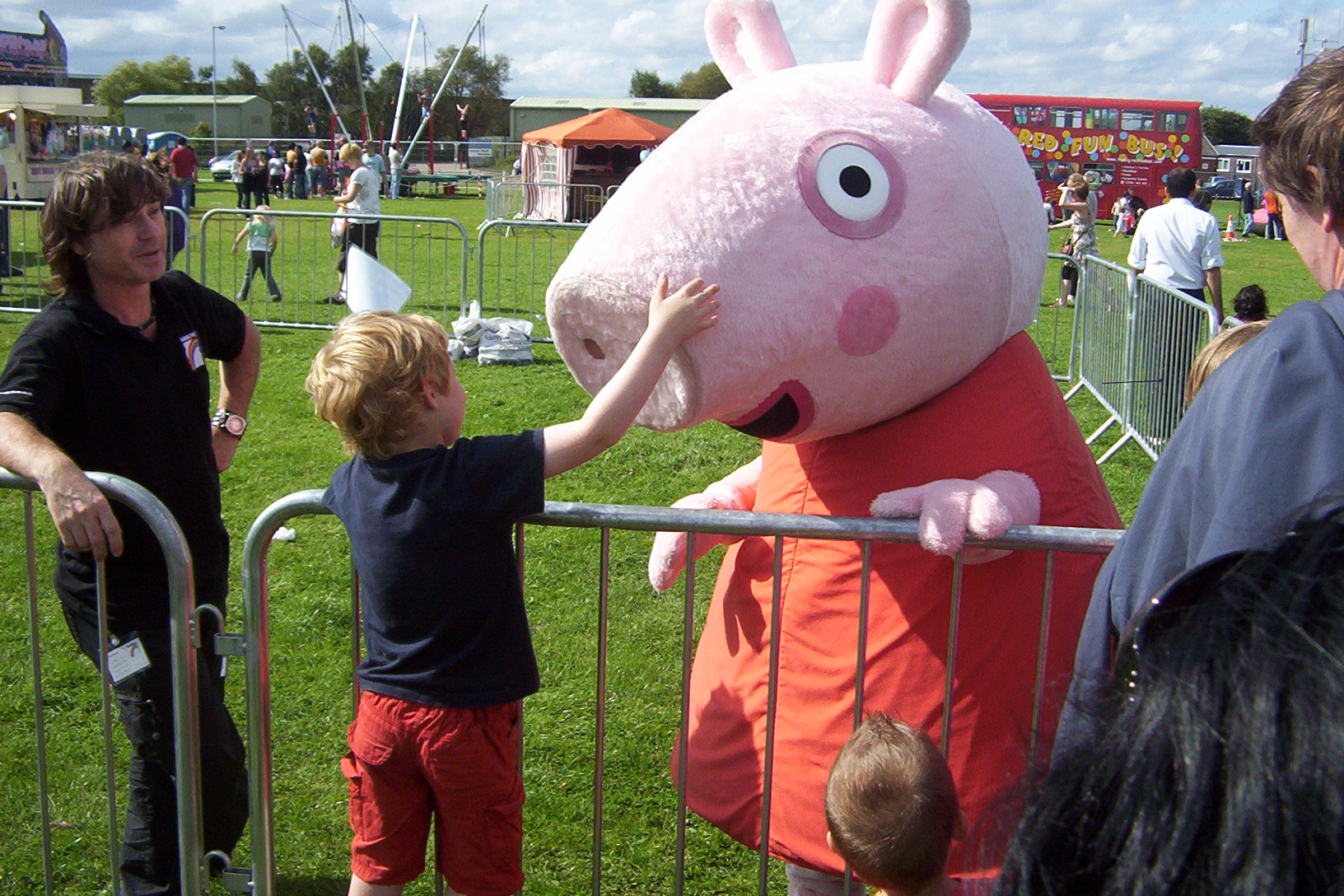
Peppa Pig at a personal appearance in the UK

==== Peppa Pig World ====
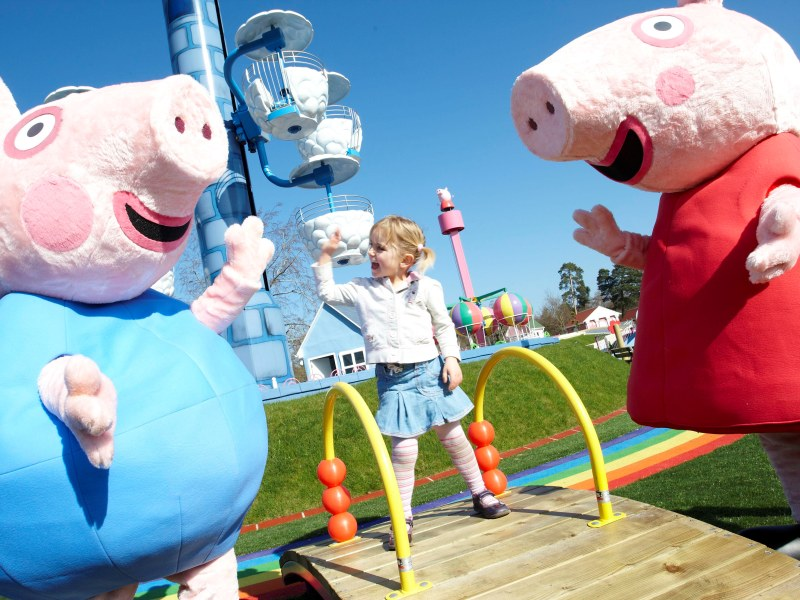
Peppa Pig World at Paultons Park, England

Peppa Pig World, a themed area based on the series, opened on 9 April 2011 at Paultons Park, New Forest, Hampshire, England, with nine rides, an indoor play zone, a muddy puddles water splash park, children-sized play areas, and themed buildings.

==== Peppa Pig World of Play ====
On 17 October 2017, Merlin Entertainments announced a partnership with Entertainment One to become the exclusive licensor for theme park attractions based on the show worldwide except in the United Kingdom and in China, which will be a non-exclusive partnership.

The deal began with the announcement of Peppa Pig World of Play on 5 June 2018, which are indoor play areas with unique twists. The first venue to open would be in Shanghai for a Late-2018 opening, and opened in Late-October. Additional venues in Beijing (never opened), as well as two US venues in Dallas-Fort Worth and Michigan were also announced around this time for a 2019 opening. The Dallas-Fort Worth venue opened in February 2019. while the Michigan venue opened later on in the year. Another Peppa Pig World of Play venue opened in Chicago in 2021.

In September 2021, a Peppa Pig World of Play venue was announced to open in the Netherlands.

As of 2024, there are five locations:

- Schaumburg, Illinois (a suburb of Chicago)
- Grapevine, Texas (Dallas / Fort Worth)
- Leidschendam, Netherlands (near The Hague)
- Auburn Hills, Michigan (a suburb of Detroit)
- Shanghai

==== Peppa Pig Land ====
Peppa Pig Land is located at two parks, Gardaland in Italy, and Heide-Park in Germany, both of which opened in 2018.

==== Peppa Pig Theme Park ====
Peppa Pig Theme Park is a separately ticketed park located within the Legoland Florida Resort; it opened on 24 February 2022.

The second Peppa Pig Theme Park, Peppa Pig Park Günzburg, was announced in June 2023. It is located in Günzburg, Germany within the Legoland Deutschland Resort and is the first standalone theme park based on the series in Europe. The park opened on 19 May 2024.

A third Peppa Pig Theme Park opened in North Richland Hills, Texas on 1 March 2025.

==== Lego Duplo Peppa Pig (Themed Area) ====
On 23 January 2024, a themed-play area dedicated to the Lego Duplo Peppa Pig subtheme was added to Legoland Billund Resort.

==== Peppa Pig Store ====
On 18 October 2024, Hasbro announced that they would open a dedicated Peppa Pig retail store within Battersea Power Station alongside a stand-alone Transformers store within the same premises. The store contains exclusive items and merchandise, a large TV screen, various interactive opportunities and Peppa meet-and-greets.

==== Peppa Pig Resort ====
On 23 June 2021, Merlin announced a dedicated Peppa Pig-themed resort located in Sichuan for a planned opening in 2024. It will contain a theme park, a hotel and a Sea Life aquarium. Construction began in July 2021.

=== Merchandise ===
Peppa Pig, the Entertainment One (eOne) brand, grossed over £200 million in UK merchandise sales in 2010, doubling the 2009 figure of £100 million. According to NPD figures for 2010, Peppa Pig had become the number one pre-school property in the total toy market, moving up four places from its 2009 position. As of May 2018 Peppa Pig was stated to have over 1,000 licensees worldwide, and 80 in the US, up from 63 licensees in 2010.

Episode DVDs and a variety of licensed Peppa Pig products including video games and other toys such as playsets, playing cards, vehicles, and stuffed toys are sold. The range was expanded to include household items such as bathroom products, stationery, bed-linen, food, drink, clothing, and jewellery. A music album titled My First Album was released in July 2019.

==== Lego Duplo Peppa Pig ====
On 23 January 2024, as part of the three-way partnership between The Lego Group, Hasbro and Merlin Entertainments, a dedicated Peppa Pig Lego Duplo theme was released as part of the series' 20th anniversary.

=== Video games ===
There have been several video games based on the property. In 2008, Pinnacle Software signed a deal with Contender Entertainment Group to publish licensed video games based on the property with Asylum Entertainment as developer. The first title, Peppa Pig: The Game, was released for the Nintendo DS handheld game system in November 2008. Following Pinnacle's insolvency in December that year, a successor company - P2 Games, was founded in February 2009, and released a version for the Wii console a year later on 27 November 2009, with distribution by Ubisoft. It is a children's video game that contains 11 games and activities.

Peppa Pig: Fun and Games was released on 22 October 2010 for the Wii and Nintendo DS. Asylum Entertainment and P2 Games remained as developer and publisher for the title. Peppa Pig: Theme Park Fun was released on 25 March 2011 for the Nintendo DS. It was also published by P2 Games, with Strawdog Studios serving as developer.

My Friend Peppa Pig was developed by Petoons Studio and published by Outright Games. It released on 22 October 2021 for the PlayStation 4, Xbox One, Nintendo Switch, and Windows, exactly 11 years after Peppa Pig: Fun and Games. Peppa Pig: World Adventures, also developed by Petoons Studio and published by Outright Games, was released on 17 March 2023 for the PlayStation 4, PlayStation 5, Xbox One, Xbox Series X and Series S, Nintendo Switch and Windows. The London section of the game is dedicated to Queen Elizabeth II, who had died on 8 September 2022.

=== Postage stamps ===
On 16 May 2024, the Royal Mail issued 8 stamps commemorating the 20th anniversary of Peppa Pig.

=== Cameos in other media ===
On 27 February 2025, Hasbro announced a new lineup of episodes where Mummy Pig would be expecting a new baby piglet. The news was broken in the United States through Kylie Kelce's podcast Not Gonna Lie and in the United Kingdom on the ITV breakfast programme Good Morning Britain though an especially animated segment featuring Mummy Pig being interviewed "live" by GMB's Richard Arnold, with Peppa making a small appearance during the interview. The show was used again on 20 May 2025 to officially reveal the baby pig, who is named Evie.

== Criticism and analysis ==
Comparison of identical frame in original (top) and re-edited versions of the Series 1 episode "Bicycles", with cycle helmets added

The characters of this show did not wear seat belts in cars in the first two series. After receiving several complaints, Astley Baker Davies announced that all future animation would include characters wearing seat belts, and that the relevant scenes in the first two series would be reanimated to include them. Similar changes were also made to add cycle helmets to early episodes with characters riding bicycles.

Peppa was used to promote the pre-2010 Labour government's Sure Start programme, which had the aim of "giving children the best possible start in life". In April 2010, during the UK General Election campaign, E1 Entertainment said that Peppa would not attend the launch of the Labour Party's families manifesto "in the interests of avoiding any controversy or misunderstanding".

In 2012, the Australian Broadcasting Corporation received a complaint that the Series 1 episode "Mister Skinnylegs" was not appropriate for Australian audiences, as it proclaimed spiders are harmless and indirectly encouraged befriending spiders; deadly venomous spiders are prevalent in Australia. The complaint was upheld, and the episode was restricted from airing on the ABC network.

In late May 2014, the ABC's Mark Scott expressed fears about the future of Peppa on Australian television, given Australian federal budget cuts to ABC funding that were said to affect its ability to pay for, and broadcast, overseas media products such as Peppa Pig. Australian media noted the character's appeal to Australian toddlers and echoed concerns about the future of her Australian distribution rights. Australian Federal Agriculture Minister Barnaby Joyce made reference to the character as a menu item at a Thai restaurant, while conservative columnist Piers Akerman thought that Peppa "pushes a weird feminist line". On 28 May 2014, Minister for Communications Malcolm Turnbull tweeted: "Contrary to media rumours, Peppa's is one snout we are happy to have in the ABC trough".

In 2015 Norman Lamb, a former UK health minister, said that programmes such as Peppa Pig should include gay characters, because having arbitrary boundaries as to what relationships are acceptable in children's television was "not equitable".

The British Medical Journal carried a light-hearted article in its Christmas 2017 edition, which suggested that although the programme includes numerous "positive public health messages, encouraging healthy eating, exercise, and road safety", it ran the risk of "contributing to unrealistic expectations of primary care" by depicting general practitioner Doctor Brown Bear as making out-of-hours home visits as soon as contacted about apparently trivial illnesses, and dispensing medicines rather too freely. The media company responsible for Peppa Pig offered no comment when contacted about the article by the BBC.

In November 2021, UK Prime Minister Boris Johnson speaking at a Confederation of British Industry conference lost his place in his speech for about 20 seconds and diverted into a lengthy tangent about Peppa Pig, describing the character's shape as a "Picasso-like hairdryer".

=== "Peppa Pig effect" ===
Since 2019, it has been observed that children in the United States, where Peppa Pig had become an extremely popular programme, had been acquiring some British English pronunciation and vocabulary used in the show rather than their native American English. For example, tomato and zebra are pronounced differently, words such as petrol (instead of gasoline) and biscuit (instead of cookie) are used, and comments such as "how clever", "oh dear" and "can I have a go?" picked up. This phenomenon was not an issue for many parents; it trended with the hashtag "#PeppaEffect". Linguistics experts find those conclusions to be "likely exaggerated". A written statement by Entertainment One Ltd. when asked of this phenomenon went on saying: "Young Peppa fans see her as a friend... and, as we do with friends that we admire, pick up some of their characteristics... imitation is the sincerest form of flattery."

== Popularity in China ==
Peppa Pig is popular in mainland China, and has been featured by official news media such as People's Daily, and even endorsed by the People's Liberation Army and Chinese weapons manufacturer Norinco. However, social media posts featuring concerned parents complaining about Peppa Pig have also gone viral. In May 2018, digitally manipulated adult content featuring Peppa Pig was blocked on the video app TikTok, also known as Douyin in China. According to some media estimates, some 30,000 clips referenced under "#PeppaPig" were removed by the site. The ban was in response to the prevalence of adult content featuring Peppa Pig created by shehuiren (simplified Chinese: 社会人; traditional Chinese: 社會人; pinyin: shè huì rén; literally "person of society") subculture, which used Peppa Pig as a criminal "mobster" icon, with members of the subculture creating memes and tattoos using imagery from the cartoon, containing adult humour. Original Peppa Pig cartoons remain accessible on all online platforms, including TikTok (Douyin).

Despite the controversy regarding its memes, the series and character remain popular within mainland Chinese culture, as two Peppa Pig theme parks in Beijing and Shanghai have been opened in 2019. In early 2019, to celebrate the Year of the Pig, the 81-minute animation/live-action film Peppa Pig Celebrates Chinese New Year was released in China. Before the film's release, a five-minute live-action promotional trailer went viral on social media in China, garnering a billion views and being re-posted by numerous state media outlets. The film opened on 5 February 2019, and made US$14 million in the first three days.

Peppa Pig: Perfect Holiday (Simplified Chinese: 小猪佩奇：完美假期; Traditional Chinese: 小豬佩奇：完美假期; pinyin: Xiǎo Zhū Pèi Qí: Wánměi Jiàqī) is a 3D animated film produced in China, released in Chinese theaters on 1 October 2026.

== Awards and nominations ==
Awards

- British Academy Children's Awards
  - 2012, Winner for Best Pre-School Animation
  - 2011, Winner for Best Pre-School Animation
  - 2011, Winner for Best Performer (Harley Bird)
  - 2005, Winner for Best Pre-School Animation series
- Annecy International Animated Film Festival 2005, Winner of the Grand Prize, The Crystal for Best TV Production
- Bradford Animation Film Festival 2005, Winner of Best Children's Animation Series
- Cartoons on the Bay Festival 2005, Winner of Pulcinella Award for Best European Programme of the Year
- Cartoons on the Bay Festival 2005, Winner of Pulcinella Award for Best Pre-School Series
- Cartoons on the Bay Festival 2005, Children's audience award for Best Pre-School series

Nominations

- British Academy Children's Awards
  - 2013, Nomination for Best Pre-School Animation
  - 2013, Nomination for Best Writing
  - 2013, Nomination for Best Multiplatform (Peppa Pig's Holiday game)
  - 2010, Nomination for Best Pre-School Animation
  - 2010, Nomination for Best Writing
  - 2009, Nomination for Best Pre-School Animation
  - 2009, Nomination for Best Writing
  - 2008, Nomination for Best Pre-School Animation
  - 2007, Nomination for Best Pre-School Animation
  - 2004, Nomination for Best Pre-School Animation

== Discography ==
=== Studio albums ===
Title	Album details	Peak chart positions			Certifications
Title	Album details	UK	SCO	IRL	Certifications
My First Album	Released: 19 July 2019; Label: eOne; Format: Digital download, streaming	79	26	91	BPI: Gold
Peppa's Adventures: The Album	Released: 30 July 2021; Label: eOne; Format: Digital download, streaming	—	—	—	
Peppa's Club: The Album	Released: 18 November 2022; Label: eOne; Format: Digital download, streaming	—	—	—	

=== Singles ===
Title	Album	Released
"Theme Music From Peppa Pig"	Theme Music EP	1 April 2016
"Bing Bong Zoo"	My First Album	14 June 2019
"Bing Bong Christmas"	Non-album single	25 October 2019
"Birdy Birdy Woof Woof"	Non-album single	29 January 2021
"Recycling"	Non-album single	18 March 2021
"Bing Bong Champion"	Peppa's Adventures: The Album	11 June 2021
"Peppa's Adventures"	Peppa's Adventures: The Album	2 July 2021
"Pumpkin Party"	Non-album single	1 October 2021
"Christmas Muddy Puddles"	Non-album single	12 November 2021
"Look In A Book"	Peppa's Club: The Album	2 February 2022
"Our Big Day Out"	Peppa's Club: The Album	25 February 2022
"Gardening With Grandpa"	Peppa's Club: The Album	22 April 2022
"Roller Disco"	Peppa's Club: The Album	20 May 2022
"Bestest Daddy In The World"	Peppa's Club: The Album	17 June 2022
"Peppa's Club"	Peppa's Club: The Album	15 July 2022
"My Friend Peppa"	Peppa's Club: The Album	29 July 2022
"Time For Bed"	Peppa's Club: The Album	9 September 2022
"Feeling Calm"	Peppa's Club: The Album	7 October 2022

=== Extended plays ===
Title	EP details
Theme Music EP	Released: 1 April 2016; Type: 2-track EP
Peppa's Club	Released: 15 July 2022; Type: 6-track EP
