= British Academy Children's Awards 2022 =

Awards ceremony

25th British Academy Children's Awards
- Date: 27 November 2022
- Site: Old Billingsgate, London
- Hosted by: Lindsey Russell

Highlights
- Most awards: The Snail and the Whale (2)
- Most nominations: Dodger and The Snail and the Whale (3 each)

The 25th Annual British Academy Children's Awards were held on 27 November 2022, presented by the British Academy of Film and Television Arts (BAFTA) to recognize achievements in British television targeted to children and young people. The ceremony took place at Old Billingsgate in London and was hosted by television and radio presenter Lindsey Russell.

The ceremony marks the return of the awards after a three-year absence. The eligibility period ran from 1 July 2019 to 30 June 2022. The nominations were announced on 25 October 2022 with CBBC series Dodger and BBC One animated television film The Snail and the Whale leading the list with three each.

== Winners and nominees ==
The nominees were announced on 25 October 2022. The winners are listed first and in bold.

Animation	Feature Film
**The Snail and the Whale (BBC One)**; Hilda (Netflix); Robin Robin (Netflix); The Tiger Who Came to Tea (Channel 4)	**Wolfwalkers (Cartoon Saloon / Apple TV+)**; Klaus (Netflix); The Mitchells vs. the Machines (Netflix); Over the Moon (Netflix)
Pre-School – Animation	Pre-School – Live Action
**Hey Duggee (CBeebies)**; Circle Square (Channel 5); Pip and Posy (Channel 5 / Sky Kids); The Very Small Creatures (Sky Kids)	**Lovely Little Farm (Apple TV+)**; Andy's Aquatic Adventures (CBeebies); Grace's Amazing Machines (CBeebies); Something Special (CBeebies)
Non-Scripted	International
**FYI Ukraine Invasion Special (Sky Kids)**; Crackerjack! (CBBC); Deadly (franchise)#Deadly 60 (CBBC); Gym Stars (CBBC)	**Bluey (Disney Junior)**; City of Ghosts (Netflix); Kiri and Lou (CBeebies); Maya and the Three (Netflix)
Content for Change	Game
**El Deafo (Apple TV+)**; Ada Twist, Scientist (Netflix); Only a Child (YouTube); Waffles + Mochi (Netflix)	**Sackboy: A Big Adventure (Sumo Digital / Sony Interactive Entertainment)**; Astro's Playroom (Team Asobi / Sony Interactive Entertainment); Lego Star Wars: The Skywalker Saga (Traveller's Tales / Warner Bros. Interactive Entertainment); Ratchet & Clank: Rift Apart (Insomniac Games / Sony Interactive Entertainment)
Scripted	Presenter
**Dodger (CBBC)**; Jamie Johnson (CBBC); My Mum Tracy Beaker (CBBC); Silverpoint (CBBC)	**George Webster – CBeebies Presentation (CBeebies)**; Braydon Bent – FYI Investigates: Brazil – Children Caught in the Crossfire (Sky Kids); YolanDa Brown – YolanDa's Band Jam (CBeebies); Hamza Yassin – Let's Go for a Walk (CBeebies)
Performer	Young Performer
**Chris O'Dowd as Finn's Dad on Here We Are: Notes for Living on Planet Earth (Apple TV+)**; Justin Fletcher as Mr. Tumble on Mr Tumble's Busy Bus Day (CBeebies); Cathy Tyson as Gran Gran on JoJo & Gran Gran (CBeebies); Julie Walters as Granny on Terry Pratchett's The Abominable Snow Baby (Channel 4)	**Taiya Samuel as JoJo on JoJo & Gran Gran (CBeebies)**; Bobby Beynon as Jonathan Brown on The Adventures of Paddington (Nick Jr.); Ella Bright as Darell Rivers on Malory Towers (CBBC); Keaton Edmund as Freddie Seo on Jamie Johnson (CBBC)
Director	Writer
**The Snail and the Whale – Max Lang, Daniel Snaddon (BBC One)**; Shaun the Sheep: The Flight Before Christmas – Steve Cox (Netflix / BBC One); The Amazing World of Gumball – Mic Graves (Cartoon Network); Dodger – Rhys Thomas (CBBC)	**The Amazing World of Gumball – Joe Markham, Mic Graves, Tony Hull (Cartoon Network)**; The Snail and the Whale – Max Lang, Suzanne Lang (BBC One); Dodger – Lucy Montgomery, Rhys Thomas (CBBC); Silverpoint – Lee Walters. Silverpoint (CBBC)
