= King Arthur's Disasters =

British children's television series

- Starring: Rik Mayall; Matt Lucas; Morwenna Banks; Phil Cornwell
- Countries of origin: United Kingdom; Spain
- Original language: English
- No. of seasons: 2
- No. of episodes: 26 (list of episodes)

Production
- Executive producer: Genevieve Dexter
- Running time: 30 mins (approx.)
- Production company: Neptuno Films

Original release
- Network: CITV
- Release: 11 April 2005 – 1 February 2006

King Arthur's Disasters is a British animated series which first aired on CITV. Co-created by Paul Parkes and Will Ashurst, the series follows and depicts attempts by King Arthur (voiced by Rik Mayall), assisted by the wizard Merlin (voiced by Matt Lucas), to woo the beautiful self-obsessed Princess Guinevere (voiced by Morwenna Banks). Due to the popularity of the show, it was picked up for a second series which began transmission on CITV from 6 November 2005. Both were executive-produced by Genevieve Dexter at Cake Entertainment.

King Arthur's Disasters was the highest-rated new CITV show during spring 2005. It regularly achieved an audience share of over 20% of children and it regularly won its time slot against CBBC. In 2006 the show was nominated for a children's BAFTA for Best Animation; however, it lost to The Amazing Adrenalini Brothers.

== Story ==
Princess Guinevere requests a certain object, animal, or being which she apparently desperately wants or truly has need of. Arthur accepts, in return for her agreed hand in marriage. Arthur, usually accompanied by Merlin, will set off on a quest which sometimes included other people to gain the item required. He is beset by numerous dangers before finally reaching his goal, however something will always ruin it or its effects and Guinevere will never be pleased, or if she is, soon after she will be displeased. The enemies to the king are his two rebellious knights, Sir Launcelot and Sir Martyn, who constantly quarrel between each other but share the king as a common enemy.

== Characters ==
The show uses a stock series of characters drawn from the popular reception of the Arthurian Legend, and whose most notable features demonstrate the influences of 20th century, rather than medieval incarnations of the knights. The main recurring characters are:

- Arthur (Rik Mayall), the eponymous king whose disasters provide the main plot motivation.
- Guinevere (Morwenna Banks), the archetypal bored princess whom her creators describe as "the Paris Hilton of her generation". While having no intentions of actually marrying Arthur, she uses her hold over him to will him into finding her the things she desires; water from the fountain of youth, a winter palace, a golden bear, and so on. In the later episodes, however, she really starts to love Arthur. Guinevere is so self-absorbed, sometimes she doesn't even notice Arthur's absence.
- Merlin (Matt Lucas), Arthur's only faithful servant, whose bumbling manner might hide a devious, brilliant mind... or might not.
- Launcelot (Phil Cornwell), Arthur's first knight, who resembles nothing so much as a fusion of James Bond and Terry-Thomas. Holding a grudge since a childhood dispute, Launcelot seeks any occasion to rid himself of Arthur and usurp the vacant throne; a trope which leads him to heartily encourage Arthur's more perilous quests, and recalls Steve Barron's Merlin TV series, transferring the adultery theme to a more 'child-friendly' comic equivalent.
- Lady 'M (Margret), is King Arthur's cunning older sister. She has claimed to live in France. (In the episode Glass Rose, King Arthur stayed at her castle in France.) Unknown to Arthur, her brother she is also the famous Sir Margret who is liked by townsfolk. She does things for the benefit of the townsfolk as seen in Glass Rose. She has come to Arthur and Guinevere's rescues a couple of times in a few episodes as Sir Margret. She made her first appearance in the episode Glass Rose.
- Robin Hood (Phil Cornwell), a cheery denizen of the forest who (along with his not so merry men) serves as an antagonist to Arthur since an encounter with the Singing Oak Tree and the ruse of a cunning pig... While technically speaking, the character is an anachronism (depending on which Arthurian source a viewer prefers), the inclusion of Robin Hood is not without precedent in Arthurian films, since Nathan Juran's Siege of the Saxons included a Robin-esque character, and the backdating of Robin places him within broadly the same time period as Chrétien de Troyes, who was writing his Arthurian legends (late 12th Century). His voice was based on Tony Blackburn.
- Sir Martyn, a deliberately anachronistic (or perhaps anatopistic) insertion into the legend, perhaps an homage to Akira Kurosawa whose Seven Samurai present a similarity with occidental medieval knights.
- Splag, Arthur's only loyal knight, who is a stocky brute capable of only monosyllabic grunts.
- Alan, Arthur's horse.

== Episodes ==
=== Series 1 (2005) ===
No.	Title	Original release date
1	"Splinters in the Knight"	11 April 2005
The ears of the people of Camelot are at the mercy of Princess Guinevere's terrible drumming. King Arthur visits her and offers to buy her lessons, however she's not convinced she needs any. Knowing he'd do literally anything for her she manages to turn it around and Arthur gets tricked, into getting her a Branch from the Singing Oak Tree. In the meantime Merlin is at war with a couple of squirrels, leaving Arthur to accomplish this quest on his own. However, he finds the task difficult as the Oak Tree is being protected by Robin Hood and his merry men and women.
2	"The Yodelling Dolphin of Kirkwall"	18 April 2005
King Arthur and Merlin set sail for Dolphin Rock in the Scottish waters near Kirkwall to collect Guinevere's latest desire – the Yodelling Dolphin. King Arthur's problems have only just begun when he discovers that hearing the Dolphin's yodel causes one to dance to death.
3	"The Parchment of Arusella"	25 April 2005
Arthur visits Guinevere, requesting her hand in marriage, once again. She then makes an excuse that he must ask her Father's permission if he wishes to marry her. But then somehow manipulates Arthur into getting The Parchment of Arusella for her, so she can give it to her Father on Father's Day.
4	"The Labyrinth of Lost Souls"	3 May 2005
After escaping from Robin Hood and his merry gang, King Arthur visits Guinevere so he can take cover from Robin. However she tries to send him on another quest, this time she wants him to turn her slipper into gold.
5	"The Surprise Quest"	10 May 2005
Arthur's loyal magician, Merlin, has discovered a potion which makes the person one gives it to fall head-over-heels in love with them. Arthur plans to catapult the potion at Guinevere so she'll finally marry him, but he accidentally hits her chaperon, Petal.
6	"The Glass Rose"	17 May 2005
King Arthur, Merlin and Splag arrive at a French chateau on their way to steal the fabled 'Rose en Verre', a radiantly beautiful stained glass window installed in a remote Chateau in the heart of France.
7	"The Viking Venture"	24 May 2005
Princess Guinevere has ordered an expensive, stylish table from Norway and Arthur has to go and collect it for her. As usual he visits his trusted friend Merlin for advice, and Merlin ends up going on the expedition. However they have to keep it a secret that the King is leaving in case anybody attempts to take over the throne during his absence.
8	"Mission Implausible"	31 May 2005
King Arthur decides to invade Scotland when he discovers Princess Guinevere has been taken to Hadrian's castle. Unfortunately, the King's armies are sent in the wrong direction.
9	"The Fountain of Youth"	7 June 2005
Arthur is alerted to the screams of Guinevere, and he goes to see what is troubling her. Through her tears she tells Arthur that she has plucked a grey hair from her head and worries that she is getting old and tells him to do something. Arthur quickly seeks advice from Merlin who speaks of the fabled Fountain of Youth.
10	"Circus Calamity"	14 June 2005
Guinevere needs a temporary chaperone and King Arthur and Merlin travel to Baden-Baden to fetch Petal's cousin, Tatiana, a trapeze artist at Countess Griselda's International Circus.
11	"The Bear Necessities"	21 June 2005
Princess Guinevere wants a pet and decides that the tiny Golden Bear of Tundoor would fit her lifestyle perfectly. But the eerie forest of Tundoor is home to the wicked sorceress Morgan Le Fay who becomes somewhat annoyed when King Arthur inadvertently destroys her cottage.
12	"The Peacocks of Penzance"	28 June 2005
The 'Peacocks of Penzance' are regarded by many as myth. However, that doesn't deter Arthur from seeking a quill from one so that he can write to Guinevere's cousin.
13	"The Ice Palace"	5 July 2005
Guinevere demands an ice palace, however not just any ice palace. So Arthur travels to Switzerland via high mountains, avalanches, cracking river ice, an abominable snowman and running afoul of William Tell.

=== Series 2 (2005-2006) ===
No.	Title	Original release date
14	"The Forest of Dark Forces"	6 November 2005
Princess Guinevere's greatest desire is to fly and King Arthur provides her with the first medieval hot air Balloon. The balloon sails across the sky until Robin Hood accidentally shoots it down over the foreboding Forest of Dark Forces. King Arthur and Robin Hood will have to sneak past the dreaded Purple Knights, survive the terrors of the Dark Forces and defeat the Screaming Salisbury Stag to rescue the fair Princess from certain doom.
15	"King of the Moon"	7 November 2005
Moon rocks are all the rage and King Arthur is convinced he has traveled to the moon via a one-way rocket. While Sir Launcelot and Sir Martyn struggle to share the throne in the King's absence, Arthur, Merlin and Splag are captured by the fierce 'moon people' and do battle with the gigantic rock giant, Ritho, in order to bring Princess Guinevere a moon rock all the way from – North Wales.
16	"King Guinevere"	13 November 2005
Merlin's magic goes astray and King Arthur switches bodies with the fair Princess Guinevere. Riding side-saddle and constrained by a corset, the King must find the fabled Slamming Book that contains the reversal spell, all without breaking any of Guinevere's nails.
17	"The Quest for the Orange Orange"	14 November 2005
All Princess Guinevere wants is an orange. However King Arthur must enter the Camelot Horse Show, travel across Spain, participate in the first 'running of bulls' in Pamplona, and single-handedly battle the Giant Two-Headed Fire-Breathing Orange-Eating Bull of Valencia.
18	"Worms of Regret"	20 November 2005
Guinevere has traveled to Paris to have a dress designed by the famous but neurotic Antoine de la Poulet. He insists on the very best material, so King Arthur is dispatched to a tropical jungle to retrieve the rare bloodsucking silk worms of Rangoon. Meanwhile, the French peasants are having one of their many revolutions and, on his return with the worms, the King discovers that Guinevere has been taken to the infamous tower prison known as the Pastille.
19	"A Tower with a View"	21 November 2005
Princess Guinevere pines for a sea view, so King Arthur and Merlin seek out King Canute for advice. They catapult the famous 'round table' into the sea to block the Penzance Plug Hole. The sea rises and keeps rising until Guinevere's tower is in danger of being engulfed.
20	"The Salmon of Knowledge"	27 November 2005
Princess Guinevere wants to choose a husband wisely and King Arthur volunteers to travel to Ireland and bring back the legendary Salmon of Knowledge. His efforts are hampered by Robin Hood and his Merry Band, numerous Leprechauns and two Merlin clones.
21	"The Rocket Man"	28 November 2005
When Princess Guinevere wants a firework display, King Arthur and Merlin rush to a remote mountain top in the Himalayas where The Fire Dragon, an old school chum of Merlin's, makes the best fireworks in the known world.
22	"Baa Baa Green Goat"	4 December 2005
Merlin has devised a magic spell that allows King Arthur to read his beloved's mind. Awed by his anticipation of her every whim, Princess Guinevere sends him to get the thing she desires most. Unfortunately her mind keeps changing.
23	"Double Double Wizzard Trouble"	5 December 2005
Princess Guinevere worries that her nostrils might be slightly imperfect and King Arthur and Merlin travel to a Wizard's retreat to retrieve a magic mirror known as 'The Bride's Reflection'. But Arthur accidentally uncovers 'The Black Heart of Doom' – a mirror which releases an evil Merlin bent on destroying Arthur.
24	"A Dope on a Rope"	11 December 2005
Princess Guinevere decides to accept the King's proposal of marriage – provided he proposes on one knee on her tower balcony. But Petal thwarts Arthur's every effort to climb up there. Merlin suggest a magical rope trick, known only by a reclusive Hermit in the Mid-lands. Note: Through half of this episode, the narrator is on holiday and is relieved by a woman. The man returns at the castle bit when King Arthur stops half of the ending in which the female narrator interrupted his proposal with Guinvere saying that he wants the real narrator (calling him a "shanty bloke") to come back and retake the woman's job.
25	"Donkey Kong King"	12 December 2005
Princess Guinevere wishes to bathe in fresh donkey's milk, so once again Arthur finds himself in Spain transporting an ill-tempered donkey through the countryside. Here he meets the legendary Don Quixote, helps him battle a windmill, a lion and some rather disgusting tacos.
26	"Tournament of Terror"	1 February 2006
Believing that her Father has offered her hand in marriage to the winner of the Annual Camelot Tournament, Princess Guinevere begs Arthur to enter and win as, given the choices, she'd rather marry him. Merlin convinces Sir Margaret to train Arthur in the martial arts and after a series of painful mishaps declares him as ready as he'll ever be. With some help from Merlin's magic, Arthur defeats Sir Martyn in hand-to-hand combat, Robin Hood and William Tell in the archery contest and Sir Launcelot and Sir Margaret in the joust. Guinevere's father awards the King his most prized possession – a champion Hereford Bull.

== International broadcasts ==
Country	Channel	Date of Premiere
Australia	ABC1; ABC3; Nickelodeon	2005-2010 (inc. repeats)
New Zealand	Nickelodeon	2005-2010
France	Cartoon Network	2006
Mexico	Cartoon Network	2007
Russia	Cartoon Network; 2x2 (voiceover version)	2005–2008, 2012–2013
Portugal	Cartoon Network; RTP 2 (dubbed version); Boomerang	2005
India	Pogo	-
Italy	Disney Channel; Toon Disney	2005
Spain	Toon Disney; Disney Channel; Clan TVE; Disney Cinemagic	2005
United Kingdom	Nickelodeon; Nicktoons; POP	2005–2016
Germany	Nickelodeon	2005
Croatia	Nickelodeon	2005
Poland; Romania; Hungary	Boomerang	2008
Canada	Toon-A-Vision	2018
Sri Lanka	TV Derana	2021
