= Gran Gran =

Gran Gran may refer to:

- Gran Gran, the grandmother of JoJo in JoJo & Gran Gran
- Kanna, a character in the television series Avatar: The Last Airbender, also known as "Gran Gran"
