= British Academy Children's Award for Animation =

British Academy Children and Young People Award for
- Awarded for: The best animated content for children and young people six and over.
- Country: United Kingdom
- Presented by: British Academy of Film and Television Arts
- Currently held by: The Snail and the Whale (2022)
- Website: www.bafta.org/children

The British Academy Children and Young People Award for Animation is an award presented annually by the British Academy of Film and Television Arts (BAFTA). It is given to "animated content for children and young people six and over". It was first awarded at the 1st edition of the British Academy Children's Awards in 1996, with Welsh claymation-style series Gogs being the first recipient of the award.

Cartoon Network series The Amazing World of Gumball holds the record of most wins in the category with four, followed by Shaun the Sheep with two. The two shows are the only programs to win the award more than once. The Amazing World of Gumball is also the most nominated series with eight nominations for the award, followed by Shaun the Sheep with seven and Grizzly Tales for Gruesome Kids and Strange Hill High with three each.

Winners Yr Enwog Ffred, Room on the Broom and Revolting Rhymes, and nominee Robin Robin have also been nominated for the Academy Award for Best Animated Short Film. Additionally, Yr Enwog Ffred was also nominated for the BAFTA Award for Best Short Animation.

== Winners and nominees ==
=== 1990s ===
| Year | Program | Recipient(s) | Broadcaster |
|---|---|---|---|
| 1996 (1st) | Gogs | Deiniol Morris, Michael Mort | BBC |
| 1996 (1st) | The Animals of Farthing Wood | Elphin Lloyd-Jones, Phillipe Leclerc | BBC |
| 1996 (1st) | Earthworm Jim | Kathi Castillo, Roy Allen Smith | Kids' WB |
| 1996 (1st) | The Wind in the Willows | John Coates, Dave John Unwin, Ted Walker | CITV |
| 1997 (2nd) | Yr Enwog Ffred | John Coates, Catrin Unwin, Joanna Quinn | Channel 4 |
| 1997 (2nd) | The Treacle People | Iain Russell, Mike Furness | CITV |
| 1997 (2nd) | The Enchanted World of Brambly Hedge: "Winter Story: An Ice Palace Party" | Jackie Cockle, Brian Little | BBC One |
| 1997 (2nd) | Romuald the Reindeer | Robin Lyons, Wayne Thomas | BBC One |
| 1998 (3rd) | Kipper | Ginger Gibbons, Mike Stuart | CITV |
| 1998 (3rd) | Dennis the Menace | Christopher O'Hare, Tony Collingwood | BBC One |
| 1998 (3rd) | Gogs | Deiniol Morris, Michael Mort | BBC One |
| 1998 (3rd) | The World of Peter Rabbit and Friends: "The Tale of Pigling Bland" | John Coates, Dianne Jackson | BBC One |
| 1999 (4th) | The First Snow of Winter | Jackie Edwards, Graham Ralph | BBC |
| 1999 (4th) | The Bear | John Coates, Hilary Audus | Channel 4 |
| 1999 (4th) | Bybs | Hywel Griffith | S4C |
| 1999 (4th) | Spot | Clive Juster, Leo Nielsen | BBC |

=== 2000s ===
| Year | Program | Recipient(s) | Broadcaster |
|---|---|---|---|
| 2000 (5th) | The Foxbusters | Jon Doyle, John Offord | CITV |
| 2000 (5th) | Little Grey Rabbit | Jean Flynn, Claire Grey | CITV |
| 2000 (5th) | Rotten Ralph | Steve Jones, Sue Pugh | CBBC |
| 2000 (5th) | Sheeep | Ginger Gibbons | CBBC |
| 2001 (6th) | Animated Tales of the World: "Aunt Tiger" | Michael Mort | Channel 4 |
| 2001 (6th) | The Last Polar Bears | Marion Edwards, Alan Simpson | Carlton |
| 2001 (6th) | Rotten Ralph | | CBBC |
| 2001 (6th) | Sheeep | Ginger Gibbons, Kate Fawkes | CBBC |
| 2002 (7th) | The English Programme: Sir Gawain and the Green Knight | David Rane, Tim Fernée | BBC |
| 2002 (7th) | Angelina Ballerina | Ginger Gibbons, Roger McIntosh | CITV |
| 2002 (7th) | Animated Tales of the World: "Bad Baby Amy" | Edwina Von Stiegler, Anthony Lucas | Channel 4 |
| 2002 (7th) | The Cramp Twins | Peter Völkle, Carole Weitzman, Brian Wood | Cartoon Network |
| 2003 (8th) | Bob the Builder: "A Christmas to Remember" | Jackie Cockle, Sarah Ball | CBeebies |
| 2003 (8th) | Albie | Francis Vose | CITV |
| 2003 (8th) | Bounty Hamster | Helen Cohen, Graham Ralph | CITV |
| 2003 (8th) | Pongwiffy | Marion Edwards, Alan Simpson | CITV |
| 2004 (9th) | Brush Head | Jonathan Boseley, Andrew Williams, Dan Berlinka | Disney Channel |
| 2004 (9th) | The Blue Dragon | | Channel 4 |
| 2004 (9th) | Grizzly Tales for Gruesome Kids | | CITV |
| 2004 (9th) | Metalheads | | CBBC |
| 2005 (10th) | The Little Reindeer | Jonathan Peel, Dave Unwin | CITV / France 3 |
| 2005 (10th) | The Tale of Jack Frost | Neil Graham, Alastair Swinnerton | CBBC |
| 2005 (10th) | The Cramp Twins | Denise Green, Frank Gresham | Cartoon Network |
| 2005 (10th) | A Grizzly New Year's Tale: The Crystal Eye | | CITV |
| 2006 (11th) | The Amazing Adrenalini Brothers | David Hodgson, Dan Chambers, Claire Underwood | CITV / Cartoon Network |
| 2006 (11th) | Those Scurvy Rascals | Adam Shaw, Oliver Hyatt, Daniel Isman | Nickelodeon |
| 2006 (11th) | King Arthur's Disasters | Edward Bignell, Julian Scott | CITV |
| 2006 (11th) | The Koala Brothers: "Outback Christmas" | Peter Curtis, Tobias Fouracre | CBeebies / ABC Kids |
| 2007 (12th) | The Secret Show | Christopher O'Hare, Tony Collingwood, Andrea Tran | CBBC |
| 2007 (12th) | Charlie and Lola: "Christmas Special" | Claudia Lloyd, Kitty Taylor | CBeebies |
| 2007 (12th) | Ōban Star-Racers | Michael Lekes, Savin Yeatman-Eiffel | France 3 / Jetix |
| 2007 (12th) | Shaun the Sheep | Julie Lockhart, Chris Sadler, Richard Goleszowski | CBBC |
| 2008 (13th) | Charlie and Lola: "Autumn Special" | Claudia Lloyd, Kitty Taylor | CBeebies |
| 2008 (13th) | Eliot Kid | Samuel Kaminka, Didier Julia, Gilles Cazaux | TF1 / CBBC |
| 2008 (13th) | Skunk Fu! | Paul Young, Jordan Gaucher, Aidan Harte | CBBC / RTÉ One |
| 2008 (13th) | Shaun the Sheep | Julie Lockhart, Richard Goleszowski | CBBC |
| 2009 (14th) | Lost and Found | Sue Goffe, Philip Hunt | Channel 4 |
| 2009 (14th) | Art Sparks | Sharna Jackson, Greg McLeod, Myles McLeod | Tate Kids |
| 2009 (14th) | Chop Socky Chooks | Ben Lock, Christine Ponzevera, Sergio Delfino | Cartoon Network |
| 2009 (14th) | Horrid Henry | Lucinda Whiteley, Dave Unwin | CITV |

=== 2010s ===
| Year | Program | Recipient(s) | Broadcaster |
|---|---|---|---|
| 2010 (15th) | Shaun the Sheep | Gareth Owen, Richard Webber, Chris Sadler | CBBC |
| 2010 (15th) | Doctor Who: "Dreamland" | | BBC Two |
| 2010 (15th) | Horrid Henry | Lucinda Whiteley, Dave Unwin | CITV |
| 2010 (15th) | OOglies | Nick Hopkin | CBBC |
| 2011 (16th) | The Amazing World of Gumball | Joanna Beresford, Ben Bocquelet, Mic Graves | Cartoon Network |
| 2011 (16th) | Muddle Earth | Phil Chalk, Vincent James | CBBC |
| 2011 (16th) | Pet Squad | | CBBC |
| 2011 (16th) | Grizzly Tales | Sara Bor, Simon Bor, Jamie Rix | Nicktoons |
| 2012 (17th) | The Amazing World of Gumball | Joanna Beresford, Ben Bocquelet, Mic Graves | Cartoon Network |
| 2012 (17th) | The Gruffalo's Child | | BBC One |
| 2012 (17th) | The Amazing Adrenalini Brothers | | CITV / Cartoon Network |
| 2012 (17th) | The Mechanical Musical Marvel | Julie Boden, Chris Randall | Second Home Studios |
| 2013 (18th) | Room on the Broom | | BBC One |
| 2013 (18th) | The Amazing World of Gumball | Ben Bocquelet, Mic Graves, Sarah Fell | Cartoon Network |
| 2013 (18th) | The Snowman and the Snowdog | | Channel 4 |
| 2013 (18th) | Strange Hill High | Phil Chalk, Josh Weinstein, Kat Van Henderson | CBBC |
| 2014 (19th) | The Amazing World of Gumball | Ben Bocquelet, Mic Graves, Sarah Fell | Cartoon Network |
| 2014 (19th) | Shaun The Sheep | Richard Starzak, Jay Grace, John Woolley | CBBC |
| 2014 (19th) | Dennis the Menace and Gnasher | | CBBC |
| 2014 (19th) | Strange Hill High | | CBBC |
| 2015 (20th) | Shaun the Sheep | John Woolley, Steve Box, Lee Wilton | CBBC |
| 2015 (20th) | Mr. Bean: The Animated Series | | CITV |
| 2015 (20th) | The Amazing World of Gumball | Ben Bocquelet, Mic Graves, Sarah Fell | Cartoon Network |
| 2015 (20th) | Strange Hill High | Josh Weinstein, Kat Van Henderson, Geoff Walker | CBBC |
| 2016 (21st) | The Amazing World of Gumball | Ben Bocquelet, Mic Graves, Sarah Fell | Cartoon Network |
| 2016 (21st) | Shaun the Sheep: The Farmer's Llamas | | BBC One |
| 2016 (21st) | Stick Man | | BBC One |
| 2016 (21st) | Counterfeit Cat | Ben Marsaud, Sarah Mattingley | Disney XD / Teletoon |
| 2017 (22nd) | Revolting Rhymes | | BBC One |
| 2017 (22nd) | The Amazing World of Gumball | Ben Bocquelet, Mic Graves, Sarah Fell | Cartoon Network |
| 2017 (22nd) | Shaun the Sheep | Will Becher, John Woolley, Richard Starzak | CBBC |
| 2017 (22nd) | We're Going on a Bear Hunt | | Channel 4 |
| 2018 (23rd) | Not presented | | |
| 2019 (24th) | Hilda | Luke Pearson, Stephanie Simpson, Kurt Mueller | Netflix |
| 2019 (24th) | The Amazing World of Gumball | Ben Bocquelet, Mic Graves, Sarah Fell | Cartoon Network |
| 2019 (24th) | Danger Mouse | Aidan McAteer, Tim Searle, Chapman Maddox | CBBC |
| 2019 (24th) | The Demon's Head | | TrueTube |

=== 2020s ===
| Year | Program | Recipient(s) | Broadcaster |
|---|---|---|---|
| 2022 (25th) | The Snail and the Whale | | BBC One |
| 2022 (25th) | Hilda | | Netflix |
| 2022 (25th) | Robin Robin | Dan Ojari, Mikey Please, Helen Argo | Netflix |
| 2022 (25th) | The Tiger Who Came to Tea | Robin Shaw, Ruth Fielding, Camilla Deakin | Channel 4 |

- Note: The series that don't have recipients on the tables had Production team credited as recipients for the award or nomination.

== Multiple wins ==
| Wins | Program |
|---|---|
| 4 | The Amazing World of Gumball |
| 2 | Shaun the Sheep |

== Multiple nominations ==
| Nominations | Program |
|---|---|
| 8 | The Amazing World of Gumball |
| 7 | Shaun the Sheep |
| 3 | Grizzly Tales for Gruesome Kids |
| 3 | Strange Hill High |
| 2 | Gogs |
| 2 | Rotten Ralph |
| 2 | Sheeep |
| 2 | Animated Tales of the World |
| 2 | The Cramp Twins |
| 2 | The Amazing Adrenalini Brothers |
| 2 | Charlie and Lola |
| 2 | Horrid Henry |
| 2 | Hilda |
