= List of Gogs episodes =

This is a list of all the episodes of Gogs. The claymation animated television series began as a little-known show on the Welsh television channel S4C on 21 December 1993, complete with Welsh language subtitles and credits. The show was translated for English language audiences and received international attention and acclaim when it was shown on BBC2 at Christmas time on 21 December 1996. The following listings are for these latter, more well-known showings.

In 1997, a second series of a further eight episodes were aired specifically for an English-speaking audience, and were aired in the UK, US and Australia.

Gogs ended in 1998 after running for these two series, and a total of 13 episodes. Episodes were generally around five to six minutes long.

There was also a 30-minute-long special, Gogwana.

Selected episodes were made available on VHS. All 13 episodes are now available on a single DVD released 9 April 2001 and in the 2018 DVD and Blu-Ray vision for 12 January 2018.

== Summary ==
Series	Episodes	Originally aired	DVD release date
Series	Episodes	Originally aired	Region 2
1	5	1993	9 April 2001
2	8	1996	9 April 2001

== Series 1 (1993) ==
Title	Original airdate	Length	#
"Episode 1.1: Fire"	Welsh: 21 December 1993, 8.50pm (S4C Version); 21 December 1996, 8.50pm (BBC Wales Version)		1
The pilot episode tells the audience the names of the characters of the programme, including the Gog family clan and their main antagonist Ray the T-Rex, in the form of cave paintings. At the beginning of the episode, the Gog clan are huddled together at night on a cold, bleak, windswept landscape. The Gogs are getting up to their usual revolting, uncivilized activities and hitting each other. A freak storm breaks out, terrifying them all, except the crazy infant, Gwj, who finds it all amusing, causing the mother Ogla to kick Gwj off screen. The storm causes a withered tree to be hit by a bolt of lightning which then sets it on fire, giving the Gogs the inspiration to make fire for the first time. Dim-witted teenage caveman Ogo quickly and unexpectedly turns to scream right at the camera as his hand is burnt by putting it into the fire. As he screams, grandfather Gogas hits Ogo over he head with his club, and the clan go to sleep around the warmth of the fire. They awaken sleepily to a hungry T-Rex named Ray descending on them, and as the Gogs scream and flee they leave behind the teenage daughter, Igi, who is almost eaten. Ogo saves the day when he holds a flaming torch to Ray's private parts, causing Ray to dart off quickly in pain. As Ogo basks in his clan's praise, he quickly loses it again as he blows the flame out, which was the last remnant of the fire they had, and as such the secret of fire is lost. The rest of the clan beat up Ogo for this, and the next night they remain cold without fire like the night before.
"Episode 1.2: Stone Circle"	23 December 1993, 6.45pm (S4C Version); 23 December 1996, 18.45 (BBC Wales Version)		2
The second episode begins with Ray the T-Rex still searching for the Gogs, his pride (and private parts) wounded. Meanwhile, the Gogs have moved from the barren windswept plateau to a lush, bright, and gargantuan-sized primeval rainforest buzzing with all manner of bizarre flora and fauna. Baby Gwj is having a tantrum, screaming, defecating and urinating on the forest floor, causing the rest of the clan to shove rocks in their ears to drown out the sound, and vomiting at the stench. Mother Ogla wipes Gwj's buttocks on a banana leaf, and then throws it in husband Oglas's face. The day consists of many similar antics, until grandfather Gogas comes up with the idea of building a Stonehenge-like structure. The plan collapses when a giant, prehistoric forest spider latches onto Oglas' face, causing him to drop the first stone on his father Gogas. Nevertheless, the Gogs persevere, and although many similar mishaps upset the construction, the building is completed – which is in fact revealed to be an elaborate swing to keep Girj happy and stop his tantrums. Although it does indeed keep Gwj happy, it nonetheless makes him louder than ever in his excitement, driving the rest of them mad.
"Episode 1.3: Hunt"	24 December 1993, 8.20pm (S4C Version); 24 December 1996, 8.20pm (BBC Wales Version)		3
As the rest of the family sit around on a plateau, father and son team Oglas and Ogo decide to go on a hunting trip to the rainforest to fetch food for the hungry clan. Not surprisingly, the trip is a disaster full of misadventures, as Oglas and Ogo are not adept hunters. After they leave, a brontosaurus keels over dead next to the rest of the clan on the plateau, who then promptly feast upon it. Meanwhile, in the rainforest Oglas and Ogo bump into a red-skinned Therizinosauridae who beats them up with kung fu. They flee, only to bump into Ray the T-Rex, prompting more running. Oglas and Ogo escape Ray by jumping off a cliff but not before losing their clothes which Ray catches in his jaws. They land in the brontosaurus' rib cage and are trapped inside like a prison, naked, exhausted, beaten up and hungry, helplessly looking on at the rest of the clan who are soundly sleeping off their hearty brontosaurus meal.
"Episode 1.4: Cave"	25 December 1993, 3.00pm (S4C Version); 25 December 1996, 3.00pm (BBC Wales Version)		4
The clan are sat around on the plateau as grandfather Gogas chases after the mole. Ogo expels mucus everywhere and all over the rest of the clan, and Oglas beats him up for it, and Ogla breastfeeds Girj to stop him from screaming. A windstorm kicks up pace and the clan use giant leaves as a windbreak. Ogo climbs a tree to fetch such a leaf, but at the top of the tree he is attacked by a pterodactyl hiding in the leaves who picks him up with its claws and carries him off. Gogas throws a rock at the pterodactyl, which then drops Ogo down a hollow tree stump. The pterodactyl swoops down on Gogas but Gogas knocks it out with his club, and loses his clothes as he swings. A tornado bears down on the clan, and as they look on in horror, Oglas' brain puts on a hat and vacates his head. Baby Gwj escapes by following the mole down its hole. The rest of them take refuge in the tree stump to find a large cavern beneath, but Ogla gets stuck in the tree stump. After the mole saves Gwj, Gogas again attempts to whack it with his club, but the mole steals the club and hits Gogas with it.
"Episode 1.5: Earthquake"	26 December 1993, 11.20pm (S4C Version); 26 December 1996, 11.15pm (BBC Wales Version)		5
"Episode 1.6: Inventions"	27 December 1993, 6.50pm (S4C Version); 27 December 1996 6.30pm (BBC Wales Version)		6
"Episode 1.7: Trappers"	28 December 1993, 8.30pm (S4C Version); 28 December 1996 8.50pm (BBC Wales Version)		7

== Series 2 (1997) ==
Title	Original airdate	Length	#
"Episode 2.1: Illness"	1997		8
"Episode 2.2: Bear"	1997		9
"Episode 2.4: Gramps R.I.P."	1997		10
"Episode 2.5: Apes and Men"	1997		11
"Episode 2.6: Babysitting"	1997		12
"Episode 2.7: Snow"	1997		13

== Credits (from Series 1993 to 1996) ==
- Based on an Original Idea by: Deiniol Morris, Michael Mort, Siôn Jones
- Voices: Marie Clifford, Gillian Elisa, Dafydd Emyr, Rob Rackstraw, Nick Upton
- Music: Arwyn Davies
- Models: Michael Mort, Lorraine Ford
- Sets: Siôned Jones, Ian Harvey
- Titles: Steven Rowlandson
- Animation Accountant for HTV: Emlyn Penny-Jones
- Production Co-ordinator: Ann Gwynne
- Sound Design: ReelWorks
- Sound Mixing: Wild Tracks, Sounds in Motion
- Assistant Animators: Jody Meredith, Nigel Leach
- Executive Producers: Meirion Davies for S4C and Colin Rose for BBC
- Animated and Directed by: Deniol Morris, Michael Mort
- An Aaargh! Animation Ltd Production for S4C in Association with BBC Bristol
- Copyright S4C and HTV MCMXCIII to MCMXCVI.

== Gogwana (1998) ==
Title	Original air date	Length	#
"Gogwana"	25 December 1998, 1:27 pm	28 minutes	14
Gogwana was a half-hour-long special and the final installment of Gogs, with bigger vistas and special effects than the previous television series. This short film begins with a panoramic view of a wild and bleak landspace replete with all manner of creatures from Earth's history, many of which did not actually exist in the same environment or even the same time period. The Gog family clan are sat huddled together around a fire in a cave, getting up to their usual repulsive habits, until a fiery earthquake forces them to flee. As they leave the safety of the cave, their old enemy Ray the T-rex takes the opportunity to attempt to eat them. The baby Girj is almost eaten but saved by being carried upwards on a monolithic rock forcing its way out of the ground. The Gogs climb up a rocky cliff, and as Ray snaps at their heels, a rock falls on Ray's head, knocking him out. The land in turmoil, the Gogs have no choice but to move on, deciding to follow a bright light in the sky. Whilst walking through a desert, the Gogs wear fur on their feet to protect them from the scorching sands, although grandfather Gogas has none – so he jumps onto two furry creatures and uses them instead. The Gogs find the hollow carcass of a wayward woolly mammoth and take it for a new home, although even the Gogs find the fly-riddled rotten insides undesirable. Daughter Igi watches as vultures circle ahead, and befriends a baby vulture when it hatches from the egg. That night the dreams of grandfather Gogas are shown. They depict a glimpse of his past; how his son Oglas was conceived, and how Gogas' late wife was carried off by an army of diminutive, skull-wearing cannibals. As the Gogs continue to follow the shooting star in the sky, Ray the T-Rex continues his pursuit. The Gogs end up at a lush and verdant oasis, walking through, they pass a dead dimetrodon and volcanic vents blasting gases. They enter a nearby cave, only to discover it is the lair of the skull-wearing cannibals. Meanwhile, Igi remains outside, chasing the baby vulture who has escaped. She enters the cave only to find her family in a big cooking pot with the fires just lit by a guard, and being the smartest she runs off to hatch an elaborate escape plan. Just at that moment however, the cannibal's slave-like chef is revealed to be Gogas' long-lost wife he presumed dead, (she is also Oglas' mother), and she and Gogas recognize each other. When the broth is taken to the cannibal king, a freed Gogas bursts forth, club in hand, and he takes his revenge, with the help of his family. Meanwhile, Igi has used the air from volcanic vents to blow up the remains of the dead dimetrodon, and in so doing created a large makeshift hot air balloon. As the rest of the family are chased by the cannibals, Igi saves them with her contraption and the Gogs sail away in the sky to safety, Gogas reunited with his wife and Oglas with his mother. However, the cannibals have domesticated flying pteranodons, and are in hot pursuit. A battle occurs in the skies, cannibals jump on the dimetrodon balloon, trying to sabotage it and stop the Gogs. The Gogs are saved by the baby vulture, who attacks a cannibal trying to cut through the vines holding the carriage to the inflated dimetrodon. Igi unravels makeshift wings for the carriage and cuts the vines herself and they soar off, but not before setting off a fuse attached to the dimetrodon balloon. Within a minute the volcanic gases in the inflated dimetrodon explode, killing the cannibals who had swarmed over it. After a brief scuffle with Gogas, the cannibal king falls into the waiting jaws of Ray the T-Rex, who had been watching everything from ground level. The shooting star finally leads the Gogs to a Garden of Eden-type place, and includes a scene between Oglas and Ogla which is not unlike Adam, Eve, the Serpent and the forbidden fruit. The episode ends with the Gogs looking up at the sky, and they scream as they realise the shooting star is heading straight towards them.

== Credits/Production Staff ==
- Voices: Marie Clifford, Gillian Elisa, Dafydd Emyr, Josie Lawrence, Rob Rackstraw, Nick Upton
- Animation: Suzy Fagan, Jody Meredith, Mike Mort, Chris Sadler, Ian Whitlock, Terry Brain, Will Hodge, Jon Pinfield
- Animation Assistant: Alison Evans
- Production Manager: Jon Wigfield
- Production Coordinator: Ann Gwynne
- Production Accountant: Keith Evans
- Director of Photography: Paul Smith
- Camera Operators: Charles Copping, Toby Howell; Beth McDonald, Jon Gregory, Stephen Andrews
- Gaffer: Clive Scott
- Electricians: Carl Hulme, Jon Graves
- Supervising Modelmakers: Lorraine Mason, Nigel Leach
- Modelmakers: Marcus Noonan, Salinee Mukhood
- Sets: Farrington Lewis & Company Ltd
- Monitor Lizard: 'Fat Wally'
- Film Editor: Tamsin Parri
- Sound Design: Reel Works
- Dubbing Mixer: Graham Pickford
- Titles and Special Effects Video Post Production: Ocean Digital Pictures
- Telecine: Spirit Pictures
- Music Composed by: Arwyn Davies
- Music Arranged and Conducted by: Nic Raine
- Writers: Sion Jones, Deiniol Morris, Mike Mort, Joe Turner
- Executive Producers: Mike Mort, Deiniol Morris
- Executive Producer for S4C: Meirion Davies
- Executive Producer for the BBC: Colin Rose
- Produced by: Helen Nabarro
- Directed by: Deiniol Morris
- An Aaargh! and S4C production for BBC Bristol
- Copyright S4C and Aaargh! Animation Ltd and BBC Bristol MCMXCVIII. All rights reserved.
