= George Webster (presenter) =

English television presenter, actor, dancer and writer (born 2000)

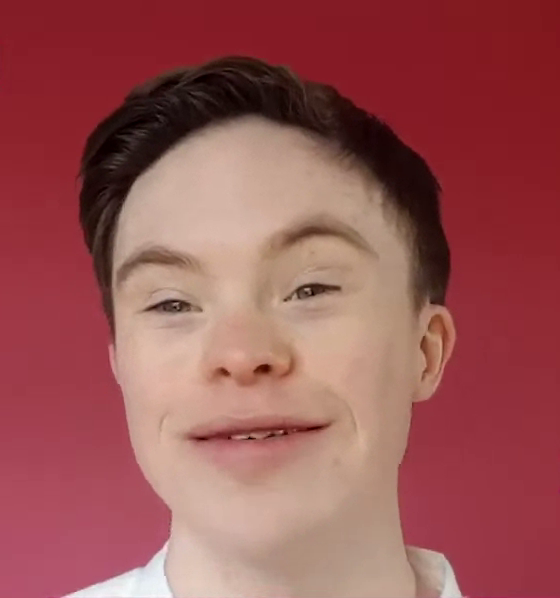
- Webster in 2021
- Born: 29 July 2000 (age 25); Rawdon, West Yorkshire, England
- Occupations: Television presenter; actor; dancer; writer
- Known for: Presenting CBeebies
- Awards: Best Presenter - British Academy Children's Award (2022)

George Webster (born 29 July 2000) is an English television presenter, actor, dancer and writer. He was discovered while volunteering at his local Parkrun by a Sky UK television crew, who made him the subject of an episode of Jessica's Parkrun Heroes in 2019. This film prompted Mencap to refer him to a filmmaker who was making S.A.M., a short film that was broadcast online in October 2020. After being scouted by the BBC, Webster recorded a video for BBC Bitesize, which went viral. He then began presenting for CBeebies, for which he won Best Presenter at the British Academy Children's Awards 2022. He has also appeared in The Railway Children Return, Casualty, World on Fire, and the 2022 Strictly Come Dancing Christmas special. From 2023, he began publishing books, and has released This Is Me and Why Not?.

== Early life ==
Webster was born on 29 July 2000 in Rawdon, West Yorkshire with Down syndrome. Growing up, he struggled to enunciate properly, prompting him and his family to learn Makaton; Mr Tumble was his role model due to his use of this communication aid. He attended St. Peter's Primary School, Benton Park School, and Shipley College. Aged eight, he joined Stage Door, a performing arts and music school in Guiseley, which he was a member of until he was 19. He also later joined Mind the Gap, a performing arts college in Bradford, and spent a few years at a drama class at Elev8 in Horsforth.

== Career ==
In 2016, he started spending his Saturday mornings volunteering at a Parkrun in Woodhouse Moor in Leeds, the Hyde Park Harriers. He later took over the course himself and became a Parkrun ambassador. While volunteering, a Sky UK TV crew who were filming nearby asked if they could film him for a day for a series they were making. They released a film about his running in 2019, which aired as part of Jessica's Parkrun Heroes, which was presented by Jessica Ennis-Hill. That year, Webster took a post at Café 21 Co in Leeds, a café launched in 2019 and staffed by people with Down syndrome. He has credited the café with giving him "a sense of independence", and stated in 2024 that he still put in shifts there when he could.

Webster in a 2021 Mencap video

Mencap saw the film and asked if he would become an ambassador, before referring him to a filmmaker who was making a short film intended to challenge perceptions about disability. He was given a lead role in S.A.M. opposite Sam Retford, playing one of two Sams. The show was broadcast online as part of the Iris Prize LGBT+ Film Festival, which ran from 6 to 11 October 2020. Will Stroude of Attitude wrote that Webster "plays Sam from the posh houses with a calm assurance and wonderful screen presence", giving "his Sam an emotional availability that Retford matches to make their romantic journey credible and heart-warming".

After being scouted by the BBC following his work with Mencap, he recorded a video for BBC Bitesize called Busting Myths, in which Webster talked about common misconceptions of Down syndrome. The clip went viral on social media, prompting CBeebies to contact him and offer him an interview, and he began presenting for the channel as a guest presenter. His first CBeebies show, broadcast 20 September 2021, saw Webster perform Saturday Night Fever-style dance moves, make a smoothie, and recite a poem. A clip of this went viral on Twitter, and within two days of broadcast it had been viewed over 1,200,000 times. Hayley Newman of the i wrote that Webster had "effervescence, bubbly charm, a quick wit", "a trendy vibe that his viewers aspire to emulate", and "an extra chromosome", while his appointment was praised by Sally Phillips, Mencap, and Cerrie Burnell. He was later hired as a full-time presenter, and won Best Presenter at the British Academy Children's Awards 2022.

Webster then appeared with Bethany Asher in Bebe A.I., a sci-fi short which aired as part of the Oska Bright Film Festival in March 2022, in which he and Asher played a couple with Down syndrome who were fighting to save an android baby they wanted to adopt. He then played a telegram boy in The Railway Children Return. In 2022, he participated in that year's Strictly Come Dancing Christmas special, where he performed a Charleston to "Good News" from Nativity! The Musical. He and his dance partner Amy Dowden practiced for three weeks beforehand, as often as they could fit into Webster's schedule. His other competitors were Nicola Roberts, Larry Lamb, Rickie Haywood-Williams, Rosie Ramsey, and Alexandra Mardell, who won the episode. He later appeared on Casualty, where he played the drug dealer Josh Milner, and World on Fire, where he played Ted. On World Book Day 2023, he published an autobiography, This Is Me, which initially stemmed from the poem he read during his first day presenting on CBeebies. He subsequently signed a deal with Scholastic for two books co-written with Helen Harvey; the first, Why Not?, was published in 2024, while George and the Mini Dragon had been published by March 2025. In January 2025, Webster, Ben Cajee, and Maddie Moate were announced as presenters for series 14 of Something Special.

== Filmography ==
George Webster's television credits with year of release, title(s) and role
Year	Title	Role	Notes
2019	Jessica's Parkrun Heroes	Himself	Episode: "George Webster"
2020	S.A.M.	"Sam from the posh houses"	
2022	Bebe A.I.	Jonny Stormer	
2022	The Railway Children Return	Telegram boy	
2022	Strictly Come Dancing	Contestant	Christmas special
2023	Casualty	Josh Milner	Episode: "Fight or Flight"
2023	World on Fire	Ted	Episode: "Wrong"
2025	Something Special	Himself	
