= Animated Tales of the World =

- Also known as: Contes animats d'arreu del món (Catalan)
- Genre: Animation; Family
- Created by: Christopher Grace
- Country of origin: United Kingdom
- Original language: English
- No. of seasons: 3
- No. of episodes: 39

Production
- Production company: Children's Television Trust International

Original release
- Network: HBO (US); Channel 4 (UK)
- Release: 11 February 2001 – 3 November 2003

Animated Tales of the World is a 2001 animated series that aired on HBO and S4C. It was produced by Children's Television Trust International and Christmas Films for S4C and Channel 4. The series is an anthology series adapting a unique story from different countries around the world, with each episode having a different art and animation style. It has the largest co-production in the history of broadcast television, involving 39 countries.

== Episodes ==
=== Season 1 (2001) ===
- 01 – Green Man of Knowledge, A Tale from Scotland – 11 February 2001
- 02 – Fionn, A Tale from Ireland – 11 February 2001
- 03 – Ewen Conger, A Tale from France – 11 March 2001
- 04 – The Two Brothers, A Tale from Russia – 11 March 2001
- 05 – Raven Steals the Daylight, A Tale from Alaska – 18 March 2001
- 06 – Tree with the Golden Apples, A Tale from Holland – 18 March 2001

=== Season 2 (2002) ===
- 01 – The Magic Paintbrush (based on The Magic Paintbrush by Hong Xuntao), A Tale from China – 5 January 2002
- 02 – Cap O'Rushes, A Tale from England – 15 January 2002
- 03 – Podna and Podni, A Tale from Pakistan – 15 January 2002
- 04 – The Three Sisters Who Fell Into the Mountain, A Tale from Norway – 16 January 2002
- 05 – Flower of Fern, A Tale from Poland – 16 January 2002
- 06 – Bad Baby Amy, A Tale from Australia – 23 January 2002
- 07 – Shepherdess and the Chimney Sweep, A Tale from Denmark – 23 January 2002
- 08 – Redhill, A Tale from Singapore – 29 January 2002
- 09 – Timoon and the Narwhal, A Tale from Canada – 31 January 2002
- 10 – The Enchanted Lion, A Tale from Germany – 31 January 2002
- 11 – King March, A Tale from Wales – 5 February 2002
- 12 – Aunt Tiger, A Tale from Taiwan – 6 February 2002
- 13 – The Myth of Persephone, A Tale from Greece – 10 February 2002
- 14 – Shepherd Boy Tumur, A Tale from Mongolia – 10 February 2002
- 15 – The Crown and Sceptre, A Tale from Arabia – 12 February 2002
- 16 – How the Tortoise Won Respect, A Tale from South Africa – 14 February 2002
- 17 – John Henry: The Steel Driving Man, A Tale from the United States of America – 18 February 2002
- 18 – King Solomon and the Bee, A Tale from Israel (Originally complied by Haim Nachman Bialik in And It Came To Pass),– 20 February 2002
- 19 – The Tyrant and the Child, A Tale from Burkina Faso – 25 November 2002
- 20 – The Chief and the Carpenter, A Tale from the Caribbean – 25 December 2002

=== Season 3 (2004) ===
- 01 – The Shoemaker's Son, A Tale from Armenia – 3 November 2003
- 02 – The Magic Gourd, A Tale from China – 3 November 2003
- 03 – Ummemo the Echo, A Tale from South Africa – 3 November 2003
- 04 – The Story of Flax, A Tale from Poland – 3 November 2003
- 05 – Merlin and the Dragons, A Tale from Wales – 3 November 2003
- 06 – The Manairons, A Tale from Catalonia – 3 November 2003
- 07 – Frau Holle, A Tale from Germany – 3 November 2003
- 08 – The Multi-Colored Jackal, A Tale from India – 3 November 2003
- 09 – Omuninyan, A Tale from Namibia – 3 November 2003
- 10 – The Loch Ness Kelpie Gaelic, A Tale from Scotland – 3 November 2003
- 11 – Crossing the Snow, A Tale from Japan – 3 November 2003
- 12 – The Raspberry Worm, A Tale from Finland – 3 November 2003
- 13 – The Boy who had No Story, A Tale from Ireland – 3 November

== Production ==
Work on the anthology started in 1998 by the S4C-led Children's Television Trust International (CTTI) for interested broadcasters, for a round of 26 episodes. By November 1998, Dublin company Moving Still Productions won the contract for the Irish episode, tentatively titled How Fionn Became Leader of the Fianna. It was expected that the anthology would air in at least 80 countries in the year 2000.

In Canada, a preview of the series aired on the TVO network to mark UNICEF's International Children's Day of Broadcasting, on 12 December 2000, with the Chinese episode The Magic Paintbrush. The series joined TVO's regular schedule in January.

In 2001, S4C International, one of the partners involved, announced a second season. Bids for episodes featuring two Welsh stories were made at the 2001 European Cartoon Forum that year.

A third season was on the cards in 2003 by S4C's soon-to-be-outgoing head of animation Chris Grace. One of the episodes, adapted from Kenji Miyazawa's Crossing the Snow, was produced by Koguma Atsuko and won four awards.

== Awards ==
It won two Primetime Emmy Awards in 2001, for Outstanding Individual Achievement in Animation and Outstanding Voice-Over Performance for Peter Macon. At the 2001 British Academy Children's Awards, the episode "Aunt Tiger" won the Animation category while the episodes "Chief and the Carpenter" and "The Tyrant and the Child" received nominations for the International category. The following year, the episode "Bad Baby Amy" was nominated for the Animation award.
