= Charlie and Lola (TV series) =

British animated children's television series

- Title card
- Created by: Lauren Child
- Based on: Charlie and Lola by Lauren Child
- Written by: Bridget Hurst; Carol Noble; Samantha Hill; Dave Ingham; Anna Starkey; Olly Smith; Laura Beaumont; Paul Larson
- Directed by: Kitty Taylor
- Creative directors: Alan Kerswell; Gary Dunn; Leigh Hodgkinson; Jonathan Hodgson; Gideon Rigal; Jim Nolan
- Voices of: Jethro Lundie-Brown (S1); Maisie Cowell (S1); Daniel Mayers (S2); Clementine Cowell (S2); Oriel Agranoff (S3); Holly Callaway (S3)
- Theme music composer: Munk & Dyson
- Composers: John Greswell; David Schweitzer (S2-3); Chris Taylor (S1); Munk & Dyson (S1)
- Country of origin: United Kingdom
- Original language: English
- No. of series: 3
- No. of episodes: 78 (+2 specials) (list of episodes)

Production
- Executive producers: Michael Carrington; Lauren Child
- Producers: Claudia Lloyd; Tom Beattie; Nikki Chaplin
- Editors: Zurine Ainz; Stephen Perkins; Claire Dodgson; Katie Bryer; Yulia Martynova; Ben Campbell
- Running time: 11 minutes; 22 minutes (specials)
- Production company: Tiger Aspect Productions

Original release
- Network: CBeebies
- Release: 7 November 2005 – 24 April 2008

Charlie and Lola is a British animated children's television series based on the Charlie and Lola children's picture book series by Lauren Child, produced by Tiger Aspect Productions for CBeebies. It ran for 3 series from 7 November 2005 to 24 April 2008, winning multiple BAFTA Children's Awards throughout its run. The animation uses a collage style that emulates the style of the original books.

== Synopsis ==
7-year-old Charlie Sonner has a little 5-year-old sister Lola; he describes her as "small and very funny". Lola often gets caught up in situations that she (inadvertently) causes, whether it's running out of money at the zoo and having to borrow Charlie's to forgetting her entire suitcase when having a sleepover at a friend's house. These situations are sometimes comedic but often reflect real world problems that younger children may face, such as losing a best friend, not getting the preferred part in a school play, or becoming too excited about an upcoming event and accidentally ruining it.

When these situations happen, Charlie usually ends up having to solve her problems through imaginative or creative methods, or by explaining to Lola where she went wrong. This is particularly demonstrated in the debut episode, "I Will Not Ever Never Eat a Tomato", where Charlie pretends that her least favourite foods (such as carrots, mashed potatoes, fish fingers and tomatoes) are more fantastical items in order to encourage her to eat them, such as 'orange twiglets from Jupiter' and 'ocean nibblers from the supermarket under the sea'. This may encourage young children to eat particular healthy foods that would otherwise come across as undesirable to them.

In many episodes, Lola's best friend Lotta, Lola's imaginary friend Soren Lorenson and Charlie's best friend Marv become involved in some way or another. Although adults are mentioned through dialogue, none of them are ever shown or heard.

== Episodes ==
Series	Episodes	Originally released	
Series	Episodes	First released	Last released
1	26	7 November 2005	12 December 2005
2	26	1 May 2006	20 April 2007
3	26	17 November 2007	24 April 2008
Seasonal specials	2	25 December 2006	3 November 2007

== Characters ==
=== Primary ===
- Charlie Sonner (voiced by Jethro Lundie-Brown in Series 1, Daniel Mayers in Series 2, and Oriel Agranoff in Series 3) is the imaginative and helpful 7-year-old brother of Lola. He has platinum blond hair like Lola. Charlie is often asked to look after Lola, and he sometimes has to think of creative ways to keep her busy. He often breaks the fourth wall by talking about Lola to the viewers.
- Lola Sonner (voiced by Maisie Cowell in Series 1, Clementine Cowell in Series 2, and Holly Callaway in Series 3) is an imaginative and quirky 5-year-old girl. Lola is the younger sister of Charlie and is best friends with Lotta. She is described by her brother Charlie as "small and very funny". She normally wears blue butterfly hairpins and has short blonde hair. She likes playing, is often a drama queen, and has an imaginary friend named Soren Lorenson.
- Marv Lowe (voiced by Ryan Harris) is Charlie's best friend. He has a younger brother named Morten and an older brother named Marty. Marv has a dachshund named Sizzles and a pet mouse named Squeak.
- Lotta Pamavani (voiced by Morgan Gayle) is Lola's best friend, who is African-British and has black curly hair. After meeting at school, they became friends quickly and spend a lot of time together. Lotta usually follows Lola's lead, and is in awe of Charlie, Marv, and Sizzles.
- Soren Lorenson (voiced by Stanley Street) is Lola's imaginary friend, rendered as monochrome and translucent. When Lola and Soren are playing, he is rather detailed (has the look of a real person, only grey and translucent). When someone interrupts them (such as Charlie), he loses detail until the person who interrupted them leaves.

=== Minor ===
- Minnie Reader (voiced by Katie Hedges) is a girl in Lola and Lotta's class. She wears glasses and likes guinea pigs and ponies. Minnie is often seen with Evie.
- Morten Lowe (voiced by Macauley Keeper) is Marv's younger brother and a friend of Lola's. He is quite shy but once he starts to play, he's a lot of fun.
- Arnold Wolf (voiced by Eoin O'Sulivan) is Lola's neighbour. He is featured in several episodes. In "I Am Extremely Absolutely Boiling", Arnold accidentally drops Lola's ice cream, causing Lola to have a falling-out with him. However, he makes it up to her by letting her use his paddling pool.
- Evie (voiced by Lara Mayers) is a girl in Lola and Lotta's class. She has red hair which she wears in pigtails. She also wears a skirt, a long-sleeved shirt and striped tights.
- Mum and Dad are Charlie and Lola's parents. Like all other adult characters, they are referred to but never seen.
- Granny and Grandpa are Charlie and Lola's grandparents. Granny paints for a hobby, while it appears that Grandpa is good with horses. Like all other adult characters, they are referred to but are never seen.

== Animation style ==
The television series uses a collage style of animation which captures the style of the original books. 2D Flash animation, paper cutout, fabric design, real textures, photomontage, and archive footage are all employed and subsequently animated in the software applications Adobe Flash, ToonBoom, Adobe After Effects, and CelAction2D.

The series is also notable for its use of children rather than adult voice actors as well as not showing adults, both techniques pioneered by the Peanuts television specials.

== Broadcast ==
In the United States, the series aired on Playhouse Disney (now Disney Jr.).

== Release ==
On 14 December 2004, Tiger Aspect Productions signed a licensing and distribution deal with BBC Worldwide (later BBC Studios) for the series.

On 12 October 2023, Banijay Kids & Family acquired the distribution rights to the series from BBC Studios.

== Awards and nominations ==
Year	Association	Category	Recipient (if any)	Result
2006	Cartoons on the Bay	Best Series For Infants		Won
2006	Cartoons on the Bay	Best Programme		Won
2006	Cartoons on the Bay	The Raisat YOYO Best Series		Won
2006	BAFTA Children's Awards	Best Pre-school Animation Series		Nominated
2006	Bradford Animation Festival	Best TV Series for Children and Adults		Won
2006	Royal Television Society Programme Awards	Best Children's Programme (for "Welcome to Lolaland")		Nominated
2007	BAFTA Children's Awards	Best Pre-school Animation Series		Won
2007	BAFTA Children's Awards	Best Writer	Bridget Hurst	Won
2007	BAFTA Children's Awards	Best Writer	Anna Starkey	Nominated
2007	BAFTA Children's Awards	Best Animation (for "How Many More Minutes Until Christmas?")		Nominated
2007	Royal Television Society Craft & Design Awards	Best Music Original Score	John Greswell and David Schweitzer	Won
2007	Annecy International Animation Film Festival	Special Award for a TV Series (for "I Will Be Especially, Very Careful")		Won
2007	Broadcast Awards	Best Children's Programme		Won
2007	Annie Awards	Best Animated Television Production		Nominated
2008	BAFTA Children's Awards	Best Animation (for "Everything is Different and Not the Same")		Won
2008	BAFTA Children's Awards	Best Pre-school Animation Series		Won
2008	BAFTA Children's Awards	Best Writer	Dave Ingham	Nominated
