= JoJo & Gran Gran =

British children's animated television series

- Based on: Characters from Jo-Jo and Gran-Gran, All in a Week by Laura Henry-Allain
- Directed by: Tim Ruffle (Series 1); Ben Halliwell (Series 2 and 3)
- Voices of: Taiya Samuel; Cathy Tyson; Ashley Joseph; Teresa Gallagher; Llewella Gideon
- Opening theme: Performed by Sharlene Hector
- Composers: Ellie Wyatt; Joss Peach; Jamie Salisbury
- Country of origin: United Kingdom
- Original language: English
- No. of series: 3
- No. of episodes: 130

Production
- Executive producers: Vanessa Amberleigh; Tony Reed; Ros Attille
- Producer: Tom Cousins
- Running time: 11 minutes
- Production companies: BBC Studios Kids & Family; A Productions

Original release
- Network: CBeebies
- Release: 16 March 2020 – present

JoJo & Gran Gran is a British children's animated television series produced by BBC Studios Kids & Family Productions for CBeebies. Inspired by the characters in Laura Henry-Allain's semi-autobiographical picture book Jo-Jo and Gran-Gran, All in a Week, the series was developed for television by Ros Attille and produced by Tom Cousins.

Every episode follows the adventures of four year old JoJo and her Saint Lucian-born grandmother Gran Gran through a mixture of animation and live action segments that encourage pre-school viewers to recreate the activities featured in each episode. JoJo & Gran Gran was the first British animated series to centre a Black British family and has received several industry awards, including the 2021 Broadcast Award for Best Pre-School Programme and the 2022 Kidscreen Award for Best Mixed-Media Series. It premiered in the United Kingdom on 16 March 2020 and continues to air on CBeebies. In the United States, it was released on the Noggin streaming app 14 June 2021. The series moved to Tubi after the closure of the Noggin app.

== Premise ==
JoJo is an inquisitive and cheerful four-and-a-half-year-old girl who lives in London. Her loving Gran Gran looks after her while her parents work and teaches her about the many wonders of life and the world, such as cookery, friendship and her Saint Lucian heritage.

The series also features live-action interviews with real children, which accompany the animated segments, and features the children discussing the topic of the episode and how it relates to their lives and families. Normally, this will then lead to them performing a related activity, such as cooking a particular dish or painting.

== Voice cast ==
- Taiya Samuel as JoJo
- Cathy Tyson as Gran Gran
- Llewella Gideon as Great Gran Gran
- Ashley Joseph as Jared
- Teresa Gallagher as Cynthia

== Production ==
Development of the series began after BBC producer Ros Attille discovered Laura Henry-Allain's semi-autobiographical picture book 'Jo-Jo and Gran-Gran, All in a Week'. Seeing potential in the characters, Attille developed a television adaptation centred on the concept of time, in which Gran Gran would help JoJo understand ideas such as the days of the week, months and the passing of time. The project spent approximately two years in development before being commissioned by the BBC under the working title It's About Time.

Following the commission, series producer Tom Cousins joined the project to build on the television concept developed by Attille. Working closely with Henry-Allain and the production team, he placed greater emphasis on the relationship between JoJo and Gran Gran, everyday family experiences and learning through play, while using the changing seasons as the principal means of exploring the passage of time. The production team further developed the series by introducing supporting characters including Jared, Cynthia and Great-Gran Gran, alongside the recurring catchphrase "I've Got a Gran Gran Plan". Stories increasingly focused on activities familiar to preschool audiences, such as visits to the park, craft activities and family outings, with the live-action segments encouraging children to recreate many of the activities at home.

The series was produced as a mixed-media production by BBC Children's In-House Productions, which later became BBC Studios Kids & Family Productions. Scripting, casting, voice recording, live-action filming, music production and post-production were undertaken by the BBC production team, while animation was provided by A Productions.

Tom Cousins served as series producer and Laura Henry-Allain as associate producer. Vanessa Amberleigh and Tony Reed served as executive producers for the first series, while Attille returned as co-executive producer alongside Reed for the second and third series.

In the US, the series was released on the Noggin streaming app on 14 June 2021. It is currently available on Tubi.

The High Commission of Saint Lucia and the Saint Lucia tourism authority were consulted for the series.

== Reception ==
=== Critical reception ===
JoJo & Gran Gran received positive critical attention for its relatable depiction of family life, focus on learning through play and the bond between grandparents and grandchildren. Critics also highlighted the series' authentic representation of Black British family life and Saint Lucian heritage. Writing in The Guardian, Grace Holliday cited the programme as part of a wider shift towards greater diversity in British children's television. She highlighted its depiction of an active Black British grandmother and its rejection of stereotypical portrayals of grandparents.

Awarding the series the 2021 Broadcast Award for Best Pre-School Programme, the judging panel praised its relatable storytelling, family relationships and successful integration of live-action sequences with animation. One judge described the series as one that "brilliantly connects to children through relatable storylines and relationships", while another praised the way the live-action inserts complemented the animated stories.

=== Audience Response ===
Following its launch in March 2020, JoJo & Gran Gran became one of CBeebies' most successful new preschool series. In November 2020, the BBC announced that the series had received more than 14 million requests on BBC iPlayer. The broadcaster subsequently commissioned a further 88 episodes across a second and third series, together with a Saint Lucia 22 minute special, a BBC Sounds audio series and two games for the CBeebies apps.

== Awards and nominations ==
Year	Award	Category	Nominee(s)	Result	Ref.
2021	Royal Television Society Programme Awards	Children's Programme	"It's Time to Go to the Hairdresser's"	Nominated	
2021	Broadcast Awards	Best Pre-School Programme	JoJo & Gran Gran	Won	
2021	Rockie Awards	Animation Preschool (0–4)	JoJo & Gran Gran	Nominated	
2022	British Academy Children's Awards 2022	Performer	Cathy Tyson	Nominated	
2022	British Academy Children's Awards 2022	Young Performer	Taiya Samuel	Won	
2022	Kidscreen Awards	Best Mixed-Media Series	JoJo & Gran Gran	Won	
2023	Kidscreen Awards	Best Mixed-Media Series	JoJo & Gran Gran	Nominated	
2023	Royal Television Society North West Awards	Best Pre-School Children's Programme	JoJo & Gran Gran	Won	

== Episodes ==
=== Series One ===
==== Spring ====
No.	Title	Written by	Original release date
1	"It's Time to Post a Picture"	Karen Reed	16 March 2020
2	"It's Time to Catch the Bus"	Sharon Miller	17 March 2020
3	"It's Time to Check the Weather Forecast"	Mark Huckerby & Nick Ostler	18 March 2020
4	"It's Time for a Spring Clear Out"	Ian Carney	19 March 2020
5	"It's Time to Find a Butterfly"	Ian Carney	20 March 2020
6	"It's Time to Bake"	Omari McCarthy	23 March 2020
7	"It's Time to Visit the Farm"	Karen Reed	24 March 2020
8	"It's Time to Make Up a Story"	Gerard Foster	25 March 2020
9	"It's Time to Grow a Flower"	Trish Cooke	26 March 2020
10	"It's Time to Look at Old Picture"	Seyi Odusanya	27 March 2020
11	"It's Time to Dance"	Kerri Grant	30 March 2020

==== Summer ====
No.	Title	Written by	Original release date
12	"It's Time for Carnival"	Lucia Haynes	20 July 2020
13	"It's Time to Find a Dinosaur"	Gerard Foster	21 July 2020
14	"It's Time to Visit the Library"	Gerard Foster	22 July 2020
15	"It's Time for a Race"	Becky Overton	23 July 2020
16	"It's Time to Build a Sandcastle"	Nathan Caton	24 July 2020
17	"It's Time to Go to the Hairdresser's"	Nathan Caton	27 July 2020
18	"It's Time to Put on a Show"	Omari McCarthy	28 July 2020
19	"It's Time for a Sleepover"	Becky Overton	29 July 2020
20	"It's Time to Go on Holiday"	Liam Swann	30 July 2020
21	"It's Time to Pick Strawberries"	Ian Carney	31 July 2020
22	"It's Time to Ride a Bike"	Ian Carney	3 August 2020

==== Autumn ====
No.	Title	Written by	Original release date
23	"It's Time for Autumn Leaves"	Lizzie Ennever	19 October 2020
24	"It's Time to Make a Film"	Seyi Odusanya	19 October 2020
25	"It's Time to Build a Den"	Karen Reed	19 October 2020
26	"It's Time to Play Football"	Liam Swann	19 October 2020
27	"It's Time to See the Moon"	Jess Parker	19 October 2020
28	"It's Time to Make Music"	Ian Carney	26 October 2020
29	"It's Time to Harvest Vegetables"	Nathan Caton	26 October 2020
30	"It's Time to Visit the Dentist"	Lucia Haynes	26 October 2020
31	"It's Time for a Birthday Party"	Nathan Caton	26 October 2020
32	"It's Time for a Treasure Hunt"	Karen Reed	30 October 2020
33	"It's Time for Halloween"	Jess Parker	30 October 2020
34	"It's Time for Christmas"	Lucia Haynes	5 December 2020

==== Winter ====
No.	Title	Written by	Original release date
35	"It's Time to Ice-Skate"	Lizzie Ennever	25 January 2021
36	"It's Time to Paint"	Jess Parker	25 January 2021
37	"It's Time to Build a Snowman"	Laura Henry-Allain	25 January 2021
38	"It's Time to Make a Rocket"	Rose Johnson & Camille Ucan	25 January 2021
39	"It's Time for Night-time Workers"	Stephen Hyams	25 January 2021
40	"It's Time to Stop the Birds"	Jess Parker	1 February 2021
41	"It's Time to Look After Monty"	Charlotte Bushell	1 February 2021
42	"It's Time for a Jumble Sale"	Liam Swann	1 February 2021
43	"It's Time to Catch a Train"	Hannah Smith	1 February 2021
44	"It's Time for a Special Visitor"	Rose Johnson & Camille Ucan	1 February 2021

=== Series Two ===
==== Spring ====
No.	Title	Written by	Original release date
45	"It's Time to See a Rainbow"	Seyi Odusanya	14 March 2022
46	"It's Time to Visit the Art Gallery"	Jess Parker	15 March 2022
47	"It's Time to Press a Flower"	Rose Johnson & Camille Ucan	16 March 2022
48	"It's Time to Discover Somewhere New"	Jess Parker	17 March 2022
49	"It's Time to Build a Bug Hotel"	Rose Johnson & Camille Ucan	18 March 2022
50	"It's Time to Visit the Market"	Ashley Joseph	21 March 2022
51	"It's Time to Open a Café"	Seyi Odusanya	22 March 2022
52	"It's Time to Fly a Kite"	Leroy Brito	23 March 2022
53	"It's Time to Play Hospitals"	Story by : Liam Swann; Teleplay by : Hannah Smith	24 March 2022
54	"It's Time to Run a Marathon"	Rose Johnson & Camille Ucan	25 March 2022

==== Summer ====
No.	Title	Written by	Original release date
55	"It's Time to Go Swimming"	Ashley Joseph	20 June 2022
56	"It's Time for a Family Barbecue"	Ashley Joseph	21 June 2022
57	"It's Time for a Boat Ride"	Gemma Bedeau	22 June 2022
58	"It's Time to Play Basketball"	Nathan Caton	23 June 2022
59	"It's Time to Go Pond Dipping"	Lizzie Ennever	24 June 2022
60	"It's Time to Meet a New Baby"	Jess Parker	27 June 2022
61	"It's Time to Visit a Maze"	Angela Clarke	28 June 2022
62	"It's Time for an Indoor Picnic"	Katrina Smith-Jackson	29 June 2022
63	"It's Time to Search for Seashells"	Jess Parker	30 June 2022
64	"It's Time to Make Ice Lollies"	Jess Parker	1 July 2022

==== Autumn ====
No.	Title	Written by	Original release date
65	"It's Time to Go on a Voyage"	Katrina Smith-Jackson	1 October 2022
66	"It's Time to Celebrate Diwali"	Alison Ray	24 October 2022
67	"It's Time to Visit the Aquarium"	Alison Ray	25 October 2022
68	"It's Time for a Woodland Walk"	Mariama Ives-Moiba	26 October 2022
69	"It's Time to See the Planets"	Ashley Joseph	27 October 2022
70	"It's Time to Make a Volcano"	Alison Ray	28 October 2022
71	"It's Time to Bury a Time Capsule"	Seyi Odusanya	31 October 2022
72	"It's Time to Go Beach Combing"	Angela Clarke	1 November 2022
73	"It's Time to Celebrate Creole Day"	Gemma Bedeau	2 November 2022
74	"It's Time to Look for Night-time Animals"	Kate Hinkman	3 November 2022
75	"It's Time to Go to Work"	Alison Ray	4 November 2022

==== Winter ====
No.	Title	Written by	Original release date
76	"It's Time to Play in the Snow"	Alison Ray	16 January 2023
77	"It's Time for Pottery"	Seyi Odusanya	17 January 2023
78	"It's Time to Help at the Farm"	Lizzie Ennever	18 January 2023
79	"It's Time to Remember Grandad"	Gemma Bedeau	19 January 2023
80	"It's Time for a Community Newsletter"	Nathan Caton	20 January 2023
81	"It's Time to Build a Scarecrow"	Mariama Ives-Moiba	23 January 2023
82	"It's Time for a Tea Party"	Athena Kugblenu	24 January 2023
83	"It's Time for Poetry"	Athena Kugblenu	25 January 2023
84	"It's Time to Find Monty's Ball"	Alison Ray	26 January 2023
85	"It's Time to Make a Sorrel Drink"	Nathan Caton	27 January 2023
86	"It's Time to Go to the Airport"	Mariama Ives-Moiba	11 February 2023

=== Specials ===
No.	Title	Written by	Original release date
87	"It's Time to Visit Saint Lucia"	Ashley Joseph & Gemma Weekes	12 February 2023

=== Series Three ===
==== Spring ====
No.	Title	Written by	Original release date
88	"It's Time for Mother's Day"	Gemma Weekes	19 March 2023
89	"It's Time for a Community Jam"	Alison Ray	20 March 2023
90	"It's Time to Make a Journey Stick"	Jess Parker	21 March 2023
91	"It's Time to Invent"	Jess Parker	23 March 2023
92	"It's Time to Visit the Optician"	Alison Ray	27 March 2023
93	"It's Time to Dress Up"	Rose Johnson & Camille Ucan	28 March 2023
94	"It's Time to Open a Shop"	Ashley Joseph	28 March 2023
95	"It's Time to Build a Nest"	Mariama Ives-Moiba	29 March 2023
96	"It's Time for Some Science"	Gemma Weekes	30 March 2023
97	"It's Time to Look for Frogs"	Jess Parker	31 March 2023
98	"It's Time for an Easter Feast"	Ashley Joseph	7 April 2023

==== Summer ====
No.	Title	Written by	Original release date
99	"It's Time to Visit a Castle"	Rose Johnson & Camille Ucan	31 July 2023
100	"It's Time to Swim Underwater"	Mariama Ives-Moiba	1 August 2023
101	"It's Time to Find Street Art"	Gemma Weekes	2 August 2023
102	"It's Time to Go Camping"	Mariama Ives-Moiba	3 August 2023
103	"It's Time to Go Litter Picking"	Dare Aiyegbayo	4 August 2023
104	"It's Time to Be a Superhero"	Ashley Joseph	7 August 2023
105	"It's Time to Play Beach Cricket"	Alison Ray	8 August 2023
106	"It's Time to Make Jewellery"	Atlanta Green	9 August 2023
107	"It's Time to Explore the Park"	Gemma Bedeau	10 August 2023

==== Autumn ====
No.	Title	Written by	Original release date
108	"It's Time for a Harvest Festival"	Mariama Ives-Moiba	1 October 2023
109	"It's Time to Make a Family Tree"	Rose Johnson & Camille Ucan	2 October 2023
110	"It's Time for a Surprise"	Dare Aiyegbayo	3 October 2023
112	"It's Time to Play Schools"	Gemma Weekes	4 October 2023
113	"It's Time to Look for Signs"	Atlanta Green	5 October 2023
114	"It's Time to Hear an Orchestra"	Alison Ray	6 October 2023
115	"It's Time to Look for Clues"	Mina Barber	9 October 2023
116	"It's Time to Write a Book"	Mariama Ives-Moiba	10 October 2023
117	"It's Time to Be Nature Detectives"	Rose Johnson & Camille Ucan	11 October 2023
118	"It's Time to Go Stargazing"	Alison Ray	12 October 2023
119	"It's Time to Eat Green Banana and Saltfish"	Gemma Weekes	11 August 2023

==== Winter ====
No.	Title	Written by	Original release date
120	"It's Time for a Roller Disco"	Alison Ray	29 January 2024
121	"It's Time to Make a New Game"	Ashley Joseph	30 January 2024
122	"It's Time for Monty's Haircut"	Mina Barber	31 January 2024
123	"It's Time to Mix Colours"	Atlanta Green	1 February 2024
124	"It's Time for a Folk Tale"	Gemma Bedeau	2 February 2024
125	"It's Time to Braid Hair"	Jasmine Richards	5 February 2024
126	"It's Time for a Dance Class"	Rose Johnson & Camille Ucan	6 February 2024
127	"It's Time to Make Shadow Puppets"	Delia-Rene Donaldson	7 February 2024
128	"It's Time to Watch a Family Film"	Alison Ray	8 February 2024
129	"It's Time to Bake Gingerbread Pandas"	Mariama Ives-Moiba	9 February 2024
130	"It's Time for Lunar New Year"	Gemma Weekes	10 February 2024
