= List of Charlie and Lola episodes =

Charlie and Lola is a British animated children's television series based on the popular children's picture book series of the same name by Lauren Child. It aired from 7 November 2005 to 24 April 2008. The animation uses a collage style that emulates the style of the original books.

== Series overview ==
Series	Episodes	Originally released	
Series	Episodes	First released	Last released
1	26	7 November 2005	12 December 2005
2	26	1 May 2006	20 April 2007
3	26	17 November 2007	24 April 2008
Seasonal specials	2	25 December 2006	3 November 2007

== Episodes ==
=== Season 1 (2005) ===
No. overall	No. in series	Title	Directed by	Written by	Storyboarded by	Original release date
1	1	"I Will Not Ever Never Eat a Tomato"	Kitty Taylor	Bridget Hurst and Carol Noble	Chris Drew	7 November 2005
In the pilot episode, Charlie has to make dinner for Lola, but she's a very fussy eater and refuses to eat carrots, peas, mashed potatoes, fish fingers and her least favourite food, tomatoes (although she has never tried these foods before). So Charlie tricks Lola into eating the foods she "hates" by changing their names: Carrots to "Orange Twiglets from Outer Space", Peas to "Green Drops from Green Land", Mashed Potatoes to "Cloud Fluff", and Fish Fingers to "Ocean Nibbles from under the sea".
2	2	"I Can Do Anything That's Everything All on My Own"	Kitty Taylor	Bridget Hurst and Carol Noble	Eleanor James	8 November 2005
Lola insists on doing everything on her own, even some things she is not really good at, so Charlie tries to teach her that there is nothing wrong with occasionally accepting a little help from others.
3	3	"I Am Not Sleepy and I Will Not Go to Bed"	Kitty Taylor	Samantha Hill	Trevor Ricketts	9 November 2005
Charlie is desperate to get Lola ready for bed, but Lola insists that she is not tired, and is too busy drinking her favourite strawberry pink milk with tigers, brushing her teeth with a lion, playing with a whale in the bath, and dancing with some disco dogs.
4	4	"But That is My Book"	Kitty Taylor	Bridget Hurst and Carol Noble	Simon Williams	10 November 2005
Lola's favourite book is 'Beetles, Bugs and Butterflies', which she often borrows from the local library. But when someone else borrows her beloved book, Lola is upset, so it's up to Charlie and he tries to find another book that will win her interest: 'Cheetahs and Chimpanzees'.
5	5	"There is Only One Sun and That is Me!"	Kitty Taylor	Bridget Hurst and Carol Noble	Kevin Molloy	11 November 2005
Lola has her heart set on playing the Sun in an upcoming school production, so she tries to get her teacher to fulfill her destiny, but then she is let down when becoming cast as a leaf. Charlie tries to convince Lola that leaves are very important.
6	6	"We Do Promise Honestly We Can Look After Your Dog"	Kitty Taylor	Bridget Hurst and Carol Noble	Barry Baker	14 November 2005
Lola likes dogs, but can't have one because her parents insist that she must be responsible enough to have one. Her and Lotta's favourite dog is Marv's wiener dog, Sizzles. At the park, the girls persuade Marv to leave Sizzles under their care while he and Charlie go play football. However, when they finally get their wish, Lola and Lotta detach Sizzles from his leash (despite Marv telling them never to do so) while fighting over who's in charge, and he goes missing by accident. When the girls finally find the dog, they also see one that looks just like him, and can't tell them apart. They chose the one that sits first (Sizzles' best trick) but aren't satisfied with their pick. Fortunately, Charlie reads the dog's name tag, confirming that he is Sizzles.
7	7	"I've Won, No I've Won, No I've Won"	Kitty Taylor	Dave Ingham	Chris Drew	15 November 2005
Lola always wants to win at everything – even if it means cheating. So Charlie challenges her to a race around a nearby park that she cannot possibly cheat at.
8	8	"I Like My Hair Completely the Way It Is"	Kitty Taylor	Samantha Hill	Kevin Molloy	16 November 2005
Charlie and Lola are scheduled appointments for their haircuts today, but Lola wants her hairdo just the way as it is.
9	9	"I'm Really Ever So Not Well"	Kitty Taylor	Dave Ingham	Simon Williams	17 November 2005
Lola is sick in bed and unfortunately can't play football with Charlie and Marv. Charlie has promised Marv that he'll play football with him, but Lola begs him to stay and cheer her up.
10	10	"I Am Hurrying I'm Almost Nearly Ready!"	Kitty Taylor	Samantha Hill	Jacques Gauthier	18 November 2005
Charlie is struggling to get Lola to hurry up or else they'll be late for school! Suddenly, Lola finds it very hard to hurry when there is coloring, dancing clouds, playing hopscotch on musical pavements, and laughing with hysterical hedgehogs that distract her. Guest Stars: Enn Reitel and Dan Chambers as the laughing Hedgehogs
11	11	"Boo! Made You Jump!"	Kitty Taylor	Dave Ingham	Trevor Ricketts	21 November 2005
Charlie is good at making Lola jump scared. Lola is desperate to be able to make him jump back, but, as hard as she tries, just can't seem to do it. So the only way to make him jump is to host a sleepover along with Lotta and Marv.
12	12	"The Most Wonderfullest Picnic in the Whole Wide World"	Kitty Taylor	Carol Noble	Kevin Molloy	22 November 2005
Charlie and Lola are planning a picnic along with Marv and Lotta, but the picnic is foiled when the weather exceeds the children's expectations.
13	13	"It Wasn't Me!"	Kitty Taylor	Carol Noble	Barry Baker	23 November 2005
Charlie tells Lola not to play with his home-made model rocket, but Lola just can't resist when she and her imaginary friend, Soren Lorenson, have to use it to return a sad elephant back home to the jungle. The rocket is broken in pieces, and when Charlie finds out, Lola needs help admitting that she broke his rocket.
14	14	"It's a Secret..."	Kitty Taylor	Dave Ingham	Trevor Ricketts	24 November 2005
It's Charlie's birthday, and Lola knows what his birthday surprise is. Will she be able to stop herself blurting it out and ruining it?
15	15	"I Love Going to Granny and Grandpa's, It's Just That..."	Kitty Taylor	Bridget Hurst	Kevin Molloy	25 November 2005
Charlie and Lola are going to visit their grandparents' house by the sea for the weekend. Lola likes going to Granny and Grandpa's, but she is worried about remembering to pack everything. Then she is worried about missing her parents, and they miss her too.
16	16	"I Do Not Ever, Never Want My Wobbly Tooth to Fall Out"	Kitty Taylor	Samantha Hill	Chris Drew	28 November 2005
Lola has a loose tooth, Charlie but does not want it to fall out, Marv until she learns about the tooth fairy, before the doorbell comes with Lotta, who will leave her money in exchange for her tooth. But then the tooth refuses to come out; when it finally does, Lola stores the tooth for the tooth fairy, but soon, she loses the tooth for real. Eventually, she and Charlie team up to find it.
17	17	"Say "Cheese""	Kitty Taylor	Samantha Hill	Trevor Ricketts	29 November 2005
Today is picture day at Charlie and Lola's school and Lola must keep clean for a whole day for her first portrait. But keeping clean for a whole day is really, really hard!
18	18	"I'm Just Not Keen on Spiders"	Kitty Taylor	Dave Ingham	Jacques Gauthier	30 November 2005
Lola finds a spider in the sink when trying to brush her teeth, and she doesn't like spiders very much. Charlie tries to show her that some spiders don't hurt us and that they're our friends. Soon, Lola has grown attached to the little creepy crawly, now keeping him as a pet and naming him Sidney. After they have place the spider outside, the weather changes, and Lola worries on what might happen to her new little friend.
19	19	"Snow is My Favourite and My Best"	Kitty Taylor	Samantha Hill	Trevor Ricketts	1 December 2005
Snow is forecasted and Lola can't wait for it to arrive. When it finally comes, Charlie, Lola, Marv, Lotta and Sizzles all have a wonderful time playing in it. But when the snow melts, Lola is quite down in the dumps, and Charlie must try and explain that it would lose its appeal if it snowed all the time.
20	20	"You Won't Like This Present as Much as I Do!"	Kitty Taylor	Carol Noble	Chris Drew	2 December 2005
Lola wants to choose the best present in the world for Lotta's birthday party. She chooses a doctor's kit, but doesn't think that Lotta will appreciate the kit as much as she would, and would rather like to keep it for herself.
21	21	"I Must Take Completely Everything"	Kitty Taylor	Bridget Hurst	Kevin Molloy	5 December 2005
Lola is having a sleepover at Lotta's house for the night, and packs everything she needs for them to play Cinderella. Back home, Charlie and Marv set up their race car track. But Lola arrives without her suitcase and Charlie and Marv can't find an important piece of the track, teaching both parties a lesson in improvisation and imagination.
22	22	"I Want to Play Music Too"	Kitty Taylor	Dave Ingham	Trevor Ricketts	6 December 2005
Charlie and Marv are to appear in a musical assembly about outer space at school. Lola wants to join in and desperately wishes that she could play music too, but can't seem to master any instruments. Charlie comes up with some makeshift instruments that she might be able to manage. But on the day of the presentation, Marv falls ill. It's up to Lola to demonstrate her makeshift abilities in front of everyone.
23	23	"I'm Far Too Extremely Busy"	Kitty Taylor	Samantha Hill	Chris Drew	7 December 2005
Lola is playing secretary, waitress, dentist and librarian. Way too busy to play with Lotta, Charlie, or Soren Lorenson. But Charlie's new card game, Flip-Flop, is awfully tempting.
24	24	"I Want to Be Much More Bigger Like You"	Kitty Taylor	Carol Noble	Kevin Molloy	8 December 2005
Lola wishes she was taller. Charlie tries to show her that being small can have its benefits by switching places with her.
25	25	"My Little Town"	Kitty Taylor	Dave Ingham	Trevor Ricketts	9 December 2005
Charlie and Lola have fun playing with their new "Build Your Own City" playset that Granny and Grandpa have bought them, but Charlie wants to build airports and play aliens, whereas Lola wants draw and build a zoo. Will they manage to share?
26	26	"But I Am an Alligator"	Kitty Taylor	Bridget Hurst	Chris Drew	12 December 2005
Granny and Grandpa have bought Lola an alligator costume. Lola is addicted to wearing it and insists that she will never take it off. But with an upcoming school presentation, Charlie is worried that Lola will make a fool of herself.

=== Season 2 (2006–2007) ===
No. overall	No. in season	Title	Directed by	Written by	Storyboarded by	Original release date
27	1	"It is Absolutely Completely Not Messy"	Kitty Taylor	Bridget Hurst	Trevor Ricketts	1 May 2006
Charlie and Lola's parents tell them to clean their room. Charlie is willing but has a very hard time getting Lola to cooperate and when she refuses, Charlie moves from the room.
28	2	"I Spy with My Little Eyes"	Kitty Taylor	Samantha Hill	Chris Drew	1 May 2006
Lola likes spying and observing things and then drawing them. But in doing so, she and Soren Lorenson become convinced that a pack of wolves has moved in next door.
29	3	"I Am Extremely Magic"	Kitty Taylor	Anna Starkey	Trevor Ricketts	6 May 2006
Charlie has a new magic kit and dazzles Lola and their friends with his tricks. Lola thinks that if Charlie is a magician, that must mean that she is a magician too, so Lola tries a few tricks, but becomes frustrated when she can't seem to do any magic tricks.
30	4	"How Many More Minutes?"	Kitty Taylor	Samantha Hill	Trevor Ricketts	6 May 2006
Charlie and Lola have to amuse themselves when they have to wait for their mother to have her appointment in the dentist's waiting room. They pretend to team up with the Tooth Fairy to defeat Pirate Squidbones and his "motley crew" and save two children named the Smiley Children.
31	5	"This is Actually My Party"	Kitty Taylor	Dave Ingham	Michelle Dabbs	22 May 2006
Today is Charlie's birthday, and he is planning a monster-themed birthday party. But Lola hates this theme and starts changing everything, and she starts doing things (such as opening his cards) for him. This annoys him greatly, but she decides to help improve where the doorbell rings Charlie’s friends to the party.
32	6	"I Am Collecting a Collection"	Kitty Taylor	Dave Ingham	Michelle Dabbs	22 May 2006
Charlie is collecting a set of toy dinosaur figures from cereal boxes, and Lola decides that she'd like to collect something too, but doesn't know what.
33	7	"Lucky, Lucky Me"	Kitty Taylor	Bridget Hurst	Chris Drew	19 June 2006
Lola feels extremely lucky. But when she and Charlie set out to go to the cinema to see a movie called 'Bat Cat' (a parody of Batman), a series of events convinces Lola that her luck has run out, and that she may never be lucky again.
34	8	"I Just Love My Red Shiny Shoes"	Kitty Taylor	Anna Starkey	David Stoten	19 June 2006
Lola's favourite red shiny shoes are too small for her. Charlie takes her to buy a new pair, but Lola wants to keep the pair that she has.
35	9	"My Best Best Bestest Friend"	Kitty Taylor	Carol Noble	David Stoten	3 July 2006
Lola and Lotta are best friends. But when Lotta is asked to watch over Evie, a new girl at school, Lotta apparently starts to lose interest in Lola, and Lola is worried that she has lost her beloved friend forever.
36	10	"I Really Wonder What Plant I'm Growing"	Kitty Taylor	Olly Smith	Trevor Ricketts	3 July 2006
Lola is impressed by the tomato plant that Charlie is growing (even though she hates tomatoes). She decides to grow a plant of her own and gets a seed, but doesn't know what it will grow.
37	11	"Charlie is Broken!"	Kitty Taylor	Bridget Hurst	Michelle Dabbs	28 August 2006
Charlie and Lola are creating a circus for their grandparents, with Charlie juggling and Lola desperately trying to do forward rolls. But when he is playing football in the park with Marv, Charlie breaks his arm. This leaves the siblings afraid that they may have to cancel the show.
38	12	"I Will Be Especially, Very Careful"	Kitty Taylor	Anna Starkey	Trevor Ricketts	28 August 2006
Lola likes Lotta's brand new white fluffy coat. She swaps the coat for a handbag that her mom handed her, promising to keep it clean and intact and return it at school the next day. Lola discovers that this is easier said than done.
39	13	"Yes I Am, No You're Not"	Kitty Taylor	Carol Noble	Inna Korelskaia	4 September 2006
Charlie and Lola are looking forward to a Chinese puppet show, but first they must deal with their own squabbling or they cannot go.
40	14	"I Am Really, Really, Really Concentrating"	Kitty Taylor	Samantha Hill	Trevor Ricketts	4 September 2006
Sports day is coming up. Charlie and Marv are going to do the three-legged race, Lotta is going to enter the obstacle course, and Lola is very determined to enter the egg and spoon race.
41	15	"Please May I Have Some of Yours?"	Kitty Taylor	Olly Smith	Michelle Dabbs	9 October 2006
Granny and Grandpa are taking Charlie and Lola to the zoo. But Lola eats all of her sandwiches before lunch, wastes all her bread to feed to the ducks, uses up all of her camera film, and spends all of her money – when she is set on buying a toy seal for the bath. Charlie reluctantly helps her out, but wants her to learn to save things.
42	16	"Can You Maybe Turn the Light On?"	Kitty Taylor	Samantha Hill	David Stoten	9 October 2006
After Charlie reads her a story about an ogre, Lola becomes scared of the dark. But all of the things that make her feel safe keep Charlie awake.
43	17	"What If I Get Lost in the Middle of Nowhere?"	Kitty Taylor	Dave Ingham	David Stoten	10 November 2006
Lola has a fear of getting lost. She is not looking forward to the school field to a maze trip and would rather stay behind. Charlie teaches her some methods that should stop her getting lost and help her if she does.
44	18	"Welcome to Lolaland"	Kitty Taylor	Olly Smith	Chris Drew	10 November 2006
Charlie and Marv are learning Spanish. Lola would like to learn a foreign language too, but can't grasp it. With Soren Lorenson, she decides to make up her own imaginary language and place – Lolaland.
45	19	"Will You Please Stop Messing About"	Kitty Taylor	Dave Ingham	Michelle Dabbs	15 January 2007
Mom has told Charlie and Lola that they must do many chores, or else Charlie won't be able to watch his favourite TV show, Space Family Hudson. But all Lola seems to want to do is play games.
46	20	"I Completely Know About Guinea Pigs"	Kitty Taylor	Laura Beaumont & Paul Larson	Chris Drew	15 January 2007
Lola wants to look after Bert, the class guinea pig, over vacation. Lola figures out how to look after guinea pigs properly, and is allowed to bring Bert home. At first, all is well, but then Bert goes missing.
47	21	"I Will Not Ever Never Forget You, Nibbles"	Kitty Taylor	Anna Starkey	Michelle Dabbs	26 February 2007
Charlie and Lola get a pet mouse, which they name Nibbles. Nibbles can do lots of tricks, and they love him very much. But eventually, Nibbles dies, and the siblings must learn to cope with the melancholy of losing a pet.
48	22	"Never Ever Never Step on the Cracks"	Kitty Taylor	Samantha Hill	Trevor Ricketts	26 February 2007
Lola is very superstitious and gullible. She hops to bed so some "living sea plants" won't tickle her, sleeps tightly so the bed bugs won't bite, washes really hard behind her ears so mushrooms won't grow there, and turns around three times when she sees a magpie. Charlie quickly regrets it when he tells her not to step on the cracks in the pavement, or else the bears, crocodiles and lions that live underneath will get her.
49	23	"Look After Your Planet"	Kitty Taylor	Bridget Hurst	Chris Drew	12 March 2007
After Charlie convinces Lola to recycle her old toys instead of throwing them away, Lola discovers a recycling competition. If she can recycle one hundred plastic, metal and paper items, she can get her very own real live tree to plant. But she only has two weeks, so Lola decides to ask her classmates to help. They turn out to be extremely very good recyclers indeed.
50	24	"Too Many Big Words"	Kitty Taylor	Carol Noble	Chris Drew	12 March 2007
Lola is learning to count and read at school. But she finds it very difficult and does not like it. Eventually, Charlie persuades her not to give up, and helps her read about Piccolo, a little bird who cannot sing.
51	25	"You Can Be My Friend"	Kitty Taylor	Carol Noble	Trevor Ricketts	20 April 2007
While Marv's father takes him and Charlie to the insect house, Lola is left in the company of Marv's little brother, Morten. But Morten is rather quiet and shy, and doesn't seem to want to play any of the games that Lola suggests.
52	26	"I Wish I Could Draw Exactly More Like You"	Kitty Taylor	Laura Beaumont & Paul Larson	David Stoten	20 April 2007
Charlie, Marv, Lola, and Lotta all have to draw pictures of their houses for a school project. They all have their own ways of drawing and look at some famous paintings for inspiration.

=== Season 3 (2007–2008) ===
No. overall	No. in season	Title	Directed by	Written by	Storyboarded by	Original release date
53	1	"I Really Absolutely Must Have Glasses"	Kitty Taylor	Bridget Hurst	Chris Drew	17 November 2007
Lola is refusing to go to the optician until she sees her classmate Minnie with beautiful glasses. When she goes to the optician, she finds out that she does not require glasses. At home, Charlie helps Lola make her own glasses. At school the next day, Lola, Lotta, and Minnie are wearing their own glasses and are happy.
54	2	"Thunder Completely Does Not Scare Me"	Kitty Taylor	Anna Starkey	Chris Drew	27 November 2007
A thunderstorm is approaching, and Lola is afraid of the thunderclaps. Charlie teaches Lola about weather during thunderstorms and helps her overcome her fear of thunderstorms.
55	3	"I Slightly Want to Go Home"	Kitty Taylor	Samantha Hill	David Stoten	28 November 2007
Lola is very excited to have her first sleepover with her best friend, Lotta. However, when Lola discovers all of the things different in Lotta's nightly routine, Lola becomes homesick.
56	4	"I Am Extremely Absolutely Boiling"	Kitty Taylor	Bridget Hurst	Michelle Dabbs	29 November 2007
On a hot day, Charlie and Lola decide to go outside to be joined later by Arnold Wolf. When Arnold spills Lola's fresh ice cream and refuses to share some of his ice cream, Lola becomes furious at Arnold and decides to not be friends with him anymore. Charlie tries his best to try and get Lola to like Arnold again.
57	5	"I Can Train Your Dog"	Kitty Taylor	Bridget Hurst	Chris Drew	30 November 2007
Marv's mother says Sizzles is naughty, so the pair train him. Later, the dog eats Morten's sausages.
58	6	"Do Not Ever Never Let Go"	Kitty Taylor	Dave Ingham	Michelle Dabbs	3 December 2007
When Lola takes her old tricycle to the park, she discovers her best friend, Lotta, has got a new bicycle with training wheels from her cousin. Lola struggles to keep up on the tricycle, and wants a proper bicycle. Charlie decides to give his old bicycle to Lola, who learns how to ride it with the training wheels. The next day, Lotta rides the new bike again, but without the training wheels. Lola feels like she should ride her bike without the wheels as well, but realizes that it is much harder.
59	7	"Our Shop Sells Everything"	Kitty Taylor	Anna Starkey	David Stoten	4 December 2007
Lola and Lotta are pretending to operate a store with a cash register of Lotta's. When Morten comes across the store outside, Lola and Lotta try everything to sell something to him until they sell Charlie's swimming goggles. Charlie, however, was about to go swimming.
60	8	"I Am Inventing a Usefullish Invention"	Kitty Taylor	Samantha Hill	Michelle Dabbs	5 December 2007
Charlie and Marv are working on a school project about creating a new invention. When they struggle to think of anything, Lola joins in to try and make something. Just before the boys are about to give up, Lola stumbles across an idea that may help.
61	9	"But We Always Do It Like This"	Kitty Taylor	Samantha Hill	Tim Fehrenbach	6 December 2007
When Charlie and Lola go to the beach by their grandparents' house, they begin their tradition of building a sand castle. However, a girl named Clem becomes curious about the summer's castle. Clem examines Lola's shells, takes Lola's spade, erratically places seashells on the castle, and accidentally falls on the castle.
62	10	"I Can't Stop Hiccupping!"	Kitty Taylor	Dave Ingham	David Stoten	7 December 2007
When Lola and Lotta try practicing a springtime song performance for school, Lola starts laughing to the point of hiccupping. With the play just days away, Lola tries all sorts of methods recommended by her friends to try to get rid of the hiccups.
63	11	"I Am Completely Hearing and Also Listening"	Kitty Taylor	Carol Noble	James O'Shea	10 December 2007
Charlie and Lola just received a new puppet stage to build. When Charlie tries to read the assembly instructions, Lola doesn't pay attention and constructs the stage incorrectly. Throughout the day, Lola discovers her inability to listen to instructions. She forgets her umbrella, gets her elephant puppet all wet, spills water, and more.
64	12	"But I Don't Really Like This Present"	Kitty Taylor	Bridget Hurst	Michelle Dabbs	11 December 2007
After a summer vacation, Lola and Lotta do their traditional gift swap. Lola receives a hat from Lotta, but doesn't like it. Initially, she tries to avoid wearing the hat in public. However, when she accepts the gift for what it is, Lola loses the hat in the wind.
65	13	"I Can Dance Like a Dancer"	Kitty Taylor	Anna Starkey	David Stoten	12 December 2007
Lola tries different types of dancing.
66	14	"Help! I Really Mean It!"	Kitty Taylor	Anna Starkey	Joe Brumm	4 April 2008
Lola keeps annoying Charlie by repeatedly asking him for help when she doesn't need it. Soon, this becomes a problem when Lola genuinely needs help retrieving Casper from a tree and Charlie doesn't bother with it.
67	15	"I Would Like to Actually Keep It"	Kitty Taylor	Dave Ingham	Trevor Ricketts	5 April 2008
Lola finds someone else's toy at her school, and isn't sure if she should keep it or not.
68	16	"It's Raining, It's Boring"	Kitty Taylor	Samantha Hill	Michelle Dabbs	6 April 2008
It's raining outside, and Charlie and Lola have nothing to do. They go to Marv's house for some games and activities, but Lola has trouble with most of them.
69	17	"I Am Goody the Good"	Kitty Taylor	Carol Noble	Michelle Dabbs	7 April 2008
Lola tries to be helpful all the time. When her behavior leads to the destruction of schoolwork Charlie is doing, he thinks that Lola has gone too far.
70	18	"It is Very Special and Extremely Ancient"	Kitty Taylor	Dave Ingham	David Stoten	8 April 2008
Lola and Lotta learn about fossils.
71	19	"What Can I Wear for Halloween?"	Kitty Taylor	Carol Noble	Trevor Ricketts	15 April 2008
Lola can't decide on a costume for Halloween.
72	20	"But Marv is Absolutely Charlie's Best Friend"	Kitty Taylor	Anna Starkey	David Stoten	16 April 2008
While Charlie and Marv play a game called "Squidbones", Lola thinks it sounds like arguing, and is convinced that Charlie and Marv are not friends anymore. Later, after writing a letter that says "From Charlie", Charlie explains that he was just playing "Squidbones" with Marv, and they weren't arguing after all.
73	21	"I Am Making a Craze"	Kitty Taylor	Carol Noble	David Stoten	17 April 2008
After seeing the other kids at her school playing with hula hoops, Lola decides to make her own craze.
74	22	"But Where Completely Are We?"	Kitty Taylor	Samantha Hill	Chris Drew	18 April 2008
Charlie and Lola camp outside in the garden.
75	23	"I Really, Really Need Actual Ice Skates"	Kitty Taylor	Bridget Hurst	Chris Drew	21 April 2008
When Lola goes ice skating with her friend Morten, she absolutely and extremely must have her own skates so she can be the very best skater in the whole school. Charlie reminds her that her guitar and yo-yo which she really, really wanted ended up in the unused closet, but she is certain this time will be different. Will Lola still be enthusiastic when skating turns out to be trickier and more wobbly than it looks?
76	24	"I Wish I Could Do That and Also That Too"	Kitty Taylor	Dave Ingham	Chris Drew	22 April 2008
Lola promises to play beads with her friend from school, but then Marv invites her to his space party on the same day! She did promise, but there's going to be games and cake at Marv's house.
77	25	"I Am Going to Save a Panda"	Kitty Taylor	Bridget Hurst	David Stoten	23 April 2008
It's Save an Animal Week at school, and Lola and Lotta are going to raise money to save a panda. To do this, Lola gets sponsored to hop for as long as she can, and Lotta will skip. But then Lola gets chicken pox. Now how will she save a giant panda?
78	26	"I've Got Nobody to Play With"	Kitty Taylor	Bridget Hurst	Michelle Dabbs	24 April 2008
In the series finale, Lola wants to play with Charlie, but he is going to the Sports Centre with Marv. When Lola finds it difficult to play alone and all her friends are too busy to play, she feels lonely. That is until she remembers who she can always play with: Soren Lorenson.

=== Seasonal specials (2006–2007) ===
Title	Directed by	Written by	Storyboarded by	Original release date
"How Many More Minutes Until Christmas?"	Kitty Taylor	Dave Ingham and Carol Noble	David Stoten	25 December 2006
Lola is very excited for Christmas, but her Christmas is about to be ruined when she mixes Lotta's card for Father Christmas' by accident. When Charlie and Lola find that the door for Christmas Day on their advent calendar has been lost, they make their own door on the calendar, making their way to the magic elves at the North Pole.
"Everything is Different and Not the Same"	Kitty Taylor	Anna Starkey	David Stoten	3 November 2007
It is the beginning of Autumn term at school, and Lola finds that everything is different. She and Lotta have new sitting places, she has a new teacher, the school smells funny, and the leaves have fallen off of her favourite tree. Meanwhile, Charlie and Marv create a time capsule for the Autumn Fair.

=== Webisode ===
1. I'm Far Too Busy Playing to Do Computers
