= Cathy Tyson =

British actress

- Born: Catherine Tyson; Kingston-upon-Thames, Surrey, England
- Occupation: Actress
- Years active: 1984–present
- Spouse: Craig Charles (m. 1984; div. 1989)
- Children: 1

Catherine Tyson is a British actress. She became known for her performance in the 1986 film Mona Lisa, which earned her the Los Angeles Film Critics Association Award for Best Supporting Actress, as well as nominations for Best Supporting Actress at the Golden Globes and BAFTA Awards. She has starred in many films and TV series since, including The Serpent and the Rainbow (1988), Priest (1994), and Band of Gold (1995–1997). She won the BAFTA for Best Supporting Actress in 2022 for her performance in the telefilm Help, and appears in the third and fourth series of BBC drama Blue Lights (2025 and 2026).

== Early life and education ==
Cathy Tyson was born in Kingston-upon-Thames, the daughter of an English social worker mother and a Trinidadian barrister father. She grew up in Liverpool, having moved there with her parents when she was two years old.

She was a pupil at St Winifred's School in Toxteth, Liverpool. She attended Liverpool's Everyman Youth Theatre in her teens, and dropped out of college at 17 to pursue an acting career there.

After undertaking many roles on stage and screen, Tyson enrolled at the adult learning centre City Lit on an access to higher education course in creative studies in September 2009. She completed a degree in English and Drama at Brunel University in 2013.

== Career ==
Tyson joined the Royal Shakespeare Company in 1984, taking the lead role in their performance of Golden Girls. Also in 1984, Tyson made an early TV appearance playing Joanna in Scully.

Tyson's film debut was in Mona Lisa (1986) as Simone, an elegant prostitute, a performance which brought her critical acclaim. Her other films include Business as Usual (1987), The Serpent and the Rainbow (1988), The Lost Language of Cranes (1991), Priest (1994) and The Old Man Who Read Love Stories (2001). One of her best-known television appearances was also as a prostitute, Carol Johnson, in the ITV series Band of Gold.

In 2007, Tyson joined the cast of two long-running television series. She played headmistress Miss Gayle in the BBC One school drama Grange Hill, and featured in the ITV soap opera Emmerdale as single mother Andrea Hayworth. Tyson played Herodia in BBC Three's Liverpool Nativity, a modern adaptation of the traditional Christmas story. Recorded as a live event in Liverpool City Centre on 16 December 2007, it was broadcast several times over the Christmas period and repeated the following year.

Between September 2009 and 2013, Tyson undertook further studies.

In 2015, she played the role of Marie Curie in the play Radiance by Alan Alda. In 2018, Tyson played DI Siobhan Clarke in the stage play Rebus: Long Shadows, written by Rona Munro and Ian Rankin. In 2020, Tyson was cast as the second titular character in the CBeebies series JoJo & Gran Gran.

In 2021, she guest starred in an episode of TV drama McDonald & Dodds. In 2021, Tyson also appeared in Channel 4 film Help playing Poll, an elderly resident of a care home during the COVID-19 pandemic; the following year she won the British Academy Television Award for Best Supporting Actress for her performance. She directed and acted in a short film, Lilian (2022) about the WAAF Lilian Bader.

In 2023, she appeared as Maureen in the film Bank of Dave. She also produced the short film The Consequence, which won the Jury Prize at the 2024 Romford Film Festival.

In 2024, she played Sam in Luna Carmoon's debut feature Hoard, and Mother Superior Raquella Berto-Anirul in Dune: Prophecy. She also played one of the Furies, Alecto, in the TV series Kaos. Over Christmas 2024, she performed as Mrs Higgins in My Fair Lady at the Curve Theatre, Leicester. In 2025, she appeared in the third series of BBC drama Blue Lights.

== Charity work ==
As of 2009 Dyson was an honorary patron of the London children's charity Scene & Heard.

== Personal life ==
Tyson married actor and comedian Craig Charles in 1984. They have a son together, but separated when he was two months old, and divorced in 1989.

== Awards and nominations ==
Year	Nominated work	Category	Award	Result	Notes	Ref.
1986	Mona Lisa	Actress in a Leading Role	40th British Academy Film Awards	Nominated		
1987	Mona Lisa	Best Supporting Actress - Motion Picture	44th Golden Globe Awards	Nominated		
2002	Night and Day	Best Actress	The British Soap Awards	Nominated		
2022	Help	Best Supporting Actress	2022 British Academy Television Awards	Won		
2022	JoJo & Gran Gran	Performer	British Academy Children's Awards 2022	Nominated		
