= Gogs =

Welsh TV series

- Cast of Gogs, left to right; Therizinosaur, Gwj, Ogla, Ogo, Goglas, Igi, and Gogas.
- Created by: Siôn Jones, Deiniol Morris, Michael Mort
- Directed by: Deiniol Morris, Michael Mort
- Country of origin: Wales
- No. of series: 2
- No. of episodes: 13 (+1 special) (list of episodes)

Production
- Producers: Michael Mort, Deiniol Morris, Helen Nabarro, Colin Rose
- Running time: 5 minutes 30 minutes (Gogwana)
- Production company: Aaargh! Animation

Original release
- Network: S4C, BBC Two
- Release: 21 December 1993 – 25 December 1998

Gogs is a Welsh claymation animated comedy television series created by Siôn Jones, Deiniol Morris, and Michael Mort and produced by Aaargh! Animation. The series is about the antics of the eponymous family of stereotypical dim-witted cavemen, which take the form of frequent slapstick and gross-out humour with no spoken dialogue.

The series consists of 13 five-minute episodes and a 30-minute special. The first series of five episodes aired on S4C in 1993 and received wider attention when they aired on BBC Two in 1996. This was followed by a second series of eight episodes which aired in 1997, and the series concluded with the 30-minute special Gogwana in 1998, both of which first aired on BBC Two.

The series was well-received, winning a number of international awards.

== History ==
=== Development ===
In the Welsh language, the term 'Gogs' is slang for 'Gogledd' which translates as 'North' and 'gogs' as 'Northerners'. The Welsh creators of the show - Deiniol Morris, Sion Jones and Michael Mort - decided that the single syllable word 'Gog' had just the right sound and a simple, direct quality which seemed to lend itself well to the primitive nature of the cave family.

Production of the pilot episode was a collaboration between numerous companies and individuals in 1993. Welsh animation studio Aaargh! Animation Ltd was then created specifically for the purpose of making the 'Gogs' series as a result of the success of the initial pilot episode created by Deiniol Morris, Siôn Jones and Michael Mort.

Aaargh! Animation Ltd. later went on to produce the animated segments of the 1997 film A Life Less Ordinary, and numerous TV commercials including ones for Levi jeans.

Welsh channel S4C originally commissioned the pilot episode of Gogs. This episode was originally only aired on Welsh television and was mainly funded by S4C.

The pilot episode script, originally entitled 'Y Cymro Cyntaf' ('The First Welshmen') centred around the idea of a group of cavemen discovering fire and then losing it immediately but after Deiniol enlisted fellow animator and Newport College alumnus Michael Mort to join the project early on, the concept was reworked to incorporate the classic family structure (which did not feature in the initial treatment). Mort also introduced the dinosaur element to the show as an homage to classic Ray Harryhausen movies. Mort was also responsible for designing and building the characters, as well as storyboarding, co-directing and animating the pilot episode.

After the success of the pilot episode, Michael and Deiniol went on to form Aaargh! Animation to produce two more series of five-minute episodes. Sion Jones continued to be involved as a script writer and set builder over the course of the production. Deiniol subsequently directed the half hour special Gogwana, which was to be the series' finale.

After the Gogs TV show was cancelled, Aaargh! Animation was dissolved, and Mort and Morris parted company. Deiniol Morris and Sion Jones did not subsequently pursue careers in the animation industry. Mort continued working in the field, directing many commercials and creating the character of Chuck Steel, who went on to appear in a short film (Chuck Steel: Raging Balls of Steel Justice (2013) and a feature length movie (Chuck Steel: Night of the Trampires (2021).

=== Airings ===
The first series was initially brought to a minor Welsh audience by Meirion Davies of S4C in late 1993, complete with Welsh language titles and credits, and thereby less suitable for English language channels. Gogs sprung onto an international platform with the help of Colin Rose at the BBC, who had the show translated for an English-speaking audience and aired on BBC Two during the 1996 Christmas season. The Gogs did not use any language. This was a deliberate move by the creators of the show as it would make Gogs a better commercial prospect for prospective commissioners S4C by eliminating the costly need to translate and re-dub the voices and would also cut production costs by saving time in overdubbing and animating lip sync. After this, a second series, Gogs II, was produced and aired in 1997, and in 1998 the Gogwana 30-minute special and finale. The show also aired in the United States as a segment on The Three Friends and Jerry on Fox Family in 1998.

=== Later history and stalled film ===
Both series of Gogs and the Gogwana special were critically well-received and garnered numerous awards. However, Gogwana would prove to be the last ever episode of the show. The high costs of producing claymation compared to the emerging sophistication of computer animation (one episode of Gogs took a very long time to produce with the small team, little resources and funding they had), and the prime time slot allocated to Gogs which would be better filled with "more conventional" sitcoms, ensured that Gogs was not commissioned for a third series or another special by the BBC.

Steven Spielberg and his newly-founded DreamWorks Pictures had recently attempted to retain the services of Nick Park, head of British animation studio Aardman Animations and creator of Wallace and Gromit, to make an animated film set during the stone age; however, Aardman "resisted being bought by Hollywood lock stock and barrel." Shortly afterwards, Spielberg saw the first episode of Gogs, which revolves around the consequences of the Gogs discovering fire for the first time; Spielberg, being impressed by it, offered Gogs creators Deiniol Morris and Michael Mort work in the United States instead of Aardman. Morris and Mort met with Spielberg at his studio and admitted that they would be tempted by an offer to produce a theatrical Gogs film with DreamWorks, although no deal was made and there were no further developments to the plan.

DreamWorks later resumed their contract with Park and Aardman, resulting in the films Chicken Run and Flushed Away. In 2005, Aardman announced that they were working with DreamWorks on an animated caveman comedy without Aaargh!; it was to be called Crood Awakening, in which a clan chief is threatened by the arrival of a prehistoric genius who comes up with revolutionary new inventions like fire. Co-written by John Cleese, it eventually became the 2013 film The Croods.

== Plot ==
The series depicts the Gogs comically as being mind-bogglingly stupid and struggling to navigate and avoid the perils of an exotic, prehistoric land inhabited by dinosaurs, prehistoric mammals, giant insects, human-eating plants, and other exotica. Even the primeval landscape is a danger, likely to erupt in a volcano or collapse in an earthquake, and the world is wracked by powerful lightning and thunderstorms.

Among the show's key comedic aspects are crudeness and toilet humour; the characters do not talk, instead communicating with grunts, roars, screams, burps and farts, and overly exaggerated facial expressions. The rest of the show had an emphasis on slapstick, cartoonish violence as the Gogs spend the rest of their time wrestling, urinating, vomiting, bashing each other on the head with clubs, and scoffing food. The show was criticized by some for being too over the top.

== Cast ==
=== Gogs ===
- Gogas – The "grandfather figure" of the Gog family and elderly patriarch of the clan. Gogas is derived from two Welsh words 'go' and 'cas'. They translate into English as 'quite' and 'nasty': a quite accurate description of the sometimes-maniacal grandfather. Gogas has a bald patch, white hair, and unkempt facial hair. He is completely senile, hot-headed, uncouth and crude, and wants to do things all his own way. His most prized possession is his club, and his solution to pretty much any problem is to bash it with it. Gogas is surprisingly one of the more physical of the group, often being the first to fight off giant bears and hungry dinosaurs with his club, although this is down to his craziness rather than bravery. At night, he snores like a wailing coyote. In the "Gogwana" special, Gogas is given a small backstory.
- Goglas – The "father figure" of the clan. From the Welsh language word 'goglais' which translates to 'tickle'. Goglas is the middle-aged son of the elderly "grandfather figure" Gogas. Goglas has a Neanderthal-like face, shoulder length dark hair, and a dark cropped beard. Goglas is a slobby and lazy lay-about, mostly concerned with idling around and living life his own way. Although he occasionally goes out hunting, he is often the first to run away from danger and abandon his family in cowardly fashion and is not averse to leaving them behind in such situations. Goglas often fights with his teenage son Ogo and his bear-like wife Ogla who, despite often crudely fighting with him, also gives him somewhat unwanted affection.
- Ogla – The "mother figure" of the clan, and Goglas' mate. Ogla is derived from 'Oglau' and is the colloquial North Walian Welsh word for 'smell'. Enormous, bear-like and bossy, she is the matriarch of the family. None dare challenge her. Though at times disgusted and disliking of the rest of her family, she does care for them deep down, particularly her baby Gwj, when she is not kicking Gwj around. Ogla keeps her dark hair tied with bones.
- Ogo – The son and firstborn of Goglas and Ogla. Ogo is named after creators Siôn Jones and Deiniol Morris' history teacher during their schooldays. 'Ogo' being a shortened version of ogof, the Welsh word for 'cave'. Ogo is a teenager. Has a simian expression and has ginger hair which sometimes appears blonde. This is due to inconsistent film developing because the model itself has ginger hair. He is extremely slow and dim-witted, the dumbest of the clan, yet is constantly trying to impress and follow the orders of the others. He always fails however and usually gets covered in mess or his teeth knocked out. Most of the rest of the time, all he does is pick his nose and eat it, or chases animals such as centipedes and eats them instead.
- Igi – The hippie and pacifist daughter, presumably a teenager like Ogo, although younger than Ogo. She has shoulder-length black hair which also covers her eyes. Igi is the smartest of all the Gogs, even something of a genius many millennia ahead of her time, drawing things such as scientific equations and blueprints of cars, planes and helicopters on rocks. She invents things such as a bird-costume and a hot-air balloon made out of a dinosaur's carcass in the half-hour special Gogwana. She is the quietest and least obscene member of the clan. However, also being the smallest and physically weakest, Igi is often victimized or misunderstood, or left behind when the rest are fleeing from danger. Her grandfather Gogas hits her over the head with a club when he sees her advanced drawings, although they give Gogas the idea to build a swing for baby Gwj, which subsequently has been mistakenly taken as some ceremonial building such as Stonehenge.
- Gwj – The infant and second son and lastborn of Goglas and Ogla. His name is derived from the nickname of co-originator Deiniol Morris' brother-in-law. It also has elements of the term of endearment "coochie coo" used for babies. He is cute at a first glance, but is actually very brave, tough and sneaky. Gwj is sometimes subjected to the same cartoonish violence as the others and kicked off screen by the others when they cannot be doing with him, although Gwj is never injured and indeed seems the hardiest of the entire clan, laughing in the face of danger instead of running away from danger like the rest of them. What Gwj spends most of his time doing is crying and screaming (Composer Arwyn Davies sampled the screams and weaved them into the theme tune of the Gogs series), and the other Gogs have to desperately find ways to get him to stop. Besides that, he often defecates and gets into horrible messes a lot, and into very sticky situations (usually at the same time). Gwj often has snotty, horrible colds, and sometimes blows snot at the screen.

=== Cannibal tribe ===
Main antagonist of Gogwana.

- Cannibal pygmies
- Cannibal chieftain

=== Animals ===
==== Ray the T-Rex ====
A major supporting character and the primary antagonist of the show, Ray is a ravenous Tyrannosaurus rex who is frequently attempting to eat the Gog family clan and is constantly stalking them wherever they go. In the first episode, when the characters are introduced in the opening credits, the T-Rex is said to be named Ray. Ray is used a designation for the T-Rex at other points in the show also. The name was in homage to the artist, designer and early model animator Ray Harryhausen. Ray's obsession with the Gogs may be as much down to revenge as hunger, as also in the first episode Ray is thwarted from eating the Gogs by having his private parts burnt by fire. In the second episode, Oglas and Ogo flee from the small dinosaur, only to discover a massive T-Rex which chases them off a cliff. Ray continues to appear in several episodes in the first series and in the half-hour special Gogwana.

Ray's depiction is inconsistent. In the first episode Ray is smaller and faster (perhaps a juvenile T-Rex), and in the film Gogwana he is depicted as slower but larger and generally more menacing. In Gogwana Ray, who is again stalking the Gogs, inadvertently saves them when he eats the new antagonist, the Cannibal King. There are other assorted dinosaurs featured throughout the episodes, but Ray is the only one who makes more than one appearance. One model was made for the series episodes, and a larger, more menacing model was made for use in Gogwana.

==== Other animals seen ====
- A prehistoric mole is a recurring animal in the first series. Gogas is often seen trying to club the mole.
- In the sixth episode, Igi sees a giant eagle flying above the ground, which inspires her to make a bird costume. The eagle was almost hit by an arrow from Oglas and Gogas's bow-and-arrow.
- In the third episode, Oglas and Ogo find a human sized, Therizinosaur eating leaves. It soon notices them and continues to beat them up with martial arts.
- In the seventh episode, Ogo is attacked by a Metridiochoerus whilst tied to a tree. The boar then chases Oglas and Gogas, making them fall down a hole. The tree Ogo is attached to is thrown over the pit. The boar continues to urinate and defecate on them until Ogla scares the boar away.
- In the third episode, a thunderstorm occurs, driving the Gogs to find shelter. Ogo climbs up a tree and finds a leaf to shelter under, which came from a pteranodon's nest. It then carries Ogo in the air and, later in the show, Ogla as well. These creatures are seen numerous times throughout the show.
- A Brontosaurus is seen in the third episode where it died apparently from old age and again in the fifth episode where another one fell into a crack in the ground that opened during a volcanic eruption, however it poked its head up, meaning it survived.
- Trilobites are seen in the final half-hour special Gogwana, which although were marine animals in reality they are seen scuttling along the ground, alongside many other creatures with which they did not co-exist.
- A Gigantopithecus mother and its baby appeared in a second-season episode. The mother had lost her baby and had mistakenly taken Girj, she later got her baby after having a fight with Ogla who tried to get Girj back; however, her baby had stolen Gogas's club and hit her on the head with it.
- A Triceratops skull is seen in the desert, also in Gogwana. In the same scene numerous creatures are seen – a pair of unidentified furry desert creatures, perhaps the ancestors of rabbits, vultures, and a desert Dimetrodon. The Gogs take refuge in the hulking carcass of a dead woolly mammoth which had evidently veered mistakenly into the desert.
- An Allosaurus the one-time antagonist appears in one episode babysitting and about to eat Girj while still asleep and trying to eat Ogo but gets killed off by Igi who saves their lives.
- A Yeti, another one-time main antagonist appeared in the final episode of the second series. Ogo encounters the angry Yeti while fishing. Gogas with a sore back comes to the rescue yet the Yeti fixes Gogas's back when it grabs him and chases after Ogo riding on his frozen father Oglas like a snowmobile. Luckily Girj was hiding in backpack filled with fishes to knock the yeti off. Eventually when the Yeti is feeling happy by wearing Oglas's footwear and made friends with Gogas, who is enjoying eating fish and chatting with the Yeti.
- A Cave Bear appeared in the second season. It went into the Gogs cave looking for a place to hibernate whilst they were out fishing and then forced the Gogs out when they came back. After several unsuccessful attempts to get it out they managed to lure it out using some fish.
- A Hypsilophodon appeared in a second-season episode. It encountered the Gogs and was captured by them. However, before they could eat it, they got into an argument and whilst rowing the Hypsilophodon managed to chew through the ropes that held it and escaped.
- In "Gogwana", a dead Dimetrodon is seen as the Gogs are exploring the jungle oasis. It is later inflated into a large hot air balloon in the final sequence to help the Gogs escape the cannibal tribe.

== List of Gogs episodes ==
=== Named episodes ===
1. Fire – the English-language pilot, Fire, premiered on BBC2, 21 December 1996 at 8.50pm.
2. Stone Circle
3. Hunt
4. Cave
5. Earthquakes
6. Inventions
7. Trappers
8. Illness
9. Bear
10. Gramps RIP
11. Apes and Men
12. Babysitting
13. Snow
14. Gogwana Special (1998 finale)

== Reception ==
=== Critical ===
Based on 241 user ratings, Gogs has a weighted average vote of 7.5 out of 10 on the Internet Movie Database. Of the IMDB users who rated the show, 43.2% rated it 10 out of 10.

=== Awards ===
==== Series ====
Gogs received international acclaim and won several awards, initially winning "Yr Animeiddio Gorau" (Welsh for Best Animation) for four years running in 1995, 1996, 1997, and 1998 at the Welsh BAFTA Cymru. Again, in 1995 the show won the international Children's BAFTA Award for Best Animation, and in the 1996 international BAFTAs, Gogs won the entry for Best Animation.In June 1996, Gogs won the award for best animation at the Banff television festival in Canada.

==== Gogwana extended finale ====
The thirty-minute-long special in 1998, Gogwana, which wrapped up the show, was also well received, winning several awards. These included the Banff Rockie award for Best Animation Program Award at the 1999 Banff Television Festival, and the Audience Award for Best Film at the Rio de Janeiro Anima Mundi Animation Festival. It won Best Children's Series at the 1998 British Animation Awards and was nominated for Best Animated Short Film at the 1999 international BAFTAs.

== Home media ==
Both the first and second series of Gogs were released separately on VHS in 1997 by Warner Vision International with a parental guidance rating. With the airing of the thirty-minute long special Gogwana in 1998, Gogwana was also released separately on VHS.

Gogs was released as a Region 2 DVD on 9 April 2001 also by Warner Vision International. The DVD contains all thirteen episodes of both series, including the 30-minute special "Gogwana", all on a single disc, with a total run-time of 89 minutes. Special features include a rare photo gallery.
