= Charlie and Lola =

Fictional characters

The first book, I Will Never Not Ever eat a Tomato (US title, later printing with Greenaway Medal seal, 2000)

Charlie and Lola Sonner are fictional children created by the English writer and illustrator Lauren Child in 2000. They were introduced in a series of picture books and later adapted as animated television characters. Lola is an energetic and imaginative little girl; Charlie is her kind and patient older brother who is always willing to help Lola learn and grow. Charlie and Lola's parents, as well as their friends' parents, are often mentioned, but never seen.

== History ==
The series' first book is I Will Not Ever Never Eat a Tomato, published by Orchard Books in 2000. The U.S. edition was published in the same year by Candlewick Press, with the title: I Will Never NOT EVER Eat a Tomato. For that first book in the series, Child won the 2000 Kate Greenaway All-Medal Trophy from the Library Association, recognising the year's best children's book illustration by a British subject. For the 50th anniversary of the Medal (1955–2005) it was named one of the top ten winning works, selected by a 2007 panel to compose the ballot for a public election of the all-time favourite.

In 2005, the series was made into an animated television show.

== Publications ==
- Snow Is My Favourite and My Best
- Excuse Me, But That Is My Book (TV episode title: "But That Is My Book")
- We Honestly Can Look After Your Dog (TV episode title: "We Do Promise Honestly We Can Look After Your Dog")
- My Wobbly Tooth Must Not Ever Never Fall Out (TV episode title: "I Do Not Ever Never Want My Wobbly Tooth to Fall Out")
- Say Cheese
- I'm Just Not Keen on Spiders
- Whoops! But It Wasn't Me! (TV episode title: "It Wasn't Me!")
- This Is Actually My Party
- I Can Do Anything That's Everything All on My Own
- You Can Be My Friend
- You Won't Like This Present as Much as I Do
- My School Play Sticker Book (based upon the episode "There Is Only One Sun and That Is Me")
- My Haircut Sticker Book (based upon the episode "I Like My Hair Completely the Way It Is")
- My Busy Sticker Book (based upon the episode "I'm Far Too Extremely Busy")
- My Wonderful Picnic Sticker Book (based upon the episode "The Most Wonderfullest Picnic in the Whole Wide World")

Various colouring books and a magazine are also available in the UK.

The "Charlie and Lola" books have been translated into Welsh under the name Cai a Lois and into many other languages.

== Characters ==
=== Primary ===
Charlie Sonner
Charlie is the imaginative and helpful older brother of Lola. He is seven years old and has platinum blond hair like Lola. Charlie is often asked to look after Lola, and he sometimes has to think of creative ways to keep her busy. In both the television series and the books, he breaks the fourth wall by talking about Lola to the viewers/readers.
Lola Sonner
Lola is an imaginative and quirky four-year-old girl. Lola is the younger sister of Charlie and is best friends with Lotta. She is described by her brother Charlie as "small and very funny". She likes playing and is full of character. She normally wears blue butterfly hairpins and has short blonde hair. She is often a drama queen. She also has an imaginary friend named Soren Lorenson.
Marv Lowe
Marv is Charlie's best friend. He has a younger brother named Morten and an older brother named Marty. Marv has a dachshund named Sizzles (wordplay on the type of dog, a "sausage dog") and a pet mouse named Squeak.
Lotta
Lotta is Lola's best friend, who is African-British. After meeting at school, they became friends quickly and spend a lot of time together. Lotta usually follows Lola's lead, and is in awe of Lola's brother Charlie, his friend Marv, and Sizzles the dog. She has black curly hair.
Soren Lorenson
Soren Lorenson is Lola's imaginary friend, rendered as monochrome and translucent. When Lola and Soren Lorenson are playing, he is rather detailed (has the look of a real person, only grey and translucent). When someone interrupts them (such as Charlie), he loses detail until the person who interrupted them leaves.

=== Minor characters ===
Minnie Reader
Minnie is a minor character in the show. She wears glasses and likes guinea pigs and ponies. Minnie is often seen with Evie.
Morten Lowe
Marv's younger brother and a friend of Lola's. He is quite shy, but once he starts to play, he proves to be a lot of fun.
Arnold Wolf
Charlie and Lola's next-door neighbour. Arnold is only featured in a few episodes, starting in "I Spy with My Little Eyes". When Arnold moves in, Lola and Soren Lorenson at first believe that an actual wolf has moved in next door (hence his name), though this turns out to be a misunderstanding when Charlie and Lola go over to check. In one episode, Arnold accidentally drops Lola's ice cream, but he makes it up to her by letting her use his paddling pool.
Granny and Grandpa
Charlie and Lola's grandparents. Granny paints for a hobby, while it appears that Grandpa is good with horses. Like all other adult characters, they are referred to but are never seen.
Mum and Dad
Charlie and Lola's parents. In the books, as well as all the adults, Mum and Dad are never seen, but mentioned.
Evie
A girl in Lola and Lotta's class. She has red hair which she wears in pigtails. She also wears a skirt, a long-sleeved shirt and striped tights.
Jack
Marv's cousin. When they first see him, Lola and Lotta at first believe he is Marv's new best friend after Charlie and Marv's "falling-out" in the episode "But Marv Is Absolutely Charlie's Best Friend", though this turns out to be a misunderstanding.

=== Background ===
Sizzles
Marv's dog. He is a Dachshund.
Nibbles
Charlie and Lola's short-lived mouse.
Squeak
Marv's white mouse. He can jump from one leg to another.
Bert
Lola's class guinea pig. Despite the name, Bert is actually a female guinea pig. At first, Charlie and Lola believe that Bert is a boy, until she gives birth to a litter of baby guinea pigs.
Tickles
Charlie and Lola's second mouse. He can easily tickle anyone, hence the name.
Casper
Charlie & Lola's grandparents' cat who comes to stay with Charlie and Lola sometimes.
Bat Cat
A character from one of Charlie and Lola's favourite comics. He is a grey/black cat that goes about doing heroic deeds. He is a parody of the superhero Batman.
Pirate Squidbones
Charlie and Marv's favourite cartoon, Pirate Squidbones tells of the adventures of a notorious one-eyed pirate and his "motley crew". Squidbones first appeared in "How Many More Minutes?". In the episode, Squidbones and his crew kidnap the Smiley Children and threaten to harm them if Charlie and Lola do not hand over their teeth. Thankfully, Charlie and Lola, with the help of the Tooth Fairy, are able to defeat Squidbones, and force him and his crew to walk the plank.
The Tooth Fairy
A fairy who takes teeth and leaves money. In the episode "How Many More Minutes?", she teams up with Charlie and Lola to defeat Pirate Squidbones and rescue the Smiley Children.
Smiley Children
A girl and a boy who have shiny clean teeth and always smile. They are later kidnapped by Pirate Squidbones and his crew, but are rescued by Charlie, Lola, and the Tooth Fairy.

=== Toys ===
Foxie
Lola's stuffed fox. It is her favourite toy. In the episode "What If I Get Lost in the Middle of Nowhere?", after a long search for her lost toy, she later comes to find out that she simply left it under her pillow.
Ellie
Lola's toy elephant. Ellie is a china elephant with nice pink flowery designs all over it.
Frog
Lola's springy frog that she keeps on her bed stand. Apparently, this is also Søren Lorenson's favourite toy; he plays with it when Lola's not around.
The Rocket
A class project of Charlie's making, the rocket is a model space rocket that won Charlie a First Place prize in school; he beat Marv and another boy named Harvey, but Lola in her curiosity had a bit of a mishap with it and broke the rocket. Charlie, not withstanding his crossness, was able to mend it like new.
Daisy
Lola's rag doll, she is a blonde doll wearing a pink dress and a bow to match in its hair. She has blue buttons for eyes.
Molly the Rabbit
An anthropomorphic female stuffed rabbit who's all pink with a red bow on its head. She is one of Lola's many stuffed animals.
Mr. Teddy
Charlie's former teddy bear from when he was Lola's age. He is yellow with green buttons for eyes and a blue bow tie. He now belongs to Lola.

== In other adaptations ==
=== Television series ===
The books have been adapted by Tiger Aspect into a cartoon series, using a collage style of animation which accurately captures the style of the original books. Directed by Kitty Taylor and Claudia Lloyd. 2D cel animation, paper cutout, fabric design, real textures, photomontage, and archive footage are all employed and subsequently animated in a software application called CelAction. The cartoons are also notable for their use of children's voices, rather than adult voice actors, a technique pioneered by the Peanuts television specials.

The first series of 26 episodes (11 minutes each) was first broadcast on 21 March 2005. The second series of 26 episodes (again, 11 minutes each) started broadcasting on CBeebies on 2 October 2006 (with the morning broadcast also being shown on BBC Two) a third series followed. In the television series, Charlie is seven and Lola is four, and goes to school (her teacher is called Mrs. Hansen). In episodes of both the first and second series, Charlie celebrates his birthday (in "It's a Secret..." and "This Is Actually My Party"), although this doesn't seem to affect his age in other episodes. The third series, a final 26-episode run, was broadcast in the UK and the US in the 2007-2008 television season. With two special episodes broadcast in 2006 and 2007, a total of 80 episodes were produced.

=== Theatre ===
Charlie and Lola's Best Bestest Play directed by Roman Stefanski with music by Julian Butler was first performed at Polka Theatre on 26 May 2008 and has subsequently been performed at the venue again in 2010 and 2012. Following a series of international tours, it was staged for the first time at Glow, the events and exhibition space at Bluewater in Kent, by Watershed Productions over the Christmas period of 2013.

Charlie and Lola's Best Bestest Play is based on the characters created by Lauren Child and adapted by Jonathan Lloyd, artistic director of Polka Theatre. A sequel, Charlie and Lola's Extremely New Play premiered at King's College School in 2012 before also touring internationally.

=== The Charlie and Lola album ===
Charlie and Lola's Favourite and Best Music Record was released on 19 March 2007, aimed at parents as well as children. The music is largely a development of existing interstitial and theme music taken from series 1 and 2. There are elements of easy listening, lounge, big band jazz, reggae, bluegrass, eastern European, sci-fi, Latin, classical and film music. There are 17 tracks plus one hidden track, with the programme's theme tune opening and closing the album.

Each track includes spoken word extracts from the series. In many cases, these are manipulated to fit with the musical accompaniment.

"The Bestest in the Barn" was released as a single on 12 March 2007. It features Lola and Lotta teaching various animals on their farm how to sing, dance and play music. This is the only track on the album which does not appear in any episode. Lola and Lotta do however appear as farmers in "I Do Not Ever Never Want My Wobbly Tooth To Fall Out". They also have a tendency to imagine that animals are capable of developing impressive human skills, as seen in "We Do Promise Honestly We Can Look After Your Dog" and "I Will Not Ever Never Forget You Nibbles". "The Bestest in the Barn" now features on a playlist of CBeebies programme music played throughout CBeebies Land at the Alton Towers Resort.

The album is a collaboration between various composers and musicians who write and perform for the TV series. Much of the music is programmed but many tracks feature performances by musicians from London-based bands – Menlo Park, Polar Bear and Acoustic Ladyland.

Four of the tracks have been animated by Tiger Aspect Productions: "The Bestest in the Barn", "Sizzles", "Batcat" and "It's Snowing". "The Bestest in the Barn" video is encoded as an mpeg on the album CD, and all four videos are included as DVD extras on the series 2 DVD collection.

==== Track listing ====
1. "Charlie and Lola Theme Tune"
2. "I Really Want to Play Music" (from "I Want to Play Music Too")
3. "The Bestest in the Barn"
4. "Boo!" (from "Boo! Made You Jump")
5. "Sizzles" (from "We Do Promise Honestly We Can Look After Your Dog")
6. "I Will Not Ever Never Eat A Tomato" (from episode of the same name)
7. "Milk Monkeys" (from "I Can Do Anything That's Everything All on My Own")
8. "Germs" (from "I'm Really Ever So Not Well")
9. "Magic" (from "I Am Extremely Magic")
10. "Bat Cat" (from "Lucky Lucky Me")
11. "Lolaland" (from "Welcome to Lolaland")
12. "Greendrops" (from "I Will Not Ever Never Eat a Tomato")
13. "I Am Not Sleepy" (from "I Am Not Sleepy and I Will Not Go to Bed")
14. "Martian Attack" (from "My Little Town")
15. "All Sleepy" (from "I Am Not Sleepy and I Will Not Go to Bed")
16. "Can You Maybe Turn the Light on?" (from episode of the same title)
17. "Charlie and Lola Theme Tune (Extended Version)"
18. "... It's Snowing" (secret track; from "Snow Is My Favourite and My Best")
19. "The Bestest in the Barn" (video)

==== Music credits ====
Theme Tune written by Tom Dyson and Soren Munk
Production & Arrangement with John Greswell

All other tracks written by John Greswell and produced by Greswell / Taylor for MPM London Ltd.

Except:

- 3 written by John Greswell, Christopher Taylor, Benjamin Nicholls
- 6, 12 written by John Greswell, Christopher Taylor
- 7 written by Tom Dyson, Soren Munk
- 16 written and produced by David Schweitzer

==== Additional musicians ====
- Andy Mellon – Trumpet / Flugelhorn / Piano / Vocals / Clarinet
- Benjamin Nicholls – Guitars / Banjo / Jew's harp / Double bass / Bass guitar
- Pete Wareham – Tenor saxophone / Trumpet
- Sebastian Rochford – Drums / Percussion
- Joe Bentley – Trombone

Demon Music Group Ltd.

BBC Worldwide Ltd.

All tracks published by Tiger Aspect / BMG Music Publishing

Sleeve Package design by David Mackintosh

=== Voices ===
- Charlie – Jethro Lundie-Brown (series 1), Daniel Mayers (series 2), Oriel Agranoff (series 3)
- Lola – Maisie Cowell (series 1), Clementine Cowell (series 2), Holly Callaway (series 3)
- Marv – Ryan Harris
- Lotta – Morgan Gayle
- Soren Lorenson – Stanley Street

=== Animation of promos ===
"The Bestest in the Barn", "Dancing Dogs", "Batcat" and "It's Snowing" promos were animated by Tiger Aspect Productions.

Tom Beattie, Betti Doherty, Alistair Douglas, Catherine T. Elliot, Tim Fehrenbach, Claudia Lloyd, James O'Shea, Caroline Parkinson, Mark Paterson, Steve Perkins, Kitty Taylor, Clare Winkworth, Andrew Zein.

== See also ==
- Wild Kratts
