= Suzanne Lang =

American writer

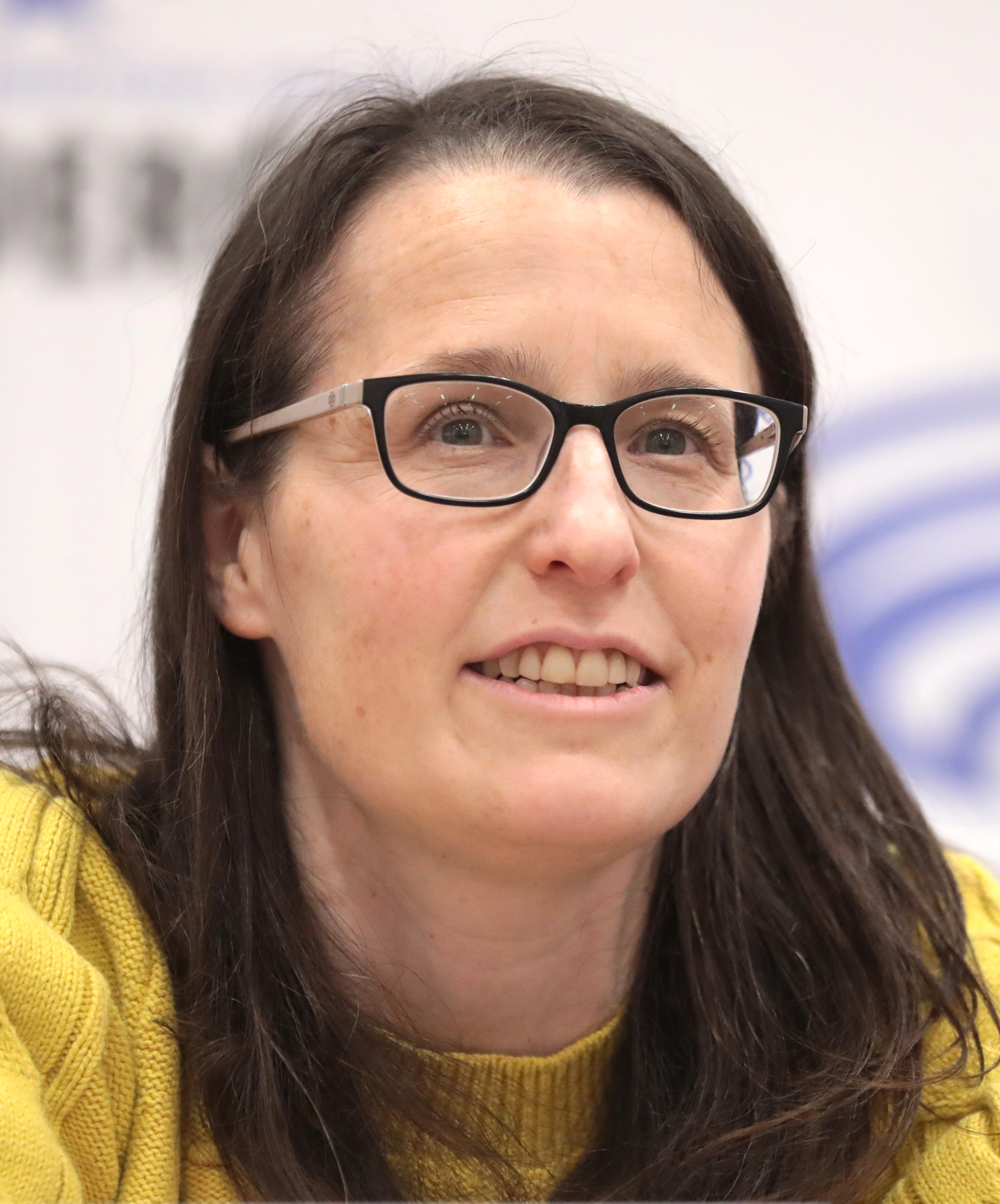
Lang at the 2023 WonderCon

Suzanne Lang is an American author of children's books and a television producer. She frequently partners with illustrator Max Lang, her husband.

Her book Grumpy Monkey, published in 2018, debuted at #8 on The New York Times bestseller list, reaching #1. The book spent 25 weeks on the list. Grumpy Monkey Party Time followed in 2019.

== Selected works ==
- Families, Families, Families!. Illustrated by Max Lang. Random House. 2015. ISBN 9780375974267.
- Hooray for Kids!. Illustrated by Max Lang. Random House. 2016. ISBN 9780553537833.
- All Kinds of Families. Illustrated by Max Lang. Random House. 2019. ISBN 9780553499407.

=== Grumpy Monkey ===
- Grumpy Monkey. Illustrated by Max Lang. Random House. 2018. ISBN 9780553537864.
- Grumpy Monkey Party Time. Illustrated by Max Lang. Random House. 2019. ISBN 9780593118627.
