= The Amazing Adrenalini Brothers =

Television series

- Created by: Dan Chambers; Mark Huckerby; Nick Ostler
- Voices of: Dan Chambers; Mark Huckerby; Nick Ostler; Manny Lipman
- Theme music composer: Paul James
- Countries of origin: United Kingdom; Canada
- Original language: English
- No. of episodes: 26 (78 segments)

Production
- Running time: 22 minutes (7 minutes per segment)
- Production companies: Pesky; Studio B Productions; Bejuba! Entertainment

Original release
- Network: CITV and Cartoon Network (United Kingdom); YTV and VRAK.TV (Canada)
- Release: March 2, 2006 – October 26, 2007

The Amazing Adrenalini Brothers is an animated television series created by Dan Chambers, Mark Huckerby, and Nick Ostler, known collectively as The Pox. Starting off as online shorts for the CBBC website in 2002, it was eventually commissioned as a full series by CITV and Cartoon Network in the United Kingdom, S4C in Wales, YTV and VRAK.TV in Canada. It is an international co-production between UK studio Pesky and Studio B Productions in Vancouver, British Columbia. A total of 26 episodes were produced and aired from March 2, 2006 until October 26, 2007.

The show's directors Claire Underwood and Dan Chambers and producer David Hodgson picked up the British Academy Children's Award for Animation in 2006.

== Overview ==
The show follows a trio of travelling showmen called the Adrenalini brothers who are hailing from the mysterious land of Réndøosîa (a fictional Eastern European country that experiences an unusually high rate of natural disasters to the point that its flag is always depicted with a hole in it, as well as being at war with the neighboring nation of Grimzimistan). Together, the Adrenalini brothers are named Xan, Enk, and Adi, and they travel across the world staging ridiculously hazardous stunts, usually succeeding (but more out of luck than skill). In their travels, they have visited many real countries and places in the world, and even many periods in history (and, in some cases, fiction). The brothers communicate only in their native language of Réndøosîan, and do not speak English.

== Cast and characters ==
- Dan Chambers as Xan, the oldest of the brothers. Xan acts as the ringmaster and leader who is constantly trying, and sometimes failing to keep the other two out of their own business. He often woos ladies on his travels, but mostly ends badly, especially when the lady is hideous or even a man. Xan sports purple sunglasses, a yellow bow tie, a gold tooth and a red flowing cape.
- Mark Huckerby as Enk, the baby and the smallest of the Adrenalini brothers. He is a small, sausage-shaped fellow with thin whiskers and little limbs. Enk has a catchphrase that goes "Eeeeee!" whenever he is falling or performing high speed acts. Enk's other things go terribly wrong.
- Nick Ostler as Adi, the largest and middle of the brothers who performs as a strongman. Adi is more or less an overgrown child and has a very mischievous streak to him. He wears blue overalls and has a very bushy beard.

== History ==
The series had its origins as a British student revue act at the University of Nottingham in the 1990s, written and performed by The Pox, aka Dan Chambers, Mark Huckerby and Nick Ostler. With ambitions to turn their live act into animation, the trio presented their ideas to Pesky, where Chambers was working as an animator, and who had just been approached by the BBC to develop a new animated series for the relaunch of its CBBC website.

The original 10 two-and-a-half-minute "shorts" were shown online, then on CBBC television in 2002 and the episode "Ocean of Terror" was awarded the Prix des Internautes at the Annecy International Animated Film Festival that summer, and went on in 2003 to win a People's Choice Award at Anima Mundi in Brazil.

By 2004, plans were hatched to create a longer-running television series based on the Adrenalini Brothers, and in 2005, a series of 78 seven-minute episodes went into production as a UK-Canadian co-production, with pre- and post-production by Pesky in their London studio, animation by Studio B in Vancouver, and scripting shared between writers on both sides of the Atlantic. The series first aired as part of Sunday Pants on Cartoon Network in the United States on 2 October 2005, and then it first aired as a full series in March 2006 on CITV in the UK, then YTV on 7 May 2006 (and later also VRAK.TV in Canada) followed by Cartoon Network across Europe and Asia. The series has enjoyed particular success in Australia where it was first aired by ABC Australia on 2 March 2006 in a regular early evening slot until 2010.

In 2006 the series began the year by picking up a Pulcinella Award at the Cartoons On The Bay festival in Italy and ended the year with the episode "Hunchback of Heartbreak" winning a BAFTA for Best Animation Series.

== Broadcast ==
The show aired on YTV and VRAK.TV in Canada, Cartoon Network in the United States as part of Sunday Pants, and S4C in Wales. In the United Kingdom, the series aired on CITV and for a short time on Cartoon Network in 2007. Reruns were later shown on Boomerang from 2009 to 2011 and Pop from 2012 to 2015.

=== DVD releases ===
The series came out first in Australia, in a pair of separate volumes.

StudioCanal released a 3-disc set of the series on DVD in the United Kingdom on 9 April 2012. It contains all 78 episodes from the entire TV series. In this release, two episodes, "Tails of Longing!" and "Dragon of Antagonism!", were both edited to remove scenes considered dangerous imitable behaviour easily copied by children (notably, Xan and Adi attempting to use a washing machine as a submersible in the former, and a glasses-less Xan catching a still-live firework before throwing it down in a panic after recognising it in the latter); these scenes are retained on the HuHa! YouTube channel. The original online episodes are not included.

=== YouTube ===
The original web episodes were uploaded on the official Adrenalini channel on YouTube, while an episode from the TV series would be uploaded on Mondays.

From its launch in November 2012, the television series moved to an adult animation YouTube channel called HuHa, with an episode being uploaded every Friday, until HuHa ceased uploading in early 2014. A French and German version of the channel also includes episodes from the series.

== See also ==
- Matt Hatter Chronicles
