= British Academy Children's Award for Pre-School Animation =

British Academy Children and Young People Award for Preschool Animation
- Awarded for: The best animated production for preschool audiences.
- Country: United Kingdom
- Presented by: British Academy of Film and Television Arts
- Currently held by: Hey Duggee (2022)
- Website: www.bafta.org/children

The British Academy Children and Young People Award for Preschool Animation is an award presented annually by the British Academy of Film and Television Arts (BAFTA). It is given to "animated content for children under six". Through the nineties, preschool animated productions were awarded alongside live-action series in a category named Preschool.

In 2000, two categories were created, one for each type of production (animation and live-action). The first recipient of the category was CITV's series Maisy. CBeebies' series Hey Duggee holds the record of most wins in the category with four, followed by Peppa Pig with three, and Charlie and Lola and Timmy Time with two each. Peppa Pig is the most nominated program in the category with eleven nominations, followed by Hey Duggee with six and Little Princess with four.

== Winners and nominees ==
=== 1990s ===
Pre-School

Year	Program	Recipient(s)	Broadcaster
1996 (1st)	Tots TV	Anne Wood, Vic Finch	CITV
1996 (1st)	Monster Café	Alison Stewart	CBBC
1996 (1st)	Playdays	Rosalind Farrimond	CBBC
1996 (1st)	Rala Rwdins	Rhys Ifans, Graham Pritchard	S4C
1997 (2nd)	Tots TV: "Lapland Out"	Anne Wood, Vic Finch	CITV
1997 (2nd)	Bwgan	Lona Llewelyn Davies, Delwyn Siôn	S4C
1997 (2nd)	Dear Mr. Barker	Jane Tarleton, Gillian Scothern	CBBC
1997 (2nd)	Rat-A-Tat-Tat: "Here Come the Aliens"	Roland Tongue, Susie Nott-Bower	Channel 4
1998 (3rd)	Teletubbies	Anne Wood	CBBC
1998 (3rd)	Animal Antics	Fiona Caldwell	Channel 5
1998 (3rd)	The Animal Shelf	Jackie Cockle, Ellen Meske	CITV
1998 (3rd)	Fun Song Factory	Iain Lauchlan, Will Brenton	CITV
1999 (4th)	Tecwyn Y Tractor	Lona Llewelyn Davies, Cliff Jones	S4C
1999 (4th)	The Animal Shelf	Jackie Cockle, Ellen Meske	CITV
1999 (4th)	Thomas the Tank Engine & Friends	Britt Allcroft, David Mitton	CITV
1999 (4th)	Bob the Builder	Jackie Cockle, Sarah Ball	CBeebies

=== 2000s ===
Preschool - Animation

Year	Program	Recipient(s)	Broadcaster
2000 (5th)	Maisy	Clive Juster, Leo Nielsen	CITV
2000 (5th)	64 Zoo Lane		CBeebies / France 5 / ZDF
2000 (5th)	Kipper	Ginger Gibbons, Mike Stuart	CITV
2000 (5th)	Hilltop Hospital	Robin Lyons, Pascal Le Nôtre	CITV / Canal J
2001 (6th)	Animal Stories	Christopher O'Hare, Tony Collingwood	CITV
2001 (6th)	Bob the Builder	Jackie Cockle, Sarah Ball, Kate Fawkes	CBeebies
2001 (6th)	Kipper	Ginger Gibbons, Mike Stuart	CITV
2001 (6th)	Hilltop Hospital	Robin Lyons, Pascal Le Nôtre	CITV / Canal J
2002 (7th)	Eddy and the Bear	Christopher O'Hare, Tony Collingwood	CITV
2002 (7th)	Andy Pandy	Jean Flynn, Tim Harper	CBeebies
2002 (7th)	Bob the Builder	Jackie Cockle, Sarah Ball	CBeebies
2002 (7th)	Sali Mali	Robin Lyons, Les Orton	S4C
2003 (8th)	Hilltop Hospital	Pascal Le Nôtre, Robin Lyons	CITV / Canal J
2003 (8th)	Tiny Planets	Richard Morss, Alistair McIlwain, Paul Michael	CITV
2003 (8th)	Yoko! Jakamoko! Toto!	Christopher O'Hare, Tony Collingwood, Andrea Tran	CITV
2003 (8th)	Boo!	Will Brenton, Iain Lauchlan, Mark Taylor	CBeebies
2004 (9th)	Yoko! Jakamoko! Toto!	Christopher O'Hare, Tony Collingwood, Andrea Tran	CITV
2004 (9th)	The Koala Brothers	David Johnson, Tobias Fouracre, Martin Pullen	CBeebies / ABC Kids
2004 (9th)	Peppa Pig	Phil Davies, Mark Baker, Neville Astley	Channel 5
2004 (9th)	Sam Tân	Robin Lyons, Timon Dowdeswell, Andrew Offiler	S4C
2005 (10th)	Peppa Pig	Phil Davies, Mark Baker, Neville Astley	Channel 5
2005 (10th)	The Koala Brothers	David Johnson, Martin Pullen	CBeebies / ABC Kids
2005 (10th)	Meg and Mog	Carl Gorham, Roger Mainwood	CITV
2005 (10th)	Pingu	Bella Reekie, Kevin Walton, Liz Whitaker	CBeebies
2006 (11th)	Pocoyo		CITV / La 2
2006 (11th)	Charlie and Lola	Claudia Lloyd, Kitty Taylor	Cbeebies
2006 (11th)	Postman Pat	Owen Balhatchet, Chris Taylor	Cbeebies
2006 (11th)	The Koala Brothers	David Johnson, Tobias Fouracre	CBeebies / ABC Kids
2007 (12th)	Charlie and Lola	Claudia Lloyd, Kitty Taylor	Cbeebies
2007 (12th)	Peppa Pig	Phil Davies, Mark Baker, Neville Astley	Channel 5
2007 (12th)	Little Princess	Iain Harvey, Edward Foster	Channel 5
2007 (12th)	Pocoyo		CITV / La 2
2008 (13th)	Charlie and Lola	Claudia Lloyd, Kitty Taylor	Cbeebies
2008 (13th)	Peppa Pig	Phil Davies, Mark Baker, Neville Astley	Channel 5
2008 (13th)	Little Princess	Iain Harvey, Edward Foster	Channel 5
2008 (13th)	Roary the Racing Car	Owen Ballhatchet, Tim Harper	Channel 5
2009 (14th)	Ben & Holly's Little Kingdom	Phil Davies, Neville Astley, Mark Baker	Channel 5
2009 (14th)	Humf	Joan Lofts, Leo Neilsen, Neil Fitzgibbon	Nick Jr.
2009 (14th)	Peppa Pig	Phil Davies, Mark Baker, Neville Astley	Channel 5
2009 (14th)	Little Princess: "A Merry Little Christmas"	Iain Harvey, Edward Foster	Channel 5

=== 2010s ===
Year	Program	Recipient(s)	Broadcaster
2010 (15th)	Timmy Time	Jackie Cockle, Sarah Fell, David Scanlon	Cbeebies
2010 (15th)	Ben & Holly's Little Kingdom	Phil Davies, Neville Astley, Mark Baker	Channel 5
2010 (15th)	Peppa Pig	Phil Davies, Mark Baker, Neville Astley	Channel 5
2010 (15th)	Jungle Junction	Erica Darby, Morgan Francis	Disney Channel
2011 (16th)	Peppa Pig	Phil Davies, Mark Baker, Neville Astley	Channel 5
2011 (16th)	Octonauts		CBeebies
2011 (16th)	Rastamouse	Greg Boardman, Derek Mogford, Eugenio Perez	CBeebies
2011 (16th)	Little Princess	Iain Harvey, Edward Foster	Channel 5
2012 (17th)	Peppa Pig	Phil Davies, Philip Hall, Joris van Hulzen	Channel 5
2012 (17th)	Rastamouse	Greg Boardman, Derek Mogford, Eugenio Perez	Cbeebies
2012 (17th)	Timmy Time	Jackie Cockle, Sarah Fell, David Scanlon	Cbeebies
2012 (17th)	Tree Fu Tom	Daniel Bays, Adam Shaw	Cbeebies
2013 (18th)	Timmy Time	Jackie Cockle, Liz Whitaker, David Scanlon	Cbeebies
2013 (18th)	Peppa Pig	Phil Davies, Philip Hall, Joris van Hulzen	Channel 5
2013 (18th)	Sarah & Duck	Sarah Gomes Harris, Tim O'Sullivan, Jamie Badminton	Cbeebies
2013 (18th)	Octonauts	Nicky Phelan, Stephanie Simpson, Kurt Mueller	Cbeebies
2014 (19th)	Sarah & Duck	Tim O'Sullivan, Sarah Gomes Harris, Jamie Badminton	Cbeebies
2014 (19th)	Bing	Mikael Shields, Nicky Phelan, Jeroen Jaspaert	CBeebies
2014 (19th)	Dinopaws		CBeebies
2014 (19th)	Postman Pat: "Postman Pat and the Rubber Duck Race"		CBeebies
2015 (20th)	The Clangers		Cbeebies
2015 (20th)	Hey Duggee	Grant Orchard, Sue Goffe, Janine Murphy	Cbeebies
2015 (20th)	Lily's Driftwood Bay		Nick Jr.
2015 (20th)	Peppa Pig	Phil Davies, Mark Baker, Neville Astley	Channel 5
2016 (21st)	Hey Duggee	Grant Orchard, Janine Voong, Sue Goffe	Cbeebies
2016 (21st)	The Clangers		CBeebies
2016 (21st)	Sarah & Duck		CBeebies
2016 (21st)	Go Jetters	Adam Redfern, Jo Allen, Tony Reed	CBeebies
2017 (22nd)	Hey Duggee	Grant Orchard, Janine Voong, Sander Jones	Cbeebies
2017 (22nd)	Peppa Pig	Phil Davies, Mark Baker, Joris van Hulzen	Channel 5
2017 (22nd)	Sarah & Duck	Sarah Gomes Harris, Tim O'Sullivan, Jamie Badminton	Cbeebies
2017 (22nd)	Digby Dragon	Adam Shaw, Chris Drew, Tom McDowell	Channel 5 / Nick Jr.
2018 (23rd)	Hey Duggee	Grant Orchard, Janine Voong, Sander Jones	Cbeebies
2018 (23rd)	Sarah & Duck	Sarah Gomes Harris, Tim O'Sullivan, Jamie Badminton	Cbeebies
2018 (23rd)	The Clangers		Cbeebies
2018 (23rd)	Octonauts		Cbeebies
2019 (24th)	Numberblocks	Joe Elliot, Simon Taylor, Ben Lee-Delisle	Cbeebies
2019 (24th)	Digby Dragon	Adam Shaw, Chris Drew, Jen Upton	Channel 5 / Nick Jr.
2019 (24th)	Hey Duggee	Grant Orchard, Janine Voong, Sander Jones	Cbeebies
2019 (24th)	Floogals	Ruther Ducker, Lee Walters, Ceri Barnes	Channel 5

=== 2020s ===
Year	Program	Recipient(s)	Broadcaster
2022 (25th)	Hey Duggee	Grant Orchard, Janine Voong, Sander Jones	Cbeebies
2022 (25th)	The Very Small Creatures	Lucy Izzard, Stephanie Owen	Sky Kids
2022 (25th)	Pip and Posy		Channel 5 / Sky Kids
2022 (25th)	Circle Square		Channel 5

- Note: The series that don't have recipients on the tables had Production team credited as recipients for the award or nomination.

== Multiple winners ==
Wins	Program
4	Hey Duggee
3	Peppa Pig
2	Charlie and Lola
2	Timmy Time

== Multiple nominations ==
Nominations	Program
11	Peppa Pig
6	Hey Duggee
4	Little Princess
5	Sarah & Duck
3	Hilltop Hospital
3	The Koala Brothers
3	Charlie and Lola
3	Timmy Time
3	Octonauts
3	The Clangers
2	Kipper
2	Bob the Builder
2	Yoko! Jakamoko! Toto!
2	Pocoyo
2	Postman Pat
2	Ben & Holly's Little Kingdom
2	Rastamouse
2	Digby Dragon
