= List of Hey Duggee episodes =

Episode list of an animated series

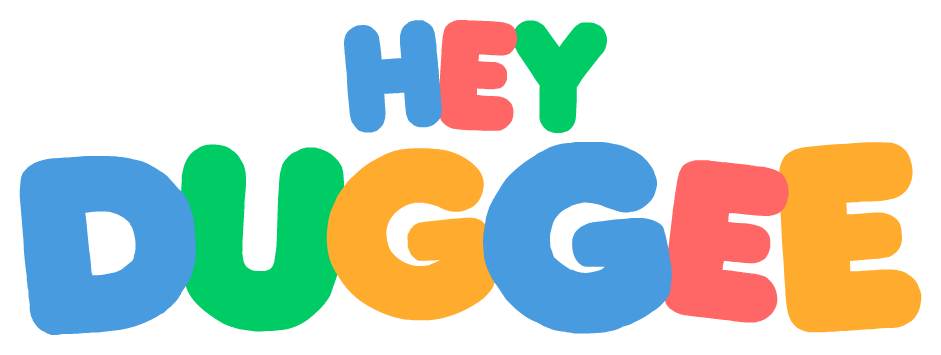

This is a list of episodes of the British animated children's series Hey Duggee.

== Series overview ==
Series	Episodes	Originally released	
Series	Episodes	First released	Last released
1	52	17 December 2014	2 November 2015
2	52	26 September 2016	10 July 2018
3	52	4 March 2019	17 September 2021
4	40	5 September 2022	29 September 2023
5	20	28 June 2024	26 September 2025

== Episodes ==
=== Pilot (2012) ===
Title	Original release date
"Chop Chop!"	12 March 2012

=== Series 1 (2014–15) ===
No. overall	No. in season	Title	Directed by	Written by	Original release date
1	1	"The Tinsel Badge"	Grant Orchard	Grant Orchard	17 December 2014
It's nearly Christmas, and Enid has run away, so Duggee and the squirrels go to find her. This episode was premiered in advance on 17 December 2014 as a Christmas special before the series' regular run.
2	2	"The Drawing Badge"	Grant Orchard	Grant Orchard	12 January 2015
Duggee and the Squirrels stay indoors because it is raining outside, and they decide to do some drawing.
3	3	"The Cake Badge"	Grant Orchard	Grant Orchard	13 January 2015
While playing outside, Happy comes across a cake in a field and eats it. The owners of the cake, who turn out to be rabbits, are not very pleased with that.
4	4	"The Hair Badge"	Grant Orchard	Myles McLeod	14 January 2015
The Squirrels try to help fix Duggee's hair.
5	5	"The Summer Holiday Badge"	Grant Orchard	Myles McLeod	15 January 2015
The Squirrels pack summer holiday (summer vacation) stuff for a bird named Mawk, who was migrating to "find summer" just with a photo camera around his neck and a toothbrush in a suitcase.
6	6	"The Rescue Badge"	Grant Orchard	Grant Orchard	16 January 2015
Duggee and the Squirrels rescue Enid the cat, who was stuck on a tree branch while chasing a mouse.
7	7	"The Super Squirrel Badge"	Grant Orchard	Grant Orchard	19 January 2015
Duggee and the Squirrels play superheroes, eventually helping a little duck to find its family.
8	8	"The Jam Badge"	Grant Orchard	Grant Orchard	20 January 2015
The Squirrels are watching Duggee making a jar of jam when a "naughty monkey" steals a barrel of fruit; the gang eventually share jam toasts with the monkey.
9	9	"The Treasure Hunt Badge"	Grant Orchard	Danny Stack	21 January 2015
The Squirrels, using a treasure map, go on an adventure to find a treasure to bring to Duggee. It turns out that the treasure was located near the Clubhouse.
10	10	"The Scarecrow Badge"	Grant Orchard	Danny Stack	22 January 2015
To stop some birds from eating Duggee's grain, the Squirrels decide to build a scarecrow. Betty, Happy, Norrie, and Tag help Duggee with the scarecrow, while Roly keeps a close eye on the birds, though it was tiring for him later on.
11	11	"The Funny Face Badge"	Grant Orchard	Grant Orchard	23 January 2015
Duggee and the Squirrels decide to try and cheer up their friend Whoooooo the Shamanistic Owl. When thinking for more ideas, Betty makes some funny faces, and the Squirrels decide to cheer up Whoooooo with more funny faces.
12	12	"The Bouncing Badge"	Grant Orchard	Grant Orchard	26 January 2015
Duggee puts up a bouncy castle for Tag on his birthday. But a thunder cloud was about to rain on the castle, so the Squirrels decide to blow it away.
13	13	"The Leaf Badge"	Grant Orchard	Danny Stack	27 January 2015
A weird noise is heard while Duggee and the Squirrels go for a walk in the woods while searching for a new leaf for Duggee.
14	14	"The Omelette Badge"	Grant Orchard	Danny Stack	28 January 2015
Duggee wants to make omelettes, but there are no eggs, so Duggee and the Squirrels need to find the chickens and get them to help.
15	15	"The Food Growing Badge"	Grant Orchard	Sam Morrison	29 January 2015
The Squirrels want to grow things after they see Duggee doing this as well. However, Happy doesn't think that his strawberry will grow at all.
16	16	"The Paddling Pool Badge"	Grant Orchard	James Henry	30 January 2015
On a hot day, Duggee gets out his big paddling pool. The Squirrels love paddling pools.
17	17	"The Paper Boat Badge"	Grant Orchard	Sam Morrison	2 February 2015
The Squirrels learn how to make a paper boat, and help some ants get to a picnic.
18	18	"The Castle Badge"	Grant Orchard	Myles McLeod	3 February 2015
Duggee and the Squirrels hear a spooky voice coming from a tower in a big castle.
19	19	"The Show & Tell Badge"	Grant Orchard	Grant Orchard	4 February 2015
The Squirrels watch Duggee 'Show and Tell' something interesting, and then they decide to find their own things for Show and Tell. Norrie found a Ladybird which was exciting.
20	20	"The Rocking Horse Badge"	Grant Orchard	Jo Clegg	5 February 2015
Duggee and the Squirrels fix Bucky, Duggee's old rocking horse, and then the Squirrels play with him.
21	21	"The Get Well Soon Badge"	Grant Orchard	Sander Jones	6 February 2015
Duggee and the Squirrels help other animals in trouble while the team heads to Norrie's house to give her a Get Well Soon card.
22	22	"The Hiccup Badge"	Grant Orchard	Grant Orchard	9 February 2015
The Squirrels' friend, Worm, has the hiccups, so the Squirrels need to cure him, and they turn to Duggee for some help.
23	23	"The Maze Badge"	Grant Orchard	Phillip Warner	10 February 2015
The Squirrels create a maze from items they find in Duggee's workshop. Their maze works too well when Duggee gets lost in it, so they must find him.
24	24	"The Acorn Badge"	Grant Orchard	Sam Morrison	12 February 2015 (normal) 11 February 2015 (unknown)
Duggee gets the Squirrels to gather acorns and give them to other animals, who are about to hibernate.
25	25	"The Balloon Badge"	Grant Orchard	Danny Stack	13 February 2015 (normal) 12 February 2015 (unknown)
Duggee shows off his balloon blowing skills to the Squirrels. They want the balloons, but Duggee tells them that they are for Tino the Artistic Mouse on his birthday.
26	26	"The Rain Dance Badge"	Grant Orchard	Danny Stack	11 February 2015 (normal) 13 February 2015 (unknown)
The Squirrels are taught a rain dance by Duggee in order to give his flowers water on a hot day.
27	27	"The Hide and Seek Badge"	Grant Orchard	Grant Orchard	8 June 2015
Duggee and the Squirrels play hide-and-seek. Duggee is the one seeking, and he manages to find all the Squirrels except Roly, though he was only seen sleeping.
28	28	"The Sheep Badge"	Grant Orchard	Phillip Warner	9 June 2015
Duggee and the Squirrels must get the 10 missing sheep back into their field after they appear in the Clubhouse.
29	29	"The Spider Badge"	Grant Orchard	Jo Clegg	10 June 2015
A spider is discovered in the dressing-up box by Norrie.
30	30	"The We Love Animals Badge"	Grant Orchard	Grant Orchard	11 June 2015
The Squirrels want to find strokable animals after they see Duggee stroking Enid the cat.
31	31	"The Snowman Badge"	Grant Orchard	Sam Morrison	12 June 2015
Duggee and the Squirrels build a snowman with a team of penguins.
32	32	"The Decorating Badge"	Grant Orchard	James Henry	15 June 2015
The Squirrels help Duggee to paint the Clubhouse. They all get some more help from Tino.
33	33	"The Tidy Up Badge"	Grant Orchard	Sam Morrison	16 June 2015
It's time to clean up the Clubhouse, and Duggee has bought a new vacuum cleaner. But when Roly presses the maximum speed button, the vacuum goes out of control, and Duggee and the Squirrels have to stop it before someone gets sucked.
34	34	"The Circus Badge"	Grant Orchard	Grant Orchard	17 June 2015
Duggee and the Squirrels are excited by the arrival of the circus, but not when they find out it's a flea circus.
35	35	"The Egg Badge"	Grant Orchard	Grant Orchard	18 June 2015
It's time for Chicken to lay her egg. She does, but when the egg runs away, the Squirrels must find it and give it back to Chicken.
36	36	"The Puppy Badge"	Grant Orchard	Jo Clegg	19 June 2015
Duggly, Duggee's baby nephew, stays over at the Clubhouse. Unfortunately, he is a bit rambunctious. When Duggly tries to walk outside, he trips over and bursts into tears, crying hysterically. Everyone tries to cheer him up, but nothing works until Frog comes, Duggly loves Frog. He however, cries again after the children of Squirrel Club leave and make Enid awake, but he sleeps next to Frog while the credits roll. The original plot of this episode was Duggee and the Squirrels adopt the puppies at the Clubhouse, however, this episode was totally rewritten. Originally, this episode would be call "The Baby Badge".
37	37	"The Cardboard Box Badge"	Grant Orchard	James Henry	22 June 2015
Duggee and the Squirrels have fun with an old cardboard box that Duggee ordered.
38	38	"The Caterpillar Badge"	Grant Orchard	James Henry	23 June 2015
Tag befriends a very hungry caterpillar, and soon he decides to show the caterpillar to his friends. The caterpillar later turns into a butterfly.
39	39	"The Sandcastle Badge"	Grant Orchard	Myles McLeod	24 June 2015
Mr. Crab and his partner, Nigel, need help from Duggee and the Squirrels to build them a new home. The Squirrels manage to do this with their knowledge on building sandcastles.
40	40	"The Football Badge"	Grant Orchard	Grant Orchard	25 June 2015
Innocent of the rules of association football, the Squirrels still want to play the game with Duggee. The same badge was given in "The Kick Song", a football remix of The Stick Song.
41	41	"The Puppet Show Badge"	Grant Orchard	Grant Orchard	26 June 2015
Duggee and the Squirrels want to show everyone their latest adventure by performing a puppet show.
42	42	"The Birdwatching Badge"	Grant Orchard	Grant Orchard	19 October 2015
What better way to observe birds than using Duggee's binoculars? Duggee and the Squirrels look for more birds, but their bird sightings keep getting constantly, and unsurprisingly, spoiled by Roly.
43	43	"The Big Parade Badge"	Grant Orchard	Jo Clegg	20 October 2015
After Eugene, the leader of the Big Parade, hurts his leg, Duggee and the Squirrels lend a hand (or paw).
44	44	"The Be Careful Badge"	Grant Orchard	Danny Stack	21 October 2015
Duggee and the Squirrels rescue Naughty Monkey after he falls into a hole and cries sadly.
45	45	"The First Aid Badge"	Grant Orchard	Grant Orchard	22 October 2015
Duggee and the Squirrels give first aid to Tag after he hurts his knee, or to Duggee after he cuts (or scratches) his finger.
46	46	"The Bubble Badge"	Grant Orchard	Sam Morrison	23 October 2015
Happy has trouble blowing bubbles with Duggee and the rest of the Squirrels.
47	47	"The Submarine Badge"	Grant Orchard	Grant Orchard	26 October 2015
It's a day out for Duggee and the Squirrels as they go on an underwater adventure with Betty's dad in his submarine.
48	48	"The Detective Badge"	Grant Orchard	Phillip Warner	27 October 2015
Duggee puts his homemade apple pie on the windowsill to cool down, but then it disappears. Who took it? Can the Squirrels find out? They'll have to be good detectives in order to solve this mystery. The whole episode is a reference to the famous detective Sherlock Holmes.
49	49	"The Sewing Badge"	Grant Orchard	Grant Orchard	28 October 2015
Duggee and the Squirrels are sewing ponchos when they hear a loud noise. They must investigate and find out what the noise is. It's a large polar bear sneezing! The original plot of this episode was Duggee and the Squirrels making their ponchos and also make ponchos to the all animals, however, the episode was rewritten. The plot of this episode about sneezing polar bear was from a scrapped episode called "The Sneezing Badge". The Squirrels reaction to getting the badge was different to most other episodes; they usually cheer "Yay!" , but in this episode, they instead dance to panpipe music.
50	50	"The Surprise Badge"	Grant Orchard	Sam Morrison	29 October 2015
Duggee and the Squirrels have bought Hennie a present for her birthday. But before they surprise her, they need to wrap it up. But one wrapping paper starts to go into one character to the next until it goes back to Roly. Will Hennie like the present? It has to be really big, because Hennie is really big.
51	51	"The Teddy Bear Badge"	Grant Orchard	Jo Clegg	30 October 2015
Duggee and the Squirrels take their teddy bears on a picnic, where they meet a real bear called Beryl, who wants a teddy too, so she can join in.
52	52	"The Story Badge"	Grant Orchard	Grant Orchard	2 November 2015
The Squirrels tire themselves out with all their activities, so Duggee suggests they take a break and listen to a story.

=== Series 2 (2016–18) ===
Dexter Varrall replaces Leo Templer in the role of Roly's voice.

No. overall	No. in season	Title	Directed by	Written by	Original release date
53	1	"The Making Music Badge"	Grant Orchard	Jenny Landreth	26 September 2016
When the Squirrels find Duggee playing a huge saxophone, they want to have a go too, but it is too big.
54	2	"The Whistling Badge"	Grant Orchard	Sam Morrison	27 September 2016
Little Egg disturbs all the animals, so the Squirrels want to learn how to whistle to round up them.
55	3	"The Shape Badge"	Grant Orchard	Danny Stack	28 September 2016
The Squirrels play a shape matching game but it might rain so they decide to go inside. Norrie is worried about the animals getting wet so they try and find places to keep them dry. This episode isn't that appropriate for toddlers due to when it rains and Roly stays outside, and when he screams in a low voice "Noooooo!!", as it may be too scary for toddlers and/or may set a bad example for them.
56	4	"The Juice Badge"	Grant Orchard	Jo Clegg	29 September 2016
Duggee makes the Squirrels juice from fresh fruit in the garden where they meet Buggee, a little bug, who strongly dislikes being so small. It is unknown why Buggee cried with a frown after saying it’s the best day of her life. Possibly an oversight.
57	5	"The Footprint Badge"	Grant Orchard	Ian Skelton	30 September 2016
The Squirrels are playing hide and seek but they can't find Happy. Duggee can though – he follows Happy's footprints. At the end of the episode they meet Katarina the crybaby Flamingo to watch a synchronised swimming show.
58	6	"The Fossil Badge"	Grant Orchard	Phillip Warner	3 October 2016
The Squirrels are digging in the garden when they find a fossil, so Duggee and the Narrator explain all about fossils and prehistoric times.
59	7	"The Treehouse Badge"	Grant Orchard	James Henry	4 October 2016
Duggee is cleaning the clubhouse so the Squirrels take refuge in the treehouse, but it's getting a little bit cramped these days.
60	8	"The Kite Badge"	Grant Orchard	James Henry	5 October 2016
It's a windy day and the Squirrels want to play outside. Duggee is flying his kite. The Squirrels make their own kites. Hennie the ostrich sees their kites, and gets scared of them, thinking they were terrible flying "beasties" (monsters). The second time Hennie sees the Squirrels, they remind her the "beasties" (monsters) are just their kites, and show Hennie they made one for her that's just her perfect size. Hennie overcomes her strange fear and realises there were no monsters or "terrible beasties" at all - they were just the Squirrels' kites.
61	9	"The Tadpole Badge"	Grant Orchard	Jo Clegg	6 October 2016
Duggee has made a rock pool, a place of calm for all the animals. The Squirrels spot the strangest things – wriggling dots with tails. This episode is all about the life cycle of a tadpole.
62	10	"The Honey Badge"	Grant Orchard	Ian Skelton	7 October 2016
Duggee's made some delicious pancakes, but the clubhouse is out of honey. Time for the bees to get busy!
63	11	"The Pottery Badge"	Grant Orchard	Sam Morrison	10 October 2016
Duggee is having a cup of tea in his favourite cup when Roly surprises him with a very loud "boo!" It is so loud that Duggee jumps and drops his cup which shatters into pieces. Time for a bit of pottery, with help of the Japanese pottery poodle Hatsu Kimara. She greets the Squirrels Club children with "Konnichiwa", and then she later speaks even more Japanese, which the Squirrel Club children don't understand. Hatsu's personality was not what anyone expected.
64	12	"The Teamwork Badge"	Grant Orchard	Danny Stack	11 October 2016
A big box of bits and pieces is delivered to the Clubhouse and the Squirrels are very excited. Duggee and the Squirrels will have to work very hard to put it all together, so it's time for a bit of teamwork.
65	13	"The Dancing Bug Badge"	Grant Orchard	Phillip Warner	12 October 2016
When a dancing bug lands on Duggee's head, he can't stop dancing. The Squirrels see that it's a tiny hillbilly bug named Billy, who has a band called "Billy And The Sillies", whose members all have rhyming names with Billy's name: Dilly, Hilly, Gilly and Milly. Note: Last Voice that Roly's Voice by Leo Templer as he died.
66	14	"The Train Badge"	Grant Orchard	James Henry	12 June 2017
Duggee is playing with his train set. Choo-choo! It's amazing! The Squirrels are curious and want to know all about it. Duggee explains that it is a toy but it works exactly like a real train. Hennie arrives and she has a train too. The Squirrels ask if they can play with it. Hennie points out that "you can't play with it; you can play in it." All aboard! Note: First Voice that Roly's Voice by Dexter Varrall.
67	15	"The Pizza Badge"	Grant Orchard	Phillip Warner	13 June 2017
The Squirrels help Duggee try out his new outdoor pizza oven. Duggee makes the bases, then the Squirrels each put on all the toppings they like best. Some of their combinations are interesting.
68	16	"The Medicine Badge"	Grant Orchard	Jo Clegg	14 June 2017
Duggee loses his voice. The Squirrels want to make him feel better. Duggee tries to tell them that he needs some water, but the Squirrels don't quite understand, so they ask all the other animals for advice. Does anyone have the answer? Happy does while telling a story when he mentioned water!
69	17	"The Camping Badge"	Grant Orchard	Jenny Landreth	15 June 2017
Duggee and the Squirrels are going camping and they need to find somewhere to pitch their tent. Unfortunately, it's not as easy as they thought it would be. They all work together and finally get settled. But Tag realises he can't sleep without his teddy, and Happy would like a glass of water. Suddenly Duggee is up and down and in and out of the tent getting everything the Squirrels need. In fact, Duggee works so hard that he's the first to fall asleep.
70	18	"The Making Friends Badge"	Grant Orchard	Jo Clegg	16 June 2017
The Squirrels are off for a jamboree to make some new friends, play games and have a picnic. They meet another group of animals who are years older than the squirrels, with their very own version of Duggee, but everything they do is different – even Roly finds one of them (Ottie) too loud!
71	19	"The River Badge"	Grant Orchard	Sander Jones	19 June 2017
Duggee has a package that needs delivering right to the other end of the river, a long way from the Clubhouse. It looks like the Squirrels are going to have a day out on the boat. Good thing Duggee has his badge. All that Roly needs to do is to avoid the ship's horn!
72	20	"The Yoga Badge"	Grant Orchard	Jo Clegg	20 June 2017
It's one of those days where you have too much energy after a really, really good sleep. The Squirrels have arrived and they're all hyped up with bundles of energy. Things are starting to get a bit frantic and Duggee needs to calm them all down. Fortunately, he has his Yoga badge. This episode ended with Duggee floating for some reason.
73	21	"The Collecting Badge"	Grant Orchard	Ian Skelton	21 June 2017
Duggee is cleaning his biscuit tin collection, one of the many things he collects. The Squirrels are inspired to start their own collections. They busy themselves doing the collecting bit, and then display their precious things in the Clubhouse. The Squirrels have made many great collections, but Tag has the best one of them all: things that make him happy. Roly mistakes a mountain for a rock.
74	22	"The Shadow Badge"	Grant Orchard	Jenny Landreth	22 June 2017 (UK); 27 October 2017 (USA)
The sun is setting, and the Squirrels are sitting on the sofa. They've had a very busy day. Suddenly, all the lights go out! Oh dear, there's been a power cut (or a power outage). The Squirrels can't see anything. Thank goodness Duggee has got his torch (flashlight), and he has torches (flashlights) for everyone. Excluding the songs and 'Special Badges', this is the only regular episode where the intro doesn't say "Isn't it time for…".
75	23	"The Theatre Badge"	Grant Orchard	Danny Stack	23 June 2017
Tino and Eugene are having a disagreement about an amateur dramatic show they want to put on. One wants an all-singing, all-dancing extravaganza, while the other wants a serious drama. Can Duggee and the Squirrels help them get something ready to perform?
76	24	"The Memory Badge"	Grant Orchard	James Henry	26 June 2017
Happy discovers his wobbly tooth has come out, but he's lost it, which makes him talk funny with a lisp (Examples: "Yeth" instead of "Yes", 'tho' instead of 'so', etc.) Duggee and the Squirrels help Happy retrace his steps of where he last had the tooth. The narrator hilariously forgets Duggee's name in the end.
77	25	"The Going Slow Badge"	Grant Orchard	Danny Stack	27 June 2017
The Squirrels are rushing around, so Duggee shows them how to take a slower pace. There is a sort of 'plot twist' when the tortoise goes fast, and then he needs to go slow again after he gets to the hospital.
78	26	"The Obstacle Course Badge"	Grant Orchard	James Henry	28 June 2017
Duggee and the Squirrels compete in the annual Animal Obstacle Course Race.
79	27	"The Spooky Badge"	Grant Orchard	Myles McLeod	28 October 2017
Duggee and the Squirrels try to find out what's making spooky footprints all over the place. They track what seems to be a ghost...then discover it's actually only a sheep with a sheet over it. But it makes them very confused, because how did a sheep fly in the air, and how does it "boo" when it should "baa"? Norrie explains the answer, remembering everything that happened earlier. The sheep went "boo" because it had eaten Duggee's missing sock. The whole episode is a reference to Scooby-Doo, as the Squirrels are dressed up as the characters, featured the unmasking scene, and getting chased by the ghost.
80	28	"The Space Badge"	Grant Orchard	Sam Morrison	4 December 2017
The Squirrels take a pretend ride through space after looking through Duggee's telescope. They discover many things including that there are no playgrounds, bouncy castles, treehouses or paddling pools (wading pools) in space. Roly is especially unhappy that there are no toilets in space. It is revealed that Roly can hold in his urine (aka pee) for a long time.
81	29	"The Harvest Badge"	Grant Orchard	Danny Stack	5 December 2017
The Squirrels help Duggee out with a big harvest. Then, when Duggee's tractor breaks down, the Squirrels find help from all the other animals.
82	30	"The Colour Badge"	Grant Orchard	Danny Stack	6 December 2017
The Squirrels help out Duggee with his colouring book. But Duggee only has six coloured paints, which means that everyone will have to mix colours together to get secondary colours like orange, cyan and purple, or "Blammo", "Lemonberry", and "Fizzysip", as the Squirrels name them.
83	31	"The Stick Badge"	Grant Orchard	Sander Jones and Diggy Hicks-Little	7 December 2017
The Squirrels help with collected wood for a campfire, but their first efforts are wood which is still useful (a spoon, a cane, a door, a tennis racket and some washing pegs). While looking for some twigs that have fallen on the ground, Roly finds a stick that looks suspiciously like an insect. The stick insect performs a Euro-pop song for them too (known as “The Stick Song”), which went viral on YouTube.
84	32	"The Voice Badge"	Grant Orchard	Phillip Warner	8 December 2017
When the Squirrels start talking to each other in the wrong voices, it's clear something has gone awry. All the animals switch voices too. They all get their voices back before the badge is given. However, before the credits, the narrator's voice hilariously changes to a female voice. There is a continuity error where on the title card and when Duggee points at the badge, the badge's mouth is open, but when Duggee gives it to the Squirrels, the mouth is now closed.
85	33	"The Island Badge"	Grant Orchard	Sam Morrison	11 December 2017
Duggee and the Squirrels are doing a bit of sailing, but when they stop at an island for lunch, they find their food is missing because a crab took the ship! Meanwhile, Betty writes in a book while telling us what happened during the island adventure.
86	34	"The Sleeping Badge"	Grant Orchard	Ian Skelton	12 December 2017
Tag can't sleep, so Duggee tells him a few tricks that many different animals use to get to sleep.
87	35	"The Brave Banana Badge"	Grant Orchard	Ian Skelton	13 December 2017
It's a stormy day, and the Squirrels are scared of all the thunder and lightning. Well, all of them except Roly, at first. Fortunately, Duggee knows how to help the Squirrels overcome their fears. They just need to go to their happy places, just like Duggee did when he himself was scared. The name of this episode does not actually mean being a physical banana. It actually may refer to the name of the company or club that gave Duggee his "Brave Banana Badge", as it may be "Brave Bananas".
88	36	"The Water Badge"	Grant Orchard	Jenny Landreth	14 December 2017
Happy lets a tap drip, wasting water. The Squirrels think water is limitless, and they explain where they think it comes from by using a water cycle.
89	37	"The Traffic Badge"	Grant Orchard	Sander Jones	15 December 2017
Duggee is taking the Squirrels to the tropical lake, but many other animals have had the same idea. To make things worse, this leads to a traffic jam.
90	38	"The Dressing Up Badge"	Grant Orchard	Sam Morrison	1 January 2018
It's Enid's birthday. She doesn't like surprises or cakes, so Duggee and the Squirrels decide to throw her a dressing up party. But how can they do that? They soon realise Enid likes cat food instead of cake, and she also likes dressing up, so the Squirrels dress up. Betty's plumber costume looks like Mario. On Twitter, this episode became controversial because Roly said "fireman". The London Fire Brigade (LFB) in Greenwich, complained about it, because Roly could have said "fire fighter" instead, and fire fighters can be female or male.
91	39	"The Getting On Badge"	Grant Orchard	Phillip Warner	1 January 2018
Fox, Badger, Mole, Vole and Worm are not getting on (getting along). Can Duggee and the Squirrels suggest ways that they can all live peacefully? This episode contains two rare scenes rendered in 3-D.
92	40	"The Wedding Badge"	Grant Orchard	Ian Skelton	19 May 2018
There is another royal wedding taking place between King Tiger and Chew Chew. All guests are required to bring fruit and wear hats (although Roly just puts a bucket on his head). The Squirrels help to create a new ensemble for Chew Chew when she gets trapped in a bush and rips her wedding dress. Duggee catches the bouquet.....
93	41	"The Grandparents Badge"	Grant Orchard	James Henry	25 June 2018
Today, it's "Bring Your Grandparents to Squirrel Club" Day, but the ship Norrie and her gran made destroys to bits. Can the grandparents think their brains to fix it? It is revealed that Tag's grandma is Spanish.
94	42	"The Organising Badge"	Grant Orchard	Ian Skelton	26 June 2018
Duggee and the Squirrels reorganise everything in the clubhouse, and outside too. Unfortunately, Roly ruins most of it.
95	43	"The Looking After Badge"	Grant Orchard	Sander Jones	27 June 2018
There's a hot air balloon outside the Clubhouse. Someone is going on an adventure!
96	44	"The Comedy Badge"	Grant Orchard	Danny Stack	28 June 2018
When Tag hurts his knee (again), the Squirrels decide laughter is the best medicine, according to Happy's mum. But none of their plans to make Tag laugh seem to work, until Duggee helps by doing something completely unexpected.
97	45	"The Singing Badge"	Grant Orchard	Sam Morrison	29 June 2018
Duggee and the Squirrels go on a long, tiring walk through the countryside when they meet Mrs. Weaver to sing and go home soon.
98	46	"The Playing Badge"	Grant Orchard	Phillip Warner	2 July 2018
Naughty Monkey's four cousins come to visit him. But they turn out to be even naughtier than Naughty Monkey himself. Duggee, the Squirrels and the narrator teach the cousins how to play calmly.
99	47	"The Party Badge"	Grant Orchard	Jo Clegg	3 July 2018
There's a parcel for Duggee, but why is it wrapped up like a present? The Squirrels think it's his birthday, and makes him a surprise party. But they soon realise it's not Duggee's birthday after all.
100	48	"The Tour Guide Badge"	Grant Orchard	Sam Morrison	4 July 2018
Gerbie the German snake is on holiday (vacation) and would like to see all the beautiful sights.
101	49	"The Sailing Badge"	Grant Orchard	Sam Morrison	5 July 2018
A giant, regal sailing ship runs aground on the beach, so the Squirrels go to investigate.
102	50	"The Key Badge"	Grant Orchard	Phillip Warner	6 July 2018
The Squirrels are playing with their toys again, and they were bored, except for Roly. However, he digs up a key in the garden, but what does it do? It helps people with many things. So, the Squirrels test the key by playing a game of trial and error and then get four more keys. The last key is red used for a statue that looks similar to Duggee. Tag winds the key and...finds a hallway full of toys!
103	51	"The Fashion Badge"	Grant Orchard	Jenny Landreth	9 July 2018
Duggee's uniform is getting old and worn out. It's time he made himself a new outfit.
104	52	"The Glasses Badge"	Grant Orchard	Sander Jones	10 July 2018 (UK); 6 May 2020 (USA)
Mole is sad that he couldn't pursue his childhood dream (a show-figure Mole) because his vision is too fuzzy. This episode features a short scene of a real life Duggee, also known as Zeylo.

=== Series 3 (2019–21) ===
This series aired episodes every day at 12:00pm on the CBeebies channel instead of on the morning block. It was the first to feature new voice actors included in the episode particle. There was also a new animation in the theme song.

No. overall	No. in season	Title	Directed by	Written by	Original release date
105	1	"The Being Quiet Badge"	Grant Orchard	Jo Clegg	4 March 2019 (UK); 2 April 2020 (USA)
Duggee and the Squirrels go on an adventure to find a famous shy creature called The Snard.
106	2	"The Duck Badge"	Grant Orchard	Julia Kent	5 March 2019 (UK); 26 March 2020 (USA)
The clubhouse is suddenly inhabited with 100 baby ducklings who think that Norrie is their mum.
107	3	"The Tooth Brushing Badge"	Grant Orchard	Sam Morrison	6 March 2019
Duggee and the Squirrels meet a French lion named Alain L'Odeur, who has unfortunate bad breath because he didn't brush his teeth.
108	4	"The Camouflage Badge"	Grant Orchard	Sam Morrison	7 March 2019
The Squirrels meet a chameleon named Cosey and learn all about blending into surroundings.
109	5	"The Get Indoors Badge"	Grant Orchard	James Henry	8 March 2019
A weather forecast warning from Duggee's barometer leads the Squirrels to round up all the animals.
110	6	"The Day Off Badge"	Grant Orchard	Phillip Warner	11 March 2019
It's Duggee's day off from school, but the Squirrels show up at his clubhouse anyway to tell him all about their great adventures. This is the only episode to start with someone who isn't a member of Squirrel Club.
111	7	"The Pen Pal Badge"	Grant Orchard	Jo Clegg	12 March 2019
Duggee arranges for the Squirrels to write to some pen pals: Nancy the seal (Norrie's pen pal), Florian the German lynx (Roly's pen pal, who has a German accent), Margot the otter (Happy's pen pal), Avi the shrew (Tag's pen pal), and Abedayo the calm okapi (Betty's pen pal). Happy is disappointed to hear that Margot dislikes water. Margot's dislike of water is very ironic and weird, since she's an otter. Abedayo is possibly Indian due to his love of yoga and calm personality, and that he was meditating while talking to Betty.
112	8	"The Big Day Out Badge"	Grant Orchard	James Henry	13 March 2019
This episode is an adaptation of the Hey Duggee Live show from the CBeebies Land theme park at Alton Towers Resort: Duggee takes the Squirrels and their parents (except for Roly's dad, since Roly took his grandpa) on an exciting mystery trip. But the trip Duggee picked wasn't exciting at first, until they enjoyed it.
113	9	"The Tree Badge"	Grant Orchard	Jenny Landreth	14 March 2019
Duggee helps the Squirrels learn about the many wonderful things that trees can do for the various creatures around them.
114	10	"The Cheese Badge"	Grant Orchard	James Walsh	15 March 2019
Duggee and the Squirrels go on an epic mission to contain an outbreak.
115	11	"The Radio Badge"	Grant Orchard	Phillip Warner	11 November 2019
The Squirrels find some of Duggee's old radio equipment and decide to start their own radio program called 'Squirrel Radio'.
116	12	"The Opposites Badge"	Grant Orchard	Julia Ken	11 November 2019
The Squirrels learn about what opposites are with the help of some topsy turvy animal friends.
117	13	"The Breakfast Badge"	Grant Orchard	Jenny Landreth	12 November 2019
Tag is feeling grumpy this morning because he didn't eat his breakfast, but Duggee fortunately knows how to help him out.
118	14	"The Family Photo Badge"	Grant Orchard	Jo Clegg	13 November 2019
The Squirrels learn that friends can be like family and decide to take a brilliant group photo together!
119	15	"The Future Badge"	Grant Orchard	James Henry	14 November 2019
The Squirrels are taken to the future by Duggee using a time machine which involves looking at what the future has to offer such as meeting a robot replica of Duggee and other strange sights. This is the only episode to have two intros and two title cards, although the second title card was a futuristic version and had false credits, saying the episode was directed by 'Grant Drawbot Orchard', and written by 'James Thx6000 Henry'. (The first title card had the creators' real names.) 'Thx' is an internet slang for 'thanks', and it is commonly used in text messaging.
120	16	"The Philosophy Badge"	Grant Orchard	Sam Morrison	15 November 2019
Tino the Artistic Mouse inspires Duggee and the Squirrels to think about daily life's most biggest and toughest questions that have never been answered before or since.
121	17	"The Sharing Badge"	Grant Orchard	Evgenia Golubeva	18 November 2019
Duggee and the Squirrels bake a pie and learn how to share by dividing things equally.
122	18	"The History Badge"	Grant Orchard	Jo Clegg	19 November 2019
The Squirrels get a special history lesson from Duggee and some faces from the past.
123	19	"The Art Badge"	Grant Orchard	Sophie Dutton	20 November 2019
The Squirrels learn about art while making pieces for Tino's Woodland Biennale.
124	20	"The Crazy Golf Badge"	Grant Orchard	Phillip Warner	21 November 2019
Duggee and the Squirrels practice their golf in pursuit of a round of milkshakes.
125	21	"The Mystery Badge"	Grant Orchard	James Walsh	22 November 2019
The Squirrels go to a fancy party at King Tiger's house and become embroiled in a mystery.
126	22	"The Election Badge"	Grant Orchard	Sam Morrison	12 December 2019
Eugene is retiring from running as leader of the annual summer fair and he needs somebody else to take over and replace him. Duggee and the Squirrels suggest they hold an election to make things fair. But the election ends up to be a tie!
127	23	"The Mixtape Badge"	Grant Orchard	Sander Jones	15 June 2020
The Squirrels are exploring in the attic when they find an old cassette tape.They decide to make a mixtape compilation video for Duggee to show and remind him of about all of the happy memories that they have made over the past six years and all the fun times they had while earning their badges.
128	24	"The Taste Badge"	Grant Orchard	Julia Kent	16 June 2020
Duggee is busy making a smoothie and the Squirrels cannot agree or decide on whether the smoothies are delicious and tasty or horrible and disgusting. So they decide to make their own adventurous smoothies showcasing their favourite flavours to discover what the sense of taste is.
129	25	"The Biology Badge"	Grant Orchard	James Walsh	17 June 2020
Duggee and the Squirrels take a hop onto the Biology Bus and miniaturize themselves in order for them to go on an epic voyage of discovery inside of Enid the Cat to find out what is making her cough.
130	26	"The Puddle Badge"	Grant Orchard	Phillip Warner	18 June 2020
Happy sees a very questionable-looking puddle that he is determined to splash in, much to the horror of Duggee, the other Squirrels and the tiny citizens of Midgetropolis who live inside it.
131	27	"The Game Show Badge"	Grant Orchard	Sander Jones	22 June 2020
The Squirrels have finished playing all of their board games. So Duggee entertains them by putting on a game show with some help hosting from his good friend Ladybug. Can the Squirrels win with the help of Roly?
132	28	"The Round Up Badge"	Grant Orchard	Felix Massie	23 June 2020
Duggee and the Squirrels are on the trails of a lost herd of cattle cows with the support of Duggee and his old western pal Rodeo Horse, who teaches them how to be cowboys and cowgirls.
133	29	"The Favourite Badge"	Grant Orchard	Jo Clegg	24 June 2020
The Squirrels learn what a favourite is, but have trouble deciding what their own favourite things are, so they make a film asking some of their friends what is special to them to help narrow it down.
134	30	"The Topiary Badge"	Grant Orchard	Julia Kent	25 June 2020
When the Squirrels see Duggee practising his amazing and impressive topiary skills and they are keen to try some of their own and promptly put all of their new talents into practice in order for them to tame some very wild woods.
135	31	"The A Cappella Badge"	Grant Orchard	Sophie Dutton	26 June 2020
The Squirrels are inspired to learn about how to sing a cappella style, a type of music genre which means performing songs together only using voices and sounds made with their mouths with no instruments like guitars, piano or drums involved. They are inspired to do this after they have just finished listening to a famous bird barbershop quartet singing in a nearby tree above them.
136	32	"The Christmas Badge"	Grant Orchard	Jenny Landreth	7 December 2020 (UK); 24 December 2020 (USA)
During the holiday season, the Squirrels try to inspire Duggee's friend Clarence who has unfortunately lost and forgotten about his Christmas cheer.
137	33	"The Babysitting Badge"	Grant Orchard	Jo Clegg	29 March 2021 (UK); 9 July 2021 (USA)
Duggee has a job to do outside of the Clubhouse, but who will look after the Squirrels? King Tiger of course, since he has his Babysitting Badge! But it's actually the Squirrels who end up babysitting King Tiger.
138	34	"The Comic Badge"	Grant Orchard	Jess Jackson	30 March 2021 (UK); 16 July 2021 (USA)
Duggee reads the Squirrels one of his favourite comics and they help with ending it, as they read the only issue of Detective Puppy. Detective Puppy is a spoof of T.U.F.F. Puppy, another Nickelodeon show. However, this show isn't produced by Nickelodeon. It aired on the Nick Jr. Channel until 2022.
139	35	"The Senses Badge"	Grant Orchard	Sophie Dutton	31 March 2021 (UK); 16 July 2021 (USA)
Roly loses his best potato, but Duggee finds it using his sense of smell as the Squirrels learn about the Five Senses.
140	36	"The Diplomacy Badge"	Grant Orchard	Jo Clegg	1 April 2021 (UK); 23 July 2021 (USA)
Betty and Sergeant Ant just want perfection, but no one seems to be listening as the Squirrels do a lesson on speaking more sensible.
141	37	"The Buddy Badge"	Grant Orchard	Jo Clegg	2 April 2021 (UK); 23 July 2021 (USA)
Duggee hosts a Buddy Bonanza for Mrs Weaver and the Squirrels, with the aim of finding new buddies with common interests to them.
142	38	"The Bridge Badge"	Grant Orchard	James Walsh	2 April 2021 (UK); 30 July 2021 (USA)
The Squirrels help a quarreling group of Gerbils sort out their longstanding disagreement.
143	39	"The Soap Opera Badge"	Grant Orchard	Diggy Hicks-Little	4 September 2021 (UK); 15 October 2021 (USA)
After accidentally breaking the Chickens' TV aerial, the Squirrels recreate the final episode of their favourite soap opera.
144	40	"The Mythical Creature Badge"	Grant Orchard	Phillip Warner	5 September 2021 (UK); 15 October 2021 (USA)
The Squirrels find a book about mythical creatures, which won't open. Duggee shows the Squirrels that it opens of you have your Mythical Creature Badge. The book then inspires the Squirrels to find one themselves.
145	41	"The Counting Badge"	Grant Orchard	James Walsh	6 September 2021 (UK); 15 October 2021 (USA)
The Squirrels try to attempt to completing the ultimate achievement challenge of counting up to 100. But when they reach 77, they start feeling too tired to continue. But the animals cheer them up by believing in the Squirrels for 78 and onwards.
146	42	"The What Happened Badge"	Grant Orchard	Sander Jones	7 September 2021 (UK); 22 October 2021 (USA)
There's some strange communication glitches going on around the clubhouse and the Squirrels attempt to tell us the scenarios of what just happened. In one part, Tag goes a bit too far back, remembering when he was a cute baby who could walk.
147	43	"The Telling Time Badge"	Grant Orchard	Sam Morrison	8 September 2021 (UK); 22 October 2021 (USA)
John the Crab teaches the Squirrels about telling time and time zones on an analog and digital clock in order to plan a surprise party for his silent husband Nigel.
148	44	"The Puzzle Badge"	Grant Orchard	Sophie Dutton	9 September 2021 (UK); 22 October 2021 (USA)
The Squirrels are so close to finishing a jigsaw puzzle, but the last piece was taken by three mice, so the Squirrels try and get the piece with a lot of jigsaw solving.
149	45	"The Action Hero Badge"	Grant Orchard	Sam Morrison	10 September 2021 (UK); 29 October 2021 (USA)
The Squirrels are playing with their Toys. Roly has a model of action hero Jet Rocket. They discuss his adventures and how new skills such as being in touch with his emotions and being good at maths could help him save the world. Features the voice of David Mitchell (comedian). Jet Rockett spears to be based on Arnold Schwarzenegger.
150	46	"The Training Badge"	Grant Orchard	Phillip Warner	11 September 2021 (UK); 29 October 2021 (USA)
Duggee struggles to organise the Squirrels in order of height and keeping them focused on the task. Sounds like the Squirrels need some training to improve their concentration. There is a notable typing error in this episode's end credits. Duffy is misspelled as Dufy.
151	47	"The Reunion Badge"	Grant Orchard	Julia Kent	12 September 2021 (UK); 29 October 2021 (USA)
Duggee hosts a reunion for the First Ever Squirrel Club students he taught and looked after when they were younger.
152	48	"The Board Game Badge"	Grant Orchard	Sam Morrison	13 September 2021 (UK); 5 November 2021 (USA)
It's another rainy day outside which means it's a perfect day for playing board games.
153	49	"The Direction Badge"	Grant Orchard	Julia Kent	14 September 2021 (UK); 5 November 2021 (USA)
The Squirrels go outside for another boring walk, but this time for some reason, they can't find their way to get back to the clubhouse! Luckily, Duggee is able to help them out in this episode which teaches the cardinal directions of north, south, east and west.
154	50	"The Perfume Badge"	Grant Orchard	Sander Jones	15 September 2021 (UK); 5 November 2021 (USA)
The Squirrels make their very own perfume and make some commercials to go along with it for good measure.
155	51	"The Building Block Badge"	Grant Orchard	Phillip Warner	16 September 2021 (UK); 12 November 2021 (USA)
The Squirrels become architects so Duggee helps them use blocks in order to bring to life their very own block replica of Duggee's clubhouse.
156	52	"The Walking Badge"	Grant Orchard	James Walsh	17 September 2021 (UK); 12 November 2021 (USA)
Duggee and the Squirrels learn about the many ways you can take a walk with your friends and family and also comes up with another one of Duggee's catchy songs to go along with it.

=== Series 4 (2022–23) ===
No. overall	No. in season	Title	Directed by	Written by	Original release date
157	1	"Norrie's First Day"	Grant Orchard	James Walsh	5 September 2022
On her first day, Norrie enjoys the peace of the Clubhouse away from her 72 siblings. This episode reveals that Norrie was the first of the current Squirrels to join, and therefore she is the oldest. Voiced of Wren Stembridge & Amos Greenall
158	2	"The Moving Badge"	Grant Orchard	Phillip Warner	5 September 2022
Snail is thrilled to be moving house, and the Squirrels help her.
159	3	"Roly's First Day"	Grant Orchard	James Walsh	6 September 2022
On Roly's first day, we learn how he really found his really loud voice! Note: Wren Stembridge voiced Norrie.
160	4	"The Spot The Difference Badge"	Grant Orchard	Phillip Warner	6 September 2022
Duggee looks different, but what is it? By playing some looking games, the Squirrels learn how best to spot the difference.
161	5	"Happy's First Day"	Grant Orchard	James Walsh	7 September 2022
On Happy's first day, we learn where he found his love of water.
162	6	"The Library Badge"	Grant Orchard	Sophie Dutton	7 September 2022
Duggee and the gang travel around the mobile library helping out their friends.
163	7	"Tag's First Day"	Grant Orchard	James Walsh	8 September 2022
Tag learns the importance of listening on his first day.
164	8	"The Hat Badge"	Grant Orchard	Sam Morrison	8 September 2022
King Tiger tries on multiple different hats with the Squirrels' help after Ethel squashed his magic hat.
165	9	"Betty's First Day"	Grant Orchard	James Walsh	9 September 2022
On Betty's first day, she learns to play with others.
166	10	"The Choreography Badge"	Grant Orchard	Sam Morrison	9 September 2022
The Squirrels have a dance-off with Chippo and the Rock Slippy Crew, to learn that it's not about being the best, but just having fun.
167	11	"The Pet Badge"	Grant Orchard	Sophie Dutton	12 September 2022
The Squirrels meet a scrufflelump they want to keep as a pet. Note: Last Voice that Norrie's Voice Wren Stembridge.
168	12	"The Lost Property Badge"	Grant Orchard	Jenny Landreth	13 September 2022
Tag gets lost in the lost property room of the Clubhouse, and the Squirrels must find him! Note: First Voice that Norrie's Voice Florence Dhunna.
169	13	"The Mountain Badge"	Grant Orchard	Sophie Dutton	14 September 2022
The Squirrels have to climb a mountain to save Enid. Guest appearance: Nonso Anozie as the Animal Narrator.
170	14	"The Accessory Badge"	Grant Orchard	Tiernan Douieb	15 September 2022
The Squirrels discover the wonderful world of accessorising, but they later accessorise too much.
171	15	"The Ambition Badge"	Grant Orchard	James Walsh	16 September 2022
The Squirrels learn how to achieve their ambitions, with Tag trying to climb a log, Betty to have Mr. Cuddles (her teddy bear) speaking (a type of) Portuguese, Norrie to learn how to breakdance, Happy with doing the triple-puddle splash, and Roly with growing a big potato, wear a tie, and meeting a real pirate. The only way to get Mr. Cuddles to speak (a type of) Portuguese was to turn him into a big robot. It's unknown if Betty taught Mr. Cuddles to speak European Portuguese or Brazilian Portuguese.
172	16	"The Rainbow Badge"	Grant Orchard	Sophie Dutton	19 September 2022
The Squirrels gather all the colours and make their very own rainbow.
173	17	"The Dream Badge"	Grant Orchard	Jo Clegg	20 September 2022
Duggee helps the Squirrels learn about dreams and what they can mean. We even get to see Duggee's dream, and everyone else's strange dreams too.
174	18	"The Eating Badge"	Grant Orchard	Diggy Hicks-Little	21 September 2022
The Squirrels go on a picnic and learn about all the different ways you can eat.
175	19	"The Delivery Badge"	Grant Orchard	Diggy Hicks-Little	22 September 2022
When Chipmunk's trike breaks down, the Squirrels help deliver his packages.
176	20	"The Same Badge"	Grant Orchard	Sander Jones	23 September 2022
The episode is told from Peggee and the Hummingbirds' perspective. We follow Peggee and the Hummingbirds as they journey up the river to deliver a parcel.
177	21	"The Days of the Week Badge"	Grant Orchard	Sophie Dutton	4 September 2023
The Squirrels want to know how long they will have to wait for Mr. Wobbly the Jolly Juggler's visit.
178	22	"The Feelings Badge"	Grant Orchard	Sophie Dutton	5 September 2023
The Squirrels spot that Happy isn't acting like his normal self today and that he's wearing new sneakers.
179	23	"The Choir Badge"	Grant Orchard	Jo Clegg	6 September 2023
The Squirrels become enchanted when they hear a piece of classical music being performed from Duggee's choir. Duggee teamed up with the BBC Singers choir orchestra to record the soundtrack for this episode at the iconic Maide Vale Studios.
180	24	"The Listening Badge"	Grant Orchard	Phillip Warner	7 September 2023
The Squirrels hear a strange sound for in which they cannot identify very well.
181	25	"The Wisdom Badge"	Grant Orchard	Jo Clegg	8 September 2023
The Squirrels want to learn more about what it means to be a wise guy.
182	26	"The Commuting Badge"	Grant Orchard	Jo Clegg	11 September 2023
Oh no! Norrie is late for Squirrel Club today, so Duggee teaches the remaining Squirrels all about the commute. The reason Norrie was late was because she had the worst commute ever with her dad.
183	27	"The Ball Badge"	Grant Orchard	Sam Morrison	12 September 2023
Duggee shows the Squirrels all the exciting things that a ball can do.
184	28	"The News Badge"	Grant Orchard	Phillip Warner	13 September 2023
The Squirrels get excited to learn that Duggee is making his new yearly annual batch of blueberry juice, and decide to spread the news to everyone that is in this show.
185	29	"The Difficult Badge"	Grant Orchard	Sam Morrison	14 September 2023
The Squirrels discover that Norrie doesn't know how to ride a bike, and have different difficult things to experience on their own.
186	30	"The Cinema Badge"	Grant Orchard	Phillip Warner	15 September 2023
Duggee takes the Squirrels on their first ever field trip to the cinema and they watch a film together at the local movie theatre.
187	31	"The Getting Ready Badge"	Grant Orchard	Diggy Hicks-Little	18 September 2023
Each of the five Squirrels likes to get ready in many different ways in the morning before they go to Squirrel Club.
188	32	"The Size Badge"	Grant Orchard	James Walsh	19 September 2023
The Squirrels are busy eating their lunch when Happy spots noticing a tiny fruit fly on his apple. and they're amazed by how small it is. The fly tells them that there are things even smaller than him like atoms.
189	33	"The Wish Badge"	Grant Orchard	James Walsh	20 September 2023
Duggee explains that in old fairytale stories like Aladdin, for if you rub a lamp three times, a genie will pop out and it can grant wishes and making your dreams come true.
190	34	"The List Badge"	Grant Orchard	Jo Clegg	21 September 2023
Oh no! Duggee has lost his list of schedules for the day's activities at Squirrel Club! So the Squirrels try helping Duggee find his list while doing their own.
191	35	"The Music Video Badge"	Grant Orchard	Sander Jones	22 September 2023
The Squirrels have made their very own song but they wish that they could watch their performance.
192	36	"The Exercise Badge"	Grant Orchard	Sam Morrison	25 September 2023
The Squirrels are feeling sleepy and tired, so Duggee insists that exercising will help give them more energy.
193	37	"The Dos and Don'ts Badge"	Grant Orchard	Phillip Warner	26 September 2023
The Squirrels are misbehaving and getting themselves into trouble today, so Duggee insists that they need to think twice and learn how to be more carefully of what they are doing right and wrong. The silliest thing that you shouldn't do is to put real bears on the bed.
194	38	"The Nature Badge"	Grant Orchard	Dilpreet Kaur Walia	27 September 2023
A more elaborate full episode version of "The Green Planet Badge" short film made in collaboration with nature export and former BBC Two boss David Attenborough, where The Squirrels are excited to learn more about the different plants and animals that exist in their natural worlds and environments, and go into different locations to tell us about animals' habitats.
195	39	"The Recipe Badge"	Grant Orchard	Tiernan Douieb	28 September 2023
The Squirrels learn how to follow and complete a recipe to make food together.
196	40	"The Imagination Badge"	Grant Orchard	Sander Jones	29 September 2023
The Squirrels are getting frustrated because they're too exhausted with their same exact toys that they keep playing with in every single episode. So Duggee advises them to use their imagination, but their imaginations went a lot crazy!

=== Series 5 (2024-25) ===
No. overall	No. in season	Title	Directed by	Written by	Original release date
197	1	"The Carrot Badge"	Grant Orchard	Diggy Hicks-Little	28 June 2024
It's the Carrot Solstice. The Squirrels need to protect the carrots from impatient guests.
198	2	"The Face Painting Badge"	Grant Orchard	Sophie Dutton	9 September 2024
The Squirrels get their faces painted which leads to cases of mistaken identity.
199	3	"The Transport Badge"	Grant Orchard	Phillip Warner	10 September 2024
Duggee's pen pal Rhodri accidentally leaves his hat behind, so Duggee and the Squirrels take a grand journey on all sorts of different vehicles in order to return it to him.
200	4	"The Talent Badge"	Grant Orchard	Tiernan Douieb	11 September 2024
It's King Tiger's talent show and Duggee and the Squirrels are ready to compete.
201	5	"The Mime Badge"	Grant Orchard	Sophie Dutton	12 September 2024
The Squirrels learn the French art form of how to mime, with Duggee showing off to them his impressive skills.
202	6	"The Why Badge"	Grant Orchard	Sam Morrison	13 September 2024
Why do Tag's feet hurt? The answer is right there under the Squirrels' noses!
203	7	"The Sibling Badge"	Grant Orchard	Jo Clegg	16 September 2024
Roly reveals that his mum is pregnant and is expected to be giving birth to having a new baby brother or sister, but Duggee and the Squirrels have some concerning questions about this.
204	8	"The Monster Badge"	Grant Orchard	Tiernan Douieb	17 September 2024
Duggee introduces the Squirrels to Plinky who is the cutest and most adorable monster creature ever, but she wants to earn her Monster Badge.
205	9	"The Diary Badge"	Grant Orchard	James Walsh	18 September 2024
The Squirrels discover Duggee's old locked secret diary and are keen to writing down their own video diary entries.
206	10	"The Metal Detector Badge"	Grant Orchard	Sam Morrison	19 September 2024
Roly needs to use the bathroom, but the door is locked, and Duggee has misplaced the key.
207	11	"The Cheerleading Badge"	Grant Orchard	Sam Morrison	15 September 2025
Who brings a team of cheerleaders to a chess match? Duggee does!
208	12	"The Waiting Badge"	Grant Orchard	Jo Clegg	16 September 2025
How will Duggee and the Squirrels cope with being stuck in a shed for five whole minutes?
209	13	"The Good Choices Badge"	Grant Orchard	Sam Morrison	17 September 2025
The clubhouse is a mess! Roly wonders what will happen if he doesn't make good choices, then the Squirrel Club will close down. Note: This is the only episode to have two different endings. The first one was where the Squirrels didn't get their badges and the Clubhouse is closing down by the C.I.A. (Clubhouse Intelligence Agency), but it is shown that it is all in an imagination cloud that Roly is looking at.
210	14	"The Shopping Badge"	Grant Orchard	James Walsh	18 September 2025
It's Duggee's first time at the big shop. What glories await him in the middle aisle?
211	15	"The Love Badge"	Grant Orchard	Diggy Hicks-Little	19 September 2025
Delivery Chipmunk celebrates love and burritos with a show-stopping song!
212	16	"The Rollercoaster Badge"	Grant Orchard	Jo Clegg	22 September 2025
Hold on tight as the Squirrels build the best rollercoaster ever!
213	17	"The World Record Badge"	Grant Orchard	Adam Beardsmore	23 September 2025
Like Duggee, The Squirrels want to break a world record. Teamwork is the way forward!
214	18	"The In Charge Badge"	Grant Orchard	Tiernan Douieb	24 September 2025
The Squirrels find out that being in charge is trickier than Duggee makes it look.
215	19	"The Laughter Badge"	Grant Orchard	Sophie Dutton	25 September 2025
There are lots of laughs, and one of them, as the Squirrels find out, is very infectious!
216	20	"The Midnight Badge"	Grant Orchard	Diggy Hicks-Little	26 September 2025
Something amazing happens at midnight. The Squirrels try to stay awake to find out what.
