= Slay Duggee =

English heavy metal band

Slay Duggee are a British heavy metal band for young children. They played 'My First Metal Gig' concerts to give young children their first experience of live heavy metal music.

== History ==
The name of Slay Duggee is a pun on the British children's series, Hey Duggee.

Slay Duggee formed in January 2018 to release a heavy metal version of "The Stick Song" from "The Stick Badge" episode of Hey Duggee. The Slay Duggee version was released within 48 hours of the original being broadcast, and was featured on UK radio shortly afterwards. DJ Steve Lamacq, of BBC Radio 6 Music, has described them as "the Lords of Toddler Metal".

In 2018, Slay Duggee collaborated with guitarist James Monteith from Tesseract, and singer Nicky “Scorpion” Calonne from Nekrogoblikon, on a cover version of "Everything Is Awesome" from The Lego Movie. In the same year, Slay Duggee released a Christmas single "Walking in the Air" with singer Daniel Tompkins from Tesseract. In July 2018, the band completed a successful Kickstarter campaign to fund the album Kids Love Metal.

Slay Duggee released their debut album Kids Love Metal in 2018. The album was partially funded by selling wooden sticks on Kickstarter.

Slay Duggee released their second album My First Metal Album in 2019. Featuring heavy metal cover versions of songs such as "Paw Patrol", "PJ Masks", "You've Got A Friend In Me", "Sleeping Bunnies", "Johny Johny (Yes Papa)" and "Daddy Finger".

In 2020, to replace a fundraiser concert cancelled due to COVID19, the band filled Hot Box Live, Chelmsford, UK, with 35,000 ball crawl balls to play a special livestream concert to an audience of one, Angus Grocott, a young quadriplegic fan.

Slay Duggee released their third album Chinese Dogmocracy in 2022. Featuring heavy metal cover versions of songs such as "Spongebob Squarepants (featuring Rachel Aspe from Cage Fight)", "Bluey", "There's A Party In My Tummy", "Toothbrushing Song", "Round and Round The Garden (featuring Princess Beast from Animal Schoolbus)" and a song "Surfin'" written by, and featuring 4-year-old fan Reuben.

Steve Lamacq had Slay Duggee live in session on his BBC Radio 6 Music radio show in August 2019. Steve performed guest duck quacks on the song "Sarah & Duck".

In August 2019, their first live gig 'My First Metal Gig' at Craufurd Arms, Milton Keynes sold out within two hours.

Slay Duggee played a farewell concert at Colchester Arts Centre in November 2022.

== Reformation ==
In 2024, 18 months after Slay Duggee played their farewell show they decided after popular demand that they would reform and start performing once again.

Slay Duggee performed their first return show at the Teddy Rocks festival in Dorset on May 4, 2024. Shortly after this show on May 18 Slay Duggee performed at the Radio City Social in Chelmsford. For the first time, children were not allowed at the concert and it also served as the warm up show for Download Festival.

The band played at Download Festival in 2025 co-hosting the "Destruction in the Doghouse" wrestling event on 11 June 2025.
