= Hey Duggee =

British animated series

- Genre: Preschool; Animated; Adventure; Comedy; Educational television
- Created by: Grant Orchard
- Directed by: Grant Orchard (seasons 1-4); Sander Jones; Malcolm Mole (season 5)
- Voices of: Sander Jones; Jasmine Bartholomew; Poppie Boyes; Duke Davis; Alfie Sanderson; Leo Templer; Dexter Varrall; Bella Green; Ollie Chequer; Forrest Davis; Arabella Duffy; Wren Stembridge; Amos Greenall; Florence Dhunna; Bram Hicks-Little-Jones; Jude Cregan; Frasier Scott; Leo Lambe; Camilla Birkett; Adam Longworth; Lucy Montgomery; Grant Orchard; Phillip Warner
- Narrated by: Alexander Armstrong; Dame Shirley Bassey (The Same Badge)
- Theme music composer: Oliver M.A. Knowles
- Opening theme: "Isn't It Time for Duggee?"
- Ending theme: "Hey Duggee Theme"
- Composers: Tin Sounds; Nic Gill
- Country of origin: United Kingdom
- Original language: English
- No. of series: 5
- No. of episodes: 216 (list of episodes)

Production
- Executive producers: Henrietta Hurford-Jones; Jackie Edwards; Sue Goffe; Nick Hall; Elizabeth Randall
- Producers: Janine Voong; Fleur Jago
- Cinematography: Anna Kubik
- Editors: Anna Kubik (main editor, 2015-2018, senior editor, 2019-2022); Sam Cassidy (2019-2022); Anthony Ratcliffe (2022-2023)
- Camera setup: Gallery
- Running time: 7 minutes
- Production company: Studio AKA

Original release
- Network: CBeebies
- Release: 12 January 2015 – present

Related
- Hey Duggee's Squirrel Club

Hey Duggee is a British pre-school children's animated television series aimed at two to five-year-olds. Created by Grant Orchard, it is produced by Studio AKA, in association with BBC Studios (formerly BBC Worldwide). The show is narrated by Alexander Armstrong.

The programme's characters are anthropomorphic animals, with Duggee communicating in barking. The episodes are based around The Squirrel Club, an activity club for children that Duggee leads. The children – the club's Squirrels – take part in all kinds of activities, have adventures and earn badges for their accomplishments. Each episode shows the Squirrels completing an activity or adventure relating to a badge that they earn at the end of each episode. There is no set formula for every episode, with many referencing or parodying pop culture.

Hey Duggee has five series. It officially premiered on 12 January 2015 after being first shown on 17 December 2014. The BBC and Studio AKA produced a second series in early 2016, with the first episode airing in the United Kingdom on 26 September 2016. A third series was commissioned in October 2017, with the first episode due to be broadcast in Autumn 2018, but was pushed back to 4 March 2019. It aired until September 2021 with a Christmas episode shown in December 2020. The third series received increased acclaim and popularity amongst children and adults alike during the 2020 pandemic lockdowns (and an associated 'stay at home badge' was introduced). It was renewed for a fourth series on 5 September 2022.

In 2022–present, to celebrate the premiere of David Attenborough's The Green Planet documentary on BBC, Hey Duggee created a short film called "The Green Planet Badge" with a guest voice by Attenborough. The short premiered on January 9, 2022 on YouTube.

A spinoff series Hey Duggee's Squirrel Club premiered on 28 April 2025. The original series was also renewed for a fifth season.

The first half of the fifth series began on 28 June 2024 with the episode "The Carrot Badge". After a two-month hiatus, the series started properly on 9 September 2024 with “The Face Painting Badge”.

On October 24, 2025, it was announced Hey Duggee would be renewed for series 6-8.

== Production ==
The programme is animated using the computer program Flash, with a minimalist style using filled shapes with no outlines, which is efficient financially, using only effects that Flash is capable of, and only the Duggee character regularly uses gradients. For example, if there is a frog character, then it usually bears the appearance of a plain green triangle.

The production team consists of around 16 in-house animators, with six to eight scriptwriters, each episode script taking over 6 weeks to develop.

The theme tune utilises chiptune style, described as a nostalgic reference that can be appreciated by parents watching. Other music in the show borrows from the BBC's historic sound library.

== Characters ==
=== Main ===
- Narrator – (Voiced by Alexander Armstrong) the narrator of the show.
- Duggee – (Voiced by Sander Jones) a friendly big brown male dog who lives in a kennel alongside the Squirrels clubhouse and the leader of the Squirrel club. He doesn't speak, but he communicates by the fictional language "Dugguese" by saying "Woof!", and "Ah-woof!", but the Squirrels can understand him and he can understand them. He wears yellow clothing with badges.
- Norrie – (Voiced by Poppie Boyes & Bella Green & Florence Dhunna & Wren Stembridge & Camilla Birkett) a sweet-natured and curious brown mouse. In "The Breakfast Badge", she says she likes shakshouka for breakfast, and in the "Singing Badge", she also said that a "Japanese plum" is her favourite food. She usually wears a pink long-sleeved dress, a yellow tie and purple shoes. She gets to school in a stick car.
- Roly – (Voiced by Leo Templer & Dexter Varrall & Bram Hicks-Little-Jones) an enthusiastic, loud and hyperactive grey hippopotamus who isn't very good at doing fiddly crafts, often tending to just hit them instead. He usually wears orange pants and brown shoes. He gets to school on a yellow tandem.
- Happy – (Voiced by Duke Davis & Forrest Davis & Frasier Scott & Jude Cregan) a tall, easy-going green crocodile, with a love of water and splashing in puddles. According to the Series 4 episode "Happy's First Day", he didn't like water when he was little. He usually wears teal pants, orange shoes and teal glasses. Happy is adopted, as his mother is an elephant. He gets to school in a yellow car.
- Tag – (Voiced by Alfie Sanderson & Ollie Chequer & Amos Greenall & Leo Lambe) a gentle, clumsy blue rhinoceros. He usually wears maroon pants and light orange shoes. He gets to school on a pink bus.
- Betty – (Voiced by Jasmine Bartholomew & Arabella Duffy) a talkative and intelligent purple octopus with five legs/arms. She always wears a pink and yellow band on her head. She gets to school in an orange submarine that can be driven on land.

=== Recurring ===
Sander Jones as:

- Enid – Duggee's pet cat.
- The Rabbits – live in the field near the clubhouse and all sound like hippies, apart from one who speaks French.
- Frog
- Angry Bull – an angry highland bull who often chases Duggee and the Squirrels.
- Chickens
- Army Ant

Phillip Warner as:

- Naughty Monkey – a monkey who loves to cause chaos.
- King Tiger – local royalty whose favourite entertainment is the "jelly-belly dancers".
- The Chickens – live in the hen-house and enjoy watching episodes of a Spanish hospital-drama.
- Ladybird
- Chickens

Grant Orchard as:

- Naughty Mice – a gang of three trouble-making mice styled like a 1950s biker gang; they usually leave the scene with the phrase "Let's bounce".
- Whooooo – a shamanistic owl.
- Mole – a short-sighted animal who has dreams of being a stunt-mole.
- The Rabbits
- Chickens

Adam Longworth as:

- Lord Fingal of Skye Castle – a Scottish Terrier with a Scottish accent and a kilt.
- Tino the Artistic Mouse – a perfectionist mouse whom Roly describes as grumpy.
- Hedgley – a hedgehog who has an African-American accent.
- Mr. (John) Crab – a dramatic orange crab, married to a non-speaking crab named Nigel.
- Eugene – an anxious chipmunk involved in leading various theatrical events.
- Wilbert the Delivery Chipmunk – a postman who has difficulty pronouncing names.
- Thora and Agnes, the two old deer.
- Penguins
- Sgt. Ant

Lucy Montgomery as:

- Hennie – a tall, sports-loving ostrich.
- Chew Chew the Panda – a confectionery-loving panda and wife of King Tiger.
- Fox
- Army Ant
- Emu

Morgana Robinson as:

- Katerina the Flamingo – the Slavic lead swimmer of a synchronised swimming team. In her first appearance, she loses one of her flippers, leaving her foot bare, but the Squirrels help her find it.
- Buggee – a small insect who feels useless due to her small size until the Squirrels show her otherwise.
- Peggee – a wildebeest who leads the Hummingbirds Club.

Masami Eagar as:

- Hatsu, the Japanese Pottery Poodle

Anelisa Lamola as:

- Mrs. Weaver

Tim Digby-Bell as:

- Mr. (Nigel) Crab – Mr. Crab's husband.

Anna Orchard as:

- Pig

=== Other characters ===
- The Hummingbirds – The other group of older animals in the episode The Making Friends Badge, with their very own version of Duggee. They are:
  - Finbar (10 years old) (voiced by Charley Orchard in "The Making Friends Badge" and Ferris Hicks-Little-Jones in "The Same Badge")
  - Merry (9 years old) (voiced by Charley Orchard in "The Making Friends Badge" and Avalon McNamara in "The Same Badge")
  - Chad (10 years old) (voiced by Bastian Varrall in "The Making Friends Badge" and Bram Hicks-Little-Jones in "The Same Badge")
  - Rochelle (11 years old) (voiced by Poppy Green in "The Making Friends Badge" and Mio Eagar in "The Same Badge")
  - Ottie (12 years old) (voiced by Sean Orchard in "The Making Friends Badge" and Magdalena Beardsmore in "The Same Badge")
- Duggly – Duggee's little nephew, voiced by Poppy Green and Charley Orchard.
- Ethel

== Merchandise and licensing deals ==
In the UK, Penguin has published books based on the series.

Golden Bear Toys manufactures Hey Duggee toys sold in the UK.

In 2015, Hey Duggee was adapted into several videogame apps for mobile devices. These include:

- The Big Badge App
- The Big Outdoors App
- We Love Animals
- Colouring
- Jigsaw Puzzles
- The Counting Badge
- The Exploring App
- The Squirrels Club
- The Christmas Badge

As of May 2015, Jasnor holds the master toy licence in Australia and New Zealand.

== "The Stick Song" ==
"The Stick Song" premiered in the series 2 episode, Hey Duggee: The Stick Badge, which was first broadcast in the UK on 7 December 2017. Duggee and the Squirrels are making a campfire when Roly discovers one of his sticks can talk. The stick turns out to be a stick insect and it sings a techno song.

As of 2020, the song has been viewed over 7 million times on YouTube. The track has been featured on BBC Radio 6 Music and BBC Two's Newsnight. Many remixes have been produced, by both the BBC and others, including a heavy metal remix by children's heavy metal band Slay Duggee.

== Reception ==
Stuart Heritage, writing in The Guardian, described the series as being "peerless".

On Twitter, the London Fire Brigade (LFB) in Greenwich complained about "The Dressing-Up Badge". In the episode, Roly dresses up as a firefighter, but is described as being a fireman, which Greenwich LFB described as being outdated whereas the term firefighter is "the preferred respectful, inclusive, non-sexist, non-gendered term that should be being widely used by all media but especially the BBC".

In 2025, the Bayswater Support Group objected to the inclusion of the character Wren, a raccoon described using a singular they pronoun who appeared in the episode "The Sibling Badge" which first aired in 2024.

=== Awards and nominations ===
Year	Award	Category	Nominee	Result
2015	Annecy International Animation Film Festival	TV series	For "The Rescue Badge"	Nominated
2015	British Academy Children's Awards	Pre-School Animation	For "Series"	Nominated
2016	International Emmy Kids Awards	Kids: Preschool		Nominated
2016	British Academy Children's Awards	Pre-School Animation	For "Series"	Won
2017	International Emmy Kids Awards	Kids: Preschool		Won
2017	British Academy Children's Awards	Pre-School Animation	For "Series"	Won
2017	Emile Awards	Best Background and character design in a TV/Broadcast Production		Won
2018	British Academy Children's Awards	Pre-School Animation	For "Series"	Won
2019	International Emmy Kids Awards	Best Preschool Program		Won
2019	Kidscreen Awards	Best Animated Series		Won
2019	Annie Awards	Best Animated Television/Broadcast Production: Preschool		Nominated
2019	British Academy Children's Awards	Pre-School Animation	For "Series"	Nominated
2020	Kidscreen Awards	Best Animated Series	Hey Duggee	Won
2020	Kidscreen Awards	Best Voice Talent	Hey Duggee	Won
2020	Kidscreen Awards	Best Design	Hey Duggee	Won
2020	Kidscreen Awards	Best Music	Hey Duggee	Won
2021	Kidscreen Awards	Best Animated Series	Hey Duggee	Nominated
2022	British Academy Children's Awards	Pre-School Animation	For "Series"	Won
