= Sarah & Duck =

British animated children's television series

- The eponymous main characters, Sarah (left), and Duck (right)
- Genre: Preschool
- Created by: Sarah Gomes Harris; Tim O'Sullivan
- Directed by: Tim O'Sullivan
- Voices of: Tasha Lawrence; Lesley Nicol; Andy Nyman; Pete Gallagher; David Carling; Tim O'Sullivan
- Narrated by: Roger Allam
- Composers: Tanera Dawkins & Tim O'Sullivan
- Country of origin: United Kingdom
- Original language: English
- No. of series: 3
- No. of episodes: 120 (list of episodes)

Production
- Executive producers: Chris White; Alison Stewart
- Producer: Jamie Badminton
- Editors: Graham Silcock (series 1); Mark Edwards (series 2); Michele Chiappa (series 3)
- Running time: 7 minutes / Extras: Approximately 1 minute
- Production company: Karrot Animation

Original release
- Network: CBeebies
- Release: 18 February 2013 – 15 December 2017

Sarah & Duck is a British animated children's television series created by Sarah Gomes Harris and Tim O'Sullivan, and produced by Karrot Animation for the BBC. Though designed as a story-driven animation primarily targeted at 4 to 6 year old children since premiering at the MIPCOM trade show in 2012, the series has a small adult following.

Sarah & Duck was first broadcast on the UK channel CBeebies on 18 February 2013. A total of 120 episodes have been commissioned, with 40 each for Series 1, 2, and 3. The third series started in October 2016.

== Premise ==
The series follows Sarah, a very kind and polite seven-year-old girl with big eyes, rosy cheeks and a green hat, and her best friend Duck, a mallard. The central theme is the relationship between these two characters and the adventures they have together. CBeebies states that the show has two learning themes: "friendship and imagination" and "problem solving".

== Themes ==
Sarah and Duck is an animated series about empathy. Each five-minute story is told with humour and joy. The show is about the friendship of a wide-eyed girl, her pet duck, and their adventures. Sarah and Duck laugh and sing, and play all kinds of games with their friends, as they learn to deal with the emotions of childhood.

== Episodes ==
Series	Episodes	Originally released	
Series	Episodes	First released	Last released
1	40	18 February 2013	19 December 2013
2	40	11 August 2014	15 December 2015
3	40	18 October 2016	15 December 2017

== Cast and characters ==
=== Main ===
Name	Voice cast	About
Sarah	Tasha Lawrence	Sarah is a very kind, polite and somewhat eccentric seven year old girl. She is best friends with Duck. She plays the tuba, likes sea cows (manatees), and drinks "lemon water".
Duck	Micheal Carrington	Duck is Sarah's quacky, flappy best friend. He has a penchant for eating bread.
Narrator	Roger Allam	The Narrator talks to Sarah and Duck, asks them questions and gives them suggestions, giving them a more nuanced approach to certain challenges.
Scarf Lady	Lesley Nicol	Scarf Lady is a forgetful old lady who loves knitting. She lives in a house full of woollen items. She has a talking knitting bag and a pet donkey.
Bag	Andy Nyman	Bag is Scarf Lady's knitting bag. He corrects Scarf Lady when she gets confused and has a snarky attitude.
Donkey	None	Donkey is Scarf Lady's pet. He looks sad but isn't really.

=== Other characters ===
- John is Sarah's Japanese friend voiced by Luca Pilkington Massey.
- Flamingo is John's friend, as Duck is to Sarah.
- The Shallots are planted by Sarah and Duck. There are three similar-sized and one tiny one. The three repeat the same phrase when spoken to while the tiny one says a variation thereof. They live in Sarah's front garden by the door, and are voiced by Tim O'Sullivan and Tony Clarke.
- Rainbow makes friends with Sarah and Duck after a rain shower. He is very ticklish, and voiced by David Carling.
- Moon first meets Sarah and Duck at the Big Shop when he is heading to work at night. He is voiced by Pete Gallagher.
- Venus is a good friend of Moon and normally Sarah only sees her at night. She is played by Hilary Maclean.
- Mars, a gruff Sergeant Major type character, joins Moon and Venus from time to time. Voiced by Tim O'Sullivan.
- Hat Lady (or Hattie) is Scarf Lady's old sporting rival and runs the local hat museum. Like her arch-nemesis Scarf Lady, she is voiced by Lesley Nicol.
- Umbrella is scared of the rain and voiced by Jamie Oram.
- Bug is a large ladybird that lives in Sarah and Duck's house plant and collects buttons.
- The Cloud Captain is a French engineer who operates the weather system from a tower within the local park, voiced by Derek Griffiths.
- The Ribbon Sisters are Sarah and Duck's quiet next-door neighbours, who are identical twins. They're told apart by their differently coloured sunglasses. They like to play with ribbons and are voiced by Kiki Brooks.
- Scooter Boy is boy who brings a scooter wherever he goes, and is very safety conscious. He is voiced by Dylan Issberner.
- Plate Girl is a girl who has a habit of carrying a plate with her at all times. She is voiced by Yaeli Miller.
- Cake is a living cake created by Sarah who helps bake. She is voiced by Andy Nyman.
- Bread Man runs the local bakery, which Sarah and especially Duck like to visit. He is voiced by David Carling.
- Bus Man operates the bus which often takes Sarah and Scarf Lady to regular destinations such as the Zoo and the Big Shop.
- Tortoise is slow and easily scared. His shell has windows so that he can look out. He doesn't speak.
- Leftover Wool is a bundle of wool that sits patiently in Scarf Lady's wool room, and is voiced by Andy Nyman.
- Poetry Pete is a poet first featured on one of Scarf Lady's LPs. He is voiced by Simon Callow.
- Comet is an old friend of Moon, Mars and Venus who has lost his memory on his last visit to Earth. He is voiced by Sylvester McCoy.

== Production ==
The series is produced using computer-assisted animation techniques and the Adobe After Effects and CelAction2D packages.

A second series began airing on 11 August 2014.

On 17 June 2015 it was renewed for a third series which aired starting the 18 October 2016 on CBeebies.

== Broadcast ==
BBC Worldwide has secured global distribution and merchandising rights for the new show and airs it on BBC Worldwide's network of channels. On 19 August 2013, Sarah & Duck was first broadcast in the U.S. on Sprout. The first series of Sarah & Duck was also broadcast in Japan (NHK), Norway (NRK), Sweden (SVT), Denmark (DR), Finland (YLE), Germany (KiKa), Portugal (RTP), Iceland (RUV), the Netherlands (NPO), and Israel (Hop! Channel). In Canada, it is broadcast on the Family Jr. channel. In Australia, it is also broadcast on ABC Kids. On 12 February 2016, Sarah & Duck was made available in Mexico on Netflix, but it was dropped from the service on 12 August 2018 without ever airing episodes made in 2017–2018.

In August 2023, Karrot Animation reacquired the show's licensing and merchandising rights. However, BBC Studios remains as distributor for the property.

== DVD Releases ==
Release No.	Release Name	Episodes	Number and duration	R2 release date
1	Lots of Shallots and Other Stories	Lots of Shallots, Sarah Duck & the Penguin, Cheer Up Donkey, Cake Bake, Scarf Lady's House, Robot Juice, Bouncy Ball, Rainbow Lemon, Sit Shop, Kite Flight	70 mins	17 February 2014
2	Doubles and Other Stories	Doubles, Umbrella and the Rain, Big Shop, Woollen Music, Fairground, Sarah Gets a Cold, Ribbon Sisters, Stargazing, Coloured Light, Strawberry Souffle	70 mins	8 September 2014
3	Balloon Race and Other Stories	Balloon Race, Camera, Tapping Shoes, Fireworks Dance, Fancy Park, Pipe Conductor, Slow Quest, World Bread Day, Pond Princess, Puncture Pump	70 mins	16 February 2015
4	Petal Light Picking and Other Stories	Petal Light Picking, Bobsleigh, Plate Fog, Scared of Stairs, Moon Paint, The Play, Bread Bike, Bug's Button Bank, No More Wool, Octogon Club	70 mins	19 October 2015
5	Cloud Tower and Other Stories	Cloud Tower, Outside Outside, Umbrella Bubbles, Sound Jumble, The Mouse's Birthday, Tortoise Snooze, Fast Slow Bungalow, Bags of Bags, Ribbon Fall, Garden Gaming	70 mins	15 February 2016
6	Duck Hotel and Other Stories	Duck Hotel, Origami Overload, Shallot Circus, Toy Tidy, Plate Escape, The Big Sleepover, Paisley Sea, Duck's Quack, Rainbow's Niece, Decorating Donkey	70 mins	16 May 2016
7	Beach Break and Other Stories	Beach Break, Parasol Show, Extra Bounce, Cake Relocate, Lost Librarian, Scooter Stand Still, Music Fixer, Wool on Wheels, Lemon Cafe, Star Renovation	70 mins	25 July 2016
8	Duck Flies and Other Stories	Duck Flies, Seacow Snowtrail, Woolly Memories, Bubble Bumbling, Toggle Tangle, Tummy Talk, Moon's Exhibition, Pond Prose, The Art of Pink, Bug Bop	70 mins	17 October 2016
9	Train Fudge and Other Stories	Train Fudge, Picture Planes, Hat Fuss, Dewy Morning, Sticker Swap, Magic Panic, Birthday Buoy, Alarm Clock, Twang Ball, Auto Cat	70 mins	20 February 2017
10	Constable Quack and Other Stories	Constable Quack, Fluff Bread, Moonbow, Bench Blocked, Planetarium Aquarium, Shallot Boat, Cake Decorate, Balloon Barnacles, Basking Shark, Old Toys	70 mins	2 October 2017
11	Brolly Bus and Other Stories	Brolly Bus, Rainbow Race, Hair Cut, Arcade Dance Off, Mars as Moon, Donkey Jump, Castle Scribbling, Haber Dasher, Cloud Jam, Pillow Fill	70 mins	12 February 2018
12	Snowball Skate and Other Stories	Snowball Skate, Mountain Mints, Comet's Coming, Perimeter Pals, Hedge Opera, Boo Night, Park Trimming, Whatsathingy, Cinema Scoot, Ribbon Alvida	73 mins	8 October 2018

== Reception ==
A pilot for Sarah & Duck was first aired at the Cartoon Forum 2010 where it was warmly received. The series was an immediate hit in the UK, and the first four episodes were the most popular pre-school programmes of their week on the BBC catch-up TV service, iPlayer.

The first episode 'Lots of Shallots' was part of the official selection for the 2013 Annecy International Animated Film Festival.

In October 2013 Sarah & Duck was nominated for the British Academy Children's Award for Pre-School Animation. The award went to Timmy Time.

In January 2014 Sarah & Duck was nominated in the pre-school category of the British Animation Awards.

In November 2014, with a second nomination, Sarah & Duck won the British Academy Children's Award for Pre-School Animation.

In February 2017, it was tied in the Kidscreen Award for best animated series with Doc McStuffins.

== Stage version ==
A live stage production called "Sarah and Duck's Big Top Birthday" was performed by Millenium Entertainment International beginning May 2018 and ending in 2023.
