= Yoko! Jakamoko! Toto! =

U.K. TV series

- Yoko Jakamoko Toto
- Genre: Children's TV series
- Created by: Tony Collingwood
- Written by: Jimmy Hibbert; Trevor Ricketts; Tony Collingwood; Moya O'Shea; James Mason; Chris Drew
- Directed by: Tony Collingwood; Andrea O'Tran
- Voices of: Alex Kelly; Rob Rackstraw; Alistair McGowan; Gary Martin; Maria Darling; Colin McFarlane; Alan Marriott; Kate Harbour; Moya O'Shea
- Theme music composer: Roger Jackson
- Composer: Roger Jackson
- Country of origin: United Kingdom
- Original language: None
- No. of series: 2
- No. of episodes: 52

Production
- Producer: Christopher O'Hare
- Editor: Fred Ziecker
- Running time: 5 minutes per episode (approx.)
- Production company: Collingwood O'Hare Productions Limited

Original release
- Network: ITV (CITV)
- Release: 2 June 2003 – 29 August 2005

Yoko! Jakamoko! Toto! is a British animated children's television series, produced by Collingwood O'Hare Productions Limited, originally distributed by HIT Entertainment and currently distributed by Foothill Entertainment, which aired from 2 June 2003 until 29 August 2005 on CITV, and then rebroadcast on CBeebies from 26 January 2009 to 2 June 2013.

== Plot ==
The television series is about a bird-of-paradise named Yoko, an armadillo named Jakamoko, and a spider monkey named Toto, who live and go on adventures in the wilderness where they all live and can only communicate by saying each other's names.

== Development ==
The series was announced in March 2002 as a co-production between Collingwood O'Hare and Gullane Entertainment, of which both companies would share production and development responsibilities, while Gullane would handle global licensing and distribution rights. CITV was the series' commissioner. After Gullane's purchase by HIT Entertainment later on in the year, they took over the distribution and licensing rights. The series was represented by HIT at MIPCOM 2003.

== Awards ==
Yoko! Jakamoko! Toto! has won numerous industry awards including Best Pilot at the Annecy International Festival of Animation, Best Writer at the British Animation Awards and two British Academy Children's Awards, including Best Writer and Best Pre-School Animation.

== UK Voice Cast ==
- Alex Kelly – Yoko the Bird of Paradise
- Gary Martin – Jakamoko the Armadillo
- Rob Rackstraw – Toto the Spider Monkey
- Alistair McGowan, Kate Harbour, Moya O'Shea, Alan Marriott, Colin McFarlane and Maria Darling – additional voices

== Episode listing ==
=== Series 1 (2003-2004) ===
1. The Special Thing
2. The Meal
3. The Lesson
4. The Scary Monster
5. The Hiccups
6. The Patient
7. The Show
8. The Blip
9. The Very Sticky Thing
10. The Egg
11. The Smell
12. The Fly
13. The Song
14. The Naughty Noise
15. The Shell
16. The Water-Hole
17. The Other Side
18. The Longest Day
19. The Cave
20. The New King
21. The Visit
22. The New Best Friend
23. The Windy Day
24. The In-Crowd
25. The Other Monkey
26. The Oyster

=== Series 2 (2004-2005) ===
1. The Seeds
2. The Traveller
3. The Island
4. The Voice
5. The Chick
6. The Mango
7. The Dance
8. The Rival
9. The Dreamers
10. The Meerkats
11. The Butterfly
12. The Tallest
13. The Contest
14. The Sand
15. The Leaf
16. The Coconut
17. The Bad Word
18. The Log
19. The Puzzle
20. The Whale
21. The Snow
22. The Babysitters
23. The Hole
24. The Girlfriend
25. The Copycat
26. The Night
