= List of Sarah & Duck episodes =

The following is a list of episodes for the British children's television series Sarah & Duck that began airing on CBeebies from 18 February 2013.

== Series overview ==
Series	Episodes	Originally released	
Series	Episodes	First released	Last released
1	40	18 February 2013	19 December 2013
2	40	11 August 2014	15 December 2015
3	40	18 October 2016	15 December 2017

== Episodes ==
=== Series 1 (2013) ===
No. overall	No. in series	Title	Written by	Original release date
1	1	"Lots of Shallots"	Sarah Gomes Harris	18 February 2013
Sarah plants seeds in the garden with Duck. After waiting for a long time, small onions appear.
2	2	"Sarah, Duck and the Penguins"	Sarah Gomes Harris	19 February 2013
Today Duck decides he wants to be a penguin and Sarah takes him to the zoo.
3	3	"Cheer Up Donkey"	Benjamin Cook and Sarah Gomes Harris	20 February 2013
Sarah is babysitting Donkey today, and worries that he is sad. She tries all kinds of things to cheer him up.
4	4	"Cake Bake"	Sarah Gomes Harris	21 February 2013
It's Duck's birthday and Sarah sets about baking a cake, but it doesn't turn out to be an ordinary cake.
5	5	"Scarf Lady's House"	Sarah Gomes Harris	26 February 2013
Today Sarah and Duck meet Scarf Lady and her angry bag.
6	6	"Robot Juice"	Sarah Gomes Harris	25 February 2013
Duck plays with his favorite toy, Robot. Unfortunately the Robot breaks and Duck dresses as a robot himself.
7	7	"Bouncy Ball"	Sarah Gomes Harris	22 February 2013
Sarah and Duck go to the shop to buy a new ball, but unfortunately the new ball doesn't bounce at all.
8	8	"Rainbow Lemon"	Sarah Gomes Harris	27 February 2013
Sarah and Duck go to the park to follow the rainbow journey.
9	9	"Sit Shop"	Sarah Gomes Harris	28 February 2013
Sarah and Duck are looking for a new chair and come across a special chair in the shop they call Sit Shop.
10	10	"Kite Flight"	Sarah Gomes Harris	1 March 2013
It's a very windy day and Sarah and Duck decide to fly a kite.
11	11	"Umbrella and the Rain"	Benjamin Cook and Sarah Gomes Harris	18 March 2013
Sarah finds an umbrella that doesn't seem to like the rain.
12	12	"Big Shop"	Sarah Gomes Harris	19 March 2013
Sarah and Duck visit a large department store, looking for some new toys.
13	13	"Woollen Music"	Sarah Gomes Harris	20 March 2013
Scarf Lady's Jukebox inspires Scarf Lady to knit an instrument band.
14	14	"Doubles"	Sarah Gomes Harris	21 March 2013
Sarah and Duck try to play a tennis doubles match, but are two players short.
15	15	"Fairground"	Sarah Gomes Harris	22 March 2013
A Fairground is being held in the park, but Sarah & Duck can't find their bench. They take a ride on a ferris wheel with Moon and locate it. Moon had trouble squeezing into his safety belt.
16	16	"Sarah Gets A Cold"	Benjamin Cook and Sarah Gomes Harris	25 March 2013
When Sarah has a cold, Duck helps her enjoy a visit to the doctors.
17	17	"Ribbon Sisters"	Benjamin Cook and Sarah Gomes Harris	26 March 2013
Sarah and Duck are exercising but the neighbours need their help.
18	18	"Stargazing"	Sarah Gomes Harris	29 March 2013
Sarah and Duck are excited about seeing some shooting stars.
19	19	"Coloured Light"	Sarah Gomes Harris	28 March 2013
Rainbow's colourful glow inspires an art project.
20	20	"Strawberry Souffle"	Sarah Gomes Harris	27 March 2013
Sarah and Duck work together to make a delicious souffle.
21	21	"Camera"	Benjamin Cook and Sarah Gomes Harris	12 August 2013
Inspired by a nature documentary, Sarah and Duck attempt to take photographs of birds.
22	22	"Tapping Shoes"	Benjamin Cook and Sarah Gomes Harris	13 August 2013
Sarah needs some new shoes, but picks out a very unusual pair.
23	23	"Bobsleigh"	Benjamin Cook and Sarah Gomes Harris	14 August 2013
Sarah and Duck learn to Bobsleigh and have a speedy, snowy adventure with Scarf Lady's help.
24	24	"Fireworks Dance"	Benjamin Cook and Sarah Gomes Harris	15 August 2013
A game of hide and seek takes longer than usual when Duck gets scared by some fireworks.
25	25	"Fancy Park"	Benjamin Cook and Sarah Gomes Harris	16 August 2013
When their local park is closed, Sarah and Duck try to find a suitable alternative.
26	26	"Pipe Conductor"	Benjamin Cook and Sarah Gomes Harris	19 August 2013
Sarah and Duck are woken up by a loud clanging overhead and decide to investigate the noise.
27	27	"Slow Quest"	Benjamin Cook and Sarah Gomes Harris	20 August 2013
Tortoise is on a mission straight through Sarah and Duck's house! The pair try to find out what he wants.
28	28	"World Bread Day"	Benjamin Cook and Sarah Gomes Harris	21 August 2013
When there's a bread festival in the park, Sarah & Duck find themselves part of an exciting treasure hunt.
29	29	"Pond Princess"	Benjamin Cook and Sarah Gomes Harris	22 August 2013
Sarah becomes princess for a day by the ducks in the park because she feeds them so well, so she tries to work out what her royal duties should be!
30	30	"Scared of Stairs"	Benjamin Cook and Sarah Gomes Harris	23 August 2013
John and Flamingo get invited around to Sarah and Duck's house, but Sarah and Duck must help John get over his fear of stairs.
31	31	"Balloon Race"	Benjamin Cook and Sarah Gomes Harris	4 November 2013
Scarf Lady takes to the skies in a knitted hot air balloon to race against her old sporting friend, the Hat Man.
32	32	"Puncture Pump"	Benjamin Cook and Sarah Gomes Harris	5 November 2013
When their tandem bike gets a flat tire, Sarah and Duck hope to get help from the local bike shop.
33	33	"Plate Fog"	Benjamin Cook and Sarah Gomes Harris	6 November 2013
Sarah and Duck turn into detectives when their friend, Plate Girl, loses her plate on a foggy day.
34	34	"Moon Paint"	Benjamin Cook and Sarah Gomes Harris	7 November 2013
Sarah and Duck give Moon painting lessons after being inspired by a trip to the Art Gallery.
35	35	"The Play"	Benjamin Cook and Sarah Gomes Harris	8 November 2013
Sarah and Duck dress up as each other and decide to perform a play!
36	36	"Bread Bike"	Benjamin Cook and Sarah Gomes Harris	11 November 2013
Sarah and Duck help the local baker make deliveries.
37	37	"Bug's Button Bank"	Benjamin Cook and Sarah Gomes Harris	12 November 2013
Bug's plant is looking droopy, but his button collecting seems to be the cause of the problem...
38	38	"No More Wool"	Benjamin Cook and Sarah Gomes Harris	13 November 2013
Scarf Lady has run out of wool so Sarah and Duck help her get more by harvesting some, but not from a sheep, but from a wool-growing tree.
39	39	"Octagon Club"	Benjamin Cook and Sarah Gomes Harris	14 November 2013
Sarah decides that octagons are her favorite shape, so she decides to find some things that are that shape. But when she can't find anything that is octagon-shaped, she decides to get her friends to help her.
40	40	"Petal Light Picking"	Sarah Gomes Harris	19 December 2013
Sarah wants some special lights for her Christmas tree and Bug knows where she might find some.

=== Series 2 (2014–15) ===
No. overall	No. in series	Title	Written by	Original release date
41	1	"Outside Outside"	Benjamin Cook, Sarah Gomes Harris, and Tim O'Sullivan	11 August 2014
The Shallots want to explore beyond the front garden, so Sarah comes up with a plan.
42	2	"Umbrella Bubbles"	Benjamin Cook, Sarah Gomes Harris, and Tim O'Sullivan	12 August 2014
After getting muddy, Umbrella has to brave his fear of getting wet and take his first bath!
43	3	"Cloud Tower"	Benjamin Cook, Sarah Gomes Harris, and Tim O'Sullivan	13 August 2014
A search for shade on a hot day leads Sarah and Duck to discover a fascinating tower in the park.
44	4	"Sound Jumble"	Benjamin Cook, Sarah Gomes Harris, and Tim O'Sullivan	14 August 2014
When Sarah hears some interesting music on the radio, she and Duck try and recreate it.
45	5	"The Mouse's Birthday"	Benjamin Cook, Sarah Gomes Harris, and Tim O'Sullivan	15 August 2014
Sarah is hoping for a nice, quiet birthday, but does not get her wish once her friends arrive.
46	6	"Tortoise Snooze"	Benjamin Cook, Sarah Gomes Harris, and Tim O'Sullivan	14 October 2014
Sarah & Duck help Tortoise prepare to hibernate.
47	7	"Fast Slow Bungalow"	Benjamin Cook, Sarah Gomes Harris, and Tim O'Sullivan	21 October 2014
John and Flamingo ask Sarah and Duck over for rice cakes and invite them to play their favourite game.
48	8	"Bags of Bags"	Benjamin Cook, Sarah Gomes Harris, and Tim O'Sullivan	28 October 2014
Sarah and Duck help Scarf Lady find her Bag after she misplaces him in the Big Shop.
49	9	"Ribbon Fall"	Ilana Darrant, Sarah Gomes Harris, and Tim O'Sullivan	4 November 2014
The Ribbon sisters invite Sarah and her feathered friend to the park for their favourite seasonal event.
50	10	"Garden Gaming"	Benjamin Cook, Sarah Gomes Harris, and Tim O'Sullivan	11 November 2014
Duck is getting frustrated with the controls on his computer game Mister Jump Bread versus The Monster Toast, so Sarah creates a more bird-friendly game that Duck can play.
51	11	"Seacow Snow Trail"	Benjamin Cook, Sarah Gomes Harris, and Tim O'Sullivan	16 December 2014
Sarah and Duck have received some Christmas presents and are keen to find out who delivered them.
52	12	"Origami Overload"	Benjamin Cook, Sarah Gomes Harris, and Tim O'Sullivan	27 January 2015
John is excellent at origami, but he is having a little trouble with his flamingos.
53	13	"Shallot Circus"	Benjamin Cook, Sarah Gomes Harris, and Tim O'Sullivan	28 January 2015
The Shallots have discovered acrobatics and are inspired by the Ribbon Sisters to put on a show.
54	14	"Toy Tidy"	Benjamin Cook, Sarah Gomes Harris, and Tim O'Sullivan	29 January 2015
Duck is being extremely untidy with his toys, so Sarah works out a way to turn tidying up into a game.
55	15	"Plate Escape"	John Randolph Davies, Sarah Gomes Harris, and Tim O'Sullivan	30 January 2015
Sarah, Duck and Plate Girl discover some unusual inhabitants at the Big Shop.
56	16	"The Big Sleepover"	Benjamin Cook, Sarah Gomes Harris, and Tim O'Sullivan	3 February 2015
Sarah invites some friends around for a sleepover, but it is hard to sleep when you get to thinking about things.
57	17	"Paisley Sea"	Benjamin Cook, Sarah Gomes Harris, and Tim O'Sullivan	4 February 2015
Sarah and Duck's bus is diverted on its way to the zoo, and it makes a couple of important stops underwater.
58	18	"Duck's Quack"	Ilana Darrant, Sarah Gomes Harris, and Tim O'Sullivan	5 February 2015
Duck loses his voice, so Sarah sets about getting him a new one.
59	19	"Rainbow's Niece"	Benjamin Cook, Sarah Gomes Harris, and Tim O'Sullivan	6 February 2015
Rainbow tells Sarah about his niece, whom he misses very much. So, Sarah and the Cloud Captain work hard to create a rare a Double Rainbow.
60	20	"Decorating Donkey"	Alex Howley, Benjamin Cook, Sarah Gomes Harris, and Tim O'Sullivan	10 February 2015
It is time for Tortoise to wake up from his sleep, so Sarah and Duck arrange a wake-up party. Donkey, however, finds the decorations very tasty.
61	21	"Duck Hotel"	Benjamin Cook, Sarah Gomes Harris, and Tim O'Sullivan	11 February 2015
Duck wins a trip to a fancy duck hotel. Sarah goes along too, but finds it hard to relax when everything is designed for ducks.
62	22	"Parasol Show"	Benjamin Cook, Sarah Gomes Harris, and Tim O'Sullivan	12 May 2015
Sarah and Duck accompany umbrella to a parasol show to meet up with his pen pal. Instead, he meets an intriguing new prospect.
63	23	"Extra Bounce"	John Randolph Davies, Benjamin Cook, Sarah Gomes Harris, and Tim O'Sullivan	13 May 2015
John has a bouncy ball that is just too bouncy. Sarah and Duck take him to the ball dispenser and encounter many balls that bounce a little differently.
64	24	"Cake Relocate"	Benjamin Cook, Sarah Gomes Harris, and Tim O'Sullivan	14 May 2015
Cake is tired of living in the fridge, so Sarah and Duck help him think about where else he would like to stay.
65	25	"Lost Librarian"	Benjamin Cook, Sarah Gomes Harris, and Tim O'Sullivan	15 May 2015
The librarian has lost his big reference book and Sarah thinks her toy periscope might help with the search.
66	26	"Scooter Stand Still"	Benjamin Cook, Sarah Gomes Harris, and Tim O'Sullivan	19 May 2015
Scooter Boy gets his confidence knocked after a small accident, so Sarah and Duck help him to get it back.
67	27	"Music Fixer"	Benjamin Cook, Sarah Gomes Harris, and Tim O'Sullivan	20 May 2015
Sarah's tuba is making some very peculiar sounds, so a trip to the Music Shop is in order.
68	28	"Wool on Wheels"	Benjamin Cook, Sarah Gomes Harris, and Tim O'Sullivan	21 May 2015
Scarf Lady holds a knitted treats sale in the park, but the weather causes a problem...
69	29	"Lemon Cafe"	Benjamin Cook, Sarah Gomes Harris, and Tim O'Sullivan	22 May 2015
Sarah and Duck discover a Lemon Cafe in the park, but it seems to be nearly closing time.
70	30	"Star Renovation"	Benjamin Cook, Sarah Gomes Harris, and Tim O'Sullivan	21 August 2015
Venus has attempted to redecorate the night sky, causing confusion.
71	31	"Woollen Memories"	Eddie Robson, Sarah Gomes Harris, and Tim O'Sullivan	28 August 2015
Sarah and Duck decide to recreate the footage from Scarf Lady's old film reels.
72	32	"Beach Break"	Ilana Darrant, Sarah Gomes Harris, and Tim O'Sullivan	31 August 2015
Sarah and Duck decide to spend a day at the beach and plan to build some sand animals.
73	33	"Bubble Bumbling"	Ilana Darrant, Sarah Gomes Harris, and Tim O'Sullivan	4 September 2015
The Bubble Man is in town so a visit to the Big Shop is in order.
74	34	"Toggle Tangle"	Benjamin Cook, Sarah Gomes Harris, and Tim O'Sullivan	11 September 2015
After Sarah helps Scarf Lady prepare the wool for her roof, she settles down for a sleep.
75	35	"Tummy Talk"	Benjamin Cook, Sarah Gomes Harris, and Tim O'Sullivan	27 November 2015 (Note: Aired on Sprout in the U.S. on 10 October 2015.)
When Sarah forgets her sandwich, her rumbling tummy inadvertently starts a conversation with a frog.
76	36	"Moon's Exhibition"	Benjamin Cook, Sarah Gomes Harris, and Tim O'Sullivan	1 December 2015
A trip to the art gallery unexpectedly helps Duck with the hunt for his lost toy Rhino.
77	37	"Pond Prose"	Eddie Robson, Sarah Gomes Harris, and Tim O'Sullivan	2 December 2015 (Note: Aired on Sprout in the U.S. on 15 October 2015.)
Sarah is inspired by listening to a poetry record and decides to make up some poetry of her own.
78	38	"The Art of Pink"	Benjamin Cook, Sarah Gomes Harris, and Tim O'Sullivan	3 December 2015 (Note: Aired on Sprout in the U.S. on 17 October 2015.)
The art gallery holds a celebration of the colour pink and Sarah is keen to take part.
79	39	"Bug Bop"	Benjamin Cook, Sarah Gomes Harris, and Tim O'Sullivan	4 December 2015 (Note: Aired on Sprout in the U.S. on 14 October 2015.)
Bug and his friends lead the duo to their outdoor music concert.
80	40	"Duck Flies"	Benjamin Cook, Sarah Gomes Harris, and Tim O'Sullivan	15 December 2015 (Note: Aired on Sprout in the U.S. on 19 October 2015.)
When Duck decides to migrate, Sarah remembers the day she and Duck met.

=== Series 3 (2016–17) ===
No. overall	No. in series	Title	Original release date
81	1	"Picture Planes"	18 October 2016
When Sarah and Duck are racing paper planes, they chance upon an exciting discovery.
82	2	"Hat Fuss"	19 October 2016
Scarf Lady needs some fresh inspiration & Sarah decides that the hat museum is the perfect place to visit.
83	3	"Dewy Morning"	20 October 2016
Sarah and Duck are so keen to visit the art shop, they get there too early and have to find things to keep themselves entertained.
84	4	"Sticker Swap"	25 October 2016
Sarah is keen to complete her sticker album, so she sets off to see if her friends can help with her collection.
85	5	"Train Fudge"	26 October 2016
Sarah and Duck take an unexpected train trip whilst on their quest to buy some fudge.
86	6	"Magic Panic"	27 October 2016
Umbrella needs Sarah and Duck's help after he promises to put on a magic show.
87	7	"Birthday Buoy"	1 November 2016
Sarah, Duck and Flamingo arrange a nautical surprise for John's birthday.
88	8	"Alarm Cluck"	2 November 2016
Duck keeps oversleeping, so Sarah decides he needs his own alarm clock.
89	9	"Twang Ball"	3 November 2016
Scarf Lady introduces Sarah and Duck to a new game involving knitted sporting equipment.
90	10	"Auto Cat"	4 November 2016
Duck has some competition for Sarah's attention when a brand new toy arrives.
91	11	"Fluff Bread"	4 April 2017
Sarah and Duck help Bread Man and Cake bake some unique bread for Flamingo and John.
92	12	"Moon Bow"	5 April 2017
Rainbow gets to experience the night for the first time.
93	13	"Mountain Mints"	6 April 2017
Scarf Lady's poetry records inspire a snowy train ride to the mountains.
94	14	"Bench Blocked"	11 April 2017
When Sarah and Duck's favourite bench is in use, the pair find other things to do in the park.
95	15	"Planetarium Aquarium"	12 April 2017
Sarah and Duck go to the aquarium to track down a waving fish.
96	16	"Shallot Boat"	13 April 2017
After a night of strong rain, the Shallots set sail on a seafaring adventure.
97	17	"Cake Decorate"	18 April 2017
Cake decides to teach Sarah and Duck how to decorate with icing.
98	18	"Balloon Barnacles"	19 April 2017
Sarah's hat goes on an adventure without her, on top of a balloon.
99	19	"Basking Shark"	20 April 2017
Sarah is keen to adopt a sea creature, but doesn't get her first choice.
100	20	"Old Toys"	25 April 2017
Duck is bored of his toy collection, so he and Sarah search for old toys in the attic.
101	21	"Hair Cut"	20 June 2017
Sarah's hair keeps getting in the way, so it's time for a trip to the hairdresser.
102	22	"Constable Quack"	27 June 2017
After their snacks go missing, Sergeant Sarah and Constable Quack are on the trail of the biscuit burglar.
103	23	"Arcade Dance Off"	4 July 2017
Stumbling across an arcade, Sarah takes on a dancing challenge with John.
104	24	"Mars As Moon"	11 July 2017
Mars tries to fill in for a missing moon, but needs a little coaching from Sarah and Duck.
105	25	"Donkey Jump"	18 July 2017
Sarah and Duck try to help Donkey get his jumping confidence back by building a surprise for him in their back garden.
106	26	"Rainbow Race"	25 July 2017
When Rainbow has to go before finishing his story, the gang try to work out how it ends.
107	27	"Perimeter Pals"	1 August 2017
Sarah, Duck and Bug set off on a big adventure through uncharted territory as they attempt to cycle all the way around the park.
108	28	"Pillow Fill"	8 August 2017
Scarf Lady helps Sarah and Duck catch the fluffs and puffs to refill their pillows.
109	29	"Castle Scribbling"	15 August 2017
Whilst visiting a castle, Sarah and Duck's drawings lead them to an exciting discovery.
110	30	"Cloud Jam"	22 August 2017
Music Lady needs Sarah and Duck's help with a music-loving stowaway.
111	31	"Boo Night"	28 October 2017
Sarah and Duck learn all about Boo Night and attempt to make their own scary costumes.
112	32	"Comet's Coming"	14 November 2017
Sarah and Duck are excited to visit the observatory to see a passing comet.
113	33	"Whatsathingy"	15 November 2017
Scarf Lady has been knitting in her sleep, but what has she made?
114	34	"Brolly Bus"	16 November 2017
Sarah and Duck are going to take Umbrella to the Big Shop, but Umbrella misses the stop to get off.
115	35	"Hedge Opera"	17 November 2017
Sarah and Duck hear singing in the garden.
116	36	"Park Trimming"	21 November 2017
Sarah and Duck spot a patch of garden in the park that needs some care, but can't seem to find a gardener.
117	37	"Haber Dasher"	22 November 2017
When the zip on Sarah's hoodie breaks, Scarf Lady suggests a trip to the haberdasher to get it fixed.
118	38	"Cinema Scoot"	23 November 2017
Sarah and Duck join Scooter Boy at the cinema to watch his favourite film, but the sound doesn't seem to be working.
119	39	"Snowball Skate"	14 December 2017
Sarah and Duck explore a Winter Fair in the park and discover an amazing skating rink inside a giant snowball!
120	40	"Ribbon Alvida"	15 December 2017
An excited Sarah and Duck take the Shallots to see the Ribbon Sisters perform with their family circus.
