= Rastamouse =

British children's television series

- Genre: Animated; Children's; Musical
- Created by: Genevieve Webster; Michael De Souza
- Developed by: Derek Mogford
- Directed by: Derek Mogford
- Starring: Reggie Yates; Sharon Duncan Brewster; William Vanderpuye; Cornell John
- Composer: Andrew Kingslow
- Countries of origin: United Kingdom; Canada
- Original language: English
- No. of seasons: 3
- No. of episodes: 104

Production
- Producers: Eugenio Perez; Greg Boardman
- Editors: Alan Rogers; Stuart Bruce
- Running time: 11 minutes
- Production companies: Three Stones; Dinamo Productions; Little Roots; The Rastamouse Company; DHX Media

Original release
- Network: CBeebies
- Release: 31 January 2011 – 15 June 2015

Rastamouse is a stop-motion animated musical children's TV series created by Genevieve Webster and Michael De Souza and produced by Dinamo Productions, Three Stones Media/The Rastamouse Company and DHX Media (now WildBrain) for CBeebies. The show follows crime-busting anthro mouse reggae band Da Easy Crew, who split their time between making music and solving mysteries for the President of Mouseland.

The first 52 episodes of the original series were shown in the lunch hour starting on 31 January 2011 on CBeebies, a UK BBC channel. From 7 March 2011, the programme was repeated in the early mornings, on BBC2. The second series, comprising a further 26 episodes, began on 20 August 2012. The third series, comprising the final 26 episodes, began on CBeebies 23 March 2015.

== Characters ==
The series features an all-mouse reggae band, Rastamouse and Da Easy Crew, who play music at the 'Nuff Song Studio' when they're not solving mysteries for the President of Mouseland. All the characters speak with a Jamaican accent.

Main

- Rastamouse: Crime fighting mouse and lead guitar player for Da Easy Crew. Always knows how to "make a bad ting good." His catchphrase is "Irie, man!"
- Scratchy: DJ and bass player for Da Easy Crew. Her catchphrases are "Sweet!" and "You know what I'm saying!"
- Zoomer: Speediest mouse in Mouseland, bongo player in Da Easy Crew. His catchphrase is "Aww, man!"
- Gladstone the Rhino: rhino who Rastamouse often rides.

Other

- Wensley Dale: President of Mouseland. He calls Da Easy Crew on his handheld radio when there's a mystery that needs solving. His name is a parody of Wensleydale.
- Bagga T: Hip-hop rapper mouse who looks after the orphanage. His catchphrase is "Me name's Bagga T, double trouble, double G!”.
- Missy D: Dancer. Runs the dance studio.
- Bandulu: Expert chef mouse who cooks at the orphanage. His specialty is cheese pies.
- Fats: Mechanic who runs Fats' 4x4 Garage.
- Mixie: Bagga T's cousin and beatboxer.
- Natty Kass: Super stylish fashion designer.
- Sasha: Wensley Dale's older sister. She's super tidy, but a little bit bossy.
- Frank: Wensley Dale's nephew. He's a skateboarding artist mouse, who's a bit clumsy and stutters.
- Aunt Janessa: Wensley Dale's aunt. Singer who runs the Mouseland Choir.
- Lil' Patch: Operates Mouseland's best-known radio station, 'For Real FM'.
- Super: Owns and runs a supermarket.
- Half Pint: Delivery mouse.
- Ron: The Grovetown barber.
- Stylus: Owns the record store.
- Toots: Lead singer of The Mousetails.
- Ice Popp: Rapper and Toots' roadie.
- Orphans: Baby mice who live in the orphanage.
- Spike Cheez: World's best-known filmmaker and director

== Cast (voice actors) ==
- Rastamouse: Reggie Yates
- Scratchy: Sharon Duncan-Brewster
- Zoomer: William Vanderpuye
- President Wensley Dale: Cornell John
- Bagga T. and Gladstone the Rhino Lenny Henry

== Origins ==
The character Rastamouse first appeared in 2004 in the children's books Rastamouse and the Crucial Plan and Rastamouse Da Bag-a Bling. A third book, Rastamouse and the Double-Crossin' Diva, was published in 2005. The stories were co-written by Genevieve Webster, an author and illustrator, and Michael De Souza, a Rastafarian swimming instructor. They are written in rhyme and contain a Caribbean accent and some Jamaican Patois terms. A pop song, "Ice Popp", was released in 2011.

Lenny Henry read two of the stories, The Crucial Plan and Da Bag-a Bling, for the BBC's Jackanory Junior, which was first shown in January 2008.

== Ethos ==
The stories emphasise the importance of solving problems through mutual understanding, love and respect, without resorting to punishment. Rastamouse's ethos is redemption and not retribution—"make a bad ting good"—helping wrong-doers to redeem themselves from their mistakes. Meaning good things can come from bad things.

== Music ==
Rastamouse and Da Easy Crew's album Makin' A Bad Ting Good was released by EMI in July 2011. It includes the single "Ice Popp". A full second album of original music, Best Friends, was released by the Demon Music Group sublabel Little Demon on 24 June 2016. The lead single of the album was "Mi Love Mi Music". All music for the series was composed by Andrew Kingslow. The theme tune was sung by Martin "Sugar" Merchant, former singer in the rock/reggae band Audioweb. Reggae with medium to heavy bass.

== Puppets ==
The puppets were made by Mackinnon and Saunders, who previously made the puppets for Bob the Builder, Postman Pat and Tim Burton's Corpse Bride.

== Critical reception ==
There was early speculation in the British media that the Rastamouse cheese was an allusion to marijuana, despite actual cheese being shown in the series.

The Voice, a newspaper that serves the British African-Caribbean community, welcomed the show, albeit as a stereotype of Jamaican life: a The Voice website poll showed that over 60% considered it to be a positive programme. Digital Spy commented that the BBC said that "Rastamouse is not racist". The Guardian newspaper gave a differing view of Rastamouse, with the producer Greg Boardman stating that the producers "never intentionally put in innuendo or anything that isn't age-appropriate".

Figures provided by broadcast regulator Ofcom indicate that the animated TV show received 12 complaints in 2011, though none of them were upheld. The BBC described Rastamouse, aimed at children under six, as one of its most popular shows of 2011.

The series was nominated for the British Academy Children's Award for Pre-School Animation twice, in 2011 and 2012.

== Episodes ==
=== Series 1 (2011) ===
Title	Plot	Rastamouse.com running order	Original UK airdate
"Da Crucial Plan"	Da Easy Crew devise a clever plan to discover who has stolen all the cheese in Mouseland.	1	31 January 2011
"Bakin' and Breakin'"	Rastamouse teaches some tasty dance moves to solve a problem at the orphanage.	3	1 February 2011
"Da Missin Masterpiece"	Da Easy Crew must come up with a plan to track down a missing masterpiece.	4	2 February 2011
"For Real FM"	Da Easy Crew track down a mystery pirate who has taken all the music in mouseland.	5	3 February 2011
"Mice Camera Action"	Director Spike Cheez arrives in town and makes every mouse go crazy for his new pirate movie.	6	4 February 2011
"Hot Hot Hot"	Da Easy Crew must arrange a surprise party to track down a very selfish mouse.	7	7 February 2011
"President's Pie"	A thief has taken a special pie Bandulu baked for Wensley Dale.	8	8 February 2011
"Wicked Threads"	Somebody steals Wensley Dale's presidential tie during the island fashion competition.	13	9 February 2011
"Da Marathon Mystery"	Rastamouse wonders if Rubba is cheating to win the Da Big Cheese Marathon.	14	10 February 2011
"Da Cool Cruiser"	Rastamouse must apprehend a motorised thief who is determined to win at all costs.	15	11 February 2011
"Da Monstrous Fib"	Scary sounds have been spooking the orphanage mice during their camping trip.	16	14 February 2011
"Cheesy Rumbles"	Da Easy Crew investigate strange rumbling sounds in the Buff Bay Caves.	17	15 February 2011
"Boom Bada Boom"	Rastamouse and Scratchy investigate why everyone in Grove Town is so keen to snooze.	11	16 February 2011
"Da Ice Cold Criminal"	Rastamouse tracks down a thief with an icy ambition.	19	17 February 2011
"Sole Rebel"	Zoomer, Rubba and Dub are devastated when their brand new sneakers fall apart.	22	18 February 2011
"Double Crossin' Diva"	A missing minibus and a talent show trip. Rastamouse must judge who is breaking the rules.	2	14 March 2011
"Toots Re-routes"	Someone prevents a musical legend from performing at Gladstone Brie's music festival.	9	15 March 2011
"Da Bag A Bling"	Rastamouse instigates an ingenious plan to catch a person who has borrowed the orphans.	24	16 March 2011
"Pie Without Cheese"	Wensley Dale's bossy sister Sasha takes over when he goes on vacation.	18	17 March 2011
"Hot Sauce"	Da Easy Crew have a 'hot' plan to bring about order and save the food festival.	23	18 March 2011
"Rollin' Ragga Twins"	The crew stage a roller disco "skatin' competition" in order to trick a copycat thief.	12	21 March 2011
"Shorty Shapes Up"	It is Sports Day and there are 'blingy medals' to be won, but a mouse spoils all the fun.	10	22 March 2011
"Master of Disguise"	Da Easy Crew comes up with a watertight plan to fix a leaky roof.	20	23 March 2011
"Lady Uptown"	Old school music star Lady Uptown is distressed by the disappearance of her lucky brooch.	21	24 March 2011
"Sugacube"	Somebody has stolen an Easy Crew record and is now pretending the music is their own.	25	25 March 2011
"Da Rhyming Teef"	Da Easy Crew put aside their music making to track down the President's stolen stereo.	26	28 March 2011
"Missing Da Prez"	Flat tyres, abandoned limos and a missing Wensley Dale: Rastamouse prepares a premier plan to fix a presidential favour.	27	11 July 2011
"Da Swinging Suspect"	There's a mystery mouse leaving a nutty trail of mayhem in his wake.	28	12 July 2011
"Swap Til Ya Drop"	Rastamouse comes up with a crafty plan to catch a 'card cravin' criminal'.	29	13 July 2011
"Ready Read"	Da Easy Crew come up with a powerful plan to prove that reading really rocks.	30	14 July 2011
"Da Rubbish Playground"	Wensley Dale is trapped inside his mansion unable to do the things that Presidents' do. Da Easy Crew must get out there and stop a messy mouse dumping rubbish all over the island.	31	15 July 2011
"Where da Hair?"	Aunt Janessa's lost her best wig, but Da Easy Crew are on the case.	32	18 July 2011
"Da Rare Groove"	Da Easy Crew follow a wicked beat to help Wensley Dale set a rare groove free.	33	19 July 2011
"S'no Flour"	The first snow is about to fall in Mouseland, but Da Easy Crew are too busy investigating all the missing flour to join in the fun.	34	20 July 2011
"Message in a Bottle"	Someone's sending out an S.O.S as the crucial jams of For Real FM fall silent.	35	21 July 2011
"Hand Made Music"	The Little Orphans wake up to find that all their toys are gone.	36	22 July 2011
"Natty Hill Carnival"	Will Rastamouse and Da Easy Crew be able to save Carnival?	37	29 August 2011
"Rappers Block"	Da Easy Crew must track down Bagga T and help him find his rap.	38	17 October 2011
"Kharma"	Da Easy Crew come up with an open-top plan to catch a double-decker thief.	39	18 October 2011
"Perfec' Pizza"	Da Easy Crew are helping to put prize-winning pizzas on the menu.	40	19 October 2011
"Stumped"	Da Easy Crew learn that when it comes to cricket, Dwain, the post mouse, is the expert.	41	20 October 2011
"Hot off Da Press"	Da Easy Crew investigate the President's missing speech, while a new comic captivates Mouseland with adventures of 'Super Zoomer'.	42	21 October 2011
"Mice Cool Musical"	Missy D and Scratchy are both coaching the orphans in their musical, but who will guarantee that it's a sure-fire smash-hit?	43	24 October 2011
"Zoomer Slows Down"	A thin-crust clue and a familiar tune help Rastamouse and Scratchy get Zoomer ready for the big skate race.	44	25 October 2011
"MJ Meddles"	There's gonna be a slam dunking basketball contest tonight at Pow Pow Square.	45	26 October 2011
"No Fix Fats"	Things are breaking down all over Mouseland but Fats is nowhere to be found. Da Easy Crew race to fix everything in time for the 'Summer Party' and find out if Fats is okay.	46	27 October 2011
"Mouse Measles"	The 'Great Big Sponsored Skate' is approaching and Da Easy Crew find a way for everyone to participate.	47	28 October 2011
"Mouse Space Mystery"	Wensley Dale is planning a special treat for the Little Orphans, but one hi-tech thief just might derail his plan.	48	31 October 2011
"Sandy Bay Boyz"	There are three mice missing and three missing mic's. Da Easy Crew must come up with a real smooth plan to find the Sandy Bay Boyz.	49	1 November 2011
"Black Whiskers"	Wensley calls in Da Easy Crew for a serious problem—the Jammin' Dodger's gone missing.	50	2 November 2011
"Da Great Spindiski"	When President Wensley Dale sits down for breakfast he can't eat a thing—the President's plate's gone missing.	51	3 November 2011
"Tinie Tinsel"	While Mouseland waits for some real snow to fall Da Easy Crew must find a mouse who has been distracted by a celebration of lovin' and carin'.	52	14 December 2011

=== Series 2 (2012) ===
Title	Plot	Rastamouse.com running order	Original UK airdate
"Eyes Popp"	Rastamouse comes up with an original plan to show Ice Popp that being different can be cool.	53	20 August 2012
"Mouserobics"	Da Easy Crew discover a cheeky mouse who's dreamed up a distracting plan to premier his own uptempo grooves on For Real FM.	54	21 August 2012
"Grovetown"	The Easy Crew are thrilled when Wensley Dale asks them to escort ragga star, Miss Ruffit, around Grovetown ahead of her bib concert gig.	55	22 August 2012
"Show Band Style"	Dexter and the orphans are showing off bare skills, while Bandulu and Bagga T have a falling-out.	56	23 August 2012
"Chatterbox"	Scratchy and Zoomer give Da Prez some singing lessons while Rastamouse thinks up a plan to find out why Janessa keeps losing her voice.	57	24 August 2012
"Boom Box Bust"	Da Easy Crew have composed a new song for Wensley Dale's charity record, but there's just one problem; the Prez nah like it one bit!	58	27 August 2012
"Wicked Wednesday"	President Wensley Dale's looking after the orphans, cos Bandulu is feeling unwell, but when sister Sasha takes charge all the plans go awry.	59	26 November 2012
"Over Da Moon"	Everyone's excited about the prospect of a journey into space, but Da Easy Crew keep their feet on the ground as they investigate a bunch of missing things.	60	28 August 2012
"Book Ah Records"	Rastamouse hatches a master plan to track down some missing mice and solve a cheesy mystery in time to break some new Mouseland records.	61	29 August 2012
"Da Winner Is"	Da Easy Crew follow a golden paint trail to track down a fame-obsessed mouse.	62	30 August 2012
"Da Mashup Mystery"	Mashed up messages and mixed up instructions result in a proper mess that means Stylee's Summer Jam might have to be cancelled.	63	27 November 2012
"Rappin' Da Spell"	Rastamouse must come up with a system to make sure the orphans become star spellers.	64	14 September 2012
"Dude Where's Mi Bongo's"	Zoomer's lost his bongo's, and Da Easy Crew race to find them before their gig at Wensley Dale's Garden Party.	65	28 November 2012
"Chococheese"	There's a new snack sensation taking Grovetown by storm. The problem is it tastes dreadful, and nobody knows who has been making it.	66	29 November 2012
"Beyond Da Fringe"	There's a queue outside Ron's barbers waiting for haircuts, but Ron is nowhere to be found!	67	30 November 2012
"Bad Ting Song"	Wensley Dale's been practicing his golf for the annual competition, but he can't understand why he keeps getting worse and worse!	68	3 December 2012
"Mouseland TV Cribs"	Wensley Dale's supposed to be attending an interview with the rapper Fifty P, but a series of strange goings on means he doesn't know if he has time.	69	4 December 2012
"Da King's Speech"	Rastamouse has a perfect performance plan to deal with a serious case of stage fright.	70	5 December 2012
"Da Lost Keys"	World-famous piano virtuoso Oscar paws is coming to Grovetown to perform a brand new tune, but someone seems determined to disrupt the premiere performance.	71	6 December 2012
"Safe"	Rastamouse must come up with a safe, sound, and priceless plan to fix a Mouseland banking crisis.	72	7 December 2012
"Uptown Feelin' Down"	Wensley Dale's concerned when Lady Uptown misses the orphans' singing lesson.	73	10 December 2012
"Sherlock Homie"	There's a new crime bustin' mouse in town so Wensley Dale's got no qualms about giving Da Easy Crew the day off.	74	11 December 2012
"Mousetamind"	Wensley Dale's been so busy he hasn't had time to prepare the questions for the Big Mouseland Quiz, and when he finally has time to hit the books he discovers his bookshelves are totally bare!	75	12 December 2012
"Didier du Rag"	All of the mice in Grovetown are on the lookout for a new footie tricks champion, but all the footballs in Mouseland are missing.	76	13 December 2012
"Abracada Bredda"	Only Zoomer's noticed Sonny's weather forecast, so when Da Easy Crew are called to investigate a series of missing objects it's Zoomer who works out what's happened.	77	14 December 2012
"Da Sugamice"	Scratchy is convinced she's discovered a wicked new girl band to represent Grovetown in this year's battle of the bands.	78	19 December 2012

=== Series 3 (2015) ===
Title	Plot	Rastamouse.com running order	Original UK airdate
"Da Mousa Lisa"	Wensley Dale has bought a very rare painting online but he can't work out why such an old painting would still be wet. Scratchy instantly recognises the painting, it's the famous Mousa Lisa, but she too is troubled; the Mousa Lisa seems to have developed a frown! Da Easy Crew must find who delivered the picture and work out why the valuable old painting no longer looks like it's supposed to.	79	23 March 2015
"Techno Time"	The President engages the crew to track down missing mice and get them to the meeting on schedule. But when Da Easy Crew discover that a lot of mice are using Geekamouse's brand new, super-stylish 'Techno' watches they realise that these fancy new 'smart' watches are not that smart after all!	80	24 March 2015
"Da Rollin' Cheese"	It's the big food festival and Wensley Dale is struggling to finalise all the preparations and hasn't even thought up a name for the event yet. Scratchy and Zoomer volunteer to help transport Bandulu's cheese pies but they fail to show up at the food festival site. Rastamouse must investigate, discovering Scratchy, Zoomer and a crowd of mice pushing and pulling at a broken down truck that's blocking the bridge at Misty Falls.	81	25 March 2015
"Count on Me"	Black Whiskers and Lil' Patch are taking the orphans on a special treasure hunt, pirate party but when the orphans and Black Whiskers fail to show up at the 'spot marked X' in time for their picnic, Da Easy Crew must investigate.	82	26 March 2015
"Dancinderella"	Lady Uptown is auditioning for a new backing dancer for her stage show.	83	27 March 2015
"Night at the Mouseum"	Da Easy Crew investigate unusual noises and mysterious sights at Da Mouseland Museum and on the way uncover plenty of facts about Mouseland history!	84	30 March 2015
"Club Cheese"	Zoomer's distracted by a new computer game called 'Club Cheese'; meanwhile, Rastamouse is concerned that he hasn't heard from 'the Prez' in quite a while. When Da Easy Crew visit the presidential mansion to check in on Wensley Dale there's no answer.	85	31 March 2015
"Da Bagga Bard"	Spike Cheez is shooting his latest epic movie based on an old play by the most famous Williamouse Da Bard but when Spike discovers the final pages of the play are missing Wensley calls on Da Easy Crew.	86	1 April 2015
"Da Special One"	Coach Jose's workin' proper hard, "gettin' da volleyball team up to scratch." But at practice today "da team nah show up" and Wensley's worried they're gonna have to cancel their next match!	87	2 April 2015
"Da Bad Break"	Frank's hoping to have much fun with his new street dance group, the Fresh Style Crew, but no one has shown up for rehearsal. Frank can't work out why and is sad that even his best friend Dexter has given up. Da Easy Crew investigate but all Frank's friends seem a little bit evasive.	88	3 April 2015
"Da Rollin Stone"	Chaka Overdub, the world-famous reggae star, has arrived at the Presidential Mansion and is receiving the megastar treatment from Gladstone Brie but when he disappears into the garden the President is extremely concerned.	89	6 April 2015
"Discovery Day"	Professor Branston's supposed to be organising 'Discovery Day' for da likkle orphans but he hasn't shown up. As the Easy Crew investigate they come across various mice excited by strange goings on in the woods. Could it be Mouseland has a visitor from outer space? Papa might have a clue that could help work out "whaa gwaan?"	90	7 April 2015
"Sugar Gone Sour"	The President is waiting to hear the brand new track from Da Sugamice but RT, the band's manager, isn't answering Wensley's call. When the Easy Crew investigate they discover the band have broken up and will not play anymore. Scratchy is saddened by the news but can Rastamouse come up with a sweet-talking plan to get the band working together once more.	91	8 April 2015
"Bare Thrills"	A world-famous adventure mouse is coming to Mouseland to film TV special with President Wensley Dale but when Sasha can't find Wensley at the campsite in the woods she summons the Easy Crew to track down her brother.	92	9 April 2015
"Hot Wheels"	Branston has invented a pedal-powered, juicycle juice bike for da likkle orphan nice but it's not working. Da Easy Crew investigate and discover a mouse who is desperate to flip slide and ride in the big skate park skills contest. Can Rastamouse come up with a plan to get the likkle orphan mice consuming their five-a-day juice smoothies?	93	10 April 2015
"Ride on Time"	The President's feeling under the weather but is still excited about Super's new online delivery service where you order all your groceries on the computer and get them delivered straight to ya door! There's just one problem, customers are complaining that the groceries are going missing!	94	1 June 2015
"Trainin' Day"	Coach Jose's missing his referees whistle. Dwayne the postmouse has lost his hat and Frank's not having much fun because he's lost his lucky ping pong bat.	95	2 June 2015
"Da Mouseland Cheese Hunt"	Chocofella has been organising the annual Mouseland Cheese Hunt but the event is about to start and no one can find Chocofella or the list of instructions for the participants.	96	3 June 2015
"Rainin' Cheese"	Zoomer can't believe it—it's raining cheese in Mouseland! Meanwhile, Super's missing a delivery, Natty Kass has lost some hats and the likkle orphans have no tennis balls.	97	4 June 2015
"Mo Mo Goes Solo"	Oscar Paws' nephew, Mo Mo is due to be doing a big solo at the Mouseland Proms Concert. The youngest mouse ever to play a concert all on his own, Mo Mo seems more interested in spending time on the beach playing volleyball. When Mo Mo disappears from rehearsal the Easy Crew must work out 'whaa gwaan'.	98	5 June 2015
"Pump Up Da Volume"	Mixie believes that some mouse has stolen all the sound to Spike Cheez's latest TV show. Wensley Dale summons the Easy Crew to find the missing sound urgently so that Spike can show off his new movie creation on Mouseland Squeakies, the President's brand new TV-channel for young mice.	99	8 June 2015
"GoldieVox & Da Easy Crew"	Wensley Dale's trying to craft a National Anthem for the Mouseland Centenary Celebrations but he's been so busy organising he's run out of inspiration. While Wensley concentrates on his Mouseland Anthem, Da Easy Crew lend a hand by visiting all the mice who are getting ready for the big event but soon discover that nothing's going to plan.	100	9 June 2015
"Da Last Resort"	Some mouse has put up a big fence and is doing a whole lot of building on da beach! No one can get to Mousetego Bay and the poor likkle orphans are being prevented from having fun. Da Easy Crew must investigate a mystery mouse with selfish ambitions and Rastamouse must come up with a clever plan to make sure that Mouseland remains the happiest place in the world!	101	10 June 2015
"Makin' a Bad Ting Good as New"	More priceless than blinging diamonds and more important than a famous painting; something very precious has gone missing from the President's Mansion and Frank, Wensley's nephew, is most upset. Da Easy Crew must take a tour of Mouseland to solve this mystery.	102	11 June 2015
"School of Rock"	Bandulu's fretting because the orphans seem to be making noise rather than concentrating on their lessons. Wensley Dale has sent them a new highly qualified teacher so he's perplexed about what's going wrong.	103	12 June 2015
"CheezAid"	Through the generosity of mice there are needy mice all over the world who will benefit from this massive CheezAid gig. Sir Alfie's organised for gig to be broadcast live on TV, but where are Scratchy and Zoomer? This is one concert they are not going to want to miss!	104	15 June 2015

== Live performances ==
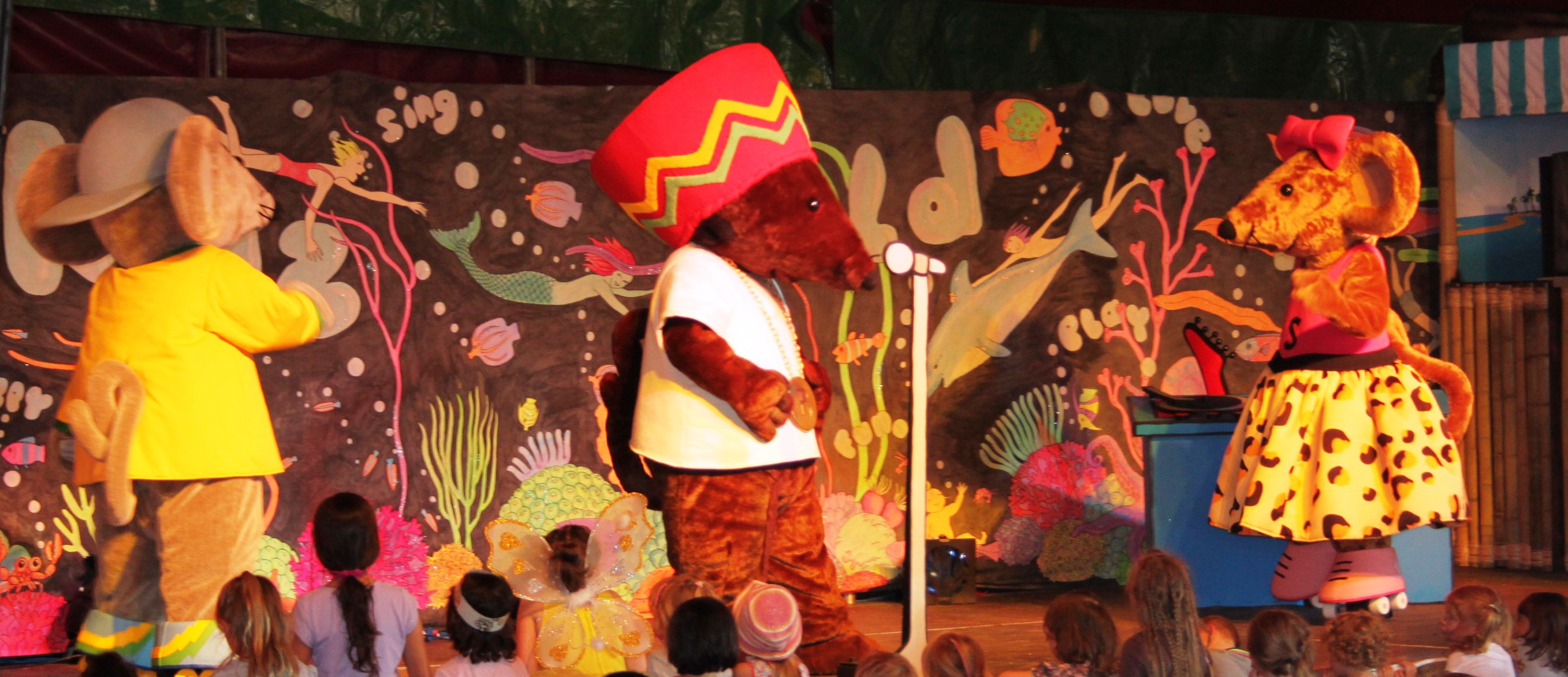
Rastamouse at the 2011 Glastonbury Festival

In June 2011, Rastamouse performed a series of shows in the Kidz Field at Glastonbury Festival.

They also performed in 2011 on the ITV morning show Daybreak.

On 13 March 2015, Rastamouse & Da Easy Crew took part in Dermot's Day of Dance for Red Nose Day 2015.

== All Tings Rastamouse Shop ==
On 28 February 2015, the world's first official Rastamouse shop was opened by co-author Michael de Souza, in Peckham, South London.
