= Grant Orchard =

British animation director and designer

Grant Orchard is a British animation director and designer who lives and works in London.

== Career ==
Orchard is best known for being the creator of the CBeebies series Hey Duggee. Based at Studio AKA, he has created many spots for a wide range of clients. On 24 January 2012, he was nominated for an Academy Award for the animated short film A Morning Stroll.

== Personal life ==
Orchard was born in West London and has two sons. He studied animation at the University for the Creative Arts and graduated in 1995. He is a fan of Crystal Palace.
