= British Academy Children's Awards =

British awards ceremony for children's media

- Current: British Academy Children's Awards 2022
- Awarded for: The best in media directed to children and young people.
- Country: United Kingdom
- First award: 1996
- Final award: 2022
- Website: www.bafta.org/awards/childrens/

The British Academy Children's Awards were an annual award show hosted by the British Academy of Film and Television Arts (BAFTA). They were awarded annually from 1996, before then they were a part of the main British Academy Television Awards. Categories included those for television productions, feature films and video games.

The final ceremony, the 25th British Academy Children's Awards, was held on 27 November 2022, at Old Billingsgate in London, and was hosted by television presenter Lindsey Russell. The ceremony marked the return of the awards after a three-year absence due to the COVID-19 pandemic. In September 2023, BAFTA discontinued the children's awards, citing a decline in entries and engagement, with new categories for children's content introduced in the film, games and television award ceremonies in 2025.

== History ==
The awards were first presented in 1996, and the awards was presented annually, with the exception 2020 and 2021, where the awards were cancelled due to the COVID-19 pandemic. Prior to 1996, productions targeted to children or young audiences were included in the British Academy Television Awards, from 1983 to 1996, two children-oriented categories, Children's Programme – Factual and Children's Programme – Fiction or Entertainment were presented. The last winners for those categories before the children's awards ceremony was created were CBBC's programme Short Change for the former and television movie Coping with Christmas for the latter.

The first edition featured seven competitive categories (Animation, Drama, Entertainment, Factual, Pre-School, Schools - Documentary, Schools - Drama), along with two special awards, one for film producer John Coates and the other for Lewis Rudd, who was head to the children's programming for ITV. The number of categories varied through the editions with the creation of several categories such as International and Feature Film, both in 1999, Pre-School Animation and Presenter, both in 2000, and Game in 2007, among others. Until 2016, the awards also presented categories voted by the public through online voting, these included categories for feature film, television, video game and website.

== Categories ==
In the final ceremony in 2022, the following fourteen competitive categories were presented:

- Animation
- Feature Film
- Pre-School – Animation
- Pre-School – Live Action
- Non-Scripted
- International
- Content for Change
- Game
- Scripted
- Game
- Performer
- Young Performer
- Director
- Writer

== Awards winners ==
=== Animation ===
- 1996: Gogs
- 1997: Yr Enwog Ffred
- 1999: The First Snow of Winter
- 2000: Foxbusters
- 2001: Animated Tales of the World: Aunt Tiger
- 2002: The English Programme: Sir Gawain and the Green Knight
- 2003: Bob the Builder: A Christmas to Remember
- 2004: Brush Head
- 2005: The Little Reindeer
- 2006: The Amazing Adrenalini Brothers
- 2007: The Secret Show
- 2008: Charlie and Lola: Autumn Special
- 2009: Lost and Found
- 2010: Shaun the Sheep
- 2011: The Amazing World of Gumball
- 2012: The Amazing World of Gumball
- 2013: Room on the Broom
- 2014: The Amazing World of Gumball
- 2015: Shaun the Sheep
- 2016: The Amazing World of Gumball
- 2017: Revolting Rhymes
- 2019: Hilda
- 2022: The Snail and the Whale

=== Performer ===
- 2010: Jim Howick (Horrible Histories)
- 2011: Harley Bird (Peppa Pig)
- 2012: Khalil Madovi (4 O'Clock Club)
- 2013: Bobby Lockwood (Wolfblood)
- 2014 Cherry Campbell (Katie Morag)
- 2015: Jessica Ransom (Horrible Histories)
- 2016: Nick James (Hank Zipzer)
- 2017: Alhaji Fofana (Screwball!)
- 2018: Tom Courtenay (Grandpa's Great Escape)
- 2019: Emily Burnett (The Dumping Ground)
- 2022: Chris O'Dowd (Here We Are: Notes for Living on Planet Earth)

=== Young Performer ===
- 2018: Chloe Lea (Katy)
- 2019: Bella Ramsey (The Worst Witch)
- 2022: Taiya Samuel: (JoJo & Gran Gran)

=== Pre-School ===
==== Animation ====
- 2000: Maisy
- 2001: Animal Stories
- 2002: Eddy and the Bear
- 2003: Hilltop Hospital
- 2004: Yoko! Jakamoko! Toto!
- 2005: Peppa Pig
- 2006: Pocoyo
- 2007: Charlie and Lola
- 2008: Charlie and Lola
- 2009: Ben & Holly's Little Kingdom
- 2010: Timmy Time
- 2011: Peppa Pig
- 2012: Peppa Pig
- 2013: Timmy Time
- 2014: Sarah & Duck
- 2015: Clangers
- 2016: Hey Duggee
- 2017: Hey Duggee
- 2018: Hey Duggee
- 2019: Numberblocks
- 2022: Hey Duggee

==== Live Action ====
- 2000: Tweenies
- 2001: Jim Henson's The Hoobs
- 2002: Teletubbies Everywhere
- 2003: Ripley and Scuff
- 2004: Balamory
- 2005: Boogie Beebies
- 2006: CBeebies Springwatch
- 2007: In the Night Garden...
- 2008: In the Night Garden...
- 2009: Bookaboo
- 2010: Something Special
- 2011: Bookaboo
- 2012: Justin's House
- 2013: CBeebies Ugly Duckling
- 2014: Old Jack's Boat
- 2015: Old Jack's Boat
- 2016: Topsy and Tim
- 2017: Our Family
- 2018: Get Well Soon
- 2019: Ferne and Rory's Vet Tales
- 2022: Lovely Little Farm

=== Presenter ===
- 2000: Katy Hill
- 2001: Cat Deeley (SMTV Live)
- 2002: Matt Baker (Blue Peter)
- 2003: Matt Baker (Blue Peter)
- 2004: Richard McCourt and Dominic Wood (Dick & Dom in da Bungalow)
- 2005: Michaela Strachan (Michaela's Wild Challenge)
- 2006: Holly Willoughby (Holly & Stephen's Saturday Showdown)
- 2007: Barney Harwood (Smile)
- 2008: Justin Fletcher (Something Special)
- 2009: Richard Hammond (Richard Hammond's Blast Lab)
- 2010: Justin Fletcher (Something Special)
- 2011: Steve Backshall (Deadly 60)
- 2012: Justin Fletcher (Something Special)
- 2013: Sam Nixon and Mark Rhodes (Sam & Mark's Big Friday Wind-Up)
- 2014: Richard McCourt and Dominic Wood (Absolute Genius with Dick and Dom)
- 2015: Sam Nixon and Mark Rhodes (Sam & Mark's Big Christmas Wind-Up)
- 2016: Iain Stirling (The Dog Ate My Homework)
- 2017: Maddie Moate (Do You Know?)
- 2018: Justin Fletcher (Something Special)
- 2019: Lindsey Russell (Blue Peter)
- 2022: George Webster (CBeebies)

=== Writer ===
- 2000: Richard Carpenter and Helen Cresswell
- 2001: Roy Apps
- 2002: Peter Tabern (Stig of the Dump)
- 2003: Alex Williams (Sir Gadabout: The Worst Knight in the Land)
- 2006: Peter Tabern (Johnny and the Bomb)
- 2007: Bridget Hurst (Charlie and Lola)
- 2008: Alison Hume (Summerhill)
- 2009: Helen Blakeman (Dustbin Baby)
- 2010: Writing team (Horrible Histories)
- 2011: James Lamont and Jon Foster (Shaun the Sheep)
- 2012: James Lamont and Jon Foster (Shaun the Sheep)
- 2013: Writing team (The Amazing World of Gumball)
- 2014: Debbie Moon (Wolfblood)
- 2015: Guy Burt (Harriet's Army)
- 2016: Writing team (The Amazing World of Gumball)
- 2017: Adam Tyler (Screwball!)
- 2018: Tom Bidwell (Katy)
- 2019: Writing team (The Amazing World of Gumball)
- 2022: Joe Markham, Mic Graves and Tony Hull (The Amazing World of Gumball)

=== Director ===
- 2018: Grant Orchard (Hey Duggee)
- 2019: Dirk Campbell (The Worst Witch)
- 2022: Max Lang, Daniel Snaddon (The Snail and the Whale)

=== International ===
- 1999: Thunderstone
- 2000: Pablo the Little Red Fox
- 2001: Teacher's Pet
- 2002: Even Stevens
- 2003: Arthur
- 2004: 8 Simple Rules for Dating My Teenage Daughter
- 2005: Jakers! The Adventures of Piggley Winks
- 2006: LazyTown
- 2007: SpongeBob SquarePants
- 2008: Yo Gabba Gabba!
- 2009: The Penguins of Madagascar
- 2010: The Penguins of Madagascar
- 2011: Fish Hooks
- 2012: SpongeBob SquarePants
- 2013: Adventure Time
- 2014: Adventure Time
- 2015: Gravity Falls
- 2016: We Bare Bears
- 2017: SpongeBob SquarePants
- 2018: SpongeBob SquarePants
- 2019: Teen Titans Go!
- 2022: Bluey

=== Feature Film ===
- 1999: Paulie
- 2000: The Iron Giant
- 2001: Shrek
- 2002: Monsters, Inc.
- 2003: Whale Rider
- 2004: Harry Potter and the Prisoner of Azkaban
- 2005: The Incredibles
- 2006: Wallace & Gromit: The Curse of the Were-Rabbit
- 2007: Happy Feet
- 2008: WALL-E
- 2009: Coraline
- 2010: Up
- 2011: Harry Potter and the Deathly Hallows – Part 2
- 2012: The Hunger Games
- 2013: Life of Pi
- 2014: The Lego Movie
- 2015: Paddington
- 2016: Zootopia
- 2017: The Little Prince
- 2018: Paddington 2
- 2019: Spider-Man: Into the Spider-Verse
- 2022: Wolfwalkers

=== Game ===
- 2007: Buzz! Junior: Jungle Party
- 2008: Lego Batman: The Videogame
- 2009: LittleBigPlanet
- 2010: Rabbids Go Home
- 2011: Lego Pirates of the Caribbean: The Video Game
- 2012: Skylanders: Spyro's Adventure
- 2013: Skylanders: Giants
- 2014: Mario Kart 8
- 2015: Splatoon
- 2016: Lego Dimensions
- 2017: Pokémon Go
- 2018: Mario + Rabbids Kingdom Battle
- 2019: Astro Bot Rescue Mission
- 2022: Sackboy: A Big Adventure

=== Scripted ===
- 2022: Dodger

=== Non-Scripted ===
- 2022: FYI Ukraine Invasion Special

=== Content for Change ===
- 2022: El Deafo

=== Special Award ===
- 1996: John Coates and Lewis Rudd
- 1997: Anna Home
- 1999: The Jim Henson Company
- 2000: Anne Wood
- 2001: Grange Hill
- 2002: Peter Orton and Ronald Smedley
- 2003: Christopher Grace
- 2004: Floella Benjamin
- 2005: The Junior Television Workshop
- 2006: Nigel Pickard
- 2007: Mick Robertson
- 2008: Barry Elliott and Paul Elliott
- 2009: Bernard Cribbins
- 2010: Brian Cant
- 2011: Newsround
- 2012: Brian Cosgrove
- 2013: Biddy Baxter
- 2014: Peter Firmin
- 2015: Jocelyn Stevenson
- 2016: Peter Western
- 2017: Jacqueline Wilson
- 2018: Clive Juster
- 2019: Nikki Lilly

=== Channel of the Year ===
- 2006: CBeebies
- 2007: Nickelodeon
- 2008: CBBC
- 2009: Nick Jr.
- 2010: CBeebies
- 2011: CBeebies
- 2012: CBBC
- 2013: CBeebies
- 2014: Cartoon Network
- 2015: CBBC
- 2016: CBeebies
- 2017: TrueTube
- 2018: CBeebies
- 2019: CBeebies

=== Comedy ===
- 2010: Horrible Histories
- 2011: Horrible Histories
- 2012: Horrible Histories
- 2013: Horrible Histories
- 2014: Diddy Movies
- 2015: Gigglebiz
- 2016: Horrible Histories: Sensational Shakespeare
- 2017: Class Dismissed
- 2018: So Awkward
- 2019: Horrible Histories

=== Drama ===
- 1996: Coping with Christmas
- 1999: Microsoap
- 2000: Pig Heart Boy
- 2001: Custer's Last Stand-up
- 2002: Jeopardy
- 2003: Bootleg
- 2004: Feather Boy
- 2005: My Life as a Popat
- 2006: The Giblet Boys
- 2007: That Summer Day
- 2008: The Revenge Files of Alistair Fury
- 2009: Rhestr Nadolig Wil
- 2010: Tracy Beaker Returns
- 2011: Just William
- 2012: Roy
- 2013: The Dumping Ground
- 2014: Katie Morag
- 2015: Katie Morag
- 2016: Refugee
- 2017: Like Me
- 2018: Joe All Alone
- 2019: Creeped Out

=== Entertainment ===
- 1996: The Ant & Dec Show
- 1997: Roger and the Rottentrolls
- 1999: Live & Kicking
- 2000: SMTV Live
- 2001: The Quick Trick Show
- 2002: SMTV Live
- 2003: Raven
- 2004: Dick & Dom in da Bungalow
- 2005: RAD: The Groms Tour America
- 2006: Raven
- 2007: The Slammer
- 2008: Hedz
- 2009: Election
- 2010: Relic: Guardians of the Museum
- 2011: Trapped!
- 2012: Friday Download
- 2013: Help! My Supply Teacher's Magic
- 2014: Junior Bake Off
- 2015: Swashbuckle
- 2016: Sam & Mark's Big Friday Wind-Up
- 2017: Bear Grylls' Survival School
- 2018: Prosiect Z
- 2019: Play Your Pets Right

=== Factual ===
- 1996: Wise Up
- 1997: Wise Up
- 1999: Nick News
- 2000: Newsround Extra: Russian Orphanages
- 2001: Nick News
- 2002: Newsround Extra: Afghanistan
- 2003: Blue Peter: Launch of the Tanzania Water Appeal
- 2004: Serious Desert
- 2005: Serious Arctic
- 2006: Michaela's Wild Challenge
- 2007: Newsround Special: The Wrong Trainers
- 2008: Serious Andes
- 2009: Serious Ocean
- 2010: Newsround Special: Living with Alcohol
- 2011: Deadly 60
- 2012: My Life: Me, My Dad and His Kidney
- 2013: Operation Ouch!
- 2014: Operation Ouch!
- 2015: My Life: I Am Leo
- 2016: My Life: The Boy on the Bicycle
- 2017: Inside My Head: A Newsround Special
- 2018: My Life: Mumbai Street Strikers
- 2019: Finding My Family: Holocaust (Newsround Special)

=== Factual Entertainment ===
- 2019: The Dengineers

=== Short Form ===
- 2006: Purple and Brown
- 2007: Nick's Big Green Thing
- 2008: My Say
- 2009: See Something, Say Something
- 2010: My Favourite Bedtime Story
- 2011: Dipdap
- 2012: Share a Story
- 2013: Share a Story
- 2014: Share a Story
- 2015: OOglies
- 2016: Good as Goaled
- 2017: Share a Story
- 2018: Origins
- 2019: Tee and Mo: Help Our Little World

=== Independent Production Company ===
- 2006: Darrall Macqueen
- 2007: Aardman Animations
- 2008: Ragdoll Productions
- 2009: Astley Baker Davies
- 2010: Kindle Entertainment
- 2011: Kindle Entertainment
- 2012: Blue-Zoo Productions
- 2013: Somethin' Else
- 2014: Kindle Entertainment
- 2015: Somethin' Else
- 2016: Sixteen South
- 2017: Blue-Zoo Productions

=== Interactive ===
==== Original ====
- 2014: Dixi
- 2015: Virry
- 2016: Secret Life of Boys

==== Adapted ====
- 2014: Disney Animated
- 2015: The Dumping Ground: You're the Boss
- 2016: Get Well Soon Hospital with Dr Ranj
- 2017: Hey Duggee: We Love Animals

=== Learning ===
==== Primary ====
- 2006: Mapping Our World
- 2007: Espresso Education: Espresso Primary
- 2008: ArtisanCam
- 2009: Off By Heart
- 2010: L8R
- 2011: Quiff and Boot
- 2012: Seeking Refuge
- 2013: Children Of World War 2
- 2014: Lizard Girl
- 2017: History Bombs: Online History Resources

==== Secondary ====
- 2006: Timelines: Empire
- 2007: Recollection Eyewitnesses: Remembering the Holocaust
- 2008: L8R
- 2009: Troubled Minds
- 2010: Timelines.tv: Smallpox Through Time
- 2011: Privates
- 2012: L8R Youngers 2
- 2013: Just a Few Drinks
- 2014: Poetry: Between the Lines
- 2015: Poetry: Between the Lines
- 2016: Ten Pieces II

=== Pre-School ===
Discontinued in 2000, for separate categories for live-action and animation.

- 1996: Tots TV
- 1997: Tots TV (Lapland Out)
- 1998: Teletubbies
- 1999: Tecwyn Y Tractor

=== Schools: Drama ===
- 1996: Scene: Loved Up
- 1997: Shakespeare Shorts: Romeo And Juliet
- 1999: Junk
- 2000: Dream On
- 2001: ID Citizenship: Beyond The Boundary
- 2002: Scene - Offside
- 2003: Lion Mountain
- 2004: The Illustrated Mum
- 2005: Scene - Oddsquad

=== Schools Factual ===
==== Primary ====
Discontinued in 2006 for Learning: Primary.

- 1999: Rat-A-Tat-Tat: Beans On Toast and Ketchup On Your Cornflakes
- 2000: English Express: Texts - Football
- 2001: Zig Zag - Snapshots: Children In The Second World War
- 2002: Geography Junction: Jamaica - The Coastal Environment
- 2003: Let's Write a Story: Writing Academy
- 2004: Thinking Skills: Think About It - Hiding Places
- 2005: Primary History - Indus Civilisation: Mohenjo-Daro

==== Secondary ====
Discontinued in 2006 for Learning: Secondary.

- 1999: Turning Points: Alcohol Misuse - Emma's Story
- 2000: Lifeschool Sex - Saying it for the Girls
- 2001: The Test Of Time - Forgiveness
- 2002: History File: Britain 1906-1918 - A History In Photographs
- 2003: The English Programme: Film Focus: Animation - Food Commercials
- 2004: In Search of the Tartan Turban
- 2005: School of Hard Knocks

=== Interactive ===
Discontinued in 2014 for separate Interactive categories: Original and Adapted.

- 2002: Tiny Planets
- 2003: Star Ticket Active
- 2004: King Arthur
- 2005: Smile
- 2006: Level Up
- 2007: The Secret Show
- 2008: Bow Street Runner
- 2009: Big & Small
- 2010: ZingZillas
- 2011: Tate Movie Project
- 2012: Nightmare High
- 2013: Moshi Monsters

=== BAFTA Kids' Vote ===
Discontinued in 2009, for separate voting categories for feature film, television, video game and website.

- 1999: Art Attack
- 2000: SMTV Live
- 2001: Disney Channel Kids' Awards 2000
- 2002: SMTV Live
- 2003: Harry Potter and the Chamber of Secrets
- 2004: Shrek 2
- 2005: Charlie and the Chocolate Factory
- 2006: Harry Potter and the Goblet of Fire
- 2007: The Simpsons Movie
- 2008: Hannah Montana

==== Website ====
- 2009: Club Penguin
- 2010: Club Penguin
- 2011: Bin Weevils
- 2012: Bin Weevils
- 2013: Bin Weevils
- 2014: Bin Weevils

==== Feature Film ====
- 2009: Hannah Montana: The Movie
- 2010: Alvin and the Chipmunks: The Squeakquel
- 2011: Harry Potter and the Deathly Hallows – Part 2
- 2012: The Smurfs
- 2013: Despicable Me 2
- 2014: Frozen
- 2015: Minions
- 2016: Zootopia

==== Television ====
- 2009: Hannah Montana
- 2010: Wizards of Waverly Place
- 2011: Good Luck Charlie
- 2012: Good Luck Charlie
- 2013: Jessie
- 2014: Jessie
- 2015: The Next Step
- 2016: The Next Step

==== Video Game ====
- 2009: Wii Sports Resort
- 2010: Just Dance
- 2011: Just Dance 2
- 2012: Temple Run
- 2013: Despicable Me: Minion Rush
- 2014: Minecraft
- 2015: Minecraft
- 2016: Minecraft

=== Writer ===
==== Adapted ====
Discontinued in 2006 for one sole Writer category.

- 2004: Debbie Isitt (The Illustrated Mum)
- 2005: Barbara Cox (Wipe Out)

==== Original ====
Discontinued in 2006 for one sole Writer category.

- 2004: Tony Collingwood (Yoko! Jakamoko! Toto!)
- 2005: John Godber and Jane Thornton (Scene - Oddsquad)

=== Breakthrough Talent ===
- 2007: Charles Martin
- 2008: Eliot Otis Brown Walters
- 2009: Adam Shaw

=== CBBC Me and My Movie ===
- 2008: The Prank
- 2009: Vern's Vacation

=== BAFTA Young Game Designers ===
- 2010: HAMSTER: Accidental World Domination
- 2011: Rollin' Scotch

==== Game Concept ====
- 2012: Vacuum Panic AKA Suck It Up

==== Game Making ====
- 2012: Smiley Dodgems

=== Multiplatform ===
- 2013: Kinect Sesame Street TV

== Ceremonies ==
Event	Date	Venue	Host(s)	Ref.
1st	1996	Unknown	Unknown	
2nd	6 April 1997	Unknown	Unknown	
3rd	18 October 1998	Thorpe Park	Unknown	
4th	7 November 1999	London Hilton	Katy Hill	
5th	12 November 2000	London Hilton	Emma Bunton; Ortis Deley	
6th	2 December 2001	London Hilton	Kate Thornton	
7th	24 November 2002	London Hilton	Richard Blackwood	
8th	30 November 2003	London Hilton	Fearne Cotton	
9th	28 November 2004	London Hilton	Fearne Cotton	
10th	27 November 2005	London Hilton	Emma Forbes	
11th	26 November 2006	London Hilton	Reggie Yates	
12th	25 November 2007	London Hilton	Keith Chegwin	
13th	29 November 2008	London Hilton	Keith Chegwin	
14th	29 November 2009	London Hilton	Dick and Dom	
15th	28 November 2010	London Hilton	Barney Harwood	
16th	27 November 2011	London Hilton	Barney Harwood	
17th	25 November 2012	London Hilton	Barney Harwood	
18th	24 November 2013	London Hilton	Jake Humphrey	
19th	23 November 2014	The Roundhouse	Doc Brown	
20th	22 November 2015	The Roundhouse	Doc Brown	
21st	20 November 2016	The Roundhouse	Doc Brown	
22nd	26 November 2017	The Roundhouse	Doc Brown	
23rd	25 November 2018	The Roundhouse	Marvin Humes; Rochelle Humes	
24th	1 December 2019	The Brewery, London	Ben Shires; Maddie Moate; Sam Homewood; Lindsey Russell; Nigel Clarke; Arielle Free	
25th	27 November 2022	Old Billingsgate	Lindsey Russell	
