= British Academy Children's Awards 2017 =

Award event

2017 British Academy Children's Awards
- Date: Sunday, 26 November 2017
- Venue: The Roundhouse, London
- Country: United Kingdom
- Hosted by: Doc Brown

Highlights
- Most nominations: CBBC (20)
- Website: www.baftakids.org

The 2017 British Academy Children's Awards was held on 26 November 2017, at The Roundhouse in London, honoring children's television programmes broadcast between October 2016 and October 2017. The ceremony was hosted by Doc Brown; CBBC had the most nominations.

== Awards ==
Winners are listed first, highlighted in boldface, and indicated with a double dagger (‡).

=== Animation ===
Nominee	Recipient(s)	Production Companies	Channel
**Revolting Rhymes**‡	**Production Team**	**Magic Light Pictures**	**BBC One**
The Amazing World of Gumball	Ben Bocquelet, Mic Graves, Sarah Fell	Cartoon Network Development Studio Europe	Cartoon Network
Shaun the Sheep	Will Becher, John Woolley, Richard Starzak	Aardman Animations	CBBC
We're Going on a Bear Hunt	Production Team	Lupus Films, Bear Hunt Films, Walker Productions, Herrick Entertainment	Channel 4

=== Channel ===
Nominee
Cartoon Network
CBBC
CBeebies
**TrueTube**

=== Comedy ===
Nominee	Recipient(s)	Production Companies	Channel
**Class Dismissed**	Sid Cole, Claire McCarthy, Tracey Rooney	CBBC Productions	CBBC
Hank Zipzer	Richard Grocock, Mark Oswin, Nick Collett	Kindle Entertainment, DHX Media, Walker Productions	CBBC
Horrible Histories	Production Team	Lion Entertainment	CBBC
So Awkward	Production Team	Channel X	CBBC

=== Drama ===
Nominee	Recipient(s)	Production Companies	Channel
Hank Zipzer's Christmas Catastrophe	Matt Bloom, Anne Brogan, Joe Williams	Kindle Entertainment, DHX Media, Walker Productions	CBBC
Hetty Feather	Matt Evans, Reza Moradi, David Collier	CBBC Productions	CBBC
Jamie Johnson	Production Team	Short Form Film Company	CBBC
**Like Me**	Adam Tyler, Bob Ayres, Toby Lloyd	CTVC Ltd	TrueTube

=== Entertainment ===
Nominee	Recipient(s)	Production Companies	Channel
**Bear Grylls Survival School**	Michael Kelpie, Phil Mount, Rob Sixsmith	Potato	ITV/CITV
The Dog Ate My Homework	Production Team	BBC Scotland	CBBC
Sam & Mark's Big Friday Wind-Up	Gareth Edwards, Steve Ryde, John Payne	CBBC Productions	CBBC
Swashbuckle	Anna Perowne, Geoff Coward, Tony Grech-Smith	CBeebies Productions	CBeebies

=== Factual ===
Nominee	Recipient(s)	Production Companies	Channel
Absolute Genius: Monster Builds	Matt Knight, James Knight, Annette Williams	CBBC Productions	CBBC
**Inside My Head: A Newsround Special**	Charlotte Ingham, Josh Gale	CBBC Productions	CBBC
My Life: Born to Vlog	Sarah Murch, Launa Kennett, Denis McWilliams	Blakeway North	CBBC
To Life	Production Team	CTVC Ltd	TrueTube

=== Feature Film ===
Nominee	Recipient(s)	Production Companies	Distributor
Kubo and the Two Strings	Travis Knight, Arianne Sutner	Laika	Focus Features
**The Little Prince**	Mark Osborne, Aton Soumache, Alexis Vonarb, Dimitri Rassam	On Animation Studios	Netflix
Moana	Ron Clements, John Musker, Osnat Shurer	Walt Disney Animation Studios, Walt Disney Pictures	Walt Disney Studios Motion Pictures
Sing	Chris Meledandri, Janet Healy, Garth Jennings	Illumination Entertainment	Universal Pictures

=== Game ===
Nominee	Recipient(s)	Developer	Publisher	Platform(s)
Monument Valley 2	Production team	Ustwo Games	Ustwo Games	iOS, Android
The Playroom VR	Production team	Japan Studio	Sony Computer Entertainment	PlayStation 4
**Pokémon Go**	Production team	Niantic	Niantic	iOS, Android
Pokémon Sun and Moon	Production team	Game Freak	The Pokémon Company	Nintendo 3DS

=== Independent Production Company ===
Nominee
**Blue-Zoo Animation Studio**
Karrot Entertainment
Magic Light Pictures
Strawberry Blond

=== Interactive ===
Nominee	Recipient(s)	Studio
Adventure Time: I See Ooo	Antonio Grasso, Anil Glendinning, Ben Trewhella	Turner Broadcasting System
The Gruffalo Spotter	Development Team	Magic Light Pictures, Nexus Studios
**Hey Duggee: We Love Animals**	Phil Hoskins, Keith Davidson, Peter Hickman	Scary Beasties Ltd, BBC Worldwide
Virry VR	Martin Percy, Svetlana Dragayeva, Joanna Folger	Fountain Digital Labs

=== International ===
Nominee	Recipient(s)	Production Companies	Channel
An American Girl Story – Melody 1963: Love Has to Win	Alison McDonald, Tina Mabry, Nicole Dow	Amazon Studios	Amazon Video
Ask the StoryBots	Evan Spiridellis, Gregg Spiridellis	JibJab Bros. Studios	Netflix
The Snowy Day	Production Team	Amazon Studios, Karrot Entertainment	Amazon Video
**SpongeBob SquarePants**	Stephen Hillenburg, Vincent Waller, Marc Ceccarelli	Nickelodeon Studios	Nickelodeon

=== Learning ===
Nominee	Recipient(s)	Production Companies
History Bombs Online History Resources	Production Team	History Bombs
Lifesaver VR	Martin Percy, Yates Buckley, Andy Lockey	UNIT9
Numberblocks	Joe Elliott, Simon Taylor, Laura Annis	Blue-Zoo Productions, CBeebies
SHIA // SUNNI	Adam Tyler, Bob Ayres, Toby Lloyd	CTVC Ltd

=== Performer ===
Actor/Actress	Role	Programme	Channel
**Alhaji Fofana**	Ryan	Screwball!	Truetube
Millie Innes	Millie McDonald	Millie Inbetween	CBBC
Phil Fletcher	Hacker T. Dog	CBBC Presentation	CBBC
Savannah Baker	Natalie	Screwball!	Truetube

=== Pre-School - Animation ===
Nominee	Recipient(s)	Production Companies	Channel
Digby Dragon	Adam Shaw, Chris Dew, Tom McDowell	Blue-Zoo Productions	Nick Jr.
**Hey Duggee**	Grant Orchard, Janine Voong, Sander Jones	Studio AKA	CBeebies
Peppa Pig	Mark Baker, Phil Davies, Joris Van Hulzen	Astley Baker Davies, Entertainment One	Channel 5
Sarah & Duck	Jamie Badminton, Sarah Gomes Harris, Tim O'Sullivan	Karrot Entertainment	CBeebies

=== Pre-School - Live-Action ===
Nominee	Recipient(s)	Production Companies	Channel
Apple Tree House	Production Team	Five Apples Ltd	CBeebies
CBeebies Stargazing: Mission Explore	Katie Simmons, Tom Couisins, Anna Perowne	CBeebies Productions	CBeebies
Do You Know?	Romily Menzies, Sarah Trigg, Paul Kittel	7 Wonder	CBeebies
**Our Family**	Sallyann Keize, Ruth Mills, Luke Gaille	Sixth Sense Media Limited	CBeebies

=== Presenter ===
Presenter(s)	Programme	Channel
Dr Chris van Tulleken & Dr Xand van Tulleken	Operation Ouch!	CBBC
Gemma Hunt	Swashbuckle	CBeebies
**Maddie Moate**	Do You Know?	CBeebies
Sam Nixon & Mark Rhodes	Sam & Mark's Big Friday Wind-Up	CBBC

=== Short Form ===
Nominee	Recipient(s)	Production Companies	Channel
CN Buddy Network	Daniel Fuller, Simon Dean, Charles Battrick	Turner Broadcasting System	Cartoon Network
The Happos Family	Patricia Hidalgo, Richelle Wilder, Erica Darby	Cyber Group Studios	Boomerang
Morph	Merlin Crossingham, Helen Argo, Peter Lord	Aardman Animations	Sky Kids
**Share a Story**	Production Team	ITV Studios	CITV

=== Writer ===
Writer(s)	Programme	Channel
**Adam Tyler**	Screwball!	TrueTube
Joe Williams	Hank Zipzer's Christmas Catastrophe	CBBC
Paul Rose, Luc Skyz, Mikis Michaelides	4 O'Clock Club	CBBC
Writing Team	The Amazing World of Gumball	Cartoon Network
