= Virti =

British Company

Coordinates: 51°27′19.0″N 2°35′33.3″W

Virti Inc
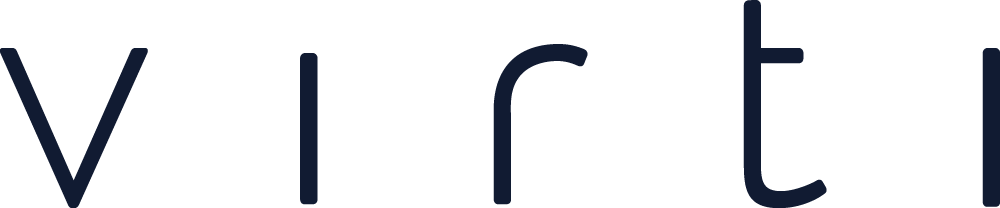
- Company type: Private
- Industry: Educational TechnologySoftware
- Founded: 2018
- Founder: Dr Alexander Young
- Headquarters: New York, United Kingdom
- Key people: Dr Alexander Young (Founder), Kurt Kratchman (CEO)
- Products: AI Roleplay training, Video Training platform, Scenario training
- Website: https://virti.com/

Virti is a technology company that offers an artificial intelligence (AI) powered platform for scenario-based training and roleplay. The platform combines interactive video and virtual human simulations to support the development of soft skills such as communication, leadership, and customer service. Virti’s training tools include both AI roleplay and immersive video content, enabling users to engage with realistic workplace scenarios across multiple formats. The platform is accessible via desktop, mobile, tablet, and virtual reality (VR), and is used in sectors such as healthcare, sales, retail, and professional services to help employees practice real-world interactions and receive AI feedback on their performance. Virti supports over 40 languages, including Spanish, Chinese, French, German, and Arabic, making it easy for global teams to train and learn in their preferred language.

The company operates globally with teams based in the United States, Canada, the United Kingdom, New Zealand, and Taiwan.

Virti immersive learning technologies are used by organizations globally including Amazon, Cedars-Sinai, NHS, HTC VIVE, HM Revenue and Customs, Frontier, NIH, and more.

== History ==
Virti was established in 2018 to address the challenges faced by learners in complex roles, such as difficulties accessing traditional learning and a lack of opportunities to practice and improve their skills. Dr. Alex Young, the founder, introduced Virti to the market as an innovative training solution that enables professionals to create immersive learning content, transforming how people learn and perform in their jobs.

During the COVID-19 pandemic, Virti released a new AI-powered “virtual patient” to enhance remote clinical training for medical professionals and trainees across the NHS and hospitals in the US. Their technology was instrumental in training healthcare workers. The platform trained over 300 doctors at Cedars-Sinai Hospital in Los Angeles in skills such as assessing patient symptoms and performing CPR while wearing protective clothing. The UK's National Health Service (NHS) also utilized Virti's technology to train staff on the correct use of personal protective equipment and effective communication with patients and their families.

Virti was named one of TIME’s Best Inventions of 2020 and Fast Company’s Most Innovative Companies of 2021. In 2022, Virti announced its partnership with HTC and Taipei Medical University (TMU) to revolutionize food safety training in Taiwan. By integrating Virti's immersive training platform with HTC's advanced VR hardware, the partnership enhanced the delivery of high-fidelity simulations for improved food safety training.

In 2024, Virti was featured by Emerge as one of the top Edtech companies in workforce development.

== Technology ==
Virti's platform can be used to create immersive training scenarios. These scenarios can be accessed via a desktop, mobile, VR headset or a tablet, allowing for flexible training options. The platform also uses AI to provide detailed feedback and metrics on the trainee's performance, helping to identify areas where further practice may be needed.

One of the key features of Virti's platform is the use of Virtual Humans. These are AI-powered digital characters that interact with the learner, testing their skills in various areas. The virtual humans can respond to the trainee's actions in real-time, providing a realistic and responsive training environment.

== Impact ==
Virti's technology has been used in various sectors, including sales, customer service, healthcare and education. In healthcare, the platform has been used to train doctors and nurses in skills such as patient assessment and CPR. It has also been used to improve communication skills and bedside manner, with the aim of improving patient outcomes

In education, Virti's technology has been used to provide immersive learning experiences for students. For example, the platform has been used to simulate socially distanced science experiments for school students.

In sports, Virti's technology has been used by cricketers in Bristol to stay on top form during the off-season
