= Bodimeade =

Bodimeade is a surname. Notable people with the surname include:

- Holly Bodimeade (fl. 2006), English actress
- Lee Bodimeade (born 1970), Australian field hockey player
