= Martin Percy =

British film director

Martin Percy is a British film director known for his innovative work in interactive films and digital learning, often using artificial intelligence in recent years. He has received numerous accolades for this work, including a BAFTA British Academy Award (from five nominations), an Emmy Award (from four nominations), eleven Webby Awards (from 22 nominations), a Grand Clio in the Clio Awards, and various other awards (see awards and nominations section below). Percy has created interactive films for institutions such as the Tate Gallery, the Asian Art Museum of San Francisco, the British Film Institute, the National Theatre, University of the Arts London, BT and Innovate UK. He has collaborated with notable talent including Sir Ian McKellen, Sir Derek Jacobi, and Daisy Ridley (see below). Percy is also a TEDx speaker, talking about his film Lifesaver and 'how to save lives with interactive film'.

Percy graduated from King's College, Cambridge, and is the son of the late illustrator Graham Percy.

== Use of AI in Interactive Film ==
Percy has integrated AI-driven interaction into much of his recent work, adapting films based on input from device cameras, accelerometers, and buttons. Some works also feature AI-generated video. Notable examples include:

- The Adaptive-Media Interview Coach (2022, UK) – Webby Award Winner, created by A-Dapt for Nacro, a social justice charity. Uses AI with emotion recognition to train individuals with social challenges for job interviews.
- Votre Coach Personnel (2023, France) – Webby Award Honoree, created by Adaptive Media France for France Travail. Uses AI with emotion recognition and face detection to give interview training personalised to the user’s age.
- AI Basics: Thrills Or Chills (2023, UK) – Webby Award Honoree, funded by Innovate UK. Uses AI-designed environments and AI-generated visualisations of AI chatbots in conversation.

== Interactive Crisis Simulator Films ==
One distinctive form of interactive film made by Percy simulates emergency situations. These require users to make good decisions fast - and thus learn by doing. Notable examples include:

- Fightback (2003, UK) – Percy's first experiment with the Interactive Crisis Simulator format, dealing with women’s personal safety. Funded by the London Film and Video Development Agency.
- Lifesaver (2012, UK) – Grand Clio Award Winner, Webby Winner, BAFTA nominee. Made in collaboration with UNIT9 for the Resuscitation Council UK. Initially co-funded by Innovate UK (then known as the Technology Strategy Board). Medical directors: Dr Andrew Lockey MBE and Dr Jasmeet Soar. Features the first professional role of Daisy Ridley.
- Lifesaver VR (2016, UK) – Webby Award Honoree, BAFTA nominee. Made in collaboration with UNIT9 for the Resuscitation Council UK.
- Real Talk About Suicide (2019, UK) – Webby Award Honoree, Campaign (magazine) Tech Awards 2020: Winner, Tech for Good. Crisis simulator film showing how to help someone with suicidal feelings. Made with Grassroots Suicide Prevention and UNIT9.
- Heart Class (2019, USA) – Emmy Award Winner, Webby Award Honoree. CPR crisis simulator film using collective interaction so that groups of people in a classroom can interact with the film via a host. Medical director Dr Lorrel Toft MD. Made with UNIT9 and the University of Louisville.
- CardiacCrash (2023, Canada) - 3x Webby Award Winner, Canadian Screen Awards nominee. Medical director: Dr. Lorrel Toft MD. Made with the Heart and Stroke Foundation of Canada. Four CPR crisis simulator films for collective interaction:
  - CardiacCrash: Chantal (In English, for schools)
  - CardiacCrash: Monica (In English, for adults)
  - CardiakXpress : Caroline (in French, for schools)
  - CardiakXpress : Jessica (in French, for adults)

Percy discussed the creation and philosophy behind these films in his TEDx talk, Lifesaver: How To Save Lives With Interactive Film (2016, Germany).

== Participatory documentaries for collective interaction ==
Another distinctive form of interactive film made by Percy are documentaries which use interactivity and audience discussion to make the views of the audience an integral part of the film experience. Notable examples include:

- Climate Emergency Interactive (2019, UK) – Webby Award Winner, made with UNIT9 and a collaborative group of students and staff for the University of the Arts London.
- AI Basics: Thrills Or Chills (2023, UK) – Webby Award Honoree, funded by Innovate UK.

== Virtual Reality Films ==
Percy has created virtual reality (VR) films that use immersive technology and interactive storytelling to engage users in educational and mindfulness experiences. Notable examples include:

- Lifesaver VR (2016, UK) – A Webby Honoree and BAFTA nominee teaching CPR through a simulated emergency. Developed with UNIT9 for the Resuscitation Council UK.
- Virry VR (2017, UK) – A BAFTA-nominated and Webby-winning film offering virtual interactions with wild animals. Filmed at Lewa Wildlife Conservancy, Kenya. Created in collaboration with Svetlana Dragayeva for Fountain Digital Labs.
- Virry Happy: Mindfulness in Nature VR (2020, UK) – A two times Webby-nominated film promoting mindfulness in natural settings, building on Virry VR.

== Other types of Interactive Film ==
Percy has developed several other distinct types or formats of interactive film. Notable examples include:

=== Interactive Interviews and Talks ===
In the 2000s, Percy created a number of interactive talks for the British Film Institute (BFI) and the Royal National Theatre, sponsored by BT. In these talks, celebrated individuals would ask the user questions and then respond to their response. These were built using Adobe Flash and so are no longer viewable. However links to screengrab recordings are given where available. Notable examples include:

- National Theatre: A Conversation with Sir Ian McKellen (2007, UK) – BAFTA nominee. Emmy nominee, 3x Webby nominee.
- BFI Screenonline Archive Interactives. Made in collaboration with Mark Duguid and Richard Paterson of the BFI, these used notable figures to explore British Film history:
  - Derek Jacobi on the GPO Film Unit (2007, UK) – Webby Award Honoree.
  - A Conversation with Julie Walters (2007, UK)
  - Malcolm McDowell on Free Cinema (2006, UK)
  - Jonathan Ross on Ealing Studios (2006, UK)
  - Paul Merton on early film comedy (2005, UK)

=== Interactive Art Explorers ===
In the 2000s, Percy created interactive films for Tate Modern, Tate Britain, Tate Liverpool, Tate St Ives, and Tate Online, many in collaboration with Will Gompertz and Tate Media, and all sponsored by BT. These used dozens or hundreds of video loops to allow users to explore artworks or locations depicted with film rather than with stills. To this he added interviews, music tracks, and stories as appropriate. He later used the same approach for the Asian Art Museum (San Francisco). Notable examples include:

- Asian Art Museum (San Francisco): The Bali Temple Explorer (2011, USA) – Webby Award Winner.
- Tate Kids: The Secret Dancer (2010, UK) – BAFTA nominee, Webby Nominee.
- Tate St Ives: Barbara's Garden (2009, UK) – Webby Nominee.
- Tate Liverpool: The One That Spoke to Me (2008, UK) – Webby Honoree, Emmy nominee.
- Tate Modern: Street Art HD (2008, UK) – Webby Honoree, Emmy nominee.
- Tate Modern: Tate Tracks (2006, UK) – 3x Webby Honoree.
- Tate Britain: The BT Series (2005, UK) – 2x Webby Honoree.

=== Animal Interaction Films ===
Created in collaboration with Svetlana Dragayeva for Fountain Digital Labs. These films combine video and interactivity via buttons, microphone and accelerometer to give users "the fairy tale feeling that they’re interacting directly" real wild animals. Notable examples include:

- Virry (2017, UK) – BAFTA Award winner, Webby Award Winner, filmed at Durrell Wildlife Conservation Trust, Jersey and other locations.
- Virry VR (2018, UK) – Webby Award winner, Webby Award Honoree, filmed at Lewa Wildlife Conservancy, Kenya.
- Virry Happy: Mindfulness in Nature VR (2020, UK) – 2x Webby Nominee, also filmed at Lewa.

== Effectiveness ==
Research on the effectiveness of Percy's work includes:

- The School Lifesavers Study by Dr. Joyce Yeung et al., published in Resuscitation, found that Lifesaver alone was 29% more effective than traditional face-to-face training alone. Combined with traditional CPR training, Lifesaver was 110% more effective than traditional face-to-face training alone.
- A New Era of Lay Rescuer CPR Training: An Interactive Approach for Engaging High Schoolers by Lorrel E.B. Toft M.D., Jamaal Richie M.D., John M. Wright M.D. et al., published in the Journal of the American College of Cardiology, found that Heart Class was 51% more effective at teaching CPR than comparable traditional classroom CPR training.
- Lifesaver app teaches CPR by throwing you into the action: Crisis simulator fuses interactivity with live-action film to show you how to respond to heart attacks and choking by Dr Jasmeet Soar, published in Resuscitation.

== Awards and nominations ==
=== 2020s ===
Year	Award	Category	Nominated work	Result	Ref.
2024	Webby Awards	AI, Metaverse & Virtual/ Public Service & Activism	AI Basics: Thrills Or Chills?	Won, Honoree	
2024	Webby Awards	AI, Metaverse & Virtual/ Science & Education	Votre Coach Personnel (VCP)	Won, Honoree	
2023	Webby Awards	AI, Metaverse & Virtual Public Service & Activism	CardiacCrash: Monica	Won	
2023	Webby Awards	AI, Metaverse & Virtual Public Service & Activism	CardiacCrash: Monica	Won, People's Voice	
2023	Webby Awards	AI, Metaverse & Virtual/ Science & Education	CardiacCrash: Monica	Won, People's Voice	
2023	Webby Awards	AI, Metaverse & Virtual/ Science & Education	Ms Rose, Adaptive Media Math Tutor	Nominated	
2022	Webby Awards	Virtual & Remote: Science & Education	The Adaptive-Media Interview Coach	Won	
2021	Webby Awards	AI, Metaverse & Virtual - Health & Wellness	Virry Happy: mindfulness in nature VR	Nominated	
2021	Webby Awards	AI, Metaverse & Virtual - Best 360-Video	Virry Happy: mindfulness in nature VR	Nominated	
2021	Webby Awards	Virtual Public Service & Activism	Climate Emergency Interactive	Won, People's Voice	
2020	Emmy Awards	Informational/ Instructional Program	Heart Class	Won	
2020	Webby Awards	Video/Immersive and Mixed Reality	Heart Class	Won, Honoree	
2020	Webby Awards	Video/Documentary (Immersive And Mixed Reality)	Real Talk About Suicide	Nominated	

=== 2010s ===
Year	Award	Category	Nominated work	Result	Ref.
2018	Webby Awards	Video/ VR: Interactive, Game or Real-Time	Lifesaver VR	Won, Honoree	
2017	Webby Awards	VR: Gaming, Interactive, or Real-time	Virry VR	Won, People's Voice	
2017	Webby Awards	Video/ Travel & Lifestyle	Virry VR	Won, Honoree	
2017	BAFTA British Academy Awards	Children's Interactive	Virry VR	Nominated	
2017	BAFTA British Academy Awards	Children's Learning	Lifesaver VR	Nominated	
2015	BAFTA British Academy Awards	Children's Interactive: Original	Virry	Won	
2015	Webby Awards	Family & Kids (Mobile Sites & Apps)	Virry	Won, People's Choice	
2013	Clio Awards	Healthcare - App	Lifesaver	Won, Grand Clio	
2013	BAFTA British Academy Awards	Children's Interactive	Lifesaver	Nominated	
2014	Webby Awards	Education & Reference (Handheld)	Lifesaver	Won, People's Choice	
2013	Lovie Awards	Best Use of Interactive Video	Lifesaver	Won, Gold	
2013	Lovie Awards	People's Choice, Best Use of Interactive Video	Lifesaver	Won, People's Choice	
2012	Webby Awards	Best Use of Interactive Video	Jameson 1780	Won	
2012	Webby Awards	People's Choice, Best Use of Interactive Video	Jameson 1780	Won, People's Choice	
2012	Webby Awards	Youth	Tate Kids: Wondermind	Nominated	
2012	Webby Awards	Best Use of Interactive Video	Tate Kids: Wondermind	Won, Honoree	
2011	Webby Awards	Travel & Adventure	The Asian Art Museum of San Francisco: The Bali Temple Explorer	Won	
2012	Webby Awards	Religion & Spirituality	The Asian Art Museum of San Francisco: The Bali Temple Explorer	Won, Honoree	
2011	Webby Awards	Tourism	The Asian Art Museum of San Francisco: The Bali Temple Explorer	Won, Honoree	
2010	BAFTA British Academy Awards	Children's Interactive	Tate Kids: The Secret Dancer	Nominated	
2010	Webby Awards	Best Use of Interactive Video	Tate Kids: The Secret Dancer	Nominated	
2010	Webby Awards	Broadband	Tate St Ives: Barbara's Garden	Nominated	

=== 2000s ===
Year	Award	Category	Nominated work	Result	Ref.
2009	Emmy Awards	New Approaches To News & Documentary Programming: Arts, Lifestyle & Culture	Tate Modern: Street Art HD	Nominated	
2009	Webby Awards	Best Use of Interactive Video	Tate Modern: Street Art HD	Nominated	
2009	Webby Awards	Broadband	Tate Modern: Street Art HD	Won, Honoree	
2009	Emmy Awards	New Approaches To News & Documentary Programming: Arts, Lifestyle & Culture	Tate Liverpool: The One That Spoke to Me	Nominated	
2009	Webby Awards	Art	Tate Liverpool: The One That Spoke to Me	Won, Honoree	
2008	Webby Awards	Best Use of Interactive Video	Meyers Hill	Won, Honoree	
2008	Webby Awards	Best Use of Interactive Video	BFI: Derek Jacobi on The GPO Film Unit	Won, Honoree	
2008	Webby Awards	Music (Website)	Tate Tracks	Won, Honoree	
2008	Webby Awards	Cultural Institutions (Website)	Tate Tracks	Won, Honoree	
2008	Webby Awards	Broadband (Website)	Tate Tracks	Won, Honoree	
2009	BAFTA British Academy Awards	Interactive Innovation	National Theatre: A Conversation with Sir Ian McKellen	Nominated	
2009	Webby Awards	Best Use of Interactive Video	National Theatre: A Conversation with Sir Ian McKellen	Nominated	
2008	Webby Awards	Broadband	National Theatre: A Conversation with Sir Ian McKellen	Nominated	
2008	Webby Awards	Documentary: Individual Episode	National Theatre: A Conversation with Sir Ian McKellen	Nominated	
2007	Emmy Awards	Outstanding Arts, Lifestyle & Culture Programming For Broadband	National Theatre: A Conversation with Sir Ian McKellen	Nominated	
2006	Webby Awards	Art	Tate Britain: The BT Series	Nominated	
2007	Webby Awards	Art	Tate Britain: The BT Series	Won, Honoree	
2006	Webby Awards	Art	Tate Britain: The BT Series	Nominated	
2007	Webby Awards	Art	Tate Britain: The BT Series	Won, Honoree	
2005	Webby Awards	Broadband	Tate Britain: "Let's Play 66"	Won, Honoree	
