= Summerhill (TV series) =

British children's television drama

- Genre: Children's drama
- Written by: Alison Hume
- Directed by: Jon East
- Country of origin: United Kingdom
- Original language: English
- No. of series: 1
- No. of episodes: 4

Production
- Running time: 30 minutes
- Production company: Tiger Aspect Productions

Original release
- Network: CBBC
- Release: 21 January – 29 January 2008

Summerhill is a British children's television drama about the famously radical Summerhill School in Leiston in Suffolk, written by Alison Hume and directed by Jon East. It was first broadcast on the CBBC Channel in January 2008 and was subsequently nominated for three children's BAFTA awards: Best Drama, Best Writer (for Alison Hume) and Breakthrough Talent (for Eliot Otis Brown Walters). It won the awards for writer & breakthrough nominations. The show launched the careers of a number of young actors, most notably Jessie Cave who went on to star as 'Lavender Brown' in Harry Potter and the Half-Blood Prince, and also Olly Alexander, Eliot Otis Brown Walters, and Holly Bodimeade.

The series was also shown on BBC One, and as a feature-length film on BBC Four.

== Cast ==
- Eliot Otis Brown Walters as Ryan
- Holly Bodimeade as Maddy
- Jessie Cave as Stella
- Olly Alexander as Ned
- Sam Hoare as Phil
- Ron Cook as Ofsted Inspector Wharton
- Tracy-Ann Oberman as Alice Ford
- Annette Badland as Ofsted Inspector Myrtle
- Ruth Gemmell as Rose
- Geraldine McNulty as Zoe
- Ed Pearce as Ofsted Officer
- Karl Rogers as Peter
- Connor McIntyre as Len
- Chae-eun Park as Sung-Ha
- Lola Mae Loughran as Ellen

== Episodes ==
No.	Title	Original release date
1	"Episode 1"	21 January 2008
Welcome to Summerhill, a school where pupils make the rules and are encouraged to play. 11-year-old Maddie is sent to Summerhill after collapsing from exam stress. When she arrives, she can't believe it is true – a school where you don't have to go to lessons, where you're encouraged to play, where you make all the rules yourself and where climbing trees and building boats are definitely part of the curriculum. When 14-year-old Ryan is sent there after no other school can contain his disruptive behaviour, he thinks he has gone to Heaven.
2	"Episode 2"	22 January 2008
New pupils Maddy and Ryan switch roles as Maddy becomes a rebel and Ryan submits.
3	"Episode 3"	28 January 2008
Maddy admits that she, not Ryan, caused the fire at the school.
4	"Episode 4"	29 January 2008
The pupils of Summerhill take the government to court to fight the closure of the school.

== Awards and nominations ==
Year	Award	Category	Recipients	Result
2008	British Academy Children's Awards	Children's: Drama	Alison Hume, Stephen Smallwood, and Jon East	Nominated
2008	British Academy Children's Awards	Children's: Writer	Alison Hume	Won
2008	Royal Television Society Awards	Writer of the Year	Alison Hume	Won
