= Accused (2010 TV series) =

British TV drama series

- Genre: Anthology; Legal drama
- Created by: Jimmy McGovern
- Written by: Jimmy McGovern; Danny Brocklehurst; Alice Nutter; Esther Wilson; Shaun Duggan; Isabelle Grey
- Directed by: David Blair; Richard Laxton; Ashley Pearce
- Starring: Christopher Eccleston; Benjamin Smith; Mackenzie Crook; Juliet Stevenson; Peter Capaldi; Andy Serkis; John Paul Hurley; Marc Warren; Naomie Harris; Sean Bean; Stephen Graham; Anne-Marie Duff; Olivia Colman; John Bishop; Robert Sheehan; Moir McCallum; Anna Maxwell Martin; Sheridan Smith
- Country of origin: United Kingdom
- Original language: English
- No. of series: 2
- No. of episodes: 10

Production
- Executive producer: Polly Hill
- Producer: Sita Williams
- Production locations: Manchester; North West England
- Running time: 60 minutes
- Production company: RSJ Films

Original release
- Network: BBC One
- Release: 15 November 2010 – 4 September 2012

Accused is a British television anthology series created by Jimmy McGovern. The drama series first aired on 15 November 2010 on BBC One and ran for two series. Each episode follows a different character as they await their verdict in court, and tells the story behind how they find themselves accused. The series featured actors such as Christopher Eccleston, Benjamin Smith, Juliet Stevenson, Andy Serkis, Marc Warren, Naomie Harris, Sean Bean and Anne-Marie Duff as the accused in each episode.

The series follows previous drama series by McGovern, including anthology series The Street and Moving On. After the cancellation of The Street in 2009 by Granada Television, McGovern formed RSJ Films to produce independent drama programmes and subsequently devised the Accused anthology series. Accused was written by McGovern, Danny Brocklehurst and Alice Nutter and was filmed in Manchester. In 2011 it won an International Emmy for best drama series.

== Production ==
=== Series one ===
The series was commissioned by Jay Hunt and Ben Stephenson, controllers of BBC One and Drama Commissioning respectively, and announced in May 2010. Each episode revolves around a different character as they make their way to the dock in court to hear whether they've been found guilty of a crime. As they walk, the events that led up to them being accused of the crime play out and leave the viewers questioning whether each of the people is really guilty or not. McGovern said of the series:

In the time it takes to climb the steps to the court we tell the story of how the accused came to be here. We see the crime and we see the punishment. Nothing else. No police procedure, thanks very much, no coppers striding along corridors with coats flapping. Just crime and punishment – the two things that matter most in any crime drama.

McGovern was the lead writer for the series, with co-writers Alice Nutter, Danny Brocklehurst and Esther Wilson for episodes three, four and five respectively. The series was directed by David Blair (episodes 1, 2, 5 and 6) and Richard Laxton (episodes 3 and 4), and produced by RSJ Films, a company founded by Jimmy McGovern, Sita Williams and Roxy Spencer. RSJ Films is also known for making the award-winning BBC series The Street. Filming for the series took place around Manchester between May and August 2010.

A number of the cast were announced along with the series: Christopher Eccleston and Pooky Quesnel feature in "Willy's Story"; and Mackenzie Crook, Robert Pugh, Benjamin Smith and Ben Batt feature in "The Soldier Story" (changed to "Frankie's Story"). It was announced in June 2010 that Juliet Stevenson and Peter Capaldi had been cast to star in "Helen's Story", and Andy Serkis would be in "Liam's Story". In July 2010, Naomie Harris was cast in "Alison's Story", and in August Marc Warren was cast in "Kenny's Story".

=== Series two ===
On 24 February 2011, BBC Drama Controller Ben Stephenson announced that Accused had been renewed for a second series of four episodes, to be broadcast sometime in 2012. Despite the relatively low viewing figures from the first series, the second was commissioned in the hopes that it would have the potential to find a broader audience.

Filming for the first two episodes of the second series began around November 2011. The new cast members confirmed to appear in these episodes included Anne-Marie Duff, Olivia Colman, Robert Sheehan, Joe Dempsie, Sheridan Smith, Paul Popplewell and comedian John Bishop. The first episode, starring Colman and Duff, would be written by McGovern and Carol Cullington, while writing credits on the second episode (starring Sheehan, Bishop and Smith) would again be shared by Daniel Brocklehurst and McGovern.

In January 2012, it was confirmed that Anna Maxwell Martin would join Sheehan and Bishop in the second episode. It was also announced that Sean Bean had joined the cast as "an English teacher who has a cross-dressing alter ego", and would star in an episode alongside Stephen Graham, which would be co-written by McGovern and Shaun Duggan and directed by Ashley Pearce.

The first episode of series 2 was aired on 14 August 2012, following a large advertising campaign. The final episode included a different concept from the rest of the two series: although none is the lead character, four characters (Jake, Stephen, Stephen's father and the judge) from previous episodes appear and are significant towards the story. On the DVD release of series 2, "Tracie's story" was moved from the start of the series to the end for an unknown reason, though this does not affect the chronology of the overlapping plots in the other three episodes.

== Episodes ==
=== Series 1 (2010) ===
#	Title	Director	Writer	Original release date	UK viewers (millions)
1	"Willy's Story"	David Blair	Jimmy McGovern	15 November 2010	4.74
Lapsed Catholic plumber Willy Houlihan (Christopher Eccleston) is about to tell his wife Carmel (Pooky Quesnel) that he has been cheating on her when their daughter Laura (Joanna Higson) announces she is getting married. Willy struggles with his secret and with the costs of the wedding and so he makes a pact with God that he will give up his mistress, with whom he is still planning to run away, if God will help him with his financial difficulties. Later, Willy finds a packet containing £20,000 in the back of a taxi, after discussing with his wife what they should do with it, he decides to bet it all on red in a game of roulette and wins; however, it turns out that Willy never gave up his mistress and the money that he had found was all forged. At his daughter's wedding Willy is arrested for money laundering. He is tried, convicted and sentenced to 6 years in prison.
2	"Frankie's Story"	David Blair	Jimmy McGovern	22 November 2010	3.39
Frankie Nash (Benjamin Smith) and Peter McShane Jr. (Ben Batt) join the British army to get out of going to prison for fighting in a pub. They are soon on the front-line in Afghanistan and Peter's cowardice in battle leads him to be bullied by the rest of his battalion and especially by Corporal Alan Buckley (Mackenzie Crook) who dubs him "the bitch". The bullying pushes Peter into a depressive state and things go too far when Buckley orders Frankie to urinate on Peter's bed; this pushes Peter beyond breaking point and he shoots himself. The Corporal ask Frankie to keep his mouth shut for the reason of keeping Peter's honour. Frankie accompanies Peter's body back to England and at the funeral Peter's father, Peter Sr. (Robert Pugh), opens the casket to see the self-inflicted wound and questions Frankie about what happened to Peter in Afghanistan. On his return, Frankie reports Buckley to the Sergeant who ignores the accusation and results in him becoming the new "bitch". Images of Peter's body haunt Frankie and one night he stabs Buckley to death. Frankie is arrested for murder and, after refusing to reveal his motivations for killing Buckley, is convicted, and given a life sentence, with a minimum term of 25 years.
3	"Helen's Story"	Richard Laxton	Alice Nutter and Jimmy McGovern	29 November 2010	3.84
When Rob Ryland (Joseph Phillips) and Michael Lang (Alfie Allen) start a new job temping at a local factory, they are not given an adequate safety briefing. Rob is later killed in an incident with a forklift truck. The police arrive at the house of Rob's parents, Helen (Juliet Stevenson) and Frank (Peter Capaldi), and tell them of the accident. Helen pursues the company that hired Rob to find the full details of his death and they fob her off with a story, but unsatisfied with the story and with the fact the factory has no CCTV for the day of Rob's death, she seeks legal action. Michael later reveals to Helen, after being persuaded by his girlfriend (Tina O'Brien), that the health and safety talk they were given was substandard and also that the factory has given him a full time job to buy his silence. At the inquest into Rob's death, the coroner finds the death to be accidental, so Helen breaks into the factory using Rob's ID and pleads with the manager Alan Maxfield (Peter Wight) to accept responsibility for the accident. He does not and so later she sets fire to the factory. Helen is arrested on a charge of arson and during her trial Frank barges in dressed as a clown and professes his contempt for the legal system. At the end of her trial, Helen is found not guilty.
4	"Liam's Story"	Richard Laxton	Danny Brocklehurst and Jimmy McGovern	6 December 2010	3.42
Liam Black (Andy Serkis) is a taxi driver with a gambling problem and a wife Roz (Neve McIntosh) suffering from multiple sclerosis. When Liam's daughter makes it into a posh private school, he breaks into the house of Emma (Jodie Whittaker), a woman he drove in his taxi, and steals her grandmother's necklace to give as a present to his daughter for getting into the school. Whilst in Emma's house, Liam also steals a USB drive from her laptop. Liam starts reading her diary and he begins fantasising about life with Emma. Liam carries on picking Emma up for different appointments and nights out; he begins to falsely bond with her over details he found in her diary and to watch her as she goes about her everyday life. One night, Liam picks Emma's boyfriend, Neil (Tom Ellis), and realises Neil is, unbeknown to Emma, married with a child. Liam later takes a photo of Neil with the latter's family and posts it through Emma's letterbox, causing the two of them to break up. Liam gets closer to Emma and they begin a relationship, leading him to leave his wife and daughter. On the day Liam tells Roz that he is leaving her, Neil turns up at Liam's home, and Neil beats up Liam for Liam's lie to Emma about not having a wife. In retaliation, Liam runs over Neil with his cab, killing him instantly. Liam is arrested for Neil's murder and is convicted and sentenced to life imprisonment with a minimum term of 15 years.
5	"Kenny's Story"	David Blair	Esther Wilson and Jimmy McGovern	13 December 2010	3.69
Kenny Armstrong (Marc Warren) is a loving family man, who works in a crematorium. When his young daughter Chloe is attacked in a local park, Kenny and his two friends, brothers Gordon (Joe Duttine) and Neil (Jack Deam), search the area for the assailant. They apprehend a man who matches Chloe's vague description; Kenny punches him, breaking his own wrist in the process. The brothers, primarily Gordon, continue beating the man. The trio flee, and the man is found some time later and taken to hospital, where he dies of his injuries. Kenny learns of the man's death, alerts Neil and Gordon and they all agree to stay quiet. The murder gradually begins to weigh on Kenny's conscience and he contemplates confessing, believing a court may sympathise with the fact he was seeking retribution for his daughter's assault; Gordon and Neil vehemently oppose this idea, due to their involvement. Kenny's guilt further intensifies when he has to cremate the dead man's body at work. Eventually, another local young girl is attacked in almost identical circumstances to Chloe and the trio realise that they killed an innocent man. Kenny's conscience finally breaks and he confesses everything to the local police, including Gordon and Neil's involvement. In court, the jury finds Gordon and Neil not guilty, despite their greater culpability, because the only evidence against them is Kenny's confession. The jury finds Kenny guilty of murder and he is sentenced to life imprisonment, with a minimum term of 15 years.
6	"Alison's Story"	David Blair	Jimmy McGovern	20 December 2010	3.19
After Alison Wade (Naomie Harris) and her husband David (Warren Brown) separate, she faces losing custody of her children. Alison and David's estrangement is caused by a night of unfaithfulness on Alison's part. She and David become hostile towards each other, and he rapes her, leading to their separation and a custody battle. One day, while walking back to her car with her new boyfriend Ben (Andrew Knott), he is suddenly attacked by two men. She is pulled over by the police while driving him to hospital and is arrested under suspicion of intent to supply drugs that they have found hidden in her car. During her trial, one of the men who attacked Ben is called upon as the informant that called the police about Alison's drug dealing. She immediately disregards the man and passes a note to her lawyer telling her to ask him about the colour of her car. He cannot answer and Alison's innocence is proved. She is found not guilty. Her husband and his father are then arrested for perjury and perverting the course of justice, as they had planted the drugs in Alison's car.

=== Series 2 (2012) ===
#	Title	Director	Writer	Original release date	UK viewers (millions)
1	"Tracie's Story"	Ashley Pearce	Shaun Duggan & Jimmy McGovern	14 August 2012	6.15
Simon (Sean Bean) is a bored English teacher who teaches uninterested teenage students by day, and becomes Tracie, a trans woman, by night. On one particular night out she meets Tony (Stephen Graham) at a nightclub, culminating in the pair having sex at Tracie's home. The pair strike up a casual relationship, with Tony confessing that his wife has died and he is a widower. It is revealed, however, that Tony's wife Karen (Rachel Leskovac) is still alive when Simon walks past Tony in town and follows him. Simon tracks down Karen's place of work and receives a makeover from her, and later on Karen confronts Tony about messages from Tracie on his phone. In a brutal attack, Tony murders Karen because "he couldn't hurt her by leaving". He and Tracie (unaware of the murder) travel to the Lake District and Tony confesses all. Tracie runs away, with Tony in pursuit, but Tony cannot bring himself to kill her. Tracie is charged with murder but is found not guilty, and Tony is imprisoned for murder.
2	"Mo's Story"	David Blair	Jimmy McGovern	21 August 2012	5.47
Mo Murray (Anne-Marie Duff) is a single mother working as a hairdresser, who refuses to close her shop in order to respect a recently deceased gang member. The gang leader, Martin Cormack (Joe Dempsie), threatens repercussions, leading to the teenage son of her best friend Sue Brown (Olivia Colman) being shot dead in broad daylight. After supporting Sue in joining a women against guns campaign, Mo learns that the killer is her own teenage son Jake (Thomas Brodie-Sangster), who was ordered to do it by the gang in order to avoid being the victim himself. Mo reluctantly helps to hide the gun and becomes distant towards Sue, before armed police raid the salon, finding the gun. Mo and her assisting mother (Ruth Sheen) are given suspended sentences for perverting the course of justice, while Jake is sentenced to a minimum of 12 years for murder. Mo is visited by a furious Sue, who deplores her claims in court of also having lost a son that day, stating that her own pain is far worse and unimaginable.
3	"Stephen's Story"	David Blair	Danny Brocklehurst & Jimmy McGovern	28 August 2012	5.18
Stephen Cartwright (Robert Sheehan) is a 17-year-old driven mad and to attempt murder following the death of his mother. After the death of Stephen's mother, his father Peter (John Bishop) begins a new relationship with his mother's former hospice nurse, Charlotte (Sheridan Smith) which deeply unsettles Stephen, believing that she had orchestrated his mother's death because of her attraction to his father. Stephen's lack of ability to accept her ultimate role as his stepmother leads to mental illness and the belief that she is attempting to poison him and had purposefully killed the family dog. Stephen's madness eventually leads to him destroying all ties with his family, increasing hallucinations and destructive behaviour. British political figure Alastair Campbell makes an appearance in this episode as one of Stephen's hallucinations. Stephen eventually attempts to kill Charlotte in what he, in his distressed state, claimed to be "self defence" of his remaining family (and in particular his brother). Stephen is found guilty of attempted murder, and sentenced to 6 years in juvenile detention centre. Sometime later, Charlotte visits him, telling him that both Peter and Dom are ill.
4	"Tina's Story"	Ashley Pearce	Isabelle Grey & Jimmy McGovern	4 September 2012	4.27
Tina Dhakin (Anna Maxwell Martin) is a prison officer in charge of young offender inmates, including Stephen Cartwright. It doesn't take long for Tina to notice that Stephen is ill, and she remarks to her colleague Frank (Ewen Bremner) to put him in a cell with someone else to keep an eye on him. Frank ignores these warnings and Stephen is later found dead, as a result of hanging himself. Frank and Tina both deny to the governor (and later Peter) that they thought Stephen was in any danger. Tina cannot handle the guilt, and her husband encourages her to tell the truth. Tina tells Frank she will reveal all and Frank, annoyed, allows her to be raped by an inmate. Tina finally tells the governor everything, and in her final scene is transporting Jake Murray, who faces 12 years in prison. Tina, still feeling guilty for Stephen's death, frees him in the police van, telling him he will die in prison. She is apprehended for aiding the escape of a convict and sentenced to one year in prison with a suspended sentence of one year. Peter thanks her for her help with Stephen after realising she tried to save his life by resuscitating him, and Tina leaves her job in the prison and is a free woman with her family.

== Reception ==
Reviewing the first episode, Lucy Mangan for The Guardian said, "It was – as ever with the writer of The Street, Cracker and Hillsborough – a compelling dissection of the fragility of ordinary lives, but you did long for just a little light and shade." The Independent's Brian Viner praised the actors, including Eccleston, and the story for being about a plumber living "in an ordinary house in an unremarkable Northern town" and not about "a detective, or a doctor, barrister, architect or spy". In The Herald, Damien Love also praised Eccleston's "brilliant" and "electrifying" performance, and said, "It's a strange, spiky programme, never perfect, but supremely watchable".

The controversial second episode was reviewed by Pete Naughton for The Daily Telegraph, who said, "what McGovern tried and largely succeeded to do was to paint a compelling picture of the brutality that can arise when men under high levels of stress turn on one another" and that "it seemed clear early on that this was a drama about institutionalised bullying whose characters happened to be soldiers, rather than an attempt at a journalistic-style exposé of bullying within the Army". In The Guardian, John Crace found it "compelling": "McGovern remains one of the best TV writers in the business and if he does tend to get carried away with torturing his own characters, you can forgive him because of the pace and economy with which he delivers the story." Asking if it was good enough, Brian Viner for The Independent praised the acting and Crook's performance, and said: "McGovern's manifold skills shone through, too. ... However, I thought "Willy's Story" last week a finer piece of drama, character-led where this was issue-led, leaving too many questions unresolved."

Although critically successful the show was not a ratings success. The show opened with 5.39 million viewers but ended with 3.19 million viewers.

== Adaptations ==
=== French adaptation ===
In January 2014, France 2 ordered a French version of the series. It was co-produced by France Télévisions and 3e Œil Story, with Ivan Sadik and Pierre-Antoine Capton as executive producers. It premiered on January 14, 2015. In early 2015, the show was renewed for a second season.

=== American adaptation ===
In May 2021, Fox ordered an American adaptation of the series. It was co-produced between Sony Pictures Television, All3Media America and Fox Entertainment, with Howard Gordon, Alex Gansa and David Shore as executive producers. It premiered on January 22, 2023.

== Awards and nominations ==
Year	Award	Series / Crew	Category	Result	Reference
2011	BAFTA TV Awards	Juliet Stevenson	Best Actress	Nominated	
2011	Writers' Guild of Great Britain Awards	Jimmy McGovern, Daniel Brockelhurst, Alice Nutter and Esther Wilson	Best Television Drama Series	Nominated	
2011	International Emmy Awards	Series One	Best Drama Series	Won	
2011	International Emmy Awards	Christopher Eccleston	Best Actor	Won	
2013	Royal Television Society Programme Awards	Sean Bean	Actor: Male	Won	
2013	Royal Television Society Programme Awards	Olivia Colman	Actor: Female	Won	
2013	Royal Television Society Programme Awards	Anne-Marie Duff	Actor: Female	Nominated	
2013	BAFTA TV Awards	Series Two	Best Mini-Series	Nominated	
2013	BAFTA TV Awards	Sean Bean	Best Leading Actor	Nominated	
2013	BAFTA TV Awards	Stephen Graham	Best Supporting Actor	Nominated	
2013	BAFTA TV Awards	Olivia Colman	Best Supporting Actress	Won	
2013	International Emmy Awards	Series Two	Best Drama Series	Nominated	
2013	International Emmy Awards	Sean Bean	Best Actor	Won	
