= Rhestr Nadolig Wil =

2008 television film

Rhestr Nadolig Wil (Wil's Christmas List) is a Welsh language television film first broadcast in 2008 on S4C. It follows the story of Wil, an 8-year-old boy, and Santa Claus, who crashes into the roof of Wil's barn a week before Christmas.

It won the 2009 Children's BAFTA for drama.
