= Benjamin Smith (actor) =

British actor (born 1989)

- Born: 27 December 1989 (age 36); Edgware, North London, England
- Other name: Ben Smith
- Occupation: Actor
- Years active: 1993–present
- Notable work: Only Fools and Horses

Benjamin Smith (born 27 December 1989) is an English actor.

Smith's most known famous role is Damien Trotter in Only Fools and Horses.

Among Smith's other early roles are Holby City, Goodnight Mister Tom and Second Sight. He played Luke in the 2006 Doctor Who episode "School Reunion" and Joey Frazier in BBC's Hustle. He played Jack in the BBC's Sherlock Holmes and the Baker Street Irregulars (2007).

In 2008, he played Tegs on EastEnders and Donny on Skins. He was also in the stage production of Dennis Kelly's DNA.

Smith also appeared in Teachers, The Bill and Help! I'm a Teenage Outlaw. He had a recurring guest role in the first series of the E4 series Misfits (2009). That year he also appeared in the film Nowhere Boy. In 2010 he was the main character in episode 2 of the Jimmy McGovern-penned BBC drama serial Accused, where he played Frankie, a young soldier who seeks revenge on an army corporal after his friend commits suicide due to the corporal's actions.

In the following few years, Smith had roles in Scott & Bailey, The Honourable Woman and Common, also written by Jimmy McGovern. In 2015 he appeared in the Channel 4 police comedy-drama No Offence. In 2019 he appeared as Lennox, a British journalist sympathetic to Irish republicanism, in Netflix/RTÉ's Irish war of Independence drama Resistance.
