= Prosiect Z =

Welsh children's television series

Prosiect Z (meaning Project Z) is a Welsh language children's television series broadcast on S4C. It is produced by Boom Cymru and first broadcast on 9 January 2018.

The series follows teams of five children as they try to escape the virus that has turned everyone else into zombies. The teams have to solve puzzles while dodging the zombies ('zeds') who are wandering around the area. Each programme takes place using the children's school as the set. Setting off the school fire alarm gives the teams a chance to crack a code to exit the building.

The series won a Children's BAFTA for best entertainment programme, in November 2018, S4C's first Children's BAFTA since 2001.

In March 2019 the programme won a Royal Television Society Award for Best Children's Programme.
