= Help! I'm a Teenage Outlaw =

- Genre: Children
- Created by: Andy Watts & Holly Lyons
- Starring: Benjamin Smith; Eliot Otis Brown Walters; Lucinda Dryzek; Brian Hibbard; George Pearcy
- Country of origin: United Kingdom
- Original language: English
- No. of series: 2
- No. of episodes: 13

Production
- Producer: 20th Century Fox
- Production location: Czech Republic
- Running time: 25 minutes

Original release
- Network: ITV (CITV)
- Release: 22 October 2004 – 7 February 2006

Help! I'm a Teenage Outlaw is a British television programme filmed in the Czech Republic and first aired on CITV. The show follows three hapless outlaws during the English Civil War, who are trying to bring justice back to the land. The programme is based on the classic children's novel, The Children of the New Forest by Frederick Marryat.

== Synopsis ==
The year is 1643, a time of civil war in England and Wales.

In Hampshire, when twelve-year-old Tom York inherits the family business, he discovers that his mother was the wild and daring highwayman Swiftnick, a title which now passes to Tom, but the last thing Tom needs is a dangerous and poorly paid after school job.

Tom loves the fame and glory that comes with the title Swiftnick, but his vanity is coupled with an overblown sense of his ability as a highwayman: his vanity and overconfidence regularly land him and his gang in trouble. If things get a little too dangerous, Tom isn't above taking a non confrontational approach to hold-ups; he is quite prepared to lie, cheat, charm, trick, scam and beg.

The Swiftnick Gang (Tom, Moses and Deedee) face a different problems and they have to solve them in the most bizarre ways. They set out their adventures together, by defeating Sir John and robbing coaches.

== Cast ==
- Lucinda Dryzek as Lady Devereux/DeeDee
- Benjamin Smith as Tom A.K.A. Swiftnick
- Eliot Otis Brown Walters as Moses
- Brian Hibbard as Sir John
- Steve O'Donnell as Captain Watt
- Mattew Curtis as Food Tester
- George Pearcy as Giles

== Characters ==
=== Major characters ===
Tom York is a 12-year-old boy who discovers that his late mother was the notorious highwaywoman Swiftnick. Though something of a coward, Tom dons a mask and, having decided he looks dashing enough, takes up the mantle to continue the family tradition. He is obnoxious and has a soft spot for Lady Devereux. Tom would do anything to get money and would sometimes end up with a rubbish plan like when he and Moses dressed up as women to get in the castle in the episode "Kidnapped". Tom thinks extremely highly of himself and presents himself as someone who is nearly unbeatable, when he perfectly well knows he is not.

Moses is Tom's best friend and a precocious ten-year-old who fancies himself as an inventor but whose creations rarely work. He was once Sir John's inventor. At times he is feeble and is useless but can be fiercely loyal to Tom as was displayed in the episode "Pants".

Deedee is a tomboyish girl who is more courageous, resourceful and capable than the two lads put together. Although Deedee masquerades as a peasant, she is actually Lady Devereux, the lady of the local castle. The other two are unaware of this; she hides herself by making up excuses when she gets news from the castle. She has a secret tunnel that can lead out of the village from her wardrobe. In the episode "Locked In", the three got locked in the crypt and she decided to write about when they all first met. It turned out that she was being robbed but tricked them into giving her their clothes. She decided to be an outlaw when she thought her father who went to war was kidnapped. In one of the episodes, Lady Devereux falls for a rich lord called Felix. Although criticising Tom's leadership skills at times she prefers to have him lead rather than anyone else as otherwise the gang falls apart as seen in "Pants" where Bardolph becomes leader of the gang.

Sir John Snakelaw is Devereux's uncle and her legal guardian who imposes crippling taxes on the local populace. Sir John is supported by a motley crew including Captain Watt and a hapless team of guards. He also has a food taster whose ingestion of poison has prematurely aged him so that he looks 50 rather than 20. He hates his mother and would do anything to get money. He also pays a lot of money for the capture of the Swiftnick Gang. In one of the episodes he sang Romeo and Juliet to a rich widow named Countess Cornocopia for money but was tricked by Swiftnick. Sir John is known to have a particularly bad reaction to shellfish, especially prawns. This reaction causes him to fart rudely and often, such as in "Love Hurts" where he does in front of Countess Cornocopia. In "Pants" he discourages Captain Watt ordering shellfish from the caterers once they believe to have captured Swiftnick.

Giles is Sir John's son, who has a crush on Lady Devereux but it is strictly one way. He takes lessons in flirting and fencing, although not showing the same aptitude for it as Lady Devereux. He will do anything to gain father's approval. Giles once sabotaged Lord Montague's kart during the village karting race.

=== Minor characters ===
Captain Watt is Sir John's right hand and his personal guard's captain. Watt is loyal to Sir John and was one of the main characters in the episode "Fools Day", when he told Sir John that an assassin was on his way to kill him for a joke, but Sir John thought it was true and dressed up as a peasant. Despite being loyal to sir John, Watt is actually quite pleasant most of the time and often seems dubious of his master's wisdom. Despite his loyalty even he considers some of Sir John actions despicable such as when he threatens to burn down the village, doesn't care Giles was kidnapped or tried to sell Lady D's only portrait of her parents.

Bardolph is a village man who appears in four episodes. The first appearance was in "Valentine" in which he is delivered a valentine by Tom. Bardolph confuses it with a brother he never had and because of it being addressed to "village idiot", he quickly realises this and exclaims "it must be for me!" and runs away ranting. In one occasion he became the new leader of the Swiftnick Gang when he saw Tom taking of his mask. He ends up being in the stocks and was going to tell John their real identities when he was stopped by Tom. Bardolph also took part in the village karting race in one episode of which he won. Bardolph became Sir John's mother's man servant.

Sir John's Mother appeared in one episode when she looked for a manservant in secret on a visit to the castle, and almost took Captain Watt but took Bardolph instead.

Food Tester is Sir John's servant. He tests the food Sir John was supposed to eat and finds something poisonous every time. His real age is 20 but because of how much poison he had consumed looked like 50.

Lord Montague is Giles's friend and in one episode was almost engaged with Lady Devereux. He also took part in the village karting race in which his kart was sabotaged by Giles and in turn sabotaged Giles' simultaneously.

Felix is the son of one of the richest widows in the country called Countess Cornucopia. He fancies Lady Devereux, which causes Tom to hate him. His mother is being courted by Sir John for money purposes only.

Countess Cornucopia is a rich widow which tempted Sir John to court her. She is the proud mother of Felix Cornucopia.

== Episode list ==
The following is a list of the episodes as they were aired on CITV. The final two episodes of series two were transmitted in the wrong order on CITV. They were switched around and transmitted in the correct order on other channels such as ABC and Nickelodeon.

=== First series ===
1. Evicted (22 October 2004)
2. Kidnapped (29 October 2004)
3. Betrayed (5 November 2004)
4. Fakes (12 November 2004)
5. Thief Taker (19 November 2004)
6. Valentine (26 November 2004)

=== Second series ===
1. Sheer Torture (4 January 2005)
2. Pants (11 January 2005)
3. Locked In (18 January 2005)
4. Fools' Gold (3 January 2006)
5. Swine Fever (24 January 2006)
6. The New Guy (31 January 2006)
7. Love Hurts (7 February 2006)

== Transmission and cancellation ==
The second series was shown in two halves, with the first three episodes being shown back-to-back with series one, making an initial run of 9 episodes. The final four episodes of series two were not transmitted on ITV until January 3, 2006 with episodes 2 and 3 from the first series airing the following two weeks, then afterwards transmitting the final three episodes made. A third series was never ordered due to the closure of ITV's children's in house production. Since the second series ended, the show has been repeated on a number of channels. It was repeated on the CITV channel until 2010. In Australia it has been repeated on ABC Kids, ABC Family and was last repeated on ABC TV between 29 January and 19 February 2013.
