= Interactive video =

The term interactive video usually refers to a technique used to blend interaction and linear film or video. Interactive video (also known as "IV") is a form of digital video that supports user interaction. Interactive videos provide the viewer the ability to click, on a desktop, or touch on mobile devices within the video for an action to occur. These clickable areas, or "hotspots," can perform an action when clicked or touched. For example, the video may display additional information, jump to a different part of the video or another video, or may change the storyline.

One popular use of interactive video technology is to add clickable points or 'hotspots' to the video, which allow the viewer to learn more about a particular object, product, or person in the video. A hotspot can trigger content to appear within the video such as text, images, videos or additional web content that can be set within an iframe.

== History ==
In 1962, Steve Russell, a student at the Massachusetts Institute of Technology (MIT), created Spacewar!, the world's first interactive computer game. The first interactive film, The Cinema Machine, was released in 1967. While watching this film, the audience in the cinema theatre would choose one of two scenes during the plot fork. Switching between scenes was done manually by the projectionist.

Philips introduced the first LaserDisc in 1972. LaserDisc technology allowed for playback of any video chapter, making interactive video possible. In 1983, Sega released Astron Belt, the first interactive arcade game on LaserDisc. Also released in 1983 was Cinematronics's LD animated Dragon's Lair. Several interactive Video CD formats, such as CD-i (Compact Disc-Interactive) and Digital Video Interactive (DVI), were available during the 1990s. The LaserDisc format has been superseded by the DVD format since 2000.

In 2008, YouTube added an interactive annotation feature to videos. This feature was disabled in 2019. Netflix started releasing interactive animations in 2016. TikTok announced support for interactive effects in 2021.

After discontinuing annotations in 2019, YouTube introduced end screens as a method for interactive video. End screens appear in the last 5–20 seconds of a video and allow creators to add clickable links to other videos, enabling branching narratives and interactive films on the platform.

=== Early computer games ===
The term interactive video or interactive movie sometimes refers to a nowadays-uncommon technique used to create computer games or interactive narratives. Instead of 3D computer graphics an interactive image flow is created using premade video clips, often produced by overlaying computer-generated material with 12-inch videodisc images (where the setup is known as "level III" interactive video, to distinguish it from "level I" or videodisc-only, and "level II" requiring specially made videodisc players that support handheld-remote-based interactivity without using an external computer setup). The clips can be animation like in the video game Dragon's Lair or live action video like in the video game Night Trap. Compared to other computer graphics techniques, interactive video tends to emphasize the looks and movement of interactive characters instead of interactivity.

== Types ==
=== Customizable ===
Customizable videos allow the user to adjust some variables and then play a video customised to the user's particular preferences. However the user does not actually interact with the video while it is playing. Recent examples of this form of video include:

- Miss Helga—customizable video ad for Volkswagen Golf created by Crispin Porter + Bogusky and The Barbarian Group.
- Ave a Word—customizable video ad for Mini created by Glue London - Silver Cannes Lion 2006.
- Electric Feel—customizable music video for the so-titled song by the band MGMT.

=== Conversational ===
Conversational videos allow the user to interact with a video in a turn-based manner, almost as though the user was having a simple conversation with the characters in the video. Recent examples include:

- Subservient Chicken - a "conversational" interactive video ad for Burger King created by Crispin Porter + Bogusky and The Barbarian Group Cannes Grand Prix 2005.
- A Conversation with Sir Ian - Interactive video interview with Sir Ian McKellen on Shakespeare. Created for the National Theatre by Martin Percy. BAFTA nominee 2007.
- A conversation with Shimon Peres the Israeli President, created by interactive media and tech company Eko.
- An interactive interview with John Hamm before he hosted the 2013 ESPY Awards, also created by Eko.

=== Exploratory ===
Exploratory videos allow the user to move through a space or look at an object such as an artwork from multiple angles, almost as though the user was looking at the object in real life. The object or space is depicted using video loops, not still, creating a more "live" feel. Recent examples include:

- The BT Series - Interactive video exploration of the works of Tracey Emin, Anthony Gormley and Rachel Whiteread. Created for the Tate Gallery by Martin Percy. Webby Nominee 2006 and Honoree 2007.
- Tate Tracks - Interactive video exploration of various works, allowing the user to listen to music while looking at art. Created for the Tate Gallery by Martin Percy. Part of integrated campaign winning Cannes Gold Lion 2007.

== Applications ==
=== YouTube ===
In 2008, YouTube added video annotations as an interactive layer of clickable speech-bubble, text boxes and spotlights. Users were able to add interactive annotations to their videos, and by that, a new trend of interactive videos arose, including choose-your-own-adventure video series, online video games using YouTube videos, spot-the-difference-game videos, animal-dubbing and more. In 2009, YouTube added a community aspect to its annotations feature by allowing video owners to invite their friends and community to add annotations to their movies.

Around 2010, YouTube released the interactive takeovers, certain channels had the opportunity to integrate an iFrame experience, enabling them to include interactive videos. Some of the most successful takeovers were done by brands such as Samsung, Tipp-Ex or Chrome.

YouTube discontinued the use of annotations on January 15, 2019.

After annotations were discontinued, the primary method for creating interactive videos on YouTube became end screens (also known as teasers). End screens appear in the last 5–20 seconds of a video and can contain up to four clickable elements, such as links to other videos or playlists. To create branching narratives, creators prepare videos with a 20-second pause at the end, upload them to YouTube, and configure end screens in YouTube Studio to link chapters together.

=== Advertising ===
In 2014, video marketing platform Innovid was awarded a U.S. patent for interactive video technology.

In 2017, the interactive video agency Adways created a specific format called InContent that enables to add interactive ads on a live stream for Roland-Garros.

=== Art ===
Contemporary interactive video artists like Miroslaw Rogala, Greyworld, Raymond Salvatore Harmon, Lee Wells, Camille Utterback, Scott Snibbe, and Alex Horn have extended the form of interactive video through the dialog of gesture and the participatory involvement of both active and passive viewers. Perpetual art machine is a video art portal and interactive video installation that integrates over 1000 international video artists into a single interactive large scale video experience.

=== VJing ===
Technically, VJing is also about creating a stream of video interactively. This involves the user/operator to mix video clips, runtime plugins, and FX to the music's mood, tempo, and vibe.

=== Research ===
The human-computer interaction (HCI) research community as well as the multimedia research community have published several works on video interaction tools. A survey is provided in

== See also ==
- Cybertext
- Hypermedia
- Interactive movies
- Interactive art
- LaserDisc
- Participatory cinema
