= Maddie's Do You Know? =

British television series for children

Maddie's Do You Know? (originally known as simply Do You Know? for its first two series) is a British children's television series, produced by Banijay subsidiary 7 Wonder for the BBC channel CBeebies, and presented by Maddie Moate. A third series aired in 2019, followed by a fourth in April 2020 running until September 2020. Maddie's Do You Know? is also available on BBC iPlayer for over a year.

== Overview ==
Maddie's Do You Know? is a series for young children in which sees Maddie explores the workings of everyday objects, by asking how they are made or how they work. She uses animations and cameras in this series.

== Episodes ==
=== Series overview ===
| Series | Episodes | | Originally released | |
| Series | Episodes | | First released | Last released |
|---|---|---|---|---|
| 1 | 25 | 15 | 5 September 2016 | 23 September 2016 |
| 1 | 25 | 10 | 24 October 2016 | 4 November 2016 |
| 2 | 25 | 15 | 3 April 2018 | 23 April 2018 |
| 2 | 25 | 10 | 10 September 2018 | 21 September 2018 |
| 3 | 25 | 15 | 29 April 2019 | 17 May 2019 |
| 3 | 25 | 10 | 9 September 2019 | 20 September 2019 |
| 4 | 20 | 15 | 20 April 2020 | 29 May 2020 |
| 4 | 20 | 5 | 14 September 2020 | 14 December 2020 |
| 5 | 3 | | 14 December 2020 | TBA |

=== Series 1 (2016) ===
| No. | Title | Directed by | Original release date |
|---|---|---|---|
| 1 | "Hamster Wheel and Insect Hotel" | Paul Kittel | 5 September 2016 |
Maddie meets some furry friends and creepy crawlies. She visits a pet shop and uses a night-vision camera to find out how a hamster wheel works and how far a hamster can run in a single night. Next, Maddie visits a factory to see how an insect hotel is made from wood and bamboo and uses a slow motion camera to show how a drill creates holes in the wood for the insects to hide in.
| 2 | "Fire Engine Hose and Reflective Strips" | Paul Kittel | 6 September 2016 |
Maddie looks at the emergency services. She finds out how the hose on a fire engine works and how the pump inside the fire engine creates pressure and sends water to the hose. Next, Maddie sees how an ordinary white car is made into a police car using blue and yellow reflective stickers. A microscope camera reveals the tiny prisms inside the stickers, which make them bright and shiny.
| 3 | "Fizzy Water and Yoghurt" | Paul Kittel | 7 September 2016 |
Maddie looks at food and drink. She uses a slow-motion camera to find out how bubbles get inside a bottle of fizzy water. Animation shows how gas is used to create the bubbles and then keep them 'hidden' until the bottle is opened. Next, Maddie visits a dairy to see how milk is collected from cows and taken to a factory in a tanker. She then sees how the factory turns the milk into yoghurt.
| 4 | "Bin Lorry and Newspaper" | Paul Kittel | 8 September 2016 |
Maddie does the recycling. She uses a camera to find out how a bin lorry works to lift a bin and tip the rubbish into the hopper. An animation reveals how a moving wall inside the lorry crushes the rubbish to make way for more. Next, Maddie visits a recycling plant to see how the rubbish is sorted. She then visits a paper mill to see how the old paper is recycled into newspapers.
| 5 | "Bike Chain and Tennis Ball" | Paul Kittel | 9 September 2016 |
Maddie is outside being active. She uses a camera to find out how the chain on a bicycle works to turn the wheels and how the front wheel and handlebars are used to steer. Next, Maddie visits a factory to see how rubber, collected from trees, is made into tennis balls using a series of heavy presses. A microscopic camera reveals the special material used to cover the tennis balls with a furry coat.
| 6 | "Cat Flap and Woolly Hat" | Paul Kittel | 12 September 2016 |
Maddie meets some furry friends. She uses cameras to find out how a digital cat flap works and how a tiny microchip unlocks the cat flap so the cats can go in and out of the house. Next, Maddie visits a sheep farm to see how a fleece is sheared from a sheep. She then goes to a mill to see how the fleece is washed, spun and dyed and turned into wool. The finished wool is then knitted into a woolly hat.
| 7 | "Boat Propeller and Hot Air Balloon" | Paul Kittel | 13 September 2016 |
Maddie is out and about exploring different ways to travel. She uses an underwater camera to see a boat propeller in action and an animation reveals how the propeller pushes the boat through the water. Next, Maddie visits a factory to see how a hot air balloon is made from many pieces of material sewn together. She then joins a balloon team outside to take a ride in a finished hot air balloon.
| 8 | "Blood Pressure Monitor and Cast" | Paul Kittel | 14 September 2016 |
Maddie visits a hospital. She uses a special light to see the blood vessels under her skin and finds out how a blood pressure monitor works to check that blood is flowing freely around our bodies. Maddie then visits the plaster room and shows how a cast is made by having one put on her arm. She uses a microscope camera to reveal how the fibreglass strands are woven together to make the cast strong.
| 9 | "Hot Water and Toothpaste" | Paul Kittel | 15 September 2016 |
Maddie is preparing for bath time. She uses a thermal imaging camera to find out how the hot water system in a house works, and then visits a reservoir to see where the water comes from, and how it is sent to our homes. She then visits a toothpaste factory to see how toothpaste is made from different ingredients and uses a slow motion camera to find out how the stripes get inside a tube of stripy toothpaste.
| 10 | "Water Park and Ice Cream Cone" | Paul Kittel | 16 September 2016 |
Maddie goes for a fun day out. She visits an indoor water park and uses a waterproof camera and animation to show how a water slide works. She then goes underneath the swimming pool to see what happens inside the pump room to pump the water to the top of the slide. Next, Maddie visits a factory to see how ice cream cones are made from a type of batter and how hot plates are used to create the criss-cross waffle pattern.
| 11 | "Popcorn and Pasta" | Paul Kittel | 19 September 2016 |
Maddie explores some favourite foods. She uses a slow-motion camera to find out why popcorn pops. An animation shows what popcorn is made of and how a water droplet hidden inside each kernel of corn expands as it is cooked, making it pop. Next, Maddie visits a pasta factory to see how flour is mixed with water and turned into pasta dough and how special cutters are used to create different pasta shapes.
| 12 | "Helicopter Rotor and Tricycle" | Paul Kittel | 20 September 2016 |
Maddie is out and about exploring different ways to travel. She visits an airfield and uses a camera to find out how the rotor works to help make a helicopter fly. An animation shows how changing the angle of the rotor blades makes the helicopter go forwards and backwards. Next, Maddie visits a workshop to see how a tricycle is constructed from a big box of parts and to see how the tricycle can be adapted to suit a user's needs.
| 13 | "Toilet Flush and Toilet" | Paul Kittel | 21 September 2016 |
Maddie is in the bathroom. She uses an underwater camera to find out how a toilet flush works and why it makes a gurgling sound. An animation shows how the float ball and plug work together to refill the cistern after it has flushed. Next, Maddie visits a toilet factory to see how toilets are made from clay and how robots spray the toilets with a special paint to make them waterproof and shiny.
| 14 | "Carousel and Wax Crayons" | Paul Kittel | 22 September 2016 |
Maddie goes for a fun day out. She visits a fairground and goes for a ride on a carousel, using a camera to find out how it works. An animation shows how the carousel goes round and how the crankshaft works to move the horses up and down. Next, Maddie visits a factory to see how different coloured wax crayons are made from paraffin oil and how a big mould creates hundreds of crayons in one go.
| 15 | "Crane and Bricks" | Paul Kittel | 23 September 2016 |
Maddie visits a building site. She uses a camera to see how a big crane works to move heavy objects from one place to another. An animation shows how the hydraulic mechanism, hidden inside the boom arm, enables the crane to extend high into the sky. Next, Maddie visits a factory to see how bricks are made from clay, shaped by rectangular moulds, and then fired in hot kilns for several days to make them strong.
Part 2
| 16 | "Lock and Key and Glass" | Paul Kittel | 24 October 2016 |
Maddie explores the house. She uses a camera and animation to see how a key works inside a lock and shows how the hidden barrel and pins inside the lock work, to allow the matching key to unlock it. Next, Maddie shows how sand is made into glass. She visits a glass blowing workshop to see how sand is turned into molten glass and then worked by the glass maker into a brightly coloured glass vase.
| 17 | "Piano and Drums" | Paul Kittel | 25 October 2016 |
Maddie looks at musical instruments. She uses a slow-motion camera to find out how a piano works and how the keys on the piano are attached to levers and hammers. She shows how the strings inside the piano vibrate to produce musical notes. Next, Maddie visits a factory to see how a drum is made from many thin wooden sheets pressed together and shaped in a circular mould.
| 18 | "Bus Ramps and Roads" | Paul Kittel | 26 October 2016 |
Maddie is out and about exploring different ways to travel. She uses a special camera to find out how a bus ramp works to help people get on and off the bus. An animation shows how the ramp is hidden in a compartment underneath the doors and how airbags allow the bus to lower on one side. Next, Maddie joins a road-building team to see how a motorway is made of different layers and uses a thermal imaging camera to see how the hot asphalt is laid.
| 19 | "Dishwasher and Table" | Paul Kittel | 27 October 2016 |
Maddie uses a waterproof camera to find out how the dishwasher works.
| 20 | "Eggs and Bread" | Paul Kittel | 28 October 2016 |
Maddie is making breakfast in the kitchen. She visits a farm to see where eggs come from and uses a thermal imaging camera to show why eggs change colour when they are cooked. Next, Maddie visits a mill to see how kernels of wheat are ground and turned into flour. She then visits a factory to find out how the flour is made into different types of bread and baked in a very large oven.
| 21 | "Magnets and Teddy Bears" | Paul Kittel | 31 October 2016 |
Maddie is looking at toys. She uses a slow motion camera to find out how the magnets on a train set work. An animation shows how the north and south poles on magnets work and why a magnetic field can pull magnets together or push them apart. Maddie visits a factory to see how teddy bears are made, with eyes, ears and joints, and uses a microscope camera to see the fibres of the stuffing.
| 22 | "Escalator and Wheelbarrow" | Paul Kittel | 1 November 2016 |
Maddie is at a shopping centre. She uses cameras to find out how an escalator works to move people from one floor to another. An animation shows the hidden cogs and chains inside the escalator which make the steps move. Maddie visits a factory to see how wheelbarrows are made from metal sheets to help people move heavy things around outside. She attaches a camera to a big robot to see it working.
| 23 | "Car Brakes and Car" | Paul Kittel | 2 November 2016 |
Maddie goes for a drive in the car. She uses a microscope camera to find out how car brakes work. An animation shows how the brake pedal is connected to the brake discs and pads and how they move to slow down and stop the car. Next, Maddie visits a factory to see how a car is made from a large roll of steel sheeting. She uses cameras to show how robots work with people to put the different parts of the cars together.
| 24 | "Zips and Screen Printing" | Paul Kittel | 3 November 2016 |
Maddie looks at clothes. She uses a microscope camera to look at the zip on her hoodie. An animation shows how the slider works to pull the two rows of teeth together to close the zip. Next, Maddie visits a workshop to see how a dinosaur picture is screen printed onto a T Shirt. Her special microscope camera shows how a stencil, created on a screen, allows the ink to pass through and create the design.
| 25 | "Cake and Soft Play" | Paul Kittel | 4 November 2016 |
Maddie is getting ready for a party. She uses a camera and animation to find out how cake ingredients work together to make cake sponges rise in the oven. Next, Maddie visits a factory to see how a soft play centre is made. She uses a special microscope camera to look at the foam stuffing and sees how all the pieces are sewn together to make play shapes. Finally, she sees how an airbrush is used to make the wings of a rocking parrot.

=== Series 2 (2018) ===
| No. | Title | Directed by | Original release date |
|---|---|---|---|
| 26 | "Shipping Container and Bubble Packaging" | Paul Kittel | 3 April 2018 |
Maddie finds out how things that we use every day are brought to us on big ships and moved around the country in shipping containers on trains. She visits a shipping port and uses a special camera attached to the shipping containers to find out what happens when they are lifted on a big crane. Next, Maddie visits a bubble packaging factory and uses a special slow motion camera to show how the air gets trapped inside the bubble packaging when it is made.
| 27 | "Umbrella and Car Wash" | Paul Kittel | 4 April 2018 |
Maddie takes a car through an automatic car wash to find out how the computer uses sensors to tell the robotic car wash how to wash the car, and she uses a special waterproof camera to see the big brushes in action. Next, Maddie heads to an umbrella factory to see how umbrellas are made using waterproof material. She uses a special slow motion camera to show how the water droplets bounce off the waterproof material to keep us dry.
| 28 | "Ice Rink and Bouncy Castle" | Paul Kittel | 5 April 2018 |
Maddie uses a special thermal camera at an ice rink to find out how runny water freezes to make solid ice we can skate on. Next, Maddie heads to a bouncy castle factory to see how a bouncy castle is made from many different coloured pieces of material sewn together. She then has a go at bouncing when the finished jungle themed bouncy castle is inflated and brought to life.
| 29 | "Clock and Cutlery" | Paul Kittel | 6 April 2018 |
Maddie heads to a clock factory and uses a special time lapse camera to show how the hands on the clock move around. Maddie also looks inside a battery powered clock to see how they work. We see the tiny cogs that turn each of the hands so we can tell the time. Next, it's dinner time and Maddie visits a cutlery workshop to see how sheets of metal are made into forks. With a special microscope camera, we find out how the patterns are made using a special machine.
| 30 | "Opticians and Glasses" | Paul Kittel | 9 April 2018 |
Maddie visits an optician to see how an eye test works by having one herself. She reads the charts and shapes on the wall and looks into a special camera that takes a picture of the back of our eyes to make sure they are healthy. Then, Maddie shows us how glasses frames are made by shaping gold wire at a factory. Maddie uses a special microscope camera to show us the ant sized screws that hold glasses together.
| 31 | "Sleeping Bag and Mattress" | Paul Kittel | 10 April 2018 |
It's bedtime and Maddie is finding out about different things we sleep on and in! At a campsite she uses a special thermal camera to show how the layers in a sleeping bag work by trapping warm air inside to keep us warm. Next, Maddie visits a mattress factory to see how a mattress is made from layers of foam and material, a bit like a giant sandwich! She uses a special camera to see the tiny holes in the sponge that make the mattress nice and soft for us to lie on.
| 32 | "Canal Lock and Gate" | Paul Kittel | 11 April 2018 |
| 33 | "Train Tracks and Paint" | Paul Kittel | 12 April 2018 |
| 34 | "Hand Wash and Vacuum Cleaner" | Paul Kittel | 13 April 2018 |
| 35 | "Lifeboat and Concrete" | Paul Kittel | 16 April 2018 |
| 36 | "Aeroplane and Trainers" | Paul Kittel | 17 April 2018 |
| 37 | "Traffic Lights and Emergency Lights" | Paul Kittel | 18 April 2018 |
| 38 | "Hair Clippers and Ballet Shoes" | Paul Kittel | 19 April 2018 |
| 39 | "Playground and Plant Pot" | Paul Kittel | 20 April 2018 |
| 40 | "Disco Ball and Jigsaw Puzzle" | Paul Kittel | 23 April 2018 |
Part 2
| 41 | "Posting a Letter and Colouring Pencils" | Paul Kittel | 10 September 2018 |
| 42 | "Bubbles and Chocolate" | Paul Kittel | 11 September 2018 |
| 43 | "Lift and Space Suit" | Paul Kittel | 12 September 2018 |
| 44 | "Television and Carpet" | Paul Kittel | 13 September 2018 |
| 45 | "Kite and Electricity" | Paul Kittel | 14 September 2018 |
| 46 | "Fish Tank and Bath" | Paul Kittel | 17 September 2018 |
| 47 | "Hand Dryer and Toilet Roll" | Paul Kittel | 18 September 2018 |
| 48 | "Prosthetic Leg and Detection Dog" | Paul Kittel | 19 September 2018 |
| 49 | "Barcode and Fish Cakes" | Paul Kittel | 20 September 2018 |
| 50 | "Fridge and Mushrooms" | Paul Kittel | 21 September 2018 |

=== Series 3 (2019) ===
| No. | Title | Directed by | Original release date |
|---|---|---|---|
| 51 | "Skyscraper and Bird" | Paul Kittel | 29 April 2019 |
| 52 | "Plant and Compost" | Paul Kittel | 30 April 2019 |
| 53 | "Car Engine and Car Transporter" | Paul Kittel | 1 May 2019 |
| 54 | "Day and Night and Solar Panel" | Paul Kittel | 2 May 2019 |
| 55 | "Singing and Trombone" | Paul Kittel | 3 May 2019 |
| 56 | "Bridge and Playground Flooring" | Paul Kittel | 6 May 2019 |
| 57 | "Butterfly and Wallpaper" | Paul Kittel | 7 May 2019 |
| 58 | "Digger and Wellies" | Paul Kittel | 8 May 2019 |
| 59 | "Hearing Aid and Whistle" | Paul Kittel | 9 May 2019 |
| 60 | "Wind-Up Toy and Cricket Bat" | Paul Kittel | 10 May 2019 |
| 61 | "Cereal and Potato Harvester" | Paul Kittel | 13 May 2019 |
| 62 | "Bowling Alley and Ribbon" | Paul Kittel | 14 May 2019 |
| 63 | "Beehive and Mug" | Paul Kittel | 15 May 2019 |
| 64 | "Digestion and Meringue" | Paul Kittel | 16 May 2019 |
| 65 | "Clouds and Rain and Radiator" | Paul Kittel | 17 May 2019 |
Part 2
| 66 | "Metal Recycling Centre and Road Sign" | Paul Kittel | 9 September 2019 |
| 67 | "Lighthouse and Bathbomb" | Paul Kittel | 10 September 2019 |
| 68 | "Waves and Ice Cream" | Paul Kittel | 11 September 2019 |
| 69 | "Library and Book" | Paul Kittel | 12 September 2019 |
| 70 | "X-Ray and Sock" | Paul Kittel | 13 September 2019 |
| 71 | "Tram and Map" | Paul Kittel | 16 September 2019 |
| 72 | "Spider Web and Watering Can" | Paul Kittel | 17 September 2019 |
| 73 | "Camera and Hair Brush" | Paul Kittel | 18 September 2019 |
| 74 | "Sleep and Sofa" | Paul Kittel | 19 September 2019 |
| 75 | "Washing Machine and Jeans" | Paul Kittel | 20 September 2019 |

=== Series 4 (2020) ===
| No. | Title | Directed by | Original release date |
|---|---|---|---|
| 76 | "Starlight and Stop-Frame Animation" | Paul Kittel | 20 April 2020 |
| 77 | "Bird’s Nest and Helmet" | Paul Kittel | 21 April 2020 |
| 78 | "Electric Car and Wind" | Paul Kittel | 22 April 2020 |
| 79 | "Hula Hoop and Tent" | Paul Kittel | 23 April 2020 |
| 80 | "Drinking Water and Carrots" | Paul Kittel | 24 April 2020 |
| 81 | "Radio Telescope and Maze" | Paul Kittel | 27 April 2020 |
| 82 | "Bike Bell and Line Markings" | Paul Kittel | 28 April 2020 |
| 83 | "Floating and Sand" | Paul Kittel | 29 April 2020 |
| 84 | "Road Sweeper and Paper Straw" | Paul Kittel | 30 April 2020 |
| 85 | "Glass Recycling and Jam" | Paul Kittel | 1 May 2020 |
| 86 | "Snail and Tractor" | Paul Kittel | 25 May 2020 |
| 87 | "Cleaning Window Cradle and Shadow" | Paul Kittel | 25 May 2020 |
| 88 | "Kaleidoscope and Envelope" | Paul Kittel | 25 May 2020 |
| 89 | "Neon Sign and Revolving Door" | Paul Kittel | 25 May 2020 |
| 90 | "Climbing Wall and Modelling Clay" | Paul Kittel | 25 May 2020 |
| 91 | "Forklift Truck and Dried Fruit" | Paul Kittel | 1 June 2020 |
| 92 | "Car Ferry and Globe" | Paul Kittel | 1 June 2020 |
| 93 | "Airport Baggage and Rucksack" | Paul Kittel | 1 June 2020 |
| 94 | "Lamp and Playhouse" | Paul Kittel | 1 June 2020 |
| 95 | "Speaker and Colour" | Paul Kittel | 1 June 2020 |

=== Series 5 (2020-2021) ===
| No. | Title | Directed by | Original release date |
|---|---|---|---|
| 96 | "Reindeer and Christmas Decorations" | Paul Kittel | 14 December 2020 |
| 97 | "Cable Car and Viewing Tower" | Paul Kittel | 30 May 2021 |
| 98 | "Farming Robots and 3D Printer" | Paul Kittel | 29 August 2021 |

== Spin-off series ==
Maddie, the Zoo and You was broadcast in 2020, and featured five episodes. It was followed by a sequel series of five episodes in 2021, Maddie, Space and You another five episode sequel series was in Maddie the Plants and you followed by Maddie, the Home and You. Maddie, the Zoo and You is also available on BBC iPlayer for over a year.
