= Holly Bodimeade =

English actress

- Born: Chichester, West Sussex, England
- Occupation: Actress
- Years active: 2006–present

Holly Bodimeade is an English actress.

== Early life ==
Born in Chichester, West Sussex, Bodimeade was a pupil at Stonar School in Wiltshire.

=== Theatre and Training ===
A member of the National Youth Theatre since age 14, with stage roles including Marriage Blanc, Love on the Dole, Yerma, The House of Bernarda Alba, and An Inspector Calls.

Trained at UK institutions including RADA, Bristol Old Vic Theatre School, Guildhall School of Music & Drama, and Fourth Monkey Theatre Company, with additional training in the US.

== Career ==
She made her screen acting debut in the 2007 short film Hedgewitch. In the first decade of the 2000s, she starred in two British radio dramas: The Elegance of the Hedgehog (as Paloma) and BBC Radio 4’s Sand (as Elizabeth).

Bodimeade starred in her first lead role as Maddy in the BAFTA-nominated BBC TV drama Summerhill, about the radical school of the same name.

She went on to appear as Megan in two seasons of the CBBC TV series "Paradise Cafe" filmed in New Zealand and the Cook Islands. She has also played lead roles in two BBC Radio 4 drama productions.

Beyond her lead roles, she appeared in guest episodes of Doctors (2014), Casualty (2015), The Coroner (2015), and Father Brown (2017). She has also acted in short films and BBC Radio 4 productions.

== Filmography ==
=== Television ===
| Year | Title | Role | Notes |
|---|---|---|---|
| 2008 | Summerhill | Maddy | Shown on CBBC and BBC Four |
| 2009–2012 | Paradise Café | Megan | 26 episodes CBBC |
| 2014 | Doctors | Bethany Craig | Episode 16.15 "Viral" |
| 2015 | Casualty | Laura Melling | Episode 29.30 "The Rita Supremacy" |
| 2015 | The Coroner | Leah Walker | Episode 1.7 "The Salcombe Selkie" |
| 2017 | Father Brown | Ada Rawlins | Episode 5.9 "The Lepidopterist's Companion" |
| 2020 | Cursed (2020 TV series) | Faun Scott | Episode 1.8 "The Fey Queen" |
| 2025 | Murder most puzzling (2025) | Hendrix & Son Receptionist | Episode 1.3 |

=== Film ===
| Year | Title | Role | Notes |
|---|---|---|---|
| 2007 | Hedgewitch | Bully | Short |
| 2010 | Sherry Red Shoes | Sherry Levitt | Short |
| 2013 | Fruits of Labour | Girl | Short |
| 2014 | Con Buenas Intenciones | Katy | Short |

=== Radio ===
| Year | Title | Role | Notes |
|---|---|---|---|
| 2006 | BBC Radio 4's Sand | Elizabeth Gooding | Afternoon play |
| 2009 | The Elegance of the Hedgehog | Paloma | Woman's Hour series |
| 2011 | The Queen's Nose | Melody Parker | BBC Radio 4 Extra |
| 2012 | Witch Week | Karen Grigg | BBC Radio 4 Extra |
