= Eliot Otis Brown Walters =

British child actor

- Born: Eliot Otis Brown Walters; 4 February 1993 (age 33); Nottingham, England
- Occupation: Actor
- Years active: 2002–present

Eliot Otis Brown Walters (born 4 February 1993) is a British actor, known for his role as Ryan in the BBC television drama Summerhill about the school by the same name.

== Career ==
Eliot started acting when he was eight and has been a member of the Central Junior Television Workshop (which also produced Oscar-nominated film star Samantha Morton) ever since. His first starring role was in 2002, where he was featured in the movie Once Upon a Time in the Midlands. In 2004, Eliot had his second starring role in children's drama, Help! I'm a Teenage Outlaw shot in Czech Republic but he had to have his appendix removed two weeks into filming. In 2006, Eliot had a guest appearance in Murphy's Law and in 2007 Eliot had another guest appearance in the film Control. In 2008, Eliot landed the role of Ryan in BAFTA Award-winning children's drama, Summerhill and he subsequently won the Children's BAFTA Award in the category Breakthrough Talent for his role in the series. He received the award from Keith Chegwin and George Sampson at a ceremony in London on 30 November 2008 and dedicated it to his family and acting workshop. In 2009, Eliot landed another starring role as Daz in the film Butterfly. Since appearing in Summerhill, he has had numerous guest roles in The Bill, Doctors and Casualty between 2008 and 2010. He briefly appeared in 2011 Kids TV series The Sparticle Mystery as character Jed. He can currently be seen in the E4 TV series My Mad Fat Diary as Big G, a bully and nemesis to the main character, Rae.

== Filmography ==
=== Film ===
Year	Title	Role	Notes
2002	Once Upon a Time in the Midlands	Lake	Supporting Role
2007	Control	Footballing Kid	Minor Role
2009	Butterfly	Daz	Main Role

=== Television ===
Year	Title	Role	Notes
2004–2006	Help! I'm a Teenage Outlaw	Moses	Main Role
2008	Summerhill	Ryan	Main Role

=== Guest appearances ===
Year	Title	Role	Notes
2006	Murphy's Law	Kid with CPS Report	Series 4, Episode 2
2008	The Bill	Ethan Ford	Episode: "Witness: Deadly Secret"
2008	Doctors	Sean Roland	Episode: "You'll Be a Man, My Son"
2008	Casualty	Danny Malone	Episode: "Farmead Menace: Part 2"
2010	Doctors	Kevin Roscoe	Episode: "Save the Children"
2011	The Sparticle Mystery	Jed	Episode 12: "The Emergency"
2013	My Mad Fat Diary	Big G	
