= Bin Weevils =

Discontinued British MMO video game

- Developer: Bin Weevils Limited (20 April 2007 to 19 August 2014); 55 Pixels Ltd (19 August 2014 - liquidation remaining)
- Type: Massive multiplayer online game
- Launched: 24 September 2007; 19 years ago
- Discontinued: 16 January 2021; 5 years ago
- Platform: Web browsers
- Operating systems: macOS, Linux, Windows (XP, Vista, 7, 8, 10)
- Status: Discontinued

Bin Weevils was a British MMO with a virtual world containing various online games and activities. It was created by Jon Turner and Myke Crosby, co-founded by Amelia Johnson and launched in October 2003 as a 50/50 joint venture between Nickelodeon UK, Prism Entertainment Ltd and CEG (Creative Entertainment Group).

Initially owned by Nickelodeon UK, the game was hosted on the Nickelodeon website from 2003 to 2007. During this time, brief animated clips based on characters from the game aired on TV in 2006. By September 17, 2007, ownership had transferred to Bin Weevils Limited, although it continued to be hosted on the Nickelodeon platform. In September 2007, Bin Weevils was relaunched as its own standalone website, officially operated by Bin Weevils Limited.

Bin Weevils was previously ranked as one of the most visited virtual world websites in the United Kingdom, reaching over 20 million users in 2013. Bin Weevils had 2 million monthly users in 2013. The game's publisher, 55 Pixels, filed for voluntary liquidation in December 2020. The website was taken offline on January 16, 2021, after Adobe Flash was discontinued.

== Gameplay ==
Bin Weevils was inspired by insects, specifically weevils. Each player possessed a "Nest", where they could modify the colour and design of their rooms using various items and decorations. Players had the option to enhance their nests to include up to eight rooms by utilising the Mulch currency through a membership. Players could also decorate their nest by arranging room items purchased from the "Shopping Mall," with Nestco serving as the primary retail shopping department. Nestco featured over 18 categories of items, the Nestige Range, and a showroom. Items could be sold by players in exchange for the Mulch currency. The nest included amenities such as a private cinema, a plaza, a garden, a nest generator, and a Bin Bot Portal. Additionally, every player had a "Bin Card" which they could stamp daily to earn rewards. These included item vouchers, exclusive seeds, Experience Points (XP), Dosh, Mulch, puzzle pieces, and various other benefits. Completing a puzzle with the collected pieces unlocked rare nest items.

Plazas were situated beneath a user's Nest and housed five virtual enterprises. Among these was a photo studio, allowing members to decorate their photo studios with various props, cutouts, decorations, and backdrops for other users to utilise for photography. Players had the option to frame their photographs in a variety of styles, which they could then display in their nest rooms. A Bin Tycoon would generate income at the Cash Machines for each photo frame sold. Additionally, the plazas included four nightclub party rooms, where members could decorate with various party supplies. For every customer attracted from the Plaza Directory outside the Shopping Mall, members would receive earnings at the Cash Machines. Players would also earn Experience Points for using a Plaza for a period of time.

Players could receive additional earnings at Cash Machines for creating magazines and racing tracks. Players had the opportunity to assume the role of a journalist and could create weekly magazines that featured images captured with their personal Bin Tycoon Camera. They could write and personalise their magazine issues with stickers, fonts, colours, and image and page sizes. The Weevil Wheels Track Builder located in Dirt Valley enabled members to conceptualise and manage a racing track businesses. Members could craft their own racing tracks featuring 3D elements for other players to enjoy. Magazines and racing tracks could be rated by other members, with players receiving additional earnings for these creations based on the ratings given to them by other players.

Players could travel to various regions of the game world through the Map. This world comprised 15 key areas available for exploration: Flum's Fountain, Lab's Lab, Dosh's Palace, Castle Gam, Rigg's Movie Multiplex, Sink's Sub, Rum's Airport, Tink's Tree, Gong's Pipenest, Club Fling, Dirt Valley, Figg's Cafe, Shopping Mall, Bin Pet Paradise, and Flem Manor. Certain locations required players to attain SWS Membership (Secret Agent) for access. Additionally, the Summer Fair served as a seasonal pop-up venue where players could engage in fairground mini-games to earn 'Tokens' and acquire prizes for their nests from the Prize Huts. Attractions at the Summer Fair included the Gunge Tent, the Funhouse, Ram's Arcade, Fab's Fortune Teller, Duck Soaker, Bin The Ball, Spin The Wheel, Weekly Challenge Tent, Gong's Hammer, Bin Pet Bounce, and Gam's Cannon.

There were numerous smaller sections that included zones dedicated to various single and multiplayer games, as well as missions, quests, shopping, and other activities. There were leaderboards on many games. Several shops were available for players to acquire items using either of Bin Weevils' two currencies: "Mulch" and "Dosh." Mulch could be obtained through gameplay, while Dosh served as a premium currency, earned by achieving the status of a Bin Tycoon, purchasing Dosh top-up bundles, or viewing advertisements. Additionally, there were various educational games, including the "Daily Brain Strain," which gave players a daily challenge with a range of questions in maths, geography, and puzzles. Participants in the 60-second challenge received Mulch and Experience Points based on their performance. Players could also enter Mystery Codes at the Mystery Code Machine to claim gifts.

Every user had a garden next to their nest. They could buy seeds from the Garden Shop, grow them, and harvest them to get Mulch and XP. Users could spend money on more seeds, and the XP they earned helped them level up. Each seed required daily or hourly watering and care cycles. Gardens could be made bigger to deluxe or super deluxe versions. There were 80 levels total, with new levels added often. Each level gave access to new items to buy and new features, plus Special Moves or upgrades to Special Moves.

Players with a premium membership could adopt a virtual pet called a "Bin Pet". A Bin Pet had its own unique profile and items. Care for the Bin Pet involved feeding and training it to perform tricks such as juggling, fetching, spinning, waving, and jumping. Players could also teach their Bin Pet to climb onto their avatar, allowing it to explore the game world alongside them or ride on their back. Interacting with other Bin Pets enhanced a Bin Pet's fitness and endurance. Additionally, Bin Pets could acquire skills and mimic other Bin Pets, including gestures such as waving, jumping, and juggling. A well-trained Bin Pet demonstrated its abilities and tricks at a higher speed. Each trick and skill associated with the Bin Pet was characterised by distinct levels, progress indicators, star ratings, and various juggling training pathways. Players could access over 30 commands for their Bin Pets, along with multiple training routes that offered hundreds of juggling levels to unlock, including professional and elite tiers. The Bin Pet profile served as a hub for players to monitor their pet's nutrition, vitality, fitness, and endurance metrics. Non-paying players had the option to select and care for a virtual pet for 24 hours, a feature known as "Pet For A Day".

== Membership ==
Bin Tycoon was a membership that unlocked gameplay elements such as in game items and activities. Many who subscribed to a premium membership received a monthly Dosh wage that gradually increased based on how many months a player had a premium membership. With this salary, the player could purchase hats for their character, items and clothing for their virtual pet, access exclusive items, and more.

The currency "Dosh" was introduced in 2012 and replaced high Mulch prices in many areas, although it requires real currency payment. Occasionally, players could take part in challenges, watch advertisements, or enter codes to earn the currency. It was possible to become a paying member for 1 month with an SMS text in the early stages of the game, but this was discontinued in 2013. Players were still able to buy the non-premium currency, Mulch, from the subscription section until 2013, the highest amount being £14.99 for 75,000 Mulch. Once the sale of Mulch was discontinued, Dosh was the only currency to buy on the membership page. Bin Weevils revealed in 2015 that 90% of the content on the site was free to play and 90% of their audience was non-paying members.

== Safety and communication ==
Bin Weevils represented the kidSAFE seal on their website. Additionally, the company stated that players' chat and buddy messages were moderated 24/7 to prevent the exchange of personal information or inappropriate language. The moderation system was based on a ticket method, according to the Bin Weevils support page. When a player used an offensive term, live moderators were notified and a punishment was imposed on the player's account that ranged from one day to a permanent suspension.

== Other ==
=== Merchandise ===
Bin Weevils signed a licensing agreement to launch a game-based merchandise range with the toy manufacturer Character Options. The merchandise consisted of a trading card game, books, clothing sets, backpacks, figurines, and toys which launched in October 2012.

In January 2012, it was announced that Bin Weevils would be releasing a magazine based on the game, which would be published by Egmont Publishing Group. The magazine featured offers of free in-game rewards, competitions of "Best Nest" hosted by Glamm, and "Great Gardens" hosted by Mudd. The magazine would be advertised across CITV and Nickelodeon. Bin Weevils co-founder, Amelia Johnson, was quoted as saying, "Our loyal BinWeevils.com fan base of over 2 million kids is looking to interact with their favorite characters, games, puzzles on a daily basis across a wide range of mediums. Our exciting partnership with Egmont and the launch of the BinWeevils.com monthly magazine allows them to connect with the brand in yet another compelling and enriching entertainment format."

Bin Weevils partnered with Sony in December 2012, releasing a music album entitled "Bin Tunes". A competition, in collaboration with Aardman Animations, was held, and four children were chosen to produce a music video for the song "So Much Better With Two", which featured on the Bin Tunes album. The album was launched on 29 July 2013 with a track-list of 12 children's songs. In November 2013, Bin Weevils partnered with WellChild to help raise money for sick children in the United Kingdom. Users could buy a Bin Weevils T-shirt and choose the design they wanted on their clothes, with 20 percent of every sale going to WellChild.

==== Bin Bots ====
Bin Weevils launched collectable creatures known as Bin Bots in October 2012. Each Bin Bot had its own unique name, personality, backstory and character. Bin Bot collectable figures launched in UK supermarkets with codes to unlock virtual goods online. By reaching high levels on the mobile app Tink's Blocks, exclusive Bin Bots were earned. Bin Bots were housed in a player's Bin Bot Portal. Certain Bin Bots could be placed in a microscopic world with zoom in features. Players could obtain a mystery Bin Bot online at the Claw Machine and mix potion bottle combinations together at the Bin Bot Maker to obtain the Bin Bot creatures. Both machines were invented by the scientist Lab and were located online outside his laboratory. Members could swap microscopic Bin Bots with other players in the Bin Bot Portal to complete their collections.

=== Apps ===
==== Tink's Blocks ====
A mobile app version of Tink's Blocks was released in December 2012, inspired by the popular online puzzle game at Mulch Island. Completing all levels unlocked collectible Bin Bot creatures online. Players could pick up three exclusive collectible Bin Bots by completing all the levels in Beat the Clock Mode. They could also earn bonus Mulch and Experience Points every day on Tink's Blocks for their weevil. There was a high score leaderboard and several levels.

==== Meet The Bin Weevils ====
Meet The Bin Weevils was released in December 2012. The mobile app featured over 80 characters and their family lines, character fact files, character galleries with artwork, and exclusive extended cartoon episodes.

==== Weevil World ====
55 Pixels Ltd released a beta version of a new game called "Weevil World" in May 2017, which was only available for paying members at the time. The game was released to all players a month later. The game was a multiplayer unity app for mobile devices and computers, allowing players to cross-play between Weevil World and Bin Weevils using the same account. After signing up, players could customize their weevil profile and navigate their character around the island. Players could purchase character clothing, gift items, level up, earn Gems and Dosh to buy nest decorations in the game and invite players to get a nest rating.

==== Farm Craft ====
55 Pixels Ltd released ''Farm Craft'' in July 2016. The world allows players to farm exotic plants, collect helpers, craft items, decorate houses and trade. Many core elements of the app were inspired by Bin Weevils.

==== Bin Weevils Connect ====
On 23 August 2016, a new app named "Bin Weevils Connect" was revealed. Bin Weevils Connect was an app which complemented Bin Weevils features such as the friend list, customizing the created character, playing multiplayer games with friends at quick access, and sending friend messages.

== Reception ==
In 2015, the Advertising Standard Authority (ASA) requested Bin Weevils to change the wording of their in-app advertisements, stating that players were under pressure to purchase items in the game. 55 Pixels Ltd, the company which operates the game, said that "as soon as [we] were made aware of the complaint made to the Advertising Standards Authority about a potential breach, and once we had understood the area for concern, we changed all our membership pages to comply with their recommendations. [The ASA] subsequently upheld the complaint about the original wording but referenced that we now complied, in the text of the ruling."

In September 2014, Bin Weevils suffered a data breach culminating in unauthorized access to some accounts. Bin Weevils had been alerted of the vulnerability and had taken the website down for a week to carry out security maintenance. A captcha was added to the website during the breach, which users had to verify before they could proceed.

== Awards ==
Bin Weevils was nominated for the BAFTA Awards in 2009. Bin Weevils received the "Best Website" BAFTA Award in 2011. To celebrate, new nest items were launched in-game. Bin Weevils won the BAFTA Awards again towards the end of 2012. Bin Weevils won the "Best Website" for the third time in late 2013 and again in 2014.
