= TrueTube =

TrueTube is a British free online educational platform producing documentary, drama and animation films aimed at teachers, students and young people. TrueTube was the first online channel to be nominated for channel of the year at the British Academy Children's Awards, and was the first online channel to win channel of the year.

== Background ==
TrueTube was launched in 2007 by CTVC Ltd, an independent production company and registered charity, whose aim is “to engage viewers, listeners and readers through all media with matters of religion, faith and ethics from a perspective which respects those of all faiths and those with none”. They are funded by the Rank Foundation, a charitable legacy of Pinewood Studio founder J. Arthur Rank.

== Awards ==
TrueTube films have received 20 nominations and seven wins at the BAFTA Children's Awards since becoming eligible in 2016, including the first nomination and win for an online channel in the Channel of the Year category.

Refugee

Short drama Refugee, which was directed by Adam Tyler and produced by Bob Ayres, Jonathan Green and Adam Tyler, tells the story of a British family fleeing their home after war breaks out. It is told from the point of view of Ash, a ten-year-old girl, with a reverse chronological structure. Refugee became the first online film to win in the Drama category at the 2016 BAFTA Children's Awards, and also won the Sandford St Martin Award for best Children's programme, the Broadcast Digital Award for Best Scripted Online Short and Learning On Screen's General Education Non-Broadcast Award.

Like Me

A high-concept short film about a young person's difficult experience with social media, Like Me was written and directed by Adam Tyler, and produced by Bob Ayres and Adam Tyler. The lead role was played by Isobelle Molloy, and the film won in the Drama category at the 2017 BAFTA Children's Awards.

Screwball!

Screwball! was written and directed by Adam Tyler, and produced by Bob Ayres, Adam Tyler & Kim Roden. It features Alhaji Fofana and Savannah Baker as two young people navigating issues around sex and consent. Both lead actors were nominated in the Best Performer category at the 2017 BAFTA Children's award, which was won by Alhaji Fofana, and Adam Tyler received the Writer award. The film was also awarded the Sandford St Martin Award for best Children's programme.

What Do You Mean I Can't Change The World?

Directed by Adam Tyler and produced by Bob Ayres, Adam Tyler & Kim Roden, What Do You Mean I Can't Change The World? is a documentary telling the story of young activist Jemmar Samuels, and of her experiences of colourism and hair texture discrimination. The film won the inaugural Content for Change award at the 2018 BAFTA Children's Awards. In Samuels’ acceptance speech she dedicated the award to everyone who bullied her when she was growing up.

Origins

Origins is a short film incorporating both live action and animation elements to tell three possible stories of a newborn baby's future life. It was made by Adam Tyler, Bob Ayres and Antonio Rebolo. The film was awarded the BAFTA Children's Award for Short Form in 2018.

Other TrueTube films nominated for BAFTA Children's Awards include Hijab & Me, One-to-One, Now I Can Breathe, and The Demon's Head. Church History in Ten Minutes was awarded the Digital Video prize at the 2018 Jerusalem Awards, and nominated for a Sandford St Martins award. Shia // Sunni received a Special Commendation at the 2017 Learning on Screen awards.
