= UNIT9 =

Production company

- Industry: Interactive, Advertising, Film, Branded Content
- Founded: 1997
- Headquarters: London, UK
- Area served: Global
- Key people: Founders: Piero Frescobaldi; Tom Sacchi; Yates Buckley
- Number of employees: 150+ employees
- Divisions: New York City, Los Angeles, London, Florence, Berlin
- Website: http://www.unit9.com/

UNIT9 is a multidisciplinary production company working in different interactive areas: films, games, virtual reality and digital technology. Founded in 1997, UNIT9 operates globally with offices in London, Los Angeles, New York, Florence, Berlin and Poland. Directors, writers and technologists work collaboratively to create content, advertising, utility and gaming. Ad Age Production Company A-List, UNIT9 partners with advertising agencies worldwide on the digital components of campaigns.

== Awards and recognition ==
UNIT9's work has been honoured with 1x Emmy, Cannes Lions, 17 One Show Pencils, 250+ FWA, 15 Webby Awards, including Winner of Best Use of Interactive Video in 2013, 13 Awards, including Site of the Year (Users Choice) for Slavery Footprint, Silver and Bronze Effie 2013, and a BAFTA nomination.

In April 2019, UNIT9 was named Ad Age's Production Company of the Year.

== UNIT9 Digital ==
=== Lifesaver ===
Lifesaver is a crisis simulating app created for the UK Resuscitation Council with the goal of teaching basic CPR to users through interactivity, gamification and live-action film. Lifesaver presents users with high-stress scenarios to test their speed and efficiency in administering CPR. The option to share these results on social platforms was added to the app to promote engagement among a younger audience.

=== Just a Reflektor ===
Just a Reflektor is an interactive video directed by Vincent Morisset, featuring the song "Reflektor" by Canadian rock group Arcade Fire. The music video takes advantage of dual screen interactivity, allowing users to cast virtual projections with their mobile devices as the video plays in a web browser. This innovative music video is the first of its kind, allowing the viewer to transform the film visually and instantly.

=== Slavery Footprint ===
Slavery Footprint is a website and mobile app that launched on the 149th anniversary of the announcement of the Emancipation Proclamation. The interactive questionnaire approximates the number of real-world slaves who work to create the goods that users enjoy on a daily basis. The HTML5 survey was built to increase awareness of modern-day slavery and to inform users of their slavery footprint. The project was publicly endorsed by the US President Barack Obama during his speech to the Clinton Global Initiative in 2012.

=== Find Your Way To Oz ===
Find Your Way To Oz is an interactive Google Chrome Experiment inspired by Disney's Oz the Great and Powerful. The game is set in a Kansas circus where players work through a series of challenges that eventually lead them to the mythical land of Oz. This project was developed as an interactive trailer for the film, utilizing innovative technology to create a 3D environment built entirely on WebGL and CSS3 platforms. The game’s final sequence—including a massive tornado—was created with the use of a custom GLSL shader. An animation previously developed to map the inside of the brain cell of a mouse was used as the framework to simulate the tornado’s movement. Developers implemented a custom volumetric shader to adapt the animation while maintaining acceptable processing rates, allowing players to view the tornado from all directions.

=== Attraction ===
Attraction is an interactive anime directed by Koji Morimoto and Anrick Bregman, commissioned by the French Ministry of Health and targeted and educating youth on the dangers of smoking. Users interact with the story by manipulating events with their cursor and webcam, ultimately altering the flow of the story. Attraction is based in 2040 Tokyo and focuses on the journey of three Japanese children. A live installation was developed in 2013 as an adaptation of Attraction. The updated installation was featured at the Electronic Language International Festival, where hundreds of users were able to interact with the story by shifting and moving their own body in a single space. UNIT9 applied motion sensor technology and immersive sound to allow the user to interact from a distance and become an active part of the story as it played on a large projection in front of them.

== UNIT9 Films ==
Working with world-class directors, UNIT9 Films specializes in live action and storytelling film content for TV, social web, mobile, installations and VR.

=== Barclaycard #Bespokeballads ===
Barclaycard: #Bespokeballads was a user-generated viral video project that used the hashtag “#bespokeballads” to interact directly with Twitter followers. The project took place over the course of one week, in which songwriters wrote, performed, and recorded custom-made ballads inspired by the randomly selected Twitter feeds of users tweeting with the hashtag “#bespokeballads.” The artists also wrote songs about the latest celebrity gossips and Internet trends. In total, more than 80 songs were created.

=== Bitchcraft ===
Bitchcraft is a paranormal web series starring Fay Ripley. The series follows Gemma who—after losing her boyfriend and job—returns home to live with her parents. Upon arrival, she is horrified to learn that her mother has become a practicing witch. Gemma struggles to return her life to normal as she quickly realizes that the entire neighbourhood is infused with black magic. The series has been popular with young audiences, such as fans of Misfits and Merlin.

=== Tropicana: Energie Naturelle ===
Tropicana: Energie Naturelle is a short documentary that tells the story of an installation created in Paris for Tropicana in 2011, directed by Johnny Hardstaff. The installation connected over 2,500 oranges with zinc and copper spikes to create a full-scale billboard, with the words “Energie Naturelle” powered by 1,800 volts of electricity. The film documents the building process as well as viewer’s reactions.

== UNIT9 Games ==
=== Philips: You Need to Hear This ===
Philips: You Need to Hear This was an interactive music video project in which users were able to create custom music videos for the song Carolyn, by the Swiss Lips. The videos were created based on the user’s performance in a retro-styled 8-bit racing game—their decisions in the game automatically remixed the song and generated a unique accompanying video.

=== Domino's Pizza Hero ===
Domino’s Pizza Hero Domino’s Pizza Hero is an interactive gaming app developed for Domino’s Pizza for use on tablet and mobile devices. Players are tasked with creating pizzas as quickly and efficiently as possible, with the top players receiving real-world job offers from Domino’s Pizza. The game is a unique and immersive approach to recruitment. Additionally, users were able to order pizzas directly from the app.

=== MINI Maps ===
MINI Maps is a multiplayer racing game that merges technologies from both Google Maps and Facebook. Players race against other Facebook users in a series of randomized real-world locations. The app also provides local weather data for each racing location and the option for users to custom design their own MINI.

=== Nano Panda ===
Nano Panda is a puzzle game developed for iOS and Android platforms. The gameplay is based on conceptual physics, heavily utilizing magnetic simulation. The main character—a panda shrunk down to nano size—is tasked with destroying evil atoms. The game won the W3 Gold Award in Mobile Applications in the Games category and was downloaded over a million times globally.

== Hoxton Window Project ==
Hoxton Window Project is a public art project hosted and curated by UNIT9. Artists are invited to cover the windows of UNIT9’s Hoxton Square office with different forms of art, from graphic design to illustration to interactive displays. The Hoxton Window Project has included art from Mcbess and Jon Burgerman, among others.
