= Resuscitation Council UK =

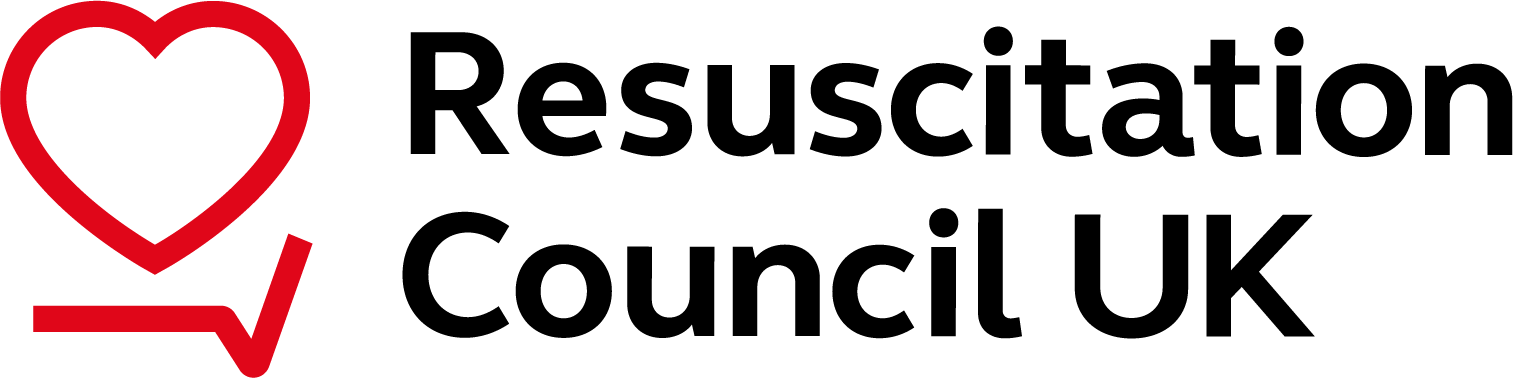
Logo of the Resuscitation Council UK

Resuscitation Council UK (RCUK) is a healthcare charity focused on resuscitation education and training for healthcare professionals and bystander CPR awareness for the public.

It is the United Kingdom body responsible for setting central standards for CPR and related disciplines. RCUK is a member of the European Resuscitation Council, which is part of the international standards body, the International Liaison Committee on Resuscitation (ILCOR).

== History ==
Resuscitation Council UK was formed in 1983 by a group of medical professionals with a shared interest in research-based resuscitation methods and instruction. Its objective is to educate both the general public and health care professionals in the most effective resuscitation methods. RCUK's resuscitation guidelines and quality standards provide guidance for healthcare professionals regarding adult, paediatric and newborn resuscitation. The organisation has an established set of professional training courses that operate across the UK and train healthcare professionals in immediate and advanced life support.

In more recent years, Resuscitation Council UK has also been involved in various campaigns to support the public in learning CPR. RCUK leads the UK's effort on Restart a Heart Day, working with St John Ambulance, NHS Ambulance Services, British Heart Foundation, British Red Cross and the Saving Lives for Scotland to raise awareness of out-of-hospital cardiac arrest and encourage people to learn CPR skills.

RCUK also works to raise awareness of the importance of CPR decision-making, and has developed the Recommended Summary Plan for Emergency Care and Treatment (ReSPECT) Process, which has been adopted in numerous regions across the UK.

== Aims ==
Resuscitation Council UK aims to:

- establish appropriate guidelines for resuscitation
- encourage members of the public to respond quickly to an emergency and learn CPR skills
- encourage research into methods of resuscitation
- promote the teaching of resuscitation as established in the guidelines
- establish and maintain standards for resuscitation
- develop community partnerships and tackle health inequality in the UK
