= Maddie Moate =

British television presenter, YouTube filmmaker and Special blogger

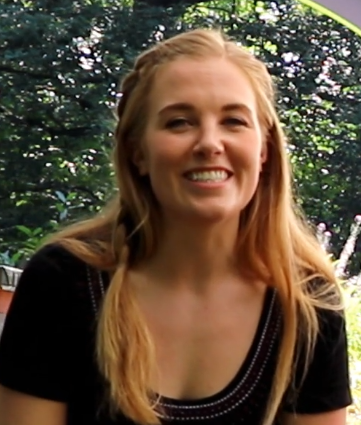
- Maddie Moate circa January 2019
- Born: 26 July 1988 (age 38)
- Education: Bristol University
- Occupations: Television presenter; podcaster; YouTuber; filmmaker; children's author
- Years active: 2011–present
- Known for: Do You Know? (TV series)
- Website: www.maddiemoate.com

Madeleine Moate (born 26 July 1988) is a British television presenter, podcaster, YouTuber and children's author best known for presenting the CBeebies series Maddie's Do You Know? for which she was awarded the Best Presenter BAFTA at the Children's BAFTAs 2017. Moate is a science communicator; she studied theatre, film and television at Bristol University. .

== Early life ==
Moate grew up in Witney, Oxfordshire, attending Henry Box School and the Jill Stew School of Dance and Dramascope. She went on to study drama at the University of Bristol.

== YouTube and online content ==
Moate developed and presented The App Show, an online comedy series on LadyGeek, with Nicola Hume from 2011 to 2012. The series, which attracted over 850,000 views, discussed everyday tech issues from a female perspective and was sponsored by Nokia.

In 2012, she presented Newsburst on O2 Guru TV. The series attracted more than four million views. The same year, Moate presented Home of the Future for Channel 4. Between 2012 and 2013, Moate made three films for Samsung. The Samsung SSD Angels videos attracted 1.5 million views. Moate presented a series of films for Intel and Argos, for use in their Superhuman Academy and Smarten Up campaigns. Moate presented the online videos for Sony Xperia Z5 in September 2015, whilst in Berlin.

Since 2014, Moate has been the lead presenter of BBC Earth Unplugged, a BBC produced channel on YouTube with over 480,000 subscribers. The series garnered the notice of BBC America, who compiled the highlights to make a one-off television programme, It's a Mad Mad Maddie World!.

In March 2015, she released a video The Real Me (Perioral Dermatitis) talking about her personal struggles with perioral dermatitis in the hope that "talking openly about it could actually be a big support to lots of other people". In September 2015, she released a follow-up video titled: Maddie Moate – Hydromol Ointment 3 in 1 Regime, explaining that she had been misdiagnosed and that she actually has (or had had) under-treated eczema.

At the beginning of the COVID-19 pandemic, Maddie Moate teamed up with her then-partner Greg Foot to create 'Let's go Live', a YouTube livestream with different themes each week. Each one is science based and includes suggestions for hands-on activities that could be done during the lockdown period. Themes included; Dino week, Brilliant bodies and Theme parks.

Also in 2020, Maddie became a presenter on Fully Charged, a YouTube channel exploring battery-electric vehicles and renewable energy.

In 2020 she also started a new podcast Maddie's Sound Explorers that won the Best Family Podcast in the British Podcast Awards 2021.

During 2022, Maddie hosted a YouTube Original Maddie's Urban Jungles as well Make Yourself At Home international series for Magnolia which can viewed on Discovery+, part of Warner Brothers. Discovery Inc.

== Media ==
Moate has been the resident technology expert on BBC Radio 5 Live Saturday Edition since 2014. She frequently features on BBC Radio 5 Live's Big Share, Good Morning Britain and BBC Breakfast. Since September 2016, Moate presents a factual series for CBeebies, entitled Maddie's Do You Know?, which has an average audience of 328,000. A second series was commissioned by CBeebies, produced by Sarah Trigg, and shown in 2018.

She won the BAFTA Children's Awards in 2017, in the category of presenter. A third and fourth series have since been released in 2019 and 2020 respectively. In 2018, she joined the BBC team on Springwatch, hosting the "Springwatch Wild Academy" aimed at schools and children. In June 2022 she appeared as guest presenter on an episode of The Gadget Show while Georgie Barrat was on maternity leave.

Starting in 2025, Moate was added as a presenter on CBeebies' sign-language series Something Special.

== Writing ==
In September 2021 she released a book called ‘Stuff' with illustrations by Paul Boston. As with her YouTube and Television work, it is a book aimed at inspiring children, covering a range of topics all about 'stuff'. In October 2023, Moate wrote 'A Very Curious Christmas', subtitled "Festive fun and seasonal science from around the world", the book is a collection of stories, facts, crafts and activities based on Christmas and winter traditions.

== Stage ==
From 11 December 2021 to 3 January 2022, Moate appeared in De Montfort Hall's production of Sleeping Beauty.

From 2 December 2022 to 2 January 2023, she performed as Tinkerbell at York Theatre Royal's performance of Peter Pan.

From 8 to 31 December 2023, she performed as Tinkerbell at the Alban Arena in St Albans in The All New Adventures of Peter Pan – A Pantomime Sequel.

In December 2024, Moate wrote, and starred in "A Very Curious Christmas", a Christmas-themed live science show at the Apollo Theatre.
