= Gigglebiz =

British children's television programme

- Title card (in Series 1). L to R: Captain Adorable, Nana Knickerbocker, Major Boogie.
- Also known as: GiggleQuiz
- Genre: Sketch comedy
- Created by: Justin Fletcher
- Directed by: Jack Jameson, Geoff Coward, Damian Farrell, Helen Sheppard, Tom Poole, Anna Mears, Michael Towner
- Starring: Justin Fletcher; Rod Arthur; Wayne Forester; Richard Sutton; Simon Ludders; Becky E. Shrimpton; Simon Grover; Tom Golding; Penny Ryder; Ellie Kirk; Darren Hart; Steven Kynman; Peter Singh; Anita Dobson; Pui Fan Lee; Alexandra Mardell; Bella Tweenies; Howard Goodall
- Composers: Barrie Bignold; Liz Kitchen
- Country of origin: United Kingdom
- Original language: English
- No. of seasons: 5
- No. of episodes: 114 (excluding the showreel, pilots and GiggleQuiz)

Production
- Executive producers: Alison Stewart, Tony Reed, Vanessa Amberleigh
- Production location: Dock10 studios (2011–present)
- Editor: Gerry Skinner
- Camera setup: Chris Yacoubian; Mark Gosling; Mike Maddams
- Running time: 13 minutes (including 15-second intro)
- Production company: British Broadcasting Corporation (BBC)

Original release
- Network: CBeebies
- Release: 7 September 2009 – 15 March 2021

Gigglebiz is a British children's comedy television programme (described as a 'live-action comedy sketch show' by the BBC) consisting of five series that have been broadcast on CBeebies, the BBC's younger children's channel, starting in 2009.

The TV series was created by Justin Fletcher, who plays the lead character in all of the comedy sketches and also wrote a few sketches in its first series. Some of the sketches are filmed in the studio, while other sketches are filmed outside; for example, one is filmed at Portmeirion, used for the fictional town of Wiggyville where Captain Adorable's sketches are set from Series 1 to 2. The show is interspersed with a selection of children called the Gigglekids, who tell jokes to Justin himself, in their own section called 'Giggle Box'.

In many episodes, there is also ‘Silly Time’, where Justin says "It's Silly Time!", then some of the other characters dance to music. In one scene during this, four characters are shown dancing at once. Silly Time is not in every episode.

== History ==
Gigglebiz's production began in the mid-1990s, when Justin Fletcher produced a showreel named Justin Time, to showcase his acting abilities to television companies. In November 2008, CBeebies aired three TV pilots featuring Fletcher, called Humphrey the Painter, Gigglebox, and Captain Adorable: The Locked Door Adventure, with the objective being that one of them would become a full series. Following the broadcast of the pilots, CBeebies announced on November 25 that Gigglebox would become the full series, and would air within the channel's 2009 schedule. On May 5, 2009, the show's final title was announced as Gigglebiz, and that it would begin airing within the summer of that year.

The first series was broadcast in September 2009, comprising 25 13-minute episodes and 20 characters each. The first episode premiered on 7 September 2009. A Christmas special was broadcast on 15 December 2010. The second series comprised 15 episodes being broadcast in January 2011 and saw several characters disappear to make way for five new ones, replacing them. The spinoff quiz show GiggleQuiz came after Gigglebiz, premiering on 28 October 2019 and later in December 2020.

== Characters ==
=== Main characters ===
- Ann Teak (Gigglebiz Series 1-4, & GiggleQuiz Series 1-2) An elderly bossy antiques expert who thinks that she knows everything about antiques. In reality, she always ends up displaying little or no knowledge. She normally manages to break delicate objects, most often not realising her accidents, much to her customers' distress. Ann also as a habit of forgetting her customers' surnames, and using humorous substitutes for them. Despite not having a role in series 5 of Gigglebiz, she later returned as a contestant in both series of GiggleQuiz.
- Arthur Sleep ("Justin Time" Showreel, Gigglebiz Series 1-5 & GiggleQuiz Series 1-2) A newsreader of a Northern origin who doesn't take his job very seriously and is especially prone to make up silly jokes out of various news stories. Hence his name, he also sometimes falls asleep during the news. Additionally, Arthur is the host of GiggleQuiz, which he puts more focus into than the news. He is the most frequent character in Gigglebiz, having appeared in almost every episode since the first series. Additionally, he appeared in the Justin Time showreel.
- Captain Adorable (Captain Adorable: The Locked Door Adventure, Gigglebiz Series 1-5 & GiggleQuiz Series 1-2) An egotistical superhero who is depicted as less than super. Despite his kindly nature to everyone, Adorable always fails to show any superpowers and help anyone how he intends too. He originally appeared in his own standalone pilot before being added to Gigglebiz itself. In series 3, he moved from living in the fictional town, Wiggyville, into a spaceship and often causes chaos during his crew’s flights. In series 4, he is always found alongside his trainee superheroine, Awesome Girl, giving her advice on how to become better at saving the world, though it is often Awesome Girl who has to lead Adorable to the solutions. In series 5, he is accompanied by his auntie who regularly records him whilst on daily errands helping others as part of Captain Adorable’s new show called the "Super Vlog".
- Dan Step (Gigglebiz Series 3-5 & GiggleQuiz clips) A tap dancer who often gets into a mix up with the props used in his dances. This is usually because his partner, Tony Tap, is more flexible, or simply given the better prop out of them both. He doesn't speak. Dan also made one brief guest appearance in the GiggleQuiz episode The Lost Pirate’s Treasure.
- Dina Lady (Gigglebiz Series 1-2, 4-5 & GiggleQuiz Series 1-2) A homely cook who takes the names of dishes to their very literal meanings and is always found alongside her assistant Tommy Tummy when not competing on GiggleQuiz. In Series 4, Dina became the host of a Great British Bake Off-esque show called Bake Me A Star with Tommy as her co-host. Running gags are how she always tastes the dishes of her contestants before Tommy can, and always awards herself the star rosette for her own dishes. In Series 5, Dina became the delivery driver for a catering company. She delivers cakes to customers, though her antics mean that they are never delivered carefully enough.
- DIY Dan (Gigglebox Pilot, Gigglebiz Series 1, 3-5 & GiggleQuiz clips) A clumsy DIY enthusiast who always causes chaos in his workshop, often breaking his possessions. He is described as "TV's worst DIY expert" and his work is grist to his DIY mill. He doesn't speak and his segments instead feature a male narrator, who is also voiced by Justin Fletcher. The narrator ends the sketches with the catchphrase of "Job done!" In the Gigglebox pilot, however, Dan did speak and was instead named Andy Guy.
- Enrico Paso Doble (Gigglebiz Series 3-5 & GiggleQuiz clips) A ballroom dancer who isn't very good at dancing and regularly gets distracted during his routines. He always has an unnamed female dance partner who varies by series. Enrico doesn't speak, however, he did once verbally apologise during Captain Adorable in Space, and does sing "Arrivederci!" in the credits of series 4 and 5.
- Gail Force (Gigglebox Pilot, Gigglebiz Series 1-5 & GiggleQuiz Series 1-2) A weather reporter who has a knack of predicting unusual styles of weather that happens directly to her. She additionally works as a reporter and has an unfortunate tendency of causing bother to people or items she is reporting on. Gail is also one of the team captains in GiggleQuiz. In Series 5, Gail begins her new chat show, "Gail", and similar to reporting, often causes bother to her guests who sit directly opposite her.
- Humphrey (Humphrey The Painter, Gigglebiz Series 1, 3-5 & GiggleQuiz clips) A silent man who is irrepressible and inquisitive about the world around him, which usually leads to getting himself in awkward situations for the public around him. His trusty companion and best friend is Woody the dog. Beginning in Series 3, Humphrey also stumbles across his neighbour wherever he goes, causing his neighbour chaos too. Similar to Captain Adorable, he originally appeared in his own standalone pilot where he was a painter before being added to Gigglebiz. Fletcher has stated in a 2013 interview that this character was inspired by Rowan Atkinson’s portrayal of Mr. Bean. But in the outtakes, Humphrey spoke.
- Keith Fitt (Gigglebiz Series 2-5 & GiggleQuiz Series 1-2) A Geordie sports instructor who always claims to have had a "20-year" experience in exercising, though this has not gained him any valuable skills and he continually fumbles when demonstrating various sport and other fitness. Keith is also one of the team captains in GiggleQuiz. In series 4 and 5, he was the star of a show called Keith Fitt: It's a Record, Man!, where he would attempt to set new timed world records around two male judges, though never succeeding.
- Lost Pirate (Gigglebiz Series 1-2, 4-5 & GiggleQuiz Series 1-2) A jolly and persistent pirate who is always on the lookout for his lost treasure but has a habit of taking the most normal situations in life too seriously, which can often get him in trouble. He regularly mistakes an 'X' symbol to mean "X marks the spot" for buried treasure. In series 1 and 2 the Lost Pirate has a parrot called Captain Squawk and in series 4 and 5 he has one called Captain Crackers. His parrots always sit on his shoulder.
- Nana Knickerbocker (Gigglebiz Series 1, 3-5 & GiggleQuiz Series 1-2) A pantomime dame who describes herself as "everyone's favourite". Nana lives her life as if she were on stage and lacks much common sense in the actual world due to this. This can often lead her to trouble with the public who are going about their daily business with several pantomime routines. Nana additionally hosts her own round on GiggleQuiz called Nana's Panto Showdown. In series 4 and 5, Nana opens her own panto shop on a local farm, where her animals often escape to her shop and cause the customers trouble.
- Professor Muddles (Gigglebiz Series 1-5 & GiggleQuiz Series 1-2) An eccentric scientist who often gets his words mixed up and whose experiments never go to plan. He also does lots of inventions which are intended to make life easier for him but can often backfire. In Series 5, he received emails from several people, all of whom have joke names, asking questions related to science and during the sketch would attempt unsuccessfully to explain the answer.
- Rapids Johnson (Gigglebox Pilot, Gigglebiz Series 1-5 & GiggleQuiz Series 1) A wildlife explorer who consistently fails to hunt down and capture the sight of elusive wildlife (usually bears or giant pandas) on his searches, despite them being in plain sight for the viewers. In the Gigglebox pilot, he was called Jungle Jimbo and was Australian, rather than British. Aside from Gigglebiz, Rapids also appeared in the Justin's House episode, Teddy Bears' Picnic. On GiggleQuiz, Rapids only appeared as a contestant in series 1, though was never seen in series 2.
- Wild Wez (Gigglebiz Series 5 & GiggleQuiz clips) A friendly cowboy who is always trying to clean up his barn, but his barnyard animals always manage to mess it up again. He doesn't speak.
- Will Singalot (Gigglebiz Series 3-5 & GiggleQuiz clips) A minstrel and one of Robin Hood’s Merry Men who infuriates Robin Hood with his nonstop singing and always spoils Robin's efforts to impress Maid Marian, however, he did apologise without singing in DIY Dan's Spice Rack. He is quite unique amongst the other Merry Men, in that his main colour is red rather than green.
- Wizard Tripwick (Gigglebiz Series 5 & GiggleQuiz Series 1-2) A wizard teacher who has unusually long, grey hair and who isn't very good at magic. He normally manages to perform his spells directly on his pupils or himself instead of other intended objects around his classroom.

=== Former characters ===
- Anna Conda ("Justin Time" Showreel, Gigglebiz Series 1) A reptile expert who loves to make jokes based on reptiles, and who responds to letters sent in by children, all of whom have joke names. Similar to Arthur Sleep, she also appeared in the Justin Time Showreel.
- Burrito Brothers (Gigglebox Pilot, Gigglebiz Series 1-4 & GiggleQuiz clips) A trio of strongmen who perform in front of a live audience. The older two brothers are played by Karl Magee and Gary Cross. The youngest brother, played by Justin, always unintentionally ruins their acts in some way. They don't speak, although they do make vocal sounds and frequently say "Hey!" all together. In the Gigglebox promo, the youngest Burrito Brother said, "Watch some Gigglebox, on CBee-Bee-Bee-bies!"
- Chip Monk (Gigglebox Pilot & Gigglebiz Series 1) An eccentric pet shop worker who tries his best not to have to sell the animals in his shop to his customers, because he has since gotten to know them very well. With his last appearance in Chip Monk The Hamster, he was the earliest Gigglebiz character to be dropped from the show.
- Doctor Doctor (Gigglebiz Series 2) An unprofessional doctor who likes telling "doctor doctor" styles of jokes to his patients. He has the shortest sketches of all characters in Gigglebiz.
- Farmer Dung (Gigglebiz Series 1-3) A jolly farmer who loves to use wordplay, and who has an assistant called Reggie. His segments always feature a female narrator.
- King Flannel (Gigglebox Pilot, Series 1-3, GiggleQuiz clips) A naughty, childish, old monarch who needs to be kept in line by his long suffering butler for his naughty ways. Between series 1 and 2, he only spoke by mumbling to himself and in gibberish sounds, though by series 3, his dialogue became notably clearer more understandable.
- Major Boogie (Gigglebiz Series 1, Christmas special & 2) A tired, old tin soldier who secretly likes to dance when two children aren't around in their bedroom. Other toys on the shelf also join in. Whilst dancing, he doesn’t speak, but he does when opening and ending his sketches.
- Milkshake Jake (Gigglebiz Series 1) An American sundae bar worker who always becomes too enthusiastic by the professions of his customers, leading to the point of spoiling their important outfits with various condiments.
- Opera Oliver (Gigglebiz Series 2) An Italian opera singing waiter who likes to sing about food so much that he tends to forget the condition of his hungry customers who usually end up leaving in annoyance. He also sang "Arrivederci!" in the series 2 credits.
- Packed Lunch Pete (Gigglebiz Series 1) A wandering man who constantly fails to eat his packed lunch outdoors in various embarrassing ways. He doesn't speak.
- Postie (Gigglebiz Series 1) A postman who always tries but fails to deliver the post on time. He doesn't speak, although in the episode Postie Goes to School, he did cheer and laugh. Having appeared in just three episodes, Postie is the least frequent character in the entire series.
- Rod and Annette (Gigglebiz Series 2) A fisher couple. Rod, played by Justin, loves to catch fish but always gets himself in trouble whilst doing so and his wife, Annette, played by Anita Dobson, loves to chat to other people, never noticing Rod's trouble. Rod, unlike his wife, doesn't speak.
- Simon Pieman (Gigglebiz Christmas Special, Series 2) A pie deliveryman whose deliveries are done on roller skates and whose pies always end up directly in his face.
- Storybook Stan (Gigglebiz Series 3-4) A storyteller with a wig whose attempts to tell a story always end in disaster for various reasons. He often loses his wig during his segments.
- Sue Keeper (Gigglebiz Series 3) A zookeeper who always gets her animal facts mixed up. She has to therefore get corrected by several members of the group of people on the tours, whom Sue refers to as "wildlife lovers".
- Ug and Ig (Gigglebiz Series 3) A caveman duo. Ug, played by Justin, always tries to invent something and often fumbles with it due to his weakness, and Ig, played by Freddie Butterfield, has to therefore end up helping him. Their inventions in doing so are never used as how they were originally intended to be. Ug only speaks in stereotypical caveman like sounds while Ig doesn't speak. Ig is a child.
- Will Barrow (Series 3-4 & GiggleQuiz clips) A gardener whose gardening experience is always ruined by the animals destroying the plants and food in his garden. He doesn't speak.

=== Additional characters ===
- Awesome Girl (Kae Alexander) (Gigglebiz Series 4, GiggleQuiz clips) Captain Adorable's trusty super heroine companion who is trained by Adorable himself. Adorable has a habit of repeating back to her anything she says to him first.
- Botham (Christopher Driscoll) (Captain Adorable: The Locked Door Adventure, Gigglebiz Series 1, 3 & GiggleQuiz clips) Captain Adorable's butler who does most of the work for Adorable. Adorable always rudely calls him "Bottom". Botham has a catchphrase which is "It's Botham, Captain" or "It's Botham, Sir", because he hates being called "Bottom". This character did not return for series 4, likely due to Driscoll's passing earlier in 2015.
- Dobbin (Gigglebiz Series 1, 4 & GiggleQuiz Series 1-2) Nana Knickerbocker's rather cheeky pantomime horse who always interferes with her farm and during the games in Nana’s Panto Showdown.
- Doreen (Gigglebiz Series 1-5 & GiggleQuiz Series 1-2) Arthur Sleep's coworker who fails to understand any of Arthur's news jokes. Arthur is then always slightly offended due to this. Her arm only appears, and although viewers don't hear her, Arthur does speak directly to and reply to her. In Gail Plays The Spoons, Arthur made a painting of her, intending to show viewers what she looks like, but happened to make the picture only of her arm with a thumbs up, revealing nothing further than what is already known.
- Humphrey's Neighbour (Michael Webber) (Gigglebiz Series 3-5 & GiggleQuiz clips) A long suffering man who Humphrey, whilst oblivious, always gets into trouble whenever they meet together.
- Keith Fitt's Judges (Nicholas Khan and Peter Singh) (Gigglebiz Series 4-5 & GiggleQuiz clips) The judges who give Keith Fitt instructions and set the world records Keith always fails to beat. One judge is notably stricter to Keith and is responsible for timing his record attempts on a stopwatch.
- King Flannel's Butler (Simon Grover) (GiggleBox Pilot, Gigglebiz Series 1-3, GiggleQuiz clips) King Flannel's long suffering butler who tries to keep him in line, though not always successfully.
- Lady Chatalot (Julie Alanah Brighten) (Gigglebiz Series 1-3, GiggleQuiz) King Flannel's friend, who annoys Flannel with her frequent talking. Flannel also becomes jealous of her because Chatalot seems to get more attention than Flannel does.
- Maid Marian (Ellie Kirk) (Gigglebiz Series 3-5) An irritable maiden who Robin Hood has lived all his life to marry, yet who sees Robin in the very opposite way. The only Will Singalot sketch she did not appear in was during DIY Dan's Spice Rack.
- Merry Men (Michael Webber, Rod Arthur, Peter Singh (2013), Nick Kellington (2015-2018), Shola Adewusi (2018), Susannah Van Den Berg (2018)) (Gigglebiz Series 3-5 & GiggleQuiz clips) Will Singalot's friends who also enjoy nonstop singing, much to Robin Hood's annoyance, depicted very similar to Will. One of them (Rod Arthur) is named Little John. Together, them and Will are always responsible for impressing Marian, who usually ends up leaving Robin.
- QT (Bethan Lindsay (2008); Chloe Dallo (2009); Tilly Ducker (2013-2015)) (Captain Adorable: The Locked Door Adventure, Gigglebiz Series 1, 3-4 & GiggleQuiz clips) Captain Adorable’s youngest sidekick and is an 11-year-old girl. She is also the pilot of Captain Adorable's spaceship in series 3.
- Reggie (Darren Hart) (Gigglebiz Series 1-3) Farmer Dung's assistant. He doesn't speak, but normally hysterically laughs along with Dung over their jokes.
- Robin Hood (Tom Golding) (Gigglebiz Series 3-5 & GiggleQuiz clips) Will Singalot's best friend who suffers from Will's constant singing and ends the sketches with his catchphrase of "That minstrel's got to go", though this was not the case at the end of Wizard Tripwick's Mending Spell.
- Tommy Tummy (Richard Sutton) (Gigglebiz Series 1-2, 4-5 & GiggleQuiz clips) Dina Lady's assistant who knows more about cooking than Dina herself. He tries his best but fails to stop her from cooking the incorrect way she has planned and points out how it should be done at home to viewers. He has two main catchphrase which are "Hello, Tommy!" once Dina asks him to introduce himself to the viewers, and "Don’t try this at home," when he realises Dina is cooking in her incorrect manner.
- Tony Tap (Chris Whittaker) (Gigglebiz Series 3-5 & GiggleQuiz clips) Dan Step's dance partner who often has to help Dan out whenever he is performing. Tony also often pushes Dan off the stage if the latter becomes too much trouble to handle. Tony, along with Dan, doesn't speak.
- Wildlife Animals (Gigglebox Pilot, Gigglebiz Series 1-3 & GiggleQuiz Series 1) These animals consist most often of Giant Pandas and Brown Bears. They are the frequent subjects of Rapids Johnson's searches who consistently fails to spot them, however near to Rapids they may be. The animals are played by people in various costumes, except the Madagascan monkey, which was a backpack belonging to Rapids.
- Woody the Dog (Humphrey The Painter, Gigglebiz Series 1, 3 & GiggleQuiz clips) Humphrey's brown dog. Similar to his owner, he has been known to cause chaos of his own. His name is revealed the moment Humphrey calls out for him halfway through the sketch in Rapids Johnson's Panda Book, and also during the series 3 outtakes on CBeebies’ official YouTube channel.

== Series overview ==
Series	Season	Episodes	Originally released (UK)	
Series	Season	Episodes	First released	Last released
Gigglebiz	1	25	7 September 2009	2 October 2009
Gigglebiz	1	25	2 November 2009	6 November 2009
Gigglebiz	2	15	17 January 2011	4 February 2011
Gigglebiz	3	26	21 October 2013	8 November 2013
Gigglebiz	3	26	2 December 2013	16 December 2013
Gigglebiz	4	25	5 January 2015	23 January 2015
Gigglebiz	4	25	16 February 2015	27 February 2015
Gigglebiz	5	22	28 October 2018	9 November 2018
Gigglebiz	5	22	18 February 2019	4 March 2019
Gigglebiz	Christmas Special		15 December 2010	
GiggleQuiz	1	15	28 October 2019	15 November 2019
GiggleQuiz	2	12	16 December 2020	
GiggleQuiz	2	12	1 March 2021	15 March 2021

== Episodes ==
There are 114 episodes of Gigglebiz across 5 series. Initially, only in series 5 and in GiggleQuiz did the episodes have proper titles, whilst in series 1-4, they were just referred to by the series and episode numbers (e.g., Series 4, episode 11), and the Christmas special was just referred to as "A Gigglebiz Christmas".

=== Series 1 ===
Series 1 premiered in 2009 and had 26 episodes total, including the Christmas Special in 2010.

=== Series 2 ===
Series 2 premiered in 2011 and had 15 episodes total.

=== Series 3 ===
Series 3 premiered in 2013 and had 26 episodes total.

=== Series 4 ===
Series 4 premiered in 2015 and had 25 episodes total.

=== Series 5 ===
Series 5 premiered in 2018 and had 22 episodes total.

No. in series	Title	Original release date
1	"Enrico's Duck Dance"	TBA
2	"Wizard Tripwick's Banana Spell"	TBA
3	"Professor Muddles' Rainy Day"	TBA
4	"Dina Lady's Chocolate Cake"	TBA
5	"DIY Dan's Cat Flap"	TBA
6	"Captain Adorable's Shopping"	TBA
7	"Wizard Tripwick's Disappearing Spell"	TBA
8	"Keith Fitt's Dancing Record"	TBA
9	"Robin Hood's Giant Pumpkin"	TBA
10	"DIY Dan's Dripping Tap"	TBA
11	"Rapids Johnson's Rain Dance"	TBA
12	"Wild Wez's Thirsty Cactus"	TBA
13	"Dan Step's Balloon Dance"	TBA
14	"Gail Plays the Spoons"	TBA
15	"Humphrey's Camping Trip"	TBA
16	"Dina Lady's Banana Cake"	TBA
17	"Gail Goes to Space"	TBA
18	"Robin Hood's New Horse"	TBA
19	"The Lost Pirate's Bus Trip"	TBA
20	"DIY Dan's Gnome Garden"	TBA
21	"Wizard Tripwick's Mending Spell"	TBA
22	"Gail Sings Country and Western"	TBA

== DVDs ==
- Captain Adorable and Friends (S1 E1-9)
- Where Are You, Rapids Johnson? (S1 E10-12 and 14-19)
- A Gigglebiz Christmas (S1 E13 and 20-25, Christmas Special and S2 E1)
- Dancing with Major Boogie (S2 E2-4 and 10-15)
- Sporty Time with Keith Fitt (S2 E5-9 and S3 E1, 3, 7, 10 and 11)
- Laugh Along with Farmer Dung (S3 E2 and 12-20)
- He's Behind You, Nana Knickerbocker! (S3 E4-6, 8, 9 and 21-25)

=== 3 disc and 4 disc DVD sets ===
- The Bumper Collection (3 disc set, DVDs 1-3)
- The Gigglebiz-Tastic Bumper Collection (4 disc set, DVDs 4-7)

== Spinoff (GiggleQuiz) ==
On 3 July 2018, a spinoff mock quiz show, entitled GiggleQuiz, was announced, being made with Justin Fletcher reprising his main character role. It first aired on 28 October 2019. Unlike Gigglebiz, it is, as said, a mock quiz show.

The aim of the game was to answer questions about clips and pictures, shown from the previous series (Series 3–5). It is hosted by Arthur Sleep, and the team captains are Gail Force and Keith Fitt. Nana Knickerbocker hosts her own round named "Nana's Panto Showdown". Rapids Johnson, (in Season 1 only) Wizard Tripwick, Dina Lady, Captain Adorable, Ann Teak, The Lost Pirate, and Professor Muddles appear as the possible contestants. The other characters make cameos. GiggleQuiz began its second season on 16 December 2020, starting with the episode "A Giggle Quizmas". It later re-aired in March 2021 to air the episode "Wizard Tripwick's Crystal Ball".

=== GiggleQuiz episodes ===
==== Series 1 ====
No. in series	Title	Original release date
1	"Dina Lady's Brussels Sprout Cake"	TBA
2	"Captain Adorable's Sidekick"	TBA
3	"The Lost Pirate's Treasure"	TBA
4	"Keith Fitt's Quiz Fit"	TBA
5	"Super Banana Gail"	TBA
6	"Keith Fitt's Juggling"	TBA
7	"Rapids Johnson's Quizzly Bear"	TBA
8	"Ann Teak's Painting"	TBA
9	"Arthur's Tie Break"	TBA
10	"Professor Muddles' Brain Buster"	TBA
11	"Gail Force's Thinking Cap"	TBA
12	"Ann Teak's Antique Wand"	TBA
13	"Rapids Johnson's Helping Bear"	TBA
14	"Professor Muddles' Handy Invention"	TBA
1	"Gail Wants to Sing"	TBA

==== Series 2 ====
No. in series	Title	Original release date
1	"A Giggle Quizmas"	TBA
2	"Wizard Tripwick's Crystal Ball"	TBA
3	"Dina Lady's Ice Cream Machine"	TBA
4	"Professor Muddles' Mystery Machine"	TBA
5	"Keith Fitt's Broken Buzzer"	TBA
6	"Arthur Sleep's Leaky Pipes"	TBA
7	"Dina Lady's Cakey Mix Up"	TBA
8	"Keith Fitt's Pesky Fly"	TBA
9	"The Lost Pirate's Empty Chest"	TBA
10	"The Muddles-Keith Muddle-Up"	TBA
11	"Keith Fitt's Rumbly Tummy"	TBA
12	"Wizard Tripwick's New Wand"	TBA
