= Justin Fletcher =

British actor and presenter (born 1970)

Justin Fletcher MBE
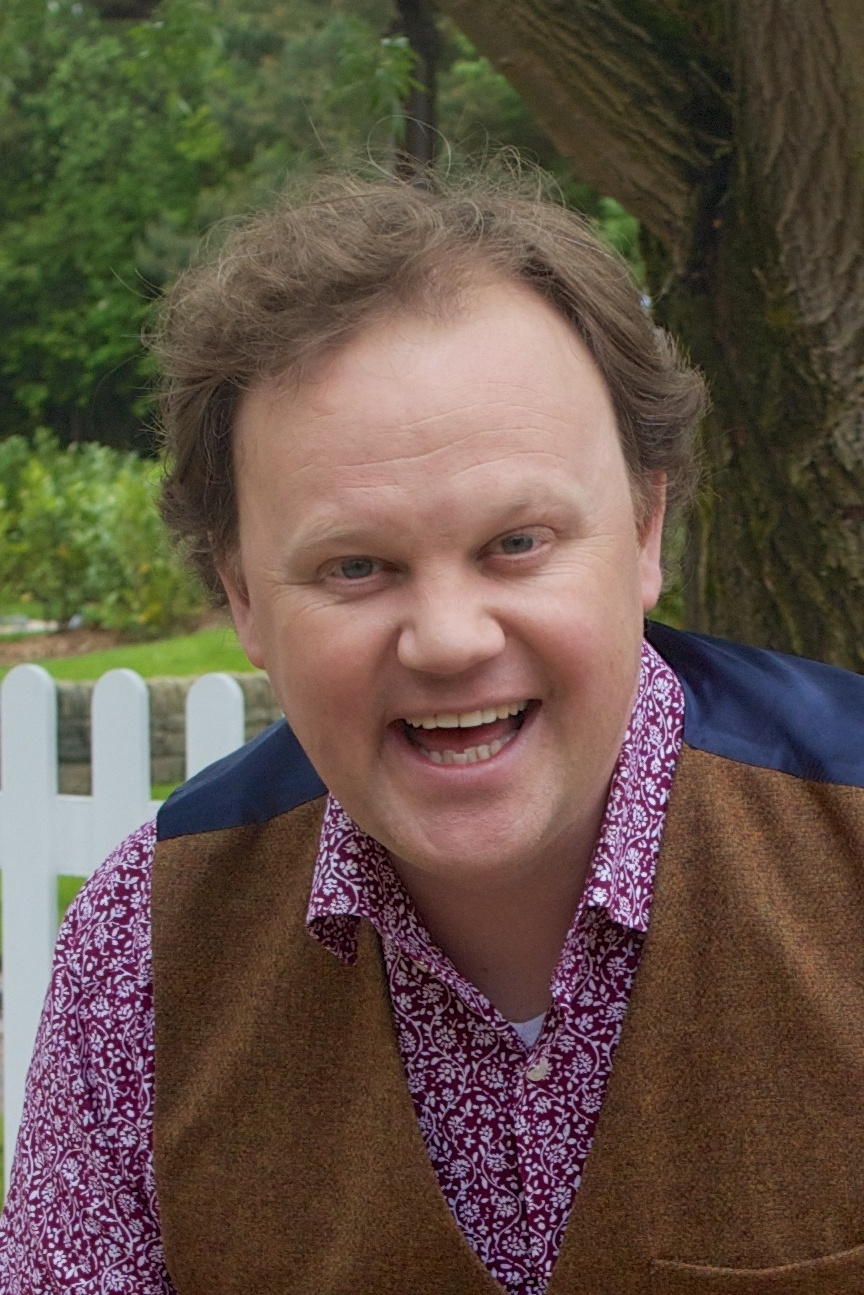
- Fletcher at CBeebies Land in 2014
- Born: 15 June 1970 (age 56); Henley-on-Thames, Oxfordshire, England
- Education: Guildford School of Acting
- Occupations: Children's television presenter, actor, comedian, singer
- Notable work: Fun Song Factory; Tweenies; Tikkabilla; Boo! Something Special; Shaun the Sheep; Timmy Time; Gigglebiz; Justin's House; GiggleQuiz
- Father: Mervyn Guy Fletcher

Justin Fletcher (born 15 June 1970) is an English children's television presenter, actor, comedian and singer, known for mainly appearing on CBeebies. Speaking and performing in various, often self-created, roles, he specialises in slapstick comedy and works with children with special educational needs through his show Something Special.

== Career ==
While in his final year studying drama at the Guildford School of Acting, Fletcher started to regularly watch Phillip Schofield working as a continuity announcer and was inspired to pursue a career in children's television. Following a suggestion from Schofield, Fletcher sketched out various comedic characters and put together a showreel called Justin Time which encompassed two different characters: Anna Conda, a short-sighted reptile-house warden; and Arthur Sleep, a regional newsreader who has difficulty staying awake and can sleep anywhere no matter what. Both characters were used for his CBeebies show Gigglebiz. His first television show after graduation was Fun Song Factory for GMTV, working with Dave Benson Phillips (he had earlier appeared in the stage production of Playdays after its television cancellation, portraying the character Mr. Jolly).

=== BBC and CBeebies ===
In 1999, Fletcher first began working with the BBC as he voiced the characters of Jake and Doodles in Tweenies, up until the final episode of the series in 2002. He was one of the presenters of the programme Tikkabilla, out of which was spun Higgledy House, a slapstick comedy for children with Sarah-Jane Honeywell, which progressed to the very popular Mr. Tumble. Fletcher has also voiced the characters, Sleeping Bear and Growling Tiger in CBeebies' Boo!, Miguel in Finley the Fire Engine, and additional voices in ToddWorld, Shaun the Sheep, and Timmy Time.

Fletcher developed Something Special through his own production company, and he presents it while signing in Makaton.

In November 2008, CBeebies aired three different pilots made by Fletcher, with the possibility of one of them becoming a full-time series. They were called Humphrey the Painter, Gigglebiz, and Captain Adorable. In January 2009, an announcement by CBeebies was made that Gigglebiz would become the regular show, starting in September 2009, with the Humphrey and Captain Adorable characters being included, which was now a series of character-based comedy sketches linked by jokes told by children.

Fletcher is a relief continuity presenter for CBeebies' presentation links and regularly performed on the CBeebies radio station on BBC Radio 7 until its change to BBC Radio 4 Extra in 2011.

Fletcher also appears as himself, along with a range of animated characters, in the Bee Bright series of educational DVDs.

Fletcher also occasionally appears in a show called The Hollies School.

==== Justin's House ====
In October 2011, CBeebies began broadcasting Justin's House, starring Fletcher with Steven Kynman as "Robert the Robot" and Jane Deane as "Dee Livery". The show is based in Justin's fictional house and recorded live in front of a studio audience.

=== Other work ===
Fletcher voiced Harold the Helicopter in a Thomas & Friends live show.

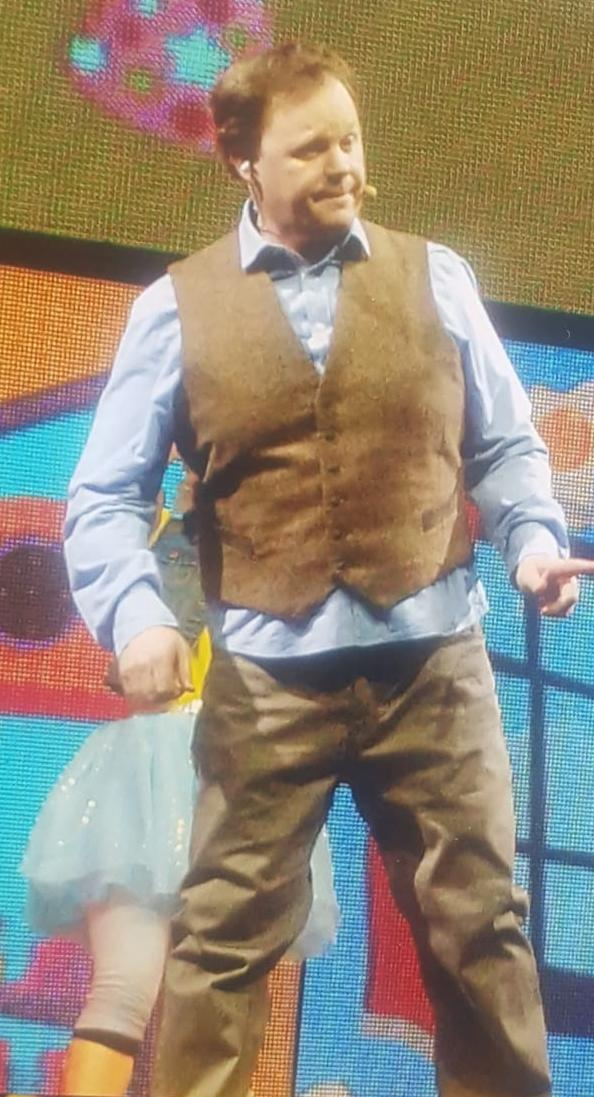
Fletcher performing in 2012

Starting in 1998, Fletcher presented Fun Song Factory for GMTV for a year as his first full-time presenting role. He later returned to the show in 2004 as the voice of Ozzy.

Also in 1998, Fletcher sang several songs as well as the theme tune to the children's stop motion animated series Tom and Vicky.

He owns a production company called Scrumptious House, which has released a DVD called Let's Sing Nursery Rhymes with Justin Fletcher.

In the CITV channel programme Jim Jam and Sunny, he is the voice of both Jim Jam and Slim the cowardly giraffe.

His voice appears on the VTech Turn and Learn Driver, the Bob the Builder phones, and a number of Crick Software titles.

From December 2009 to January 2010, Fletcher played the character Buttons in Cinderella at the Capitol Theatre in Horsham, West Sussex. From December 2010 to January 2011, he played the character Josh the Jester in the pantomime Sleeping Beauty at the Hexagon theatre in Reading, Berkshire. From December 2011 to January 2012, he played the character Wishy Washy in the pantomime Aladdin at the Hexagon theatre. Fletcher has since performed in numerous pantomimes at the venue, including Cinderella, Sleeping Beauty, Beauty and the Beast and Peter Pan, as well as the 2022 pantomime Jack and the Beanstalk. He also attends festivals, such as Camp Bestival in Dorset, to entertain children. Fletcher is a patron for Bournemouth-based performing arts school Stagewise.

His debut album Hands Up the Album reached number 16 in the UK Albums Chart on 11 March 2012. In March 2013, he released his second album Best Friends. In January 2015, he released his third album Just Party.

In 2015, 2019 and 2026, Fletcher reprised his Shaun the Sheep roles of Shaun and Timmy in the three film adaptations based on the series: Shaun the Sheep Movie, A Shaun the Sheep Movie: Farmageddon and Shaun the Sheep: The Beast of Mossy Bottom. He also played the roles in two television films: Shaun the Sheep: The Farmer's Llamas (2015) and Shaun the Sheep: The Flight Before Christmas (2021).

On 12 September 2015, he appeared on Pointless Celebrities, where he was eliminated in the second round.

Fletcher presented a daily radio show on Fun Kids weekdays from 9 am to 10 am called Justin's Word.

== Personal life ==
Fletcher was born on 15 June 1970 in Henley-on-Thames, Oxfordshire. He is the son of songwriter Guy Fletcher. He has three sisters and one brother.

His cousin, also named Guy Fletcher, is a musician.

He is currently in a relationship with his on-screen co star Samantha Dorrance who he appeared with on CBeebies in The Tale of Mr Tumble in 2015. The two have also worked together on different projects since including Justin Time to Rock.

== Awards ==
=== Orders of chivalry ===
Fletcher was appointed Member of the Order of the British Empire (MBE) in the 2008 Birthday Honours for services to "children's broadcasting and the voluntary sector".

=== Professional awards ===
- BAFTA Children's Awards 2007

- Nominated as Best Presenter for Something Special

- BAFTA Children's Awards 2008

- Awarded Best Presenter for Something Special

- BAFTA Childrens Awards 2009

- Awarded Best Presenter for Something Special

- BAFTA Children's Awards 2010

- Awarded Best Presenter for Something Special
- Nominated Best Performer for Gigglebiz

- BAFTA Children's Awards 2011

- Nominated Best Presenter for Something Special

- BAFTA Children's Awards 2012

- Awarded the Flynn Rossiter award for entertainment

- BAFTA Children's Awards 2018

== Filmography ==
Years	Programme/project	Role
1998–2004	Fun Song Factory	Himself (Presenter), Ozzy (voice only, 2004 version)
1999–2002	Tweenies	Jake, Doodles (voices only)
1999	Legoland (video game)	Jonathan Ablebody, Professor Ignatius Voltage (voices only)
2000	Frogger 2: Swampy's Revenge	Swampy (voice only)
2000	Chicken Run (video game)	Rocky, Fetcher (voices only)
2002–2005	Tikkabilla	Himself (presenter)
2002	Higgledy House	Himself
2002–2009	Make Way for Noddy	Whiz (UK dub)
2003–2006	Boo!	Growling Tiger, Sleeping Bear (voices only)
2003–2025	Something Special	Himself, Mr Tumble, various characters
2006–2007	CBeebies continuity links	Himself (presenter)
2006	ToddWorld	Pickle (UK dub), additional voices
2006	CBeebies Springwatch	Himself (presenter)
2006	Jim Jam and Sunny	Jim Jam, Slim the Cowardly Giraffe (voices only)
2007–2010	CBeebies on BBC Radio 7	Himself (presenter)
2007–present	Shaun the Sheep	Shaun, Timmy, Pidsley (seasons 1-2) (voices only)
2007	Finley the Fire Engine	Miguel, other characters (UK dub, voices only)
2008	Famous 5: On the Case	Timmy, Smidgie (voices only)
2008	Green Balloon Club	Himself (original workprints & launch pilot)
2009–2021	Gigglebiz	Various characters
2009–2012	Timmy Time	Timmy, Yabba the Duck, Paxton the Pig, Kid the Goat, Finlay the Fox (voices only)
2010	Jollywobbles	Mr Jolly
2011	Olly the Little White Van	Olly (voice only)
2011–2017, 2021-2023	Justin's House	Himself
2015	Shaun the Sheep Movie	Shaun, Timmy (voices only)
2015	Shaun the Sheep: The Farmer's Llamas	Shaun, Timmy (voices only)
2019	A Shaun the Sheep Movie: Farmageddon	Shaun, Timmy (voices only)
2019	GiggleQuiz	Various characters
2021	Shaun the Sheep: The Flight Before Christmas	Shaun, Timmy (voices only)
2024	Twelfth Night!	Antonio
2026	Shaun the Sheep: The Beast of Mossy Bottom	Shaun, Timmy (voices only)

== Live performances ==
- Playdays

- 1997, as Mr. Jolly (live stage show only)

- Camp Bestival

- 2009
- 2010
- 2011
- 2012
- 2015
- 2023

- Justin's Party Tour

- 2017, playing 27 theatres over 31 days

- Butlins

- 2017
- 2019–2025
