= Legoland (video game) =

2000 video game

- Developer: Krisalis Software
- Publisher: Lego Media
- Platform: Microsoft Windows
- Release: NA: 1 May 2000
- Genre: Construction and management simulation
- Mode: Single-player

Legoland is a Legoland-themed construction and management simulation video game released for Microsoft Windows on 1 May 2000. It shares many aspects with the RollerCoaster Tycoon series (a similar series of games with an identical premise) but with a more simplistic and child-friendly gameplay style. The voicework is provided by Justin Fletcher.

== Gameplay ==
A screenshot of in-game action

=== Story Mode ===
In Story Mode, the player begins by completing five tutorial levels to learn the gameplay mechanics, followed by ten Miniland levels to rebuild the Park. Upon completing the game, the player receives a printable certificate as a reward. Story Mode also includes cutscenes depicting Professor Voltage traveling back in time, discovering new buildings, rides, and park themes, and using his Duplicator Ray to collect hologram-like copies of them.

=== Free Play Mode ===
In Free Play Mode, the player can create their own Legoland park without any objectives or limitations on money or time, but can only use sets they have unlocked up to that point and with a limit on the number of rides, decorations, and restaurants that can be placed. Completing the game in Story Mode gives the player access to all unlockables in Free Play Mode.

== Development ==
Legoland was developed by a small team of six people, with three artists and three programmers. The game was initially planned to receive a PlayStation version, alongside PC, but the PlayStation port was canceled, as the system was not powerful enough to handle the graphics.

Minigames were considered for the game; however, only two were ever designed. One was a Wild West game like Frogger, and the other was a jungle game similar to River Raid. Both were cut because there wasn't enough time to finish them.

The minifigures in the game were rendered in real time, while the backgrounds and buildings were pre-rendered. The developers initially planned to use pre-rendered characters as well, but this caused animation issues on rides that moved upside down.

== Reception ==
Legoland received favorable reviews, earning a score of 80.5% at rating site GameRankings, based on two reviews.
