= Olly the Little White Van =

British animated series by Henry Becket

- Genre: Children's television series
- Created by: Henry Becket
- Starring: Justin Fletcher; Holly-Marie Michael; Andy Nyman; Phil Gallagher (series 1-5)
- Country of origin: United Kingdom
- No. of seasons: 6
- No. of episodes: 78

Production
- Executive producer: Henry Becket
- Running time: 5 minutes / 11 minutes
- Production companies: Ideas at Work; Blink Animation Studios; Jamba Entertainment; Fandango Productions

Original release
- Network: CITV; Channel 5 Cartoonito
- Release: February 6, 2011 – January 14, 2013

Olly the Little White Van is a British children's CGI television series from the United Kingdom, created by Henry Becket. Original episodes have aired on CITV, Channel 5 and Cartoonito.

The series has 5-minute long episodes and 11-minute long episodes, and is syndicated in multiple countries, including Turkey, Russia, Sweden, The Netherlands, Japan, South Korea and the UAE.

== Synopsis ==
Featuring the adventures of a little white van called Olly and his driver Stan. He doesn't always get it right, but he always tries his best.

== Characters ==
- Olly
- Bazza
- Ivan
- Jethro
- Royston
- Bessie
- Suzy
- Quentin
- Bertie
- Stan
- Alice
- Mick
- Dylan
- Mohammed
- Farmer Dan
- Mario
- Miss Florette
- Percy
- Professor Claxon
- Max
- Tasha
- Ruby
- Sir Ronald Grump
- Milford
- Charlie
- DJ Dawn
- Tommy
- Sandy
- Dirk
- Ronnie
- Donnie
- Two unnamed racing cars (recolors of Tasha and Dirk)
- Unnamed forklift

== Episodes ==
=== Season 1 ===
1. Roadside Cafe (26 June 2011)
2. Bird Watching (27 June 2011)
3. My Favourite Flavour (28 June 2011)
4. Shady Lane (29 June 2011)
5. Best in Show (30 June 2011)
6. Olly Cleans Up (1 July 2011)
7. Driving School (2 July 2011)
8. Bumpton Rally (3 July 2011)
9. Duck and Cover (4 July 2011)
10. Zookeeper Olly (5 July 2011)
11. The Grand Unveiling (6 July 2011)
12. Catch Me if You Can (7 July 2011)
13. Zoo Hill (8 July 2011)

=== Season 2 ===
1. A Giant Leap For Vankind (15 December 2011)
2. Ruby's Rescue (16 December 2011)
3. Olly the Chauffeur (17 December 2011)
4. Dancing on Ice (18 December 2011)
5. Turbo Bertie (19 December 2011)
6. Nothing to Worry About (20 December 2011)
7. The Wonderful Washer (21 December 2011)
8. Ivan and Mario: The Musical (22 December 2011)
9. The Bumpton Cup (23 December 2011)
10. Back to School (24 December 2011)
11. Radio Olly (25 December 2011)
12. Bumpton in Bloom (26 December 2011)
13. Olly the Artist (27 December 2011)

=== Season 3 ===
1. Olly's Treasure Hunt (31 May 2012)
2. Tractor Trouble (1 June 2012)
3. Crazy Golf (2 June 2012)
4. Olly the Little Red Firevan (3 June 2012)
5. Olly the Magician (4 June 2012)
6. High Revs (5 June 2012)
7. Get Up and Dance (6 June 2012)
8. The Bumpton Incident (7 June 2012)
9. Olly Vanquish (8 June 2012)
10. To Catch a Thief (9 June 2012)
11. Olly the Detective (10 June 2012)
12. Olly the Little Stinker (11 June 2012)
13. The Road to Recovery (12 June 2012)

=== Season 4 ===
1. Laundryman And The Wheeled Wonder (21 August 2012)
2. What's In The Box (22 August 2012)
3. Ivan Has The Hiccups (23 August 2012)
4. A Very Olly Christmas (25 December 2012, Christmas Special)
5. Olly The Inventor (25 August 2012)
6. Handle with Care (26 August 2012)
7. Bumpton Day Big Band (27 August 2012)
8. Bertie's New Glasses (28 August 2012)
9. Valentine's Day (14 February 2013, Valentine's Day Special)
10. Betsy the Bumper Car (29 August 2012)
11. Meals on Wheels (31 August 2012)
12. The Driving Test (1 September 2012)
13. Rock N Roll (2 September 2012)

=== Season 5 ===
1. Suzy's Makeover (28 October 2012)
2. Skyscraper Caper! (29 October 2012)
3. Bumpton Buses (30 October 2012)
4. The Mystery of the Bumpton Ghost (31 October 2012, Halloween Special)
5. Olly the Cat (20 December 2012)
6. The Audition (21 December 2012)
7. Bad Luck Olly (22 December 2012)
8. Train Trouble (23 December 2012)
9. Just the Ticket! (24 December 2012)
10. Hired and Fired (25 December 2012)
11. Bridge Builder Olly (26 December 2012)
12. Olly at Sea (27 December 2012)
13. Birthday Bazza (28 December 2012)

=== Season 6 ===
1. Olly's Room (2018)
2. Strictly Bumpton (2018)
3. Who's Olly? (2018)
4. The Olly Stuff (2018)
5. A Hard Day's Knight (2018)
6. Bumpton's Strongest Van (2018)
7. Close Encounters of the Olly Kind (2018)
8. Big Business (2018)
9. Bumpton's Bestest Bakers (2018)
10. Where's Olly? (2018)
11. Christmas Lights Switch On (2018, Christmas Special)
12. Farmer Of The Year (2018)
13. The Monster of Bumpton Loch (2018)
