= Timmy Time =

British stop-motion preschool television programme

- Also known as: It's Timmy Time
- Genre: Preschool
- Created by: Jackie Cockle
- Based on: Shaun the Sheep by Nick Park and Bob Baker
- Voices of: Justin Fletcher; Kate Harbour; Louis Jones; Andy Nyman
- Opening theme: "It's Timmy"
- Ending theme: "It's Timmy" (second verse)
- Composer: Mike Stobbie
- Country of origin: United Kingdom
- Original languages: English (theme song only); None (non-speaking language in all episodes)
- No. of series: 3
- No. of episodes: 80 (original series, including two specials); 78 (It's Timmy Time) (list of episodes)

Production
- Executive producers: Miles Bullough; David Sproxton; Peter Lord; Nick Park
- Producer: Jackie Cockle
- Production location: Filmed in Bristol
- Running time: 10 minutes 22 minutes (specials); 5 minutes (It's Timmy Time)
- Production company: Aardman Animations

Original release
- Network: CBeebies
- Release: 6 April 2009 – 13 July 2012

Related
- Wallace & Gromit; Shaun the Sheep

Timmy Time is a British stop motion preschool animated series created and produced by Bob the Builder producer Jackie Cockle for the BBC's CBeebies and produced by Aardman Animations. It started broadcasting in the United Kingdom on 6 April 2009. It is a spin-off of Shaun the Sheep, itself a spin-off of the Wallace & Gromit film A Close Shave (1995).

The first two series ran for 26 episodes. In the United Kingdom, its most recent run began in September 2011 on CBeebies. In Australia, series one started in May 2009 on ABC1 and series three in May 2011 on ABC 4 Kids. The series also aired in the United States on Playhouse Disney, later called Disney Junior, beginning on 13 September 2010, but later ended its run on 16 May 2014.

== Premise and format ==
In the series, Timmy and his friends have to learn to share, make friends and accept their mistakes. They are supervised by two teachers, Harriet the Heron and Osbourne the Owl. The show is aimed at pre-school-aged children, which the company described as "a natural next step for Aardman".

The show is made up of ten-minute episodes, which do not feature much dialogue, much like Shaun the Sheep, Wallace & Gromit and A Close Shave. Shaun, his friends, Bitzer and the Farmer are absent. A filming of one episode was featured on the Discovery Channel's How It's Made.

During the show's development, the series was simply called Timmy. CBeebies acquired UK-broadcast rights to the series in October 2007.

In 2018, Aardman collaborated with the British Council to create "Learning Time with Timmy", a show to encourage children aged 2–6 around the world to learn the English language, along with a YouTube-exclusive series and three apps.

In October 2019, Aardman announced a new version of the existing 78 episodes for CBeebies titled It's Timmy Time (also known as Timmy Time 2.0) that began broadcast later on in the month. These versions feature narration from a selection of pre-school children, and are five-minutes in length when compared to the original 10-minute episodes.

== Episodes ==
Series	Episodes	Originally released	
Series	Episodes	First released	Last released
1	26	6 April 2009	13 July 2009
2	26	17 May 2010	21 June 2010
3	28	14 March 2011	13 July 2012

== Characters ==
=== Children ===
- Timmy (vocal effects by Justin Fletcher) is a lamb and the titular character who enjoys being in the spotlight. He is 3 years old in sheep years and later turns 4 in the episode "Timmy's Birthday". In many of the episodes, he gets into trouble; however, he learns from his mistakes and often tries to help the other characters out when he can. He is best friends with Yabba and is very close to Finlay. Timmy's noise is 'baa'.
- Yabba (vocal effects by Justin Fletcher) is a duckling who wears blue goggles and Timmy’s best friend. Like Timmy, he can be rambunctious and get into trouble. Yabba's noise is 'quack'.
- Paxton (vocal effects by Justin Fletcher) is a piglet who is characterised by his appetite for apples and his weight. He wears a blue sweater and is never seen without it. Paxton's noise is 'oink'.
- Mittens (vocal effects by Kate Harbour) is an orange kitten who is like other kittens: she doesn't like getting wet or dirty and is rather sensitive. In some episodes, she seems to have feelings for Timmy. She always loves playing with picnics. Mittens' noise is 'meow'.
- Ruffy (vocal effects by Louis Jones) is a brown puppy who is energetic but can sometimes be mentally slow and he is a good friend too. Ruffy's noise is 'ruff'.
- Apricot (vocal effects by Kate Harbour) is a hedgehog hoglet who is very quiet and skittish. When startled or frightened by someone or something she rolls up into a ball. Apricot's noise is 'hicoo', although she rarely speaks.
- Stripey (vocal effects by Louis Jones) is a badger cub who is a bit sleepy and slow as badgers are nocturnal. Stripey's noise is 'honk'.
- Kid (vocal effects by Justin Fletcher) is a blue goat kid who has a large appetite like Paxton and chews anything in sight. If the thing he is chewing is taken from him, he does not mind and moves on to something else. Kid's noise is 'meep meep'.
- Otus (vocal effects by Kate Harbour) is a purple owlet and Osbourne's son who enjoys helping. He can be typically found reading and is very sensitive, sometimes copying his father. Otus' noise is 'too-wit, too-hoo'.
- Finlay (vocal effects by Justin Fletcher) is a red fox kit who is excitable and full of energy. Finlay's noise is 'yip-yap'.

=== Teachers ===
- Harriet (vocal effects by Kate Harbour) is a heron who speaks through caws and clicks. She is one of the two nursery managers. Harriet's noise is "Bawk-baw".
- Osbourne (vocal effects by Louis Jones) is a purple owl who is the other manager of the nursery and Otus' father. Osbourne's noise is "Hoot-hoo".

=== Side characters ===
- Bumpy (vocal effects by Justin Fletcher and Kate Harbour) is a green caterpillar who is not a part of the class but has many background appearances in the show. Bumpy's noise is blee blub.
- Timmy's Mother (vocal effects by Kate Harbour) is a sheep who is also not a part of the class, but does appear in the opening sequence, "Timmy's Christmas Surprise" and the end credits. She also appears in Shaun the Sheep. Timmy's mother's noise is baa.
- Ted (vocal effects by Louis Jones) is a Teddy Bear who is not a part of the class but he can visit a snack time Ted is Timmy's Pets. Ted's noise is squeaking.

== Reboot ==
On 21 June 2026, a second Timmy series was announced Let’s Go Timmy will use 2D animation.
