= List of Timmy Time episodes =

Timmy Time is a British stop-motion animated children's comedy series made for the BBC by Aardman Studios. The series premiered on 6 April 2009 and ended on 13 July 2012, with a total of 80 episodes over the course of 3 seasons. The eponymous Timmy is a little lamb, who is attending kindergarten.

== Series overview ==
Series	Episodes	Originally released	
Series	Episodes	First released	Last released
1	26	6 April 2009	13 July 2009
2	26	17 May 2010	21 June 2010
3	28	14 March 2011	13 July 2012

== Episodes ==
=== Series 1 (2009) ===
No. overall	No. in series	Title	Original release date
1	1	"Timmy's Jigsaw"	6 April 2009
When making a jigsaw, Timmy loses a piece, Paxton is playing with his wind up train but it's not working by itself.
2	2	"Timmy's Hiccup Cure"	7 April 2009
Kid has the hiccups and Timmy tries to help cure him.
3	3	"Timmy Wants to Win"	8 April 2009
The class is having a sports day. Even though Timmy tries his best, he does not win a single race, but learns he can win by being helpful.
4	4	"Timmy the Artist"	9 April 2009
Timmy and Mittens paint portraits of each other while Yabba, Stripey and Otus are painting portraits outside.
5	5	"Timmy Can't Dance"	10 April 2009
The class explore dance styles like hula, hip hop and line dancing, but Timmy only wants to dance to hip hop.
6	6	"Timmy Says Sorry"	13 April 2009
While playing outside, Timmy causes a lot of havoc during the day and accidentally kicks a football through the nursery window. Harriet and Osbourne give him a time out and has to stay there until the window is repaired. He then makes a happy ending by jumping on a sandcastle with Otus.
7	7	"Timmy Steals the Show"	14 April 2009
Timmy's class is having a talent show. Yabba is bossing everyone around, but then he loses his voice. Timmy steps in to help.
8	8	"Timmy Wants the Beret"	15 April 2009
Timmy wants Ruffy's beret, Mittens's carriage and Otus's puppet, so he steals them. Timmy learns not to steal when Ruffy steals his teddy bear.
9	9	"Timmy Wants the Blues"	16 April 2009
Timmy's favourite colour is blue. So he decides to have a day when he wants everything to be blue, for example, blue toys, a blue cup and a blue cushion. But when it comes to painting, other colours suit a picture more than just blue.
10	10	"Timmy Plays Ball"	17 April 2009
Timmy hogs the class ball. He keeps kicking it around and stealing it of Otus. Timmy teaches Otus to kick when nobody else wants to play football with him.
11	11	"Timmy's Picnic"	20 April 2009
On a class picnic, the students play football until Apricot's spikes pop the ball. Apricot feels guilty, until she realizes that her prickly coat can pick up rubbish.
12	12	"Timmy Tries to Hide"	21 April 2009
Everyone in the class play hide and seek, but nobody wants to hide with Paxton, because he is too noisy.
13	13	"Timmy on Wheels"	22 April 2009
Timmy rides the tricycle, but Ruffy has trouble learning to use it and Timmy did not know how to ride Mittens's scooter so Finlay teaches him to ride.
14	14	"Snapshot Timmy"	23 April 2009
It is time for the class photo, but Timmy finds it hard to keep from getting dirty, especially since the camera is not working right.
15	15	"Timmy Goes Bang"	24 April 2009
After hearing thunder during a storm, Timmy becomes fixated by loud noises and scares Apricot away. To help her feel better, the group performs a drum concert.
16	16	"Timmy Afloat"	27 April 2009
The class is making boats, but Timmy has been paired with a very sneezy Stripey who accidentally destroys Otus's boat. Otus is unhappy with this, until Timmy gives Otus his own boat.
17	17	"Timmy Gets the Job Done"	28 April 2009
It is time to clean the nursery but Timmy would rather play outside instead. However, Timmy learns that playing around when tidying up is not good when he makes a mess and gets a time-out.
18	18	"Timmy Needs a Bath"	29 April 2009
After a muddy game of football, Timmy tries to avoid having to take a bath and when at art, Apricot's paw, Kid's hoof and muzzle and Yabba's wing get dirty as well.
19	19	"Timmy Wants the Drum"	30 April 2009
During a music lesson, Timmy decides he wants to play the drum, but Yabba gets it instead. Jealous, he tries to steal the drum, only to break it by mistake. In the end, it gets fixed with tape, and Timmy and Yabba play the drum together.
20	20	"Go Kart Timmy"	1 May 2009
After an encounter with a compost heap, Timmy learns the importance of waiting his turn.
21	21	"Timmy the Train"	6 July 2009
Timmy and his classmates are playing trains, however both he and Mittens want to be the leader. They both fight to win over their pals, but soon realize that it's no good being the best if there is nobody left to play with.
22	22	"Timmy's Puppet"	7 July 2009
While on his way to nursery, Timmy's home-made sock puppet falls out of his backpack. Timmy can't find it and decides to make a new puppet.
23	23	"Timmy the Builder"	8 July 2009
The class build tents for themselves, but Timmy has trouble building one. Otus agrees to help but Timmy doubts he will need any help. After a lot of tent building failures, Timmy agrees to get help.
24	24	"Timmy Brings a Smile"	9 July 2009
Timmy brings a smile when Apricot's blanket is accidentally ruined by the other animals treating it as a rag. Yabba uses it to clean his toy duck, Ruffy uses it as a cape when he plays superheroes with his toy dog, and Mittens uses it as a small blanket for a toy cat in her pram. Timmy helps Apricot retrieve the blanket in time to go home.
25	25	"Timmy's Mask"	10 July 2009
Timmy makes a dragon mask, puts it on and roars like a dragon. But it gets in the way, when playing and eating.
26	26	"Timmy's Spring Surprise"	13 July 2009
Harriet hands out seeds to Timmy and his friends and teaches them how to grow plants. Everyone else grows healthy green plants except for Timmy, who only has a little shoot in his plant pot that will not grow no matter what he does. As Kid tries to eat Timmy's produce, it pops out of the ground. It turns out to be a carrot!

=== Series 2 (2010) ===
No. overall	No. in series	Title	Original release date
27	1	"Timmy Learns Magic"	17 May 2010
Timmy is thrilled when he sees Osbourne practicing a conjuring act. Convinced he can do magic too, Timmy tries to impress his friends, but none of the tricks seem to work.
28	2	"Sticky Timmy"	18 May 2010
Harriet shows Timmy and his friends how to make a collage. But Timmy gets glue all over himself and soon the various items that the classmates have collected are stuck all over his fleece then Yabba has realized that he had lost his lucky prize feather. Note: This is the second time Timmy gets glue in his fleece, other times were "Stick with Me", which is a Shaun the Sheep episode.
29	3	"Timmy Gets Spooked"	19 May 2010
It's Halloween and Timmy and his friends are having lots of spooky fun, hollowing out pumpkins and making party decorations. Finlay has also made a scary mask.
30	4	"Sweet Dreams Timmy"	20 May 2010
It's nap time, but Timmy is too excited to sleep. While the other little animals snooze Timmy wants to play, and so he spends the rest of the day trying not to drop off.
31	5	"Timmy Learns to Fly"	21 May 2010
When he sees Otus flutter up to get a kite down from a tree, Timmy is very impressed. Determined to fly himself, he gets Otus to show him how it's done.
32	6	"Timmy Finds Treasure"	24 May 2010
Timmy and his friends are having great fun playing Pirates. Timmy is the Captain and leads his friends on a treasure hunt.
33	7	"Timmy's Truck"	25 May 2010
Timmy is determined to play with Otus's new remote-controlled truck. He tries more and more ambitious stunts, until disaster strikes and the truck gets broken.
34	8	"Timmy the Postman"	26 May 2010
It's Valentine's Day and Harriet is showing the class how to make cards for their best friends and Timmy volunteers to be the postman.
35	9	"Timmy Rings the Bell"	27 May 2010
Mittens proudly shows off the shiny new bell on her collar, but is inconsolable when it goes missing. The hunt is on to find the missing bell.
36	10	"Timmy's Tractor"	28 May 2010
The class is making things out of scrap and Timmy is very proud of his splendid tractor.
37	11	"Timmy's New Friend"	31 May 2010
When Yabba will not play with Timmy, he decides to make a new playmate out of clay.
38	12	"Timmy's Birthday"	1 June 2010
It's Timmy's birthday and his friends make him a delicious cake. But as the party games begin, Timmy cannot resist sneaking away to taste a bit of the tempting cake.
39	13	"Timmy's Plane"	2 June 2010
The class are making items out of folded paper, and Timmy is amazed by Finlay's fantastic paper plane.
40	14	"Tidy Timmy"	3 June 2010
Timmy's attempts at tidying his toys are rather slapdash, so Harriet shows him how it should be done.
41	15	"Timmy Bounces Back"	4 June 2010
Timmy helps out Stripey when they are playing ball games.
42	16	"Timmy's Tins"	7 June 2010
Osbourne is recycling the rubbish; Timmy wants to turn old tin cans into toys.
43	17	"Timmy the Robot"	8 June 2010
Finlay and Timmy make a robot costume for Timmy from cardboard boxes.
44	18	"Timmy's Treasure Trail"	9 June 2010
Harriet and Osbourne lay a treasure trail for the class, but Kid eats the clues.
45	19	"Timmy Goes Camping"	10 June 2010
The class are taken to a neighbouring field, where a splendid tent has been put up. But Timmy would rather have his own tent.
46	20	"Timmy's Pet Problem"	11 June 2010
Timmy adopts an old mop head as his pet, but then it starts to move on its own.
47	21	"Count on Timmy"	14 June 2010
The friends pretend to run a shop, but Timmy and Finlay do not have enough money to buy a toy and set up rival shops, until they realise it is better working together.
48	22	"Timmy Makes a Splash"	15 June 2010
The friends have a dip in the paddling pool on a hot day.
49	23	"Timmy's Snowball"	16 June 2010
Timmy and his friends are having snowball fights, then Timmy decides he wants to keep his perfect snowball.
50	24	"Timmy's Snowman"	17 June 2010
Timmy makes a Snowman.
51	25	"Timmy Slips Up"	18 June 2010
Timmy and his friends are ice skating, but Kid is worried when he keeps falling down.
52	26	"Timmy's Monster"	21 June 2010
Timmy and his friends set off around the playground to hunt for a mysterious creature.

=== Series 3 (2011–2012) ===
No. overall	No. in series	Title	Original release date
53	1	"Timmy Makes Music"	14 March 2011
Harriet and Osbourne come up with a plan for Timmy to give a very unusual performance.
54	2	"Beep Beep Timmy"	15 March 2011
Osbourne replaces Timmy's broken trike hooter with an even bigger, louder one which shocked his friends which made the teachers angry and had a discussion with the bell and the trike hooter.
55	3	"Doctor Timmy"	16 March 2011
Timmy gets to play Doctor but he won't take his costume off and insists on treating his class mates as patients. At the end, all people got messed up with paint by Stripey and Timmy fixed the problem.
56	4	"Timmy's Cookie"	17 March 2011
Harriet shows the class how to make cookies and Timmy decides to make one that is shaped like a soccer ball than all the others. Kid tries to eat the cookie every time.
57	5	"Timmy's Big Search"	18 March 2011
Timmy's glove puppet goes missing and he creates chaos as he hunts for it.
58	6	"Baby Time Timmy"	21 March 2011
Mittens is playing babies, and then wants Timmy to be the baby in her makeshift pram. At first reluctant, Timmy soon finds out that being a baby can be fun especially when everyone spoils you rotten! But when he finds out that babies don't play football, his enthusiasm starts to wane.
59	7	"Timmy Finds Aliens"	22 March 2011
Timmy is fascinated by the Moonscape collage that he and his friends make – especially the little green aliens that live on the moon. Finlay notices this, and with Harriet and Osbourne's help, he gets his friends to trick Timmy into thinking that aliens have landed at the Nursery! Note: This episode is similar to "The Visitor", "Shaun Encounters" and "Caught Short Alien" in Shaun the Sheep.
60	8	"Ballerina Timmy"	23 March 2011
Timmy is enthralled by Mittens's new music box which has a splendid ballerina on top. But he and Yabba manage to break her precious toy, and despite their best efforts to replace it, Mittens is inconsolable, until Yabba persuades Timmy to play the ballerina himself.
61	9	"Boing Boing Timmy"	24 March 2011
Timmy thinks Otus' Jack-in-the-box is brilliant, and he decides to make his own. But it's not as simple as it looks, and after several failed attempts Timmy gets an idea of how he can make the best Jack-in-the-box of all.
62	10	"Timmy in Tune"	25 March 2011
It's Music Time, and Timmy is fascinated playing the xylophone. When playtime comes, he insists on taking it with him, but drops it and one of the chimes is lost. He tries some crazy alternatives with no luck, until he hears a strange chiming noise coming from Paxton on the see-saw.
63	11	"Timmy Makes It Shine"	4 April 2011
Osbourne shows Timmy how to clean his tricycle, but it doesn't stay clean for long. He then makes other tricycles clean.
64	12	"Fireman Timmy"	5 April 2011
Timmy and Yabba cause trouble (e.g. Cause Mittens's bear to be painted green, wetting Osbourne) when they pretend to be firemen.
65	13	"Timmy and the Balloon"	6 April 2011
Timmy accidentally lets Yabba's balloon go flying off into the sky, so he tries to find a replacement. He then found an idea getting Bumpy to chew the string of the balloon.
66	14	"Timmy and the Super Rabbit"	7 April 2011
Osbourne shows the class a new super rabbit toy, and Timmy is thrilled to be the first to play with it, but his friends also want to include it in their less than super heroic games, so Timmy has to try to find a way to keep everyone happy.
67	15	"Squeaky Timmy"	8 April 2011
Timmy and Ruffy are so tickled when they discover the fun you can have with squeaks that they accidentally spoil Otus's big moment in a musical lesson. They feel very bad and make it up to Otus by devising a totally new squeaky musical performance for him to provide the finale to.
68	16	"Timmy's Egg Heads"	19 September 2011
A treasure hunt with painted eggs! But Timmy's is nowhere to be seen. Harriet helps Timmy to search but even she cannot find where she hid his egg, so she encourages Timmy to forget about that game. Finally Timmy reluctantly joins in a different game and, lo and behold, he finds his egg.
69	17	"Timmy on Safari"	20 September 2011
Timmy dreams of being an explorer who tracks and photographs wild animals. He sets out to search around the nursery with his camera. He is so disappointed when there aren't any exciting animals to be snapped, that his friends decide to give him a treat: they dress up as wild animals so Timmy gets the shots he was after.
70	18	"Timmy Shapes Up"	21 September 2011
Timmy and Kid are triangle lovers. Nothing else will do. Art, food, cushions – everything must be three sided. Until, that is, they attempt to build a tower of blocks and race a toy car with triangular wheels. But no matter! For Timmy, triangles are so over. Now only circles will do.
71	19	"Timmy and the Dragon"	22 September 2011
The class make a Chinese dragon and Timmy wants to be the head. But it's Finlay that gets that honour, much to Timmy's disappointment. Until that is Timmy realises that there's another part of the dragon which is as special and essential and just as much fun – the tail.
72	20	"Timmy's Bouncy Friend"	23 September 2011
Timmy's new friend is big, round, friendly and very, very bouncy. It's a space hopper. Timmy tries to involve his new pal in his nursery day but it is very awkward and keeps causing accidents. It's only when Harriet confiscates the space hopper that Timmy works out what it's really for: loads of bouncy fun!
73	21	"Timmy's Twin"	26 September 2011
Stripey plays at dressing up and ends up looking just like Timmy, with a white woolly waistcoat on and floppy black socks on its ears. Timmy is delighted to have a twin, Stripey is too. Timmy makes Stripey a lamb's tail to wiggle and a twin teddy to complete the look. But although he looks like Timmy, Stripey isn't much good at being a Timmy twin: he can't make the right sound, his tail wiggling leaves a lot to be desired and he’s terrible at football. During a game of football, Timmy gets impatient when Stripey keeps missing the ball so he passes it to his other friends instead of to Stripey. Stripey feels left out and trundles off sadly. Timmy realises his friend is upset and has an idea: he dresses up as Stripey much to the badger's delight and makes Stripey's noises with a horn.
74	22	"Timmy the Hero"	27 September 2011
Timmy's imagination is sparked when he reads a superhero comic. Meet Super Timmy! Timmy is desperate to save the day but his efforts aren't always appreciated. He "saves" Mittens's dolly from the seesaw, but Mittens herself was just playing, he "helps" Otus with the gardening but accidentally soaks Otus himself with a hose pipe in the process, and he heroically tries to get Apricot’s balloon out of a tree, which he pops while doing so. Finally, Super Hero Timmy gets the chance to save the day when his little pal Bumpy is nearly splattered by paint. Hooray for Super Timmy!
75	23	"Fix it Timmy"	28 September 2011
Harriet is doing odd jobs round the nursery and Timmy is eager to help out.He finds a toy tool belt and begins his round of odd jobs. Unfortunately his attempts at mending his friends' toys result in disaster: a wheel falls off Mittens' hobby horse, Ruffy's robot breaks and Ruffy's remote control car just grinds to a halt. Finally Harriet takes matters into her expert hands, and together her and Timmy make amends. Timmy learns how to mend things the right way with the right tools, and Harriet rewards him with a proper yellow hard hat of his own.
76	24	"Timmy and the Kite"	29 September 2011
Timmy and the class are thrilled to bits that their nursery activity is building and flying your very own kite. The friends are divided into pairs and a very enthusiastic if impatient Timmy is paired up with Otus, who painstakingly builds the kite with Timmy's 'help'. Timmy's excitement and impatience to fly the kite causes chaos damaging the kite at every stage until finally it lands on his head and rips. Timmy is mortified and makes up for wrecking Otus's hard work by patiently building another Kite and giving Otus an extra special surprise.
77	25	"Timmy's Castle"	30 September 2011
After a fun playtime activity of making a model castle, Timmy's imagination is all fired up. He wants to play at being Timmy the Knight, encountering dragons and saving Damsels in Distress. Along with Finlay, he dresses up as a knight and together they clippety-clop around the nursery on their trusty steeds – a customised broom and a hobby horse – and carry out several chivalrous deeds. The play acting bug takes over the whole nursery when together the pals all make a wonderful castle of their own out of big cardboard boxes and they all dress up. Timmy and Finlay's chivalrous spirit is put to the test when the friends hear what sounds like a real dragon.
78	26	"Timmy's Scrapbook"	3 October 2011
All the nursery pals are putting together scrapbooks of their most precious childhood memories: their first tuft of wool, photos of them as babies. Timmy ends up with one blank page left in his book and he's on a mission to find something perfect to put in there. All his attempts fail: the jam sandwich splodges and makes a mess, his self-portrait sculpture gets squished and the football just won't fit in no matter how hard he tries to shut the book. Finally, the scrapbook is in tatters and the disappointed Timmy gives up. His friends cheer him up by putting together a new scrapbook. And Timmy repays them by having the idea for a group photo they can all put in their scrapbooks.
79	27	"Timmy's Christmas Surprise"	12 December 2011
In Timmy's Christmas Surprise it's Christmas Eve and everyone is busy getting ready for Santa. It's not until home time they realise they are snowed in and will have to stay at the nursery. But will Santa know where to find Timmy and his friends if they are not at home in bed?
80	28	"Timmy's Seaside Rescue"	13 July 2012
Harriet Heron and Osbourne Owl take Timmy and his friends from the Nursery on an exciting excursion to the beach. When Timmy finds a beautiful shell, he runs off to show his friends leaving his teddy and Bumpy the caterpillar behind. Soon his teddy and Bumpy are swept out to sea. Will Timmy be able to rescue them?
