= Something Special (TV series) =

Children's television series

- Genre: Children's television series
- Created by: Allan Johnston; Justin Fletcher
- Directed by: Geoff Coward; Helen Sheppard (Series 1); Brian Little; Andy Burns; Kathryn Wolfe (Series 2)
- Presented by: Justin Fletcher; George Webster; Ben Cajee; Maddie Moate
- Composer: Archie Browne
- Country of origin: United Kingdom
- Original languages: English; Makaton
- No. of series: 13
- No. of episodes: 300

Production
- Executive producers: Yvonne Jennings (Series 1) Suzy Lamb; Vanessa Amberleigh (Series 2)
- Producers: Allan Johnston; Phillip Cooper, Anna Perowne (Series 1); Kieran Roberts (Series 2)
- Camera setup: Multi-camera (Series 1–2); Single-camera (Series 3–13)
- Running time: 15 minutes (Series 1–2); 20 minutes (Series 3–13)
- Production companies: BBC In-House Children's Unit (2003–2016); BBC Children's Productions (2017–2020); BBC Studios Kids & Family (2022–2025)

Original release
- Network: BBC Schools (2003-2004); CBeebies (2004-2025)
- Release: 1 September 2003 – 14 February 2025

Something Special is a British children's television programme starring and presented by Justin Fletcher. It was created and produced by Allan Johnston. It is broadcast by the BBC, debuting on 1 September 2003. It is designed to introduce children to Makaton signing, and is specifically aimed at children with delayed learning and communication difficulties. It is aired on the CBeebies channel and is currently the longest running CBeebies programme and the longest running preschool series in Britain. In the past, it started out as a BBC Schools programme in 2003, before being shown on CBeebies in 2004 (Channel) and 2005 (BBC Two).

The name of the programme derives from the idea that all children, irrespective of their position on the learning spectrum, are special. The format of the show has evolved considerably since the original series. In 2012, a new series, "Something Special – We're All Friends" started, introducing some minor changes to the "Out and About" format. This format change has also included a change in location, and introduced the Tumble Tapp, a personalised tablet computer showing the "special things" to look for. Beginning with Series 13, additional presenters alternate with Justin.

== Synopsis ==
It is presented by Justin Fletcher ("Justin") and features various other characters and clips of children with disabilities. Justin speaks as well as signing, and a spoken narrative is provided over the clips of children.

The other characters played by Fletcher are the Tumble Family. Mr Tumble, who is a clown, Grandad Tumble, Fisherman Tumble, Lord Tumble, Chef Tumble and Baker Tumble. Other members of the Tumble family have made appearances including two Aunts, Polly and Suki (as in the nursery rhyme "Polly Put the Kettle On") and Baby Tumble.

In Series 10, 3 animal characters were introduced to the series, Spotty the Horse, who is Mr Tumble's horse that has appeared in the episodes "Animals" and "Animal Keeper", Dennis the T-Rex, who is a dinosaur who has only appeared in the episode "Dinosaurs" (The T-Rex is also a display at Paultons Park where it was filmed) and Rudolph the Red-Nosed Reindeer, who appears in the episode "A Magical Christmas".

In 2025, the show added a new "rotating presenter" format; with Ben Cajee and Maddie Moate added to the presenting cast. Fellow CBeebies presenter George Webster, who was added to the cast in the previous season, will continue to make recurring appearances in episodes hosted by Fletcher.

== Format ==
Series 1 and 2 (2003–2006)
Justin showcases things in a white screen set, with the Mr Tumble sections in the middle of the episodes. Each episode has a duration of 15 minutes.

Mr Tumble shorts (2007)
From 2007, CBeebies occasionally showed short programmes consisting of the Mr Tumble sections from the various episodes, without the sections featuring Justin.

Series 3 - "Out and About" (2008)"
The first "Out and About" series featured Justin wandering out of the white screen set through the magic doors and into a different location set within the UK. Each episode has a duration of 20 minutes.

Series 4-6 - "Out and About" (2010–2011)"
Series 4 of the show followed the Out and About format of Series 3 and introduced a new character, Lord Tumble. The series has Mr Tumble and the other Tumble characters primarily based in "Tumble House", a large detached house located in extensive grounds close to the sea, located in Porlock, Somerset. The house and grounds are populated with large coloured spots, balloons and similar circular / spherical items in keeping with the spots on Mr Tumble's costume. The episodes typically feature Mr Tumble sending photographs of items he is interested in finding out about to Justin using his "Spotty Bag". Justin, with the assistance of the children with him, locates these items or activities and in return sends associated items back to Mr Tumble. There is typically a link in the theme between the actions of Mr Tumble and the other Tumble characters, and the activities Justin and the children participate in.

Series 7-12 "We're All Friends" (2012–2023)"
In 2012, a new series, "Something Special – We're All Friends" started, introducing some minor changes to the Out and About format. This format change included a change of location, and introduced the "Tumble Tapp", a tablet computer.

Series 13 (2025)
Mr Tumble sends the Spotty Bag to not just Justin, but Ben Cajee and Maddie Moate. The Adventures now take place at a green field and all the other Tumbles, except for Grandad Tumble, have been removed. At the end, the presenter and children take the Spotty Bag back to Mr Tumble for a Spotty Surprise.

== Series overview ==
Series	Episodes	Originally released	
Series	Episodes	First released	Last released
1	20	1 September 2003	25 September 2003
2	25	3 September 2006	27 September 2006
3	15	14 January 2008	1 February 2008
4	15	8 March 2010	26 March 2010
5	21	11 October 2010	24 December 2010
6	25	19 September 2011	11 November 2011
7	25	22 October 2012	14 December 2012
8	25	13 January 2014	14 March 2014
9	25	11 January 2016	12 February 2016
10	25	12 December 2017	8 March 2018
11	25	3 February 2020	14 November 2020
12	25	16 January 2023	2024
13	25	13 January 2025	14 February 2025

=== Series 1 (2003) ===
No. overall	No. in series	Title	Signs	Original release date
1	1	"Pets"	Dog / Cat / Fish / Rabbit	1 September 2003
2	2	"Weather"	Sun / Rain / Wind / Snow	2 September 2003
3	3	"Moving"	Walking / Clapping / Running / Jumping / Swimming	3 September 2003
4	4	"Garden"	Garden / Flower / Tree / Grass	4 September 2003
5	5	"Farm"	Cow / Sheep / Pig / Duck	5 September 2003
6	6	"Toys"	Ball / Teddy / Bricks / Doll	8 September 2003
7	7	"Clothes"	Shirt / Trousers / Shoes / Dress	9 September 2003
8	8	"School"	School / Teacher / Classroom / Friends / Boy / Girl / Toilet / Sitting Down / Drinking / Eating	10 September 2003
9	9	"Food"	Juice / Biscuits / Oranges / Bread / Apples / Cake	11 September 2003
10	10	"Family"	Mum / Dad / Brother / Family / Grandmother / Grandad	12 September 2003
11	11	"Transport"	Car / Aeroplane / Boat / Train	15 September 2003
12	12	"Colours"	Blue / Yellow / Green / Red	16 September 2003
13	13	"All About Me"	Body / Hands / Feet / Mouth / Getting Dressed / Washing Hands / Eating	17 September 2003
14	14	"Food Part 2"	Cheese / Eggs / Pizza	18 September 2003
15	15	"Under the Sea"	Fish / Octopus / Crab / Dolphin	19 September 2003
16	16	"Jungle Animals"	Monkey / Lion / Elephant / Snake / Crocodile	22 September 2003
17	17	"Where I Live"	House / Door / Window / Kitchen / Sitting Room / Bedroom	23 September 2003
18	18	"Shops"	Baker's Shop / Fruit Shop / Butcher's Shop / Sweet Shop	24 September 2003
19	19	"Music"	Piano / Drum / Tambourine / Triangle	25 September 2003
20	20	"What I Like"	Run / Play / Paint	25 September 2003

=== Series 2 (2006) ===
No. overall	No. in series	Title	Signs and Songs	Original release date
21	1	"Birds"	Owl / Swan / Penguin / Parrot	3 September 2006
22	2	"Meals"	Cereal / Toast / Egg	4 September 2006
23	3	"Toys 2"	Toy Horse / Space Rocket / Digger	5 September 2006
24	4	"Animals"	Kangaroo / Tiger / Gorilla / Giraffe	6 September 2006
25	5	"Nursery Rhymes and Songs 1"	Hickory Dickory Dock / Incy Wincy Spider / Twinkle Twinkle Little Star / Humpty Dumpty / Dingle Dangle Scarecrow	7 September 2006
26	6	"Mini Beasts"	A Tiny Black Spider / A Tiny Pink Worm / A Tiny Brown Snail	8 September 2006
27	7	"Birthday"	Birthday Card / Birthday Cake / Birthday Present	9 September 2006
28	8	"Under, On and In"	The Bag is "Under" the Table / The Swimming Goggles are "On" the Chair / The Swimming Costume is "In" the Box	10 September 2006
29	9	"Holiday"	Sea / Sand / Bucket and Spade / Shells	11 September 2006
30	10	"Nursery Rhymes and Songs 2"	Walking Through The Jungle / Little Peter Rabbit / The Little Green Frog / Hey Diddle Diddle / Five Little Ducks	12 September 2006
31	11	"Vegetables"	Cauliflower / Onion / Potato	13 September 2006
32	12	"Seasons"	Summer / Autumn / Winter / Spring	14 September 2006
33	13	"Shapes"	Square / Triangle / Rectangle / Circle	15 September 2006
34	14	"Clothes"	Coat / Scarf / Gloves / Hat	16 September 2006
35	15	"Nursery Rhymes and Songs 3"	A Sailor Went To Sea / I Am the Music Man / Jack and Jill / Little Jack Horner / Little Miss Muffet / Keep on Dancing	17 September 2006
36	16	"Baby"	Nappy / Rattle / Bottle	18 September 2006
37	17	"Doctor"	Sore Knee / Tummy Ache / Sore Throat	19 September 2006
38	18	"Art"	Paper / Paint / Paintbrush	20 September 2006
39	19	"Opposites"	Go / Stop / Up / Down / In / Out	21 September 2006
40	20	"Nursery Rhymes and Songs 4"	Once I Caught a Fish Alive / Baa Baa Black Sheep / Five Little Speckled Frogs / Five In The Bed / Five Currant Buns	22 September 2006
41	21	"How Do I Feel?"	Happy / Sad / Excited / Cross	23 September 2006
42	22	"Baby Animals"	Puppy / Kitten / Lamb / Kid	24 September 2006
43	23	"People Who Help Us"	Postman / Policewoman / Nurse / Dentist	25 September 2006
44	24	"The Park"	Seasaw / Swing / Roundabout / Slide	26 September 2006
45	25	"Nursery Rhymes and Songs 5"	Row Row Row Your Boat / I Dig My Garden / Polly Put The Kettle On / Here We Go Round The Mulberry Bush	27 September 2006

=== Series 3: Out and About (2008) ===
No. overall	No. in series	Title	3 Special Things	Tumble Sign	Original release date
46	1	"Farm"	Farmer / Hen / Tractor	Scarecrow	14 January 2008
The scarecrow is broken and Mr. Tumble is trying to fix it. (Dundonald)
47	2	"Wood"	Signpost / Squirrel / Log	Picnic	15 January 2008
Mr. Tumble is having a teddy bears picnic in the wood. (Banstead)
48	3	"Harbour"	Fishing Boat / Life Jacket / Blue Flag	Seagull	16 January 2008
Mr. Tumble tries to paint a Fishing Boat or a Seagull. But they keep getting away! Luckily Grandad Tumble painted a picture for him. (Weymouth)
49	4	"Theme Park"	Carousel / Tiny Truck / Big Wheel	Umbrella	17 January 2008
Mr. Tumble is too scared to go on rides. But he found one and wants to go on it again! (Chessington World of Adventures)
50	5	"Stables"	White Pony / Saddle / Riding Hat	Reins	18 January 2008
Mr. Tumble goes horse riding on a horse named Bobby. (Moy)
51	6	"Mountain"	Path / Lake / Mountain	Stream	21 January 2008
Mr. Tumble's toy duck wants to go swimming in the mountains. (Snowdon)
52	7	"Vet"	Vet / Medicine / Tortoise	Thermometer	22 January 2008
Polar Bear and Zebra are feeling poorly and Mr. Tumble is making them better. (Wokingham)
53	8	"High Street"	Post Box / Hairdressers / Florist	Library	23 January 2008
Mr. Tumble is at the library looking for his favourite book. (Enniskillen)
54	9	"Beach"	Rock Pool / Seaweed / Ice Cream	Towel	24 January 2008
Mr. Tumble is making a picture in the sand. But what is it? (Bowleaze Cove)
55	10	"School"	Wheelchair / Computer / Playground	Music Room	25 January 2008
Mr. Tumble is teaching the class about music but none of his musical instruments are working. (Lindon Bennett School, Hanworth)
56	11	"Railway"	Ticket Office / Train Driver / Flag	Platform	28 January 2008
Mr. Tumble was so busy tidying the platform he didn't realise that his watch had stopped and now the train is coming to the station! (Corfe Castle)
57	12	"Market"	Bread Rolls / Cheese / Pink Plant	Mirror	29 January 2008
Mr. Tumble is selling everything in his stall. (St. George's Market)
58	13	"Football"	Footballer / Football Boots / Goal	Goal Keeper	30 January 2008
Mr. Tumble and Grandad Tumble play football in the garden. (Craven Cottage)
59	14	"Camping"	Tent / Water Tap / Barbecue	Sleeping Bag	31 January 2008
Mr. Tumble tries to put up his tent and tires to have a rest in his sleeping bag. (New Forest)
60	15	"Castle"	Princess / Prince / Throne	Queen	1 February 2008
Mr. Tumble is dressing up as King Tumble. (Carrickfergus)

=== Series 4: Out and About (2010) ===
No. overall	No. in series	Title	3 Special Things	Tumble Sign	Original release date
61	1	"Airport"	Helicopter / Fire Engine / Pilot	Kite	8 March 2010
Mr Tumble wants to try and fly with a little help of Grandad Tumble and Lord Tumble.
62	2	"City"	Double-Decker Bus / Shops / Fountain	Bus Stop	9 March 2010
Mr Tumble is going to the city, but he missed the bus. So Mr Tumble goes to the city on a bike with Aunt Polly instead.
63	3	"Garden Centre"	Wheelbarrow / Yellow Plant / Flowerpot	Digger	10 March 2010
Mr Tumble looks for a hole to plant his flower.
64	4	"By The Sea"	Chair Lift / Lighthouse / Game	Chocolate	11 March 2010
Mr Tumble is a pirate looking for his treasure.
65	5	"Hospital"	Nurse / Pyjamas / Toast	Grapes	12 March 2010
Mr Tumble visits Grandad Tumble in hospital.
66	6	"Houseboat"	Suitcase / Windmill / Duck	Scooter	15 March 2010
Mr Tumble tries to find a good place to put up his tent.
67	7	"Leisure Centre"	Swimming Pool / Float / Bouncy Castle	Egg Cup	16 March 2010
Mr Tumble takes part in a Sports day, but he fails every single event. But is given an egg cup for taking part.
68	8	"Animal Park"	Snake / Fruit and Vegetables / Owl	Tiger	17 March 2010
Mr Tumble is looking for his animal.
69	9	"Playdate"	Sitting Room / Stairs / Kitchen	Cousin	18 March 2010
Mr Tumble's cousin, Cool Tumble comes to visit and they play musical bumps, build dens and play Hide-and-seek.
70	10	"Animal Rescue"	Spotty Dog / Rabbit / Ginger Cat	Paddling Pool	19 March 2010
Mr Tumble looks after Aunt Suki's dog.
71	11	"Bike Ride"	Bike / Stream / Bench	Cycle Helmet	22 March 2010
Mr Tumble is pretending to be a postman, so he uses a bicycle to deliver parcels to Lord Tumble, Aunt Polly and Grandad Tumble.
72	12	"Creative Walk"	Sheep / Pig / Donkey	Peacock	23 March 2010
Mr Tumble paints a picture of a peacock.
73	13	"Supermarket"	Shopping Trolley / Pineapple / Bowls	Toilet Roll	24 March 2010
Mr Tumble brings his shopping home with help from Lord Tumble. But Lord Tumble puts everything in the wrong place.
74	14	"Butterfly"	Caterpillar / Red Flower / Café	Video Camera	25 March 2010
Mr Tumble tries to film a butterfly with his new video camera, but it keeps flying away.
75	15	"Drive"	School Bus / Car Wash / Playground	Bubbles	26 March 2010
Mr Tumble cleans his car using bubbles from Grandad Tumble's bath.

=== Series 5: Out and About (2010) ===
No. overall	No. in series	Title	3 Special Things	Tumble Sign	Original release date
76	1	"Nature Trail"	Pond / Tree Branch / Meadow	Lunch	11 October 2010
Mr Tumble goes fishing with Big Teddy.
77	2	"Play"	Water Play / Sandpit / Parachute	Play	12 October 2010
Mr Tumble is playing some games with Grandad Tumble and Lord Tumble.
78	3	"Sport"	Trampoline / Ramp / Ice Rink	Sports Clothes	13 October 2010
Aunt Polly, Lord Tumble and Grandad Tumble show Mr Tumble how to do some exercises.
79	4	"Island"	Island / Grey Seal / Postcards	Fisherman	14 October 2010
Mr Tumble is visiting his friend Fisherman Tumble and helping him get ready to go out on his fishing boat. But the tide has gone out. So they pretended to catch fish instead.
80	5	"Festival"	Breakfast / Face Painting / Band	Guitar	15 October 2010
Grandad Tumble puts on a concert for Mr Tumble and the toys!
81	6	"London"	Bridge / Statue / Big Wheel	Palace	18 October 2010
Mr Tumble has lots of fun at home with his London book.
82	7	"Art"	Feet / Sponge / Toy Car	Rainbow	19 October 2010
Mr Tumble paints a rainbow on Grandad Tumble's shed as a surprise. But Mr Tumble is missing some paint.
83	8	"Baby"	High Chair / Baby Bath / Buggy	Baby	20 October 2010
Mr Tumble gets ready for a very special baby visitor of his own.
84	9	"Village Fete"	Coconut / Cake Stall / Toy Duck	Horse	21 October 2010
Mr Tumble holds his own Village Fete for the toys!
85	10	"Big Animals"	Giraffe / Hippopotamus / Elephant	Hamster	22 October 2010
Mr Tumble is cleaning out Harry the Hamster's cage. But who is looking after Harry?
86	11	"Music"	Guitar / Drum Kit / Microphone	Popstar	25 October 2010
Mr Tumble wants to be a popstar after watching his favourite singer Cliff Tumble on TV.
87	12	"Strawberry Picking"	Strawberry Field / Scales / Strawberry Jam	Fruit	26 October 2010
Mr Tumble is very hungry and goes looking for fruit in the garden.
88	13	"Cooking"	Knife / Cherries / Teacher	Salad	27 October 2010
Mr Tumble is making something very special for Grandad Tumble's lunch.
89	14	"Sleepover"	Bedroom / Sausages / Warm Drink	Quiet	28 October 2010
Mr Tumble is having a sleepover of his own in his garden.
90	15	"Routines"	Bread Roll / Laptop / Cricket Bat	Toothbrush	29 October 2010
Mr Tumble shows us what he does before he goes to bed.
91	16	"Birthday Party"	Parcel / Party Food / CD	Birthday Party	22 November 2010
All the Tumbles are doing a surprise party for Lord Tumble.
92	17	"Shopping"	Saree / Jewellery / Sweets	Glasses	23 November 2010
Mr Tumble is doing his washing and needs to find some spare clothes to wear.
93	18	"Café"	Menu / Waitress / Purse	Chef	24 November 2010
Mr Tumble opens his new Café and we are introduced to the all new Chef Tumble!
94	19	"Forest Art"	Leaf / Twig / Feather	Bear	25 November 2010
Mr Tumble is in his forest looking for animals from inside his den!
95	20	"Park"	Slide / Maze / Dragon Boat	Sailboat	26 November 2010
Mr Tumble is trying to find a boat of his own to go on a sea adventure.
96	21	"Christmas"	Christmas Tree / Christmas Presents (Missing) / Christmas Choir	n/a	24 December 2010
It's Christmas and Mr Tumble, Lord Tumble and Grandad Tumble are decorating the Tumble house. Meanwhile, Justin and his friends haven't got any Christmas presents, but Mr Tumble and Father Christmas brought them back just in time.

=== Series 6: Out and About (2011) ===
No. overall	No. in series	Title	3 Special Things	Tumble Sign	Original release date
97	1	"Baking"	Rolling Pin / Pastry Cutter / Raisins	Cake	19 September 2011
Mr Tumble bakes some delicious cakes and Chef Tumble wants to have a cooking competition with him.
98	2	"Music"	Musical Instruments / Dressing Gown / Bed	Winner	20 September 2011
Mr Tumble has made a stage and is organising a singing competition between Aunt Polly and Grandad Tumble.
99	3	"Shop for School"	Shoe Shop / Pencil Case / Lift	Skateboard	21 September 2011
Mr Tumble goes cycling but crashes his pushbike.
100	4	"Sensory Garden"	Xylophone / Blossom / Blue Flower	Black Hat	22 September 2011
Mr Tumble plays a looking game called I Spy.
101	5	"Space"	Spacesuit / Rocket / Moon	Spaceman	23 September 2011
Mr Tumble wants to get to the moon, but he needs a rocket and a spacesuit.
102	6	"Snow"	Warm Coat / Snow / Sledge	Snowflake	26 September 2011
Mr Tumble wants to play in the snow but it's not snowing outside. Maybe Lord Tumble can help with a bit of magic.
103	7	"Scouts"	Emily the Beaver Scout / Experiment Badge / Scarf	Warm Fire	27 September 2011
Scout Tumble has come to stay.
104	8	"Pet Shop"	Pet Shop / Guinea Pigs / Guinea Pig Food	Bone	28 September 2011
Aunt Polly looks after a dog named Chip while Mr Tumble is off to the shops to buy a bone for him.
105	9	"Rainy Day"	Dressing-Up Box / Pretend Shop / Puddle	Paddling Pool	29 September 2011
Mr Tumble wants to play in his paddling pool, but it's raining outside, so he decides to play a dressing-up game indoors instead.
106	10	"Allotment"	Compost / Seeds / Pea Pods	Prawn	30 September 2011
Mr Tumble has grown so many vegetables that he decides to go to the harbour to sell them.
107	11	"Friends"	Friend "Reece" / Bowling Alley / Mini Golf	Best Friends	3 October 2011
Mr Tumble is playing with his friend Lord Tumble. But Mr Tumble doesn't like losing and is very rude to Lord Tumble.
108	12	"Doctor"	Waiting Room / Stethoscope / Doctor's Bag	Hot Water Bottle	4 October 2011
Aunt Polly and Grandad Tumble are feeling poorly.
109	13	"Rugby"	Rugby Kit / Rugby Ball / Rugby Posts	Ball Pool	5 October 2011
Mr Tumble is looking for Grandad Tumble's old rugby ball.
110	14	"Weekend"	Mummy / Daddy / Grandma and Grandad	Hungry	6 October 2011
All the Tumbles are getting together for Lord Tumble's lunch.
111	15	"Outside"	Samba Drum / Headdress / Dancers	Fairy	7 October 2011
Lord Tumble is having a fancy dress party and all the Tumbles have been invited.
112	16	"Pony Trekking"	Gate / Wild Pony / Spotty Rug	Horseriding	31 October 2011
Mr Tumble wants to go out for a ride on a horse but Lord Tumble and Grandad Tumble have other ideas.
113	17	"Getting Arty"	T-Shirt / Bracelet / Audience	Smile, please	1 November 2011
Mr Tumble is taking photographs of Aunt Polly and Grandad Tumble.
114	18	"Wildlife"	Red Squirrel / Deer / Hedgehog	Goose	2 November 2011
Mr Tumble tries to find a big bird in the garden.
115	19	"Trip Away"	Pier / Giant Turtle / Train	Caravan	3 November 2011
Mr Tumble is busy getting ready for his holiday.
116	20	"Zookeeper"	Rhino / Chimpanzee / Sea Lion	Warm Blanket	4 November 2011
Mr Tumble finds out what it's like to be an animal.
117	21	"Cars"	Old Car / Motorbike / Double-Decker Bus	Cool Car	7 November 2011
Mr Tumble decides that his car needs a makeover.
118	22	"Baby Animals"	1 Lamb / 2 Chicks / 3 Piglets	Counting	8 November 2011
Mr Tumble runs a baker's shop with five current buns.
119	23	"Yurts"	Family / Hen / Campfire	Share	9 November 2011
Mr Tumble is feeling poorly and Aunt Polly is looking after him.
120	24	"Adventure"	Climbing Wall / Horse and Carriage / Kayak	Strong	10 November 2011
Mr Tumble is warming up for a competition to find the strongest Tumble.
121	25	"Theme Park"	Height Chart / Swing Ride / Rollercoaster	Pirate Boat	11 November 2011
Mr. Tumble wants to ride a boat. Luckily Fisherman Tumble knows just the place. (Paultons Park)

=== Mr Tumble's Special Day Out (2012) ===
No.	Title	Original release date
122	"Mr Tumble's Special Day Out"	11 February 2012

=== Series 7: We're All Friends (2012) ===
No. overall	No. in series	Title	3 Special Things	Original release date
123	1	"Motor Home"	Grandma and Grandad / Motor Home / Campsite	22 October 2012
124	2	"Concert"	Singer / Choir / Stage	23 October 2012
125	3	"Art"	Picture / Paint / Frame	24 October 2012
126	4	"Police"	Police Officer / Police Dog / Police Car	25 October 2012
127	5	"Donkey"	Donkey / Carrots / Stable	26 October 2012
128	6	"Gymnastics"	Rings / Trampoline / Obstacle Course	29 October 2012
129	7	"Chadani's Day"	Special Clothes / Fruit and Nuts / Chapati	30 October 2012
130	8	"Cheerleaders"	Pom-Poms / School Mascot / Teams	31 October 2012
131	9	"Monkey"	Monkey / Bananas / Playground	1 November 2012
132	10	"Waterpark"	Waves / Water Slide / Fish and Chips	2 November 2012
133	11	"Circus"	Stilts / Tight Wire / Harness	5 November 2012
134	12	"Ferry"	Ferry / Camera / Tumble Tap	6 November 2012
135	13	"Fishing"	Fish / Fishing Rod / Picnic	7 November 2012
136	14	"Chocolate"	Chocolate / Lollipop / Gift	8 November 2012
137	15	"Football"	Stadium / Football Shirt / Footballer	9 November 2012
138	16	"Narrowboat"	Narrowboat / Canal / Lock	3 December 2012
139	17	"Ice Cream"	Milk / Ice Cream / Ice Cream Cone	4 December 2012
140	18	"My Pets"	Rabbit / Dog / Gerbil	5 December 2012
141	19	"Lifeboat"	Stones / Lifeboat / Life Jacket	6 December 2012
142	20	"Castle"	Castle / Crown / Throne	7 December 2012
143	21	"Birds"	Butterfly / Bird / Wings	10 December 2012
144	22	"Outdoors"	Canoe / Hot Chocolate / Zip Wire	11 December 2012
145	23	"Pottery"	Clay / Bowl / Plate	12 December 2012
146	24	"Cycling"	Wheels / Flag / Medal	13 December 2012
147	25	"Ceilidh"	Shortbread Biscuits / Ceilidh Band / Dance Floor	14 December 2012

=== Series 8: We're All Friends (2014) ===
No. overall	No. in series	Title	3 Special Things	Original release date
148	1	"Pig Washing"	Pig / Water Tap / Pigsty	13 January 2014
149	2	"Snow Tubing"	Gloves / Ski Lift / Ski Slope	14 January 2014
150	3	"Fire Station"	Fire Engine / Fire Fighter / Hose	15 January 2014
151	4	"Dance"	Dancer / Piano / Tickets	16 January 2014
152	5	"Boat Trip"	Boat / Bridge / Steering Wheel	17 January 2014
153	6	"Horse Riding by the Sea"	Horse / Riding Hat / Beach	20 January 2014
154	7	"Post Office"	Coloured Paper / Paint / Post Office	21 January 2014
155	8	"Train"	Railway Station / Train / Ticket Inspector	22 January 2014
156	9	"Camping"	Tent / Kite / Picnic Basket	23 January 2014
157	10	"Wildlife Park"	Baboon / Giraffe / Lemur	24 January 2014
158	11	"Seven Stories"	Book / Tiger / Chair	27 January 2014
159	12	"Sport"	Running Track / Sand / Javelin	28 January 2014
160	13	"Hats"	Hat / Policeman's Hat / Feathers	29 January 2014
161	14	"Dog Walking"	Brush / Dog Bowl / Duck	30 January 2014
162	15	"Adventure Playground"	Playground / Slide / Swing	31 January 2014
163	16	"Aquarium"	Crab / Fish / Octopus	3 March 2014
164	17	"Cafe"	Cafe / Menu / Waiter	4 March 2014
165	18	"Music"	Musical Instruments / Animals / Drum	5 March 2014
166	19	"Fruit and Veg Picking"	Potatoes / Raspberries / Weighing Scales	6 March 2014
167	20	"Farm"	Sheep / Cow / Chicken	7 March 2014
168	21	"Planetarium"	Planet Earth / Rocket / Stickers	10 March 2014
169	22	"Beach"	Sea / Ball / Sandcastle	11 March 2014
170	23	"Shopping"	Bus / Shopping Basket / Ice Cream	12 March 2014
171	24	"Cookery"	Apron / Rolling Pin / Cheese	13 March 2014
172	25	"Wetlands Centre"	Magnifying Glass / Tree / Bird	14 March 2014

=== Series 9: We're All Friends (2016) ===
No. overall	No. in series	Title	3 Special Things	Tumble Sign	Original release date
173	1	"Party"	Decorations / Guests / Birthday Present	Birthday	11 January 2016
174	2	"Counting"	Tortoise / Tapir / Penguin	Counting	12 January 2016
175	3	"Wet and Dry"	Water / Sand / Sensory Garden	Wet	13 January 2016
176	4	"Imagination"	Pirate Ship / Flag / Treasure	Doctor	14 January 2016
177	5	"Bedtime"	Sensory Room / Star / Story	Bedtime	15 January 2016
178	6	"Growing"	Plant Pot / Vegetables / Scarecrow	Grow	18 January 2016
179	7	"Family"	Daddy / Sister / Mummy	Family	19 January 2016
180	8	"In and Out"	Cotton Wool / Garden / Wheel	Hide-and-Seek	20 January 2016
181	9	"Colours"	Paint / Dressing Room / Audience	Rainbow	21 January 2016
182	10	"Breakfast"	Chicken / Egg / Scrambled Egg	Breakfast	22 January 2016
183	11	"Animals"	Pony / Wellies / Jump	Horse	25 January 2016
184	12	"Adventure"	Binoculars / Climbing Wall / Sledge	Boat	26 January 2016
185	13	"Up and Down"	Cliff Lift / Waves / Bucket	Up and Down	27 January 2016
186	14	"Happy"	Dressing-up Box / Ukulele / Friends	Happy	28 January 2016
187	15	"Lunchtime"	Sandwich / Fruit / Picnic Blanket	Lunchtime	29 January 2016
188	16	"Vehicles"	Tractor / Boat / Steering Wheel	Surprise	1 February 2016
189	17	"Weather"	Classroom / Window / Park	Weather	2 February 2016
190	18	"Quiet and Loud"	Dance Teacher / Tap Shoes / Ballet Shoes	Quiet	3 February 2016
191	19	"Recycling"	Recycling Box / Musical Shaker / Band	Tidy	4 February 2016
192	20	"Teatime"	Restaurant / Spices / Knife and Fork	Teatime	5 February 2016
193	21	"Summer"	Pier / Beach Bag / Kite	Armbands	8 February 2016
194	22	"Hobbies"	Football / Powerchair / Whistle	Hobby	9 February 2016
195	23	"Big and Small"	Model Village / Toy People / Mouse	Big and Small	10 February 2016
196	24	"Pets"	Dog / Loch / Café	Pet	11 February 2016
197	25	"Friends"	Mixing Bowl / Cake Case / Stall	Best Friend	12 February 2016

=== Christmas Special (2017) ===
No.	Title	3 Special Things	Tumble Sign	Original release date
198	"A Magical Christmas"	Elf / Present / Father Christmas	Merry Christmas	12 December 2017

=== Series 10: We're All Friends (2018) ===
No. overall	No. in series	Title	3 Special Things	Tumble Sign	Original release date
199	1	"Great Outdoors"	Den / Owl / Campfire	Tent	22 January 2018
200	2	"Winter"	Gloves / Ice Skates / Ice Rink	Den	24 January 2018
201	3	"My School"	Classroom / Dog / Pizza	Teacher	24 January 2018
202	4	"Radio Star"	Recording Studio / Microphone / Headphones	Radio	25 January 2018
203	5	"In the Mood for Dancing"	Wheelchair / Costume / Ballroom	Dance Partner	26 January 2018
204	6	"Animal Keeper"	Animal Keeper / Meerkat / Pig	Jump	29 January 2018
205	7	"Star Chart"	Dance Shoes / Dance Teacher / Tambourine	Star Chart	30 January 2018
206	8	"Hairdressers"	Hairdresser / Hairbrush / Mirror	Hair	31 January 2018
207	9	"Monkeying Around"	Market Stall / Monkey / Lemur	Hide-and-Seek	1 February 2018
208	10	"Dinosaurs"	Dinosaur / Safari Hat / Fossil	Present	2 February 2018
209	11	"Library"	Library / Library Card / Café	Book	19 February 2018
210	12	"Fairies"	Fairy / Magic Wand / Bubbles	Fairycake	20 February 2018
211	13	"Dentist"	Dentist / Teeth / Sticker	Toothpaste	21 February 2018
212	14	"Spring"	Lamb / Chick / Goat	Spring	22 February 2018
213	15	"Theatre"	Theatre / Stage / Ice Cream	Magic Show	23 February 2018
214	16	"Superheroes"	Superhero / Cape / Tower	Superpowers	26 February 2018
215	17	"Summer"	Sunhat / Water Toy / Fish	Rose	27 February 2018
216	18	"New Shoes"	Shoe Shop / Foot / Shoes	Shop	28 February 2018
217	19	"Pairs"	Twins / Playing Cards / Signing Choir	Breakfast	1 March 2018
218	20	"Getting Sporty"	Boogie Board / Wet Suit / Sea	Trophy	2 March 2018
219	21	"Autumn"	Sensory Room / Leaf / Bird Feeder	Autumn	5 March 2018
220	22	"Music Stars"	Piano / Drum Kit / Fans	Talent	6 March 2018
221	23	"Vets"	Waiting Room / Vet / Collar	Animal	7 March 2018
222	24	"Imaginary Journey"	Platform / Whistle / Ticket	Alien	8 March 2018

=== Something Special at the Proms (2018) ===
No.	Title	3 Special Things	Original release date
223	"Something Special at the Proms"	Royal Albert Hall / Ticket / Orchestra	8 September 2018

=== Series 11: We're All Friends (2020) ===
No. overall	No. in series	Title	3 Special Things	Tumble Sign	Original release date
224	1	"Basketball"	Basketball Player / Basketball / Basketball Hoop	Bouncy Ball	3 February 2020
225	2	"On the River"	Buoyancy Aid / Paddle / Bell Boat	Duck	4 February 2020
226	3	"Golf"	Rocket / Golf Club / Flag	Hole-in-One	5 February 2020
227	4	"Down on the Farm"	Chicken / Egg / Paint	Worm	6 February 2020
228	5	"Theme Park Adventure"	Face Painter / Maze / Rollercoaster	Bedtime	7 February 2020
229	6	"Dragon School"	Dragon / Spoon / Parade	Photograph	10 February 2020
230	7	"Flying Fun"	Feather / Glove / Hawk	Aeroplane	11 February 2020
231	8	"Fairytale"	Tower / Musician / Storybook	Pumpkin	12 February 2020
232	9	"Beach, Boats and Birds"	Island / Captain / Bird	Beach	13 February 2020
233	10	"Animal Antics"	Animal Handler / Snake / Sock	Frog	14 February 2020
234	11	"Day Trip"	Horse / Canal Boat / Rudder	Car	17 February 2020
235	12	"Woof!"	Dog / Shampoo / Dog Treat	Wagging Tail	18 February 2020
236	13	"Fruity Fun"	Basket / Scales / Jam	Strawberry	19 February 2020
237	14	"Under the Sea"	Starfish / Diver / Shark Tank	Bubbles	20 February 2020
238	15	"Farmyard Fun"	Farmer / Alpaca / Lead	Farm	21 February 2020
239	16	"Magic Castle"	Wizard / Magic Wand / Broomstick	Magic Trick	16 March 2020
240	17	"Let's Pretend"	Chef's Hat / Pizza Restaurant / Ingredients	Jumper	17 March 2020
241	18	"Splish Splash Splosh"	Lifeguard / Waves / Water Slide	Rain	18 March 2020
242	19	"Treasure Hunt"	Map / Watering Can / Prize	Cake	19 March 2020
243	20	"Back in Time"	Costume / Shop / Bakery	Clock	20 March 2020
244	21	"Paints and Pottery"	Apron / Teapot / Fingerprint	Artist	23 March 2020
245	22	"Boating Fun"	Marina / Toy Boat / Pedalo	Flamingo	24 March 2020
246	23	"Disco Party"	Music Room / DJ / Swimming Pool	Disco	25 March 2020
247	24	"Football Skills"	Football Kit / Football / Goal	Team	3 October 2020
248	25	"Happy Diwali!"	Kitchen / Knife and Fork / Family	Diwali	14 November 2020

=== Mr Tumble's Busy Bus Day (2022) ===
No.	Title	Original release date
249	"Mr Tumble's Busy Bus Day"	15 April 2022

=== Christmas Special (2022) ===
No.	Title	3 Special Things	Tumble Sign	Original release date
250	"Merry Christmas!"	Star / Christmas Tree / Donkey	Merry Christmas	8 December 2022

=== Series 12: We're All Friends (2023-2024) ===
No. overall	No. in series	Title	3 Special Things	Tumble Sign	Original release date
251	1	"Cinema"	Ticket / Popcorn / Seats	Actor	16 January 2023
252	2	"Eye Test"	Eye / Eye Test / Glasses	New	17 January 2023
253	3	"Trampolining"	Socks / Trampoline / Slide	Bounce	18 January 2023
254	4	"Outdoor Adventure"	Trees / Climb / Ride	Nervous	19 January 2023
255	5	"A Big Concert!"	Room / Musical Instruments / Invitation	A Big Concert	20 January 2023
256	6	"The Zoo"	Lemur / Binoculars / Elephant	Playtime	23 January 2023
257	7	"Beach Day"	Nana / Bucket and Spade / Sandcastle	Beach	24 January 2023
258	8	"Stories"	Books / Key / Treasure Chest	Sleep	25 January 2023
259	9	"George's Cafe"	Cafe / Menu / Napkin	Cake	26 January 2023
260	10	"Alpacas"	Alpaca / Apple / Field	Sit	27 January 2023
261	11	"A Day in the Woods"	Forest / Sticks / Bugs	Rabbit	30 January 2023
262	12	"Aeroplanes"	Aeroplane / Suitcase / Pilot	Hotel	20 February 2023
263	13	"Pancake Making"	Flour / Whisk / Fruit	Frying Pan	21 February 2023
264	14	"Ice Cream Farm"	Cow / Milk / Ice Cream	Water	22 February 2023
265	15	"Let's Go Camping"	Rucksack / Game / Campfire	Tent	23 February 2023
266	16	"Putting on a Play"	Stage / Costumes / Audience	Theatre	24 February 2023
267	17	"Bubble Fun"	Bubbles / Bubble Wand / Party	Bath	27 February 2023
268	18	"Outdoor Games"	Bicycle / Helmet / Flag	Race	28 February 2023
269	19	"Shooting Stars"	Rocket / Spacesuit / Planetarium	Shooting Star	1 March 2023
270	20	"Growing Vegetables"	Seeds / Vegetables / Broad Beans	Carrot	2 March 2023
271	21	"Bowling"	Bowling Alley / Tablet / Bowling Pins	Shiny	3 March 2023
272	22	"Fishing"	Fish / Wellies / Island	Fishing Rod	6 March 2023
273	23	"Summer Party"	Greenhouse / Tablecloth / People	Garden	7 March 2023
274	24	"???"	???	???	2024
275	25	"Eid Mubarak!"	Clothes / Wash / Feast	Eid	21 April 2023

=== Series 13: We're All Friends (2025) ===
No. overall	No. in series	Title	3 Special Clues	Presenter	Original release date
276	1	"Get Set Gardening"	Seeds / Garden / Plant	Justin Fletcher	13 January 2025
277	2	"Nature Gathering"	Stick / Picture / Flower	Maddie Moate	14 January 2025
278	3	"Let's Go Camping"	Forest / Tent / Campfire	Ben Cajee	15 January 2025
279	4	"How's the Weather"	Hat / Rainbow / Ice Cream	Justin Fletcher	16 January 2025
280	5	"Roar Roar Dinosaur"	Binoculars / Dinosaur / Fossil	Maddie Moate	17 January 2025
281	6	"Tea Party"	Bowl / Invitation / Cake	Ben Cajee	20 January 2025
282	7	"Emotions"	Bubbles / Calm / Dough	Justin Fletcher	21 January 2025
283	8	"Where We Live"	Street / Map / Bus	Maddie Moate	22 January 2025
284	9	"Hide and Seek"	Tree / Hiding / Magnifying Glass	Ben Cajee	23 January 2025
285	10	"Jump"	Blocks / Frog / Trampoline	Justin Fletcher	24 January 2025
286	11	"Keep it Colourful"	Ball / Colour / Paint	Maddie Moate	27 January 2025
287	12	"Insects"	Bee / Insect / Caterpillar	Ben Cajee	28 January 2025
288	13	"Lunar New Year"	Horse / Table / Food	Ben Cajee	29 January 2025
289	14	"My Body"	Foot / Dancing / Hand	Maddie Moate	30 January 2025
290	15	"Skiing"	Coat / Helmet / Ski Slope	Justin Fletcher	31 January 2025
291	16	"Pick Your Own"	Fruit / Shop / Cucumber	Justin Fletcher	3 February 2025
292	17	"Get Ready Go"	Cereal / Sleepy / Toothbrush	Maddie Moate	4 February 2025
293	18	"On the Farm Trail"	Farm / Muddy / Chicken	Ben Cajee	5 February 2025
294	19	"Sports Day"	Running Track / Swimming / Medal	Justin Fletcher	6 February 2025
295	20	"Time For Bed"	Teddy Bear / Goodnight / Pyjamas	Maddie Moate	7 February 2025
296	21	"Dressing Up"	Clothes / Dressing Up / Crown	Ben Cajee	10 February 2025
297	22	"The Wheels Go Round"	Wheel / Driving / Tractor	Justin Fletcher	11 February 2025
298	23	"At the Doctors"	Waiting Room / Doctor / Bandage	Maddie Moate	12 February 2025
299	24	"Loud and Quiet"	Playground / Loud / Grass	Ben Cajee	13 February 2025
300	25	"Mum and Me"	Mum / Hug / Scarf	Justin Fletcher	14 February 2025

== Home media releases ==
Dvd title	Release date
Hello Mr Tumble!	24 May 2010
Where Are You Now Mr Tumble?	25 October 2010
Time For Mr Tumble!	4 April 2011
Mr Tumble and Friends!	17 October 2011
How Are You Now Mr Tumble?	26 March 2012
Mr Tumble and Me!	10 September 2012
Exploring with Mr Tumble	1 April 2013
Sporty Time with Mr Tumble	8 July 2013
Days Out with Friends	17 February 2014
Fun with Mr Tumble	16 February 2015
King of the Castle	28 September 2015

== Theatre show ==
In 2015, a theatrical production called The Tale of Mr Tumble was performed, starring Justin Fletcher as Mr Tumble and Ronni Ancona as The Unsmiling Principle. The show follows the Mr Tumble character as a baby and as a young boy. A filmed version of The Tale of Mr Tumble aired on CBeebies in March 2016.

== Awards ==
Year	Award	Category	Nominee	Result	Ref.
2004	Royal Television Society; Educational Television Awards	Best Early Years Programme	Episode: "Garden"	Won	
2005	BAFTA Children's Awards	Best Pre-school Live Action Series		Won	
2007	BAFTA Children's Awards	Best Presenter	Justin Fletcher	Nominated	
2008	BAFTA Children's Awards	Best Presenter	Justin Fletcher	Won	
2009	BAFTA Children's Awards	Best Presenter	Justin Fletcher	Nominated	
2010	BAFTA Children's Awards	Best Presenter	Justin Fletcher	Won	
2011	BAFTA Children's Awards	Best Presenter	Justin Fletcher	Nominated	
2012	BAFTA Children's Awards	Best Presenter	Justin Fletcher	Won	
2013	BAFTA Children's Awards	Best Presenter	Justin Fletcher	Nominated	
2018	BAFTA Children's Awards	Best Presenter	Justin Fletcher	Won	
