= Showreel =

Short demo video

An example of a cinematography showreel

A showreel (also known as a demo reel, sizzle reel, or work reel) is a short video showcasing a person's previous work used by people involved in filmmaking and other media, including actors, animators, lighting designers, editors, video games and models. Usually 2 to 3 minutes in length and consisting of footage from different projects, a showreel typically supplements a résumé and is used to promote the person to talent agents, producers, and casting directors. A voice actor may create an audio-only showreel, a voice reel, for the same purpose.

Outside of the entertainment industry, companies use showreels for brand management and other forms of marketing communications and public relations, which in this case is called a corporate showreel. They are also used for public relations, advertising, or propaganda of various kinds.

== See also ==
- Artist's portfolio
- Media clip
