= List of CBBC presenters =

This is a list of notable CBBC and CBeebies presenters from when in-vision presentation was launched in September 1985.

== Presenters ==
=== CBBC ===
- Phillip Schofield
- Andy Crane
- Gordon the Gopher
- Tracy Brabin
- Anthea Turner
- Siobhan Maher Kennedy
- Colin Heywood
- Sue Devaney
- Edd the Duck
- Andi Peters
- Philippa Forrester
- Esther McVey
- Toby Anstis
- John Urquhart
- Di Christie
- Steve McKenna
- Zoe Ball
- Chris Jarvis
- Josie d'Arby
- Otis the Aardvark (Dave Chapman)
- Grant Stott
- Simeon Courtie
- Gail Porter
- Kirsten O'Brien
- Dominic Wood
- Richard McCourt
- Marsali Stewart
- Steve Wilson
- Ana Boulter
- Emlyn the Gremlyn
- Michael Underwood
- Adrian Dickson
- Angellica Bell
- Fearne Cotton
- Ortis Deley
- Kate Heavenor
- Jake Humphrey
- Andrew Hayden-Smith
- Sophie McDonnell
- Gemma Hunt
- Barney Harwood
- Anne Foy
- Matt Edmondson
- Rani Price
- Ed Petrie
- Oucho T. Cactus (Warrick Brownlow-Pike)
- Ciaran Joyce
- Holly Walsh
- Daniel Clarkson
- Sam Nixon
- Mark Rhodes
- Iain Stirling
- Hacker T Dog (Andy Heath; Phil Fletcher)
- London Hughes
- Chris Johnson
- Dodge T. Dog (Warrick Brownlow-Pike)
- Ben Hanlin
- Shannon Flynn
- Cel Spellman
- Katie Thistleton
- Karim Zeroual
- Lauren Layfield
- B1ink Bot 3 (Warrick Brownlow-Pike)
- Ben Shires
- Rhys Stephenson
- Max and Harvey
- Kia Pegg
- Millie Innes
- Joe Tasker

=== CBeebies ===
- Sue Monroe
- Chris Jarvis
- Pui Fan Lee
- Sidney Sloane
- Justin Fletcher
- Sarah-Jane Honeywell
- Sara Alexander
- Andy Day
- Alex Winters
- Cerrie Burnell
- Katy Ashworth
- Cat Sandion
- Dodge T. Dog (Warrick Brownlow-Pike)
- Maddie Moate
- George Webster
