= Sam & Mark's Big Friday Wind-Up =

British children's television series

- Titlecard from Series 1 onwards
- Starring: Sam Nixon; Mark Rhodes
- Theme music composer: Guy Rowland
- Opening theme: "Jerk It Out" by Caesars
- Country of origin: United Kingdom
- No. of series: 8
- No. of episodes: 86

Production
- Producers: Luke Boatright; Larissa Watson
- Production locations: BBC Television Centre (Series 1) dock10 studios (Series 2-8)
- Camera setup: Multiple
- Running time: 60 minutes

Original release
- Network: CBBC
- Release: 16 September 2011 – 5 April 2019

Related
- Sam & Mark's TMi Friday

Sam & Mark's Big Friday Wind-Up (also called Sam & Mark's Big Wind-Up for repeat compilations featuring just the pranks and Sam & Mark's Big Christmas Wind-Up for Christmas specials) is a British children's entertainment series aired on the CBBC Channel since 16 September 2011. It is presented by Sam & Mark. It is effectively the replacement for TMi (later known as Sam & Mark's TMi Friday). A fifth series started airing from 18 December 2015, and a sixth series began airing from 16 December 2016 and finished on 31 March 2017. A seventh series began airing in January 2018.

== Format ==
Each episode begins with Sam & Mark speaking to children in the audience who are said to have an embarrassing member of their family. They happen to bring out one of the audience member's mother/father and get them to do their embarrassing feat. They allow their children to get back at them by playing a game called 'Mum/Dad on a Wheel' which has been recently changed to 'Mum/Dad Pin Bowling'.

Another segment is 'In Yer House' which involves Sam & Mark having to put on a disguise and play-act towards a certain child/victim without being seen, and once they are, they are 'rumbled'. There are four rounds to this game.

== Episodes ==
=== Series 1 (2011) ===
| Episode no. | Airdate | Celebrity guest(s) |
|---|---|---|
| 1 | 16 September 2011 | Sugababes |
| 2 | 23 September 2011 | Joe McElderry and Six D |
| 3 | 30 September 2011 | Joe Swash and Nicola Roberts |
| 4 | 7 October 2011 | Loick Essien |
| 5 | 14 October 2011 | Stacey Solomon and Rizzle Kicks |
| 6 | 21 October 2011 | |
| 7 | 28 October 2011 | The Wanted |
| 8 | 4 November 2011 | Daniel Anthony and Cover Drive |
| 9 | 11 November 2011 | Pixie Lott |
| 10 | 18 November 2011 | The Saturdays |
| 11 | 25 November 2011 | Joe McElderry and Six D |
| 12 | 2 December 2011 | Oh My! |
| 13 | 9 December 2011 | Parade |

=== Series 2 (2013) ===
| Episode no. | Airdate | Celebrity guest(s) |
|---|---|---|
| 1 | 11 January 2013 | Lawson |
| 2 | 18 January 2013 | Amelia Lily |
| 3 | 25 January 2013 | JLS and Scouting for Girls |
| 4 | 1 February 2013 | One Direction and Lemar |
| 5 | 8 February 2013 | A*M*E and Hacker T. Dog |
| 6 | 15 February 2013 | Conor Maynard and Flawless |
| 7 | 22 February 2013 | Lilygreen & Maguire |
| 8 | 1 March 2013 | The Mend |
| 9 | 8 March 2013 | Tyler James |

=== Series 3 (2014) ===
| Episode no. | Airdate | Celebrity guest(s) |
|---|---|---|
| 1 | 17 January 2014 | Akai Osei and Lucy Spraggan |
| 2 | 24 January 2014 | Union J, Jack Carroll and Elyar Fox |
| 3 | 31 January 2014 | Bobby Lockwood and Loveable Rogues |
| 4 | 7 February 2014 | The Vamps and Chris Johnson |
| 5 | 14 February 2014 | The Struts |
| 6 | 21 February 2014 | Jessie J, Maisie Smith and Young Kato |
| 7 | 28 February 2014 | The Luminites and Ceallach Spellman |
| 8 | 7 March 2014 | Matt Cardle and Richard & Adam |
| 9 | 14 March 2014 | Tich and Lawson |
| 10 | 28 March 2014 | Compilation episode |

=== Series 4 (2014-15) ===
Episode 1 was a Christmas special which aired over 1 month before the start of the main series (episodes 2 - 11)

| Episode no. | Airdate | Celebrity guest(s) |
|---|---|---|
| 1 | 15 December 2014 | Union J and The Vamps |
| 2 | 23 January 2015 | Union J, Jedward and Harvey |
| 3 | 30 January 2015 | Rough Copy, Cel Spellman, Andrew Whyment and Sam Aston |
| 4 | 6 February 2015 | Ward Thomas and Rachel Riley |
| 5 | 13 February 2015 | Bars and Melody and Zoella |
| 6 | 20 February 2015 | Magalie Vae |
| 7 | 27 February 2015 | Ed Petrie and Overload Generation |
| 8 | 6 March 2015 | Jermain Jackman |
| 9 | 13 March 2015 | Compilation episode |
| 10 | 20 March 2015 | Compilation episode |
| 11 | 27 March 2015 | Compilation episode |

=== Series 5 (2015-16) ===
Like the last series, episode 1 was a Christmas special which aired just under 1 month before the start of the main series (episodes 2 - 11)

| Episode no. | Airdate | Celebrity guest(s) |
|---|---|---|
| 1 | 18 December 2015 | The Overtones, Chris Johnson, Akai Osei, Leona Vaughan and Amy-Leigh Hickman |
| 2 | 15 January 2016 | The Vamps and Peter Andre |
| 3 | 22 January 2016 | Joe Swash |
| 4 | 30 January 2016 | Nathan Sykes |
| 5 | 5 February 2016 | Jennie McAlpine, Ted Robbins and Ian Kirkby |
| 6 | 12 February 2016 | Naomi Wilkinson |
| 7 | 19 February 2016 | Bars and Melody and Lauren Layfield |
| 8 | 26 February 2016 | Kimberly Wyatt |
| 9 | 4 March 2016 | Ed Petrie and Shannon Flynn |
| 10 | 11 March 2016 | Lindsey Russell and Ben Shires |
| 11 | 18 March 2016 | Compilation episode |

=== Series 6 (2016-17) ===
Like the last two series, series 6 began with a Christmas episode in December followed by the rest of the series in January.

| Episode no. | Airdate | Celebrity guest(s) |
|---|---|---|
| 1 | 16 December 2016 | Hacker T. Dog and The Vamps |
| 2 | 27 January 2017 | Tom Fletcher, Lauren Layfield, Katie Thistleton and Ward Thomas |
| 3 | 3 February 2017 | Amy-Leigh Hickman, Jessica Revell and Union J |
| 4 | 10 February 2017 | Daniel Brocklebank, Iain Stirling, Katharine Merry, Kelly Gallagher and The Tide |
| 5 | 17 February 2017 | Matilda Ramsay and Gavin James |
| 6 | 24 February 2017 | Nikki Bella, Joe and Jake and Johnny & Inel |
| 7 | 3 March 2017 | Kevin Simm and Fergus Flanagan |
| 8 | 10 March 2017 | Hacker T. Dog, Simeon Qsyea, Jedward, Bec Hill and Ben Haenow |
| 9 | 17 March 2017 | Leona Vaughan, Dolly-Rose Campbell and Collabro |
| 10 | 24 March 2017 | Beth Tweddle, Nile Wilson and Bars and Melody |
| 11 | 31 March 2017 | Compilation show |

=== Series 7 (2018) ===
This series is the first since series 3 to not feature a Christmas special, instead there is an extra regular episode.

| Episode no. | Airdate | Celebrity guest(s) |
|---|---|---|
| 1 | 5 January 2018 | Isabel Clifton, Polly Allen and Yes Lad |
| 2 | 12 January 2018 | Cel Spellman, Lindsey Russell, Karim Zeroual and Matt Terry |
| 3 | 19 January 2018 | Katie Thistleton and Callum Beattie |
| 4 | 26 January 2018 | Jonny Nelson, Yasmin Evans, Ed Petrie and Naomi Wilkinson |
| 5 | 2 February 2018 | |
| 6 | 9 February 2018 | |
| 7 | 16 February 2018 | |
| 8 | 23 February 2018 | |
| 9 | 2 March 2018 | |
| 10 | 9 March 2018 | |

=== Series 8 (2019) ===
Like the last 3 series, series 8 began with a Christmas episode in December followed by the rest of the series in January.

| Episode no. | Airdate | Celebrity guest(s) |
|---|---|---|
| 1 | 25 January 2019 | |
| 2 | 1 February 2019 | |
| 3 | 8 February 2019 | |
| 4 | 15 February 2019 | |
| 5 | 22 February 2019 | |
| 6 | 1 March 2019 | |
| 7 | 8 March 2019 | |
| 8 | 15 March 2019 | |
| 9 | 22 March 2019 | |
| 10 | 29 March 2019 | |
| 11 | 5 April 2019 | |

== Accolades ==
Sam & Mark's Big Friday Wind-Up has been nominated for 6 British Academy Children's Awards and won three. It won twice for Best Presenter in 2013 and 2015 and won Best Entertainment in 2016.
