= Hacker's Olympic Rundown =

- Genre: Comedy; Sports
- Written by: Jaime Wilson; Graham Davies
- Presented by: Hacker T. Dog
- Starring: Phil Fletcher
- Country of origin: United Kingdom
- Original language: English
- No. of series: 1
- No. of episodes: 11

Production
- Running time: 5 minutes
- Production company: CBBC Productions

Original release
- Network: CBBC
- Release: 8 August – 22 August 2016

Hacker's Olympic Rundown is a British comedy-sports miniseries which aired on CBBC during the 2016 Summer Olympics in Rio de Janeiro. Presented by Scoop character, Hacker T. Dog, each episode features a rundown of the previous day's events with a humorous twist on them. Characters from Hacker Time, Wilf Breadbin and Derek McGee appeared as Hacker's 'roving reporter' and studio crew respectively. The series began on 8 August 2016. 11 episodes aired throughout August. All roles were portrayed by Phil Fletcher and were written by Jaime Wilson and Graham Davies.

== Format ==
Each episode features Hacker T. Dog (Phil Fletcher) as he covers a variety of sports in a comedic fashion, making fun of what was going on. Similar to Harry Hill's TV Burp. He also talked to his 'roving reporter' Wilfred Breadbin (also portrayed by Fletcher) who reported on something that had little to no relation to sports. Crew member Derek McGee (also portrayed by Fletcher) would help Hacker with presenting.

== Episodes ==
No.	Title	Original release date
1	"Episode 1"	8 August 2016
Events covered: Opening ceremony; Men's swimming; Women's swimming; Men's fencing; Men's water polo
2	"Episode 2"	9 August 2016
Events covered: Women's equestrian; Men's tennis; Men's swimming; Men's diving; Women's judo; Men's gymnastics; Women's tennis; Men's rowing; Men's equestrian
3	"Episode 3"	10 August 2016
Events covered: Men's swimming; Men's boxing; Women's swimming; Women's diving; Women's gymnastics; Men's equestrian; Women's equestrian; Men's field hockey
4	"Episode 4"	11 August 2016
Events covered: Men's canoeing; Men's cycling; Men's diving; Men's shooting; Women's judo
5	"Episode 5"	12 August 2016
Events covered: Women's gymnastics; Men's cycling; Women's rowing; Men's rugby sevens; Men's canoeing
