= Hacker T Dog =

Puppet-dog television presenter

- Scoop, CBBC, Hacker Time and Blue Peter character
- First appearance: Scoop (2009)
- Created by: Neil Sterenberg
- Portrayed by: Andy Heath (2009); Phil Fletcher (2009–present)

In-universe information
- Species: Border Terrier
- Gender: Male
- Occupation: Presenter
- Nationality: British
- Owner: Digby Digworth (Scoop)

Hacker The Dog, more commonly known as Hacker T Dog, is a Border Terrier dog puppet who appears on the CBBC television channel in the United Kingdom. He is performed by puppeteer Phil Fletcher.

== Development and history ==
Hacker was introduced as a character in the CBBC television programme Scoop, performed by Andy Heath. Hacker is the unintelligible non-spoken sidekick of Digby Digworth, as the two attempt to try and find a news scoop but chaos ensues along the way.

After the character became popular, Hacker was added as a weekday presenter at the CBBC office in May 2009, with the puppetry and voice now being performed by Phil Fletcher. He began presenting on weekdays with Scottish comedian Iain Stirling. Hacker from that point acquired a more distinctive character, with a much more comedic and sarcastic personality, and he now spoke in full words. These attributes featured in the second and third seasons of Scoop as well.

In 2010, Hacker's "half-brother" Dodge T Dog joined the presenting team on CBBC, while Hacker went off to film the second series of Scoop.

In 2011, Hacker was given a solo presenting role on a separate chat show titled Hacker Time, where he interviews television personalities and other CBBC stars. The series lasted six seasons from 2011 to 2016.

In 2013, following Iain Stirling's departure from CBBC, he and Dodge began presenting with Chris Johnson.

The character took a hiatus from CBBC in April 2014 to film Series 4 of Hacker Time. During his absence, numerous guest presenters filled in for him during his usual weekday afternoon slot. Hacker returned temporarily on 24 May 2014, before making a permanent return on 18 June 2014.

A 2016 clip in which Hacker deadpans to host Lauren Layfield "We're just normal men... We're just innocent men", prompting Layfield to break character and laugh while Hacker continues to deadpan, resurfaced in 2022 and went viral. While some assumed the clip had context before the exchange, Fletcher later explained that there was none, and he just ad-libbed the line to make Layfield laugh.

On 17 July 2025, it was announced that Hacker would become the forty-fourth presenter on Blue Peter beginning in September.

Hacker is very fond of television presenter Sue Barker and mentions her often. In 2009 Hacker was the mascot for the Wimbledon Championship.

Hacker is known for using the word "cocker", a casual term of address in the North of England.

== In other media ==
Hacker, Cel Spellman and Amberley Lobo provided CBBC commentary on the Russia v Belgium match at the 2014 FIFA World Cup.

Hacker appeared on an episode of Celebrity Mastermind in December 2016, his specialist subject being the Pet Shop Boys. He came in second place, losing to television chef Paul Rankin.

== Television ==
The character has appeared in the following roles:

Year	Title	Notes
2009–2011	Scoop	First appearance
2009–present	CBBC Office/CBBC HQ	Channel presenter
2011–2016	Hacker Time	Namesake presenter
2013, 2016	Sam & Mark's Big Friday Wind-Up	
2014	Wimbledon 2day	
2015	Wimbledon	
2015	Hacker's Birthday Bash: 30 Years of Children's BBC	Main role
2015–2017	The Dog Ate My Homework	5 appearances
2015–2017	All Over the Place	Appears in cutaway segments recorded in the UK
2016	Horrible Histories: Gory Games	Contestant
2016	Hacker's Olympic Rundown	Main role
2016	Celebrity Mastermind	Contestant; 2nd place
2016	Hacker's Crackers	Main role
2016	Zig and Zag's Zogcasts	Appears in episode 17
2016	Art Ninja	Appears in 4 episodes from series 2–5
2017	BBC Election Wrap	
2017–2019	Saturday Mash-Up!	Presenter
2018	Remotely Funny	Contestant
2020	Pointless Celebrities	Contestant; children's TV special
2020	Andy and the Band: Live at Home!	
2022	Andy and the Band	Appears in episode: "BBC Shutdown"
2024	Birthday Party in the CBeebies House	
2025	Blue Peter	Presenter

== See also ==
- Scoop
- Hacker Time
- Andy Heath (puppeteer)
- Phil Fletcher
- Warrick Brownlow-Pike
- Sue Barker
- List of CBBC presenters
- List of Blue Peter presenters
