= List of Dennis the Menace and Gnasher (2009 TV series) episodes =

The following is a list of episodes of the television series Dennis the Menace and Gnasher.

== Episodes ==
=== Series 1 (2009–2010) ===
The full list of episodes has been released: The series took a break between 7 October 2009 and 31 January 2010.

No. overall	No. in season	Title	Original release date
1	1	"The Way of Den-Do"	7 September 2009
3	2	"Smelling of Roses"	8 September 2009
2	3	"Curtains for Dennis"	9 September 2009
4	4	"Splash!"	10 September 2009
5	5	"The Mystery of the Missing Teapot"	11 September 2009
6	6	"Castle in the Air"	14 September 2009
7	7	"Aliens Among Us"	15 September 2009
8	8	"No Joke"	16 September 2009
9	9	"Dennis V.I.P"	17 September 2009
10	10	"Bad Dad"	18 September 2009
11	11	"Gnasher in Nappies"	21 September 2009
12	12	"Rubberbands and Paperclips"	22 September 2009
13	13	"Boot"	23 September 2009
14	14	"Breakout"	24 September 2009
15	15	"Eyes on the Prize"	25 September 2009
16	16	"Dance of the Seven Pies"	26 September 2009
17	17	"The Pond Monster"	27 September 2009
18	18	"Dennis' Thank-You's"	28 September 2009
19	19	"Fish Tale"	29 September 2009
20	20	"Masters of the House"	30 September 2009
21	21	"Game On"	1 October 2009
22	22	"All-in Menacing"	2 October 2009
23	23	"Attack of the Walterbot"	3 October 2009
24	24	"Great Outdoors"	4 October 2009
25	25	"No Pies for Pie Face"	5 October 2009
26	26	"Dog Tired"	6 October 2009
27	27	"Dig This"	1 February 2010
28	28	"The In Crowd"	2 February 2010
29	29	"First Aid Dennis"	3 February 2010
30	30	"Rock And A Hard Place"	4 February 2010
31	31	"Horsey Havoc"	5 February 2010
32	32	"Grounded"	6 February 2010
33	33	"Double Act"	7 February 2010
34	34	"The Curse of Madam Gigi"	8 February 2010
35	35	"Random Access Mayhem"	9 February 2010
36	36	"Treehouse Treason"	10 February 2010
37	37	"Menace and Co"	11 February 2010
38	38	"No Place Like Home"	12 February 2010
39	39	"Dennis Jumps the Line"	13 February 2010
40	40	"Operation Windbreaker"	14 February 2010
41	41	"Menace on the Mend"	15 February 2010
42	42	"Athena's Party"	16 February 2010
43	43	"Dennis' Hiccups"	17 February 2010
44	44	"Nanny State"	18 February 2010
45	45	"Mother's Day"	19 February 2010
46	46	"Run Rabbit Run"	20 February 2010
47	47	"Beanotown In Bloom"	21 February 2010
48	48	"Fangs for the Memories"	22 February 2010
49	49	"Curly's Collection"	23 February 2010
50	50	"Substitute Creecher"	24 February 2010
51	51	"Lost"	25 February 2010
52	52	"You're Joking"	26 February 2010

=== Series 2 (2013) ===
Series 2 has incorporated Dennis' newly designed parents from weekly comic The Beano. CBBC presenter Chris Johnson has taken on the voice role of Dennis the Menace. It was also noted that Dennis appears more menacing than in the previous series. Michael Stirling of DC Thomson had this say, "will be ABSOLUTELY more menacing…something which will become very clear to everyone when the series is officially publicised." This series was on temporary hiatus between 21 September 2013 and 19 November 2013.

No. overall	No. in season	Title	Original release date
53	1	"Dirty Deeds"	8 July 2013
54	2	"Last Day of Summer"	9 July 2013
55	3	"You and Whose Army"	10 July 2013
56	4	"Menace's Seven"	11 July 2013
57	5	"Dinmakers Go Ape"	12 July 2013
58	6	"The Ultimate Prank"	13 July 2013
59	7	"I'll Teach You"	14 July 2013
60	8	"Hairy Plotter"	15 July 2013
61	9	"Bring The Din"	16 July 2013
62	10	"The Exterminator"	17 July 2013
63	11	"The Gnashinator"	18 July 2013
64	12	"Sick As A Parrot"	19 July 2013
65	13	"Dennis's School Dinners"	26 July 2013
66	14	"Escape From Detention"	27 July 2013
67	15	"Come Menace With Me"	28 July 2013
68	16	"Leg Cuffed"	29 November 2013
69	17	"Piranharama"	30 December 2013
70	18	"Way of the Tiger"	31 July 2013
71	19	"Stunt Gran"	1 August 2013
72	20	"Just Desserts"	2 August 2013
73	21	"Couldn't Catch a Cold"	5 August 2013
74	22	"No Match for Dennis"	6 August 2013
75	23	"The Greatest Dog in the World"	7 August 2013
76	24	"Car Wash Caper"	8 August 2013
77	25	"Sausage Suspect"	9 August 2013
78	26	"Special Delivery"	18 November 2013
79	27	"Photo Finish"	19 November 2013
80	28	"The Way the Cookie Crumbles"	20 November 2013
81	29	"Menace Camp"	21 November 2013
82	30	"Sw...itched"	22 November 2013
83	31	"Constable Menace"	25 November 2013
84	32	"The Book of the Menace"	26 November 2013
85	33	"I Fought the Lawn"	27 November 2013
86	34	"Menace Swap"	28 November 2013
87	35	"Pie Protectors"	29 November 2013
88	36	"Curse of the Menace"	2 December 2013
89	37	"The Omega Menace"	3 December 2013
90	38	"The Daily Menace"	4 December 2013
91	39	"Bone Free Zone"	5 December 2013
92	40	"Bona Fide Genius"	6 December 2013
93	41	"The Mayor Affair"	9 September 2013
94	42	"The Show Mustn't Go On"	10 September 2013
95	43	"The WalterSlide"	11 September 2013
96	44	"Prom Mean"	12 September 2013
97	45	"Beanotown 5000"	13 September 2013
98	46	"Doggy Daycare"	16 September 2013
99	47	"Pranks for the Memories"	17 September 2013
100	48	"Itchin' for Gnasher"	18 September 2013
101	49	"Triathlon Trouble"	19 September 2013
102	50	"Perfect Prefect"	20 September 2013
103	51	"Late for School"	19 December 2013
104	52	"Tank You Very Much"	20 December 2013

=== 60 Second Dennis (2015-2017) ===
35 shorts were also made and air on CBBC. 60 Second Dennis is also the name of a former strip in The Beano.

- "Time Machine" (30 November 2015)
- "Dogs Dinner" (6 December 2015)
- "Costume Drama" (3 January 2016)
- "Fore" (8 January 2016)
- "Machine Menace Mayhem" (19 February 2016)
- "Pie Face Off" (25 November 2016)
- "Wax Work Dummy" (2 January 2017)
- "Dry As A Bone" (3 January 2017)
- "Ice Cream Mogul" (19 February 2017)
