= Hacker Time =

British children's TV series (2011–2016)

- Genre: Children's sketch talk show
- Created by: CBBC
- Presented by: Hacker T Dog
- Opening theme: a modified and truncated version of U Can't Touch This
- Composer: Guy Rowland
- Country of origin: United Kingdom
- Original language: English
- No. of series: 6
- No. of episodes: 63

Production
- Executive producer: Annette Williams
- Producer: Sid Cole
- Camera setup: Video, multiple-camera setup
- Running time: 30 minutes
- Production company: BBC In-House Children's Production

Original release
- Network: CBBC
- Release: 21 September 2011 – 19 August 2016

Hacker Time is a British children's sketch comedy talk show, broadcast by CBBC, starring Hacker T Dog. In each episode, Hacker interviews a celebrity, and plays games and the show also includes recurring segments, such as sketches. Six series of the show were produced, which were aired from 2011 to 2016.

== Production ==
Series 1 of Hacker Time was filmed in 2011 at BBC Television Centre in studio TC9, which was decommissioned shortly after production finished. Subsequent series were filmed at MediaCityUK.

In December 2014 it was announced that there would be a fifth series, consisting of ten episodes. It started on 27 July 2015 at 9:00am.

The final episode aired on 19 August 2016. In 2017, it was confirmed that the show had been cancelled and would not return for a seventh series that year. Reruns stopped airing in 2018 and the show has not been available on BBC iPlayer since then.

== Episodes ==
Series	Episodes	Originally released	
Series	Episodes	First released	Last released
1	13	21 September 2011	16 December 2011
2	10	6 August 2012	17 August 2012
3	10	22 July 2013	2 August 2013
4	10	11 August 2014	22 August 2014
5	10	27 July 2015	7 August 2015
6	10	8 August 2016	19 August 2016

=== Series 1 (2011) ===
No. overall	No. in series	Title	Original release date	UK viewers (millions)
1	1	"Anton Du Beke"	21 September 2011	N/A
Hacker explores the world of dance, tricking Anton Du Beke into being his studio guest and challenging the Strictly star to a dance-off.
2	2	"Dani Harmer"	28 September 2011	0.32
Hacker tries to break into the acting world and tricks CBBC's Dani Harmer into being a studio guest. Plus a return trip to Downstairs Abbey.
3	3	"Danny Anthony and Anjli Mohindra"	5 October 2011	N/A
Hacker gives us his unique take on aliens from galaxies far away and tricks Danny Anthony and Anjli Mohindra from The Sarah Jane Adventures into the studio. Plus we return to Downstairs Abbey.
4	4	"Steve Backshall"	12 October 2011	N/A
Hacker offers his unique take on animal programmes and tricks 'Deadly' Steve Backshall into the studio. Plus, a trip back to Downstairs Abbey.
5	5	"Carol Kirkwood"	19 October 2011	N/A
Hacker presents his unique take on the world's weather and tricks Carol Kirkwood from BBC Weather into the studio. Plus, a visit to the Dogs in Space.
6	6	"Ore Oduba"	26 October 2011	N/A
Hacker shares his unique take on sports and tricks CBBC's Ore Oduba, from Sportsround, into the studio. Plus another visit to the Dogs in Space.
7	7	"Pollyanna Woodward"	2 November 2011	N/A
Hacker shares his unique take on the world's best gadgets, and tricks Pollyanna Woodward from The Gadget Show into the studio to stay with his wacky new invention. Plus a return trip to Downstairs Abbey.
8	8	"JK and Joel"	9 November 2011	N/A
Hacker introduces viewers to the world of double acts, and fools Hider in the House duo Jason King and Joel Ross into the studio. With comedy guests and outtakes from other programmes, plus another trip to the hysterically historical Downstairs Abbey.
9	9	"Stefan Gates"	16 November 2011	N/A
Hacker explores the tasty world of food. He cooks up trouble when he invites Gastronuts presenter Stefan Gates into the studio. Plus a trip to see those Dogs in Space.
10	10	"Bill Turnbull and Sian Williams"	23 November 2011	N/A
Hacker tricks BBC Breakfast presenters Bill Turnbull and Sian Williams into appearing on his own new programme idea, Dog's Breakfast. Plus a visit to the Dogs in Space.
11	11	"Jedward"	30 November 2011	N/A
Hacker attracts Jedward into the studio. Plus some great Jedward mess-ups and a trip to Downstairs Abbey.
12	12	"Helen Skelton"	11 December 2011	N/A
Hacker shares his unique take on television adventurers. He tricks Blue Peter's Helen Skelton into the studio to see if she knows as much as him. Featuring a return to those Dogs in Space.
13	13	"Iain Stirling"	16 December 2011	N/A
In the last of the series, Hacker tries to trick a huge teenage heartthrob into the studio. It goes horribly wrong, and CBBC's Iain Stirling has his part to play in it!

=== Series 2 (2012) ===
No. overall	No. in series	Title	Original release date	UK viewers (millions)
14	1	"Dick and Dom"	6 August 2012	N/A
This time Dick and Dom are Hacker's special guests. Amongst the inevitable chaos, mayhem and gunge, there's Hacker's new crime serial Sherlock Bones, and many funny clips.
15	2	"Sue Barker"	7 August 2012	N/A
Hacker T. Dog is joined by the Queen of Sport, Sue Barker in a sport-tastic Hacker Time. Also featuring new crime drama, Sherlock Bones, a dancing lemon and Hacker's pick of the funniest Howlers from around the world.
16	3	"Naomi Wilkinson"	8 August 2012	N/A
Naomi Wilkinson is tricked on to the set to prove that she's neither Deadly nor 60! Hacker also finds out exactly how much Naomi knows about animal poo.
17	4	"Barney Harwood"	9 August 2012	N/A
Blue Peter bloke Barney Harwood finds himself on Hacker's chat show. He's used to appearing on TV, but Hacker Time is not like any other TV show... Also features a cameo appearance from Harwood's Bear Behaving Badly co-star Nev the Bear.
18	5	"Gerran Howell and Clare Thomas"	10 August 2012	N/A
Young Dracula actors Gerran Howell (Vlad) and Clare Thomas (Ingrid) are spooktacularly tricked into the Hacker Time studio... Prepare to be scared.
19	6	"Jennie McAlpine"	13 August 2012	N/A
Hacker is fizzing over with excitement when he secures top drawer Coronation Street star Jennie McAlpine to appear on his show. There'll be acting LOLs, another ridiculous song - and doggy detective Sherlock Bones.
20	7	"Ed Petrie"	14 August 2012	N/A
Ed Petrie feels All Over the Place when Hacker T Dog tricks him into appearing as a guest on his tiny, tiny little TV show. Ed's used to appearing on CBBC, but Hacker Time is not like any other TV show he's done.
21	8	"Connor Byrne and Kay Purcell"	15 August 2012	N/A
Hacker will be causing more trouble than Tracy Beaker - when he tricks Connor Byrne and Kay Purcell (aka Mike and Gina) from Tracy Beaker Returns into appearing on his show.
22	9	"Ricky Boleto"	16 August 2012	N/A
News just in! Ricky Boleto has been inadvertently tricked in to appearing on Hacker Time! Expect news-based chaos! Bong!
23	10	"Ceallach Spellman"	17 August 2012	N/A
Ceallach Spellman from Friday Download gets uploaded into the studio. Also featuring Hacker's new crime serial Sherlock Bones, and many funny clips.

=== Series 3 (2013) ===
No. overall	No. in series	Title	Original release date	UK viewers (millions)
24	1	"Sam and Mark"	22 July 2013	
Hacker is back with his own unique brand of top line entertainment - games, music, and comedy, all with a canine twist. Hacker tries to wind up his special guests, Sam and Mark.
25	2	"Susanna Reid"	23 July 2013	
More top notch comedy from Hacker, plus the hard hitting medical docu-drama, Casually. Hacker hones his interviewing skills with BBC Breakfast's Susanna Reid.
26	3	"Joe Pasquale"	24 July 2013	
More chaotic canine comedy capers from Hacker and his production team, plus there is a familiar face in Quarter Past 4 O'Clock Club. His guest is Joe Pasquale.
27	4	"Saira Khan"	25 July 2013	
Hacker and his rather woolly team attempt to keep another show on air. But don't worry, if Hacker Time falls apart then Derek Time is always on standby. Hacker's guest is business guru Saira Khan.
28	5	"Robbie Savage"	26 July 2013	
More top line entertainment from the pooch with pedigree, including the tension-fuelled game of strategy, What's In 'Em?. Hacker tackles Robbie Savage with some football banter.
29	6	"Khalil and Jason"	29 July 2013	
More comedy capers from our pedigree pooch, plus top dollar drama from the folk of Cockers' Creek. Hacker's guests are Khalil Madovi and Jason Callender from 4 O'Clock Club.
30	7	"Matt Allwright"	30 July 2013	
More entertainment from Hacker T. Dog and his rather unique production team. Comedy, music, and games, plus Watchdog's very own Matt Allwright as he's never been seen before.
31	8	"Fran Scott"	31 July 2013	
More canine comedy capers from the host who's barely house trained. Hacker's inventive skills are really put to the test, as his guest is scientist Fran Scott from Absolute Genius with Dick and Dom.
32	9	"Andrew Whyment"	1 August 2013	
More flea-bitten fun from the legendary four-legged friend. Hacker's guest is actor Andrew Whyment. But he ends up in a lather after meeting Accordion George.
33	10	"Shannon Flynn"	2 August 2013	
Hacker goes out on a howling high note in the final show of the series. His guest is Friday Download's very own Shannon Flynn, plus a cameo appearance from Alesha Dixon.

=== Series 4 (2014) ===
No. overall	No. in series	Title	Original release date	UK viewers (millions)
34	1	"Bobby Lockwood"	11 August 2014	
Chat, music and comedy from Hacker T. Dog, all with a canine curveball. In this episode, Hacker tries to outfox Wolfblood's Bobby Lockwood.
35	2	"Perri and Jordan"	12 August 2014	
More chat, music and comedy from Hacker T. Dog, plus the historical drama A Knight's Tail. Will our magical mutt also have the right moves to impress Perri Kiely and Jordan Banjo from Diversity?
36	3	"Deborah Meaden"	13 August 2014	
Chat, music and comedy from Hacker T. Dog and another tune from Quarter Past Four O'Clock Club. Also, Hacker hopes Dragons' Den star Deborah Meaden will invest her time and effort in his flea-ridden ideas.
37	4	"Ben Shires"	14 August 2014	
Hacker tries to keep another show on air. Also Wilf and Herman attempt to present in the Opinion Parlour. His guest is the Officially Amazing Ben Shires.
38	5	"Martin Lewis"	15 August 2014	
Chat, music and comedy from Hacker T Dog. Also featuring the lift-based quiz that works on many levels. In this episode, Hacker's guest is financial guru Martin Lewis.
39	6	"Simon Rimmer"	18 August 2014	
Comedy capers from Hacker T Dog, as well as the start of his top flight documentary, Aeroport. Also, has Hacker bitten off more than he can chew with TV chef Simon Rimmer?
40	7	"Radzi and Lindsey"	19 August 2014	
More flea-bitten fun, chat and music from Hacker T. Dog, but what will he make of Blue Peter presenters Radzi Chinyanganya and Lindsey Russell?
42	8	"Maisie Smith"	20 August 2014	
Fun, chat and music with a cockney twist as Hacker's guest is EastEnders star Maisie Smith. Will he win her over or will she be on the dog and bone to her agent?
42	9	"Sally Nugent"	21 August 2014	
Fun, chat and music from Hacker T. Dog, plus another uninvited appearance from Derek's mother. His guest is BBC Breakfast's Sally Nugent. She loves sport. He does not. What could possibly go right?
43	10	"Ortis Deley"	22 August 2014	
Fun, chat and music from Hacker T. Dog, featuring a trip to the future inspired by this episode's guest, Ortis Deley from The Gadget Show. Is the future clad in silver foil? It is just one of the pooch's many predictions!

=== Series 5 (2015) ===
No. overall	No. in series	Title	Original release date	UK viewers (millions)
44	1	"Kia Pegg and Amy-Leigh Hickman"	27 July 2015	
Fun, chat and music from Hacker T. Dog, featuring actresses Kia Pegg and Amy-Leigh Hickman.
45	2	"Dr Maggie Aderin-Pocock"	28 July 2015	
Fun, chat and music from Hacker T. Dog, featuring The Sky at Night and Stargazing Live presenter Dr Maggie Aderin-Pocock.
46	3	"Millie & Jeremy"	29 July 2015	
Fun, chat and music from Hacker T. Dog, featuring Millie Inbetween actors Millie Innes and Jeremy Edwards.
47	4	"Rav Wilding"	30 July 2015	
Fun, chat and music from Hacker T. Dog, featuring Hero Squad and Crimewatch presenter Rav Wilding.
48	5	"Kevin Clifton"	31 July 2015	
Fun, chat and music from Hacker T. Dog, featuring Strictly Come Dancing's professional dancer Kevin Clifton as Hacker's special guest.
49	6	"Chris van Tulleken and Xand van Tulleken"	3 August 2015	
Fun, chat and music from Hacker T. Dog, featuring Operation Ouch! presenters Dr. Chris and Dr. Xand van Tulleken.
50	7	"Ellie Simmonds"	4 August 2015	
Fun, chat and music from Hacker T. Dog, featuring sketches The Next Step but One and Quarter Past 4 O'Clock Club. Hacker's special guest is gold medal-winning Paralympian Ellie Simmonds.
51	8	"Tim Warwood"	5 August 2015	
Fun, chat and music from Hacker T Dog. Hacker's special guest is CBBC's Tim Warwood.
52	9	"Sonia"	6 August 2015	
Featuring sketches via The Next Step but One and Quarter Past 4 O'Clock Club. Hacker's special guest is 80s singer Sonia, star of the West End and Eurovision.
53	10	"Jay Rayner"	7 August 2015	
Fun, chat and music from Hacker T. Dog. His special guest is celebrity food critic and TV presenter Jay Rayner.

=== Series 6 (2016) ===
No. overall	No. in series	Title	Original release date	UK viewers (millions)
54	1	"Kimberly Wyatt"	8 August 2016	
Hacker interviews Taking The Next Step judge, Kimberly Wyatt.
55	2	"Leona Vaughan and Louis Payne"	9 August 2016	
Hacker interviews Wolfblood stars, Leona Vaughan and Louis Payne.
56	3	"Lauren Layfield"	10 August 2016	
Hacker interviews The Dengineers presenter, Lauren Layfield.
57	4	"Alison Hammond"	11 August 2016	
Hacker interviews ITV television personality and actress, Alison Hammond.
58	5	"Isabel Clifton and Matthew Ashforde"	12 August 2016	
Hacker interviews Hetty Feather stars, Isabel Clifton and Matthew Ashforde.
59	6	"Steph McGovern"	15 August 2016	
Hacker interviews BBC Breakfast and Pocket Money Pitch presenter, Steph McGovern.
60	7	"Michelle Hardwick"	16 August 2016	
Hacker interviews Emmerdale star, Michelle Hardwick.
61	8	"Luis Troyano"	17 August 2016	
Hacker interviews The Great British Bake Off contestant, Luis Troyano.
62	9	"Paul Martin"	18 August 2016	
Hacker interviews Flog It! presenter, Paul Martin.
63	10	"Ricky Martin"	19 August 2016	
Hacker interviews Art Ninja presenter, Ricky Martin.

== Segments ==
Each episode has a distinct format. At the start is a cold open featuring what goes wrong in the studio where the show takes place. There is then a title sequence. Often episodes feature an interview with a celebrity (usually a BBC star). The episodes consist of a fact file, a comedic chat about the star of the show, a fictional commercial break (in some episodes), a song, a specific themed segment (usually in the style of a soap opera), more chatting, a parody of the show the special guest stars in, and another sketch. In four series, the show's final sequence is a game, either 'What's In 'Em?' in series 3, 'Get Out!' in series 4, 'Sit on the Lav Lav and Answer My Questions' in series 5, and 'Beam My Guest' in series 6. The show ends a goodbye song, reminding viewers to tune in to the next edition.

In all of the episodes there are many segments. In series 1, one of the recurring extras are a parody of Downton Abbey called Downstairs Abbey starring Hacker T. Dog and Dodge T. Dog as maids and Ed Petrie as their master. It stars two maids (Hacker the Dog and Dodge the Dog) who are in love with Lord Percy (Ed Petrie) but to their dismay he is in love with another woman Lady Sarah (Isabel Fay). Whenever Lady Sarah comes to the Abbey, Lord Percy tries to do something nice for her involving the maids and it all goes disastrously wrong. Then Lord Percy asks the maids to clear up after him.

There is also the 'Betterer Arena' in which Hacker attempts to perform better than the celebrity/s at their profession, be it acting or sport and then fails spectacularly. This features Warrick Brownlow-Pike as various different assistants for Hacker.

In Series 2 of Hacker Time, The Adventures of Sherlock Bones (a parody of Sherlock Holmes) replaces Downstairs Abbey, in which Hacker goes around the land of Teapot solving mysteries, often making silly conclusions at the end of each episode. Each episode of Sherlock Bones is about 2–4 minutes long.

In Series 2, Derek, one of Hacker's assistants, shows a part of the episode called Derek Time in which he shows three clips, and when Hacker says no he threatens to show the viewers at home "the photograph".

In Series 3, The Adventures Of Sherlock Bones is replaced with the "hard hitting medical docu-drama", "Casually", a spoof of Casualty, in which all the doctors and nurses give the wrong treatment. "Tales of the Mild West" also appears, where Hacker becomes the mayor of an old western town.

In Series 4 the first 5 episodes featured "A Knight's Tale". The last 5 episodes contained "Areoport", a mockumentary set in an airport.

In Series 5 episode 1-5, there was "Ms Marbles Mysteries" (a parody of Miss Marple), where Ms Marbles (played by Hacker) finds many mysteries and solves them. In episodes 6-10 there is "The Next Step But One", a parody of The Next Step. This was replaced in subsequent series by "Lost and Found (And Lost Again)", a parody of The Next Step's spinoff show Lost and Found.
