= 12 Again =

British children's television programme

- Genre: Reality
- Presented by: Iain Stirling
- Theme music composer: Guy Rowland
- Country of origin: United Kingdom
- Original language: English
- No. of seasons: 3
- No. of episodes: 36

Production
- Executive producer: Annette Williams

Original release
- Network: CBBC
- Release: 13 February 2012 – 23 November 2013

12 Again is a show that premiered on CBBC on 13 February 2012. It is presented by Iain Stirling, and each episode is 30 minutes long. The show sees various celebrities talking about what their life was like at the age of 12, usually covering news stories, what they would gossip about, favourite television programmes, favourite music, their favourite celebrities and what they would have done differently if they were 12 again.

== Episodes ==
=== Series 1: 2012 ===
No. overall	No. in series	Title	Original release date
1	1	"Series 1, Episode 1"	13 February 2012
Special guests: Alexandra Burke, Jacqueline Wilson, Sam & Mark and One Direction
2	2	"Series 1, Episode 2"	14 February 2012
Special guests: Cher Lloyd, Craig Revel Horwood, Rav Wilding and Cover Drive
3	3	"Series 1, Episode 3"	15 February 2012
Special guests: Tom Daley, Alesha Dixon, Bill Turnbull and Ronan Parke
1	4	"Series 1, Episode 4"	16 February 2012
Special guests: Rizzle Kicks, Naomi Wilkinson, Frances Barber and Nicole Scherzinger
5	5	"Series 1, Episode 5"	17 February 2012
Special guests: Joe Swash, Anjli Mohindra, Ted Robbins and Richard Wisker
6	6	"Series 1, Episode 6"	7 May 2012
Special guests: Pixie Lott, Steve Backshall, Brian Blessed and JLS
7	7	"Series 1, Episode 7"	2 June 2012
Special guests: Tinchy Stryder, Dick and Dom, Deborah Meaden and Alex Jones
8	8	"Series 1, Episode 8"	3 June 2012
Special guests: Olly Murs, Sara Cox, Meera Syal and Matt Dawson
9	9	"Series 1, Episode 9"	4 June 2012
Special guests: Stacey Solomon, Barney Harwood, Mark Lawrenson and Wretch 32
10	10	"Series 1, Episode 10"	5 June 2012
Special guests: Dani Harmer, Sonali Shah, Alistair McGowan and Daniel Anthony
25	11	"Series 1, Episode 11"	6 June 2012
Special guests: Doc Brown, Gabby Logan, Theo Paphitis and Matt Cardle
12	12	"Series 1, Episode 12"	7 June 2012
Special guests: Charlie Simpson, Michael Vaughan, Michelle Collins and A*M*E
13	13	"Strictly Special"	8 June 2012
Special guests:Helen Skelton, Jon Culshaw, Bernard Cribbins and Mz Bratt

=== "End of Summer" special ===
On Monday 3 September 2012 at 5:45 pm, a brand new 12 Again special premiered, where many special celebrity guests revisit their favourite summer memories of when they were 12.

=== Series 2: 2012 ===
A second series of 12 Again began on Friday, 21 September 2012, at 5 pm, to run for 13 episodes.

No. overall	No. in series	Title	Original release date
15	1	"Series 2, Episode 1"	21 September 2012
Dionne Bromfield, Ed Petrie and John Humphrys revisit the music and TV shows they loved and the big news stories that happened when they were kids. Also, American Idol Adam Lambert talks about what he was like at 12. Special guests: Dionne Bromfield, Ed Petrie, John Humphrys and Adam Lambert
16	2	"Series 2, Episode 2"	28 September 2012
Young Dracula's Clare Thomas and Gerran Howell, Professor Green and Susanna Reid revisit the music and TV shows they loved and the big news stories that happened when they were kids. Also, girl band Stooshe look back at their 12-year-old selves. Special guests: Clare Thomas, Gerran Howell, Professor Green, Susanna Reid and Stooshe
17	3	"Series 2, Episode 3"	5 October 2012
Edith Bowman, Roll Deep and Newsround legend John Craven revisit the music and TV shows they loved and the big news stories that happened when they were kids. Also, American band Hot Chelle Rae reveal what they were like at 12. Special guests: Edith Bowman, Roll Deep, John Craven and Hot Chelle Rae
18	4	"Series 2, Episode 4"	12 October 2012
Antony Cotton, Winter Olympian Amy Williams and radio legend Tony Blackburn revisit the music and TV shows they loved and the big news stories that happened when they were kids. Also, R&B megastar Usher reveals what he was like at 12. Special guests: Antony Cotton, Amy Williams, Tony Blackburn and Usher
19	5	"Series 2, Episode 5"	19 October 2012
Conor Maynard, Ore Oduba and impressionist Debra Stephenson revisit the music and TV shows they loved and the big news stories that happened when they were kids. Also the Scissor Sisters reveal what they were like at 12. Special guests: Conor Maynard, Ore Oduba, Debra Stephenson and Scissor Sisters
20	6	"12 Again Spooky Special"	26 October 2012
A special Halloween edition of 12 Again, in which a host of top celebrities look back on their Halloween experiences when they were 12. What did they get dressed up as? What used to scare the pants off them on TV? And which spooky songs did they love? This special show celebrates the scariest, spookiest night of the year. Note: This episode is similar to the 'End of Summer' special, with various stars on the show. It is also technically Series 2, Episode 6.
21	7	"Series 2, Episode 7"	2 November 2012
Countdown's Rachel Riley, Ronan Keating, and rockers Gene Simmons and Paul Stanley from Kiss revisit the music and TV shows they loved - and the big news stories that happened - when they were 12. Plus Charlie from Lonsdale Boys Club reveals what he was like when he was a kid. Special guests: Rachel Riley, Ronan Keating, Gene Simmons, Paul Stanley and Lonsdale Boys Club's Charlie Weaver
22	8	"Series 2, Episode 8"	9 November 2012
Marcus Collins, Russell Watson, and Christine Bleakley revisit the music and TV shows they loved and the big news stories that happened when they were kids. Also, Alyssa Reid reveals what she was like when she was 12. Special guests: Marcus Collins, Russell Watson, Christine Bleakley and Alyssa Reid
23	9	"Series 2, Episode 9"	16 November 2012
Dominique Moore, "H" from Steps and TV legend Angela Rippon revisit the music and TV shows they loved and the big news stories that happened when they were kids. Also, pop band Lawson reveal what they were like when they were 12. Special guests: Dominique Moore, Ian "H" Watkins, Angela Rippon and Lawson
24	10	"Series 2, Episode 10"	23 November 2012
CBBC's Cel Spellman, Dan Walker from Football Focus and soap star Sally Dynevor revisit the music and TV shows they loved when they were 12, as well as the big news stories back then. And Little Mix reveal what life was like when they were 12. Special guests: Ceallach Spellman, Dan Walker, Sally Dynevor and Little Mix
25	11	"Series 2, Episode 11"	30 November 2012
Rita Ora, Chris Bisson and chef Simmon revisit the music and TV shows they loved when they were 12, as well as the big news stories back then. And kings of grime Clement Marfo and the Frontline reveal what life was like when they were 12 Special guests: Rita Ora, Chris Bisson, Simon Rimmer and Clement Marfo and the Frontline
26	12	"Strictly Special"	7 December 2012
A dance-tastic special edition of 12 Again, in which we tango back in time with the stars of Strictly Come Dancing. What were they like at school, what tunes did they jive along to, and which favourite TV shows got their toes tapping? Featuring Craig Revel-Horwood, Bruno Tonioli, James and Ola Jordan and many more. Note: This was similar to the previous Summer and Halloween specials, with a variety of guest stars, however they were all stars of Strictly Come Dancing.

=== Series 3: 2013 ===
No. overall	No. in series	Title	Original release date
27	1	"12 Again Comic Relief Special"	14 March 2013
Special guests: Tyger Drew-Honey, Shappi Khorsandi, Inel Tomlinson, Johnny Cochrane, Sam Nixon and Mark Rhodes
28	2	"School Days Special"	13 May 2013
Special guests: Helen Skelton, Sam Nixon, Mark Rhodes, Warwick Davis and Tyger Drew-Honey
29	3	"EastEnders"	20 May 2013
Special guests: Jo Joyner, Rudolph Walker and Nitin Ganatra
30	4	"Magicians Special"	27 May 2013
Special guests: Fergus Flanagan Stephen Mulhern, Ben Hanlin, Dominic Wood, Richard McCourt and Katherine Mills
31	5	"Music Special"	3 June 2013
Special guests: A*M*E, Bridgit Mendler, Nina Nesbitt, Kate Nash and Guy Garvey
32	6	"Friendship Special"	10 June 2013
Special guests: Kirstie Steele, Richard McCourt, Dominic Wood, Hayley Cutts, Ricky Boleto, Sam Nixon, Mark Rhodes, Barney Harwood, Ore Oduba, Guy Garvey, Dynamo, Helen Skelton and Warwick Davis
33	7	"Talent Show Stars"	17 June 2013
Special guests: Amelia Lily, Union J and Misha B
34	8	"Chefs Special"	1 July 2013
Special guests: Dave Myers, Simon King, Stefan Gates, Anjum Anand and Gizzi Erskine
35	9	"Sports Days Special"	8 July 2013
Special guests: Louis Smith, Sarah Storey, Fabrice Muamba, Iwan Thomas, Mark Rhodes, Nina Nesbitt, Warwick Davis and Helen Skelton
36	10	"Doctor Who Special"	23 November 2013
Special guests: Tommy Knight, Warwick Davis, Chris Johnson, Jon Culshaw, Neve McIntosh, Dan Starkey, Louise Jameson and Sylvester McCoy

== Topics covered ==
- Introduction
- What life was like for them in general when they were 12
- The music they liked when they were 12
- Their big moments/big news stories when they were 12
- What they watched on TV when they were 12
- What they would change if they were 12 again
