= Chris Johnson (presenter) =

British television presenter and actor

- Born: Christopher David Johnson; 25 January 1991 (age 35); England
- Other name: OfficialCDJ
- Occupations: Television presenter; actor
- Years active: 2007–present

Christopher David Johnson (often credited as Chris "Yonko" Johnson) (born 25 January 1991) is a British television presenter and actor. He began presenting on the CBBC Channel in January 2010, and continued until April 2016. His first television appearance was for BBC Three, introducing Family Guy. Chris also makes content on YouTube under the user name OfficialCDJ.

He voiced Dennis the Menace for the 2013 series Dennis the Menace and Gnasher.

== Early life ==
He attended Moorside High School in Swinton from 2002 to 2007 where he performed in a number of school musical productions. He then attended Pendleton College from 2007 to 2009, studying Performing Arts and Film Studies. Whilst there, Chris played a part in several shows, taking on the title role in an adaptation of The Picture of Dorian Gray as one example, as well as being involved in the college's first comedy review show. Adaptations of his YouTube sketches appeared in the review as video gags.

In the summer of 2007, he took part in the 'League of Locals' event, a live sketch show organised by the members of The League of Gentlemen's then-official website, This Is A Local Shop.

== Career ==
=== BBC Three ===
During his time at Pendleton, he submitted a short introduction video to BBC Three as part of their Be On TV campaign. Performing an impression of Stewie Griffin from Family Guy, Chris's video proved successful enough upon airing to encourage BBC Three to require him once more in a relaunch of the campaign, this time providing a trailer showing others how to submit their own videos. The ad ran from April to August in 2009 on BBC Three.

=== CBBC ===
In January 2010, Chris began presenting links on the CBBC Channel, the last of which being Shout Out Saturday with Shannon Flynn. Prior to this he presented weekday afternoons with Hacker the Dog, and has been teamed previously with Dodge T. Dog, Ed Petrie or London Hughes. During school holidays, Chris presented the live mornings, and was also the voice of CBBC on BBC One & BBC Two. As of early 2010, he also became the chief presenter of CBBC's red button service CBBC Extra.

When the BBC moved children's services to MediaCityUK Chris was the first presenter to appear onscreen in the brand new CBBC Office set. As of January 2013, Chris became the chief continuity presenter on the CBBC Channel. He is sometimes referred to by the other presenters and sidekicks as 'Yonko', amongst other strange nicknames.

As part of the CBBC line-up, Chris has been involved with tie-in events such as Red Nose Day 2011 for Comic Relief. He has also made cameos on Sam & Mark's TMi Friday, Sam & Mark's Big Friday Wind-Up and in the fourth episode of the third series of Little Howard's Big Question alongside Hacker, as well as presenting in the second series of All Over The Place with his former partner Ed Petrie. In 2011 he partook in the Formula 1 CBBC Alternative Commentary as well as the Euro 2012 Final CBBC Alternative Commentary. Since 2014, Johnson has narrated Whoops I Missed the Bus.

On 4 July 2014 Johnson announced that he would be leaving the CBBC Office continuity links as of 5 September that year. On the day itself it was announced that Chris would continue to appear as the recurring presenter for the Shout Out Saturday live slot.

Since 2016, Johnson has appeared on the CBBC panel show The Dog Ate My Homework a number of times across two series.

On 9 April 2016 Shout Out Saturday came to a close, and that morning Chris and Shannon Flynn announced it was their last ever day on the CBBC Channel continuity.

=== Dennis the Menace ===
Chris voiced Dennis the Menace from Season 2 onwards in the Dennis the Menace and Gnasher animated series, taking over from Sophie Aldred. The theme song was redone for the new version of the show, with Johnson providing vocals.

He also recorded a new series of 'Beanotown', as Dennis, for Fun Kids Radio, which was broadcast during the summer of 2013, with a second series broadcast in 2015. Chris provides the voice of Dennis and many other characters for most Beano tie-in projects, such as IOS games.

=== Doctor Who ===
Whilst working at CBBC, Chris took part in several Doctor Who & The Sarah Jane Adventures promotional events. As an open 'mega-fan' of both shows, he was the obvious choice for the sketches, which included a five-part crossover with the CBBC Office and the characters from The Sarah Jane Adventures, interviewing Amy Pond actress Karen Gillan for CBBC on the week of the launch of the new series of Doctor Who, and many other examples. He provided the voiceover for a CBBC exclusive trailer for the 2013 series.

In early 2011, Chris made his début as a member of the new Time Team feature for Doctor Who Magazine, and during that team's tenure they covered everything from the 2005 series' opener Rose, eventually ending unannounced in late 2017 with their piece about 2011's The Rebel Flesh/The Almost People. In 2018 the magazine relaunched the item with a different team, with no explanation given as to why the previous incarnation was concluded.

Chris also played several characters in the Doctor Who spin-off Gallifrey IV by Big Finish Productions, as well as appearing in the Bernice Summerfield story 'Private Enemy No.1' from the 'Epoch' series.

Chris appeared in the final episode of Doctor Who: The Adventure Games, 'The Gunpowder Plot', in the roles of 'Barnaby', plotter Robert Keyes and a royal guard.

In 2015, he appeared on the 'Doctor Who Comic Book Day' episode of Doctor Who: The Fan Show, as well as the review episode for The Magician's Apprentice.

=== Podcasting and other work ===
He appeared on an episode of Celebrity Mastermind in December 2012. In 2014 he appeared as 'Ken Kong' in an episode of Strange Hill High.

In 2014, he participated in several online audio series as a performer, including Timetunnel Media's 'Doctor Who: The Missing Adventures' as an Ice Warrior and in the role of companion Tim in the Aimless Wanderings audio plays.

From 2016 to 2024, Johnson produced and co-hosted #BigDamnCast, a pop-culture podcast with longtime friend and collaborator Matthew Watson. The entire run of the podcast and tie-in sketches has been archived to a dedicated YouTube channel.

To celebrate the ten year anniversary of the return of Doctor Who to television, Chris began a podcast series called '#9is10', which provides brand new episode commentaries for the entire 2005 run of the show, as well as extra interviews with guests, some of whom are personal friends. The entire run, which began in March 2015, can be found on the 'OfficialCDJ' YouTube page as a playlist.

A casual gamer, Johnson began a Twitch streaming service in 2015 where he plays indie and mainstream titles for the PS4 & PS5. In June 2021 he began scriptwriting and presenting a video game news show on YouTube called 'Games Vault', which was produced until November of the same year.

He collaborates often with the YouTube group FiveWhoFans, appearing in their videos from time to time. In August 2017, he became a main cast member.

In 2025, Johnson was a finalist in Squid Games with Terrance Hampshire, a pop culture, film, and television quiz show broadcast on Twitch.

== Filmography ==
=== Television ===
Year	Title	Role	Notes
2009	BBC Three's "Be On TV!" ads	Stewie Griffin impersonator	
2010–2016	CBBC Channel	Presenter, actor, voiceover artist	Continuity presenter for live and pre-recorded links and voiceovers. Presented weekends and holiday mornings from 2010 until 2013. Hosted weekday afternoons with Hacker T. Dog from January 2013 til September 2014. Hosted Shout Out Saturday on the channel alongside Shannon Flynn from September 2014 – April 2016
2010	Sam & Mark's TMI Friday	Himself	
2011	Little Howard's Big Question	Himself	
2012	All Over The Place	Himself	Multiple episodes in Series 2
2012–2013	12 Again	Himself	Featured in the 12 Again Specials
2012	Celebrity Mastermind	Himself	
2013, 2014, 2015	Sam & Mark's Big Friday Wind-Up	Himself	
2013	Pet School	Himself	
2013	Turbo Boost	Himself	
2013–2014	Blue Peter	Himself	Featured as a guest judge for the 2013 Doctor Who gadget competition.
2013	Dennis the Menace and Gnasher	Dennis the Menace; Postman; Pie Face's Dad; Mr Cheddar; Harley the Pig, etc.	Voiced Dennis the Menace and several other characters for the animated series, and across spin-off media
2013–2014	Cbeebies Bedtime Story	Himself	2 episodes
2014–2018	Whoops I Missed The Bus	Narrator	Narrated nearly every episode since Summer 2014
2014	Strange Hill High	Ken Kong	Episode: 'Ken Kong'
2014	DNN	Himself	
2014–2015	Hacker Time	Himself	Two episodes of Series 4, in the 'Aeroport!' sketches; cameo'd in the Tim Warwood episode of Series 5
2015	All Over The Place: Europe	Himself	Appeared in 13 of the 15 episodes
2015	Ultimate Brain	Himself	Series 2, Episode 1. Contestant alongside Ed Petrie & Iain Stirling
2016	All Over The Place: Europe, Part 2	Himself	Appeared in 13 of the 15 episodes
2016, 2017	The Dog Ate My Homework	Himself	Panelist in 3 episodes of Series 3 and 2 episodes of Series 4
2017	All Over The Place: Asia, Part 1	Himself	Appeared in numerous episodes
2017	The League Of Gentlemen	Local Protester	Appeared in the Anniversary Special 'Royston Vasey Mon Amour'
2018	All Over The Place: Asia, Part 2	Himself	Chris took over as main presenter from Ed Petrie for the India portion of the show.
2018	Sketchy Comedy	Various roles	Voiced several animated shorts in the 2018 episodes
2020–present	BBC Bitesize Daily	Himself	6 x episodes in 2020; 2 x episodes in 2021; 9 x episodes in 2022
2020	BBC Learning	Himself	Presenter of 6 x numeracy and literacy episodes
2023	Dog Squad	Joe the Designer	Episode: 'Mission: Catwalk'

=== Video games ===
Year	Title	Role	Notes
2011	Doctor Who: The Adventure Games	Barnaby; Robert Keyes; Royal Guard	Episode: 'The Gunpowder Plot'
2015	Dennis & Gnasher Adventures!	Dennis; Gnasher; Walter; etc.	iOS and Android game
2024	Total War: Warhammer III	Bruiser	'Omens of Destruction' DLC

=== Audio Productions ===
Year	Title	Role	Notes
2010	Gallifrey IV	Technician Hester; Kraylon	Episodes: 'Disassembled' & 'Annihilation'
2011	Bernice Summerfield: Epoch	Darion	Episode: 'Public Enemy No. 1'
2013–2015	Beanotown	Dennis the Menace	Fun Kids radio series
2014–present	Aimless Wanderings	Tim	Online audio series

=== Theatre and stage ===
Year	Title	Role	Notes
2007	The Picture of Dorian Gray	Dorian Gray	Kingsley Theatre
2008	The School for Scandal	Sir Peter Teazle	Kingsley Theatre
2008	Grease (musical)	Teen Angel	Eccleston Theatre
2009	Double Bill: The Real Inspector Hound & Black Comedy	Corpse; Colonel Melkett	Kingsley Theatre
2009	Beyond the Front Line	Ensemble	The Lowry
2014–2015	Cinderella	Buttons; Baron Hard-Up	The Harlington, 2014–2015 pantomime
2016–2017	Cinderella	Buttons	New Theatre Royal Lincoln, 2016–2017 pantomime
2017–2018	Aladdin	Cous Cous	New Theatre Royal Lincoln, 2017–2018 pantomime
2018	Alice in Wonderland	The White Rabbit; Tweedle Dum; voice of The Cheshire Cat	New Theatre Royal Lincoln, 2018 Family Theatre Show
2018–2019	Snow White and the Seven Dwarfs	Muddles; The Frog Prince (voice & puppeteer)	New Theatre Royal Lincoln, 2018–2019 pantomime
2019	The Wizard of Oz	The Cowardly Lion	New Theatre Royal Lincoln, 2019 Family Theatre Show
2019–2020	Robin Hood	Will Scarlet	New Theatre Royal Lincoln, 2019–2020 pantomime
2020	Panto Live: Cinderella	Buttons	Going Live TV, 2020 livestream pantomime
2021	Panto Live Presents 'Cinderella: Remastered'	Buttons	Going Live TV, 2021 Easter livestream pantomime
2021-2022	Beauty and the Beast	Professor Ivar Brainstorm	New Theatre Royal Lincoln, 2021–2022 pantomime
2022	The Jungle Book	Kaa; The Monkey King	New Theatre Royal Lincoln, 2020 Family Theatre Show (rescheduled to 2022 due to the COVID-19 outbreak)
2024-2025	Sleeping Beauty	Chris the Castle Clown	Middleton Arena (2024) and The Muni (2025), 2024-2025 pantomime
2025-2026	Aladdin	Silly Billy Bon Bon	Middleton Arena (2025) and The Muni (2026), 2025-2026 pantomime

=== Podcasts ===
Year	Title	Role	Notes
2016–2024	#BigDamnCast	Co-host	A pop-culture news and reviews podcast hosted by Matt Watson and Chris Johnson. Available weekly on iTunes and Spotify from 2016, the show re-branded as 'Big Damn: A Pop-Culture Podcast' in 2022, before concluding its run in 2024. The full archive is available to play on YouTube.
2019–2020	Out of the Broom Cupboard (#OOTBC)	Host	Johnson interviews previous and current hosts, actors, voice actors, presenters, backstage crew, puppeteers and more about their careers in and around CBBC. Episode featured such guests as Phil Fletcher, the second puppeteer behind Hacker T. Dog, comedian Iain Stirling, and Doctor Who showrunner Russell T. Davies. Episodes were released first on Patreon a week before being released on Spotify and ITunes.
2025	Review of Death - (SJA) Chris Johnson Interview	Guest	Chris 'Yonko' Johnson joined Billy on Review of Death for a Patreon exclusive episode, where they discussed The Sarah Jane Adventures and his time presenting from the iconic CBBC broom cupboard. During the interview, Johnson shared stories about Karen Gillan's first live TV appearance, an amusing encounter at Steven Moffat's house, and how CBBC responded to the passing of Elisabeth Sladen.
