= Dennis the Menace and Gnasher (2009 TV series) =

British animated series

- Series 1 logo.
- Genre: Animated; Comedy; Children's television
- Created by: David Law
- Written by: Thomas Duncan-Watt; Bruce Griffiths; Andrew Jones; Ciaran Murtagh; Richelle Wilder; Cleon Prineas; Dan Berlinka
- Directed by: Glenn Kirkpatrick
- Voices of: Sophie Aldred; Teresa Gallagher; Jo Wyatt; Rob Rackstraw; Bob Golding; Jane Ubrien; Sarah Aubrey; Keith Scott; Chris Johnson; Natif Ahmed; Morwenna Banks; Rasmus Hardiker
- Theme music composer: Iain Cook
- Opening theme: "Unstoppable", sung by Kyle Wood (series 1), Chris Johnson (series 2)
- Ending theme: "Unstoppable" (instrumental)
- Countries of origin: United Kingdom; Australia
- Original language: English
- No. of series: 2
- No. of episodes: 104 (list of episodes)

Production
- Executive producers: Donna Andrews; Ken Anderson; Tim Brooke-Hunt; Ben Gray; Jo Rooney
- Producers: Donna Andrews; Jane Schneider; Sueann Smith; Stu Connolly
- Running time: 11 minutes
- Production companies: Beano Productions; Red Kite Animation; Sticky Pictures

Original release
- Network: Nine Network (Australia); ABC3 (Australia); CBBC (UK); The Hub (United States)
- Release: 7 September 2009 – 20 December 2013

Related
- Dennis the Menace and Gnasher (1996–1998); Dennis & Gnasher: Unleashed! (2017–2021)

Dennis the Menace and Gnasher (originally known as Dennis and Gnasher in its first series) is an animated television series which was aired on CBBC. Based on the original comic strips from The Beano, it features the adventures of the rebellious schoolboy Dennis the Menace and his dog Gnasher. and commenced on 7 September 2009 and ended on 26 February 2010 after 52 episodes. A second series was started on 8 July 2013 on the CBBC Channel. It was preceded by Dennis and Gnasher which aired between 1996 and 1998.

== Production ==
In February 2008, The Guardian announced that Dennis the Menace and Gnasher would be receiving a politically correct makeover for the 21st century. Originally, media investment company Ludorum was to represent the Dennis and Gnasher brand on behalf of its owners DC Thomson. Ludorum's chief executive Rob Lawes had global ambitions for the new Dennis, whose television series had also been pre-sold to the Nine Network in Australia. A 39-second pitch pilot for the series had been produced in 2007, animated by Vladimir Nikitin at Studio Baestarts.

The show was a co-production between Red Kite Animation in Scotland and Sticky Pictures in Australia. Images of the characters and production were featured in The Beano's 70-year anniversary. Consisting of 52 11-minute segments, the animation was directed by Glenn Kirkpatrick with executive producers Donna Andrews (Sticky Pictures) and Ken Anderson (Red Kite Animation) and producers Jane Schneider (Sticky Pictures) and Sueann Smith (Red Kite). The new series featured the return of Dennis, Gnasher, Mum, Dad, Curly and Pie-Face, and also introduced Dennis' little sister Bea, as well as several original characters like Athena. The production shots also showed Dennis' treehouse with a more menacing design. Sophie Aldred, Teresa Gallagher, Jo Wyatt, Rob Rackstraw and Bob Golding were confirmed to be voice actors for the series, while Jane Ubrien, Sarah Aubrey and Keith Scott would provide voices for the series' Australian dub. The voices were recorded at The Soundhouse.

=== Changes ===
A number of changes were made to the original format compared to the comics and previous television series. As well as being updated and modernised, Dennis lost his catapult and peashooter and no longer deliberately causes trouble. In addition, Walter, Dennis's main rival, was made more masculine, removing elements like his pink-coloured pyjamas, a small poodle, effeminate voice and his friends being mainly girls. There were fears that Dennis could be seen as homophobic or at the least bullying Walter about his effeminacy. A Telegraph article claimed that the show had been toned down for reasons of "political correctness". However the producers have stated that "Dennis will not lose his sense of fun."

Cartoonist Lew Stringer has refuted on his blog the political correctness claims made by some areas of the media, especially the reports that Dennis will no longer use catapults and Gnasher will no longer bite people. Describing these claims as "another 'political correctness gone mad' myth embellished by the media", he has posted videos showing that the show has not been softened up to the extent that the media has reported. Despite, or possibly because, of these changes, the show was received positively by the mainstream audience and a small number of professional critics, and the show was a ratings winner on the CBBC Channel at launch.

For the production of Series 2, it was decided that the series would change yet again. "The Menace" returned to the title "Dennis the Menace and Gnasher", and his personality changed slightly in tribute to the classic comics. Dennis also retained his catapult and peashooter and uses them directly. The designs of Dennis' parents also changed to match up to the weekly Beano comic. The series was produced in Flash animation instead of traditional animation. Voices were recorded at Tamborine Productions and provided by Chris Johnson, Natif Ahmed, Morwenna Banks and Rasmus Hardiker. Sophie Aldred stated that she was replaced with Johnson for the role of Dennis because the BBC wanted Dennis to have an older-sounding voice to attract an older audience.

== Characters ==
- Dennis: A mischievous 10-year-old boy, who loves pranking people. Voiced by Sophie Aldred (Series 1); Chris Johnson (Series 2); Jane Ubrien (Australia).
- Gnasher: Dennis's pet dog, an Abyssinian wire-haired tripe hound. Voiced by Rob Rackstraw (Series 1); Rasmus Hardiker (Series 2).
- Bea: Dennis' baby sister. Voiced by Teresa Gallagher (Series 1); Morwenna Banks (Series 2); Sarah Aubrey (Australia).
- Sandra: Dennis and Bea's mother. She often scolds Dennis when he does something wrong. Voiced by Teresa Gallagher (Series 1); Morwenna Banks (Series 2); Sarah Aubrey (Australia).
- Dennis Sr.: Dennis and Bea's father. He is very strict. Voiced by Rob Rackstraw (Series 1); Natif Ahmed (Series 2).
- Gran: Dennis' grandmother, who is still very young at heart and rides a Charley Davidson motorcycle. Voiced by Jo Wyatt (Series 1); Morwenna Banks (Series 2).
- Gnipper: Gnasher's son, who lives with Gran. Voiced by Rob Rackstraw (Series 1); Rasmus Hardiker (Series 2).
- Curly: Dennis' best friend. Voiced by Teresa Gallagher (Series 1); Rasmus Hardiker (Series 2); Jane Ubrien (Australia).
- Curly Sr.: Curly's father. Voiced by Rob Rackstraw (Series 1); Rasmus Hardiker (Series 2); Keith Scott (Australia).
- Pie-Face: Dennis' other best friend. Voiced by Jo Wyatt (Series 1); Morwenna Banks (Series 2).
- Paul the Potato: Pie-Face's "pet" potato.
- Mr. Pie Face: Pie-Face's father, who owns a pie shop in Beanotown. Voiced by Bob Golding (Series 1); Chris Johnson (Series 2); Keith Scott (Australia).
- Walter: Dennis' next-door neighbour and butt of many of Dennis' pranks or jokes. Voiced by Jo Wyatt (Series 1); Natif Ahmed (Series 2).
- Wilbur Carter Brown: Walter's father. Voiced by Rob Rackstraw (Series 1); Rasmus Hardiker (Series 2); Keith Scott (Australia).
- Bertie Blenkinsop: One of Walter's best friends. Voiced by Rasmus Hardiker (Series 2).
- Sergeant Slipper: A police sergeant and an enemy of Dennis. Voiced by Bob Golding (Series 1); Rasmus Hardiker (Series 2); Keith Scott (Australia).
- Chief Inspector Plimsoll: A short-tempered chief inspector. Voiced by Rob Rackstraw (Series 1).
- The Colonel: A military veteran and a neighbour of Dennis' family. Voiced by Rob Rackstraw (Series 1); Keith Scott (Australia).
- Mr Har-Har: An Asian joke shop owner. His real name is Hari Chandra. Voiced by Bob Golding (Series 1); Rasmus Hardiker (Series 2); Keith Scott (Australia).
- Athena: A rich girl and class mate of Dennis, and the daughter of rock star Ratbucket. She likes makeup and parties, but disapproves of Dennis' mischief. Voiced by Sophie Aldred (Series 1).
- Sugar: A classmate of Dennis and friend of Athena. Voiced by Sophie Aldred (Series 1).
- Mrs Creecher: Dennis' school teacher. Voiced by Jo Wyatt (Series 1); Morwenna Banks (Series 2); Sarah Aubrey (Australia).
- Mr Scrimp: Dennis Sr.'s boss, who falls victim to Dennis' pranks. Voiced by Bob Golding (Series 1).
- Ratbucket: A rock star and Athena's father, of whom Dennis and his friends are fans. Voiced by Bob Golding (Series 1).
- Mr. De Testa: The mayor of Beanotown, and later the school's principal. Voiced by Rob Rackstraw (Series 1); Natif Ahmed (Series 2); Keith Scott (Australia).
- Angel Face: A rival of Dennis' and the daughter of Mr. De Testa, the school's principal. Voiced by Morwenna Banks (Series 2).
- The Postman: A postman whom Gnasher harasses when he delivers the post to Dennis's house. Voiced by Chris Johnson (Series 2).

Additional voices: Sophie Aldred, Teresa Gallagher, Jo Wyatt, Rob Rackstraw, Bob Golding, Adam Henderson, William Henderson, Jane Ubrien, Sarah Aubrey, Keith Scott, Chris Johnson, Natif Ahmed, Morwenna Banks, Rasmus Hardiker.

== Telecast and home media ==
The show began airing on The Hub in the U.S. on the same day the network launched on 10 October 2010. It stopped airing on 7 October 2013.

The programme also airs in Australia on Channel Nine and later on ABC3. The programme also began airing on Disney XD and Nickelodeon Sonic in India. It started airing on Disney Channel Asia on 14 May 2011 until today's years.

Five DVDs have been released and all of series 2 was available to stream on Netflix until 2017.

In Ireland the second series of the show aired on TG4's children's strand Cúla4 dubbed in Irish.

=== DVD releases ===
Region 2
DVD title	Series(s)	Aspect ratio	Episode count	Total running time	Release date(s)
Dennis and Gnasher - Volume 1: Double Trouble	1	16:9	6	60 minutes	8 March 2010
Dennis and Gnasher - Volume 2: School Rules? Highly Over-rated!	1	16:9	6	60 minutes	16 August 2010
Dennis and Gnasher - Volume 3: Fangs For the Memories	1	16:9	8	80 minutes	4 October 2010
Dennis and Gnasher - Volume 4: Masters of Mayhem	1	16:9	6	66 minutes	28 February 2011
Dennis the Menace and Gnasher - Volume 1: Come Menace With Me	2	16:9	6	60 minutes	10 February 2014

== Accolades ==
Awards
Award	Category	Recipients and nominees	Result
British Academy Children's Awards	Animation	Production team	Nominated

== Book ==
On 6 February 2014, a book called The Diary of Dennis the Menace was released to celebrate The Beano's 75-year anniversary. The second book Beanotown Battle was released on 1 May 2014. The third book Rollercoaster Riot was released on 7 August 2014. Steven Butler wrote the books. Butler also released audiobooks for the first three titles. The fourth book Bash Street Bandit was released on 5 February 2015. The fifth book Canine Carnage was released on 2 July 2015. The sixth book The Great Escape was released on 4 February 2016.

== Video game ==
In 2015, Dennis and Gnasher: Adventures! was released for iOS devices. The app was developed by DC Thomson in partnership with LivoBooks, with Mark Cotton leading the project. The four-part story follows Dennis and Gnasher as they battle against a zombie attack in Beanotown. The story allows for camera integration, giving players the opportunity to join Dennis and the gang as part of the story. Users can earn points and badges upon completing the games.
