= CBBC Official Chart Show =

2015 British children's TV series

- Genre: Entertainment & Music
- Presented by: Cel Spellman
- Country of origin: United Kingdom
- Original language: English
- No. of series: 2
- No. of episodes: 69

Production
- Running time: 28 minutes

Original release
- Network: CBBC
- Release: 10 May 2015 – 17 February 2017

The CBBC Official Chart Show is a British children's entertainment series presented by Cel Spellman with Yasser Ranjha and Millie Lloyd as relief presenters. The show first aired on the CBBC network on 10 May 2015 and ended on 17 February 2017. The series was replaced by a new show taking over from April 2017 by The Playlist.

== Format ==
From 10 May 2015 until 5 July 2015 the CBBC Official Chart Show aired from 6.30pm until 7.00pm. It counted down the top 10 tracks of the weeks plus games. The time to announce number 1 came at the same time on the Radio 1 show. On 4 September 2015 the show returned, this time from 5.20pm until 5.50pm on a Friday. It aired until 18 December 2015.

The show returned on 12 March 2016 and for the first three episodes, which aired on Saturdays from 9.50am until 10.20am, were pre-recorded. The show moved to Fridays on 1 April, live, from 5.15pm until 5.45pm. In the second half of the second series the show moved to 7.00pm until 7.30pm. In this series the show was revamped, with viewers being able to vote for 3 songs that would be played on the show under the title 'The Playlist'. For the Christmas Special in 2016, the show moved back to a late afternoon slot, 5.30pm until 6.05pm. There were more games, and the chart was shown at the end of the episode in one block.

Whilst the series was not on air a video of the chart was published on the CBBC website. In the break between series 1 and 2, the video was shown on CBBC every Friday at 6.30pm.

The show was replaced by The Playlist, a show of a similar format in April 2017.

== Presenters ==
Cel Spellman hosted the show since it began in May 2015 till it ended in February 2017. When he was unavailable, relief presenters presented the show for him.

On 29 April, 6 and 20 May and 21 October 2016 the show was presented by Yasser. Yasser and Spellman both presented on 22 July 2016.

Presenters
Name	Title	Duration
Cel Spellman	Main Presenter	2015–2017
Yasser Ranjha	Relief Presenter	2015-2017
Millie Lloyd	Relief Presenter	2015-2017

== Episodes ==
Series	Episodes		Start date	End date
1	26	10	10 May 2015	12 July 2015
1	26	16	4 September 2015	18 December 2015
2	43	20	12 March 2016	22 July 2016
2	43	23	9 September 2016	17 February 2017
