= Scoop (British TV series) =

2009–2011 British children's TV series

- Genre: Sitcom
- Written by: Julian Dutton; Tom Jamieson; Nev Fountain; Martin Hughes; Rory Clark
- Directed by: Sasha Ransome; Jack Jameson; Jason Garbett; David McKay
- Starring: Shaun Williamson; Mark Benton
- Voices of: Andy Heath (series 1); Phil Fletcher (series 2–3)
- Opening theme: "Got to Get that Scoop!"
- Ending theme: "Got to Get that Scoop!" (instrumental)
- Composers: Chris Banks; Darren Loveday
- Country of origin: United Kingdom
- Original language: English
- No. of series: 3
- No. of episodes: 39

Production
- Executive producer: Steven Andrew
- Producer: Jonathan Brown
- Running time: 28 minutes
- Production company: BBC

Original release
- Network: CBBC
- Release: 5 January 2009 – 10 August 2011

Scoop is a children's TV series first broadcast by the BBC on the CBBC channel from 5 January 2009 to 10 August 2011.

The show stars Shaun Williamson as Digby Digworth, an ambitious but inept journalist for a fictional local newspaper, The Pilbury Post. Each episode centres on Digby's failure to get a scoop, ending up causing mayhem and disaster instead. In each of these he is accompanied by Hacker, a dog. The show also stars Mark Benton as the newspaper's short-tempered editor, Max de Lacey and there are guest appearances by popular British TV actors such as Lesley Joseph and Mina Anwar who plays Selena Sharp, reporter for a rival paper. In one episode the famous children's writer J. K. Rowling is parodied as a novelist character called T. K. Towling, while in another Jeremy Clarkson (ex Top Gear presenter) is satirised with the character Clark Jameson.

The episodes are 28 minutes in length and were originally stripped (broadcast every day) across weekdays on BBC One at 3.25 pm between 5 January and 23 January.

Hacker T. Dog, a Border Terrier puppet character, made his first appearance on this show. He was later used as a presenter on the CBBC TV channel. Hacker appeared presenting the CBBC channel from 23 May 2009 with Iain Stirling, a comedian from Edinburgh. In series 1 of Scoop he was operated by Andy Heath, but when he began presenting CBBC he was operated by Phil Fletcher who has puppeteered Hacker since.

A second season began airing in September 2010 and a third began airing a new episode every day from 25 July.

== Plot ==
Each episode begins in much the same way with a short sequence in which Digby is awoken by an elaborate alarm system, then tries in vain to prevent the paperboy throwing his newspaper into a puddle. Similarly the episodes all end in the same way with a short sequence in which the editor inspects a newspaper front page expecting to see a great story, but is instead frustrated when it shows instead a picture depicting the results of Digby's clumsiness and mistakes, at which point Max de Lacey shouts "Digby Digworth!".

In every series 1 episode, Digby and Hacker have to turn to the mysterious Sid the Source when in trouble, who considers covering his face from the public. Hacker often mistakes Sid the Source as a sauce topping, so every time Digby said "Every reporter needs a source", Hacker holds up a different type of sauce each episode.

== Cast ==
- Shaun Williamson as Digby Digworth
- Andy Heath as Hacker (series 1)
- Phil Fletcher as Hacker (series 2–3)
- Mark Benton as Max de Lacey
- Sam Stockman as Simon
- Mina Anwar as Selina Sharp
- Simon Ludders as Sid the Source (series 1)
- Miles Barrow as Newspaper Boy (series 1)
- Iain Stirling as Newspaper Deliverer (series 2)

== Episodes ==
=== Season 1 (2009) ===
| No. overall | No. in season | Title | Written by | Original release date |
|---|---|---|---|---|
| 1 | 1 | "No Newt Is Good Newt" | Julian Dutton | 5 January 2009 |
Digby joins a world-famous explorer in his quest to locate a rare blue spotted newt. Hacker is more interested in tracking the legendary Bigfoot, but regrets his decision when the creature mistakes him for its offspring. Guest Stars: Mina Anwar as Selina Sharp
| 2 | 2 | "Out of This World" | Martin Hughes | 6 January 2009 |
Digby hears about a space-themed photography competition. Hacker agrees to be launched into orbit after learning the first prize is a year's supply of pizza, and his rocket-propelled mission attracts the attention of a like-minded alien. However Pizza Man who runs the shop and competition gets Digby disqualified from the competition by destroying Digby's camera in a blender.
| 3 | 3 | "Monk-y Business" | Julian Dutton | 7 January 2009 |
Local reporter Digby Digworth discovers an ancient map after being given a seemingly hopeless story to cover at Pilbury monastery.
| 4 | 4 | "Cat-astrophe" | Rory Clark | 8 January 2009 |
Digby is sent to interview a leading model, but his dog Hacker is not happy when it turns out to be a cat. Unfortunately, they get the blame after the feline celebrity escapes, leading them to take drastic measures to get it back.
| 5 | 5 | "Fight Night" | Martin Hughes | 9 January 2009 |
Wrestling fever hits town as US legend "The Ballista" prepares for a one-off bout in Pilbury.
| 6 | 6 | "Hair Brained Scheme" | Tom Jamieson; Nev Fountain | 12 January 2009 |
An action movie star is in town promoting his new film, and Digby Digworth becomes convinced he is bald. The reporter sets out to take an incriminating photo of the actor, but he must avoid the clutches of a hotel's ferocious manager. Guest Star: Lesley Joseph as Mrs Green
| 7 | 7 | "Don't Read All About It" | Julian Dutton | 13 January 2009 |
Famous children's author T.K. Towling comes to town to promote the latest book in her popular 'Billy Watson' series and both Digby and rival journalist Selena Sharp compete to be the first to interview her. Unfortunately Hacker destroys the only copy of the new book and Digby has to think fast to replace it. Guest Stars: Mina Anwar as Selina Sharp
| 8 | 8 | "Gran Day Out" | Tom Jamieson; Nev Fountain | 14 January 2009 |
Reporter Digby Digworth is on the case of a sweet-toothed crime gang called the Battenburglars, who replace the valuables they steal with cakes. Meanwhile, Hacker grows suspicious when the investigative duo are sent to interview an elderly granny in Pilbury's tea shop.
| 9 | 9 | "Magnetic Attraction" | Martin Hughes | 15 January 2009 |
Digby is sent to investigate a new police robot. Guest Stars: Julian Dutton as Inspector Wainwright
| 10 | 10 | "Stop Gear" | Tom Jamieson; Nev Fountain | 16 January 2009 |
Reporter Digby Digworth is sent to get a shot of the world's largest biscuit.
| 11 | 11 | "Keep Young and Beautiful" | Rory Clark | 19 January 2009 |
Digby Digworth and Hacker are sent to investigate a local cosmetics laboratory where an inventor has created a revolutionary anti-ageing cream, but interfere in the product's mixing process - with disastrous consequences.
| 12 | 12 | "Environ-Mental" | Rory Clark | 20 January 2009 |
The Pilbury Post embarks on an environmentally friendly campaign, and Digby Digworth's efforts to reduce greenhouse gases are thwarted by attempts to break a world record.
| 13 | 13 | "Bloomin' Marvellous" | Tom Jamieson; Nev Fountain | 21 January 2009 |
Digby goes head to head with his arch-rival Selena Sharp to photograph the world's rarest plant. The species only flowers once every 100 years, so Digby has to capture the moment before it is too late. Guest Stars: Mina Anwar as Selina Sharp

=== Season 2 (2010) ===
| No. overall | No. in season | Title | Written by | Original release date |
|---|---|---|---|---|
| 14 | 1 | "Trying My Patients" | Julian Dutton | 22 September 2010 |
After an accident in Max's office, Digby ends up in hospital with a broken arm - but even that does not stop him from chasing a story about the captain of Pilbury United "Pedro Ramirez" who is also staying in the same hospital. But little does Digby know, that Pedro is directly opposite him in the same ward. Guest Stars: Stewart Scudamore as Dr Carlton and Barbara Durkin as the Nurse.
| 15 | 2 | "Curses Foiled Again" | Tom Jamieson; Nev Fountain | 29 September 2010 |
Digby wants to report on a cursed Egyptian statue at the local museum and pitches the idea to Max. Max is reluctant to send Digby there at first, but when Digby mentions curses, Max changes his mind immediately. Once there Dr Sandybottom - an ancient Egyptologist entrusts Digby to guard an ancient artifact "Mukkipup" ( a statue that looks an awful lot like Hacker!) Little does Digby know, that Sandybottom is attempting to steal the artifact, frame Digby for the theft and sell it for millions. Digby panics when he notices "Mukkipup" is missing and gets Hacker to stand in for it, to fool the security guard. All is going to plan for Sandybottom until the mummy's curse sets in. Guest Stars: Stewart Scudamore as Dr Edward Sandybum and Chizzy Akudolu as Carol the security guard.
| 16 | 3 | "You Are Feeling Very Sneaky" | Tom Jamieson; Nev Fountain | 6 October 2010 |
Digby wants to report on the spate of burglaries around Pilbury. But Max has had enough of Hacker's practical jokes so sends them down to pet therapist Darren Hound. A scoop seems off the cards until Digby works out that Darren is hypnotising pets to steal from their owners! Whilst looking for evidence, Digby and Hacker are suspected of being the thieves and go on the run. Can Digby and Hacker catch the real crook without being hypnotised and prove their innocence? Guest Stars: Paul Hawkyard as Darren Hound.
| 17 | 4 | "Army Manoeuvres" | Ciaran Murtagh; Andrew Jones | 13 October 2010 |
Digby is annoyed when the Pilbury Post publish a story stating that he is officially "The worst reporter in the world!", which even Hacker has contributed to. Digby ignores the story and goes to Max's office to see if there are any scoops. Max sends Digby and Hacker to the local army base. Digby finds army life too tough to bear and there's no story in sight, until Hacker overhears Sergeant Bluster plotting to do away with the colonel. Guest Stars: Stephen Bent as Sergeant Bluster and Tony Aitken as Colonel Winters.
| 18 | 5 | "Digby and the Viking" | Martin Hughes | 20 October 2010 |
Max sends Digby and Hacker metal detecting in Viking Woods. Digby thinks he has found a hoard of ancient treasure but has actually unearthed a notorious criminal (The Pilbury Panther)'s buried loot. Hacker has to resort to kung fu to protect his master, but can he combat an ancient Viking ghost? Guest stars: Paul Hawkyard as The Pilbury Panther, Daniel Richard Wright as PC Taylor and Steve Marsh as DCI Grunt.
| 19 | 6 | "The Laughing Cavalier" | Ciaran Murtagh; Andrew Jones | 27 October 2010 |
Max sends Digby to his brother's mansion to report on a friendly ghost called the Laughing Cavalier. Unfortunately, Digby manages to wipe the smile from his face and worse still Hacker destroys it with his Ghoulie Blaster. Digby has to stand in for the ghost, but can he fool world-renowned spooky expert Antonia De Ghoul? Guest Stars: Nick Wilton as Rex De Lacey, Jess Robinson as Antonia De Ghoul and Paul Hawkyard as The Laughing Cavalier.
| 20 | 7 | "The Heat Is On" | Ciaran Murtagh; Andrew Jones | 3 November 2010 |
Pilbury is in the grip of a heatwave and Digby and Hacker are sent to the park to get some summer photos. Digby puts his stomach first and heads for the nearest ice-cream van. But Hacker is suspicious of the mysterious owners (who are charging £25 each for ice-cream and are claiming to be the only ice-cream men in town) and their satellite dish - just what is creating the sizzling weather? Digby and Hacker investigate! Guest Stars: Daniel Richard Wright as Mr Chillie and Steve Marsh as Mr Burr.
| 21 | 8 | "Freeze a Jolly Good Caveman" | Julian Dutton | 10 November 2010 |
Professor Krinkelhoff has discovered a frozen caveman and has transported it to Pilbury Museum. Digby pops in to have a sneaky peek, but Hacker manages to unfreeze the caveman! Chaos ensues as they are called to a local party - with one extra hairy guest! Guest Stars: Mark Perry as Professor Krinkelhoff, Hugh Clay Jones as the Caveman and Barbara Durkin as Mrs DeLacey.
| 22 | 9 | "Fangs for the Memory" | Rory Clark | 17 November 2010 |
Digby and Selina go head-to-head in a retirement home to interview Britain's oldest man. However, finding out the secret to long life becomes complicated when Jack loses his false teeth! It's up to Hacker to retrieve them from the home's sewage system. Guest Stars: Mina Anwar as Selina Sharp and Tony Aitken as Jack.
| 23 | 10 | "Double Digby" | Julian Dutton | 24 November 2010 |
Criminal mastermind Fingers Golightly has to return to a hotel to retrieve a priceless diamond. He disguises himself as Digby to throw the police off the scent - but things get complicated when the real Digby turns up at the hotel for an annual teddy bear convention. Guest Stars: Mina Anwar as Selina Sharp and Daniel Tatarsky as Inspector Mortlake.
| 24 | 11 | "Down in the Mouth" | Ciaran Murtagh; Andrew Jones | 1 December 2010 |
Captain Croc's new sweetie, Grinballs, is proving irresistible to the people of Pilbury. Digby is no exception and soon ends up in the dentist's chair under the watchful eye of Dr McCavity. But Hacker unearths a massive scoop when he discovers there is more to the mysterious dentist than meets the eye. Guest Stars: James Hurn as Dr McCavity and Lesley Joseph as the Dentist Receptionist.
| 25 | 12 | "Back Tu-dor Future" | Tom Jamieson; Nev Fountain | 8 December 2010 |
Digby takes a comfort break in a builder's portaloo just as it is delivered to a historical re-enactment society. He exits and is convinced he has time travelled to King Henry VIII's royal court. Digby is determined to stop Henry executing Anne Boleyn but things don't go according to plan as his own head ends up on the chopping block - with Hacker as the executioner! Guest Stars: Stephen Bent as Henry VIII, Stephen Bent as the PC, Nicola Bryant as Anne Boleyn and Nicola Bryant as the PC's wife
| 26 | 13 | "Court in the Act" | Julian Dutton | 15 December 2010 |
Digby thinks he has been summoned to court to pay a parking fine but it turns out that he is being charged with 892 offences against the people of Pilbury. His only is hope is calling on his main character witness Hacker T Dog. Guest Stars: Mina Anwar as Selina Sharp and Tony Aitken as the judge.

=== Season 3 (2011) ===
| No. overall | No. in season | Title | Written by | Original release date |
|---|---|---|---|---|
| 27 | 1 | "The Big Cat" | Mark Brotherhood | 25 July 2011 |
Digby takes Hacker to Sykes' farm to find out why no egg deliveries were made and learns that the hens are scared to lay as a giant wild cat is prowling the area. Digby builds a trap to catch the beast only to discover that it is a tiny but extremely vicious kitten. But even somebody as stupid as Digby Digworth could not fail to outwit a kitten?
| 28 | 2 | "Restaurant Reservation" | Martin Hughes | 26 July 2011 |
Sent to deliver the paper to chef Lester Lukenal at the Skinny Mallard restaurant Digby is mistaken for the food critic judging Lester's Pudding of the Year entry - which of course he destroys. Whilst Digby diverts Lester by ordering a meal Hacker attempts a repair job but when the real critic arrives she gets a surprise when the pudding is unveiled. Guest stars: Gavin Mitchell as Lester.
| 29 | 3 | "Going For Gold" | Alexandra Owen | 27 July 2011 |
Digby vows to save the Pilbury scout hut from being demolished to make way for a Hippo hypermarket, in the process hoping to gain his gold award badge at last. After he and Hacker have staged a sit-down protest Selina turns up, expecting Digby's ineptitude to provide her with a scoop of her own. When Digby decides to pull the hut to safety, Selina is not disappointed.
| 30 | 4 | "Seeing Stars" | Martin Hughes | 28 July 2011 |
Max sends Digby and Hacker to accompany his precocious niece Belinda who has won a contest to meet Geordie pop star Leonie Hart. However Digby falls foul of Leonie's manager and his efforts to smuggle Belinda into the studio end up by incapacitating Leonie. When the two girls finally meet it is not a happy encounter - and Hacker is there to capture it on camera.
| 31 | 5 | "Foul Play" | Keith Cotton | 29 July 2011 |
As a lifelong supporter of Pilbury United Digby defies Max and goes to the press conference for the team's hot new signing, striker Carl Plummer - and overhears Carl planning to steal the transfer money. Digby gets Hacker to swap the money into another bag whilst he creates a diversion on the pitch. His skills are dazzling - sadly his plan is anything but.
| 32 | 6 | "Come in Digby, Your Time's Up" | Tom Jamieson; Nev Fountain | 1 August 2011 |
When Max's eccentric aunt Annie specifically asks that Digby writes an article on her antique shop, (the oldest shop in Pilbury), it is inevitable that his clumsiness will result in all the antiques being smashed. However, this is just what Annie wants, so that she can close the shop and open a cats' home . However, no one has told Digby, who tries to hide in a grandfather clock, only to find it has been delivered to Max's office. Guest Stars: Louise Gold as Annie Haven.
| 33 | 7 | "Always the Bridesmaid" | Ciaran Murtagh; Andrew Jones | 2 August 2011 |
Digby is sent to cover a society wedding, where, prior to the ceremony, he starts eating the cake and spatters the bridal gown with icing. Though he and Hacker do their best to fix things, Hacker's swallowing the wedding ring and Digby's plan to put everything right so that the guests will never notice lead to a registry riot.
| 34 | 8 | "Taking Pictures" | Julian Dutton | 3 August 2011 |
Digby and Hacker become security guards at Pilbury art gallery to lay a trap for the thief stealing portraits of local worthies, including Hacker's painting of Max. Overhearing the gallery owner making a sale of two cars over the phone Digby assumes she is the thief and tells the head of security - which is not a good idea as he is the actual burglar.
| 35 | 9 | "First Past the Post" | Sarah Morgan | 4 August 2011 |
Max is furious when he finds out that Digby and Hacker skive off work to go to a football match and so decides to give them a punishment. Digby is worried that he'll get the sack and wonders if it would be better to resign rather than let Max sack him. Digby and Hacker write a rude letter to Max, telling him what they really think. Digby tells Hacker to post it to Max's office but then changes his mind the next morning. Can Digby and Hacker stop the letter from reaching Max's office?
| 36 | 10 | "Northenders" | Rory Clark | 5 August 2011 |
Whilst visiting the studios where the top soap 'NorthEnders' is recorded Digby causes chaos on the set but Hacker wins a role in the soap, becoming so popular that a jealous co-star sabotages his big scene, getting him the sack. To save his friend's job Digby breaks into the studio office to find his contract but only succeeds in wiping clean a week's episodes from the computer.
| 37 | 11 | "Digby's Dilemma" | Dominic McDonald | 8 August 2011 |
When he's looking for love, Max sends Digby and Hacker to check out the Warm Hugs Dating Agency, run by gold-digging Veronica Potts. Wrongly believing Digby to be wealthy, Miss Potts comes on to him but throws him out after he has given her a supposedly valuable necklace. Digby's efforts to retrieve the necklace result in the destruction of the agency's computer and Max ending up with a very unlikely date.
| 38 | 12 | "Now That's Magic" | Rob Gibbons; Neil Gibbons | 9 August 2011 |
When Digby pitches to Max a story about the local fun run, Max misunderstands and thinks that Digby wants to run the race for the Pilbury Post. When Digby tries to explain, Max won't listen and then when Hacker accidentally manages to handcuff them both together by a failed magic trick, the situation gets a whole lot worse!
| 39 | 13 | "The Digworth Method" | Ciaran Murtagh; Andrew Jones | 10 August 2011 |
When asked to organise a presentation to the local college, Digby faces his long-time reporting rival, Selina Sharp. Will he fall for her tricks once again? Guest Stars: Mina Anwar as Selina Sharp
