= Andy Heath (puppeteer) =

British puppeteer

Andy Heath is a British puppeteer. He is most noted for working as the head puppeteer for the BBC Three situation comedy Mongrels, where he controls the main character, Nelson the metrosexual fox. He also puppeteered Hacker T Dog in CBBC's Scoop, who is currently performed by Phil Fletcher. He has also worked on television show Fur TV and on the film version of The Hitchhiker's Guide to the Galaxy (2005).

Heath also was involved with the Gorillaz Demon Days: Live at the Manchester Opera House on 1–5 November 2005, as the personal assistant for the puppets of Murdoc and 2D. He also worked on the UK adaptation of US children's television series Play with Me Sesame.
