= Leona Vaughan =

Welsh actress

- Born: 13 February 1995 (age 30); Caerphilly County Borough, Wales
- Occupation: Actress
- Television: Wolfblood; Stella

Leona Kate Vaughan (born 13 February 1995) is a Welsh actress from Caerphilly, South Wales. She has attended the Mark Jermin Stage School. She starred in CBBC's television series Wolfblood as Jana and in Stella as Cerys.

== Filmography ==
Film
Year	Title	Role	Notes
2015	Bridgend	Grace	

Television
Year	Title	Role	Notes
2013–2017	Wolfblood	Jana	Recurring role (series 2); Main role (series 3); Lead role (series 4–5)
2015–2017	Stella	Cerys Ferris	Recurring role (series 4–5)
2016–2017	Wolfblood Secrets	Jana	Recurring role
2016	Casualty	Carly Fielden	Episode: All I Want for Christmas Is You
2017	Cops and Monsters	Alicia Hughes	Episode: Fight the Bite; Episode: Inhuman Nature
2017	Top Class	Contestant	Episode: Celebrity Special
2022	Casualty	Kellie Denton	Episode: Leap of Faith

== Awards and nominations ==
Year	Nominated work	Category	Award	Result	Ref.
2016	Wolfblood	2016 Children's Performer	BAFTA Children's Award	Nominated	
