= All Over the Place (TV programme) =

British television series

- Directed by: Natalie Moss
- Presented by: Ed Petrie
- Composer: Richie Webb
- Country of origin: United Kingdom
- Original language: English
- No. of series: 9
- No. of episodes: 65

Production
- Executive producer: Louise Corbett
- Running time: 29 minutes

Original release
- Network: CBBC; CBBC HD
- Release: 5 February 2011 – present

All Over the Place is a children's television program produced by the BBC. It features the former CBBC links presenter Ed Petrie as lead presenter, joined across the series by various other CBBC hosts including Chris Johnson, Cel Spellman, Richard Wisker, Barney Harwood, Naomi Wilkinson, Sam & Mark, Michelle Ackerley, Lauren Layfield, Johny Pitts and Iain Stirling.

The first two series featured attractions and events primarily in the United Kingdom. The third took the same format but travelled around the USA; the fourth series was based in Australia and the fifth and sixth visited countries around Europe. The 7th and 8th series are about Asia. All Over the Place Asia Part 1 was broadcast on CBBC on Monday 16 January 2017. This new series included a new presenter Inel Tomlinson. The eighth series, All Over The Place Asia part 2, was broadcast on Saturday 6 January 2018, and every Saturday for 15 weeks.

== Format ==
The show features the presenters traveling all over the place in the UK and finding strange places to visit. Almost every episode includes a song and a competition segment at the end of the show.

Places visited include:

- Air guitar world championships
- Bat hospital on the Isle of Wight
- The world's largest vacuum cleaner collection, whose owner could tell any vacuum cleaner from its sound alone
- Preston Bus Station
- The Alnwick Castle treehouse
- The Storybook Glen
- The Superlambanana in Liverpool.
- Diggerland in Kent
- A World War II veteran pigeon named Paddy
- Dickens World
- Shakespeare's home town of Stratford-Upon-Avon

The show also features different segments throughout each series including:

- Things that stick out of the (sea, river, ground etc.)
- Grown-ups collect stuff too
- Why have we stopped here....because it's random
- What are you thinking?
- Things that you see, when you stop for a...
- Things that you munch, when you stop for your lunch
- Bet you didn't know this about.....
- The Song
- The Main Event

== Presenters ==
=== Main presenter ===
Name	Duration	Series
Ed Petrie	2011–	1-
Various	2018–	8–

=== Co-presenters ===
Name	Duration	Series
Barney Harwood	2011–2012, 2016, 2018	1–2, 6 and 8
Iain Stirling	2011–2015, 2017	1–5 and 7
Johny Pitts	2011–2018	1–8
Chris Johnson	2012, 2015–2018	2, 5, 6, 7 and 8
Cel Spellman	2012–2014, 2017–2018	2–4, 7–8
Richard Wisker	2012–2013	2–3.
Rani Price	2012	2.
Naomi Wilkinson	2012–	2–
Holly Walsh	2011	1.
Dick & Dom	2011	1.
Gemma Hunt	2011	1.
Joe Swash	2011	1.
London Hughes	2011	1.
Sam & Mark	2015–2016, 2017,2019–	5–6 and 7,9-
Ore Oduba	2014	4.
Katie Thistleton	2014	4.
Michelle Ackerley	2013–2017	3–7
Ben Shires	2016–2018	6–8
Victoria Cook	2015–2018	5–8
Lauren Layfield	2016–	6-
Susan Calman	2014; 2016–2017	4; 6–7
Inel Tomlinson	2017–	7-
Johnny Cochrane	2018–	8-
Richard David-Caine	2018–	8-
Bobby Lockwood	2018	8
Ricky Martin	2018–	8-
Talisha 'Tee Cee' Johnson	2018	8
Yasmin Evans	2019–	9-

== Episodes ==
=== Series 1 (UK) ===
The songs featured in Series 1 include

- Storybook Glen (parody of Beat Again by JLS)
- Castle Ward
- The 8 Wonders of the Isle of Wight
- Do the Twisted Spire
- Chinese Arch (parody of Chelsea Dagger by The Fratellis)
- Preston Bus Station (parody of Sound of the Underground by Girls Aloud)
- Marsden Grotto
- Lost Gardens of Heligan
- Burning House (parody of Sex on Fire by Kings of Leon)
- House in the Clouds (parody of Our House by Madness)
- Rollercoaster (parody of Hot N Cold by Katy Perry)
- Longest Train Station Name in the UK

=== Series 2 (UK) ===
The songs featured in series 2 include

- Gold Panning (parody of Gold Digger by Kanye West)
- Paddy the Pigeon (parody of U2)
- Llandudno (parody of Pass Out by Tinie Tempah)
- Shakespeare (parody of Tragedy by Steps)
- Can I Dig It? (parody of Can I Kick It by A Tribe Called Quest)
- Hellfire (parody of Fire by Kasabian)
- Ayot St. Lawrence (parody of Country House by Blur)
- Penguin Face (parody of Poker Face by Lady Gaga)
- Rugby (parody of Highway to Hell by AC/DC)
- Fight For This Earth (parody of Fight For This Love by Cheryl Cole)
- Dickensworld
- Funicular (parody of Umbrella by Rihanna & JAY Z)

#	Episode	Airdate	Main event winner
1 (14)	Series 2, Episode 1	25 January 2012	Iain
Grown Ups Collect Stuff too: Gadgets What are you Thinking?: Wheels Things that Stick out of...: Electric Mountain The Song: Gold Panning (spoof of Gold Digger by Kanye West ) The Main Event: Rafting
2 (15)	Series 2, Episode 2	1 February 2012	Iain
Grown Ups Collect Stuff too: Little Village What are you Thinking?: Big Hands Why have we stopped here? Because it's Random: Treasure in the Thames The Song: Paddy the Pigeon The Main Event: Peddle Boat Racing
3 (16)	Series 2, Episode 3	8 February 2012	Both Presenters
Grown Ups Collect Stuff too: Televisions What are you Thinking?: Round Object Things that Stick out of...: Astrocentre The Song: Long Things in Llandudno (spoof of "Pass Out" by Tinie Tempah) The Main Event: Shirt racing
4 (17)	Series 2, Episode 4	15 February 2012	Ed
Grown Ups Collect Stuff too: Royal Objects What are you Thinking?: Mazes Why have we stopped here? Because it's Random: Sheep Racing The Song: Shakespeare (spoof of "Tragedy" by Steps) The Main Event: Bog Snorkelling
5 (18)	Series 2, Episode 5	22 February 2012	No Winner
Grown Ups Collect Stuff too: Marbles What are you Thinking?: Swimming Things that Stick out of...: Fossils on the beach The Song: Diggerland The Main Event: Tin Bath racing
6 (19)	Series 2, Episode 6	29 February 2012	Ed
Grown Ups Collect Stuff too: Wind up things What are you Thinking?: Wind Things that Stick out of...: The Channel Tunnel The Song: Hellfire Caves (spoof of 'Fire' by Kasabian ) The Main Event: Orange Rolling
7 (20)	Series 2, Episode 7	7 March 2012	Ed
Grown Ups Collect Stuff too: Horse Shoes What are you Thinking?: Statue Things that Stick out of...: Houses Why have we stopped here? Because it's Random: N/A Bet you didn't know this about... : N/A The Song: Ayot St. Laurence Church (spoof of Country House by Blur ) The Main Event: Waiter Racing
8 (21)	Series 2, Episode 8	14 March 2012	Iain
Grown Ups Collect Stuff too: Teddies What are you Thinking?: Small Houses Things that Stick out of...: Man made Lake The Song: Penguins (spoof of Poker Face by Lady GaGa ) The Main Event: Pea Shooting
9 (22)	Series 2, Episode 9	21 March 2012	Naomi
Grown Ups Collect Stuff too: Tanks What are you Thinking?: Narnia Statue Things that Stick out of...: London Garbage Why have we stopped here? Because it's Random: N/A Bet you didn't know this about... : N/A The Song: Rugby (spoof of Highway to Hell by AC/DC ) The Main Event: Sandcastle Contest
10 (23)	Series 2, Episode 10	28 March 2012	Ed
Grown Ups Collect Stuff too: Planes What are you Thinking?: Chillie Farm Things that Stick out of...: Mine Bet you didn't know this about... : Hockey The Song: Fight for this Earth – Centre for Alternative Technology Machynlleth (spoof of Fight For This Love by Cheryl Cole ) The Main Event: Boat Race
11 (24)	Series 2, Episode 11	11 March 2012	Ed
Grown Ups Collect Stuff too: Bagpipes What are you Thinking?: Police Box Things that Stick out of...: Model Village The Song: Dickensworld The Main Event: Custard Pie Fight
12 (25)	Series 2, Episode 12	18 March 2012	Ed
Grown Ups Collect Stuff too: Statues What are you Thinking?: Elephants Bet you didn't know this about... : Gargoyles The Song: Funicular Railway (spoof of 'Umbrella' by Rihanna ) The Main Event: Wool Sack Racing
13 (26)	Series 2, Episode 13	25 March 2012	N/A
The Song: Storybook Glen, Gold Panning, Hellfire Caves, Shakespeare, Preston Bus Station, Fight for this Earth, Twisted Spire, Rollercoaster

=== Series 3 (USA) ===
A third series was confirmed at the end of Series 2. It was filmed in 2012 and aired in 2013. Instead of being set in the U.K, the presenters visited the United States.

Ed was joined by Naomi Wilkinson, Jonny Pitts, Cellach Spellman, Iain Stirling, Richard Wisker and Michelle Ackerley.

All Over the Place USA was executive produced by Louise Corbett and produced by Maria Stewart.

The songs in series 3 included:

- Tombstone Cowboys (parody of "Another One Bites the Dust" by Queen)
- Nyberg (parody of "Empire State of Mind" by Alicia Keys and JAY Z)
- Las Vegas Wedding (parody of "Marry You" by Bruno Mars)
- Mall of America (parody of "Price Tag" by Jessie J)
- Troll Town (parody of "Chasing The Sun" by The Wanted)
- They Built This White House Upside Down (parody of "We Built This City" by Starship)
- Petrified (parody of 90s club music)
- London Bridge Ain’t Falling Down (parody of "LDN" BY Lily Allen)
- Giant Christmas Store (parody of "Merry Xmas Everybody" by Slade)
- Heidelberg Project
- Party Shop (parody of "Party Rock Anthem" by LMFAO)
- Paul Bunyan Land (parody of "What Makes You Beautiful" by One Direction)

=== Series 4 (Australia) ===
A fourth series, All Over the Place Australia, was broadcast from 2014. As the title indicates, this series focuses on events and attractions in Australia.

1/15 Ed and Cel go head-to-head at a sheep-shearing competition in Mullewa.

2/15 Ed and Naomi race mobile toilets in Winton's Dunny Derby.

3/15 Fancy making a big splash at a disused water park in Perth? What about discovering how termites make didgeridoos, or how about watching Edward Safety Scissorhands doing a bit of gardening in Tasmania? Yup, all this plus a step-by-step guide to playing 18-a-side Aussie rules football in Adelaide, and Ed and Johny compete in a boat race on a dried-up riverbed at the Henley-on-Todd Regatta in Alice Springs.

4/15 Fancy a toboggan ride down Australia's highest mountain? What about learning how to throw a boomerang in Perth, or panning for gold Gangnam-style in a real gold-mining town in Victoria? Yes, all this plus a bizarre and grotesque collection of clockwork toys in Adelaide, and Ed and Naomi smash some plates and stomp on grapes at Townsville's annual Greek Festival.

5/15 Fancy swimming with one of the biggest crocodiles on the planet in Darwin? How about eating fruit that tastes like chocolate, or visiting a Spanish castle near Cairns? Well, there's all this plus we find out how to make wooden clogs in a bonkers barn in Coffs Harbour, and Ed and Michelle compete in the Derby River Derby - a rubber ring raft race-type thing.

6/15 Fancy diving in the Great Barrier Reef without even getting your hair wet? How about feeling the muscles of a two-metre-tall kangaroo in Alice Springs, or discovering Australia's capital city in Kylie Minogue style? Well, there's all this, plus we visit a car graveyard that has been turned into an outdoor art gallery and Ed and Naomi compete to see who can eat the largest amount of bogey-looking shellfish in Ceduna's Oyster Festival!

7/15 Fancy learning how to handle some seriously wriggly snakes in Perth? How about climbing aboard a shipwrecked sailing boat in Adelaide, or finding out how witchetty grubs can soothe sunburn in an Alice Springs desert? Well, there's all this plus a big thing in Coffs Harbour in the shape of an enormous banana, and Ed and Michelle get blinged up when they go gold-digging in South Australia.

8/15 Fancy digging for eggs made by a volcano in Queensland? How about discovering one of the oldest paintings on the planet, in a cave near the Brambuk Aboriginal Centre, or going a bit potty over a collection of 3,000 teapots? Well, there's all this plus we have exclusive access to the Sydney Opera House! And Ed and Johny compete to see who'll be the best Aussie cowboy at the Camooweal Drovers Festival.

9/15 Fancy digging for million-year-old opals in Coober Pedy? How about discovering limestone formations made from old crustaceans at the Pinnacles in Western Australia, or meeting a pretzel-eating camel at Uluru? Well, there's all that plus a visit to a place in Tasmania where every day grease is the word, and Ed and Naomi go head-to-head, or should that be hand-to-hand in a one-armed prawn-peeling competition at the Cabramatta Moon Festival in Sydney.

10/15 Fancy watching 70,000 little penguins waddle up a beach on Phillip Island? How about visiting Coober Pedy to play desert golf with no greens, or waltzing with Matilda around a billabong in Winton? Well, there's all this plus a monster collection of trucks in Alice Springs and Ed and Johny go head-to-head in a race to pull a giant metal mammal up a hill at Eden Whale Festival!

11/15 The episode features a climb of Sydney Harbour Bridge. It also features a man from Perth who has a collection of 500,000 spiders, or watching a movie at Darwin's deckchair cinema? Well, there's all this plus we visit the largest sand island in the world and Ed and Naomi compete to be the best street performer at the Coffs Harbour International Buskers Festival.

12/15 Fancy eating a pie called a floater in Sydney? How about exploring an outdoor art gallery made of wooden bollards in Geelong, or discovering a magical wall with household objects stuck to it? Well, there's all this and we visit a town called Alice. Plus, Ed and Cel find out that cooking doesn't get much tougher than in the outback at Trundle's Bush Tucker Day, where the loser has to eat a witchetty grub!

13/15 Fancy exploring Coober Pedy, where people live underground? How about sandboarding on the gnarly dunes of Lancelin, or living as a convict for the day in Sydney? Well, there's all this and we also visit a Tasmanian town full of massive murals. Plus, Ed and Iain compete in a surfboat championship - who will catch the biggest wave in Surfer's Paradise?

14/15 Find out who will win the trophy for Best Presenter in a Main Event! Ed Petrie goes head-to-head with Michelle Ackerley, Johny Pitts, Ceallach Spellman, Iain Stirling and Naomi Wilkinson in events such as a one-armed prawn-peeling competition at the Cabramatta Moon Festival, a Dunny Derby mobile toilet race in Winton, a giant metal whale pull up a steep hill at the Eden Whale Festival, and a kayak race in a dried-up riverbed at Henley on Todd's annual regatta.

15/15 Ed Petrie and Iain Stirling catch a ferry to Sydney's Manly Beach to introduce us to a bizarre Aussie musical road trip. They are joined by Naomi Wilkinson, Johny Pitts, Michelle Ackerley and Ceallach Spellman, who sing their way around some of the most interesting places in Australia.

=== Series 5 (Europe) ===
A fifth series, All Over the Place Europe, began airing on CBBC in early 2015. The show follows the usual AOTP format, including regular fixtures such as 'Grown Ups Collect Stuff Too', 'Things that Stick Out...', 'The Song' and 'The Main Event', and applies them to attractions found in countries across Europe. Newcomers to the presenter lineup this series include Victoria Cook (of DNN: Definitely Not Newsround).

=== Series 6 (Europe) ===
A sixth series, All Over the Place Europe: Part 2, began airing on CBBC from 4–22 January 2016 with newcomers Ben Shires from Officially Amazing and Match of the Day Kickabout, Susan Calman (from Top Class) and Lauren Layfield (from CBBC HQ and The Dengineers).

=== Series 7 (Asia) ===
Ed Petrie confirmed on Twitter that All Over the Place Asia began filming in 2016 and would be broadcast in 2017. He later announced that the new series would start on Monday 16 January 2017 at 7.45am, on CBBC with returning presenter Cel Spellman, whose last All Over the Place series was series 4 in Australia, and new presenter Inel Tomlinson, known for being part of the comic duo, Johnny & Inel.

=== Series 8 (Asia Part 2) ===
Ed Petrie confirmed on Facebook that All Over the Place Asia Part 2, began filming in 2017 and would be broadcast in 2018. He later announced that the new series would start on Saturday 6 January 2018 at 9.00am, on CBBC. This series was also the first one to not have Ed Petrie appear in every section as some co-presenters doubled up, such as Chris Johnson with Lauren Layfield and Johnny Cochrane with Inel Tomlinson. The new series contained returning presenter Barney Harwood from Blue Peter, whose last All Over the Place series was Series 6 in Europe, and new presenters Ricky Martin from Art Ninja, Tee Cee from WHOOPS I MISSED THE BUS, Bobby Lockwood from Wolfblood, Richard David-Caine from Class Dismissed and Johnny Cochrane from The Johnny and Inel Show. Johnny is also the other half of 'Johnny and Inel' (Inel already appears in the show).

Series 8 Episode 1

Title: Supertrees, Laughter Yoga and Rockets

Start block: Gardeners of the Galaxy (parody of Guardians of the Galaxy)

Why have we stopped here? Because it's random (Laughter Yoga)

Song: Mepantigan Mud Games (parody of Shape of You by Ed Sheeran)

Things that you munch, when you stop for your lunch (Kimchi)

Ed vs Richard: The Main Event (rocket festival, Laos)

Series 8 Episode 2

Title: Komodo Dragons, K-Pop and Songkran

Start block: Komodo Dragons

Things That Stick Out of the...(Ground (Genghis Khan statue))

Song: Seoul fan (parody of Soul Man) fused with K-Pop Star (parody of Gangnam Style by Psy)

Things that you munch...when you stop for your lunch (YouChew (parody of YouTube) and Vietnamese Food)

Inel vs Johnny: The Main Event (Songkran (Thai New Year) water fight)

=== Series 9 (UK) ===
A new All Over the Place UK began filming in 2018 and was broadcast in 2019. The new series started on Monday 25 February 2019 at 4:30pm on CBBC. This series was the second not to have Ed Petrie appear in every section as some co-presenters doubled up, such as Richard David-Caine with Inel Tomlinson and Sam Nixon with Mark Rhodes. The new series contained returning presenters Sam & Mark, whose last All Over the Place series was Series 7 in Asia (in past series they only featured in sketches but in Series 9 they presented segments on location), and new presenter Yasmin Evans from Saturday Mash-Up!, as well as a variety of vloggers who introduced and linked segments in the show.

== Accolades ==
Awards
Award	Category	Recipients and nominees	Result
British Academy Children's Awards	BAFTA Kid's Vote – Television	All Over the Place – Australia	Nominated

== Spin-off ==
In 2016, a spin-off series titled All Over the Workplace premiered. The series is hosted by Alex Riley and is narrated by Ed Petrie. Two series have aired.
