= Phil Fletcher =

British puppeteer

- Born: 27 October 1976 (age 49); Hindley, Greater Manchester, England
- Occupations: Entertainer, puppeteer
- Notable work: Hacker T Dog

Phil Fletcher (born 27 October 1976) is a British puppeteer. He established his puppet manufacturing and performance company, Gluvets, at the age of 11. After briefly working in manufacturing he found summer work performing in holiday camps and became a full-time puppeteer in 2002.

In 2009, he was cast by the BBC as the puppeteer for Hacker T Dog for continuity segments on the CBBC Channel. Fletcher gave Hacker a voice for the first time and the character proved popular, receiving his own 63-episode TV series, Hacker Time, which was nominated for eight BAFTAs.

From 2017, Fletcher voiced Sweep in Sooty and from 2021 has appeared as Larry the Lizard on Buffering.

== Early life ==
Phil Fletcher was born in Hindley, Greater Manchester, on 27 October 1976. He developed an interest in puppeteering as a child, after seeing programmes featuring The Muppets and, his favourite, Rod Hull and Emu. Fletcher was given a replica puppet of Emu at the age of four and used it, and puppets made from card and paper, to make performances. His first public show was a performance of Aesop's "The Tortoise and the Hare" at his local church.

Fletcher attended All Saints Primary School and Mornington High School in Wigan. Whilst at school he was paid to perform at children's parties and founded his puppeteering company, Gluvets, in the break between primary and secondary school. Fletcher moved into making puppets from cloth and foam and retains the first puppet he made in this style, a blue creature named Josh. Fletcher studied design at Wigan and Leigh College for a year as there were no puppet-making classes available. He continued to make puppet performances whilst working on production lines at Ingersoll Rand and Alphason Design factories. After joining a number of talent agencies Fletcher found summer work at holiday resorts run by Butlins, Pontins and Haven Holidays and became a full-time puppeteer in 2002. In 2008 he judged Puppet Contest 2008 : A Space Odyssey, a competition organised by Project Puppet.

== Television ==
Fletcher never aspired to appear on television, as he thought it too small a market, and concentrated on live performances. He did put some of his performances on YouTube and was afterwards contacted by the BBC to audition for the role of Hacker T. Dog, an anthropomorphic Border Terrier dog puppet. Hacker had appeared in the television series Scoop from 2009 but was being brought in as a presenter sidekick and continuity announcer on the CBBC Channel for the following year. Fletcher initially declined to audition, stating he was too busy and the contract was short term (four months), but was persuaded to reconsider and was awarded the role. Fletcher has appeared as Hacker since then.

On Scoop Hacker had only growled and barked but he gained a voice under Fletcher, who gradually introduced more dialogue to the act. Hacker first appeared alongside CBBC presenter Iain Stirling, with Fletcher hidden on screen by a trolley, desk or couch. The performances were well received, with Stirling and Fletcher being nominated for a Bafta for best children's presenter in 2010. The Hacker character was given his own series Hacker Time which ran for 63 episodes and was nominated for eight Baftas, including best children's performer for Fletcher in 2013. The character has also appeared on breakfast news programming, Today at Wimbledon and Celebrity Mastermind (his specialist subject was The Pet Shop Boys). Fletcher says that the personality of Hacker is based on himself and that "I just do what I find funny ... The bits that are always the funny bits are just made up – I'm always just trying to throw the presenter under the bus, really. I have no regard for the presenter, I just throw them under the bus because I think it'd make good telly". Fletcher claims that portraying Hacker is "the best job in the world". He received a further Bafta nomination for best children's performer in 2017 for his work on the CBBC Channel.

In 2022 a segment that Hacker filmed with co-host Lauren Layfield in 2016 became a viral meme. A programme trailer featuring an interrogation scene preceded the segment. Fletcher told his sound operator not to play the usual background music during the segment and told Layfield to move her head close to the Hacker puppet. Fletcher had Hacker look into her eyes and say "We're just normal men". Layfield asked "What do you mean, normal men?" and Fletcher, as Hacker, replied "We're just innocent men". Layfield struggled to maintain composure through laughing and snorted loudly, described by the Big Issue as "the most famous snort in the country". Fletcher said "Her reaction was genuine because she didn't know what I was gonna say, nor did I, really. It just threw her over the edge, because what does that even mean? Why would you say that on kids telly?". The scene was unscripted. Although rumours arose claiming it was inspired by an interaction between Fletcher and the police after being arrested in Leeds he says it was not and was "just nonsense".

Fletcher's Gluvets company has made puppets for the Sooty TV series and replicas of famous puppets such as the Muppets, and Basil Brush, for his personal collection. From 2017 Fletcher provided the "voice" for Sweep on Sooty. He has also appeared as Larry the Lizard in the ITV sitcom Buffering (2021–) alongside Stirling who wrote and stars in the programme.

== Personal life ==
Fletcher has always lived in Hindley, except for his first two years at CBBC when he lived in London, and has two dogs. Fletcher also appears in a Pet Shop Boys tribute band, known as The Pound Shop Boys. As well as the band's hits he sings children's television themes and novelty chart hits.

In 2018, Fletcher purchased at auction one of the few surviving Emu puppets used by Rod Hull. He paid £8,860 for the puppet, well in excess of its £750–£1,000 estimate. The puppet joined others in his collection, such as George from Rainbow, Keith Harris' Orville the Duck, and Sooty and Sweep. Fletcher also performs alongside Ricardo Autobahn in the duo Pound Shop Boys, covering theme tunes to children's television programs in the style of Pet Shop Boys.
