= Lauren Layfield =

English radio and television personality

- Born: 1 December 1987 (age 38); Warwick, England
- Education: University of Salford; Leeds Trinity University; National Council for the Training of Journalists (NCTJ)
- Occupation: Television presenter
- Years active: 2014–present
- Spouse: Luke Beddows
- Children: 1

Lauren Layfield (born 1 December 1987) is an English television and radio presenter and journalist who has worked for CBBC, Capital FM and Radio 1.

== Early life ==
Lauren Layfield was born on 1 December 1987 in Warwick to a Guyanese mother who worked for the NHS and an English father from Manchester. Layfield graduated with a degree in English and creative writing from the University of Salford and a degree in Broadcast Journalism from Leeds Trinity University in 2010.

== Career ==
Layfield joined CBBC continuity in September 2015, at the end of the one-off TV special Hacker's Birthday Bash: 30 Years of Children's BBC, going on to co-host the BAFTA-winning design series The Dengineers with Mark Wright. In April 2017, Wright left and was replaced with Joe Tracini, whom Layfield continued to present with until her own departure in 2019.

In January 2016, she joined another children's television programme All Over the Place, co-hosting with Ed Petrie. She went on to make one appearance in the game show Ultimate Brain and four in the panel show The Dog Ate My Homework from 2019 to 2021. Layfield's television work continued, presenting for the Match of the Day spin-off show, Match of the Day Kickabout, as well as Morning Live and as a reporter on The One Show.

Layfield appeared as a contender on BBC's Celebrity Mastermind twice. She first competed in 2016, when her specialist subject was the Jurassic Park films and she finished in 3rd place. She returned in February 2024, when her specialist subject was the Arctic Monkeys and she finished in second place.

In 2022, a clip of Layfield and Hacker T. Dog presenting CBBC HQ, resurfaced and went viral. The original clip from 1 November 2016 featured Hacker deadpanning to Layfield "We're just normal men... We're just innocent men", which prompted Layfield to break character and laugh. While some assumed the clip had context before the exchange, Hacker's puppeteer Phil Fletcher later explained that there was none, and he had just ad-libbed the line to make Layfield laugh. However, Layfield wanted herself and Hacker to imitate the "ice stars" on the screen behind them by leaning in and smiling for the camera, to which Hacker replies "but we're not ice stars. We're just, we're just normal men."

Layfield began her radio career in July 2018, when she began covering weekend shows on Capital FM. She later presented Capital FM's Capital Early Breakfast show from 7 January 2019 until 29 September 2023. In November 2023, it was announced that Layfield would be joining BBC Radio 1 in January 2024, presenting the Friday morning Early Breakfast show throughout the month. In March 2024, it was announced that Layfield would join Radio 1 on a permanent basis from 7 April 2024, co-presenting the station's Life Hacks programme alongside Newsround's Shanequa Paris. In September 2026, it was announced as part of schedule changes to BBC Radio 1 that Lauren Layfield would solo present the show she previously hosted with Shanequa Paris as this gained an extra two hours of airtime now broadcast every Sunday from 16:00 - 19:00 on BBC Radio 1 with the show moving studios from Salford to Birmingham

As an author, Layfield has written for the Top of the Pops magazine. Her debut children's novel, Indi Raye is Totally Faking It was published in 2023.

== Personal life ==
Layfield is married to Luke Beddows, the writer and co-creator of Class Dismissed.

Throughout her career, Layfield has advocated for mental health discussion and wellbeing, giving talks to students and being an ambassador for the charity YoungMinds, the charity that she raised money for in her first appearance on Celebrity Mastermind.

== Filmography ==
Year	Title	Role	Notes
2014–2015	Whoops I Missed the Bus	Presenter	Unknown episodes
2014–2020	CBBC	Presenter	Continuity
2015–2019	The Dengineers	Co-presenter	With Mark Wright (2015–17) and Joe Tracini (2017–2019)
2016	Millie Inbetween	Presenter	Episode: "A Day in the Life of Millie Inbetween"
2016	Ultimate Brain	Contestant	1 episode
2016–2018	All Over the Place	Co-presenter	Series 6–8; 18 episodes
2016–2021	The Dog Ate My Homework	Panellist	4 episodes
2016, 2024	Celebrity Mastermind	Contestant	2 episodes
2017	Match of the Day	Reporter	Episode: 4 Nov 2017
2017–2022	The Playlist	Co-presenter	Unknown episodes
2018–2023	Capital FM	Presenter	Cover presenter & Early Breakfast presenter
2019–2021	The Dog Ate My Homework	Host	8 episodes
2022, 2026	The Weakest Link	Contestant	2 episodes
2022–2023	Junior Eurovision Song Contest	Co-commentator	With Hrvy (2022, 2023)
2023	Celebrity Bridge of Lies	Contestant	1 episode
2023	Game On!	Presenter	TV special
2024	Christmas University Challenge	Contestant	Episode: "Leeds Trinity v Nottingham"
2025	Ranked	Contestant	Mini-series; episode: "Radio 1 Edition"
2025	The Celebrity Inner Circle	Contestant	1 episode
