= Cel Spellman =

British actor and broadcaster (born 1995)

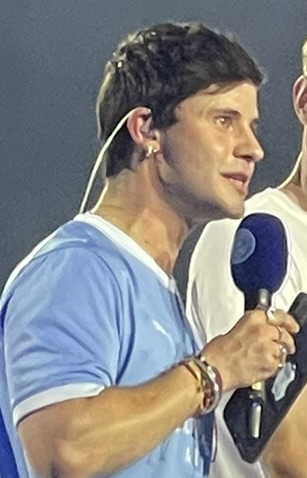
- Spellman in 2026
- Born: Ceallach John Spellman; 31 August 1995 (age 31); Manchester, England
- Occupations: Actor, writer, presenter
- Years active: 2003–present
- Known for: CBBC; BBC Radio 1 Waterloo Road (2010–2011); Friday Download (2011–2015); CBBC Official Chart Show; Cold Feet (2016–2020)

Ceallach John Spellman (/ˈkɛləx/ KEL-əkh; born 31 August 1995) is an English actor, writer and presenter best known for playing Matthew Williams in the revival of ITV drama Cold Feet, Harry Fisher in the BBC One school-based drama Waterloo Road from 2010 to 2011 and hosting Friday Download and various other programmes on CBBC. From July 2015 until August 2020, he presented his own show on BBC Radio 1, which aired every Sunday between 16:00 and 19:00 with his co-presenter Katie Thistleton. He is also known for his work as a presenter for Manchester City.

== Early life and education ==
Ceallach John Spellman (known as "Cel") was born on 31 August 1995. He is of Irish descent.

A Roman Catholic, he attended St Bede's College, Manchester. Subsequently, he attended Sylvia Young Theatre School from the age of 11.

== Career ==
Spellman played Harry Fisher in the BBC One school-based drama Waterloo Road from 2010 to 2011. In May 2011, he started presenting Friday Download on CBBC alongside Georgia Lock, Richard Wisker, Dani Harmer, Tyger Drew-Honey, Aidan Davis, and Dionne Bromfield.

From 19 July 2015, he started presenting his own show on Sunday afternoons on BBC Radio 1, with co-presenter Katie Thistleton.

In September 2016, he began starring as Matthew in the sixth series of British comedy-drama Cold Feet.

On 11 October 2016, it was announced that Spellman would be joining The Voice UK on ITV as social media reporter and online presenter of The V Room. On 15 November 2016, it was announced he would do the same for The Voice Kids UK.

In August 2020, it was announced that Spellman would be leaving his Sunday slots on Radio 1 at the end of that month to focus on his acting and broadcasting commitments. Vick Hope replaced Spellman, co-hosting Life Hacks and The Official Chart: First Look on Radio 1 from the beginning of September 2020.

In 2021, Spellman joined the advisory board of the international organization Awareness 360.

In 2023, he played Donal McHugh in the BBC One crime drama series Better. In September 2026, he played PC Callum Drummond alongside Michelle Keegan and Douglas Booth in ITV crime drama The Blame (TV series).

== Recognition ==
On 1 July 2016, he was rated as one of "50 Fittest Boys" by Vogue magazine. Spellman is one of nine presidents of Better Planet Education.

== Filmography ==
=== Film and television ===
Year	Title	Role	Channel	Notes
2003–2009	Blue Murder	Tom Lewis	ITV	19 episodes
2005	Holby City	Troy Dolan	BBC One	Episode: "Learning Curve"
2008	The Cup	Malky McConnell	BBC Two	Main role
2009	Casualty	Daniel	BBC One	Episode: "Watershed"
2010–2011	Waterloo Road	Harry Fisher	BBC One	Main role
2011–2015	Friday Download	Himself	CBBC	Presenter
2012–2014, 2017–2018	All Over The Place	Himself	CBBC	Co-presenter
2012–2016	CBBC	Himself	CBBC	Relief presenter
2012, 2015–2016	Hacker Time	Himself; Various	CBBC	Series regular
2012	Homefront	Sam	ITV	Series regular
2012	Jedward's Big Adventure	Himself	CBBC	Special guest
2012	Phineas and Ferb	The Hipster	Disney XD	Episode: "Sipping with the Enemy"
2013–present	How to be Epic @ Everything	Himself	CBBC	Voiceover
2013	Blue Peter: You Decide	Himself	CBBC	Judge
2014–2015, 2018	Sam & Mark's Big Friday Wind-Up	Himself	CBBC	Guest appearances
2014	The Dog Ate My Homework	Panelist	CBBC	1 episode
2015–2017	CBBC Official Chart Show	Himself	CBBC	Host
2015	At Home with Cel and Dodge	Himself	CBBC	5 episodes
2015	Closets	Ben	—N/a	Short film
2015	Cucumber	Adam Whitaker	Channel 4	Recurring role
2015	Drunk History	Scout	Comedy Central	1 episode
2015	Hacker's Birthday Bash: 30 Years of Children's BBC	Host	CBBC	One-off special
2016–2020	Cold Feet	Matt Williams	ITV	Recurring role
2016	Operation Ouch! Hospital Takeover Live	Himself	CBBC	Guest
2016	Hank Zipzer's Christmas Catastrophe	Radio DJ	CBBC	Television film
2016	Hacker's Crackers	Himself	CBBC	Television special
2017	The V Room	Himself	ITV Hub	Presenter
2017	Saturday Mash-Up!	Himself	CBBC	Guest
2019	Watchdog	Himself	BBC One	Presenter
2019	World on Fire	Joe Broughton	BBC One	Drama miniseries
2019	Festival of Remembrance	Himself	BBC One	Reading
2020	Thunderbirds Are Go	Announcer	CITV	Episode: "Icarus"
2020	White Lines	Young Marcus	Netflix	
2022	Kepler 62F	Dave		Short film
2023	Better	Donal McHugh	BBC One	
2024	Cheaters	Lars	BBC	Series 2
2025	The Bay	Bradley Dawson	ITV	Series 5
2025	Wolf King	Drew Ferran	Netflix	Voice; lead role; Executive producer
2025	Swim	Trustafarian		Short film
2026	The Trial	Charlie		Post production
2026	The Blame	PC Callum Drummond	ITV	
2026	Black Box	Asher		

=== Radio ===
Date	Title	Role	Director	Station
2011	Lost Property: The Year My Mother Went Missing	Vincent	Jessica Dromgoole	BBC Radio 4 Afternoon Play
2015–2020	Radio 1's Life Hacks and The Official First Look Chart with Katie Thistleton	Himself	—N/a	BBC Radio 1

=== Music videos ===
Year	Title	Artist	Notes
2015	"Rest Your Love"	The Vamps	
2018	"Forever and Ever More"	Nothing but Thieves	
