= Iain Stirling =

Scottish comedian and presenter (b. 1988)

- Stirling at the 2026 BAFTA Television Awards
- Born: Iain Andrew Stirling; 27 January 1988 (age 38); Edinburgh, Scotland
- Education: University of Edinburgh (LLB)
- Occupations: Comedian, presenter, voice over narrator
- Years active: 2007–present
- Spouse: Laura Whitmore (m. 2020)
- Children: 2

Iain Andrew Stirling (born 27 January 1988) is a Scottish comedian, writer, television presenter, narrator and Twitch streamer from Edinburgh, Scotland. He is best known for being the narrator of reality television series Love Island - where he narrates both the original British edition and, since 2022, the American edition.

== Career ==
=== Stand-up comedy ===
Stirling is a regular on the UK comedy circuit. He started stand-up whilst in his final year of Law at the University of Edinburgh, a year which saw him make the final of both the Paramount Funniest Student and Chortle Student Comedian of the Year competitions. Stirling was dubbed one of Scotland's 'Hottest Newcomers' by The Scotsman after his performance in front of 750 people at the Glasgow Fruitmarket. He now gigs all over the UK, including at The Stand (Edinburgh and Glasgow), The Comedy Store (Manchester and London), Off the Kerb and various smaller clubs.

In August 2009, Stirling performed in the final of the Chortle Student Comedian of the Year at the Edinburgh Fringe Festival, finishing runner-up to winner Joe Lycett.

Stirling's first stand-up special, Failing Upwards, was released on Amazon Prime Video on 26 May 2022.

=== CBBC ===
After being spotted at a gig, Stirling became the lead continuity presenter on the CBBC Channel along with his sidekick Hacker T Dog (originally from the CBBC TV show Scoop), as well as other presenters such as Chris Johnson and London Hughes. He left the channel in February 2013. He has also worked as a writer on a number of projects for the likes of CBBC and BBC Scotland, such as 12 Again and Help! My Supply Teacher's Magic. In early October 2013, Stirling began recording for a new series for CBBC, The Dog Ate My Homework, which was commissioned as the CBBC answer to Mock the Week. He was nominated for a BAFTA in 2014 for best children's presenter for his hosting of the programme for two series.

=== Love Island ===
In June 2015, Stirling became the narrator of the ITV2 reality series Love Island, and as of 2025 has contributed to every series of the show since its premiere, through Caroline Flack, Laura Whitmore and Maya Jama's tenures as presenter. His distinctive enunciated Scottish accent, comedic sarcasm within his writing and "mischievous presence" has garnered significant praise.

In 2022, for its fourth season, Stirling became the narrator of the American adaptation of the show, following its move to Peacock. He took over duties from Matthew Hoffman.

=== Other ===
In 2012, Stirling appeared on Russell Howard's Good News. In 2017, he began hosting the comedy game show CelebAbility. In February 2019, it was announced that Stirling would be a contestant on the eighth series of Taskmaster, finishing as the runner-up. He was also the host of the first programme on the BBC Scotland channel, A Night at the Theatre.

Buffering, a sitcom Stirling co-created with Steve Bugeja, aired on ITV2 in summer 2021, and ran for two series until 2023.

In 2022, Stirling and Laura Whitmore, his wife, began presenting the Spotify-exclusive podcast Partners In Crime, covering true crime stories and unsolved mysteries. In November 2023, the podcast moved to BBC Sounds under the name Murder They Wrote.

In April–May 2019, over six episodes, Stirling featured as one of the six comedians on the TV show Comedy Bus, in which each comedian took the others back to their home towns; Stirling took the group back to his native Edinburgh. On 19 November 2020, Stirling featured as a panellist on the ITV daytime show, Loose Women, and made history as being part of the show's first all-male panel in the show's 21-year history. Since June 2020, Stirling has appeared on Celebrity Gogglebox, alongside Whitmore.

In December 2025, Stirling won Celebrity MasterChef: Christmas Cook-Off; after beating GK Barry, Kola Bokinni, and Nikki Fox in the Christmas special.

Stirling is the host of the upcoming BBC competition series Race Against the Tide, which will premiere in August 2026.

In 2026, Stirling was announced as a contestant on the sixth season of The Traitors US alongside a cast of celebrities and reality TV personalities.

=== Internet ===
Stirling operates his own channel on Twitch, in which he interacts with viewers whilst playing video games such as FIFA. As of October 2021, his channel has grown to over 65,000 followers.

In February 2023, Stirling appeared in a video by the Sidemen called "The Roast of the Sidemen 2". Stirling appeared in another video by them in January 2024, called "Sidemen $100,000 Ultimate Hide & Seek", later titled "Sidemen vs 40 YouTubers Ultimate Hide & Seek in a Stadium".

== Personal life ==
In 2020, Stirling married presenter, model and actress Laura Whitmore in a humanist ceremony at Dublin City Hall. Their daughter was born in March 2021.
