= List of 4 O'Clock Club episodes =

4 O'Clock Club is a British children's television series, which premiered on 13 January 2012 on CBBC and BBC HD. A second series began airing on 4 January 2013, and the third series premiered on 20 December 2013. Series 4 began airing on 29 January 2015. A fifth series was commissioned, and was filmed between June 2015 and August 2015, and began airing on 25 February 2016.

A sixth series began airing on 2 March 2017, with it ending on 18 May 2017. A seventh series was commissioned and filmed in 2017, with it airing between January and April 2018. An eighth series began on 19 December 2018 with a Christmas special. On 29 December 2019 through to 5 January 2020, 3 episode Specials aired on CBBC and BBC iPlayer titled 'Flashbacks' which saw past and present cast members react to their favourite and funniest moments from the show. The Specials were filmed as part of a celebration of the show hitting its 100th episode milestone in Series 8. Series 9 began airing on 4 February 2020.

== Series overview ==
Series	Episodes	Originally released		Average UK viewers (millions)
Series	Episodes	First released	Last released	Average UK viewers (millions)
1	13	13 January 2012	30 March 2012	0.42
2	13	4 January 2013	22 March 2013	0.33
3	13	20 December 2013	26 March 2014	0.36
4	13	28 January 2015	22 April 2015	0.21
5	13	25 February 2016	19 May 2016	0.31
6	13	2 March 2017	25 May 2017	0.22
7	13	24 January 2018	18 April 2018	0.16
8	13	19 December 2018	17 April 2019 (BBC iPlayer); 24 April 2019 (TV)	TBA
9	13	4 February 2020	21 April 2020	TBA

== Specials ==
Series	Episodes	Originally released	
Series	Episodes	First released	Last released
Flashbacks		29 December 2019	5 January 2020

== Episodes ==
=== Series 1 (2012) ===
No. overall	No. in series	Title	Directed by	Written by	Original release date	UK viewers
1	1	"Back to School"	Matt Bloom	Paul Rose	13 January 2012	493,000
13-year-old Josh Carter (Khalil Madovi) is shocked and annoyed to discover that his older brother Nathan (Doc Brown) is the new English teacher and detention monitor at his school, Elmsbury High. As Nathan takes charge of the euphemistically-named 4 o'Clock Club (the nickname for the detention club), Josh, being the regular attendee and king of the club, desires to see his idol, B-Mode, at an event with his friends, dimwitted Ash Newman (Tom Rowlinson) and geeky Ryan Wood (Oscar Lloyd), but he must escape Nathan and his new ideas for the way of detention. Note: First appearance of Josh Carter, Nathan Carter, Liz Carter, Ashley 'Ash' Newman, Ryan Wood, Molly Finnegan, Zoe-Marie Ingham, Agness Addo, Mr Byron, Miss Melanie Poppy and Miss Anita Andress.
2	2	"Assembly"	Dermot Boyd	Paul Rose	20 January 2012	445,000
Having his brother Nathan as a teacher at his school is having a disastrous effect on Josh's ability to have fun, scheme schemes and scam scams. When Josh notices that Nathan is more than a little interested in music teacher Miss Poppy and her modern take on Cinderella, Josh tries to get him off his case by setting Nathan up as her Prince Charming. Note: First appearance of Darius Phillips.
3	3	"Maths"	Matt Bloom	Dan Berlinka	27 January 2012	488,000
To get out of maths homework Josh claims he has number blindness, and persuades novice supply teacher Janucek to let him off.
4	4	"Disco"	Dermot Boyd	Mark Oswin	3 February 2012	481,000
The school disco means just one thing for the Carter brothers – girl trouble. Josh accidentally invites Zoe-Marie to be his date, while Nathan tries desperately to impress the gorgeous Miss Poppy. Only Ash has any success with the girls – in fact, more success than he can handle.
5	5	"Laptop"	Matt Bloom	Paul Rose	10 February 2012	453,000
When Nathan's laptop mysteriously breaks down in the middle of a project, Josh is the obvious suspect. Josh suggests Nathan borrows a replacement from the terrifying Miss Andress. Note: First appearance of Mr Jameson.
6	6	"Party"	Dermot Boyd	Gerard Foster	17 February 2012	399,000
Nathan takes advantage of Mrs Carter's weekend trip away to invite Miss Poppy round for a romantic evening. Unfortunately, Josh has chosen the same evening to invite his entire class round for a party.
7	7	"Football"	Dermot Boyd	Mark Brotherhood	24 February 2012	499,000
Josh, Ryan and Ash sign up for the school football team to get out of lessons, but discover that even studying is preferable to PE teacher Thorne's strict disciplinary regime. Note: First appearance of Mr Jeff Thorne.
8	8	"Quiz"	Julie Edwards	Mark Oswin	2 March 2012	394,000
Nathan drags Josh onto the useless school quiz team to teach him how to stick at something. But Josh realizes to his delight that him not knowing any answers will only make Nathan look bad.
9	9	"Auction"	Dermot Boyd	Ben “Doc Brown” Smith	9 March 2012	460,000
When the school's last remaining keyboard blows a fuse, Josh decides to help raise funds for new musical instruments by staging a charity auction. But without any valuables to give to the cause, the teachers decide to sell themselves. But Josh opts to donate Nathan's stuff instead.
10	10	"School Council"	Matt Bloom	Andrew Jones and Ciaran Murtagh	16 March 2012	389,000
Nathan gets lumbered with running the School Council – and drags Josh in to teach him about responsibility. But instead, Josh uses his new powers to try to change the rules to his own advantage. Note: First appearance of Natalie Harlow.
11	11	"Sweets"	Julie Edwards	Holly Phillips	23 March 2012	473,000
Since Jamie Oliver's push for healthy school meals, sweets have been banned at Elmsbury High. But someone's running an unofficial tuck shop selling crisps and chocolate – and Nathan's given the job of finding out who.
12	12	"Fight"	Julie Edwards	Dan Berlinka	30 March 2012	277,000
When Nathan decides to put Darius, the star player of Elmsbury's basketball team, in detention, Darius decides to get his own back – on Josh.
13	13	"End of Term"	Julie Edwards	Paul Rose	30 March 2012	279,000
It's the end of term and Nathan is due to be assessed by Head Master Mr Byron. His future hangs in the balance. So when Josh messes up, and it looks like Nathan's career as a teacher is over, it's down to the rest of the 4 O'Clock Club to save his skin. Note: This series ended with a rap entitled Let's Enjoy this Moment Right Note: Last appearance of Mr Byron.

=== Series 2 (2013) ===
No. overall	No. in series	Title	Directed by	Written by	Original release date	UK viewers
14	1	"New Term"	Matt Bloom	Paul Rose	4 January 2013	441,000
After the end of the summer holidays, school at Elmsbury resumes for the Carter brothers, but they discover that Mr Byron has been replaced as headteacher by Crispin Bell, who has plans that could determine the fate of the 4 O'Clock Club and ultimately Elmsbury itself. Note: This is the first appearance of Layton Blake, although it is a simple guest appearance and his character does not yet have a name. This is also the first appearance of Mr Crispin Bell.
15	2	"Head Of Year"	Matt Bloom	Gerard Foster	11 January 2013	460,000
Nathan finally decides to ask Miss Poppy out, but it's on the day that Mr Bell is to select a head of year and Josh is determined that Nathan gets the post instead of Thorne. But Nathan is too distracted by a misunderstanding about the date, so Josh concocts a plan to help Nathan's bid for the job. But without Nathan's help, Josh has to turn to new music assistant Dexter for a solution. Note: First appearance of Dexter Harris.
16	3	"Dexter's Big Week"	Matt Bloom	Paul Rose	18 January 2013	N/A
When a heartbroken Nathan leaves Elmsbury to take up a post in Scotland, Mr Bell needs someone to run the 4 O'Clock Club. Dexter enthusiastically steps up, keen to prove himself to Mr Bell, but when Josh discovers that Dexter is also his mum's new lodger, he makes it his mission to take Dexter down. Note: This episode marks the last appearance of Nathan Carter as a series regular, but he does continue to appear as a recurring character.
17	4	"Ice Cream"	Matt Bloom	Mark Oswin	25 January 2013	410,000
Bell initiates a big clamp-down on security and truancy in school, meaning there are no more visits to the ice cream van just outside the front gates. But even worse for Josh, there's a game he wants to buy in a shop that is shut out of school hours. Note: First appearance of PC Emily Rowe.
18	5	"Dexter's Dad"	Dermot Boyd	Paul Rose	1 February 2013	401,000
Mr Bell has organised a conference bringing all headteachers from other schools, including Dexter's dad. But when Dexter ends up making a chain of lies, he turns to Josh for help.
19	6	"Points"	Dermot Boyd	Lee Walters	8 February 2013	322,000
Bell starts a scheme where good behaviour is rewarded with points that can be converted into prizes. Josh realises that with enough points he can 'buy' his dream tablet computer, so he tries to take advantage of the points scheme.
20	7	"Valentine's Day"	Matt Bloom	Gerard Foster	15 February 2013	314,000
Josh needs Dexter's help to finish off some new tracks – but doesn't want to look uncool by hanging out with a teacher. But Dexter has other ideas and plans to take this beautiful new musical partnership public. Note: First appearance of Rachel Crawford.
21	8	"School Trip"	Matt Bloom	Mark Oswin	22 February 2013	288,000
Dexter takes the 4 O'Clock regulars on a half-term camping trip. But due to a mix-up they have to turn back and head home. To salvage something from the trip, Josh comes up with a bold idea for where they can camp instead.
22	9	"Suspension"	Matt Bloom	Ben Smith	1 March 2013	N/A
Josh is suspended for a day. Unfortunately it is on school careers day, and a record label guy Josh is keen to impress will be there.
23	10	"Rights and Responsibilities"	Matt Bloom	Holly Phillips	8 March 2013	N/A
Dexter wants the pupils, learning, rights and responsibilities. He encourages them to make a video about the new scheme. Josh seeks this opportunity to shoot his own rap video, but when the whole thing collapses, Dexter is removed from the running of the club.
24	11	"Music Thief"	Dermot Boyd	Ben Smith	15 March 2013	N/A
Josh has written his best track ever and decides he's going to sell CDs of it in school. But when he realises he's sampled a famous track without permission he has to get all the CDs back before he's caught. Meanwhile, Dexter agrees to teach ukulele, but he doesn't know how to play it himself.
25	12	"Lockdown"	Dermot Boyd	Paul Rose	22 March 2013	354,000
When Dexter enforces the no-phones rule in the 4 O'Clock Club, Josh rebels and decides to test once and for all just who is in charge in detentions – the teachers or the pupils. Note: Nathan makes an appearance in this episode
26	13	"Project Zenith"	Matt Bloom	Paul Rose	22 March 2013	354,000
Dexter finds himself fronting Bell's new plan for Elmsbury – Project Zenith. But the plan has big, bad implications for the 4 o'Clock Club. Josh sets out to defeat the scheme, with a little help from his friends and family. Nathan and Melanie then share a kiss. Note: Guest appearance of Nathan Carter in this episode. Note: Last appearance of Mr Jeff Thorne, Note: This series ended with a rap entitled Never Been a Year Like this Before.

=== Series 3 (2013–14) ===
No. overall	No. in series	Title	Directed by	Written by	Original release date	UK viewers
27	1	"Christmas"	John Howlett	Paul Rose	20 December 2013	N/A
Josh helps Agness and her siblings with their Christmas problems, meanwhile the gang rebel against a Scrooge-like Bell's orders by spreading Christmas cheer around the school, and Nathan returns to surprise everyone by proposing to Mel. Note: Nathan Carter appears in this episode.
28	2	"Wedding"	John Howlett	Paul Rose	8 January 2014	317,000
Trouble arises on the day of Nathan and Mel's wedding as Josh squabbles with his younger cousin Nero, Zoe-Marie, Molly, and Agness are bridesmaids, and Dexter, Ash, and Ryan are in charge of organizing the school auditorium for the reception. Though after the wedding, Josh and the gang are given a huge surprise by Elmsbury. When the school burns to the ground... Note: Nathan Carter appears in this episode. Note: First appearance of Nero Johnson and Bebe Johnson. Note: Last appearance of Miss Melanie Poppy.
29	3	"Merger"	Tim Hopewell	Gerard Foster	15 January 2014	N/A
After Elmsbury burns down after the wedding, the gang (save for Ryan and Molly) arrive at their new school Fowlmere Manor, where they meet new faces. Meanwhile, Nero wreaks havoc – at Josh's expense, while Dexter tries to impress his new colleagues with a first aid demonstration and nearly scares his new pupils to death. Note: First appearance of Mr Graham Nunn, Isaac Rodgers, Eli Grant, Owen Garland, Fleur Murphy, Eleesha Rahaad, Miss Emma Parkwood and Mrs Aine O'Brien. Note: Last appearance of Ryan Wood and Molly Finnegan. This episode also sees Miss Anita Andress depart, although she returns later in the series.
30	4	"Cross Country"	John Howlett	Paul Rose	22 January 2014	N/A
Mrs O'Brien and Mr Bell announce that the school name will be renamed to Elmsmere Manor (which is the school name for the rest of the series.) After pretending to have run laps in P.E. class, Josh and the gang find themselves as members for Mr. Nunn's cross-country team. Meanwhile, suspicion is raised in the school when the new statue is destroyed, and Nero tries his hand at writing a new school anthem. Note: Last appearances of Darius Phillips and Mr Jameson.
31	5	"Bench"	John Howlett	Mark Oswin	29 January 2014	N/A
Nero accidentally loses £60 of Josh's money which Mr Bell spends on a bench. Nero and Josh have to work together to get the money back – or get revenge.
32	6	"Choir"	Tim Hopewell	Madeleine Brettingham	5 February 2014	376,000
When Dexter starts a choir, Josh rejects it as a "lame" pursuit, but reconsiders when Rachel joins. But when Josh discovers the true boring nature of the choir, he quits, leading to the other members to quit. Meanwhile, Fleur and Eleesha accidentally manage to become the first girls on Mr. Nunn's boys' boxing team, which they try to get exiled from.
33	7	"Mugs"	Tim Hopewell	Julia Kent	12 February 2014	423,000
Josh skips school to go to an all-day music conference, but he discovers that Parkwood has also attended the event. Meanwhile, Nero, Eli and Owen attempt to create a new online viral, "mugs", to rival "planking", but it manages to cause them problems.
34	8	"Work Experience"	Spencer Campbell	Gerard Foster	19 February 2014	327,000
When the 4 O'Clock Club gang fail to set up work experience placements, they are given jobs in the school. But If this lot are lousy pupils they are absolutely terrible teachers.
35	9	"Radio"	Tim Hopewell	Ben Smith	26 February 2014	N/A
When Josh discovers some old radio equipment at school, he persuades Dexter to run a pupil run radio station. Josh is planning to run a radio station to make himself a star and get a date with Rachel – but he hasn't bargained for the other 4 O'Clockers getting involved...
36	10	"Gold"	Spencer Campbell	Madeleine Brettingham	5 March 2014	303,000
Dexter gets the 4 o'Clock Club digging the school allotment. But boredom with broccoli turns to delight when Josh strikes gold. Meanwhile, Nero joins Owen at scouts and discovers that under the uniforms those guys may not be as silly as they look.
37	11	"Quiche"	Spencer Campbell	Mark Oswin	12 March 2014	N/A
Josh's plans to invite Rachel to a music festival are threatened, when his one hope, Natalie, has promised his ticket to Nero, so the cousins compete against each other in culinary activity to raise enough money to purchase the ticket. Note: Last Appearance of Rachel Crawford.
38	12	"Prefects"	John Howlett	Gerard Foster	19 March 2014	N/A
Josh wants to put a gig on at a village hall. But when Mum refuses to sign the booking form, Josh takes matters into his own hands. Meanwhile, Mr Bell's scheme to create school prefects doesn't go as smoothly as he hoped.
39	13	"Audition"	Spencer Campbell	Paul Rose	26 March 2014	N/A
When Josh plans to audition for a spot at Hillview Institute, a music academy, his dream is thwarted when he discovers that he needs a perfect academic record. It could also mean that his days at Elmsmere Manor and the 4 O'Clock Club are numbered. Meanwhile, Nero, Ash and the gang are chosen to review Bell and O'Brien, which leads to a disastrous surprise that gets Bell demoted, O'Brien fired, and Miss Andress promoted as Elmsmere's new headteacher. Note: This series ended with a rap entitled Forever Note: Last appearance of Natalie Harlow, Bebe Johnson, Miss Emma Parkwood and Miss Aine O'Brien.

=== Series 4 (2015) ===
No. overall	No. in series	Title	Directed by	Written by	Original release date	UK viewers
40	1	"Ghost"	Tim Hopewell	Paul Rose	28 January 2015	217,000
After Josh has left for his new school and Bebe has left the country with her husband, school resumes at Elmsmere, and Nero tries to impress Clem, the new girl, by sneaking into the school to search for ghosts. Note: This episode marks the last appearance of Josh Carter, Ashley 'Ash' Newman, Zoe-Marie Ingham and Agness Addo as series regulars, but they do continue to make guest appearances. Note: First appearance of Clem Burton
41	2	"Toads"	Alex Jacob	Paul Rose	4 February 2015	200,000
When Nero accidentally loses the school's pet toads, he manages to set of a chain of events that lead Dexter to quit his job as the detention monitor, so he and the gang stage a protest to get Dexter back and save the toads from ending up in a laboratory.
42	3	"Theatre"	Tim Hopewell	Paul Rose	11 February 2015	200,000
Dexter organizes a school theatre trip (mixed with music and science) to impress Lizzie, but nobody joins, so Nero, in order to see a rap star at the event, manages to convince Eli, Owen, Fleur, Eleesha, Clem, and others to join, but disaster strikes when Nero and the gang are given detention. Meanwhile, an anonymous student is spray-painting bad rumours about Miss Andress, who is on the search. Note: First appearance of Isobel Harlow.
43	4	"Bike"	Alex Jacob	Mark Oswin	18 February 2015	217,000
Nero receives a new bike as a present from his parents, but when he and Dexter are involved in the destruction of Clem's BMX, Clem retaliates by stealing Nero's bike. Meanwhile, Dexter's lottery ticket manages to cause him a mishap, while Eleesha learns how to ride a bike, with the help of Fleur and Elmsmere's new program of bike safety.
44	5	"Poem"	Alex Jacob	Mark Oswin	25 February 2015	204,000
When Nero discovers Clem's secret book of angry poems, his attempts to return it to its usual location make matters worse when he is forced to read it at Elmsmere's school fair.
45	6	"Sick"	Tim Hopewell	Julia Kent	4 March 2015	N/A
When Nero accidentally sleeps in at the last hour before the day his ICT project is due, he attempts to avoid detention by feigning illness, with help from Eli, Owen and Clem. Meanwhile, an actually ill Bell needs to mark his pupils' History exercise books, and Dexter fears that Lizzie may actually like Nunn romantically, so tries to manipulate Nunn into taking Lizzie on another date.
46	7	"Time Capsule"	Tim Hopewell	Paul Rose	11 March 2015	N/A
After Dexter agrees to chaperone Nero at Elmsmere's parents' evening and assigns the gang more homework, Nero and the gang devise a plan to retaliate on Dexter by sabotaging parents' evening. Meanwhile, Josh and Nathan returns with his newborn son Moses to let Mel relax at home, but he reveals a secret about the missing and unknown Mr. Carter that leads to Josh although Josh never saw his father, with Issac's help, attempting to find the crucial element that was handed to Nathan by their father. Note: Guest appearances of Nathan and Josh Carter in this episode.
47	8	"Netball"	Tim Hopewell	Madeleine Brettingham	18 March 2015	233,000
After Bell assigns litter-pick duty as after-school detention, Nero persuades Andress to let netball club as detention, knowing little that Nunn is the coach, who manages to get Elmsmere playing against a Catholic school called St. Millicent's Convent. Meanwhile, Dexter, trying to impress Lizzie, agrees to replace Nunn as coach, and Fleur and Eleesha attempt to write a story for the school newspaper, with disastrous consequences.
48	9	"Mobile"	Alex Jacob	Mark Blakewill and James Harris	25 March 2015	216,000
When Nero discovers he is about to get an upcoming call from his overseas father, he accidentally manages to get his phone confiscated by Andress, and he and Dexter attempt to retrieve it, with disastrous results. Meanwhile, Dexter competes with Nunn in a contest to find Lizzie's missing green pen, and Eleesha believes she has psychic powers.
49	10	"Party"	Tim Hopewell	Julia Kent	1 April 2015	249,000
When Nero is invited to popular Martin Thompson's party to act as DJ, he borrows Elmsmere's decks and accidentally destroys them, landing Martin in trouble. Meanwhile, Owen, Clem and Isobel Harlow (a recurring character who has appeared in Theatre, Poem and Netball) all run for the role of class president. Owen wins, although he finds that the job is completely futile. Fleur and Eleesha accidentally eat Nunn's doughnut holes, and must replace them in order to save themselves.
50	11	"Science"	Alex Jacob	Gerard Foster	8 April 2015	N/A
When Nero tries to practice for his audition for a dance club, he inadvertently manages to get himself, Clem, Fleur and Eleesha into Dexter's recorder club while trying to acquire the music room for practice. Meanwhile, Eli causes chaos when he and Owen join Lizzie's lunchtime science club, and Clem attempts to rebel against Andress.
51	12	"Health and Safety"	Tim Hopewell	Paul Rose	15 April 2015	175,000
After Nero and Eli manipulate Dexter to avoid cross-country for P.E. by helping clean the store room, Nero injures his foot, and retaliates to Dexter (who angrily berated him at the hospital for scattering the store room) by convincing him that the injury was major and he was the cause of it, leading to Elmsmere put on a health-and-safety background. Meanwhile, Owen becomes the assistant to the librarian and discovers a scouting book, and Clem, Fleur and Eleesha manipulate Eli into believing he was once a baby model.
52	13	"Runaway"	Tim Hopewell	Paul Rose	22 April 2015	190,000
As the end of term approaches at Elmsmere, fearing copyright issues, Andress forces Dexter to cancel his musical Harry Potter parody (entitled Hip-Hop Harry Potter), replaced by a new musical entitled Hip-Hop Henry Porter, angering the pupils. To add more disappointment to the situation, Nero discovers his parents are unable to attend the musical, so, tired of being let down by them continuously, he runs away with Clem from Elmsmere to try to find them in Kuwait. Dexter soon discovers that Nero has run away, and enlists the help of Nathan, Josh, Ash, Agness and Zoe-Marie to find him. Meanwhile, Isaac discovers that Bell is the mystery "phantom sprayer" who has been graffiting insults about Andress all over Elmsmere (a running gag throughout the fourth series). To this, Bell fears he will be fired, so he resigns his job to work at a cafe. Dexter, Josh, Nathan and Bell find Nero and Clem, and return them to Elmsmere. Bell is praised for finding Nero and is given his job back at Elmsmere. Note: Last appearance of Mrs Anita Andress. Note: Agness Addo, Zoe Marie Ingham, Ashley 'Ash' Newman, Nathan and Josh Carter guest appears in this episode. Note: Last appearance of Agness Addo, Nathan and Josh Carter. Note: This series ended with a rap entitled Never Alone

=== Series 5 (2016) ===
No. overall	No. in series	Title	Directed by	Written by	Original release date	UK viewers
53	1	"Leaving"	Alex Jacob	Paul Rose	25 February 2016	201,000
School resumes at Elmsmere, and Nero discovers he and his aunt Liz are moving to Scotland to assist Nathan and his family. He arrives to update his friends, but makes matters worse by quarreling with Clem after she accuses him of succumbing to adult tyranny (contradictorily, she has a slight crush on him). Mrs Goodman becomes the new headteacher and Mr Bell becomes deputy. Mrs Goodman believes more about motivation rather than punishment, and detention is taken over for one session by Mr Bell. Lizzie's younger sister, Amber, ends up in Mr. Bell's detention as well as her friends Violet and Darnesh. Under Mrs Goodman's new disciplinary rules, Mr Bell takes Amber and her friends to Chickentastic. Amber learns to not end up in detention again, to avoid a day out with a teacher. Dexter and Lizzie have begun dating, but are forced to keep their relationship confidential to their colleagues, while Dexter attempts to find courage to ask her to move in with him. Zoe-Marie's younger sister Ingrid begins her journey at Elmsmere and Zoe-Marie takes her to school, telling Ingrid to behave herself. Ingrid replies back saying that her sister was "one of the bad kids". Ingrid is embarrassingly sent off by Zoe-Marie. Nero fears he may be forgotten by his friends and attempts to "make his mark" on Elmsmere. His friends attempt to stop him, but they arrive late as Nero graffiti's his name across the school playground. Nero leaves in a taxi with his auntie and Issac is seen spraying the graffiti away. Note: First appearance of Amber Baker, Darnesh, Violet, Ingrid Ingham and Mrs Helena Goodman. Note: Zoe-Marie makes a guest appearance in the episode. Note: Last appearance of Liz Carter.
54	2	"Ferret"	Alex Jacob	Paul Rose	3 March 2016	245,000
Nero is back at Elmsmere but only for two days. So he decides to enter a talent competition, but makes a mistake trying to get Eli, Owen, Eleesha and Fleur to be his backing dancers. Issac brings a ferret to school but Dexter causes chaos with it after not shutting the cage door properly. Meanwhile, Nero asks Clem to enter the competition with him but they're too late. Amber cheats at a science exam getting 100%, which leads her to the 'Gifted and Talented Group' at lunch times. She finally admits she cheated. At the competition centre Clem and Nero say their goodbyes and Nero accidentally asks Clem to come with leaving her surprised but Dexter comes and picks Nero up leaving Clem by herself. Dexter then announces that Nero will be coming to live with him.
55	3	"Swimming"	Tim Hopewell	Mark Oswin	10 March 2016	228,000
Nero is now living with Dexter but Dexter cannot cope with looking after Nero as well as doing school work marking. After falling asleep in class, Clem is forced to tell Miss Baker about her before school swimming lessons that make her tired. Nero eventually also finds out about the swimming lessons, and laughs, threatening to tell everyone at school. This leads Clem to force Nero to sign up, only to feel embarrassed when he finds out it is an all-girls swimming club. Lizzie wants Dexter to meet her parents for the first time and he must rehearse a piano piece for them. He misses the dinner after falling asleep. And Amber wants revenge after Ingrid gets her into trouble.
56	4	"Hot Tub"	Tim Hopewell	Mark Blakewill & James Harris	17 March 2016	233,000
Dexter wants to take Lizzie on a romantic weekend away, which means Nero must go on the school camping trip. However, Nero doesn't want to go until he hears what Clem, Eleesha and Fleur are planning - to go to a live gig just down the road from the campsite. When Dexter lends Nero his tent, Nero is unhappy with its condition and demands a new one. But Dexter cannot afford it. Meanwhile, Mr Nunn offers a helping hand to get Dexter's car fixed, so Dexter accepts the offer to get the money for Nero's tent, with Nero being unaware that Dexter is getting it for him. Lizzie gets the wrong end of the stick when Dexter describes his car as 'falling apart' and 'not going anywhere', making Lizzie believe he is talking about her. Nero cleans all the staff cars to get the money for a new tent. When Mr Nunn is sent to hospital following a crash, Lizzie offers to do the camping trip which means Dexter must take Nero to the hot tub hotel. Note: Ashley Newman makes a guest appearance in this episode.
57	5	"Zombie"	Alex Jacob	Paul Rose	24 March 2016	N/A
It's Clem's birthday so the gang decides to go to a zombie apocalypse as a surprise but, Nero knows that Dexter isn't going to let him. Therefore, Nero lies about going to the cinema so he can go to a zombie apocalypse with his friends. At school, Nero and Dexter get their envelopes mixed up and picks up the wrong envelope. Nero accidentally gives Clem a CD of love songs which are actually Dexter's for Lizzie and Dexter accidentally gives Lizzie a leaflet to a zombie apocalypse which is actually Nero's for Clem. Clem is confused at the songs when she listens to them, and she wants Owen to tell Nero she already has a boyfriend to stop him from asking her out. However, Owen believes she wants him to ask her out. At the zombie apocalypse, Nero slips and injures his ankle, leaving Clem to aid him. They sit together on the floor and Nero wants Clem to be his girlfriend but Clem rejects him but deep down, she really wants to be. Together they go back to the others and leaves. Eli sees Lizzie dressed as a zombie and believes she is one of the zombie's and throws her to the floor.
58	6	"Courtroom"	Alex Jacob	Joe Williams	31 March 2016	N/A
After flying a drone into Amber, Nero is punished with a dancing ban, after Mrs Goodman sets up a student courtroom, causing inconvenience to his and Clem's dance routine. Meanwhile, Lizzie wants to celebrate her and Dexter's 4 month anniversary but Dexter is too busy trying to impress her with Mr Nunn. Clem warns Nero that she is doing the dance video with or without him, so Nero desperately tries to get Amber, Violet, Darnesh and Mr Bell to drop his punishment. After succeeding, Nero is set free and he is able to do the video with Clem.
59	7	"Removal"	Tim Hopewell	Madeleine Brettingham	7 April 2016	241,000
Mr Bell is moving into a new flat and Dexter, Nero, Eli and Owen help him. Eventually, Bell finds out he is in the wrong flat. Amber enters a fashion show but her posters make her look ugly so she takes them down with the help of Violet and Darnesh. Meanwhile, Nunn and Isaac swap jobs for a day but they soon go into competition over whose better at each others job. After assuming Mr Nunn finds caretaking too hard, Mrs Goodman helps him over come his 'paranoia'. Amber is embarrassed when her poster is put on the side of a bus. Meanwhile, Lizzie goes to Dexter's flat to prepare their romantic meal but after the flat confusion, Bell needs somewhere to stay and either Dexter or Nero needs to lend him their room.
60	8	"Social Worker"	Tim Hopewell	Julia Kent	14 April 2016	208,000
The students of Elmsmere protest against Nunn's football sexism stopping the girls playing it. Mr Bell is online dating but Clem, Fleur and Eleesha find out and take the mick. Meanwhile, a social worker comes to visit Dexter and Nero but Nero lies to protect Dexter. A home visit gets Bell confused into thinking Shona is his date. Dexter pretends to be Scottish, Lizzie pretends to be a plumber, Shona assumes Dexter and Crispin are a couple and Nero pretends to be a cheerleader. Nunn puts all the girls on a cheerleading team and Owen must be the leader. Nero comes clean that he lied about having the perfect home life but Shona understands and agrees to allow Nero to stay with Dexter.
61	9	"Babysitting"	Tim Hopewell	Paul Rose	21 April 2016	206,000
Nero is made to look after Amber whilst Lizzie is at a staff training course at the school. Meanwhile, Nero takes Amber and her friends to the cinema when his friends are going too. Amber winds Nero up too much which causes him to flip at her. Meanwhile, Dexter tries to show that he doesn't always hate losing and teams up with Bell and Isaac for the staff training.
62	10	"Cardigan"	Tim Hopewell	Paul Rose	28 April 2016	181,000
Mr Bell is up for the position of deputy head, but Nero doesn't want him to be. So he figures that the next best candidate could be Dexter. Meanwhile, Lizzie receives a strange gift of a cardigan from Dexter, but she clearly does not like it. When Amber and her friends see it, they start to mock it. Eli and Owen want people's old things to sell to see who is the better scout but they take it too far, leading to Owen taking off nearly all his clothes. To impress Mrs Goodman, Bell pretends to speak fluent Italian, but soon finds himself in a bad situation both at school and in an Italian restaurant.
63	11	"Date"	Alex Jacob	Mark Oswin	5 May 2016	213,000
Clem has never had a valentine. Eli, Owen, Eleesha and Fleur can tell she wants one from Nero. Meanwhile, Dexter, Nunn, Lizzie and PC Rowe are all on the same date. Amber, Violet and Darnesh play cupid but are soon caught sending fake cards. When Clem doesn't suspect Nero has sent her a card, Eli is sent on a date with her. On the way home, Clem sees Nero waiting for her. Nero tells Clem it wasn't Eli who sent the card, she says it was Darnesh but deep down she knows it was Nero.
64	12	"Flower"	Tim Hopewell	Mark Oswin	12 May 2016	206,000
Mrs Goodman discovers a rare flower on Nunn's football pitch which means she does not allow his football match to go ahead. When Clem, Eleesha and Fleur accidentally knock a metal fence onto it, the flower gets crushed - but they blame Nunn so they don't get into trouble for it. Meanwhile, Amber wants Nero to teach her ballroom dancing but Bell catches them and believes that they are fighting. They are then embarrassed in front of the whole school when Goodman calls them up in assembly to make peace with each other. However, when Ingrid comes over and interrogates Amber, she thinks Amber is asking for a fight and gets Zoe-Marie in to fight Amber. Nero helps Amber out when he sees her upset about it but he ends up in hospital with another sprained wrist. Meanwhile, Dexter wants to take Lizzie to Paris for the weekend but he accidentally drops her phone in her coffee, so he tries to dry it in the oven - only to then find out it was Eleesha's phone. Note: Zoe Marie Ingham guest appears in this episode.
65	13	"Triangle"	Tim Hopewell	Madeleine Brettingham	19 May 2016	189,000
Nero asks Katie to the school dance to cover the fact that he was going to ask Clem. Meanwhile, Nunn, Dexter, Lizzie, Goodman and Bell start an end of term school band. At the dance, Clem and Eleesha arrive in a pink limo, and Nero is stunned by the way Clem is dressed. Katie dumps Nero in front of the whole school after she realizes he doesn't really want to be at the dance with her. Clem is also dumped by a Shakespeare obsessed freak. Clem wants to leave but Nero stops her and asks her to go back to the dance with him to stop Dexter and Lizzie making a fool of themselves but really wants to ask her to dance however stops. Note: First appearance of Katie Turnbull. Note: This series ended with a rap entitled Mates are What Matter

=== Series 6 (2017) ===
No. overall	No. in series	Title	Directed by	Written by	Original release date	UK viewers
66	1	"Antenatal"	Tim Hopewell	Julia Kent	2 March 2017	147,000
It's a new term and Nero and Clem are finally together. Meanwhile, Dexter and Lizzie are expecting a baby but Mr Nunn isn't happy when he has to cover their lessons whilst they go to an antenatal class. Amber, Violet and Darnesh try to convince Nunn that you can stick someone to the ceiling via static electricity. At the antenatal class, Dexter and Lizzie see Ash and Zoe-Marie who are also expecting a baby together. Clem, Eleesha, Fleur and Owen's new girlfriend Katie go to a poetry convention but they get bored and go to Nero's party instead. However, Clem believes she and Nero are better off as friends and they break up. Note: Guest appearanced of Ashley Newman and Zoe Marie Ingham. Note: Last appearance of Ashley Newman.
67	2	"Pass"	Alex Jacob	Mark Oswin	9 March 2017	N/A
Clem has an advert to film so she lies to Mr Bell about having a dentist appointment to get an authorised absence pass. However when Nero catches wind of this, he wants in on it too. Meanwhile, Owen has a new gate duty job to report all the late students. But he is unhappy when Katie joins him on the job and admits to Eli that she's becoming too much for him. Clem and Nero still clearly have feelings for each other but are too scared to admit it to each other. Amber steals the authorisation passes to allow students to leave. Nero takes over Owen's new job and allows Clem to leave for her advert. She arrives but is horrified it is an advert for Chickentastic and she has to dress up like a chicken nugget.
68	3	"Karaoke"	Alex Jacob	Paul Rose	16 March 2017	N/A
Clem is not happy when people mock her over the chicken advert. When she gets invited to Eleesha's birthday karaoke she fears that they will take the mock out of her. Meanwhile, Amber convinces Ingrid that her uncle is an astronaut and they video call Darnesh who is pretending to be Amber's uncle. At the karaoke, Clem is heard singing by a manager and calls her for a demo which causes Nero to become jealous. He discovers the manager is a conman so he gets B-Mode to help Clem get her big break. It works and Clem leaves Elmsmere. Note: Last regular appearance of Clemetine Burton. Note: B-Mode appears in this episode. Note: Last appearance of B-Mode.
69	4	"Baby"	Tim Hopewell	Paul Rose	23 March 2017	N/A
Lizzie walks out on Dexter when they find Nero, Eli and Owen treating the birthing pool like a paddling pool. Nero and Dexter have an argument and Nero sings a rap about having no family and also wants to apologise for what he said. At school, Lizzie teaches the class about human reproduction and the class are disgusted by the facts. However Lizzie falls into labour during the lesson. Mr Nunn drives her and Amber to the hospital where they find out it was a false alarm. But when they return to school, Lizzie goes into labour for real but no one believes it until her water breaks. Dexter and everyone who was on the school trip rush back to school where Dexter and Lizzie's baby is born. But it turns out they're having twins. Note: First appearances of Albert and Faraday Baker-Harris.
70	5	"Volcano"	Alex Jacob	Paul Rose	23 March 2017 (BBC iPlayer) 30 March 2017(TV)	N/A
New boy Chester manages to get out of PE to sort out the library, meaning Amber, Violet, Darnesh and Ingrid want to join him to also get out of PE. Meanwhile, Nero takes credit for Owen's science project and Miss Higgins, the new science teacher, moves him to a higher set. At the class, Nero meets stubborn girl, Polly who hates the fact he will be representative at the volcano fair instead of her. Owen is jealous that he isn't in the higher set. A caravan has been dumped in the car park but it turns out Mr Bell is living in it. The caravan gets towed away with everyone unaware Mr Bell is still inside. Nero tries to focus on the science books but he gets bored and falls asleep. However Owen suggests that he turns it into a rap. Mr Bell reveals Anastasia has left him and he has nothing left. Nero decides to make the volcano experiment more exciting by making it 'explode'. Note: First appearances of Miss Aliyah Higgins, Polly Morgan and Chester Garland.
71	6	"Rash"	Emma Sullivan	Julia Kent	30 March 2017 (BBC iPlayer) 6 April 2017 (TV)	N/A
Owen has transformed his garage into his bedroom after he gets fed up of sharing with his brother. Nobody realizes he has a brother until Chester enters the garage. Everyone is shocked that he is Owen's brother. Nero and Eli bring a second-hand sofa into the garage but Owen does not like it. Meanwhile, Dexter and Lizzie have finally decided to name the twins Albert and Faraday, but Dexter has trouble getting them registered when he cannot tell them apart. He is embarrassed to tell Lizzie so he tells Nero instead. Nero suggests that he has Albert on the left at all times, a bit like Ant and Dec. Nero develops a mysterious itch and he is too embarrassed to tell Polly, of whom he is working on a history project with. Fleur suggests to get some cream from the chemist and it works. But Eli has sent Nero's photo of the affected area around the school and Mr Nunn is on the case. Lizzie tells Dexter she cannot tell the twins apart so Dexter finally owns up about his troubles too. But they keep getting them mixed up when Amber cleans the bib which had a red stain on it, which Dexter was using to tell which one was which. Nero moves out of the flat and moves in with Owen to give Dexter and Lizzie the space they need with the twins. Note: First appearance of Mrs Morgan.
72	7	"Chair"	Tim Hopewell	Mark Oswin	6 April 2017	155,000
Dexter and Nero find Mr Bell's old books in a box in a skip that he wrote many years ago. Mr Bell also takes his old massage chair back to the caravan from his ex-wife's house. However, whilst he is there, Crispin Junior, known as CJ, appears and Dexter and Nero are shocked when they find out that CJ is Bell's son. On the way back to the school, a book falls out of the box and a 'Head Hunter' lady picks it up. The following day, she phones Mr Bell and asks to come and see him in action, unaware that the book was written many years ago and he is in fact no longer a head teacher. CJ turns up at the caravan and says that he has been told to live with his father. Nero and Polly enter a festival, but Dexter tells them it is off when Lizzie organizes her return to work schedule and Dexter must look after the twins on the date the festival is on. CJ causes trouble around the school and Amber, Darnesh and Violet try to keep him out of it. Nero and Polly break into the school office and mess around but they accidentally destroy the office. CJ decides to act cool and admit he did it to Amber, Violet and Darnesh but Mr Nunn overhears and takes him to the head's office. Nero turns the massage chair on in the office and everyone gets away with it, after the chair is seen as the culprit. Note: First appearance of Crispin Junior Bell.
73	8	"Gig"	Alex Jacob	Madeleine Brettingham	13 April 2017	254,000
Eli has got a job as a backstage crew member at a gig. Nero sees this as a chance to take Polly to see her favourite band, however Nero doesn't really have tickets. He asks Eli to get him and Polly tickets to see The Splutters. Meanwhile, Ingrid pushes Darnesh, causing his glasses to fall on the floor and break. Darnesh can't see anything, so he, Amber and Violet take his glasses to Isaac to be fixed. Mr Bell is invited to a day out for parents and when Mr Nunn sees that he can hang out with a load of mums, he asks Owen to pretend to be his son so that he can go too. Bell uses the day out as an opportunity to bond with CJ, but this backfires when he is locked in the toilet of the coach by CJ for the duration of the trip. Darnesh has a date but is horrified to discover that his date in Ingrid – they did not know it was each other. Ingrid didn't recognize him without his glasses and he couldn't see her at all. Mr Nunn gets annoyed when Owen beats him at golf. Nero is horrified when Eli tells him that he lied to the band so that they could be VIPs. The band think that Polly is dying and when they meet her, they ask her to join them onstage. However, when Nero and Polly go on stage, the lead singer tells everyone about how Polly is 'dying' but when Polly tells the truth, she, Nero and Eli get kicked out. Once again, Polly blames Nero and Nero is angry with Eli.
74	9	"Funeral"	Alex Jacob	Julia Kent	20 April 2017	223,000
Owen is ordered by Nunn to take part in the high jump at sports day in the afternoon. However he does not want to do it. Nero suggests he skives so he does. Nero writes a fake note for Owen to give to Nunn saying that Owen has to go to his great uncle's funeral. But it backfires when Nunn wants a photo of him by the coffin. Meanwhile, Amber trucks the class into eating the school goldfish by eating a carrot but when the fish goes missing, everyone accuses Amber of eating it. It later turns out Isaac took it to clean the tank. Nero, Eli and Owen gate crash a funeral but it turns out it is Polly's dad's uncle who has died. At the wake, Nunn turns up and accidentally walks in on everyone mourning after he doesn't believe that there is a funeral.
75	10	"Flashmob"	Emma Sullivan	Frog Stone	27 April 2017	162,000
The whole school is gearing up for a dance flashmob, and Nero is excited to ask Polly to pair up with him. However when she wants him to teach her to dance, he realises she has two left feet. Stuck without a partner, he has no choice but to ask Katie. When practicing with Katie, Nero realises he may have feelings for her as well as Polly and not wanting to let either of them down, he tries to keep them apart as he practices with Katie and helps Polly with her dancing. When Nero bumps into them both at the flashmob, he fakes being ill in an attempt to call the whole thing off, but this only results in him being caught out by both girls, and when they both join in the dancing, Nero isn't allowed to. Meanwhile Bell is put out when CJ would rather be with Amber, Violet and Darnesh joining in the flashmob than spend quality time with him. After a chat with Mrs Goodman, Bell thinks holding his son against his will to fix a broken school trophy will help mend their relationship, but this only makes CJ dislike him more. Eventually, Bell comes to the realisation that CJ should be allowed to spend time with his friends as well as him.
76	11	"Paperboy"	Emma Sullivan	Paul Rose	4 May 2017	N/A
Nero and Dexter are doing Owen's paper round which is being supervised by Chester. However, when they deliver a paper to Mrs Goodman's house, Dexter posts the wrong one and tries to get it back by sticking his hand through the letter box. But it doesn't work. So him and Nero climb in through a window at the side of the house to swap the paper. Chester is worried about getting caught and does not want to go with them. But he eventually gives in and follows. Meanwhile, Isaac is awarded a new motorized floor cleaner by Mrs Goodman after his services to the school. Amber wants to have a go so Darnesh causes a distraction to Isaac for Amber. But Amber's behavior leads to Mr Nunn complaining about the motorized floor cleaner and Isaac is suspended. Amber feels guilty. The alarm in Mrs Goodman's home goes off so Nero, Dexter and Chester try and find a way out. But they're caught by Mrs Goodman who had a notification through on her phone saying her alarm went off. Amber tries to get Isaac back by formally complaining about Mr Nunn after he causes a door to fall on Darnesh.
77	12	"Camping"	Emma Sullivan	Paul Rose	11 May 2017	199,000
Nero, Dexter, Owen and Eli go camping for the weekend but are surprised to see Mr Bell, CJ and Mr Nunn there too. Meanwhile, Lizzie leaves Mrs Goodman to babysit the twins and Amber, Violet and Darnesh but encounters trouble when Darnesh gives himself a haircut. But when Amber tries to glue it back on, a saucepan gets stuck to his head. Mrs Goodman tries to get it off but thinks she has also pulled Darnesh's hair off too. Meanwhile, Lizzie has organised a game for some of the pupils but gets stuck in the car with Polly, Chester and Isobel. Mr Nunn falls ill which makes Nero and Dexter go home. Dexter realises how much he loves Lizzie and asks her to marry him - and she says yes!
78	13	"Ring"	Tim Hopewell	Madeleine Brettingham	18 May 2017	N/A
Dexter and Lizzie are getting married, however they cannot afford to at the moment. It is later revealed that Mr Bell had planned to marry his now ex-girlfriend Anastasia but he has to cancel the wedding in an attempt to get his money back for a deposit on a new flat for him and CJ. When he learns it is too late to cancel, Bell decides to let Dexter and Lizzie have the venue, stag-do, hen-do and the honeymoon. Dexter asks Nero to be his best man and leaves him in charge of the ring. However when Owen offers to look after the ring for him, Katie accidentally takes the ring thinking it is her birthday present from Owen. At the stag-do, Mr Nunn makes the boys dress up as superheroes but they end up getting arrested after Dexter gets handcuffed to a chair at the restaurant. Meanwhile, Lizzie's hen-do doesn't go to plan when Zoe-Marie turns up and accidentally sprays blue on Lizzie instead of the tan she was supposed to use. The day of the wedding arrives and Dexter and Lizzie get married but not exactly how they planned. Owen asks Katie for the ring back so Nero can give it to Dexter for Lizzie. But Katie dumps him, much to the delight of Owen. Note: Zoe Marie Ingham guest appears in this episode. Note: Last appearances of Isobel Harlow and Miss Aliyah Higgins. Note: This series ended with a rap entitled New Beginnings

=== Series 7 (2018) ===
No. overall	No. in series	Title	Directed by	Written by	Original release date	UK viewers
79	1	"Boxes"	Tim Hopewell	Paul Rose	24 January 2018	N/A
Elmsmere Manor has moved to a new building after Mrs Goodman accidentally got the old school into debt causing it to be closed down. Mr Bell tries to support Mrs Goodman with it by telling her to take some time off. Meanwhile, everyone is stressing out about the move except Amber, Darnesh, Violet and Ingrid who decide to play games with the removal boxes. Polly has a solo on the radio with the school choir but little does she know that she will also be performing with The Splutters, the band whose concert she and Nero got kicked out of. When one of the Splutters sees Nero, she demands he stays away but when she hears Polly singing, she changes her mind...until Katie pushes Nero into the drum kit and breaks it. Ingrid thinks Darnesh has been squashed by a bin lorry when the box he was hiding in gets thrown in there, but he actually had just gone to the toilet. Despite breaking the drum kit, Nero is still determined to get his demo heard - the whole reason he joined the choir in the first place.
80	2	"Film"	Tim Hopewell	Julia Kent	31 January 2018	N/A
Mr Bell is still trying to get Mrs Goodman to take time off so he can ultimately become headteacher again. Meanwhile, when Polly isn’t happy with her geography test result, she complains to Mrs Goodman, inspiring her to do something special. She announces that the students will draw self-portraits to be printed onto tea towels. But Nero has a better idea - to make a film instead. He gets the students involved however power goes to his head. Mr Nunn is made to write a new geography test but finds out it was a waste of time when Polly gets locked in a cupboard. Amber, Violet, Darnesh and Ingrid cause trouble trying to find out what goes on in the staff room when Darnesh's glasses lens falls through the hole in the ceiling and into Mr Nunn's tea, which he chokes on. Mr Bell potentially finds himself in trouble with the police when he is left in charge after his anonymous phone call. Note: This episode sees Mrs Helena Goodman depart although she returns eight episodes later.
81	3	"America"	Tim Hopewell	Madeleine Brettingham	7 February 2018	N/A
Lizzie gets a letter to say that she has got a job in America as a scientist and Dexter is extremely pleased. However his main worry is telling Nero. Meanwhile, music lessons are cancelled and Dexter must now teach woodwork, much to the horror of Nero who only enjoys music at school. Nero goes to Hillview to audition and breaks the news excitedly to Dexter. But his excitement goes when Dexter tells him they're all moving to America. Nero goes to Lizzie to give her a piece of his mind and blames her for ruining his life. Lizzie shows Nero a letter addressed to Dexter that says he can work as a music producer in Hollywood, which brightens Nero's mood, realizing this could also be his big break. But Polly is annoyed when Nero tells her. Meanwhile, Eli tries to ask a girl out on a date but gets cold feet every time. But when he finally builds up the courage, he accidentally asks Katie out instead.
82	4	"Farewell"	Tim Hopewell	Paul Rose	14 February 2018	N/A
The day has arrived that Dexter, Lizzie and Nero are moving to America. Polly struggles to cope with her emotions of his departure and Nero thinks all his friends have forgotten about him. Meanwhile, Mr Nunn is given the job of showing Lizzie’s replacement, Miss Maddie Harper around the school and gets competitive when he finds out she used to be in the Army. Dexter meets his replacement Mr Danny Boyd and is happy with him. Amber, Darnesh, Violet, CJ, Ingrid and Chester are on the student panel for the new teachers but when Mr Boyd goes to the wrong room, they get fed up of waiting and go out to Mr Bell's caravan so CJ can attach an Ariel to the roof. Darnesh goes inside to make some toast but when he comes out, the caravan starts smoking. Isaac goes into the school when Mr Bell is doing an assembly to tell him to come outside. The caravan is burnt to the ground. Meanwhile, Eli and Eleesha get Mr Boyd to help write a song for Dexter, Lizzie and Nero which they perform in an assembly. Dexter gives Mr Bell the keys to the flat so he can rent it now that they're moving out. The three leave and Polly misses her opportunity to say goodbye so sends Nero a song to say goodbye. Note: Last appearances of Mr Dexter Harris, Mrs Lizzie Baker, Albert Baker-Harris and Faraday Baker-Harris. Note: Last regular appearance of Nero Johnson.
83	5	"Mr Garland"	Tim Hopewell	Julia Kent	21 February 2018	N/A
Owen is mistaken for being a teacher by Mr Boyd when he wears his dad's jacket to school. As much as it pains him to do this when he is followed around by Mr Boyd, he plays along so he doesn't make Mr Boyd look like a fool. Meanwhile, it is Darnesh's birthday and Amber and Violet are embarrassed when he starts doing his 'Big Birthday List' again for the tenth year in a row. He gets upset when they tell him it is embarrassing and that they're not little kids anymore, but they make it up to him with a surprise. Polly, Eleesha, Eli and Fleur persuade Owen to throw a party at his house but he wants to invite Katie to try and get back with her. However his plan fails when she turns up and sees Polly hugging him. Amber and Violet take Darnesh to the party, making him believe the party is for him. Owen is shocked when Mr Boyd turns up at his doorstep for the party. When Mr Boyd asks Owen to take him to the teacher's party, Owen crashes the car. Mr Bell and Mr Nunn still try to impress Miss Harper but it ends in Nunn being taken to hospital.
84	6	"Prank"	Tim Hopewell	Mark Oswin	28 February 2018	N/A
There is a mad prankster in the school which is first discovered when the 'Elmsmere Manor' sign has been changed to 'Smell Wee Manor'. Fleur, Eli, Owen, Eleesha and Polly are all staring at it, laughing. But when Mr Bell sees it, he immediately accuses Eli as the letter 'R' is next to his foot. Meanwhile, Mr Bell asks Miss Harper out on a date but when he sees one of her ex-army friends, he assumes he is her boyfriend and decides to make the date a promotional meeting instead. However Miss Harper is convinced she is getting sacked until CJ tells her it is a date. She asks Mr Boyd to pretend to be her boyfriend but he messes up and Mr Bell feels let down. Mr Nunn takes the kids on a trip but it causes havoc as Amber forged a letter but the art museum didn't have the money. Mr Bell is convinced Eli is behind all the pranks happening at the school so he suspends him. Polly tries to tell Mr Bell it was her as she was just trying to fit in but he doesn't believe it. All her attempts fail apart from her final one. It is soon revealed that CJ is the prankster.
85	7	"Tattoo"	Alex Jacob	Mark Oswin	7 March 2018	N/A
The gang had a party last night but when they get to school, they realize that their tattoos won't wash off. They come up with a plan to hide them by covering up in simple ways. However when Polly comes to school, they need to come up with a plan to hide her tattoo as it is on her face. Miss Harper is kicked out of her flat and when Mr Bell overhears, he decides to invite her to move in with him and CJ. Little does she know that. Mr Bell orders tablets for everyone to keep progress, lesson plans and even track where people are. Polly keeps trying to hide the tattoo and Isaac eventually tries to help. However he makes it worse. The gang decide to run away from school knowing that they'll get into trouble for having tattoos. Mr Bell takes Miss Harper to the flat but she still doesn't know it is his flat and not hers. Amber, Violet, Darnesh and CJ decide to form a band to beat Ingrid in the 'Battle of the Bands' but when they take Nathan Carter's CD to pass the music off as their own, they discover he is one of the judges. Miss Harper punches Mr Bell and takes him to hospital where they see the gang - and Polly's tattoo.
86	8	"Museum"	Tim Hopewell	Madeleine Brettingham	14 March 2018	N/A
Polly doesn't want to get any more detentions so she makes sure that her friends don't copy her science essay by locking it in her locker. However her friends break into it but Katie steals the essay so Fleur tries to write her a new one. Polly is annoyed when she finds out. When trying to explain what happened to Miss Harper, she gets a detention because Miss Harper doesn't believe the circumstances. Meanwhile, Mr Bell has organized a history trip to a museum and wants Miss Harper to come too but when she says her mum cannot look after her son, she asks if he can come too. But then she can't go on the trip as her mum's illness is worse than she thought. Amber, Darnesh and Violet try to convince Ingrid that Mummies are real but they scare Mr Nunn by accident who breaks museum property - he is arrested. Mr Bell loses Miss Harper's son and he tries to look for him back at the service station. Polly tries to convince her mum that she is staying late after school for an art exhibition and not a detention however when her mum comes along, she realizes that Polly was meant to be in detention instead. Note: Mrs Morgan appears in this episode. Note: First Appearance of Jack Harper
87	9	"Space"	Tim Hopewell	Paul Rose	21 March 2018	145,000
Polly wants to send a camera up to Space to capture some really good footage. However, Mr Bell does not like the idea and shuts it down - but Polly goes ahead and does it anyway under the influence of Fleur and Eleesha. Meanwhile, Owen wants to start a ventriloquist act with his puppet but when he starts insulting people, Chester tells him that the puppet is a metaphor for his thoughts and feelings so tells him to keep the puppet to release his emotions. But when Owen throws it away, it hits Mr Boyd who gives him a detention. Using the puppet to his advantage, Owen starts insulting Mr Boyd who overhears and gives him another detention. Meanwhile, Mr Nunn is made to teach maths and Isaac is told he must take a maths test otherwise he'll lose his job. Mr Nunn tries to teach the class maths but Isaac keeps interrupting about the horse in the maths question. Polly, Fleur and Eleesha try to find the balloon and they find it on the back of a builders truck who takes it back to the school as Eleesha wrote the details on it. They get there in time but Mr Bell catches them in the act.
88	10	"Rats"	Alex Jacob	Paul Rose	28 March 2018	N/A
The gang try to help Owen move on from Katie but just as they think they've gotten through to him, he thinks that them helping him is a way of trying to make him see that he needs to work harder to get her back. However he is upset when she finds a new boyfriend - someone just like him. Meanwhile, Isaac sets up mouse traps around the school to catch the mouse that is on the loose. However a rat is also seen and they end up getting a cat in to help catch the mouse and rat. Mr Bell is doing a magic show in front of the inspectors but he causes havoc when his allergies to the cat affect his performance. Mr Boyd does his best to help but it goes terribly wrong. To catch the cat that has now also gone on the loose, Isaac gets a dog in but the dog causes havoc as well. Mrs Goodman returns to school to show her support for Mr Bell and she is delighted with everything that is going on - despite it all being bad. Polly is determined to impress the inspector but she is left disappointed. Note: Mrs Helena Goodman returns in this episode.
89	11	"Holiday"	Tim Hopewell	Frog Stone	4 April 2018	N/A
Bell is not happy when CJ orders loads of boxes of cereal. Meanwhile, the gang decide to raise money to decorate the common room after it begins to fall apart. Polly is not happy with it and goes to see Bell. He says no but Mrs Goodman, who has returned to the school, suggests doing it themselves by raising money for equipment. The gang do just that but Eli spends the money on T-shirts and hats instead of paint and decorations. CJ wins a family holiday but must somehow get Bell and Maddie to pretend to be married without actually telling them. However when they all arrive at the theme park, they find out the truth and CJ and Jack get grounded whilst Bell and Maddie go off to a spa. Amber is determined to beat Ingrid at a mobile game but Mr Boyd catches Amber using her phone in class and confiscates it.
90	12	"Nanna Murphy"	Alex Jacob	Madeleine Brettingham	11 April 2018	N/A
Polly wants Fleur and Eleesha to go to a museum with her but knowing they'll get bored, Fleur and Eleesha lie and say they're visiting Fleur's nan. However Polly soon finds out they were lying and sets out to get revenge. Meanwhile, Darnesh is getting too big for his boots when he volunteers to be the art model and his portraits are displayed around the school. To calm him down, Amber and Violet ask Mrs Goodman to sack him as the model - but she says they're just jealous and refuses to sack Darnesh. So they come up with a plan to get Darnesh to either embarrass himself or to step down as model. Amber tells him that the theme this week is nature and he will have to strip completely nude for it. But when he does, Mrs Goodman is not impressed and talks to him about why he did it. Meanwhile, Miss Harper has started a fencing club and Owen and Eli decide to give it a go. Katie sees them doing it and is impressed with Eli's moves and says Owen was just messing around on a chair - however she soon realizes she got them mixed up and she was actually impressed with Owen's moves. Polly is determined to get Fleur and Eleesha to crack so when they lie to her again, she plans to go with them to the old people's home and the hospital. Fleur and Eleesha eventually crack and tell the truth.
91	13	"Talent"	Alex Jacob	Paul Rose	18 April 2018	N/A
When Mr Bell bans an end-of-year party, Polly comes up with the idea of a talent show instead which could be funded by the students. Mr Bell sees this as an opportunity to showcase his magic and allows it to go ahead. Ingrid decides to enter and when Amber hears of this, she decides to try and get one over on Ingrid by coming up with a bigger and better talent act, with no idea of what it is actually going to be. Mrs Goodman decides to return to her position as headteacher and cancels the talent show, much to the distress of Mr Bell who has to deal with the repercussions. He breaks the news to the pupils, causing Polly to kick off. This causes Mr Bell to permanently exclude her. Amber decides to tell Ingrid that her act is lion-taming and Ingrid laughs. Amber asks Isaac to use his dog and she puts a lion mane on it to make it look like a lion. When Amber shows this dog to Ingrid in a cupboard, the dog escapes and Ingrid begins to lose it. Mr Bell decides not to exclude Polly after all and Mrs Goodman says the talent show can go ahead. The talent show is thrown into chaos when the dog runs riot through the hall. Owen hides under a table where Katie is. She believes he was trying to save her from the 'lion'. They get back together. Note: This series ended with a rap entitled Grab the Moment

=== Series 8 (2018-19) ===
No. overall	No. in series	Title	Directed by	Written by	Original release date	United Kingdom viewers
92	1	"Christmas Past"	Tim Hopewell	Paul Rose	19 December 2018	N/A
Bell decides to cancel Christmas, upsetting the students. CJ is upset when Bell tells him that they will not be having turkey for Christmas dinner and instead, will be having a lasagne. Determined to see what kind of Christmas he'll be getting, CJ opens his present which turns out to be a briefcase packed with towels. He and Jack plot to get a turkey for Christmas and get it delivered to the school, enlisting the help of Amber, Violet and Darnesh. However, they're all shocked when it turns out the turkey is still alive. It escapes from the box and enters the vent system, meaning they must get it out before everyone else finds it. Bell is shocked when he is visited by three students, who tell him he needs to change his ways. Similarly to Charles Dickens' A Christmas Carol, he meets The Ghost of Christmas Past, who happens to be Clem. She shows him his past Christmas from when he was a child, showing him why he hates Christmas so much. The next visitor is The Ghost of Christmas Present, who is Eli. He shows Bell what he is like right now and how he needs to change before he ruins Christmas for everyone. Finally, he is visited the Ghost of Christmas Yet to Come, who happens to be Polly. She shows him that if he continues his Scrooge like ways, Elmsmere will be run under strict control filled with robotic-like pupils. Initially happy with what he sees, Bell realises he was wrong to cancel Christmas after not being able to communicate with CJ. After told all these things, Bell decides to decorate the school and celebrate Christmas with the staff and students, and is visited by Santa Claus. Note: Clemetine Burton guest appears in this episode. Note: Last appearance of Clemetine Burton.
93	2	"Roof"	Tim Hopewell	Paul Rose	6 February 2019	N/A
Polly is put in charge of helping new boy, Evan Lloyd, after Mr Boyd learns he is a troublemaker and thinks Polly could be a good influence on him. Meanwhile, Chester wants volunteers to help rearrange the library ready for reopening and when he bumps into Amber, Violet and Darnesh, he asks them. However when his back is turned, Amber and Violet run off, leaving Darnesh to help Chester on his own. Mr Bell is not happy when Mrs Goodman decides to stay on at Elmsmere, meaning he will no longer be made headteacher, and instead, Mrs Morgan puts him in charge of ensuring the library rearranging is being done properly and the children are behaving. CJ and Jack argue when Jack finds CJ wearing his socks, and demands for him to give them back. With no socks, CJ decides to paint his ankles black to make people think he is wearing socks, however he is shocked when Nunn tells him he has to go swimming. CJ pains over the black paint with pink paint and then goes swimming, however the paint comes off in the pool and he is given a detention by Nunn. Evan takes Polly up on the roof and Polly tries to make him come back inside. Mr Boyd sees them up there and goes up to tell them to come down. After coming down, Bell gives them both a detention, however Evan ignores him and rides off on his motorbike. Note: First appearance of Evan Lloyd. Note: Mrs Morgan appears in this episode, from now on, appears semi-regularly in the episodes after.
94	3	"Stig"	Ian Aryeh	Mark Oswin	6 February 2019 (BBC iPlayer); 13 February 2019 (TV)	N/A
Eleesha, Eli and Owen watch Fleur's house to find out who her new boyfriend is, after Eleesha tells them she has seen someone on his motorbike seeing Fleur. However she doesn't know what he looks like because he wears his helmet, making Eli believe Fleur's boyfriend is the Stig. When the motorbike turns up at Fleur's house, Eleesha, Eli and Owen wait to see who he is, however they're surprised when it turns out to be Katie. Owen becomes jealous and tries all he can to break them up, saying he wants to protect Fleur, but really, he wants Katie back. Meanwhile, Polly quits the choir after being influenced by Evan, and instead helps Eleesha with the fashion show. However when Evan invites her to come fishing with him to remember his grandad, Polly quits the fashion show to be with him. CJ throws his PE kit away so he doesn't have to do PE, however Nunn gives him a substitute kit - pants. CJ goes to get his kit however Isaac is now burning it. Owen holds a mini party to 'celebrate' Fleur and Katie's relationship, however he still tries to break them up, annoying them and they leave. Polly tries to go fishing with Evan but she realises she's going to miss the bus. She calls a taxi, but Nunn takes it instead trying to escape, upsetting Polly. Evan sits by the lake by himself and Polly cries with Eleesha, feeling guilty about everything.
95	4	"Quitter"	Tim Hopewell	Madeleine Brettingham	13 February 2019 (BBC iPlayer); 20 February 2019 (TV)	N/A
Darnesh accuses Amber of stealing his snacks that were in his locker. Knowing she has been busted, Amber tricks Darnesh into thinking it is a ghost stealing his snacks, and he tries to catch the ghost. Meanwhile, Eli and Fleur decide to skive off PE but Nunn catches them, and gives them a detention. However Eli tells him they were dancing, therefore Nunn tells them they have to do his assembly tomorrow and dance. Eli tells Fleur he can dance and they get Katie to teach them a full routine. However when Fleur gets the steps wrong, Katie gets annoyed and insults her. Katie and Eli end up dancing together and Fleur gets jealous, which ends in her and Katie breaking up. Meanwhile, Bell decides to resign from Elmsmere and move to Wales with CJ, who is not happy about it and later gets himself arrested to get back at his dad. He hands in his resignation, but is horrified when he learns that Ms. Goodman has also handed in her resignation, meaning he will be the new headmaster. Darnesh catches Amber and Violet eating his snacks, and is upset that they tricked him into thinking the school is haunted. Note: Last appearance of Mrs Helena Goodman.
96	5	"Book Group"	Ian Aryeh	Paul Rose	20 February 2019 (BBC iPlayer); 27 February 2019 (TV)	N/A
When Eli hears about Owen and Chester's mum's sausage rolls for the book group, he decides to join with Polly. Amber, Darnesh and Ingrid join them, also wanting the sausage rolls. However, when Chester asks them what their favourite book is, they don't have an answer so he tells them to read Jekyll and Hyde, and return to the book group once they've read it. Meanwhile, CJ and Jack find a robot in the school corridor, and CJ sticks a pen in it, trying to hack it. However it breaks, so they hide it in a locker. When Isaac asks them if they've seen it, they lie about it. Seeing how upset Isaac is about the loss of his robot, CJ and Jack buy him a new one, but he realises it isn't Moppy, the real robot, but thanks them for their effort. Eli and Amber become obsessed with books, a do not like what they've become. Meanwhile, Owen wants to use Evan as a case study for his psychology presentation, however when Evan finds out, he isn't happy about it and has a go at Owen. Chester advises Owen to do the presentation about himself, and talk about his insecurities. Owen takes on the advice and presents himself as the case study during the class. CJ and Jack own up to breaking Moppy, and show Isaac. Isacc isn't annoyed with them but ask them to help him dispose of Moppy properly. However they forgot to take the batteries out when they put the robot in the furnace, causing a fire in the school.
97	6	"Gloves"	Tim Hopewell	Mark Oswin	27 February 2019 (BBC iPlayer); 6 March 2019 (TV)	N/A
PC Rowe is giving the sixth formers a lecture after one of them prank calls the police, and tells them it is a criminal offence. Danny wants to ask her out on a date, however nerves get the better of him and he bottles it. Eli decides to help him with his nerves, however when Danny phones PC Rowe, he can't ask her out, and instead tells her the school has been vandalized. Realising she will come to the school and see there is no vandalism, Danny decides to graffiti the school wall, but when PC Rowe turns up, he quickly hides the bottle of spray paint so she doesn't see it was him. However, his hands are covered in blue paint. Mr Bell then shows up and demands to find out who did it, so tells Danny and PC Rowe to get everyone in the school to have their hands checked. Knowing he'll get in trouble, Danny tries to wash the paint off, however it won't come off, so he puts on a pair of gloves, not realizing they're Isaac's gloves. Isaac demands the gloves back, but Danny comes up with an excuse not to give them back, so Isaac asks for money for new gloves instead. PC Rowe ends up asking Danny out on a date, however she sees his hands are blue, and knows he is the culprit. Meanwhile, Amber and her friends want to win a lifetime's supply of chocolate, however they cannot enter because they're under 16. They get a picture of Polly, however the quality isn't good. So they prank call her, pretending to be a radio station and want her to send in a video of her song. Polly falls for it, and gets Evan to help her after Amber and her friends keep messing around with chocolate bar merchandise. However when she turns up at the radio station, a staff member tells her they don't do music and Polly runs away, embarrassed.
98	7	"Cake"	Tim Hopewell	Madeleine Brettingham	6 March 2019 (BBC iPlayer); 13 March 2019 (TV)	N/A
Nunn catches students burying the school hamster in the field, and shouts at them. However Eleesha tells him he wouldn't like it if someone shouted at his hamster's funeral, causing him to relive his childhood when he once had a hamster. After the school debate team fall ill, Bell tells Amber, Darnesh, Violet and Ingrid that they have to help Chester out with the debate and they are not happy about it, and neither is Chester. Meanwhile, Danny wants to throw PC Rowe a birthday party in the staffroom, however when he notices he has spelt 'Happy Birthday' wrong, and instead put 'Hoppy', he tries to fix the error by icing over it. However, Ms. Morgan startles him, causing the icing to go everywhere. He reveals to Eleesha and Fleur that he is dyslexic and thinks he is an idiot, and PC Rowe will think the same. He goes to the bakery to get a new cake, however when he arrives back at the school, it is a football cake for a 5 year old. He tries to ice 'Happy Birthday' onto it, however when PC Rowe arrives at the party, he realizes he put 'Happy Birthday' instead, which is pointed out by Nunn. The debate team from St. Cutherbert's School arrives at Elmsmere and Chester is worried they'll lose because Amber and her friends did not revise the notes. Little does he know Amber read the other school's notes and they win the debate. Nunn opens up to Owen about his hamster and how he never got to mourn the death. So Owen surprises him with a new hamster.
99	8	"Spleen"	Ian Aryeh	Paul Rose	13 March 2019 (BBC iPlayer); 20 March 2019 (TV)	N/A
Eli tells Nunn that he needs to go to the hospital because it is important, however Nunn doesn't let him, and makes him do the cross country. However, when Nunn isn't looking, Eli runs off and goes to the hospital where he is visiting his sick Nan. When his Nan is taken off for an operation, Eli sees an empty bed, so lies in it and puts his earphones in before falling asleep. A doctor comes along, and believes he is a patient, so takes Eli to another room, where he can relax. Meanwhile, Amber and Violet shut Darnesh into an old locker, so Darnesh can jump out and scare people. Amber tells Darnesh to jump out when she speaks to Ingrid, however they find out that the door won't open, therefore Darnesh is locked in. They try to get him out but the door is completely jammed. They try to remove the locker, however they are caught by Isaac. Eli wakes up and finds he is in a hospital gown, and a nurse comes in with a tray with food and turns the TV on for him. Nunn asks Owen where Eli is, however Owen doesn't know where he is. Eli rings Owen and tells him he is at the hospital visiting his Nan, however Eleesha overhears and takes the phone. She believes Eli is sick, therefore starts a fundraiser to buy him a get well soon present. When Nunn finds out, he decides to get him the present himself. Eli hears Nunn in the hospital, so runs off and hides. The nurse goes to see if Eli is up for visitors, however comes back and tells Nunn that he is gone. Nunn misinterprets this and believes Eli has died. Darnesh sneezes in the locker when he is at the top of the stairs, which causes the locker to fall down them, opening the door and allowing Darnesh to get out. Overrun by guilt, Nunn tries to leave the school but when he sees Eli in school, perfectly alive, he gives him a detention.
100	9	"Hollywood"	Tim Hopewell	Paul Rose	20 March 2019 (BBC iPlayer); 27 March 2019 (TV)	N/A
100th episode special. Nero is living the dream in Hollywood, trying to make it big. Whilst at the airport, he meets a man who says to be an agent and gives him a business card. However when Nero goes to his office, he discovers this man, Eddie, may not be an agent by the appearance of his office. At a diner, Nero meets Amy, a college student. She takes him to her college, but he is faced with Drew, a bully. Nero makes a web of lies and ends up enrolling at the college, when he meets the principal, Dean Shroeder. Nero tells Dean he is in line for the throne and Dean insists Nero gives a lecture about British royal history. Nero calls Eli and Owen and tells them they need to leave early in the morning to get their plane to California, and that Owen needs to write a whole lecture about the history of British royalty. However, due to all of their rushing around, they end up on the wrong plane and are actually on their way to Alaska. With no signal, they can't contact Nero. Later, Nero sees Eddie again, and Eddie insists that Nero is going to be a star. Note: Guest appearance of Nero Johnson. Note: Last appearance of Nero Johnson. Note: This episode was the 100th episode special, all set on location. None of the main cast featured except for Daniel Kerr as Eli, and Lewis Brindley as Owen. The opening titles were not used in this episode.
101	10	"Magic"	Ian Aryeh	Madeleine Brettingham	27 March 2019 (BBC iPlayer); 3 April 2019 (TV)	N/A
Bell tries to convince CJ to be his magician's assistant in the magic show, however CJ isn't happy about it. He instead tries to get Jack to do it because it means CJ can go and live with his mum again and Jack will have his own room in the flat. Jack then reluctantly agrees to do it to help CJ out. Meanwhile, Mrs Morgan asks Bell if he has done the presentation for the headteacher's conference, however Bell had completely forgotten about it, so instead asks Mr Boyd to do the presentation so that he can do the magic show. He gives Mr Boyd some notes and tells him to work on it. Mr Boyd practices his presentation to his Sixth Formers, however they tell him it's boring and that they'll help him improve it. Eli redoes the presentation, and reveals that there are more robots. Bell invites Mrs Morgan and Mr Boyd round to his flat so that Mr Boyd can practice the presentation. However, Mrs Morgan isn't happy that Mr Boyd is doing the presentation and instead makes Bell do it, meaning he presents Eli's new robot presentation. CJ puts Jack in the magician's box and then takes him to the living room. CJ then leaves without Jack, where Bell then tells Mr Boyd that CJ's mum has gone travelling with new partner, meaning that she has chosen not to look after CJ. Jack overhears this and tells Bell and CJ they need to talk.
102	11	"Beans"	Tim Hopewell	Julia Kent	3 April 2019 (BBC iPlayer); 10 April 2019 (TV)	N/A
Eli thinks Owen has a girlfriend because he has been so distant lately, so he decides to go and investigate by following Owen to the library. He, Eleesha, Fleur and Katie spot Owen sat in the library with a mysterious person with a black cape, hiding their identity. They go in and see that Owen is playing a board game with Nunn and Chester. Finding this funny, Eli, Fleur, Eleesha and Katie decide to join the game to mock Owen. However, eventually, they actually enjoy the game and become competitive. Meanwhile, Polly is asked to be a Student PC, meaning she has to help PC Rowe in the high street, handing out leaflets. But when she sees Evan, she asks PC Rowe if she can go on her break. When she catches up with Evan, she lies and says she is bunking off. Evan goes into a newsagents and steals a tin of beans, which triggers Polly and she tells him to put it back. But when Evan says she's too good to do anything like that, she decides to steal one too. When Evan leaves the shop, Polly pays for her tin of beans, plus Evan's so that they don't get into trouble. Ingrid, Violet and Amber see Darnesh's cousin in school and think he is attractive, so ask Darnesh if they can join the Morris-Dancing team so they can get close to William. However, when they get there, they see that Morris-Dancing is boring, and William is 'sexist' because he says girls can't be on the team. PC Rowe arrives back at the school, wondering where Polly had gone. Evan gets the wrong end of the stick and thinks Polly has been arrested for shoplifting, so he bursts into the office and says Polly didn't shoplift and that he made her. Polly's mum asks if she shoplifted, to which she then takes her straight home.
103	12	"Eggs"	Ian Aryeh	Julia Kent	10 April 2019 (BBC iPlayer); 17 April 2019 (TV)	N/A
Eli is convinced a girl likes him after he overhears her calling him 'bench'. He talks to Eleesha, Fleur and Katie about it and asks them to befriend her so they can find out exactly what she thinks of him and report back to him. However, they don't do it and instead lie to him and say that she really likes him and that she wants him to ask her out. But when they realize this could make Eli look stupid, they decide to make up lies about her to see if it can make Eli back away and change his mind about asking her out. When they say she doesn't like haggis, Eli isn't happy and reveals that he did ask her out and she said yes, making his friends feel bad. He dumps her in front of everyone. Meanwhile, Darnesh has a jar of pickled eggs that go out of date today, and therefore must eat them all by the end of the day. However, Bell confiscates them and puts them in his cupboard. Determined to eat them before they go off, Darnesh, Violet, Amber, and Ingrid go into Bell's office and eat the eggs, but when Bell catches them, he gives them a detention. Amber and Violet run off to the toilets to throw up after helping Darnesh eat the eggs. Polly is worried about Evan, and when she turns up at his house, she is shocked at the conditions he lives in. She calls her mum, and when she arrives, she tells Evan he is staying with them. Evan is upset with Polly and doesn't talk to her on the journey back to her house.
104	13	"Prizes"	Tim Hopewell	Madeleine Brettingham	17 April 2019 (BBC iPlayer); 24 April 2019 (TV)	N/A
Evan is still upset with Polly for telling her mum about his situation. However, Polly feels guilty and runs after Evan saying he can live with them if he has nowhere else to stay. But Evan doesn't believe her and runs off. Polly asks her mum if Evan can stay but she says no and says that she's already contacted social services, much to the horror of Polly. Meanwhile, Owen and Chester argue about who will win the 'Pupil of the Year' award, but Eli overhears Nunn joking about giving him the award, which Eli takes seriously and believes he will actually win it. He tells his friends that he's going to win it, and they laugh at him. Mr Boyd comes in and says that instead of trophies, winning students will get mugs which read 'WINNER' and says they're alternative awards for students who have done well this year. However they don't appreciate it. At the awards ceremony, Mr Boyd changes his awards and makes them more fun than serious, much to the delight of Fleur who gets the award for 'Rudest Comment Made to a Teacher'. Polly and Evan talk in the playground, and Evan forgives her for what she did. He reveals that he's going to live with his aunt in Wales and they head back into the hall for the awards ceremony. Bell gives Polly the 'Pupil of the Year' award after he disqualified Owen and Chester for smashing his office window. Polly is delighted, and Evan tells her that he's proud of her, and hopes she doesn't forget him. Note: Last appearance of Mr Danny Boyd, Miss Maddie Harper, Jack Harper and Eli Grant. Note: This series ended with a rap entitled Friends Help Celebrate

=== Flashbacks (2019-20) ===
In Series 8, The show's 100th episode aired and to celebrate the milestone, 3 episodes Titled 'Flashbacks' aired in late 2019 and early 2020 on CBBC and BBC iPlayer. These episodes consisted of past and present cast reacting to past episodes and their best moments from the show. The 3 episodes were filmed during the filming of Series 8.

No. overall	Title	Directed by	Original release date	UK viewers (millions)
1	"Flashback 1: Hello Goodbye"	John Piper	29 December 2019	N/A
To celebrate the milestone of the show's 100th episode, cast members past and present take time out to enjoy their favourite moments from the show. With amazing entrances, emotional farewells and some smoochy stuff along the way.
2	"Flashback 2: Elmsmere's Got Talent"	John Piper	5 January 2020	N/A
The fun continues as Carter brothers Josh and Nathan make an emotional return to set and celebrate the talents of the Elmsmere crew, from rap to dance and magic to ventriloquism.
3	"Flashback 3: Elmsmere's Got Liars"	John Piper	12 January 2020	N/A
The cast ponder who of all the characters is the biggest liar of the lot? Plus big surprises for the cast when they get to 'enjoy' recordings of their first auditions for the show.

=== Series 9 (2020) ===
No. overall	No. in series	Title	Directed by	Written by	Original release date	United Kingdom viewers
105	1	"AXOLOTL"	Christine Lalla	Paul Rose	4 February 2020	N/A
New music teacher, Clinton Russell, is late for his first day at Elmsmere after his girlfriend, PC Emily Rose, has to tend to a call out. Meanwhile, Chester, Issac, and Darnesh are the school's new fire safety officers, however, their test runs of the new emergency facilities annoy Bell. Owen and Evan must replace the school's axolotl's after Evan forgets to look after them over the summer, resulting in their deaths. They go to the nearest pet shop to find new replacements, before heading back to Elmsmere and placing them in the tank. At her call out, Emily realizes that her sister has been arrested, and her niece and nephew need to be looked after. They are placed in her care. She takes them to the school, where they stay sat in the car whilst Emily attends the staff meeting. Bell announces that all staff relationships are forbidden, so Clinton and Emily must keep their relationship a secret. Bell orders Clinton to prepare his presentation, but after a seagull poops on him, he sits in the police car where he finds Emily's niece and nephew. Chester's demo run of a fire goes wrong when the smoke machine overheats. Bell doesn't believe there is a real fire, until the police car sirens go off, accidentally caused by Clinton. Bell congratulates Clinton, unaware that it wasn't his intention to set off the sirens. Note: First appearances of Mr Clinton Russell, Reiss and Coco.
106	2	"Anniversary"	Tim Hopewell	Julia Kent	11 February 2020	N/A
Eleesha wants to celebrate her friend-i-versary with Fleur, but Owen wants to join in as well since he met them at the same time. However, Eleesha and Fleur want to celebrate as just the two of them. They can't decide what to do as they both want to do different things, but Fleur makes the final choice when she invites Katie to join them at a concert. Meanwhile, it is Coco and Reiss' first day at Elmsmere, but Nunn soon puts them in detention because they were late to his lesson. Coco protests against it but ends up getting sent to Bell's office. Mr Bell is trying to practice his magic trick but it goes wrong when he accidentally swallows the key and can't set himself free. The governors are coming to the school, but Bell sets a bad impression when he still hasn't got himself free and Issac runs away and leaves him alone. Owen is still persistent on joining Eleesha and Fleur for their friend-i-versary but Eleesha tells him no. She is upset that Fleur has invited Katie, and when she says aloud what Fleur used to think of Katie, Katie overhears this and dumps Fleur. Fleur goes to apologise and Katie forgives her. Coco and Reiss try to get Clinton to help them get out of detention after Emily tells them she has got them a visiting order to see their mum, but Clinton doesn't believe them. In detention, Coco and Reiss still try to protest to get out and when Clinton realizes they were telling the truth, he manages to get them out of detention. Note: First appearances of Henry Ford and Magnus.
107	3	"Keys"	Tim Hopewell	Paul Rose	18 February 2020	N/A
Reiss is annoyed when Mr Bell confiscates is remote control centipede. Determined to get it back, Reiss tries to get Mr Bell's set of keys to the confiscation cupboard. Meanwhile, a new deputy head, Miss Wrigley, joins the school, and Mr Bell thinks she can help improve the school. He gives her a set of keys that she promises to keep safe but after leaving them on her desk in the office, Reiss takes his chance to steal them so he can get his centipede back. Fleur, Eleesha, Polly, Evan, and Katie are unhappy with the dress code for the sixth form so they protest by wearing costumes from the drama department. But when Mr Bell sees them, he says there is nothing wrong with what they're wearing and orders them to wear it for the rest of term. When Miss Wrigley sees her keys are missing, she hunts around the school for them, but remembering that Isaac also has a set of keys, she takes advantage and tricks him into leaving his office so she can steal his keys. But it soon goes wrong for Reiss when Isaac gets the sack because he lost his keys. In the playground, everyone gathers to say goodbye to Isaac, but Reiss puts a stop to it by getting Coco to distract everyone with the remote control centipede whilst he hooks Miss Wrigley's set of keys around Isaac's neck. Miss Wrigley soon gets her karma when Isaac spots her car keys on the set of keys and he takes her car, without realizing its hers, and mistakes it for a gift from Mr Bell. Note: First appearance of Miss Susan Wrigley.
108	4	"Mexico"	Tim Hopewell	Madeleine Brettingham	25 February 2020	N/A
Reiss hacks Clinton’s emails and finds a secret that risks Clinton’s future with Emily. Meanwhile, CJ hatches a plan to escape Elsmere, and Amber plots to get Isaac a pay rise. Note: Last appearance of Crispin junior Bell.
109	5	"Handcuffs"	Christine Lalla	Paul Rose	3 March 2020	N/A
It's lower school parents evening, but Reiss will do anything to get out of it, but when Emily says that she will take him and Coco. Magnus has brought his VR round so Reiss pretends to run away from home, leaving him and Magnus home alone, but when they get their hands on Emily's handcuffs they accidentally secure themselves to a radiator, and Magnus gets desperate for the toilet, so the boys try everything and anything to be free, which means that they accidentally destroy the flat. Reiss has no other option but to call Emily, and she loses her temper with him. Meanwhile, Clinton has been asked to have his orchestra perform on the night, and he asks Coco to sing. Coco is excited about the prospect of having Emily hear her sing and have somebody who cares about her progress in school, but Emily can no longer make it due to Reiss pretending to run away, leaving Coco upset, so Clinton offers to take her round all of the teachers. Meanwhile, Mr Nunn doesn't plan to go to parents evening, but after Henry hits him in the eye with a flute, he decides to tell Henry's parents what a disappointment the child is, but Mrs Ford recognises Mr Nunn, and she discovers that he is Henry's dad. They don't want to tell him, but they find out that the whole thing has been broadcast to the school over the announcement system. Henry is delighted to find out that he has a dad, and wants to spend as much time as possible with him and Eleesha has a driving lesson with Isaac much to the delight of Katie, Fleur, Polly and Evan. Note: First Appearance of Anna Ford.
110	6	"Scouts"	Christine Lalla	Madeleine Brettingham	10 March 2020	N/A
Evan helps Polly out when she lies to her mum – and ends up having to join the Scouts with Owen. Meanwhile, Amber and Darnesh hatch a plan to become chip shop millionaires and Mr Nunn tries to avoid Henry.
111	7	"Fishing"	Tim Hopewell	Paul Rose	17 March 2020	N/A
Nunn is forced to spend quality time with Henry and takes him on a weekend fishing trip. Meanwhile, Miss Wrigley wants her portrait painted and makes the mistake of asking Darnesh and Ingrid works in Zoe-Marie's salon. Note: Zoe Marie Ingham guest appears in this episode. Note: Last appearance of Zoe Marie Ingham.
112	8	"Brooch"	Tim Hopewell	Paul Rose	24 March 2020	N/A
Clinton forgets Emily's birthday. but finds a brooch in lost property, whilst Fleur becomes the school receptionist and Owen and Evan plan a party.
113	9	"Kissing"	Tim Hopewell	Paul Rose	31 March 2020	N/A
Darnesh gets his hands on Bell's autobiography, but loses it to the wind and has to rewrite it. When Miss Wrigley and Mrs Morgan find the rewritten manuscript, they fear Bell has lost his marbles. Meanwhile, Owen has a date but doubts himself after Katie insults his kissing. Worried that they will have to spend prom with him, Fleur, Eleesha and Katie give Owen kissing lessons with the help of Chester, and Reiss and Magnus battle to have the most creative locker.
114	10	"Elvis"	Tim Hopewell	Paul Rose	7 April 2020	N/A
Coco and Reiss are late to school and try to sneak into the school without getting caught and given detention, but Reiss knocks over some batter in the school kitchen, which lands on Coco. After Magnus mistakenly destroys her clothes, Coco has to wear Henry’s spare clothes - an Elvis costume! After Clinton sees her, Reiss lies and says that she is wearing the costume for a charity event for worms, which leads Bell, who is worried about losing his job to Wrigley, to announce a whole school charity event, wearing Elvis costumes, which most of the school partake in. Reiss comes clean to Clinton when Coco gets annoyed with him, and Clinton tells Wrigley that the worms have saved themselves, so they will donate the money to other causes. After being Elvis for a day, and feeling lost in as headmaster, Bell decides to leave Elmsmere, and gives his job to Wrigley. Meanwhile, Chester finds that a book has been stolen from the library, and Amber finds the same book in her locker. Darnesh, Amber and Violet burn the book, but Chester discovers that they had no evidence of the book being stolen as the page in the log book had been ripped out, and that Amber had taken out the books from the same series. Chester tells her that the person who stole the book will have used the paper stupidly, and Amber finds a painting of herself in the hallway with rips similar to the one in the log book. Chester sees this and tells her that he did the painting to prove Amber stole the book, but Amber rightfully says the evidence can not be proven. Nunn finds Chester with the painting and gives him detention for a month. Note: Last regular appearance of Mr Crispin Bell.
115	11	"Cello"	Tim Hopewell	Paul Rose	14 April 2020	N/A
In her first role as acting headmaster, Miss Wrigley gets Mr Nunn to fundraise for Elmsmere, much to the delight of Henry. Clinton gives one pupil the opportunity to play a cello, but Violet misses out because of Mr Nunn and the cello is given to Darnesh instead. Violet tries to take the cello from Darnesh, whilst Clinton tells Ingrid he is going to propose to Emily, but she tells Emily whilst she is visiting Elmsmere!
116	12	"Glasses"	Tim Hopewell	Paul Rose	21 April 2020	N/A
Since Clinton moved in with him, Reiss has been disrespecting Mr Russell. Deciding he needs sorting out, he sends Reiss to Miss Wrigley who suspends him. To avoid Emily finding out, Clinton and Coco have to sneak Reiss into school when Emily is giving a talk in Elmsmere. Meanwhile, Eleesha has a university interview, which involves a trip to the seaside for the gang, but Eleesha gets second thoughts, and Mr Nunn runs out of contact lenses, so Henry becomes his guide dog. Note: Last appearance of Anna Ford.
117	13	"Limo"	Tim Hopewell	Paul Rose	21 April 2020	N/A
Evan is worried that Polly is angry at him after he said he’s not going to university, but Polly says that she won’t go either and will do online courses instead. But Mrs Morgan is not happy with that decision, and neither are Fleur, Eleesha or Katie! Mrs Morgan ignores Evan, but he knows that Polly has to go to uni, so kisses another girl at prom, which leads to a fight outside the Prom hall. Evan comes clean to Mrs Morgan and tells Polly she has to go the university. Meanwhile, Owen can’t get a date to prom, so asks Amber and Violet. Amber says that she has to have a limo, but Ingrid hears and says she wants to go, so Owen agreed to take them both. The limo picks up Amber and Ingrid first, but Ingrid gets stuck in the sun roof and the limo driver, who is revealed to be Mr Bell, refuses to drive. Neither Violet, Darnesh or Isaac can get her out, so they have to make the best of the situation and use the karaoke machine in the limo. Owen is then picked up by Fleur, Katie and Eleesha as they can’t bear the thought of him on his own in prom night. Coco and Reiss’ mum is on trial, but Coco doesn’t want her to get out, so refuses to go, and both end up upset. Whilst Henry, Magnus and Coco are setting up the prom, Clinton offers to take Coco, but gets stuck in a chicken suit! They catch up to Emily and Reiss, and Reiss remembers what it was like with mum, and admits he doesn’t want to go back either, but then pushes Coco away when she tries to reconnect with him, leaving her upset, but Clinton manages to break the riff between them. They decide to not go to the trial, and go home instead. Emily, who went to support her sister, tells the twins that their mum was given a suspended sentence and will be let out, but Coco and Reiss decide to stay with Emily and Clinton. Note: Crispin Bell guest appears in this episode. Note: Last appearances of Mr Clinton Rusell, Owen Garland, Chester Garland, Fleur Murphy, Eleesha Rahad, Katie Turnbull, Polly Morgan, Evan Lloyd, Isaac Rodgers, PC Emily Rowe, Mr Graham Nunn, Amber Baker, Violet, Darnesh Palmer, Ingrid Ingham, Mrs Morgan, Reiss, Coco, Henry Ford, Magnus, Miss Susan Wrigley and Crispin Bell. The episode ends with a rap called ‘It will be OK.’
