= Frog Stone =

British writer and actor

- Born: Frances Dora Catherine Stone; Preston, Lancashire, England
- Occupation: Actress
- Writing career
- Genre: Comedy

Frog Stone (real name Frances Dora Catherine Stone) is a British writer and actor known for comedy and drama. She is known for her TV and film work, which includes creating the BBC4 comedy-drama Bucket and has worked extensively in theatre. Stone was included on the BBC 2017 Talent Hotlist.

== Early life ==
Stone was born in Preston, Lancashire and attended Broughton High School and Preston College before studying history at Cambridge University where she was a member of Footlights. She occasionally taught History where she became known as a 'super-tutor'.

== Credits ==
Stone created, wrote and starred in Bucket opposite Miriam Margolyes in 2017 and wrote the episode "Flashmob" for the CBBC show 4 O'Clock Club.

Stone received praise for both her writing and acting in Bucket both in the UK and Australia. She received a Critics' Choice award for Best Actress in a Comedy (Television) in 2017.

Past credits include the Paul Abbott shows No Offence, Shameless, Best of Both Worlds, Ricky Gervais's Extras and Derek, as well as playing Aunt Nino in the Wachowski movie Jupiter Ascending, and Hadassah Bimko in the C4 drama The Relief of Belsen.

She has also appeared as a panelist on the BBC Radio 4 show Quote Unquote and had a minor role in Ashes To Ashes.
