= Ultimate Brain =

British television game show, 2014–2016

- Genre: Game show
- Based on: Gokuno by Nippon TV
- Presented by: Duncan Wisbey
- Starring: Imran Yusuf
- Composers: Andy Blythe; Marten Joustra
- Country of origin: United Kingdom
- No. of series: 3
- No. of episodes: 30

Production
- Executive producers: Hugh Lawton; Danny Fenton; Angela Norris (2014); Peter Wyles (2015); Andy Scott (2016)
- Producers: Steve Ryde (2014); Chris Curley (2015); Ian Curtis (2015); Kim Murphy (2016); Fiona Piper (2016)
- Running time: 28 minutes
- Production company: Zig Zag Productions

Original release
- Network: CBBC
- Release: 26 July 2014 – 21 August 2016

Ultimate Brain is a British game show on CBBC about science. It is hosted by Duncan Wisbey as Dr. Brain, a monkey scientist and stars Imran Yusuf as Guinea Pig (also known as GP). Series 1 began on 26 June 2014, series 2 began on 15 August 2015 with a new set and series 3 began on 23 July 2016. It is Zig Zag Productions' first children's series.

== Format ==
Three teams compete in each episode. Two teams (green and yellow) are made up of 10–12-year-old children. One team (blue) is made up of 'celebrities', often from another CBBC show. The teams compete in various different scientific challenges and quizzes. The winning team take home the Ultimate Brain trophy.

== Cast ==
- Duncan Wisbey as Dr. Brain
- Imran Yusuf as Guinea Pig (GP)

== Episodes ==
=== Series overview ===
Series	Episodes	Originally released	
Series	Episodes	First released	Last released
1	10	26 July 2014	24 August 2014
2	10	15 August 2015	13 September 2015
3	10	23 July 2016	21 August 2016

=== Series 1 (2014) ===
No. overall	No. in season	Title	Original release date
1	1	"Episode 1"	26 July 2014
Green Team: Aleena, Connor and Liz from Birmingham Yellow Team: Ella, Zachariya and Gabe from Roath Celebrity (Blue) Team: Sam Nixon and Mark Rhodes from Sam & Mark's Big Friday Wind-Up and Naomi Wilkinson from Naomi's Nightmares of Nature
2	2	"Episode 2"	27 July 2014
Green Team: Abi, Ellie and Jack from Bristol Yellow Team: Dali, Poppy and Sophie from London Celebrity (Blue) Team: Kia Pegg, Amy-Leigh Hickman and Joe Maw from The Dumping Ground
3	3	"Episode 3"	2 August 2014
Celebrity Team: Khalil Madovi, Akai Osei and Ruby Morgan from 4 O'Clock Club
4	4	"Episode 4"	3 August 2014
Celebrity Team: Shannon Flynn, Richard Wisker and George Sear from Friday Download
5	5	"Episode 5"	9 August 2014
Celebrity Team: Toby Murray – Rest of team unknown from Dani's Castle
6	6	"Episode 6"	10 August 2014
Celebrity Team: Bobby Lockwood, Louisa Connolly-Burnham and Kedar Williams-Stirling from Wolfblood
7	7	"Episode 7"	16 August 2014
Celebrity Team: Nick James, Jayden Jean-Paul Denis and Chloe Wong from Hank Zipzer
8	8	"Episode 8"	17 August 2014
Celebrity Team: Sam Fletcher, Kelly-Anne Lyons and Marvyn Dickinson from DNN
9	9	"Episode 9"	23 August 2014
Celebrity Team: Ted Robbins, Ian Kirkby and Scarlet Hazeldine from The Slammer
10	10	"Episode 10"	24 August 2014
Compilation episode. Dr. Brain looks back at some of the craziest scientific challenges from the series.

=== Series 2 (2015) ===
No. overall	No. in season	Title	Original release date
11	1	"All Over the Brain!"	15 August 2015
Celebrity Team: Iain Stirling, Chris Johnson and Ed Petrie from All Over the Place
12	2	"Brain Peter!"	16 August 2015
Celebrity Team: Barney Harwood, Radzi Chinyanganya and Lindsey Russell From Blue Peter
13	3	"Dixi-Brain!"	22 August 2015
Celebrity Team: April Hughes, Jordan Loughran and Kerry Boyne from Dixi
14	4	"So Brainward!"	23 August 2015
Celebrity Team: Cleo Demetriou, Sophia Dall'Aglio and Ameerah Falzon-Ojo from So Awkward
15	5	"The Brain Factor!"	29 August 2015
Celebrity Team: Stevi Ritchie, Betsy-Blue English and Parisa Tarjomani from The X Factor
16	6	"Friday Brainload!"	30 August 2015
Celebrity Team: Molly Rainford, Leondre Devries and Charlie Lenehan from Friday Download
17	7	"Newsbrain!"	5 September 2015
Celebrity Team: Leah Boleto, Hayley Hassall and Ricky Boleto from Newsround
18	8	"Show Me Your Brain!"	6 September 2015
Celebrity Team: Stacey Dooley, Robert Keene and Jasmine McAteer from Show Me What You're Made Of
19	9	"Officially A-Brain-Zing!"	12 September 2015
Celebrity Team: Ben Shires, Haruka Kuroda and Stephen "Sizzling Steve" Kish from Officially Amazing
20	10	"Brain Eve!"	13 September 2015
Celebrity Team: Eubha Akilade, Ben Cartwright and Oliver Woollford from Eve

=== Series 3 (2016) ===
No. overall	No. in season	Title	Original release date
21	1	"Match of the Brain Kickabout"	23 July 2016
Celebrity Team: Tyler West, Rachel Stringer and John Farnworth from Match of the Day Kickabout
22	2	"The Brainy Bunch"	24 July 2016
Celebrity Team: Matilda Ramsay, Jack Ramsay, and Holly Ramsay from Matilda and the Ramsay Bunch
23	3	"Brain O'Clock Club"	30 July 2016
Celebrity Team: Daniel Kerr, Grace McIntosh and Jade Alleyne from 4 O'Clock Club
24	4	"Wolfbrain"	31 July 2016
Celebrity Team: Gabrielle Green, Shorelle Hepkin and Rachel Teate from Wolfblood
25	5	"Ultimate Girl Power"	6 August 2016
Celebrity Team: Ella Gilling from The Next Step, Isabel Clifton from Hetty Feather and Millie Innes from Millie Inbetween
26	6	"CBBC HQ IQ"	7 August 2016
Celebrity Team: Karim Zeroual, Katie Thistleton and Lauren Layfield from CBBC HQ
27	7	"Technobrain Download"	13 August 2016
Celebrity Team: Frankie Vu and Marcus Bronzy from Technobabble and Harvey Cantwell from Friday Download
28	8	"Ultimate Vets and Brainy Pets"	14 August 2016
Celebrity Team: Inel Tomlinson and Johnny Cochrane from Junior Vets on Call and Ashleigh and Pudsey
29	9	"Ultimately Awkward"	20 August 2016
Celebrity Team: Jamie Flatters, Archie Lyndhurst and Charlie Nicholson from So Awkward
30	10	"Whoops I Missed My Brain!"	21 August 2016
Celebrity Team: Laura Mandeville from Whoops I Missed the Bus and Amelia and Grace Mandeville from The Mandeville Sisters
