= Victoria Carling =

English actress

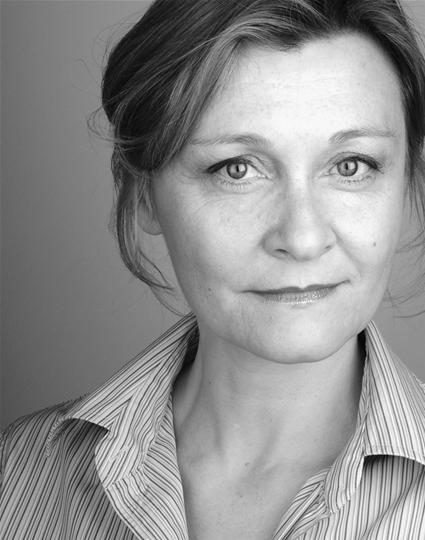
Victoria Carling

Victoria Carling is an English radio, television, film and theatre actress. She has an MA in English from Cambridge, and graduated from Bristol Old Vic in 1987, winning the Carleton Hobbs Award (with Stephen Tompkinson) in the same year.

After many roles for radio on BBC, including a dramatisation of The Railway Children (1991), she played Harriet Humphrey in the BBC sitcom Bonjour la Classe in 1993. Subsequent television roles have included Drop the Dead Donkey, EastEnders, Coronation Street, Holby City, Silent Witness, the ITV drama Homefront and BBC One's Doctors, and also an episode of The Green Green Grass.

She appeared in the television mini series Anna Karenina of 2000, and the film of Harry Mulisch's The Discovery of Heaven of 2001. Her first theatre appearance was in the premiere of Mr A's Amazing Maze Plays in 1998, directed by the playwright, Alan Ayckbourn.

In 1991, she appeared with Dawn French in Ben Elton's Silly Cow, at the Theatre Royal Haymarket. Other work includes a one woman show After Their Loving in 1990 (for which she was nominated for best actress in the Charrington Fringe Awards), Kafka's Dick at Watford Palace Theatre and appearances at the Chichester Festival Theatre and the Manchester Royal Exchange.

In July 2005, she appeared in a production of Steaming. In 2011, she toured Dancing at Lughnasa with the Original Theatre Company, playing Kate.

In 2013, she appeared in the BBC series Mayday, and several episodes of Coronation Street. From 2014 to 2016, she was a cast member in two series of the BBC drama In the Club. From 2016, she appears in 4 O'Clock Club as Mrs Goodman, which is a regular role. In January 2020, she appeared in an episode of the BBC soap opera Doctors as Anne Dolridge.

== Awards ==
Year	Award	Result
1987	Carleton Hobbs	Won
1990	Best Actress, Charrington Fringe Awards	Nominated
