= The Relief of Belsen =

2007 television film

- Written by: Peter Guinness; Justin Hardy
- Directed by: Justin Hardy
- Music by: Richard Blair-Oliphant
- Country of origin: United Kingdom
- Original language: English

Production
- Cinematography: Douglas Hartington
- Editor: Mark Gravil
- Running time: 101 minutes
- Production companies: Hardy Pictures; Hardy and Sons; The Wellcome Trust

Original release
- Network: Channel 4
- Release: 15 October 2007

The Relief of Belsen is a feature-length drama that was first shown on Channel 4 in the United Kingdom on 15 October 2007. It depicts events that unfolded at Bergen-Belsen concentration camp following the liberation of the camp by British troops in April 1945. Written by Justin Hardy and Peter Guinness, it nevertheless cites its sources from eyewitness accounts of people who were there at the time. These accounts are referred to throughout the film. It was directed by Justin Hardy, and produced in association with the Wellcome Trust.

== Plot ==
An ambulance crew are diverted away from the front in Northern Germany to help with an unfolding medical emergency at Belsen. At first, Lt Col Mervyn Gonin thinks it is a prisoner of war camp; however the full enormity of the purpose of the camp is soon revealed. A bemused Derrick Sington (Tobias Menzies) tells the rabbi: "I'm afraid it's mainly your crowd". Soon they realise that three quarters of the camp inmates are Jewish women and children from all over Eastern Europe.

Brigadier Glyn Hughes (played by Corin Redgrave) tells his men that typhus is the main concern, and that this will be dealt with by Lt Col James Johnston (Iain Glen), a highly respected officer who has performed heroic deeds in the past. Secretly, however, as revealed by his private memoir, "Johnny" as he is known, has terrible misgivings about the task in hand. There are some 40 thousand prisoners living in two hundred huts, in the most terrible conditions imaginable. The men cannot comprehend what they have stumbled upon.

As the days pass, more and more inmates die, from typhus and starvation. The British army have arranged a truce with the Germans to try to contain the spreading infection; eventually Johnston (Iain Glen) forces the SS to remove the corpses for burial. They continue to use the German nurses for the treatment of the typhus patients. The rabbi, Leslie Hardman, is desperate to help the inmates, but when he smuggles totally inappropriate food to them, he does more harm than good, and many die. The rations they are being given are not working either, and despite managing to control the typhus, hundreds are dying every day. Johnston and his officers risk being overwhelmed by the situation. Polish doctor Ada Bimko (Frog Stone) tells Johnston and Gonin of the horrors of the Holocaust.

An English nurse, Jean MacFarlane (Jemma Redgrave), arrives. She is inexperienced, and at first Johnston dismisses her. However, she shows strength of character and supports Johnston when he starts to crumble.

Eventually, after a raid on the hospital by the Luftwaffe, Gonin challenges Johnston's competence, calling him a "pen-pusher", but he has loyal friends who point to his past bravery. Medical students arrive at the camp to feed the inmates a special "Bengal Famine mixture" that has been sent over from India. Despite initial failure, the women slowly take the mixture, and progress is finally made. As Gonin, initially hostile, tells a despairing Johnston: "It's the little things that matter here". A shipment of lipstick is flown in to Johnston's disgust, but the women are thrilled, and he realises then how important it is for them to feel like women again after the degradation they have suffered. Despite several setbacks many inmates are fit enough to prepare to leave the camp, and the women are kitted out in second-hand clothes from a makeshift "shop" called "Harrods".

== Themes ==
Throughout the film, original footage is seamlessly interspersed with the dramatisation. Richard Dimbleby is seen both in the drama and in the BBC report he gave in 1945. Johnston and Sington watch footage of a tractor scooping up corpses ready for burial, and Johnston tells Sington: "I don't think people are going to want to see this." But Sington disagrees. He tells Johnston: "I think people should see this."

The film ends with a condensed account of the lives of the main characters after they left Belsen. We are told that they all kept in contact through the years, and all were deeply affected by their experience there.

== Cast ==
- Iain Glen – James Johnston
- Nigel Lindsay – Mervyn Gonin
- Jemma Redgrave – Jean McFarlane
- Corin Redgrave – Glyn Hughes
- Tobias Menzies – Derrick Sington
- Oliver Ford Davies – Martin Lipscomb
- Iddo Goldberg – Emmanuel Fisher
- Paul Hilton – Leslie Hardman
- Frog Stone – Hadassah Bimko
- Simon Paisley Day – Major Stadler
- Henry Pettigrew – Alexander Paton
- Christopher Sloman – Cecil Warren
- Vern Griffiths – Richard Dimbleby
- Katrine Bach – Lotti Burns
- Erich Redman – Hans Eckhart
- Laura Lowton – Nurse
- David Honeywood – Various soldiers
- James Saunders -Various Soldiers
