= Bucket (TV series) =

- Bucket Title Card
- Genre: Sitcom
- Written by: Frog Stone
- Directed by: Rebecca Rycroft
- Starring: Miriam Margolyes; Frog Stone
- Country of origin: United Kingdom
- Original language: English
- No. of series: 1
- No. of episodes: 4

Production
- Producer: Katie Mavroleon
- Editor: Adam Bokey/Jo Walker
- Running time: 30 minutes
- Production companies: Solution 3 Productions and Company Pictures

Original release
- Network: BBC Four
- Release: 13 April – 4 May 2017

Bucket is a four-part British sitcom about a mother and daughter on a road trip with the aim of fulfilling items on the mother's bucket list. The series was written by and starred actress and comedian Frog Stone as Fran, and co-starred Miriam Margolyes as Fran's mother, Mim.

It was broadcast on BBC Four in April and May 2017, having been announced in November 2016 by the BBC Media Centre.

== Main cast and characters ==
- Frog Stone as Fran
- Miriam Margolyes as Mim, Fran's mother
- Stephanie Beacham as Pat, Mim's cousin
- Catherine Steadman as Gemma, Pat's daughter
- Cyril Nri as Mr. Merdon

== Episodes ==
No.	Title	Original release date
1	"Episode 1"	13 April 2017
2	"Episode 2"	20 April 2017
3	"Episode 3"	27 April 2017
4	"Episode 4"	4 May 2017

== Reception ==
Bucket received generally positive reviews from the UK media.

The Radio Times called it a 'winning mash of bawdy quips and musings on mortality' and amongst praise for the series added 'Stone is skilled at lobbing heavyweight questions about life and identity into the freewheeling fun, without ever destroying the atmosphere. And the family snapshot we keep glimpsing hints at a revelation or two next week. After just three episodes, Bucket feels an old friend already.'

The Daily Express called it 'a superb piece of television'. and praised Stone's performance as a perfect foil to Margolyes.

The Guardian's Jonathan Wright said: "Bucket doesn’t always quite work but when it finds its rhythm it’s very good indeed."

In a four-star review, The Telegraph's Jasper Rees commended the show's main cast: "Margolyes was born to play Mim. What other short round septuagenarian would gladly bare quite a lot in a crimson negligee? But let’s hear it too for Frog Stone, whose baby this is. She wrote the script and plays the stooge with a nicely judged mix of petulance and weariness. There’s a lovely turn too from Stephanie Beacham as Mim’s supercilious cousin."

Bruce Dessau from comedy website Beyond The Joke said: "This is a sweet series full of nice performances and genuine chemistry between the two stars. Even if it doesn’t entirely convince all the time the fraught relationship between Mim and Fran is certainly believable. And right up to the end we get surprises, although some are a little more telegraphed than others."
