= Emmanuel Fisher =

British composer and conductor

Emmanuel Fisher (25 September 1921 – 22 July 2001) was a British composer and conductor who was best known for leading the London Jewish Male Choir for 21 years.

During the Second World War, Fisher served as a radiographer in the Royal Army Medical Corps, British Army. As a private in 32 Casualty Clearing Station, he was involved in humanitarian rescue work at the liberated Bergen-Belsen concentration camp. There was little use for a radiographer in the camp, and he acted as a nurse and orderly in addition to being a translator (he spoke multiple languages including German, French and Yiddish). His work was dramatised in the 2007 Channel 4 film The Relief of Belsen, with Fisher portrayed by Iddo Goldberg.
