= Nathan Clarke (actor) =

British actor

Nathan Clarke is a British actor. He trained at East 15 Acting School.

== Career ==
Before attending East 15 Acting School, he worked as an extra in both Harry Potter and the Order of the Phoenix and Harry Potter and the Half-Blood Prince. Since graduating, Clarke has worked extensively in theatre, film and television.

His most notable roles have included voicing the character of Alfie, in the CGI animated children's action film Thomas & Friends: Sodor's Legend of the Lost Treasure (2015), and playing Munir Al-Yazbek in the American drama television series, Tyrant. He has also played Danny Boyd in Series 7 and 8 of CBBC's 4 O'Clock Club. Theatre work includes stage productions for the Royal National Theatre, Trafalgar Studios, the Royal Court Theatre, and the Watford Palace Theatre.

== Filmography ==
Year	Title	Role	Notes
2007	Harry Potter and the Order of the Phoenix	Gryffindor Houseboy	Uncredited
2009	Harry Potter and the Half-Blood Prince	Gryffindor Houseboy	Uncredited
2014	We Still Kill the Old Way	Dean	Film
2014	The Interceptor	Valet	Guest
2015	Sodor's Legend of the Lost Treasure	Alfie	Film; UK/US voice
2015–2016	Tyrant	Munir Al-Yazbek	Series Regular
2016	Casualty	Numar Hassan	One episode: Tangled Webs We Weave
2016	Plebs	Ramases	Guest Lead: Jugball
2017–2018	Thomas & Friends	Alfie	UK/US voice; One episode: Mucking About
2018–2019	4 O'Clock Club	Danny Boyd	Series Regular
2020	Alex Rider	Arrash	Series Regular
2020	The Duchess	Jay	Guest
2020	Sideshow	Dom	Film
2021–2022	The B@it	Zeke/Nico	Series Regular
2022	Magpie Murders	Freddy Conway/Frederick Pye	Series Regular
2023	Grace	PC Dan Paxton	Guest
