= Peter Guinness (writer) =

British television writer

Peter Guinness is a British television writer. His credits include The Relief of Belsen (2007).

== See also ==
- Television in the United Kingdom
