= James Johnston (British Army officer, born 1911) =

British Army general (1911–1988)

Major-General James Johnston OBE MC
- Born: 28 February 1911; Glasgow, Scotland
- Died: 17 May 1988 (aged 77)
- Military career
- Allegiance: United Kingdom
- Branch: British Army
- Service years: 1934–1970
- Rank: Major-General
- Service number: 63802
- Unit: Royal Army Medical Corps
- Conflicts: Waziristan campaign Second World War
- Awards: Officer of the Order of the British Empire; Military Cross; Mentioned in despatches

Major-General James Alexander Deans Johnston, OBE, MC (28 February 1911 – 17 May 1988) was a senior British Army officer in the Royal Army Medical Corps and the Senior Medical Officer at the liberated Bergen-Belsen concentration camp towards the end of the Second World War. A docudrama portraying his experiences attempting to save the starving and diseased concentration camp prisoners at Bergen-Belsen was made in 2007 entitled The Relief of Belsen.

== Early life ==
Johnston was born on 28 February 1911 in Glasgow, Scotland, the son of Walter Johnston and I. C. Gilchrist. He was educated at Woodside School, Woodside, Glasgow. He studied medicine at the University of Glasgow, graduating with a Bachelor of Medicine, Bachelor of Surgery (MB ChB) in 1933. Between 1933 and 1934, he served out his pre-registration year at Taunton and Somerset Hospital as a house surgeon.

== Military career ==
Johnston was commissioned as a second lieutenant into the Royal Army Medical Corps of the British Army as a lieutenant (on probation) on 25 October 1934. His commission and rank were confirmed on 26 February 1935. From 1935 to 1940, he served in India. In 1935, he assisted in the aftermath of the Quetta earthquake. He was promoted to captain on 25 October 1935. From November 1936 to January 1937, he served in the field during the second Waziristan campaign. On 1 January 1937, his commission was backdated to 1 November 1933 and he was given seniority in his rank of captain from 1 November 1934.

With the outbreak of the Second World War, he was given a permanent commission on 25 October 1939. As a war substantive major and temporary lieutenant colonel, he was promoted to major on 1 November 1943. On 6 June 1944, D-Day, he landed on Sword Beach, Normandy along with the 3rd Division. For the next year, he commanded field medical units throughout North West Europe. He was Officer Commanding 32 Casualty Clearing Station. Following its liberation, he entered Bergen-Belsen concentration camp on 17 April 1945. In his report the day after, he described Camp 1 as "a dense mass of emaciated apathetic scarecrows". Under the command of Brigadier Glyn Hughes, he was Senior Medical Officer and director of the Camp II's 17,000 bed hospital.

From the end of 1945 to 1947, he served as Assistant Director of Medical Services at HQ Malaya Command. From 1947 to 1949, he served as Assistant Director of Medical Services at Southern Command. He was promoted to lieutenant colonel on 8 August 1948. He was once more posted abroad between 1949 and 1952, serving as Deputy Director of Medical Services at the Headquarters of Middle East Land Forces. He was posted to Germany in 1952 as Assistant Director of Medical Services of the 2nd Division and Deputy Director of Medical Services for the British Army of the Rhine's Headquarters. He was promoted to colonel on 29 August 1957. From 1957 to 1961, he was Officer Commanding the British Military Hospital in Dhekelia, Cyprus. In 1961, he returned to England to take up the appointment of Assistant Director General of the Army Medical Department at the War Office. He was promoted to brigadier on 2 July 1964. Between 1964 and 1966, he was Commandant of the RAMC Depot and Training Establishment. He was appointed Director of Medical Services, Far East Land Forces on 18 November 1966, and promoted to major general. He relinquished the appointment on 1 November 1968. He was appointed Director of Medical Services, British Army of the Rhine on 16 January 1969, relinquishing the appointment on 22 September 1970.

He retired from the British Army on 14 December 1970.

== Later life ==
Following his retirement from the British Army, Johnston lived in the village of Northiam, East Sussex. He died on 17 May 1988, at the age of 77.

== Personal life ==
Johnston married Enid Eldridge in 1940. Together they had one son and two daughters.

== Honours and decorations ==
Johnston was awarded the Military Cross (MC) on 10 December 1937 "for distinguished services rendered in the field in connection with the operations in Waziristan, during the period 25 November 1936 to 16 January 1937". He was Mentioned in Despatches on 10 May 1945 "in recognition of gallant and distinguished services in North West Europe".

He was appointed Officer of the Order of the British Empire (OBE) on 18 October 1945 "in recognition of distinguished services during the liberation of prisoners in German Concentration Camps". He was appointed Honorary Physician to the Queen (QHP) on 25 September 1967. He was succeeded on 14 December 1970.
