= Jade Alleyne =

British actress

- Born: 17 March 2001 (age 25); Aberdeen, Scotland
- Education: Sylvia Young Theatre School
- Occupation: Actress
- Years active: 2015–present
- Relatives: Sonita Alleyne (aunt)

Jade Alleyne (born 17 March 2001) is a British actress. She is known for her roles in the CBBC sitcom 4 O'Clock Club (2015–2018), the Disney Channel musical drama The Lodge (2016–2017), and the BBC One series Years and Years (2019).

== Early and personal life ==
Alleyne was born in 2001 in Aberdeen, Scotland at Aberdeen Royal Infirmary. Alleyne attended Albyn School, but moved to South London when she was accepted into Sylvia Young Theatre School and she studied at a further education college. Alleyne attended multiple performing arts institutes, including HJA Performing Arts in Beckenham and was part of the street dance team, Dance Alive. Her aunt is Sonita Alleyne.

== Career ==
Alleyne joined the cast of the 4 O'Clock Club in the fourth series as Clem Burton. Her casting in Disney's The Lodge was announced in March 2016. Alleyne released her debut single "If You Only Knew" in June 2016, as part of the soundtrack for The Lodge. It was later remixed by Cutmore. In 2019, she recorded the theme song for the Disney Channel animated series Sadie Sparks. Later that year, she portrayed the role of Ruby Bisme-Lyons in the BBC drama Years and Years. In 2020, it was announced that Alleyne would portray the role of Tanit Ward in the Netflix drama White Lines.

== Filmography ==
Television and film roles
Year	Title	Role	Notes
2015–2018	4 O'Clock Club	Clem Burton	Main role
2016	CBBC Official Chart Show	Herself	1 episode
2016	Ultimate Brain	Herself	1 episode
2016	Blue Peter	Herself	1 episode
2016–2017	The Lodge	Kaylee Marsden	Main role
2019	Years and Years	Ruby Bisme-Lyons	Main role
2020	White Lines	Tanit Ward	Main role
2021	Twist	Estella	Film
