= Khalil Madovi =

British actor and presenter (born 1997)

Khalil Moyo
- Born: Khalil Nathan-Moyo Madovi; 10 November 1997 (age 28); London Borough of Bromley, England
- Occupation: Actor • musician
- Years active: 2012–present
- Height: 1.76 m (5 ft 9 in)

Khalil Nathan-Kudzai Madovi (born 10 November 1997) is an English actor, artist and musician. He played Josh Carter in the CBBC series 4 O'Clock Club (2012–2015), for which he won the Children's BAFTA for Best Performer. In 2016, he released an EP titled Mello3.

== Early life ==
Madovi is from Sale, Greater Manchester. He is of Zimbabwean and Jamaican descent. He attended Manchester Grammar School from 2009 to 2016. He studied Fine Art at Central Saint Martins.

== TV ==
Year	Title	Role	Notes
2012–2015	4 O'Clock Club	Josh Carter	Main role (Seasons 1–3); Guest role (Season 4)
2013	Hacker Time	Guest	Himself
2014	Ultimate Brain	Himself	
2016	Millie Inbetween	Trey	One episode (S3 E1) "Dad's New Flat"
2018	Damned	Sean Atkins	(E4) One episode
2019	Warren	Laurence	Season 1 Episode 1 (The Pond)

== Film ==
Year	Title	Role	Director	Notes
2018	Ready Player One	Oology Expert	Steven Spielberg	
2018	Holy Beef (Short Film)	Slicker & Jeffrey	Dwayne Gumbs & Iain Simpson	

== Awards and nominations ==
Year	Nominated work	Category	Award	Result	Notes	Ref.
2012	4 O'Clock Club	Best Children's Performer	BAFTA	Won	Role: Josh Carter	
