= Oscar Lloyd =

British actor (born 1997)

- Born: 16 September 1997 (age 28); Seaford, East Sussex, England
- Occupation: Actor
- Years active: 2008–present

Oscar Lloyd (born 16 September 1997) is a British actor best known for his role as Will Wylde in Emmerdale.

== Career ==
Lloyd started his acting career by appearing in television commercials. He was cast as David in the 2008 BBC drama, Hancock and Joan. In November 2008, a reporter for the Eastbourne Herald announced Lloyd had been cast in a Disney Channel production called Oscar and Michael's Phineas and Ferb Fan Club Show alongside Michael Selwood. The show "pays homage" to the animated comedy series Phineas and Ferb and sees Lloyd and Selwood solve everyday problems. Oscar and Michael's Phineas and Ferb Fan Club Show began airing from 3 November 2008. It was later renewed for a second series, which began airing on 10 April 2009.

On 19 January 2009, Kris Green of Digital Spy reported Lloyd had been cast as Will Wylde in the ITV soap opera Emmerdale. Lloyd also appeared in season two of Lark Rise to Candleford as Sydney, the studious, ten-year-old son of James Dowland. For his portrayal of Will, Lloyd received a nomination for Best Young Actor at the 2010 Inside Soap Awards. In August 2010, it was announced Lloyd would be departing Emmerdale. The actor made the decision to leave on his own accord.

2011 saw Lloyd feature in "The Curse of the Black Spot", the third episode of the sixth series of Doctor Who. Lloyd played the role of Toby, the son of a pirate captain played by Hugh Bonneville. Lloyd later featured as Toby in the seventh episode, "A Good Man Goes to War". From January 2012, Lloyd began playing Ryan in children's television series 4 O'Clock Club. The actor appeared as Gabriel in the BBC drama, One Night, which began airing in March 2012. From April 2012, Lloyd began filming a role for the BBC drama, Blandings.

In 2023, Lloyd was confirmed to be playing Jim Hopper in the Stranger Things prequel stage play Stranger Things: The First Shadow. The play premiered on November 17, 2023, at the Phoenix Theatre in London.

== Acting credits ==
=== Film ===
Year	Title	Role	Notes
2025	A Friend of Dorothy	Scott	Short film

=== Television ===
Year	Title	Role	Notes
2008	Hancock and Joan	David	
2008–09	Oscar and Michael's Phineas and Ferb Fan Club Show	Oscar	
2009	Lark Rise to Candleford	Sydney	Episode: 2.12
2009–11	Emmerdale	Will Wylde	Series regular
2011	Doctor Who	Toby Avery	Episode: "The Curse of the Black Spot"; Episode: "A Good Man Goes to War"
2011	Doctors	Andy Ebden	Episode: "The Sharpest Cut"
2012–14	4 O'Clock Club	Ryan	Series regular
2012	One Night	Gabriel	
2013	Blandings	George	
2015	The Coroner	Matt Wickens	Episode 1.1 "First Love"

=== Theatre ===
Year	Title	Role	Notes
2023	Stranger Things: The First Shadow	Jim Hopper	Phoenix Theatre, London's West End

== See also ==
- List of British actors
