= 4 O'Clock Club =

British children's television series

- Title card
- Genre: Children's drama; Musical comedy; Family sitcom
- Created by: CBBC Television; Paul Rose; Doc Brown
- Showrunner: Paul Rose
- Starring: Various
- Country of origin: United Kingdom
- No. of series: 9
- No. of episodes: 118 (list of episodes)

Production
- Executive producer: Connal Orton
- Running time: 27–28 minutes

Original release
- Network: CBBC
- Release: 13 January 2012 – 21 April 2020

4 O'Clock Club is a British comedy drama and musical children's television series set in a secondary school, which premiered on 13 January 2012 on CBBC.

== Background ==
In March 2011, auditions were held for 4 O'Clock Club, and the show was publicly announced the next month. In January 2012, the first episode aired, with the series wrapping up in March of the same year. Between 2011 and 2019, nine series, each consisting of 13 episodes, were produced, filming annually in the summer months.

== Synopsis ==
=== Series 1 (2012) ===
The first series centres on Josh Carter (Khalil Madovi), a pupil at Elmsbury High, and his older brother Nathan (Ben Bailey “Doc Brown” Smith), who works as a teacher there. Josh is portrayed as a laid-back teenage schoolboy trying to maintain his cool reputation, while also being rebellious and trying to cause trouble in order to achieve his goals and humiliate or outsmart Nathan. Nathan, a former Elmsbury High student and famous rapper, soon learns that only he will be able to stop Josh from his schemes.

=== Series 2 (2013) ===
In the second series, Nathan leaves Elmsbury to go to Scotland and new music teacher Dexter Harris (Jason Callender) joins the school. Dexter becomes Josh and his mother's new lodger, taking Josh's room as a result. As such, Josh hates Dexter through much of the series, until he finally accepts his presence and labels him as an "honorary Carter brother". The series also featured Crispin Bell (Simon Lowe) as the new headmaster, who replaces Byron, and proved to be far stricter than Byron. Mr Bell was a brutal enemy of Josh and Dexter for the remainder of the series. Isaac (Layton Blake) made a guest and a 1st appearance in Series 2 Episode 1 but his name wasn't confirmed and the credits say "Fowlmere Josh". Josh is 14 in this season.

=== Series 3 (2013–2014) ===
The third series featured Nathan's proposal and marriage to Melanie Poppy (Laura Aikman), who both departed the series, and Josh is forced to share his room with his annoying younger cousin, Nero (Akai). When the school burns down due to an issue with candles, Elmsbury is merged with another school, Fowlmere Manor, renaming the school Elmsmere Manor as of the fourth episode of the third series. Molly, Ryan and Miss Andress (until episode 13) do not appear in the rest of the series and attend a new school off-screen, known as Gosset High with Miss Anita Andress as the Headteacher of Gosset High.

Due to the merger, several new characters joined the series in episode three, these were PE teacher Mr Nunn (Dan Wright), Miss Parkwood (Sophia Di Martino) and pupils in Nero's year; Eli Grant (Daniel Kerr), Owen Garland (Lewis Brindley), Fleur Murphy (Chloe Davison) and Eleesha Rahad (Grace McIntosh). Sally Ann Matthews also joined the cast as headteacher Aine O'Brien and a pupil in Josh's year: Isaac Rodgers (Layton Blake) who is now part of the main cast. The series also has Bebe Johnson who is the secretary for Elmsmere Manor as well as the mother of Nero.

=== Series 4 (2015) ===
The fourth series features Nero, now in the main role, and his crew have replaced Josh and the Elmsbury gang who have all temporarily departed the series (except Isaac, who becomes Elmsmere's caretaker) and Dexter is trying to make it as an accomplished teacher but is given the new job of taking care of Nero's shenanigans, which indirectly resembles Josh and Nathan's relationship in the first series. The teachers who appeared in Series 3, Miss Parkwood and Aine O'Brien do not appear in this series, leading to the reintroduction of former head teacher Anita Andress (Liz Hume-Dawson).

The series also introduced a new main character, rebellious and cynical tomboy Clem Burton (Jade Alleyne), who joins Nero's crew as well as mysterious spray paintings of Andress appear around Elmsmere, called 'The Phantom Sprayer', however it was later revealed that it was Mr Bell who was the criminal. A new love interest for Dexter, Science teacher Lizzie Baker (Sarah Schoenbeck), is introduced in episode one.

A new recurring character, Isobel Harlow (Ruby Barnhill) appears from episode three. This series also features mini cameos from Josh's gang as shown in the series premiere and series finale. Nathan also makes his comeback in two episodes and is now a father to baby Moses.

=== Series 5 (2016) ===
In the fifth series, all the characters from the fourth series remain apart from Miss Andress, but with three new characters, Lizzie's younger sister Amber (Ella Marshall Pinder) and her friends Violet (Cara Jenkins) and Darnesh (Riley McCormick) who want to fit in with the "cool" kids, like Nero and his gang. Zoe-Marie's younger sister Ingrid (Zara Thurstan) also starts at the school and quickly becomes Amber's enemy. A new head teacher is also introduced in the first episode, Mrs Helena Goodman (Victoria Carling).

Throughout the series, both Nero and Clem try to tell each other how they feel about each other. Dexter and Lizzie are dating but must hide it from others, though Mr Nunn (Dan Wright) tries to hit on Lizzie. Amber, and her gang try to beat their bully Ingrid and Dexter and Nero face problems living together.

=== Series 6 (2017) ===
In the sixth series, Nero and Clem have finally begun dating after their summer romance, but eventually break up after several arguments. Clem departs in episode three to pursue a career in music. Dexter and Lizzie are expecting a baby, and eventually give birth to twins named Albert and Faraday. After his divorce in the previous series, and a brief relationship with newcomer Anastasia (Rachel Elizabeth Kelly), Bell finds himself living in a run-down caravan on the school grounds with his estranged son CJ (Rufus King-Dabbs), a newcomer to the series.

Dexter and Nero are both shocked at CJ's arrival, as Bell never mentioned in any previous series that he had a child. The series also introduces the characters of Polly Morgan (Mischa Eckersley), a fellow pupil of Nero's whom he tries to impress throughout the series and Owen's younger brother Chester (Rohan Green). In Series 6, Isobel Harlow was promoted to a series regular as she appeared in every episode.

=== Series 7 (2018) ===
The seventh series started airing on 24 January 2018. All the main characters from the previous series returned apart from Isobel Harlow (Ruby Barnhill). Elmsmere School has moved to a new location after debt caused the old school to be closed. Mr Bell becomes stand-in headteacher, while Helena Goodman takes time off to reflect on the financial issues of the old site. She returns for the final four episodes of the season. Nero's character departs in the fourth episode to pursue new experiences in America along with Dexter and Lizzie. 3 new characters were introduced also in the 4th episode: Science teacher Maddie Harper (Genesis Lynea), her son Jack Harper (Ashton Henry-Reid) and Music teacher Danny Boyd Nathan Clarke (actor).

=== Series 8 (2018–2019) ===
The eighth series began with a special for Christmas on 19 December 2018, focusing on Mr Bell and his relationship with his son CJ. The rest of the series began on CBBC on 6 February 2019 and was on the BBC iPlayer every Wednesday from 5:00 pm. Evan (Zak Sutcliffe) was introduced in this series as a 6th form student who is also a rebel. Nero returns as a guest on the 100th episode special which was the 9th episode in the 8th series. All the cast from the previous series return, with Mrs Goodman (Victoria Carling) leaving in episode four.

=== Series 9 (2020) ===
The ninth series began airing on 4 February 2020. PC Emily Rowe (Leah Hackett) who has appeared since the second series becomes a series regular. New characters Coco (Carys John) and Reiss (Aled Arhyel) were introduced as PC Rowe's niece and nephew, and are put into the care of Rowe after their mother is arrested. They are joined by new classmates Henry (Finley Allgrove) and Magnus (Harley Harrison). New music teacher Clinton Russell (Andy Umerah) was introduced as well, who replaces Danny, and also dates PC Rowe.

All the cast return from the previous series, with the exception of Maddie and Jack Harper (Genesis Lynea and Ashton Henry-Reid), Eli Grant (Daniel Kerr) and Mr Danny Boyd (Nathan Clarke) who all have left the series off-screen. Episode three sees a new member of staff, Miss Wrigley (Holly Freeman), join the series. Episode five saw Mr Nunn (Dan Wright) learn that new pupil Henry is his son. Zoe-Marie Ingham (Ruby Morgan) returned in episode 7.

This series saw the final appearances of CJ and Crispin Bell (Rufus King-Dabbs and Simon Lowe) in episodes 4 and 10 respectively and Owen (Lewis Brindley), Fleur (Chloe Davison), Eleesha (Grace McIntosh), Katie (Jasmine Payne), Polly (Mischa Taylor Eckersley) and Evan (Zak Sutcliffe) in episode 13 as they left sixth form. CJ Bell returned in episode 10 as part of a rap, and Crispin Bell returned in episode 13 for a guest appearance.

This series concluded on 21 April 2020 with the final two episodes being aired back-to-back on CBBC.

== Cast ==
=== Main ===
Character	Cast	Role	Duration	Year(s)
Isaac Rodgers	Layton Blake	Student (2x01–3x13), Caretaker (4x01–)	2x01, 3x03–9x13, Flashbacks (Series 7 and 8)	2013, 2014–2020
PC Emily Rowe	Leah Hackett	Police Officer; Reiss and Coco's Auntie; Clinton's Girlfriend	2x04–9x13	2013–2020
Mr Graham Nunn	Dan Wright	P.E Teacher; Henry's Dad; Anna's ex-husband	3x03–9x13, Flashbacks (Series 7 and 8)	2014–2020
Amber Baker	Ella Marshall-Pinder	Student	5x01–9x13 Flashbacks (Series 7)	2016-2020
Violet	Cara Jenkins	Student	5x01–9x13	2016–2020
Darnesh Palmer	Riley McCormick	Student	5x01–9x13	2016–2020
Ingrid Ingham	Zara Thurstan	Student; Zoe-Marie's Sister	5x01–9x13 Flashbacks (Series 7 and 8)	2016–2020
Chester Garland	Rohan Green	Student	6x05–9x13 Flashbacks (Series 8)	2017–2020
Mrs Morgan	Rosina Carbone	Chemist (6x06–8x02); Polly's Mum; Head of Governors (8x02–9x13)	6x06, 7x08, 8x02–9x13	2017–2020
Mr Clinton Russell	Andy Umerah	Music Teacher; PC Emily Rowe's boyfriend	9x01–9x13	2020
Reiss	Aled Arhyel	PC Emily Rowe's nephew Student; Coco's Brother	9x01–9x13	2020
Coco	Carys John	PC Emily Rowe's niece Student; Reiss' Sister	9x01–9x13	2020
Henry Ford	Finley Allgrove	Student; Graham and Anna's Son	9x02–9x13	2020
Magnus	Harley Harrison	Student	9x02–9x13	2020
Miss Susan Wrigley	Holly Freeman	Deputy Head Teacher (9x03–10); Acting Headteacher (9x10–9x13)	9x03–9x13	2020

=== Recurring and guest characters ===
Character	Actor/actress	Role	Duration	Year(s)
Anna Ford	Thaila Zucchi	Henry's Mum	9x05–9x13	2020

=== Past characters ===
Character	Actor/actress	Role	Duration	Year(s)
Mr Byron	Steve Huison	Headteacher	1x01–1x13	2012
Mr Jeff Thorne	Myles Keogh	P.E. Teacher	1x07–2x13	2012–2013
Mrs Melanie Poppy	Laura Aikman	Music Teacher	1x01–3x02	2012–2014
Ryan Woods	Oscar Lloyd	Student	1x01–3x03	2012–2014
Molly Finnegan	Alana Thornton	Student	1x01–3x03	2012–2014
Darius Phillips	Adam Kavanagh	Student	1x02–3x04	2012–2014
Rachel Crawford	Lauren McQueen	Student	2x07–3x11	2013–2014
Natalie Harlow	Beth Chaplow	Student	1x10–3x13	2012–2014
Bebe Johnson	Kerry Stacey	School Receptionist, Nero's Mother, Liz's Sister	3x02–3x13	2014
Miss Aine O'Brien	Sally Ann Matthews	Headteacher	3x03–3x13	2014
Miss Emma Parkwood	Sophia Di Martino	Assistant Music Teacher	3x03–3x13	2014
Mr Jameson	William Travis	Caretaker	1x05–3x04	2012–2014
Josh Carter	Khalil Madovi	Student (1x01–4x01), Relative (4x07, 4x13); Nathan's Brother; Liz's son Nero's Cousin; Bebe's Nephew	1x01–4x01, 4x07, 4x13, Flashbacks (Series 8)	2012–2015, 2019–2020
Mr Nathan Carter	Ben Bailey Smith	English Teacher(1x01–2x13); Melanie's Husband (3x02); Relative (4x07, 4x13); Josh's Brother; Liz's son Nero's Cousin; Bebe's Nephew	1x01–2x02, 2x12–3x02, 4x07, 4x13, Flashbacks (Series 8)	2012–2015, 2019–2020
Miss Anita Andress	Liz Hume-Dawson	ICT Teacher (1x01–3x03, 3x13–4x13); Deputy Headteacher (2x01–3x02), Headteacher (3x13–4x13)	1x01–3x03, 3x13–4x13	2012–2015
Agness Addo	Sade Malone	Student; Waitress	1x01–4x01, 4x13	2012–2015
Liz Carter	Dystin Johnson	Nurse, Nathan and Josh's mother, Nero's Aunt, Bebe's Sister	1x01–5x01	2012–2016
Ashley 'Ash' Newman	Tom Rolinson	Student (1x01–3x13) Mechanic (4x01–6x01)	1x01–4x01, 4x13, 5x04, 6x01, Flashbacks (Series 8)	2012–2017, 2019–2020
Anastasia	Rachel Elizabeth Kelly	Mr Bell's ex-girlfriend	6x01–6x03	2017
Isobel Harlow	Ruby Barnhill	Student	4x03–6x13	2015–2017
Miss Allyah Higgins	Kiran Landa	Science Teacher	6x05–6x13	2017
Albert and Faraday Baker-Harris	Uncredited	Twins of Dexter and Lizzie	6x04–7x04	2017–2018
Dexter Harris	Jason Callender	Music Teacher (2x02–7x03); Head of Music (3x03–7x03); Head of Woodwork (7x03–7x04); Lizzie's Husband (6x13–7x04)	2x02–7x04, Flashbacks (Series 7)	2013–2018
Mrs Lizzie Baker	Sarah Schoenbeck	Head of Science; Dexter's Wife (6x13–7x04)	4x01–7x04, Flashbacks (Series 7)	2015–2018
Clem Burton	Jade Alleyne	Student (4x01–6x03); Ghost of Christmas Past (8x01)	4x01–6x03, 8x01, Flashbacks (Series 8)	2015–2020
Mrs Helena Goodman	Victoria Carling	Headteacher (5x01–7x02, 7x10-8x04); Art Teacher (7x10–8x04)	5x01–7x02, 7x10–8x04, Flashbacks (Series 8)	2016–2020
Nero Johnson	Akai Osei	Student (3x03–7x04); American Citizen (8x09)	3x02–7x04, 8x09, Flashbacks (Series 7 and 8)	2014–2020
Eli Grant	Daniel Kerr	Student	3x03–8x13, Flashbacks (Series 7 and 8)	2014–2020
Miss Maddie Harper	Genesis Lynea	Science Teacher	7x04–8x13, Flashbacks (Series 8)	2018–2020
Mr Danny Boyd	Nathan Clarke	Music Teacher, Flashbacks (Series 8)	7x04–8x13	2018–2020
Jack Harper	Ashton Henry-Reid	Maddie's son Student	7x08–8x13, Flashbacks (Series 8)	2018–2020
Zoe-Marie Ingham	Ruby Morgan	Student (1x01–3x13); Hairdresser (4x01–9x07); Ingrid's Sister	1x01–4x01, 4x13, 5x01, 5x12, 6x01, 6x13, 9x07, Flashbacks (Series 8)	2012–2017, 2019–2020
CJ Bell	Rufus King-Dabbs	Student (6x07–9x04); Mr Bell's son	6x07–9x04, 9x10, Flashbacks (Series 7 and 8)	2017–2020
Mr Crispin Bell	Simon Lowe	Headteacher (2x01–3x02, 8x04–9x10), Co Headteacher (3x03–3x13), History Teacher (4x01–9x10), Deputy Headteacher (5x01–7x02), Acting Headteacher (7x02–8x04) Chauffeur (9x13)	2x01–9x10, 9x13, Flashbacks (Series 7 and 8)	2013–2020
Owen Garland	Lewis Brindley	Student; Chester's Brother	3x03–9x13, Flashbacks (Series 7 and 8)	2014–2020
Fleur Murphy	Chloe Davison	Student	3x03–9x13, Flashbacks (Series 7 and 8)	2014–2020
Eleesha Rahad	Grace McIntosh	Student	3x03–9x13, Flashbacks (Series 7 and 8)	2014–2020
Katie Turnbull	Jasmine Payne	Student	5x13–9x13, Flashbacks (Series 7 and 8)	2016–2020
Polly Morgan	Mischa Taylor Eckersley	Student	6x05–9x13, Flashbacks (Series 7 and 8)	2017–2020
Evan Lloyd	Zak Sutcliffe	Student	8x02–9x13, Flashbacks (Series 7 and 8)	2019–2020

=== Timeline ===
Actor	Character	Series										
Actor	Character	1	2	3	4	5	6	7	Flashbacks (Series 7)	8	Flashbacks (Series 8)	9
Khalil Madovi	Josh Carter	Main	Main	Main	Recurring	—N/a	—N/a	—N/a	—N/a	—N/a	Main	—N/a
Doc Brown	Nathan Carter	Main	Recurring	Recurring	Recurring	—N/a	—N/a	—N/a	—N/a	—N/a	Main	—N/a
Dystin Johnson	Liz Carter	Main	Main	Main	Main	Guest	—N/a	—N/a	—N/a	—N/a	—N/a	—N/a
Tom Rolinson	Ashley 'Ash' Newman	Main	Main	Main	Recurring	Guest	Guest	—N/a	—N/a	—N/a	Main	—N/a
Oscar Lloyd	Ryan Woods	Main	Main	Recurring	—N/a	—N/a	—N/a	—N/a	—N/a	—N/a	—N/a	—N/a
Alana Thornton	Molly Finnegan	Main	Main	Recurring	—N/a	—N/a	—N/a	—N/a	—N/a	—N/a	—N/a	—N/a
Ruby Morgan	Zoe-Marie Ingham	Main	Main	Main	Recurring	Recurring	Recurring	—N/a	—N/a	—N/a	Main	Guest
Sade Malone	Agness Addo	Main	Main	Main	Recurring	—N/a	—N/a	—N/a	—N/a	—N/a	—N/a	—N/a
Steve Huison	Mr Byron	Main	—N/a	—N/a	—N/a	—N/a	—N/a	—N/a	—N/a	—N/a	—N/a	—N/a
Laura Aikman	Miss Melanie Poppy	Main	Main	Recurring	—N/a	—N/a	—N/a	—N/a	—N/a	—N/a	—N/a	—N/a
Liz Hume-Dawson	Miss Anita Andress	Main	Main	Recurring	Main	—N/a	—N/a	—N/a	—N/a	—N/a	—N/a	—N/a
Adam Kavanagh	Darius Phillips	Recurring	Recurring	Recurring	—N/a	—N/a	—N/a	—N/a	—N/a	—N/a	—N/a	—N/a
Myles Keogh	Mr Jeff Thorne	Recurring	Main	—N/a	—N/a	—N/a	—N/a	—N/a	—N/a	—N/a	—N/a	—N/a
Beth Chaplow	Natalie Harlow	Recurring	Recurring	Recurring	—N/a	—N/a	—N/a	—N/a	—N/a	—N/a	—N/a	—N/a
Simon Lowe	Mr Crispin Bell	—N/a	Main	Main	Main	Main	Main	Main	Main	Main	Main	Main
Layton Blake	Isaac Rodgers	—N/a	Guest	Main	Main	Main	Main	Main	Main	Main	Main	Main
Jason Callender	Dexter Harris	—N/a	Main	Main	Main	Main	Main	Main	Main	—N/a	—N/a	—N/a
Leah Hackett	PC Emily Rowe	—N/a	Recurring	Recurring	Recurring	Recurring	Recurring	Recurring	—N/a	Recurring	—N/a	Main
Lauren McQueen	Rachel	—N/a	Recurring	Recurring	—N/a	—N/a	—N/a	—N/a	—N/a	—N/a	—N/a	—N/a
Akai Osei	Nero Johnson	—N/a	—N/a	Main	Main	Main	Main	Main	Main	Guest	Main	—N/a
Kerry Stacey	Bebe Johnson	—N/a	—N/a	Main	—N/a	—N/a	—N/a	—N/a	—N/a	—N/a	—N/a	—N/a
Sophia Di Martino	Miss Emma Parkwood	—N/a	—N/a	Main	—N/a	—N/a	—N/a	—N/a	—N/a	—N/a	—N/a	—N/a
Sally Ann Matthews	Miss Aine O'Brien	—N/a	—N/a	Main	—N/a	—N/a	—N/a	—N/a	—N/a	—N/a	—N/a	—N/a
Dan Wright	Mr Graham Nunn	—N/a	—N/a	Main	Main	Main	Main	Main	Main	Main	Main	Main
Daniel Kerr	Eli Grant	—N/a	—N/a	Main	Main	Main	Main	Main	Main	Main	Main	—N/a
Lewis Brindley	Owen Garland	—N/a	—N/a	Main	Main	Main	Main	Main	Main	Main	Main	Main
Chloe Davison	Fleur Murphy	—N/a	—N/a	Main	Main	Main	Main	Main	Main	Main	Main	Main
Grace McIntosh	Eleesha Rahad	—N/a	—N/a	Main	Main	Main	Main	Main	Main	Main	Main	Main
Sarah Schoenbeck	Miss Lizzie Baker	—N/a	—N/a	—N/a	Main	Main	Main	Main	Main	—N/a	—N/a	—N/a
Jade Alleyne	Clem Burton	—N/a	—N/a	—N/a	Main	Main	Main	—N/a	—N/a	Guest	Main	—N/a
Ruby Barnhill	Isobel Harlow	—N/a	—N/a	—N/a	Recurring	Recurring	Main	—N/a	—N/a	—N/a	—N/a	—N/a
Victoria Carling	Mrs Helena Goodman	—N/a	—N/a	—N/a	—N/a	Main	Main	Recurring	—N/a	Recurring	Main	—N/a
Ella Marshall Pinder	Amber Baker	—N/a	—N/a	—N/a	—N/a	Main	Main	Main	Main	Main	Main	Main
Cara Jenkins	Violet	—N/a	—N/a	—N/a	—N/a	Main	Main	Main	—N/a	Main	Main	Main
Riley McCormick	Darnesh Palmer	—N/a	—N/a	—N/a	—N/a	Main	Main	Main	—N/a	Main	Main	Main
Zara Thurstan	Ingrid Ingham	—N/a	—N/a	—N/a	—N/a	Main	Main	Main	—N/a	Main	Main	Main
Jasmine Payne	Katie Turnbull	—N/a	—N/a	—N/a	—N/a	Guest	Main	Main	—N/a	Main	Main	Main
Rachel Elizabeth Kelly	Anastasia	—N/a	—N/a	—N/a	—N/a	—N/a	Recurring	—N/a	—N/a	—N/a	—N/a	—N/a
Uncredited	Albert Baker-Harris	—N/a	—N/a	—N/a	—N/a	—N/a	Recurring	Recurring	—N/a	—N/a	—N/a	—N/a
Uncredited	Faraday Baker-Harris	—N/a	—N/a	—N/a	—N/a	—N/a	Recurring	Recurring	—N/a	—N/a	—N/a	—N/a
Rohan Green	Chester Garland	—N/a	—N/a	—N/a	—N/a	—N/a	Main	Main	—N/a	Main	Main	Main
Kiran Landa	Miss Allyah Higgins	—N/a	—N/a	—N/a	—N/a	—N/a	Recurring	—N/a	—N/a	—N/a	—N/a	—N/a
Mischa Taylor Eckersley	Polly Morgan	—N/a	—N/a	—N/a	—N/a	—N/a	Main	Main	Main	Main	Main	Main
Rosina Carbone	Mrs Morgan	—N/a	—N/a	—N/a	—N/a	—N/a	Guest	Guest	—N/a	Main	—N/a	Main
Rufus King-Dabbs	CJ Bell	—N/a	—N/a	—N/a	—N/a	—N/a	Main	Main	—N/a	Main	Main	Recurring
Genesis Lynea	Miss Maddie Harper	—N/a	—N/a	—N/a	—N/a	—N/a	—N/a	Main	—N/a	Main	Main	—N/a
Nathan Clarke	Mr Danny Boyd	—N/a	—N/a	—N/a	—N/a	—N/a	—N/a	Main	—N/a	Main	Main	—N/a
Ashton Henry-Reid	Jack Harper	—N/a	—N/a	—N/a	—N/a	—N/a	—N/a	Main	—N/a	Main	Main	—N/a
Zak Sutcliffe	Evan Lloyd	—N/a	—N/a	—N/a	—N/a	—N/a	—N/a	—N/a	—N/a	Main	—N/a	Main
Andy Umerah	Clinton Russell	—N/a	—N/a	—N/a	—N/a	—N/a	—N/a	—N/a	—N/a	—N/a	—N/a	Main
Aled Arhyel	Reiss	—N/a	—N/a	—N/a	—N/a	—N/a	—N/a	—N/a	—N/a	—N/a	—N/a	Main
Carys John	Coco	—N/a	—N/a	—N/a	—N/a	—N/a	—N/a	—N/a	—N/a	—N/a	—N/a	Main
Finley Allgrove	Henry Ford	—N/a	—N/a	—N/a	—N/a	—N/a	—N/a	—N/a	—N/a	—N/a	—N/a	Main
Harley Harrison	Magnus	—N/a	—N/a	—N/a	—N/a	—N/a	—N/a	—N/a	—N/a	—N/a	—N/a	Main
Holly Freeman	Miss Susan Wrigley	—N/a	—N/a	—N/a	—N/a	—N/a	—N/a	—N/a	—N/a	—N/a	—N/a	Main
Thaila Zucchi	Anna Ford	—N/a	—N/a	—N/a	—N/a	—N/a	—N/a	—N/a	—N/a	—N/a	—N/a	Recurring

== Series overview ==
Series	Episodes	Originally released		Average UK viewers (millions)
Series	Episodes	First released	Last released	Average UK viewers (millions)
1	13	13 January 2012	30 March 2012	0.42
2	13	4 January 2013	22 March 2013	0.33
3	13	20 December 2013	26 March 2014	0.36
4	13	28 January 2015	22 April 2015	0.21
5	13	25 February 2016	19 May 2016	0.31
6	13	2 March 2017	18 May 2017	0.22
7	13	24 January 2018	18 April 2018	0.16
8	13	19 December 2018	17 April 2019 (BBC iPlayer); 24 April 2019 (TV)	TBA
9	13	4 February 2020	21 April 2020	TBA

== Specials ==
Series	Episodes	Originally released	
Series	Episodes	First released	Last released
Flashbacks		29 December 2019	5 January 2020

== 4 O'Clock Files ==
4 O'Clock Files is a spin off from 4 O'Clock Club, following Josh Carter's departure for Hillview Academy. Set during the end of term at Elmsmere, it focuses on Crispin Bell, filming a documentary with the help of Fleur Murphy. He focuses on Elmsmere's curriculum, sporting activities and education, and also discusses the history of Elmsmere, about how Elmsbury and Fowlmere merged.

The series features clips from the second and third series, as the many topics of the documentary are discussed. The series also features Nero and his friends, who discuss the events of the third series. Isaac and Ash made their final appearances in Elmsmere uniform, discussing Josh's mishaps with Rachel and the adventures they had in Elmsbury and Elmsmere.

Dexter and Nunn were also caught teasing each other, at the expense of Dexter's end of year reports, whom he did Josh's and Zoe-Marie's reports. Josh is absent from the series (due to his departure for Hillview). He only appears in clips from previous series.

The programme aired on CBBC, between 14 and 19 December 2014.

== Production ==
Constructed raps are featured in every episode, usually relating to the current situation. As such, the series takes a musical style. Since the show began, all series have been filmed on location in Greater Manchester. For the first series, filmed in 2011, 4 O'Clock Club was filmed in a secondary school that is still in use: Smithills School, in Bolton.

The second series was filmed at Offerton High School (now Fairway Primary School) in Stockport in 2012, which was also used briefly in 2013 for the third series. From 2013 to 2016, the series was filmed in the former site of St Ambrose Barlow RC High School in Swinton. They also briefly used the former site of Radcliffe Riverside High School, in Radcliffe, for some indoor and playground scenes.

As of the seventh series, the show is filmed in the former site of St George's Roman Catholic High School in Walkden.
