= Médecins du Monde =

Humanitarian health NGO

Médecins du monde
- Founded: 1980
- Founder: Bernard Kouchner and others
- Type: Medical humanitarian organization
- Headquarters: Paris, France
- Region served: Worldwide
- Budget: €122 million (2022)
- Volunteers: 4,000
- Website: www.medecinsdumonde.org

Médecins du monde (MdM; French pronunciation: [medsɛ̃ dy mɔ̃d]), or Doctors of the World, is an international humanitarian organization which seeks to provide emergency and long-term medical care to the world's most vulnerable people. It also advocates for an end to health inequities.

It was founded in 1980 by a group of 15 French physicians, including Bernard Kouchner and Alina Margolis-Edelman (a native of Poland). MdM is active in over 80 countries with approximately 400 programs in both the developed and developing world.

== History ==
MdM was formally established on 1 February 1980. Its goals were "to go where others will not, to testify to the intolerable, and to volunteer".

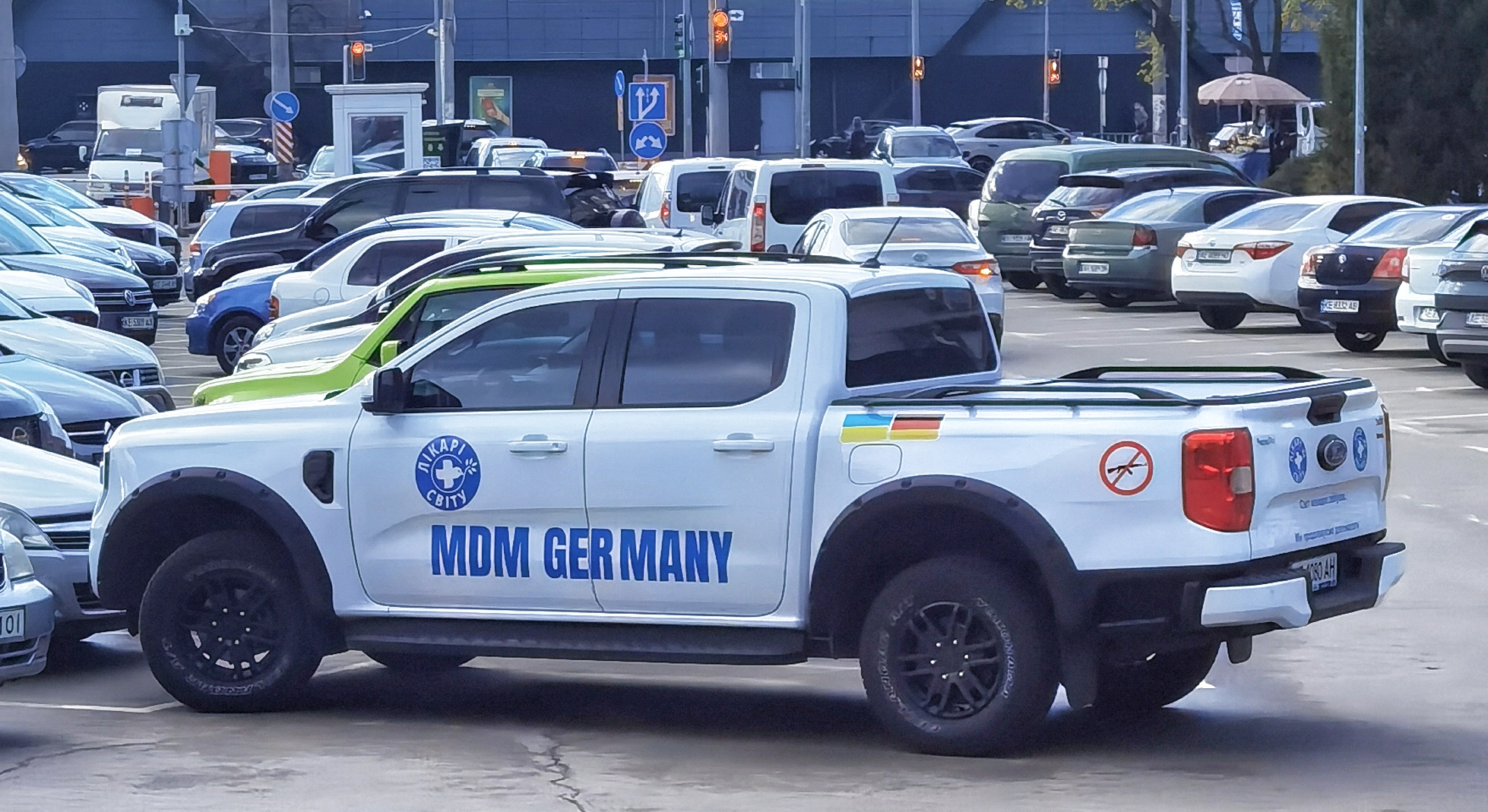
MDM Germany car in Dnipro, Ukraine, during the war.

The origins of MdM lay with Médecins Sans Frontières. During the Vietnam War, the future founding members of MdM were approached with the idea of aiding Vietnamese refugees fleeing by ship on the South China Sea. The majority of the Médecins Sans Frontières were against aiding the Vietnamese refugees. However, Kouchner, along with volunteer doctors, journalists, and others organized a hospital boat, L'Île de lumière ("The Island of Light"), to provide medical care and to report the refugees' suffering.

MdM was founded by Bernard Kouchner and 14 others doctors split from the group he previously founded, Medecins Sans Frontiers (MSF, or Doctors Without Borders). It has been reported Kouchner felt that MSF was giving up its founding principle of témoignage ("witnessing"), which refers to aid workers making the atrocities they observe known to the public.

Kouchner was president of MdM from 1980 to 1982. In 1989, the foundation of MdM Spain paved the way for the creation of the MdM international network. In 2015, the MdM global network consisted of fifteen associations; France (founded 1980), Spain (founded 1989), Greece (founded 1990, by Theofilos Rosenberg), Italy and Switzerland (both founded 1993), Sweden (founded 1994), Cyprus (founded 1995 by Elena Theoharous), Argentina (founded 1998), Belgium, Canada and Portugal (all founded 1999), as well as in Germany, the United Kingdom, Japan, the Netherlands, and the United States.

In December 2013, documents released by National Security Agency whistle blower Edward Snowden revealed that British and American intelligence agencies had been carrying on secret surveillance of several humanitarian organizations including Médecins du Monde. Leigh Daynes, Executive Director of Doctors of the World UK said that he was "bewildered by these extraordinary allegations of secret surveillance. Our doctors, nurses and midwives are not a threat to national security. There is absolutely no reason for our operations to be secretly monitored." Other humanitarian organizations targeted include the United Nations Development Programme, the children's charity UNICEF, and the head of the Economic Community of West African States.

== Chapters ==
=== Doctors of the World USA ===
Doctors of the World USA, also known as MdM USA, was founded in 1990 by Jonathan Mann. The group separated from the MdM network in 2006, and became HealthRight International. Doctors of the World USA is the 15th chapter of the MDM network.

It was re-founded by committed humanitarian activists in 2011, with Dr Abby Stoddard as its founding chair. Fraser Mooney, a long-term AIDS and social justice activist, became the organization's Executive Director in 2016.

In the 1990s, Doctors of the World USA conducted humanitarian and public-health programs in several locations, including Kosovo. Its work there included tuberculosis screening and treatment and a mass polio-vaccination campaign during an outbreak of paralytic poliomyelitis. The organization also sought to promote cooperation between Serbian and Albanian medical professionals. Following Hurricane Sandy in October 2012, Doctors of the World USA provided medical assistance on the Rockaway Peninsula in Queens, New York. The organization initially provided medical care through home visits and subsequently established a permanent clinic. The Rockaways Free Clinic opened in Rockaway Park in October 2013 and provided care to residents regardless of health-insurance status. In 2014, the organization worked with Columbia University School of International and Public Affairs on a health-needs assessment of residents of the Rockaways following the hurricane. Doctors of the World USA later expanded its work with migrants and asylum seekers. In 2022, it established the Border Health Program in El Paso, Texas, in partnership with Texas Tech University Health Sciences Center El Paso and local organizations. The program provides transitional medical care to migrants and asylum seekers and gives medical students and residents experience caring for migrant populations. In May 2023, PBS NewsHour reported on the El Paso clinic, describing medical care provided by Texas Tech physicians, medical students and volunteers to migrants with acute illnesses, injuries, chronic health conditions and other health needs. A June 2023 report by Cronkite News described the program as a collaboration among Doctors of the World USA, Texas Tech University Health Sciences Center El Paso and Annunciation House.

=== Doctors of the World UK ===
In 1998, Doctors of the World UK became a registered charity in England and Wales and initially only contributed to Médecins du Monde international work. It launched its UK Programme in 2006, when they opened a clinic in Bethnal Green, in east London. The clinic provides information and medical assistance to people who face barriers to access mainstream health services, such as undocumented migrants, asylum seekers and the homeless. In 2018, a successful campaign #StopSharing, contributed to the data sharing memorandum of understanding between NHS Digital and the Home Office, which had been signed as part of the Home Office hostile environment policy^{,}.

After the Western African Ebola virus epidemic in 2014, it helped run a treatment centre in Moyamba, Sierra Leone. DOTW UK volunteer Professor Chris Bulstrode was awarded a CBE for his involvement in the Ebola crisis. It is currently providing healthcare for refugees and migrants in several countries in Europe, including Greece and Croatia, and Ukraine.

Drs. Chris and Xand van Tulleken, who present the CBBC series Operation Ouch!, were Board Members of DOTW UK until 2018.

== Operations ==
MdM programs focus on four priority areas: Conflict and Crisis, Harm Reduction, Maternal and Child Health, and Migrant Populations.

MdM operates in both the developed and developing world, aiding in treatment of refugees, reducing harm long-term, fighting sexually transmitted diseases, and promoting sexual health and mental wellness. In 2018, Doctors of the World (MdM) provided care in 79 countries with over 300 programs in North and South America, Europe, Africa and Asia.

=== Finances ===
In 2018, the Doctors of the World international network had a budget of some 250 million euros, and provided services to more than 6.5 million people worldwide. It allocated 78.5% of its budget to programs.15.5% to fundraising, and 6% to operating expenses.

The organization is analyzed regularly by an independent committee to examine the operations of MdM and the allocation of their finances. In depth audits of MdM are done by the French government and Deloitte.

== See also ==
- Couverture maladie universelle (CMU)
- GlobalMedic
- Médecins Sans Frontières
