= List of Who Do You Think You Are? episodes =

Who Do You Think You Are? is a British genealogy documentary series that has aired on the BBC since 2004. In each episode, a celebrity traces their family tree. It is made by the production company Wall to Wall. The programme has regularly attracted an audience of more than 6 million viewers. More than 150 episodes have been produced.

== Series overview ==
Series	Episodes	Originally released	
Series	Episodes	First released	Last released
1	10	12 October 2004	14 December 2004
2	6	11 January 2006	15 February 2006
3	8	6 September 2006	25 October 2006
Adoption Special		11 July 2007	
4	7	6 September 2007	18 November 2007
5	8	13 August 2008	29 September 2008
6	11	2 February 2009	19 August 2009
7	9	19 July 2010	13 September 2010
8	10	10 August 2011	12 October 2011
9	10	15 August 2012	6 December 2012
10	10	24 July 2013	25 September 2013
10 Years, 100 Shows		6 August 2014	
11	10	7 August 2014	9 October 2014
12	10	13 August 2015	22 October 2015
13	10	24 November 2016	8 March 2017
14	10	6 July 2017	4 October 201709
15	8	6 June 2018	20 August 2018
16	8	22 July 2019	11 September 2019
17	4	12 October 2020	2 November 2020
18	7	12 October 2021	30 November 2021
19	5	26 May 2022	30 June 2022
20	9	1 June 2023	27 July 2023
21	7	15 August 2024	26 September 2024
22	8	22 April 2025	10 June 2025
23	8	26 May 2026	6 August 2026

== List of episodes ==
=== Series 1 (2004) ===
No.	Title	Original release date	Viewers (millions)
1	"Bill Oddie"	12 October 2004	5.79
2	"Amanda Redman"	19 October 2004	4.63
3	"Sue Johnston"	26 October 2004	4.25
4	"Jeremy Clarkson"	2 November 2004	4.95
5	"Ian Hislop"	9 November 2004	4.96
6	"Moira Stuart"	16 November 2004	5.35
7	"David Baddiel"	23 November 2004	4.60
8	"Lesley Garrett"	30 November 2004	4.41
9	"Meera Syal"	7 December 2004	3.97
10	"Vic Reeves"	14 December 2004	4.46

=== Series 2 (2006) ===
No.	Title	Original release date	Viewers (millions)
1	"Jeremy Paxman"	11 January 2006	5.48
2	"Sheila Hancock"	18 January 2006	5.43
3	"Stephen Fry"	25 January 2006	5.86
4	"Julian Clary"	1 February 2006	5.94
5	"Jane Horrocks"	8 February 2006	5.64
6	"Gurinder Chadha"	15 February 2006	3.96

=== Series 3 (2006) ===
No.	Title	Original release date	Viewers (millions)
1	"Barbara Windsor"	6 September 2006	6.40
2	"Robert Lindsay"	13 September 2006	5.95
3	"Colin Jackson"	20 September 2006	5.19
4	"David Tennant"	27 September 2006	5.75
5	"David Dickinson"	4 October 2006	5.80
6	"Nigella Lawson"	11 October 2006	6.15
7	"Jeremy Irons"	18 October 2006	5.82
8	"Julia Sawalha"	25 October 2006	5.54

=== Adoption special (2007) ===
No.	Title	Original release date	Viewers (millions)
1	"Nicky Campbell"	11 July 2007	4.32

=== Series 4 (2007) ===
No.	Title	Original release date	Viewers (millions)
1	"Natasha Kaplinsky"	6 September 2007	6.78
2	"John Hurt"	13 September 2007	5.80
3	"Griff Rhys Jones"	20 September 2007	5.75
4	"Carol Vorderman"	27 September 2007	6.53
5	"Alistair McGowan"	4 October 2007	6.17
6	"Graham Norton"	11 October 2007	6.88
7	"Matthew Pinsent"	18 November 2007	6.57

=== Series 5 (2008) ===
No.	Title	Original release date	Viewers (millions)
1	"Patsy Kensit"	13 August 2008	7.10
2	"Boris Johnson"	20 August 2008	7.04
3	"Jerry Springer"	27 August 2008	6.71
4	"Esther Rantzen"	3 September 2008	6.44
5	"Ainsley Harriott"	10 September 2008	6.70
6	"David Suchet"	17 September 2008	6.79
7	"Jodie Kidd"	24 September 2008	5.87
8	"Laurence Llewelyn-Bowen"	29 September 2008	4.72

=== Series 6 (2009) ===
No.	Title	Original release date	Viewers (millions)
1	"Rory Bremner"	2 February 2009	6.44
2	"Fiona Bruce"	9 February 2009	5.86
3	"Rick Stein"	16 February 2009	5.64
4	"Zoë Wanamaker"	23 February 2009	5.82
5	"Kevin Whately"	2 March 2009	5.99
6	"Davina McCall"	15 July 2009	6.92
7	"Chris Moyles"	22 July 2009	5.23
8	"Kate Humble"	29 July 2009	5.19
9	"David Mitchell"	5 August 2009	4.55
10	"Kim Cattrall"	12 August 2009	6.27
11	"Martin Freeman"	19 August 2009	6.48

=== Series 7 (2010) ===
No.	Title	Original release date	Viewers (millions)
1	"Bruce Forsyth"	19 July 2010	7.22
2	"Rupert Everett"	26 July 2010	5.97
3	"Dervla Kirwan"	2 August 2010	5.58
4	"Monty Don"	9 August 2010	5.95
5	"Rupert Penry-Jones"	16 August 2010	5.68
6	"Alexander Armstrong"	23 August 2010	6.46
7	"Jason Donovan"	30 August 2010	5.55
8	"Hugh Quarshie"	6 September 2010	5.42
9	"Alan Cumming"	13 September 2010	5.15

=== Series 8 (2011) ===
No.	Title	Original release date	Viewers (millions)
1	"June Brown"	10 August 2011	6.62
2	"J. K. Rowling"	17 August 2011	7.00
3	"Sebastian Coe"	24 August 2011	5.45
4	"Larry Lamb"	31 August 2011	5.45
5	"Emilia Fox"	7 September 2011	6.06
6	"Alan Carr"	14 September 2011	5.49
7	"Robin Gibb"	21 September 2011	4.37
8	"Richard Madeley"	28 September 2011	5.05
9	"Len Goodman"	5 October 2011	5.03
10	"Tracey Emin"	12 October 2011	Unknown (under 4.21)

=== Series 9 (2012) ===
No.	Title	Original release date	Viewers (millions)
1	"Samantha Womack"	15 August 2012	5.30
2	"Gregg Wallace"	22 August 2012	5.46
3	"Patrick Stewart"	29 August 2012	4.58
4	"Annie Lennox"	5 September 2012	4.86
5	"Hugh Dennis"	12 September 2012	4.87
6	"Alex Kingston"	19 September 2012	4.97
7	"William Roache"	26 September 2012	4.30
8	"Celia Imrie"	10 October 2012	4.89
9	"John Barnes"	17 October 2012	Unknown (under 4.10)
10	"John Bishop"	6 December 2012	5.53

=== Series 10 (2013) ===
No.	Title	Original release date	Viewers (millions)
1	"Una Stubbs"	24 July 2013	5.24
2	"Nigel Havers"	31 July 2013	5.39
3	"Minnie Driver"	7 August 2013	4.95
4	"Lesley Sharp"	14 August 2013	4.52
5	"Gary Lineker"	21 August 2013	5.37
6	"Nick Hewer"	28 August 2013	4.52
7	"Nitin Ganatra"	4 September 2013	4.31
8	"Sarah Millican"	11 September 2013	4.57
9	"Marianne Faithfull"	18 September 2013	3.78
10	"John Simpson"	25 September 2013	3.99

=== Series 11 (2014) ===
No.	Title	Original release date	Viewers (millions)
—	"Who Do They Think They Are?: 10 Years, 100 Shows"	6 August 2014	Unknown (under 3.34)
1	"Julie Walters"	7 August 2014	5.23
2	"Brian Blessed"	14 August 2014	5.31
3	"Tamzin Outhwaite"	21 August 2014	4.94
4	"Brendan O'Carroll"	28 August 2014	6.06
5	"Sheridan Smith"	4 September 2014	4.74
6	"Mary Berry"	11 September 2014	4.75
7	"Martin Shaw"	18 September 2014	5.39
8	"Reggie Yates"	25 September 2014	4.18
9	"Billy Connolly"	2 October 2014	5.74
10	"Twiggy"	9 October 2014	5.33

=== Series 12 (2015) ===
On 23 June 2015, the BBC confirmed the lineup for Series 12, which began on 13 August 2015.

No.	Title	Original release date	Viewers (millions)
1	"Paul Hollywood"	13 August 2015	5.08
2	"Jane Seymour"	20 August 2015	5.14
3	"Derek Jacobi"	27 August 2015	4.68
4	"Jerry Hall"	3 September 2015	4.38
5	"Gareth Malone"	10 September 2015	4.56
6	"Anne Reid"	17 September 2015	4.70
7	"Frank Gardner"	24 September 2015	4.41
8	"Anita Rani"	1 October 2015	4.38
9	"Mark Gatiss"	8 October 2015	Unknown (under 3.80)
10	"Frances de la Tour"	22 October 2015	3.83

=== Series 13 (2016–17) ===
On 13 July 2016, the line-up for the 13th series was confirmed. The series began on 24 November 2016.

No.	Title	Original release date	Viewers (millions)
1	"Danny Dyer"	24 November 2016	5.45
2	"Amanda Holden"	1 December 2016	4.71
3	"Liz Bonnin"	8 December 2016	3.94
4	"Cheryl"	15 December 2016	4.81
5	"Ricky Tomlinson"	22 December 2016	4.28
6	"Ian McKellen"	25 January 2017	4.21
7	"Greg Davies"	1 February 2017	4.63
8	"Warwick Davis"	15 February 2017	5.24
9	"Sunetra Sarker"	22 February 2017	3.97
10	"Sophie Raworth"	8 March 2017	4.45

=== Series 14 (2017) ===
On 23 June 2017, the BBC announced the line-up for the programme's 14th series, which would again comprise 10 episodes.

No.	Title	Original release date	Viewers (millions)
1	"Charles Dance"	6 July 2017	4.32
2	"Craig Revel Horwood"	13 July 2017	4.43
3	"Clare Balding"	20 July 2017	4.83
4	"Adil Ray"	27 July 2017	3.82
5	"Emma Willis"	3 August 2017	4.25
6	"Lulu"	17 August 2017	4.67
7	"Fearne Cotton"	24 August 2017	4.08
8	"Noel Clarke"	31 August 2017	3.48
9	"Lisa Hammond"	7 September 2017	3.71
10	"Ruby Wax"	4 October 2017	4.47

=== Series 15 (2018) ===
On 10 May 2018, the BBC announced the line-up of celebrities taking part in Series 15, which aired during the summer of 2018.

No.	Title	Original release date	Viewers (millions)
1	"Michelle Keegan"	6 June 2018	3.19
2	"Olivia Colman"	9 July 2018	4.19
3	"Lee Mack"	16 July 2018	4.31
4	"Boy George"	25 July 2018	4.54
5	"Shirley Ballas"	30 July 2018	4.36
6	"Marvin Humes"	6 August 2018	4.26
7	"Robert Rinder"	13 August 2018	5.43
8	"Jonnie Peacock"	20 August 2018	3.92

=== Series 16 (2019) ===
On 9 June 2019, the BBC announced the celebrities taking part in Series 16. The line-up features Kate Winslet, Daniel Radcliffe, Sharon Osbourne, Mark Wright, Naomie Harris, Paul Merton, Katherine Ryan and Jack and Michael Whitehall. The series began on 22 July 2019.

No.	Title	Original release date	Viewers (millions)
1	"Daniel Radcliffe"	22 July 2019	5.33
2	"Naomie Harris"	29 July 2019	4.19
3	"Jack and Michael Whitehall"	5 August 2019	5.56
4	"Kate Winslet"	12 August 2019	4.96
5	"Katherine Ryan"	19 August 2019	4.19
6	"Paul Merton"	28 August 2019	4.85
7	"Sharon Osbourne"	4 September 2019	Unknown (under 3.18)
8	"Mark Wright"	11 September 2019	4.26

=== Series 17 (2020) ===
On 23 September 2020, the BBC announced the celebrities taking part in Series 17, consisting of only four episodes as production was halted due to the COVID-19 pandemic. The line-up features Jodie Whittaker, David Walliams, Ruth Jones and Liz Carr.

No.	Title	Original release date	Viewers (millions)
1	"Jodie Whittaker"	12 October 2020	4.79
2	"David Walliams"	19 October 2020	5.36
3	"Ruth Jones"	26 October 2020	4.36
4	"Liz Carr"	2 November 2020	4.62

=== Series 18 (2021) ===
On 13 September 2021, the BBC announced the celebrities taking part in Series 18, consisting of seven episodes. The line-up features Ed Balls, Judi Dench, Pixie Lott, Joe Lycett, Alex Scott, Joe Sugg and Josh Widdicombe. The series began on 12 October 2021.

No.	Title	Original release date	Viewers (millions)
1	"Josh Widdicombe"	12 October 2021	4.34
2	"Judi Dench"	19 October 2021	4.92
3	"Alex Scott"	26 October 2021	3.92
4	"Joe Lycett"	2 November 2021	4.52
5	"Pixie Lott"	9 November 2021	3.70
6	"Joe Sugg"	23 November 2021	Unknown (under 3.50)
7	"Ed Balls"	30 November 2021	3.88

=== Series 19 (2022) ===
On 10 May 2022, the BBC announced the celebrities taking part in Series 19, consisting of five episodes. The line-up features Sue Perkins, Richard Osman, Matt Lucas, Anna Maxwell Martin and Ralf Little. The series began on 26 May 2022.

No.	Title	Original release date	Viewers (millions)
1	"Sue Perkins"	26 May 2022	3.28
2	"Richard Osman"	9 June 2022	4.24
3	"Matt Lucas"	16 June 2022	4.08
4	"Anna Maxwell Martin"	23 June 2022	3.78
5	"Ralf Little"	30 June 2022	3.45

=== Series 20 (2023) ===
On 5 May 2023, the BBC announced the celebrities taking part in Series 20. The line-up features Emily Atack, Kevin Clifton, Claire Foy, Dev Griffin, Bear Grylls, Lesley Manville, Chris Ramsey, Chris & Xand van Tulleken and Andrew Lloyd Webber. The series began on 1 June 2023.

No.	Title	Original release date	Viewers (millions)
1	"Andrew Lloyd Webber"	1 June 2023	2.87
2	"Claire Foy"	8 June 2023	2.84
3	"Bear Grylls"	15 June 2023	3.23
4	"Kevin Clifton"	22 June 2023	3.32
5	"Chris and Xand van Tulleken"	29 June 2023	3.54
6	"Emily Atack"	6 July 2023	Unknown (under 2.26)
7	"Dev Griffin"	13 July 2023	2.47
8	"Chris Ramsey"	20 July 2023	2.81
9	"Lesley Manville"	27 July 2023	3.13

=== Series 21 (2024) ===
On 11 June 2024, the BBC announced the celebrities taking part in Series 21, in commemoration of the programme's twentieth anniversary. The line-up features Rose Ayling-Ellis, Melanie C, Gemma Collins, Jessica Ennis-Hill, Vicky McClure, Paddy McGuinness and Olly Murs.

No.	Title	Original release date	Viewers (millions)
1	"Vicky McClure"	15 August 2024	3.249
2	"Paddy McGuinness"	22 August 2024	3.438
3	"Melanie C"	29 August 2024	3.071
4	"Rose Ayling-Ellis"	5 September 2024	2.972
5	"Jessica Ennis-Hill"	12 September 2024	3.17
6	"Olly Murs"	19 September 2024	2.91
7	"Gemma Collins"	26 September 2024	2.45

=== Series 22 (2025) ===
On 21 March 2025, the BBC announced the celebrities taking part in Series 22. The line-up features Aisling Bea, Andrew Garfield, Mishal Husain, Ross Kemp, Diane Morgan, Fred Sirieix, Layton Williams and Will Young.

No.	Title	Original release date	Viewers (millions)
1	"Andrew Garfield"	22 April 2025	2.59
2	"Mishal Husain"	29 April 2025	2.61
3	"Ross Kemp"	6 May 2025	2.95
4	"Layton Williams"	12 May 2025	2.13
5	"Aisling Bea"	20 May 2025	2.60
6	"Fred Sirieix"	27 May 2025	2.80
7	"Will Young"	3 June 2025	3.15
8	"Diane Morgan"	10 June 2025	2.43

=== Series 23 (2026) ===
On 30 March 2026, the BBC announced the celebrities taking part in Series 23. The line-up features Adeel Akhtar, Zoe Ball, Amy Dowden, Ruth Madeley, Katarina Johnson-Thompson, Toby Jones, Joe Swash and Harriet Walter.

No.	Title	Original release date	Viewers (millions)
1	"Zoe Ball"	26 May 2026	N/A
2	"Amy Dowden"	2 June 2026	N/A
3	"Joe Swash"	9 June 2026	N/A
4	"Ruth Madeley"	9 July 2026	N/A
5	"Toby Jones"	16 July 2026	N/A
6	"Adeel Akhtar"	23 July 2026	N/A
7	"Harriet Walter"	30 July 2026	N/A
8	"Katarina Johnson-Thompson"	6 August 2026	N/A

== Home media ==
Series 1–11, 13, 15-17 of Who Do You Think You Are? are all available on Region 2 DVD.

A box set of series 1–4 is available, distributed by Acorn Media UK.
