= Jan Rembowski =

Polish painter (1879–1923)

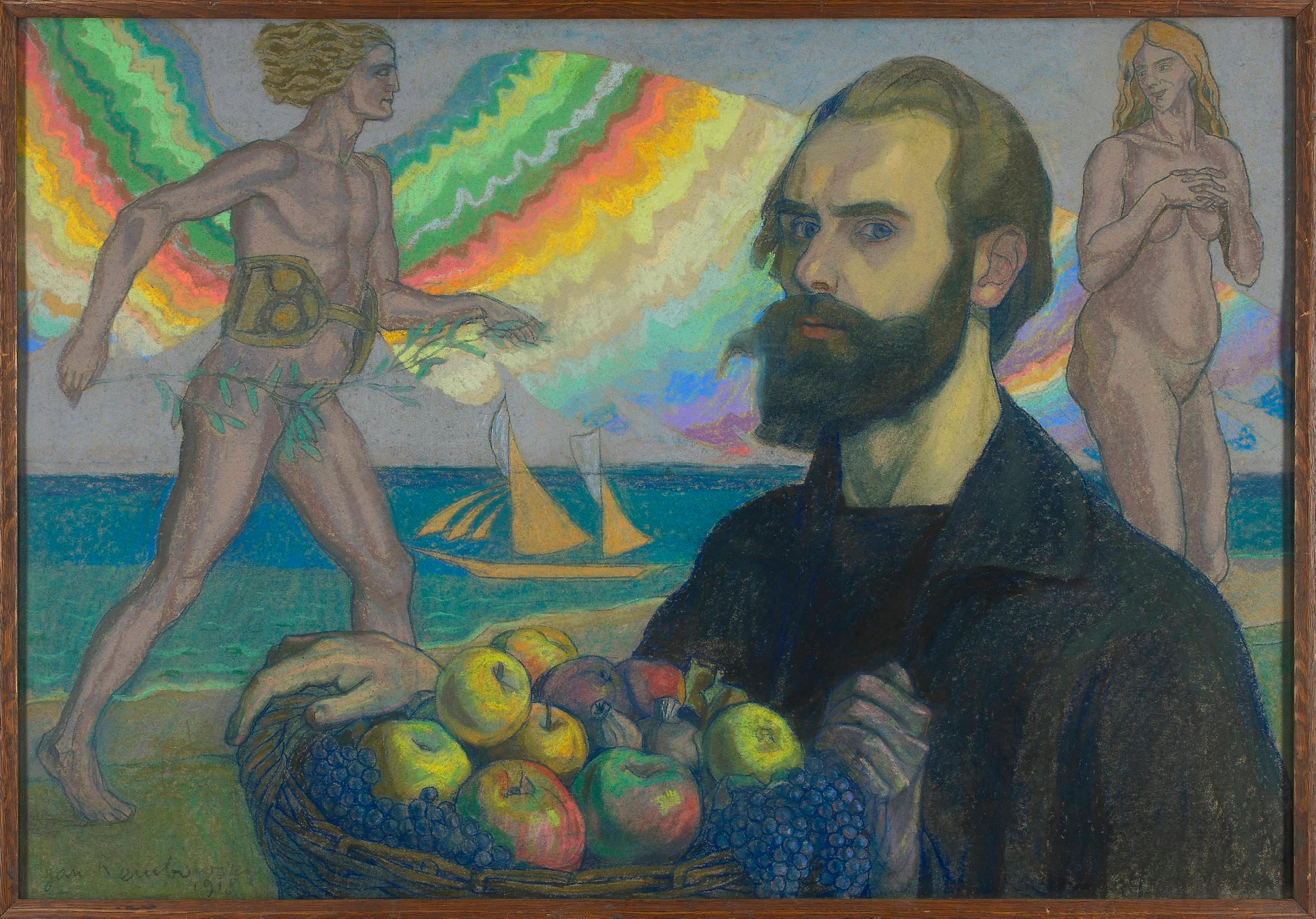
Self-portrait by the Sea with a Basket of Fruit (1918)

Jan Rembowski (12 January 1879 in Warsaw – 26 January 1923 in Warsaw) was a Polish Symbolist painter, pastelist and sculptor. He was also associated with Art Nouveau.

== Biography ==
His father was a landlord and had been a participant in the January Uprising. He took his first drawing lessons from Wojciech Gerson, then studied sculpture at the Kraków Academy of Fine Arts with Konstanty Laszczka. In 1905, he married a French woman, who was there teaching the language, and had two daughters; one of whom, Hanna Rembowska, became an illustrator.

From 1905 to 1907, he studied painting with Józef Mehoffer. During that time, he helped found the "Group of Five" (or "Group Norwid", after Cyprian Norwid) with Leopold Gottlieb, Wlastimil Hofman, Mieczysław Jakimowicz and Witold Wojtkiewicz. The group promoted the idea of a connection between literature, music and the visual arts. He also helped create a group called "Sztuka Podhalańska" in Zakopane, where he often went for his health (he had had tuberculosis). Despite this, he served in the Polish Legions during World War I.

As his health worsened, he had to give up sculpture, as it required too much effort. In addition to paintings, he created interior designs; notably at the sanatorium operated by Dr. Kazimierz Dłuski (1910). He also wrote essays on the folk culture of Podhale and did illustrations for the first edition of a popular alphabet book by Marian Falski, Elementarz. He exhibited frequently and widely until 1920.

Much of his work was destroyed during World War II.

== Selected works ==
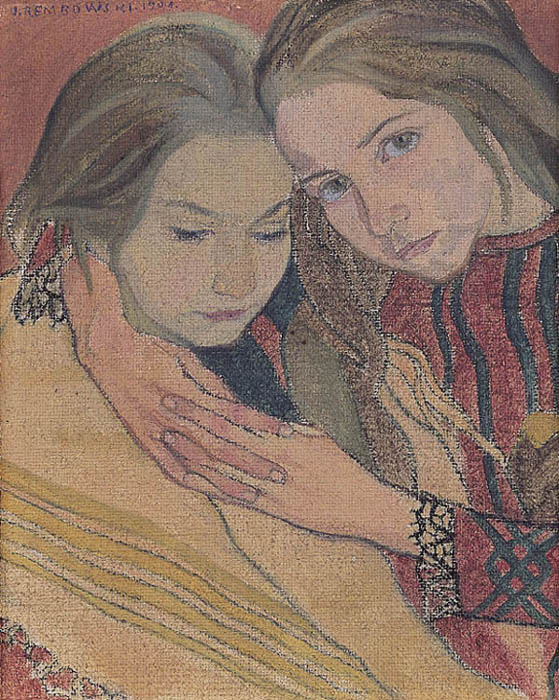
Two Girls, 1904

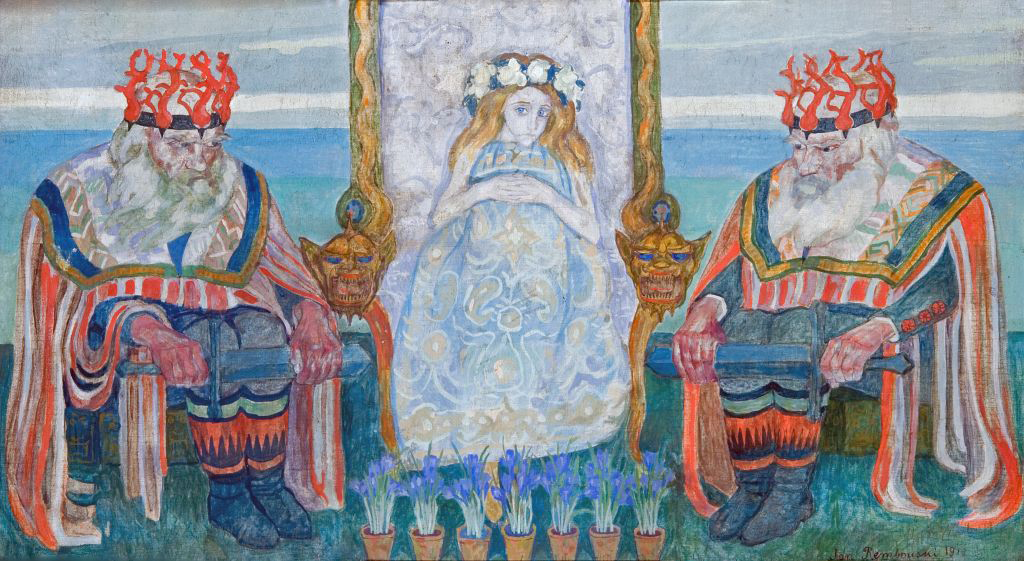
Enchanted Maiden, 1913

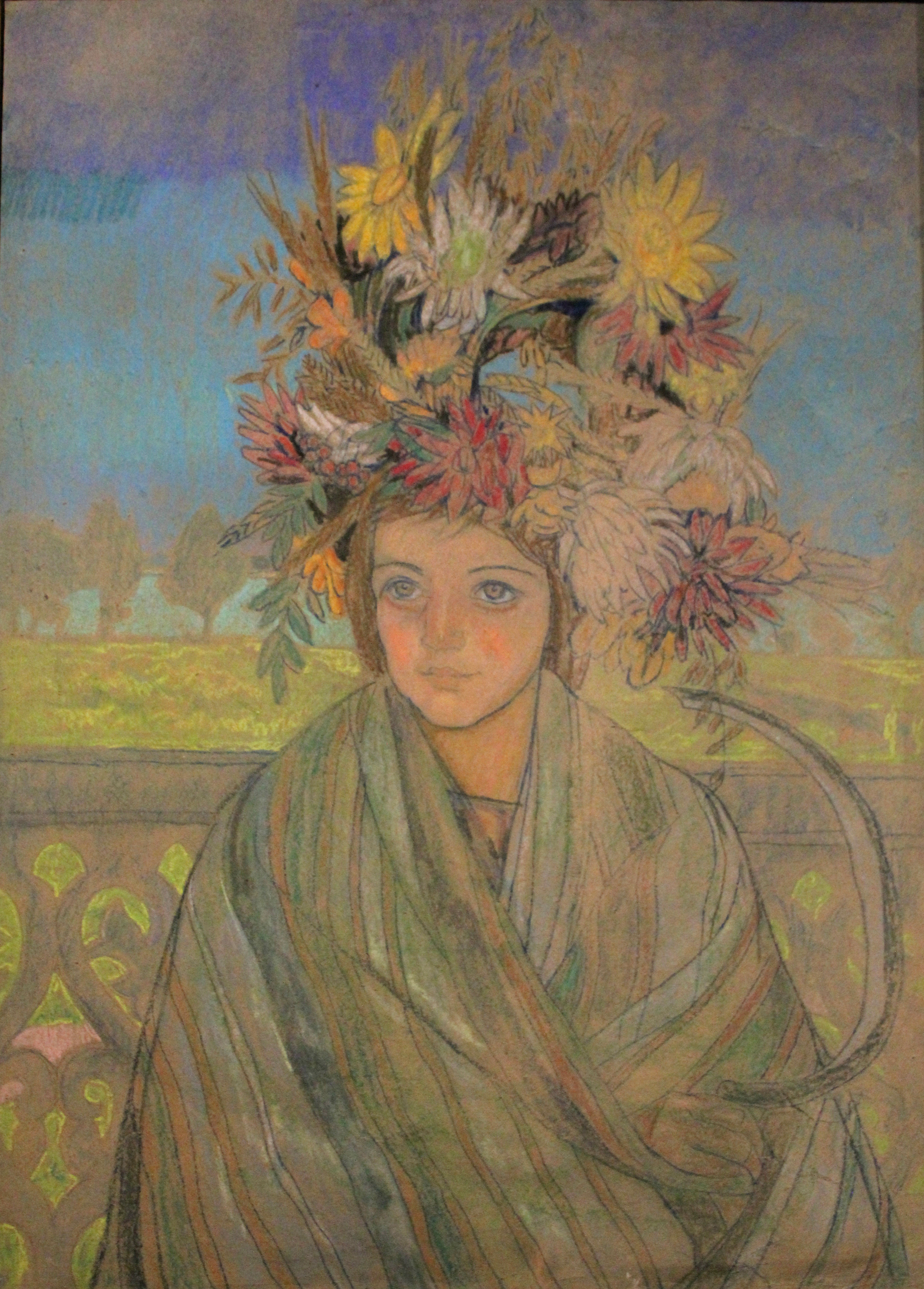
Summer (Allegory of Summer), 1918-22

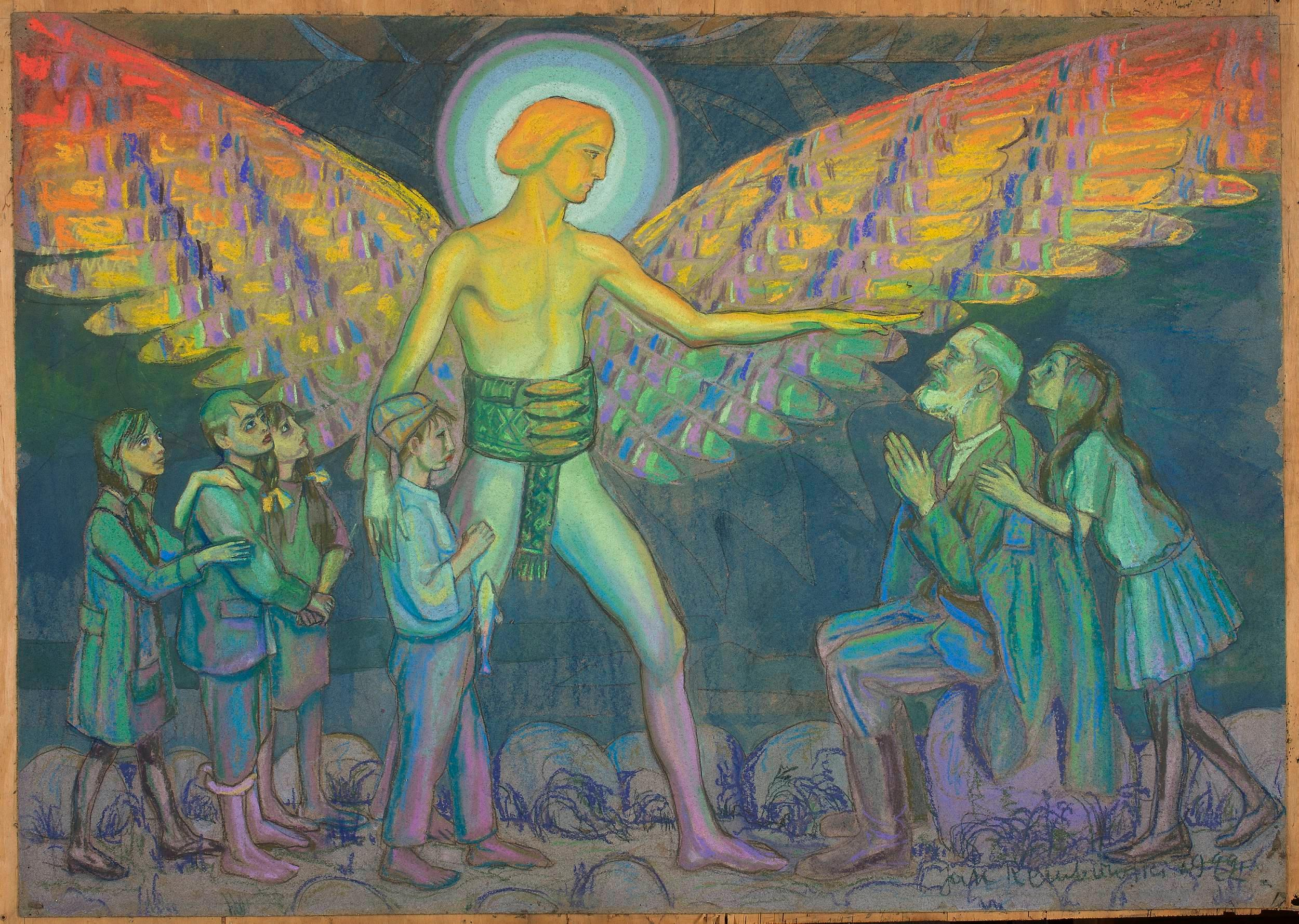
The Return of Tobias, 1919

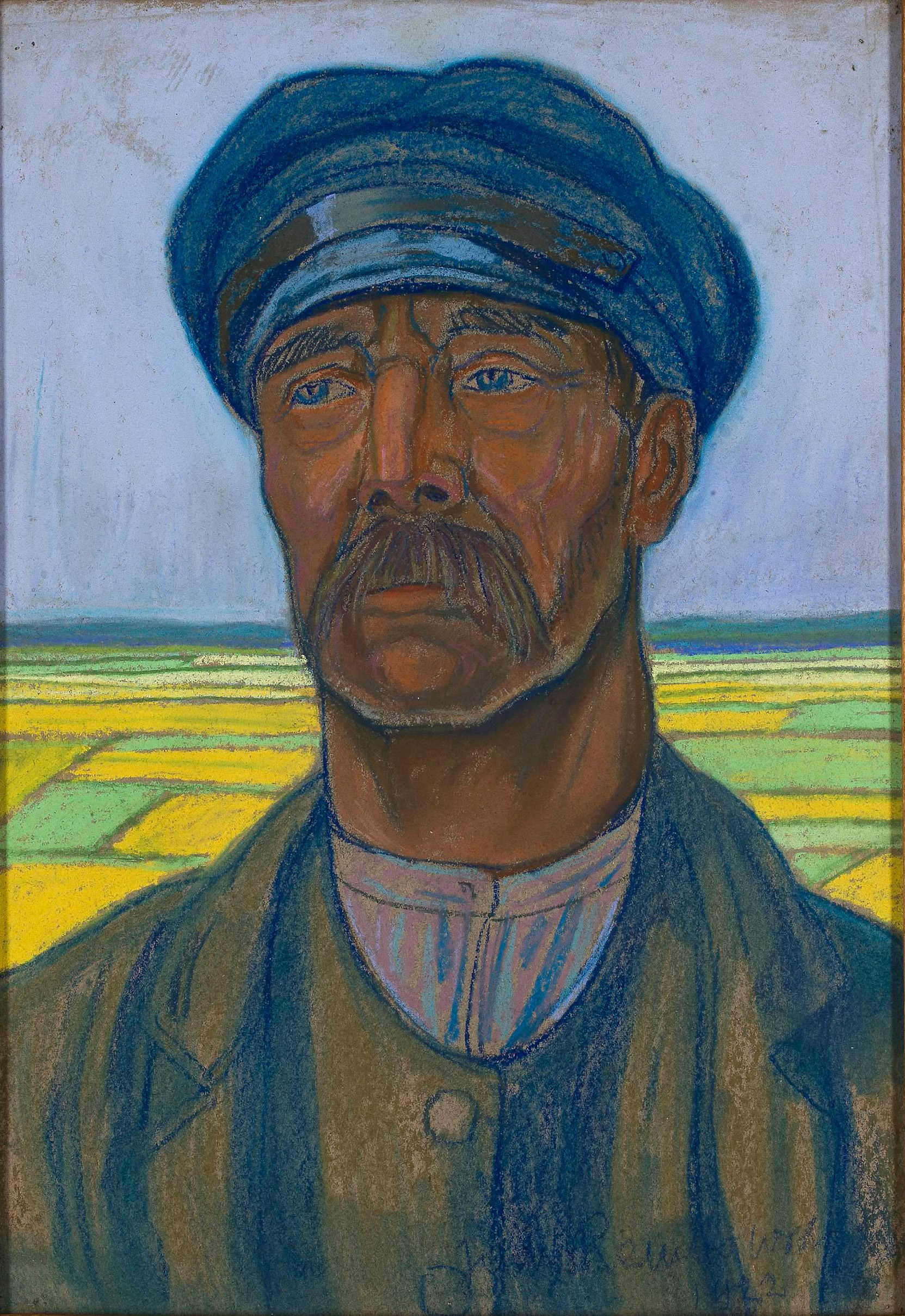
Portrait of a Peasant, 1919

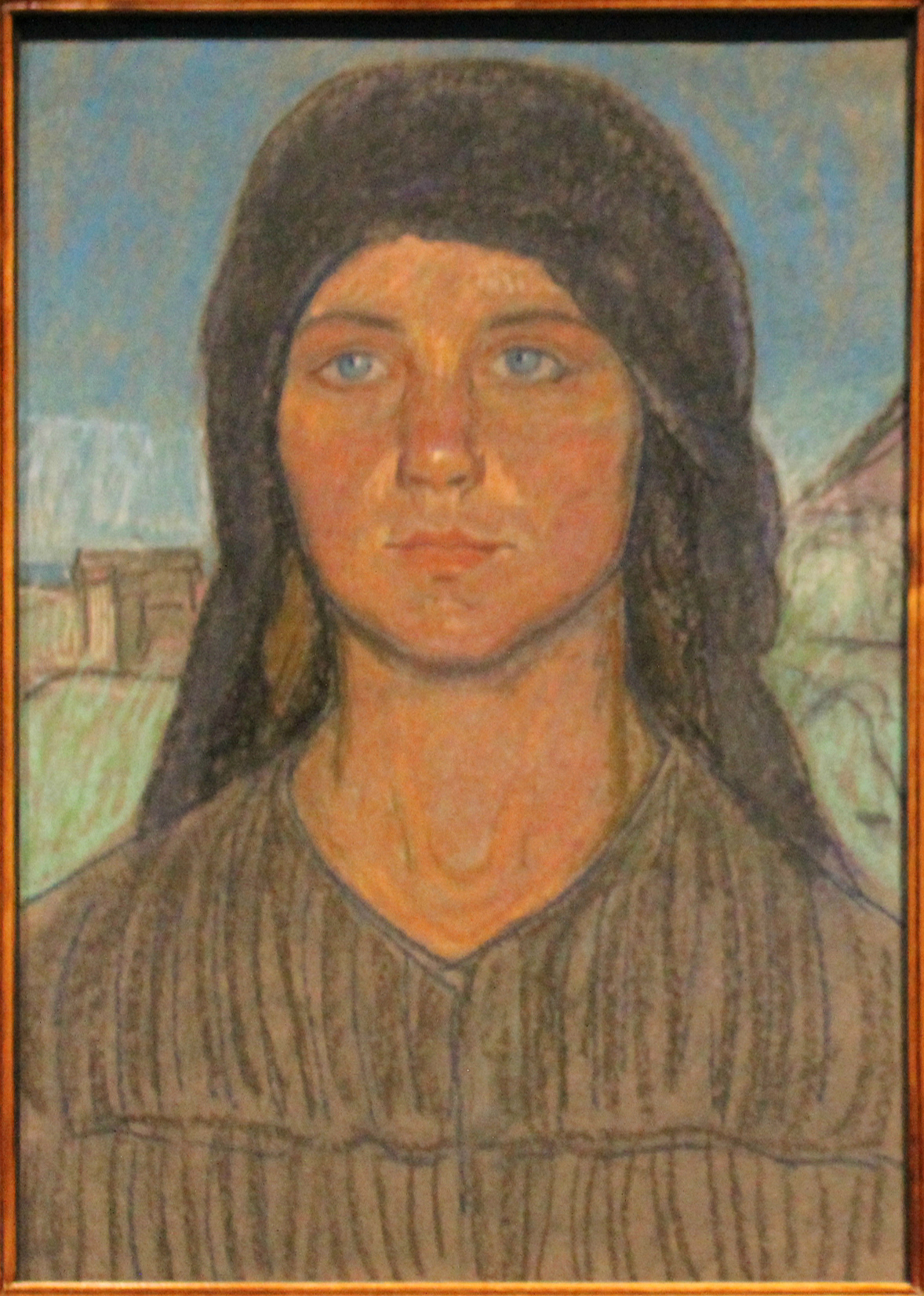
Portrait of a Peasant Woman, 1919

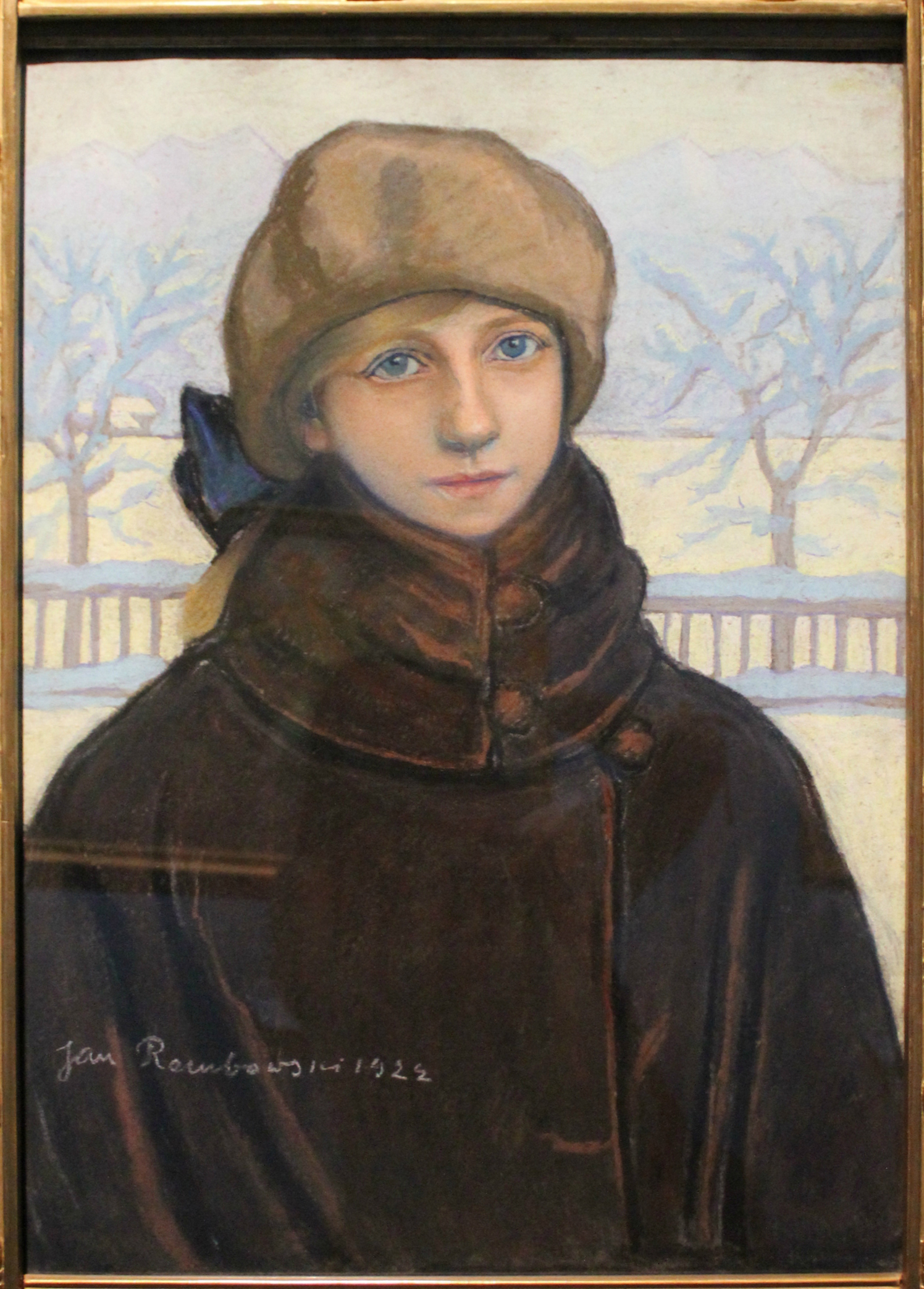
Portrait of Kazimiera Nehring against a Winter Landscape, 1922
