= Elementarz =

Polish alphabet book

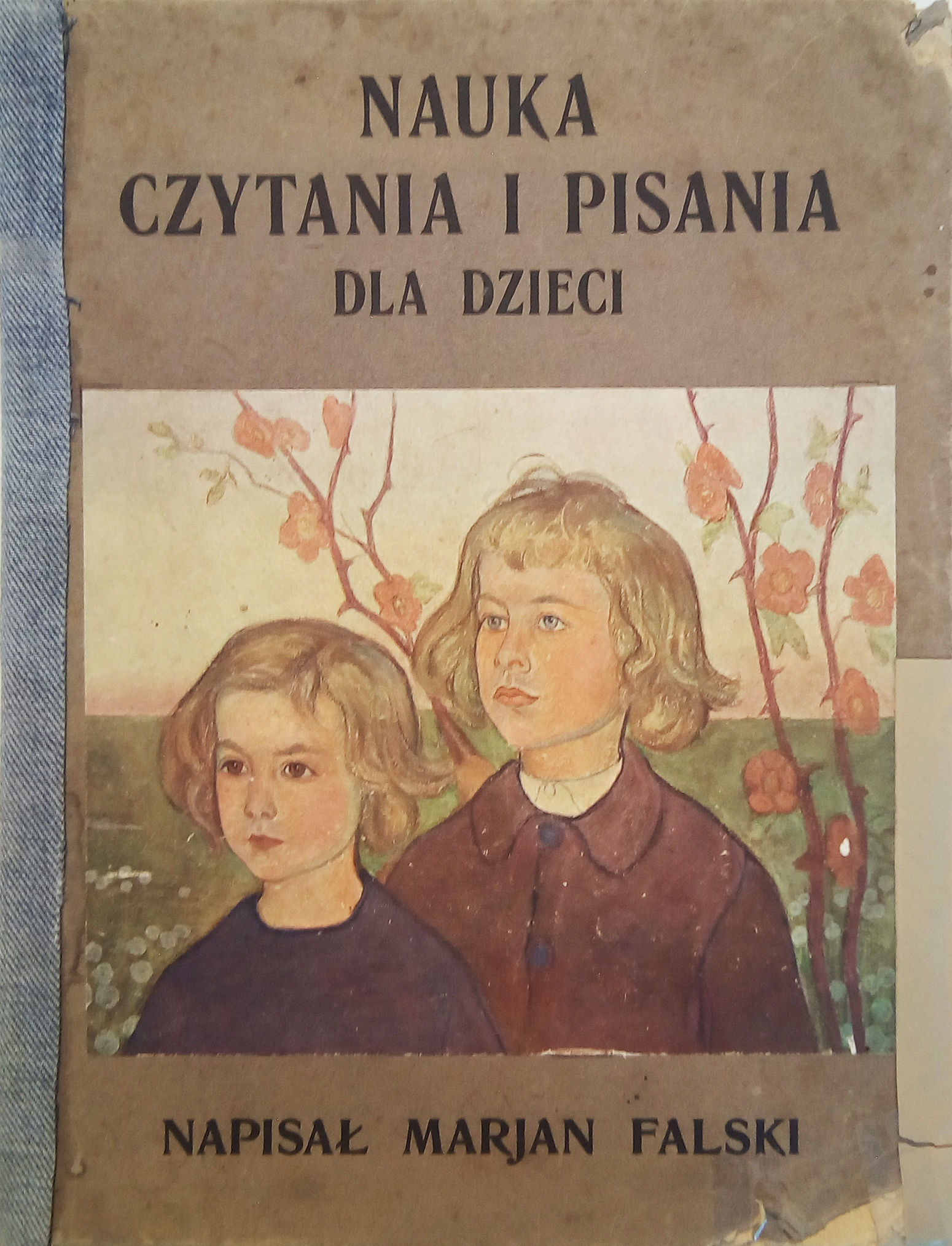
- Cover of the first edition (1910)
- Author: Marian Falski
- Illustrator: Jan Rembowski
- Language: Polish
- Subject: early school education
- Publisher: Tadeusz Wierzbowski Publishing House
- Publication date: 1910
- Media type: alphabet book

Elementarz is a Polish language textbook by Marian Falski for teaching reading and writing to young children. The first edition, titled Nauka czytania i pisania dla dzieci (Learning to Read and Write for Children), was published in 1910 in Kraków and revolutionized the methodology of reading instruction in Poland. It was illustrated by Jan Rembowski. It was released in many versions and numerous reprints. It became the most frequently published Polish alphabet book and the longest-running publication of its kind in the world.

== History ==
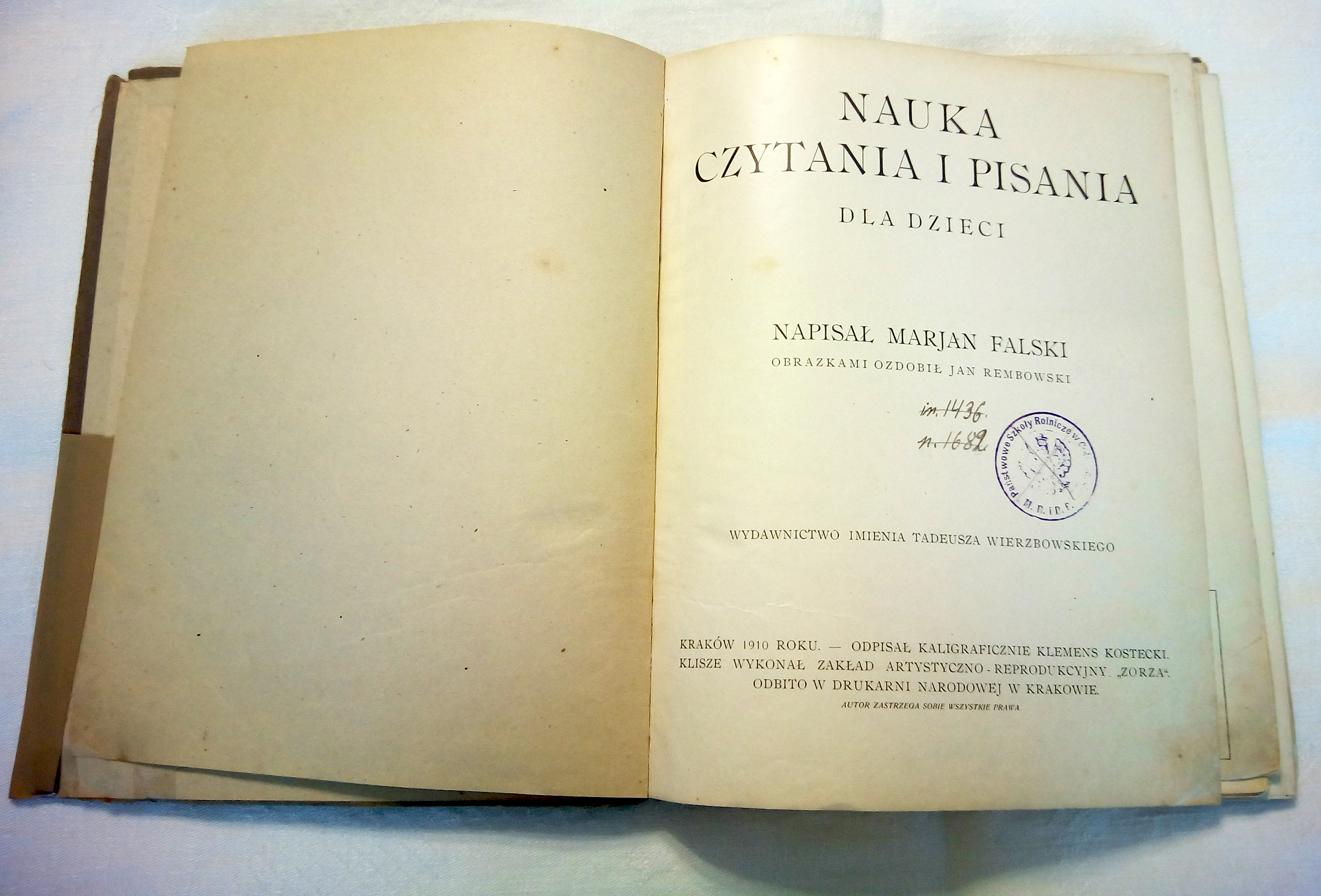
Nauka czytania i pisania dla dzieci by Marian Falski (1910)

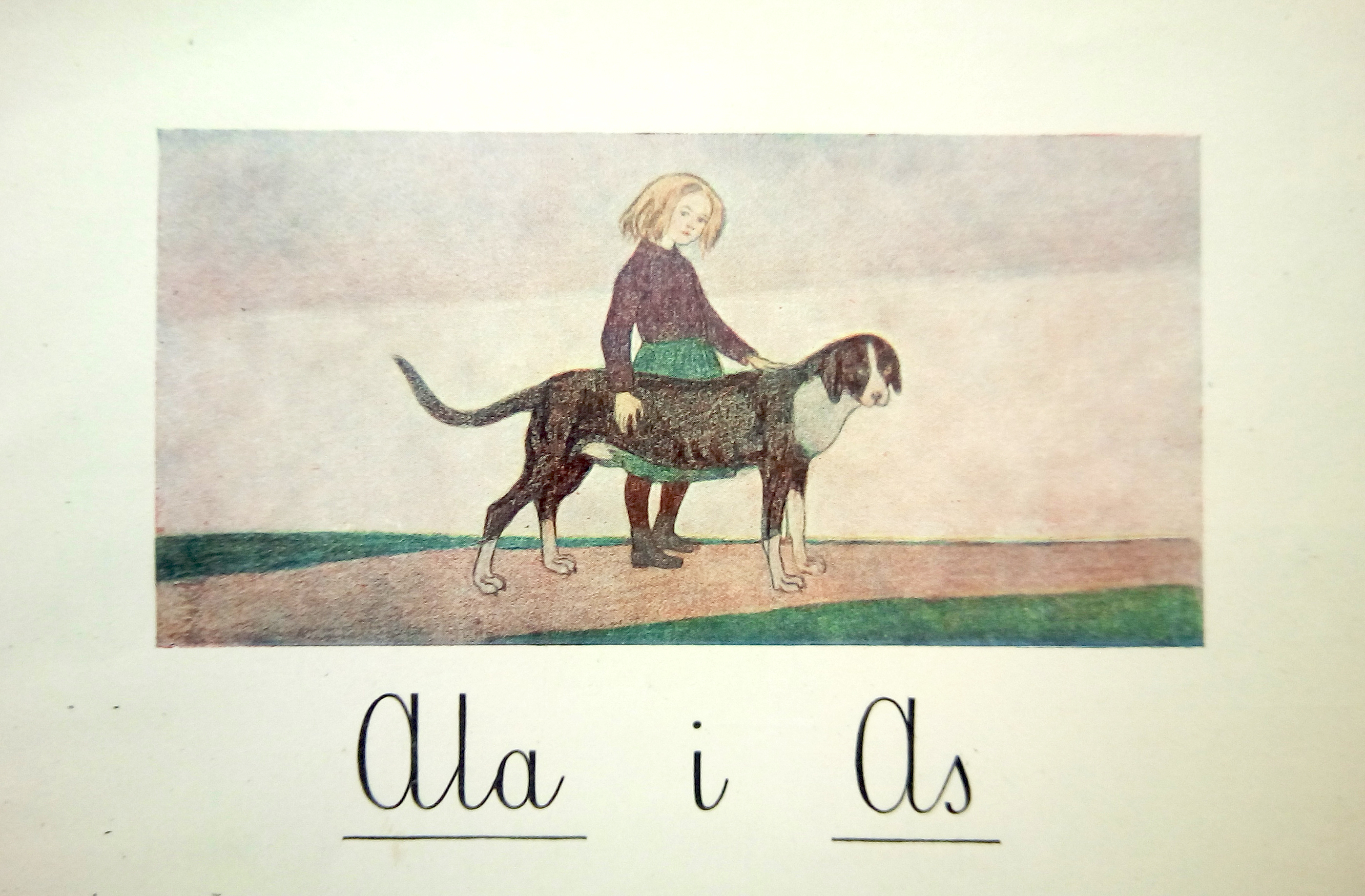
Illustration by Jan Rembowski from Nauka czytania i pisania dla dzieci (1910)

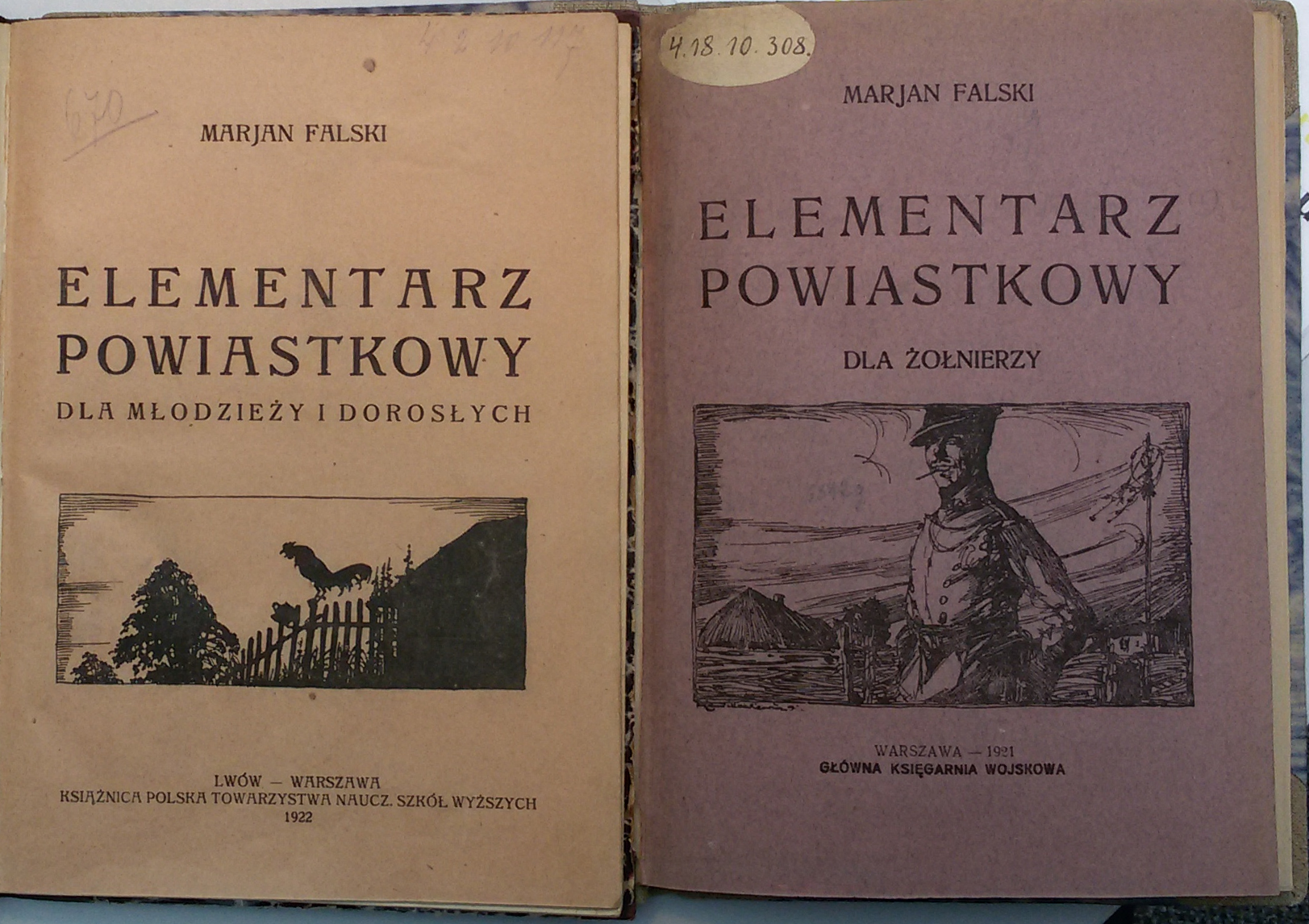
Title pages: civil alphabet book on the left, soldier's on the right

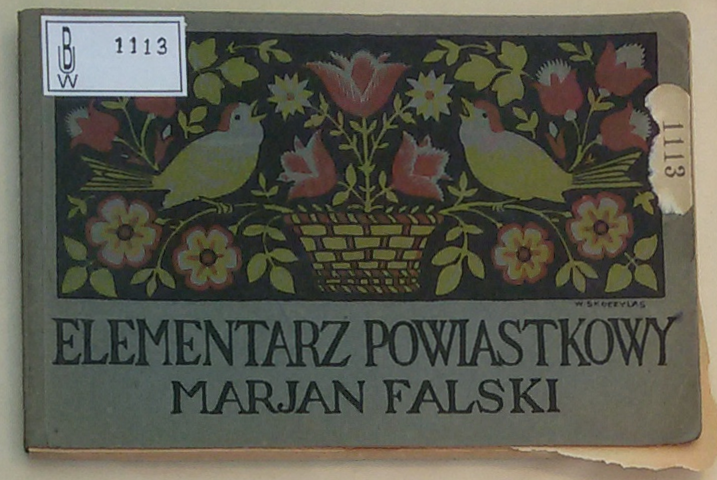
Cover of the 1927 edition of Elementarz by Władysław Skoczylas

Marian Falski trained as an engineer, and gained his pedagogical experience by taking care of a friend's son for two years. It was during this time that he noticed certain patterns in the development of children's reading and writing skills, which he later applied in writing his reading and writing textbook.

The first edition was released in 1910 under the title Nauka czytania i pisania (Learning to Read and Write). In this version, the author used the whole-word recognition method on the first several pages. However, studies he conducted from 1910 to 1920 showed that this method had little educational value. As a result, in the next edition released in 1921, titled Elementarz powiastkowy dla dzieci (Story Alphabet Book for Children), he abandoned this approach in favor of word analysis and synthesis. To do this, he created texts with short, linguistically simple words that were repeated frequently to build reading habits. During the interwar period, several versions were released: for urban and rural children, soldiers, and illiterate civilians. In the soldier's version, the main characters were Tomek, Jacek, and Adam, and the text included military terms like "company", "sapper", "corporal", and "recruits".

In 1945, the State Publishing House for School Books (later Wydawnictwa Szkolne i Pedagogiczne) acquired the rights to publish Falski's Elementarz under the title Elementarz dla szkół wiejskich (Aplhabet Book for Rural Schools). The first post-war edition was illustrated by Jan Samuel Miklaszewski. In 1949, the first post-war edition for children was released, rewritten, censored, and incorporating elements of the mandatory communist ideology of the time (though without mentioning Stalin). Compared to equivalents from other Eastern Bloc countries, the propaganda was moderate, but it still touched on social issues. Texts about the destroyed Warsaw and the return of people to their homes after the war were also included. This edition was the first unified textbook for both urban and rural children and was adopted as a mandatory text. This, in effect, monopolized the alphabet book market.

In the 1950s, the alphabet book was evaluated by the Pedagogical Institute, which, among other things, wanted to change the shape of the letters. However, these changes were never implemented. In the 1930s, the alphabet book had begun including religious topics – a drawing of a church and a text about painting Easter eggs. These elements were ultimately removed in 1949 by communist censorship, with only the text about decorating the Christmas tree remaining, but stripped of its religious context.

A further updated version was released in 1958, featuring new, first-time color illustrations. It included texts by Aleksander Fredro and Julian Tuwim. Moreover, topics related to Bolesław Bierut, Konstantin Rokossovsky, Young Pioneers, and Nowa Huta were no longer present. This edition lasted for 17 years, even though Falski himself demanded an update of the alphabet book. The next version from 1969 introduced new life elements, such as space travel. The final version was released in 1974, after the author's death, with more modern illustrations by Janusz Grabiański. The texts were also updated. The last edition came out in 1982. Besides the latest edition, the alphabet book from 1971 was also reprinted in the 21st century.

== Methodology ==
Elementarz was developed based on the word-analytic method, with the word serving as the starting point. Contrary to widespread belief, Falski's alphabet book was not the first Polish alphabet book to use the word method in early education. 100 years earlier, in 1816, a alphabet book titled Początki czytania dla dzieci bez ABC i zgłoskowania (Beginnings of Reading for Children Without ABC and Syllabication), using this method, was published in Vilnius. It was authored by the German pedagogue Friedrich Gedike and translated and adapted to Polish by Jan Bobrowski. The word method is one of the global methods, which were justified by the theory of Gestalt psychology that emerged at the end of the 19th century. These methods emphasized perceiving the whole over parts and focused on whole elements, such as sentences, their parts, or words. The names of these methods – sentence method or word method – come from which element they focused on. The word-analytic method popularized by Falski in the first half of the 20th century significantly influenced the methodology of early education in Poland. During the interwar period and after the war, a number of alphabet books using this method were released, which were clearly inspired by Falski's Elementarz.

The word-analytic method assumed that a student should first visually perceive the entire word, bypassing syllable division. Only after becoming familiar with words does the student realize that they are composed of phonemes and letters. Therefore, in the first part of the alphabet book, there were texts in which letters strictly corresponded to sounds. Words whose spelling differed from pronunciation, being more difficult, were placed in the later part of the book.

The principles of the textbook were as follows:

- Teaching should begin not with letters, but with simple sentences.
- Children learn letters and phonemes by analyzing words.
- The text should consist only of words the child is familiar with.
- Words should be short, mostly monosyllabic.
- A drawing is an essential element of teaching reading.
- Teaching should begin with written, not printed text.

Falski broke the last rule in later editions, but left the written models, and in the 1975 edition (a year after his death), he introduced some innovations by teaching both printed and written letters, both uppercase and lowercase.

Studies conducted before 1957 confirmed the effectiveness of Falski's method. In a group of 413 students, only five errors were made in dictation and writing from memory. In traditional dictation, there were 100 errors, 42 of which involved incorrect spelling of lowercase and uppercase letters. During the same period, in dictations from students in fifth grade, one error was noted for every 10–12 words. In 2008, a student in third or fourth grade made an average of one error for every 3–4 words.

== Elementarz in culture ==
The most famous sentence from Elementarz by Falski was "Ala ma kota" ("Ala has a cat"), which became a symbol of the textbook in colloquial Polish. However, this sentence only appeared in Elementarz from the 1930s to 1949. The title "Ala" from the textbook is used in the memoirs of Alina Margolis-Edelman, which inspired the monodrama Ala z elementarza (Ala from the ABCs) by Zuzanna Fijewska-Malesza, directed by Agnieszka Glińska, which premiered in 2011.

The phrase "Ala ma kota" was also used by Jan Brzechwa to name a fictional land in Tryumf pana Kleksa (The Triumph of Mr. Kleks).

In 2014, Elementarz was adapted into a play for preschool children, directed by Michał Zadara, and premiered at the Teatr Nowy in Warsaw.

In 1978, based on Elementarz and illustrations by Jerzy Karolak, a short film titled Elementarz by Krzysztof Krauze was produced at the Studio Miniatur Filmowych in Warsaw, with music by Andrzej Korzyński. The film, starting with the illustrations and texts from the book, uses materials from Warsaw Documentary Film Studio to depict the characters' lives as adults and their approaching old age. It thus creates a socio-psychological portrait of a Polish family in the late 1970s.
