= Witold Wojtkiewicz =

Polish painter, illustrator and printmaker

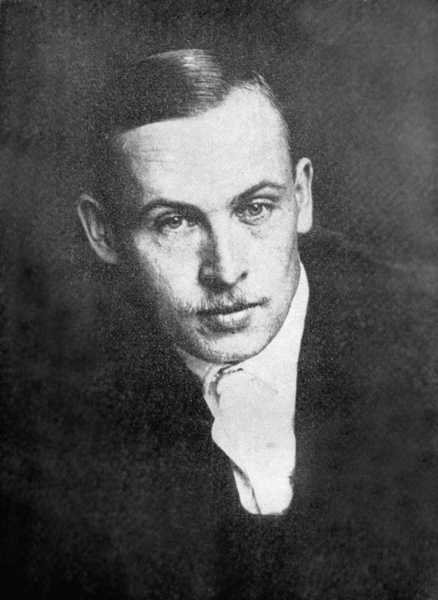
- Photographic self-portrait (date unknown)
- Born: 29 December 1879; Warsaw
- Died: 14 June 1909 (aged 29); Warsaw
- Education: Warsaw School of Drawing; Academy of Fine Arts in Kraków
- Known for: Painting, illustration, printmaking
- Movement: Young Poland, Expressionism, Symbolism

Witold Wojtkiewicz (29 December 1879 – 14 June 1909) was a Polish painter, illustrator and printmaker. Although generally considered an Expressionist, some of his works are precursors of Surrealism.

== Biography ==
He came from a family of eleven children. His father was the chief cashier at Bank Handlowy and did not support Witold's desire to become an artist. Nevertheless, he was able to enroll at the Warsaw school of drawing, where he studied with Jan Kauzik. After a brief attempt to study at the Imperial Academy of Arts, he continued at the Kraków Academy of Fine Arts from 1903 to 1904 with Leon Wyczółkowski; supporting himself by doing illustrations for the short-lived satirical magazine, Liberum Veto.

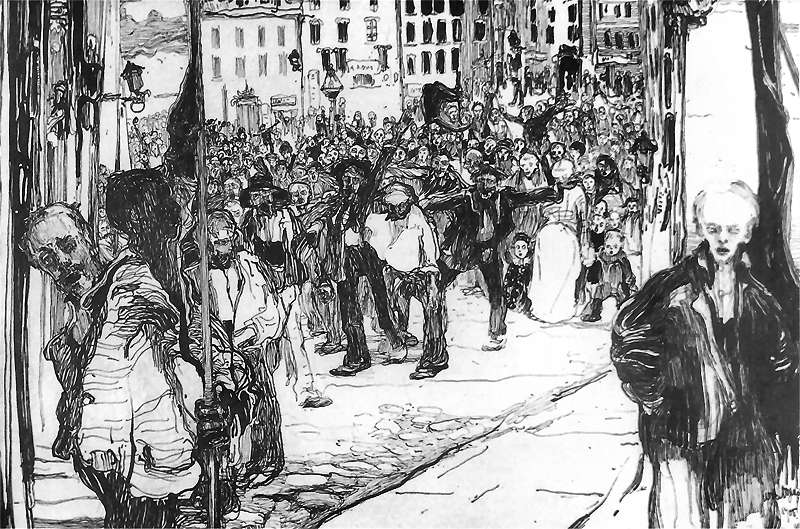
Demonstration (1905)

In 1905, he was a witness to the Warsaw Uprising, and made some sketches of the event that were widely circulated. Later that year, he became part of the "Grupa Pięciu" (Group of Five), with Leopold Gottlieb, Wlastimil Hofman, Mieczysław Jakimowicz and Jan Rembowski. Three years later, he joined the Society of Polish Artists "Sztuka" and began to exhibit widely throughout Poland and Austria.

He also collaborated with members of the Zielony Balonik cabaret to create watercolors that may still be seen at the Jama Michalika café, and created illustrations for works by his friend, the writer Roman Jaworski, as well as numerous vignettes and illuminated letters for books and postcards.

At an exhibition in Berlin in 1906, he attracted the attention of André Gide, who arranged for a showing in 1907 at the Galerie Druet in Paris and wrote the introduction to the catalog.

By this time his style had darkened due to the suffering from an incurable, congenital heart defect, which led to his death at the age of twenty-nine. At his mother's request, his diary was placed in the coffin with his remains. A major retrospective was held in 1976 at the National Museum, Krakow.

== Selected paintings ==
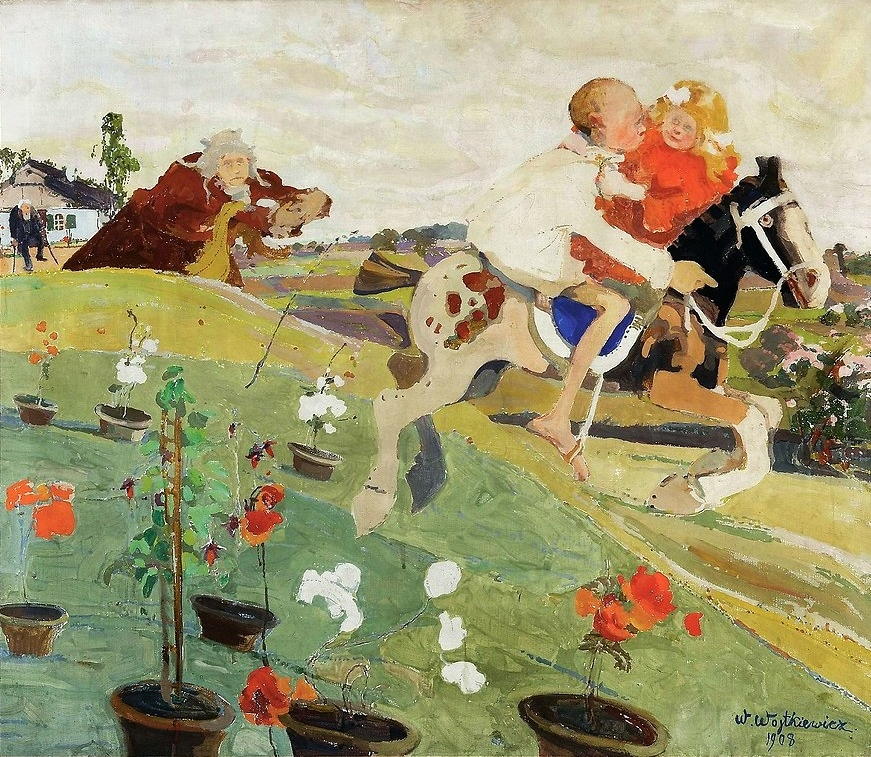
Abduction of the
King's Daughter, National Museum, Warsaw

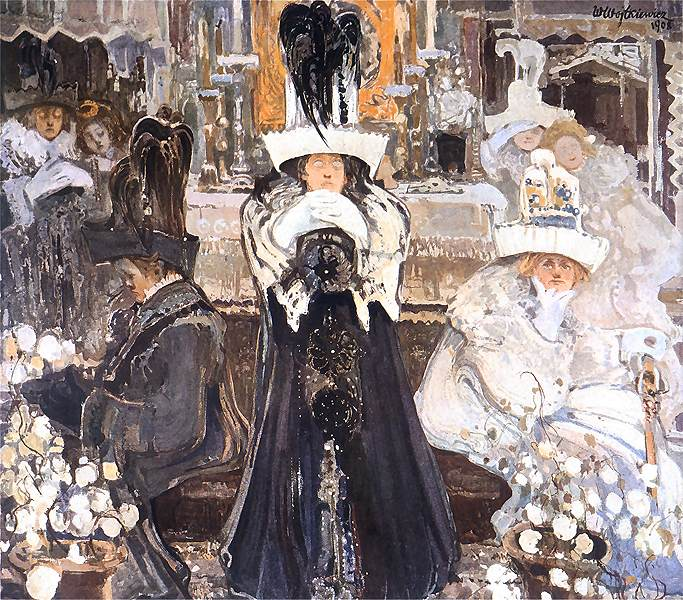
Mediations, Ash Wednesday, National Museum, Kraków

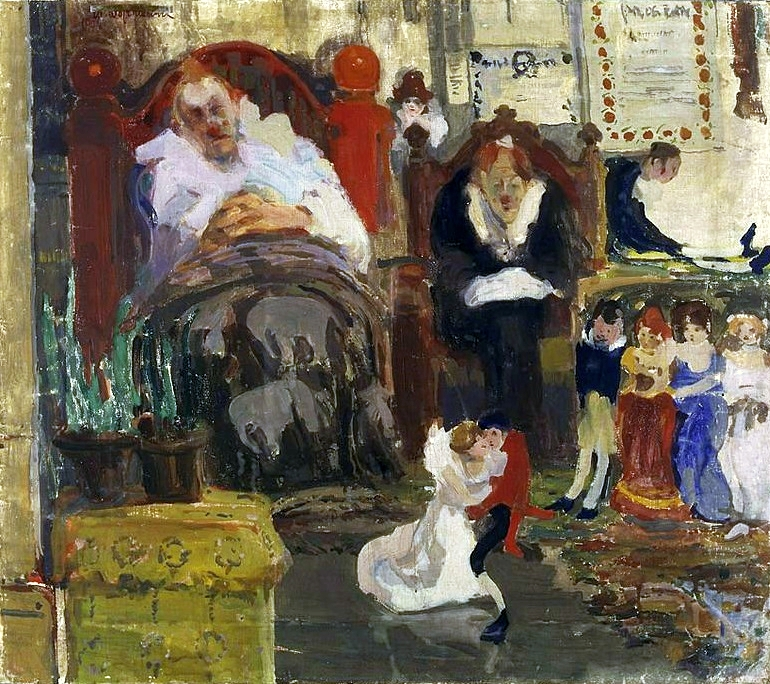
Marionettes, National Museum, Warsaw

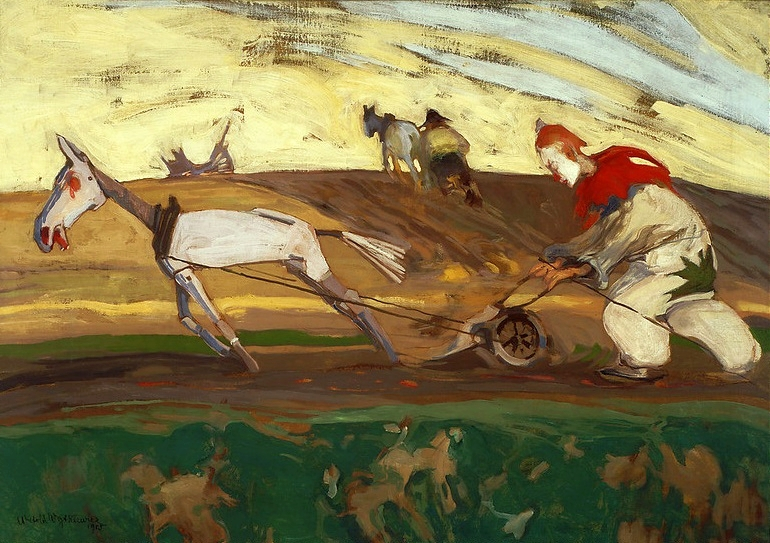
Ploughing, National Museum, Warsaw
