= Saleyha Ahsan =

British medical doctor, presenter and journalist

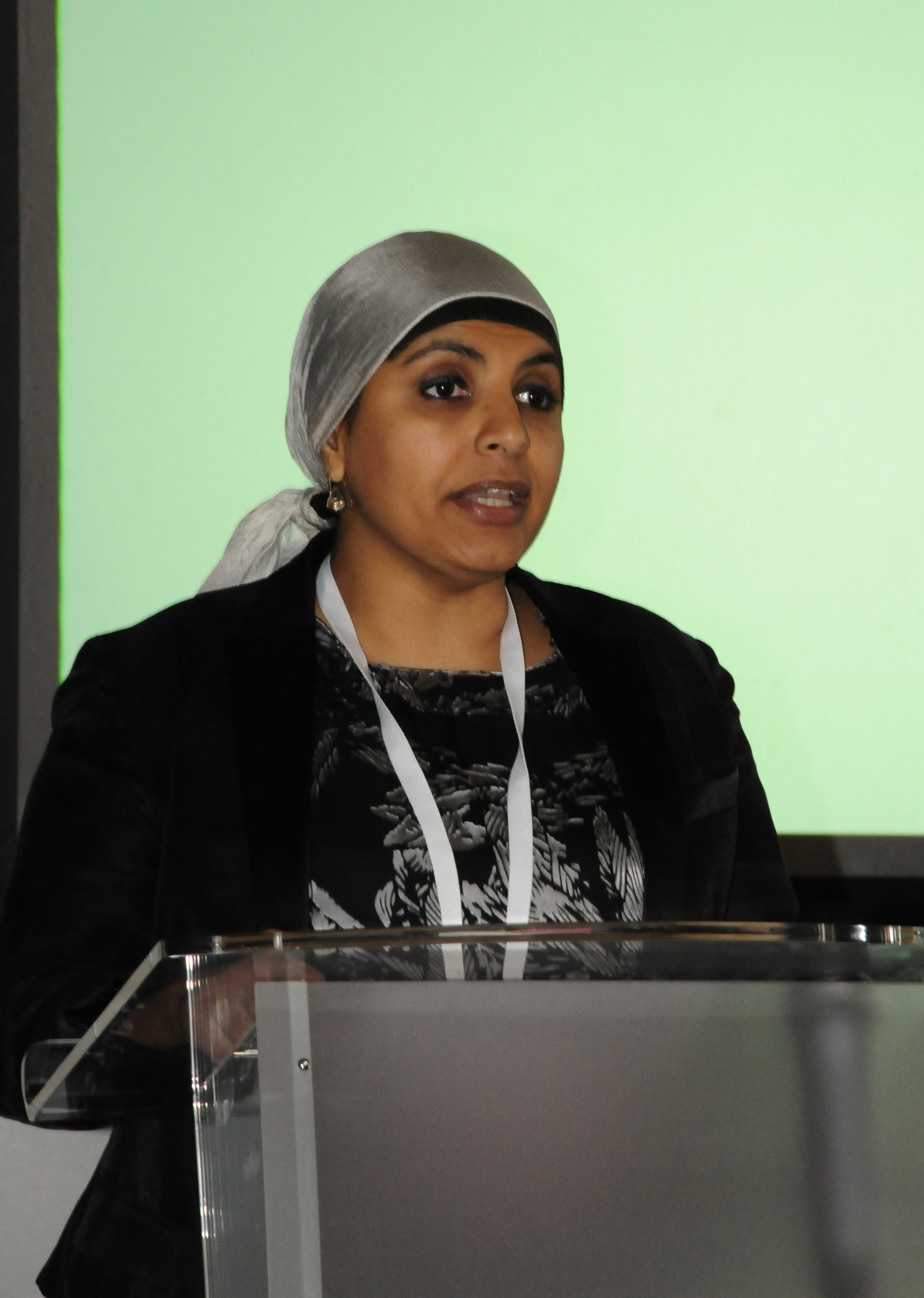
- Ahsan in 2013
- Born: Barking, London, United Kingdom
- Education: University of Dundee School of Medicine
- Occupations: Medical doctor, filmmaker, presenter
- Known for: Trust Me I’m a Doctor, reporting on the COVID-19 pandemic

Saleyha Ahsan is a British physician, presenter and journalist. She has worked as a humanitarian doctor in conflict zones and as an A&E doctor in the UK, presented programmes including Trust Me I’m a Doctor and reported on conflict, social affairs, medicine, healthcare and the COVID-19 pandemic.

== Early life ==
Ahsan was born c. 1970 in Barking, London. Her mother was born in Kenya and her father was born in Pakistan but lived in India before arriving in the UK. She is the eldest of six siblings, all of whom have pursued careers in the National Health Service.

== Career ==
Ahsan graduated with an undergraduate degree in chemistry from the University of Salford.

She was the first British Muslim woman to attend the integrated male and female Royal Military Academy Sandhurst's Officer commissioning course. She achieved the rank of Captain in the British Army, and served in Bosnia as part of the NATO stabilisation force, completing three years in the Royal Army Medical Corps as a Medical Support Officer.

Ahsan qualified as a doctor (MB ChB) in 2006 at the University of Dundee School of Medicine, and gained her LLM in International Human Rights Law and Humanitarian Law in 2011. She worked as a humanitarian doctor in Libya during the Arab Spring in 2011, and then in Syria in 2013.

She works as an Accident and Emergency doctor in Ysbyty Gwynedd hospital, in Bangor, North Wales.

== Media and presenting ==
In 2008 her short film My Mother’s Daughter won Best European Film at Los Angeles film festival, Pangea. In 2018 she appeared on Celebrity Island with Bear Grylls on Channel 4.

Ahsan has presented a number of programmes for Channel 4 and the BBC on the COVID-19 pandemic, including Dispatches - Coronavirus: Can Our NHS Cope? and What’s It Like to Catch Coronavirus? (Channel 4) and The One Show, Panorama, Newsnight, Trust Me I’m a Doctor and Horizon (BBC). She has also worked for The Guardian and ITV. In mid‑January 2022, Ahsan wrote dismissively about the unfolding British government partygate crisis from the perspective of a doctor working in emergency medicine during the UK COVID-19 pandemic.

== Politics ==
Ahsan was a UK European Union Party list candidate for the London constituency in the 2019 European Parliament election. She was the Liberal Democrat candidate for the Milton Keynes South constituency in the 2019 general election. She was the Liberal Democrat candidate in the 2022 elections for Mayor of Newham.

== COVID-19 ==
Ahsan filmed her experiences during the second wave of the COVID-19 pandemic in the United Kingdom for the Channel 4 programme Condition Critical: One Doctor’s Story. During this period, Ahsan lost her father, Ahsan-ul-Haq Chaudry, age 81, after he contracted COVID-19. Ahsan has also spoken about how she was offered a COVID-19 vaccine for her father a week after he died.

Ahsan is a member of the Covid-19 Bereaved Families for Justice group, which advocates for a public inquiry into the UK's pandemic response. She told The Guardian that "You do not need to be a professor of epidemiology to chart ... the week before Christmas when everyone was going out about Christmas shopping to the spike that happened afterwards... That was avoidable and that was the wave that got my dad."
