= Xand van Tulleken =

British doctor and public intellectual

Jonkheer Xand van Tulleken
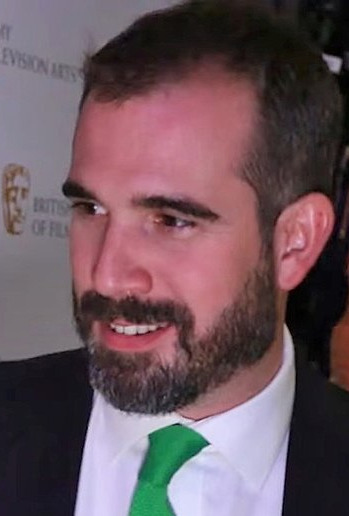
- van Tulleken in 2015
- Born: Alexander Gerald van Hoogenhouck Tulleken; 18 August 1978 (age 48); London, England
- Education: Hill House International Junior School; King's College School, Wimbledon
- Alma mater: Somerville College, Oxford; Liverpool School of Tropical Medicine; Fordham University; Harvard University
- Height: 184 cm (6 ft 0 in)
- Spouse: Dolly Theis (m. 2023)
- Children: 3
- Relatives: Chris van Tulleken

Alexander Gerald van Hoogenhouck-Tulleken (born 18 August 1978) is a British doctor, television presenter, broadcaster, and public intellectual with a specialism in public and global health.

== Early life and education ==
van Tulleken grew up in London to Dutch-Canadian parents. Both Xand and his twin brother Chris attended Hill House preparatory school, and then King's College School in Wimbledon, London. He studied Medicine at Somerville College, Oxford. After qualifying as a Doctor, he specialised in tropical medicine, studying a diploma in tropical medicine from Liverpool School of Tropical Medicine. van Tulleken studied in the United States, firstly a diploma in International Humanitarian Assistance at Fordham University, after which he was a Fulbright scholar at Harvard University, where he earned a Master's degree in public health.

van Tulleken’s younger brother is director Jonathan van Tulleken.

=== Academic positions ===
van Tulleken has taught and spoken in university settings, and holds various honorary academic positions. He held the Helen Hamlyn Senior Fellowship at Fordham University's Institute of International Humanitarian Affairs from 2011 to 2017. van Tulleken is honorary associate professor at University College London's department of Infection & Population Health. He was an editor of the Oxford Handbook of Humanitarian Medicine. In April 2021, he gave the Imperial College London 'Charmian Brinson Honorary Lecture' entitled: 'Camps, Cameras and Coronavirus: how not to communicate in a crisis'.

== Medical career ==
van Tulleken has worked in humanitarian aid and international medicine. As a Junior Doctor, he worked in Darfur during the Darfur genocide, with Médecins du Monde (Doctors of the World). In 2014 he was health reporter for the CNN coverage of the Ebola outbreaks of that year. He has also worked in South America.

== Television career ==
As media personalities, the van Tulleken twins often appear on shows together, but also both have individual appearances on various programmes. They began with Medicine Men go Wild in 2008, and have presented many television shows, most notably Operation Ouch!, Twinstitute, and various documentaries.

=== With Chris van Tulleken ===
- Presenters of Channel 4's Medicine Men go Wild (2008).
- Presenters of CBBC's Operation Ouch! (2012-2021).
- Presenters of BBC Two's Trust Me, I'm A Doctor (2013) alongside Michael Mosley.
- Presenters of both What's The Right Diet for You? A Horizon Special (2015), and also Is Binge Drinking Really That Bad? (2015), testing the effects of sporadic alcohol consumption compared to regular alcohol consumption.
- Appeared on Series 5 of Hacker Time.
- Presented a documentary series called The Twinstitute.
- Presented Surviving the Virus: My Brother & Me (2020). The show explores how Xand was left with an irregular heartbeat after catching COVID.
- Assisted Chris on the first of the 2024 Royal Institution Christmas Lectures.

van Tulleken has individually presented many documentaries, including an episode of Horizon discussing male suicide and the humanitarian side of asylum seekers. He offered up his own body for science experimentation in the diet show How to Lose Weight Well, as well as in BBC Horizon episodes "Sugar vs Fat" and "Is Binge Drinking Really That Bad?"

== Radio and podcasts ==
The van Tulleken twins host A Thorough Examination with Drs Chris and Xand, and is also a member of the Made of Stronger Stuff podcast on BBC Sounds. Other BBC broadcasting appearances include What's up Docs? and A Good Read.

== Personal life ==
van Tulleken is married to Dolly Theis, a visiting researcher at MRC Epidemiology Unit, University of Cambridge and former Conservative Party candidate for Vauxhall in the 2017 general election. He has one son from a previous relationship and another two with his wife, a son born April 2024 and a daughter born November 2025. He rushed out of a recording of What's up Docs after his wife called to inform him she was going into labour.

== Ancestry ==
He is descended from Jan van Hoogenhouck Tulleken (1762–1851), a schout-bij-nacht, a Dutch rear-admiral, who was raised to the nobility with the title of Jonkheer (equivalent of a Baronet). As his descendant, this gives van Tulleken this title as well.

In June 2023, Xand, along with his brother Chris, were the subject of the BBC genealogy programme Who Do You Think You Are?, in which they learned that Jan van Hoogenhouck Tulleken's father, Ambrosius Tulleken, was a wealthy slave trader who had a plantation in Demerara in The Guianas. They also discovered that they are of partial Indonesian descent via the maternal ancestors of their Javanese great-great-great-great-grandmother, Louise de Bruijn, the daughter of engineer Hendrik de Bruijn.
