= Ultra-Processed People =

2023 book by Chris van Tulleken

- Author: Chris van Tulleken
- Language: English
- Publisher: Cornerstone Press
- Publication date: 27 April 2023
- Pages: 384
- ISBN: 978-1-5299-0005-7
- OCLC: 1381127333

Ultra-Processed People: Why Do We All Eat Stuff That Isn't Food... and Why Can't We Stop? is a 2023 non-fiction book by the British doctor Chris van Tulleken. It was published by Cornerstone Press in 2023. A paperback edition was published in 2024 by Penguin Books, with an extra chapter. It discusses ultra-processed food (UPF) and its effects on human health.

Van Tulleken combines anecdotes and personal stories with science through studies and his own experience as a physician specialising in infection and immunity. Topics include the origins of UPF, their economics and their impact. He asserts that UPF is a greater cause of weight gain than sugar or a lack of exercise, and describes psychological and physiological effects of UPF on the human body. He draws from conversations with scientists and experts within the food industry, and calls attention to the failure to rigorously state conflicts of interest in scientific papers regarding food, nutrition and their industries.

Van Tulleken also describes his own experience of living for an extended period on a diet of 80% UPF, with before and after measurements.

== Reception ==
Ultra-Processed People was shortlisted for 2023 Waterstones Book of the Year. It was also long-listed for the Baillie Gifford Prize for Non-Fiction in 2023. In 2024 it won the Fortnum & Mason Debut Food Book Award.

The American food law scholar Jacob Gersen reviewed the book for The New York Times, writing, "Do people eat more when food is cheap, or do they eat more cheap food because the processing that makes it cheap tricks us into eating more? The answer to that question is murky and confounded in van Tulleken’s account, in which food that sickens us is part and parcel of processing-for-profit."

Jerold Mande, former deputy under secretary for food safety at the United States Department of Agriculture, reviewed the book for Harvard Public Health, stating, "The reality is we simply don’t know how ultra-processed foods are linked to chronic diet-related diseases; we only know that they are and that we must invest in research to find out more."

Van Tulleken and Christopher Snowdon have exchanged criticisms regarding the book. In the book, van Tulleken criticised an article by Snowdon about a decline in survey-reported calorie consumption between 1974 and 1990. Van Tulleken pointed to data from "doubly labeled water" studies showing calorie consumption increasing, and concluded that people have become worse at estimating their calorie consumption. Snowdon responded with data from 2016 showing a decrease in calorie consumption between 1974 and 2008 even corrected for under-reporting. In turn, Snowdon criticised van Tulleken for misunderstanding a study of calorie consumption by mine-workers. Van Tulleken claimed that mine-workers do not consume more calories, but Snowdon pointed out that the study only measured calorie consumption at work. Snowdon has criticised van Tulleken for failing to identify the mechanism by which ultra-processed foods cause obesity, and for a focus on conflicts of interest rather than rebuttals of evidence. In the "Acknowledgements" section of his book, van Tulleken thanked Snowdon for being "very generous with his time and arguments. We agree on a lot, and I am hopeful that one day he'll leave the Institute of Economic Affairs and put his considerable talents towards making the world a better place for everyone."
