= Gabriel Weston =

British physician (born 1970)

Gabriel Jessie Corfield Weston (born 15 July 1970 in London) is an English surgeon, author and television presenter. Her memoir entitled Direct Red: A Surgeon's Story was published in February 2009. It was long-listed for the Guardian First Book Award in September 2009 and won the PEN/J Ackerley Award for Autobiography in May 2010. She was one of the four presenters of the early series of the BBC Two medical series Trust Me, I'm a Doctor.

== Education and medical training ==
Weston was educated at Windlesham House School, Sussex and Bedales School, Hampshire, both co-educational independent schools, followed by the University of Edinburgh, where she gained an MA degree in English. Despite her only scientific qualification being one O level in biology, at the age of 23, Weston decided to re-train as a doctor and attended medical school in London from 1993. She qualified as a doctor in 2000 and became a member of the Royal College of Surgeons in 2003.

== Author ==
In February 2009, Weston's book Direct Red: A Surgeon's Story, a set of 14 short stories chronicling her experiences training and practising as a surgeon, was published by Jonathan Cape in the UK. Elizabeth Day wrote in The Observer: "I can't remember reading a book that absorbed me so completely, that was so riveting and yet so exact, that so cherished the beauty of language even when using it to convey the ugliest extremes of disease".

On 6 June 2013, Weston's first novel Dirty Work was published by Jonathan Cape. The novel explores the taboo subject of abortion. The Daily Telegraph wrote: "Weston brings passion to everything she does, and she is immersed in a subject that will always hold people in thrall. Everyone is obsessed with hospital dramas such as ER, House and Casualty. They provoke a thrill, the thrill of our own mortality. Weston’s books underpin that drama with integrity and a sense of nobility."

Her third book Alive – An Alternative Anatomy was published by Jonathan Cape on 6 March 2025.

== Publications ==
- Direct Red: A Surgeon's Story. London: Jonathan Cape, 2009. ISBN 978-0-224-08439-0
- Dirty Work. London: Jonathan Cape, 2013. ISBN 978-0224091282
- Alive – An Alternative Anatomy. London: Jonathan Cape, 2025. ISBN 978-1787330603

== Sources ==
- Day, Elizabeth (15 February 2009). "Incisions, incisions ..." The Guardian. London.
- Hart, Christopher (1 February 2009). "Direct Red: A Surgeon's Story by Gabriel Weston". The Times. London. Archived from the original on 16 June 2011.
- Shakespeare, Nicholas (7 February 2009). "Direct Red by Gabriel Weston – review". The Daily Telegraph. London. Archived from the original on 1 March 2009.
- Calkin, Jessamy (17 May 2013). "Gabriel Weston: the surgeon novelist tackling abortion". The Daily Telegraph. London.
