= Operation Ouch! =

British children's television show

- Created by: Chris van Tulleken; Xand van Tulleken
- Starring: Chris van Tulleken; Xand van Tulleken; Ronx İkharia; Daniel Olaiya; Raphael Olaiya; Leanne Armitage; Tosin Sotubo-Ajayi
- Country of origin: United Kingdom
- Original language: English
- No. of series: 14 + (1 special and 1 extra)
- No. of episodes: 161

Production
- Executive producers: Simone Haywood (Maverick); Kez Margrie (CBBC)
- Producers: Maverick Television; Ian France
- Running time: 28 minutes
- Production companies: Maverick Television (series 1–11); Objective Media Group Scotland (series 12–)

Original release
- Network: CBBC; BBC iPlayer (2026-)
- Release: 3 October 2012 – present

Operation Ouch! is a British comedy children's television series on the human body, showing what happens in A&E, the problems that doctors encounter and various medical experiments. The first series of Operation Ouch! aired on CBBC in October 2012 and ABC Australia in 2013. The show is hosted by twin brothers and doctors Chris and Xand van Tulleken.

Since 2016 the program has a Dutch version, called Topdoks. In June 2019 the programme's production company, Maverick Television, announced that an American version was in development.

== Overview ==
In order to educate children about medicine and biology, doctors Chris and Xand van Tulleken perform experiments on the human body to see how they work and investigate medical treatments and technology. The doctors also offer "try this at home" experiments for viewers to participate in. In addition, they follow paediatric accident and emergency personnel and patients at Alder Hey Children's Hospital and Royal Manchester Children's Hospital. The doctors also join West Midlands Ambulance Service and Midlands Air Ambulance rapid response teams on the road and in patients' homes as they assist with medical emergencies.

== Production ==
The first series has 13 episodes, the first of which aired in October 2012 on CBBC. A second series began in September 2013 and consisted of 10 episodes. A fourth and fifth series was broadcast in 2016 on the CBBC channel in the UK. The seventh and eighth series were both broadcast on CBBC in 2019, introducing Ronx İkharia who later departed at the end of the thirteenth series. A ninth series began airing on CBBC in 2020 with the first episode focusing on COVID-19. The thirteenth series in 2025 introduced twin doctors Daniel and Raphael Olaiya as additional presenters, and with the premiere of the fourteenth series in February 2026, they were joined by doctors Leanne Armitage and Tosin Sotubo-Ajayi. The primary hosts, Chris and Xand van Tulleken, were trained in medicine at the University of Oxford, and both graduated in 2002. Chris is a practicing medical doctor while Xand focuses on research and teaching.

Episodes run for 28 minutes.

=== Episodes ===
==== Series 1 (2012) ====
| Series | Episode | Name | Original air date |
|---|---|---|---|
| 1 | 1 | Operation Ouch!: Episode 1 | 3 October 2012 |
| 1 | 2 | Operation Ouch!: Episode 2 | 10 October 2012 |
| 1 | 3 | Operation Ouch!: Episode 3 | 17 October 2012 |
| 1 | 4 | Operation Ouch!: Episode 4 | 24 October 2012 |
| 1 | 5 | Operation Ouch!: Episode 5 | 31 October 2012 |
| 1 | 6 | Operation Ouch!: Episode 6 | 7 November 2012 |
| 1 | 7 | Operation Ouch!: Episode 7 | 14 November 2012 |
| 1 | 8 | Operation Ouch!: Episode 8 | 21 November 2012 |
| 1 | 9 | Operation Ouch!: Episode 9 | 28 November 2012 |
| 1 | 10 | Operation Ouch!: Episode 10 | 5 December 2012 |
| 1 | 11 | Operation Ouch!: Episode 11 | 12 December 2012 |
| 1 | 12 | Operation Ouch!: Episode 12 | 19 December 2012 |

==== Series 2 (2013) ====
| Series | Episode | Name | Original air date |
|---|---|---|---|
| 2 | 1 | Operation Ouch!: Series 2, Episode 1 | 30 September 2013 |
| 2 | 2 | Operation Ouch!: Series 2, Episode 2 | 7 October 2013 |
| 2 | 3 | Operation Ouch!: Series 2, Episode 3 | 14 October 2013 |
| 2 | 4 | Operation Ouch!: Series 2, Episode 4 | 21 October 2013 |
| 2 | 5 | Operation Ouch!: Series 2, Episode 5 | 28 October 2013 |
| 2 | 6 | Operation Ouch!: Series 2, Episode 6 | 4 November 2013 |
| 2 | 7 | Operation Ouch!: Series 2, Episode 7 | 11 November 2013 |
| 2 | 8 | Operation Ouch!: Series 2, Episode 8 | 18 November 2013 |
| 2 | 9 | Operation Ouch!: Series 2, Episode 9 | 25 November 2013 |
| 2 | 10 | Operation Ouch!: Series 2, Episode 10 | 2 December 2013 |

==== Series 3 (2015) ====
| Series | Episode | Name | Original air date |
|---|---|---|---|
| 3 | 1 | Operation Ouch!: Series 3, Episode 1 | 27 January 2015 |
| 3 | 2 | Operation Ouch!: Series 3, Episode 2 | 3 February 2015 |
| 3 | 3 | Operation Ouch!: Series 3, Episode 3 | 10 February 2015 |
| 3 | 4 | Operation Ouch!: Series 3, Episode 4 | 17 February 2015 |
| 3 | 5 | Operation Ouch!: Series 3, Episode 5 | 24 February 2015 |
| 3 | 6 | Operation Ouch!: Series 3, Episode 6 | 3 March 2015 |
| 3 | 7 | Operation Ouch!: Series 3, Episode 7 | 10 March 2015 |
| 3 | 8 | Operation Ouch!: Series 3, Episode 8 | 17 March 2015 |
| 3 | 9 | Operation Ouch!: Series 3, Episode 9 | 24 March 2015 |
| 3 | 10 | Operation Ouch!: Series 3, Episode 10 | 31 March 2015 |

==== Series 4 (2016) ====
| Series | Episode | Name | Original air date |
|---|---|---|---|
| 4 | 1 | Operation Ouch!: Series 4, Episode 1 | 18 January 2016 |
| 4 | 2 | Operation Ouch!: Series 4, Episode 2 | 25 January 2016 |
| 4 | 3 | Operation Ouch!: Series 4, Episode 3 | 1 February 2016 |
| 4 | 4 | Operation Ouch!: Series 4, Episode 4 | 8 February 2016 |
| 4 | 5 | Operation Ouch!: Series 4, Episode 5 | 15 February 2016 |
| 4 | 6 | Operation Ouch!: Series 4, Episode 6 | 22 February 2016 |
| 4 | 7 | Operation Ouch!: Series 4, Episode 7 | 29 February 2016 |
| 4 | 8 | Operation Ouch!: Series 4, Episode 8 | 7 March 2016 |
| 4 | 9 | Best Of... | 14 March 2016 |
| 4 | 10 | Don't Panic About Puberty | 21 March 2016 |

==== Series 5 – Hospital Takeover (2016) ====
| Series | Episode | Name | Original air date |
|---|---|---|---|
| 5 | 1 | Bendy Bodies | 31 October 2016 |
| 5 | 2 | Ear We Go! | 7 November 2016 |
| 5 | 3 | Bendy Cool Cartilage | 14 November 2016 |
| 5 | 4 | Awesome Oxygen | 21 November 2016 |
| 5 | 5 | Super Saliva | 28 November 2016 |
| 5 | 6 | Extraordinary Eyes | 28 November 2016 |
| 5 | 7 | Germ-Fighters | 29 November 2016 |
| 5 | 8 | Big Burps! | 30 November 2016 |
| 5 | 9 | Pancreas Power | 1 December 2016 |
| 5 | 10 | Jaw-Dropping Jaws | 2 December 2016 |

===== Operation Ouch! Hospital Takeover Live (2016) =====
In December 2016, a 2-hour live special was broadcast on the CBBC website hosted by Karim Zeroual. Guests included Cel Spellman and Millie Innes.

==== Series 6 (2017) ====
| Series | Episode | Name | Original air date |
|---|---|---|---|
| 6 | 1 | Jaw-dropping Joints | 20 September 2017 |
| 6 | 2 | Extraordinary Ears | 27 September 2017 |
| 6 | 3 | Super Sensory Neurons | 4 October 2017 |
| 6 | 4 | Colossal Coughs | 11 October 2017 |
| 6 | 5 | Terrific Teeth | 18 October 2017 |
| 6 | 6 | Exceptional Eyebrows | 25 October 2017 |
| 6 | 7 | Mind-boggling Brains | 1 November 2017 |
| 6 | 8 | Marvellous Valves | 8 November 2017 |
| 6 | 9 | Gob-smacking Growth Plates | 15 November 2017 |
| 6 | 10 | Sensational Sphinchters | 22 November 2017 |
| 6 | 11 | Super Strong Skulls | 29 November 2017 |
| 6 | 12 | Tremendous Tears | 6 December 2017 |
| 6 | 13 | Flabbergasting Favourites | 13 December 2017 |

==== Series 7 (2019) ====
| Series | Episode | Name | Original air date |
|---|---|---|---|
| 7 | 1 | What In The World Makes You, You? | 2 January 2019 |
| 7 | 2 | Why Do Bones Break? | 2 January 2019 |
| 7 | 3 | What In The World Makes You Go Yuck? | 9 January 2019 |
| 7 | 4 | Don't You Dare Pick Your Scabs! | 16 January 2019 |
| 7 | 5 | Why Is Your Poo Brown? | 23 January 2019 |
| 7 | 6 | How To Grow A Brain | 30 January 2019 |
| 7 | 7 | What In The World Thumbs Are For? | 30 January 2019 |
| 7 | 8 | How Your Reflexes Can Save You | 13 February 2019 |
| 7 | 9 | Why In The World Is Sweat Salty? | 20 February 2019 |
| 7 | 10 | Get Your Body Moving! | 27 February 2019 |
| 7 | 11 | Why Are Some People Faster Than Others In The World? | 6 March 2019 |
| 7 | 12 | Is My Body Electric? | 13 March 2019 |
| 7 | 13 | The Human Body Roadtrip! | 20 March 2019 |
| 7 | 14 | The Ouch! Awards | 27 March 2019 |

==== Series 8 (2019) ====
| Series | Episode | Name | Summary | Original air date |
|---|---|---|---|---|
| 8 | 1 | We're Having a Baby | | 11 September 2019 |
| 8 | 2 | Doctors Face Off | | 18 September 2019 |
| 8 | 3 | There's a Lizard in the Lab | | 25 September 2019 |
| 8 | 4 | Loud, LOUD, LOUDER! | | 2 October 2019 |
| 8 | 5 | What Are Vaccinations For? | | 9 October 2019 |
| 8 | 6 | Slime, Snot and Bogies | | 16 October 2019 |
| 8 | 7 | Flexible Arms and Triple Jumping | | 23 October 2019 |
| 8 | 8 | Knobbly Knees and What They Are For | | 30 October 2019 |
| 8 | 9 | Your Brilliant Brain and Sparky Signals | | 6 November 2019 |
| 8 | 10 | All Hail King Xand | | 13 November 2019 |
| 8 | 11 | It's a Tug-O-War! | | 20 November 2019 |
| 8 | 12 | Xand Goes Pop! | | 27 November 2019 |
| 8 | 13 | What Happened Next? | Meeting up with people from previous episodes to see how they are now. | 4 December 2019 |
| 8 | 14 | The Ouch! Awards 2 | | 11 December 2019 |
| 8 | 15 | Food, Poo and You! | | 18 December 2019 |

==== Do Try This at Home (2020) ====
| No. in series | Name | Summary |
|---|---|---|
| 1 | Bones | They do two "do try this at home" experiments. |
| 2 | Lungs | They look into lungs. |
| 3 | Taste | They see your taste buds. |
| 4 | Mucus | They make snot rockets. |
| 5 | Poo | They make a poo factory. |
| 6 | Bacteria | They show you bacteria. |
| 7 | Membranes | They show you what membranes are. |
| 8 | Fingerprints | Dr Xand find out who ate his "Treats 4 Xand". |
| 9 | Eyes | They show you how to find your blind spot. |
| 10 | Hearing | They show you how to make rice dance with a soundbox. |

==== Series 9 (2020–21) ====
| Series | Episode | Name | Summary | Original Air Date |
|---|---|---|---|---|
| 9 | 1 | Virus Alert! | Coronavirus Special | 5 May 2020 |
| 9 | 2 | Episode 2 | | 13 January 2021 |
| 9 | 3 | Stick Your Tongue Out! | | 20 January 2021 |
| 9 | 4 | Dr Scorpion | | 27 January 2021 |
| 9 | 5 | You're Having a Laugh! | | 3 February 2021 |
| 9 | 6 | Superhero Ribs | | 10 February 2021 |
| 9 | 7 | Doctor Alert! | | 17 February 2021 |
| 9 | 8 | Snot, Snot, Snot! | | 24 February 2021 |
| 9 | 9 | How to Train a Brain | | 3 March 2021 |
| 9 | 10 | Stinky Dr Xand! | | 10 March 2021 |
| 9 | 11 | Blink and You'll Miss It! | | 17 March 2021 |
| 9 | 12 | The Ouch Awards 3! | | 24 March 2021 |

==== Series 10 (2022) ====
| Series | Episode | Name | Summary | Original Air Date |
|---|---|---|---|---|
| 10 | 1 | Tenth Birthday | Celebrating the series' tenth birthday and catching up with people who featured in previous episodes. | 28 February 2022 |
| 10 | 2 | Poo-Tastic! | | 1 March 2022 |
| 10 | 3 | Eyeball Extravaganza! | | 2 March 2022 |
| 10 | 4 | Bum Power | | 7 March 2022 |
| 10 | 5 | Your Heartbeat | | 8 March 2022 |
| 10 | 6 | Nailed It! | | 9 March 2022 |
| 10 | 7 | Extraordinary Energy | | 14 March 2022 |
| 10 | 8 | Guts Galore! | | 15 March 2022 |
| 10 | 9 | Speedy Enzymes | | 16 March 2022 |
| 10 | 10 | Brilliant Body Temperature | | 21 March 2022 |
| 10 | 11 | Mighty Muscles! | | 22 March 2022 |
| 10 | 12 | Blood Super-Highway | | 23 March 2022 |
| 10 | 13 | Battle of the Blood Cells | | 28 March 2022 |

==== Series 11 (2022) ====
| Series | Episode | Name | Summary | Original Air Date |
|---|---|---|---|---|
| 11 | 1 | It's Hairy! | | 5 September 2022 |
| 11 | 2 | How Can You See in the Dark? | | 5 September 2022 |
| 11 | 3 | Magnificent Mucus | | 5 September 2022 |
| 11 | 4 | Mind You Don't Fall! | | 5 September 2022 |
| 11 | 5 | Tendon Take Off! | | 12 September 2022 |
| 11 | 6 | Mouth v Knee | | 13 September 2022 |
| 11 | 7 | You're Mostly Made of Water! | | 14 September 2022 |
| 11 | 8 | Explosive Energy! | | 15 September 2022 |
| 11 | 9 | Fingers on Buzzers! | | 19 September 2022 |
| 11 | 10 | It's a Lung Slide! | | 20 September 2022 |
| 11 | 11 | Earmageddon! | | 21 September 2022 |
| 11 | 12 | Heroic Hippocampus | | 22 September 2022 |
| 11 | 13 | Totally Gross! | | 23 September 2022 |

==== Series 12 (2024) ====
| Series | Episode | Name | Summary | Original Air Date |
|---|---|---|---|---|
| 12 | 1 | Explosive Spots! | | 8 January 2024 |
| 12 | 2 | Feeling Nervous! | | 8 January 2024 |
| 12 | 3 | In a Spin! | | 8 January 2024 |
| 12 | 4 | Snot-tacular! | | 8 January 2024 |
| 12 | 5 | Eyeball Action | | 15 January 2024 |
| 12 | 6 | Cracking Crystals | | 15 January 2024 |
| 12 | 7 | Don't Cry This at Home | | 15 January 2024 |
| 12 | 8 | Who's Getting Snotted? | | 15 January 2024 |
| 12 | 9 | Man v Monkey | | 22 January 2024 |
| 12 | 10 | Ask Us Anything! | | 22 January 2024 |
| 12 | 11 | What a Pong! | | 22 January 2024 |
| 12 | 12 | Rules Are Rules! | | 22 January 2024 |
| 12 | 13 | No Eating in the Lab! | | 29 January 2024 |
| 12 | 14 | We Are Superheroes! | | 29 January 2024 |

==== Series 13 (2025) ====
| Series | Episode | Name | Summary | Original Air Date |
|---|---|---|---|---|
| 13 | 1 | Fart Rocket! | | 24 February 2025 |
| 13 | 2 | Tummy Rumble-tastic! | | 24 February 2025 |
| 13 | 3 | Teardrop Explodes! | | 24 February 2025 |
| 13 | 4 | Bum Noises! | | 24 February 2025 |
| 13 | 5 | Crusty Bogies! | | 3 March 2025 |
| 13 | 6 | The Acid Test! | | 3 March 2025 |
| 13 | 7 | What a Stinker! | | 3 March 2025 |
| 13 | 8 | Snot, Snot, Snot! | | 3 March 2025 |
| 13 | 9 | Slam-Dunk Dynamite! | | 10 March 2025 |
| 13 | 10 | Rhinovirus Attack! | | 10 March 2025 |
| 13 | 11 | When You Need to Wee! | | 10 March 2025 |
| 13 | 12 | Mega Muscles! | | 10 March 2025 |
| 13 | 13 | Body-Battling Gladiator! | | 17 March 2025 |
| 13 | 14 | No Sleeping in the Lab! | | 17 March 2025 |
| 13 | 15 | Soaked to the Skin! | | 17 March 2025 |

==== Series 14 (2026) ====
| Series | Episode | Name | Summary | Original Air Date |
|---|---|---|---|---|
| 14 | 1 | Awesome Earwax! | | 23 February 2026 |
| 14 | 2 | Fart Speed! | | 23 February 2026 |
| 14 | 3 | I'm Gonna Vom! | | 23 February 2026 |
| 14 | 4 | What a Gas! | | 23 February 2026 |
| 14 | 5 | Head to Head! | | 2 March 2026 |
| 14 | 6 | Dynamite Rules! | | 2 March 2026 |
| 14 | 7 | What's Up Doc? | | 2 March 2026 |
| 14 | 8 | How to Build a Human! | | 2 March 2026 |
| 14 | 9 | What a Rollercoaster! | | 9 March 2026 |
| 14 | 10 | Pins and Needles! | | 9 March 2026 |
| 14 | 11 | Getting Lippy! | | 9 March 2026 |
| 14 | 12 | Take My Breath Away! | | 9 March 2026 |
