= Annunciation House =

Network of shelters in El Paso, Texas

Annunciation House is a network of shelters located in El Paso, Texas. It primarily provides assistance to immigrants and refugees. Their facilities provide food, sleeping accommodation, and referrals for legal and medical support. The organization has close links to local faith communities, particularly the Catholic Church. Annunciation House has received international attention and news-coverage as a result of incidents related to the 2014 American immigration crisis, the Trump administration family separation policy, the U.S.-Mexico border crisis, and the National Emergency Concerning the Southern Border of the United States. As of January 2020, Rubén Garcia has been Director of the shelter for more than 40 years.

== Activities ==
The majority of people arriving at Annunciation House come after being detained by U.S. Immigration and Customs Enforcement (ICE), or the US Border Patrol. The organization provides food, water, shelter, family reunification, and referral to legal and medical services. Annunciation House operates on both sides of the Mexico-US border.

== History ==
=== Foundation ===
Discussions concerning the founding of Annunciation House began in 1976. The founding principles included that any services and facilities provided through the shelter would be free, that those involved in the operation of the shelter would be unpaid, and the shelter would rely on donations rather than permanent funding sources. Additionally, services were to be offered to people who were not supported by existing programs. In practice, this would include the homeless poor, and undocumented people. The first location was acquired in autumn 1977, through the Diocese of El Paso loaning a vacant building. The first volunteers moved into the building on February 3, 1978. Volunteers from around the country came to El Paso to help the shelter. Loretto Academy, a Catholic girls' school, provided 40 student volunteers to the shelter in 1989. Donations to the shelter, including food and furniture, came from local businesses and charities. In 1988 alone, the Annunciation House aided more than 5,000 Central American people.

In the early 1990s, Annunciation House developed a program called the 'Border Awareness Experience' which facilitated encounters between participants, people, and groups on both side of the US-Mexican border.

By early 2003, there were four separate facilities run by Annunciation House. Each facility was supported with donations and run by a fully volunteer staff. Volunteers helped immigrants obtain basic services and shelter.

In July of 2022, Annunciation House closed one of its largest shelters which was able to accommodate around 1,500 people.

=== The Shooting of Juan Patricio Peraza ===
On February 22, 2003, a 19 year-old undocumented person from Mexico who was staying at Annunciation House, Juan Patricio Peraza, was shot and killed near to the shelter by a Border Patrol agent. At 9:00 am, Juan Patricio Peraza was disposing of trash outside of the shelter when he was stopped and questioned by two uniformed Border Patrol agents. Juan Patricio then fled when a volunteer came outside to ask what was happening. A Border Patrol agent caught Juan Patricio and hit his head with a baton. Juan Patricio continued to flee and found a steel pipe which he raised above his head. The agent who was present did not shoot but called for backup. Four other agents then arrived and surrounded Juan Patricio. A sixth agent, Vernon Billings, then arrived and after 45 seconds he fired two shots at Juan Patricio.

During the 2008 civil trial which followed the shooting, Harold Brown, a lawyer representing the Border Patrol agents, "argued that every agent at the scene that day would have been justified in shooting Peraza. That they didn't, he told the judge, doesn't make Billings' decision wrong." By comparison, a lawyer for Juan Patricio Peraza's family argued that: "The evidence is overwhelming that what happened in this case is Agent Billings turned a foot chase into a shooting." The incident drew widespread condemnation from civil and religious community leaders, and is frequently cited as an example of the militarization of the US-Mexico border region and the disproportionate use of violence by law enforcement personnel against migrant communities.

=== Recent developments ===
As a result of its front-line involvement in providing shelter and resources to migrants and homeless people in El Paso, the organization has received national attention from migrant rights groups who have encouraged donations to the organization, both financially and in the form of voluntary labor.

In early February 2024, Texas State Attorney General, Ken Paxton, demanded that Annunciation House turn over "extensive documentation about the immigrant clients" the organization serves. The Attorney General's office required the documents within one day of the request. Paxton also accused Annunciation House of "smuggling people across the southern border and operating a stash house." Ruben Garcia responded to Paxton, saying, "If the work that Annunciation House conducts is illegal – so too is the work of our local hospitals, schools, and food banks." Paxton's office also threatened to revoke the nonprofit status of Annunciation House. Leaders in El Paso, including Mayor Oscar Leeser, have denounced the lawsuit and voiced support for Annunciation House. Garcia said that he believes that the lawsuit may be the first in a line of legal actions meant to shut down shelters for migrants seeking asylum.

== In academic writing ==
Annunciation House is sometimes pointed to as an example of how migrant shelters operate in a so-called 'grey area' by both working in co-operation with law enforcement, and also providing assistance to people who are considered "illegal immigrants" by the state. Annunciation House has been used as a case study by several scholars who are interested in this dynamic.
