= Trust Me, I'm a Doctor (TV series) =

Television series

- Presented by: Michael Mosley; Gabriel Weston; Alain Gregoire; Giles Yeo; Zoe Williams
- No. of series: 9
- No. of episodes: 39

Original release
- Network: BBC Two
- Release: 10 October 2013 – 19 February 2020

Trust Me, I'm a Doctor was originally a BBC Two television programme looking at the state of health care in Britain with a combination of factual reporting and satire, presented by Phil Hammond. In 2013, a new BBC Two television series with the same name was launched, presented by a team comprising: medical journalist Michael Mosley, physicians Chris van Tulleken and Saleyha Ahsan and surgeon Gabriel Weston.

== Cast ==
Various presenters have contributed to different series. Notable presenters have included:

- Michael Mosley, medical journalist
- Guddi Singh, paediatric registrar
- Alain Gregoire, consultant psychiatrist
- Giles Yeo, obesity and endocrine geneticist
- Zoe Williams, GP and sports medicine specialist
- Saleyha Ahsan, A&E doctor
- Chris van Tulleken, infectious diseases doctor
- Gabriel Weston, surgeon

== Background ==
=== 1996–1999 ===
The original series of the show ran for four series between 1996 and 1999. A book by Hammond, also entitled Trust Me, I'm a Doctor accompanied the series. The message of both book and series was that doctors were not infallible and you should learn as much about your own healthcare as possible. The series was broadcast after Hammond assisted in exposing systemic problems in the NHS that led to poor results for child heart surgery in Britain.

=== 2013–2020 ===
The later series set out to provide viewers with the evidence behind health claims made in the media in order to allow them to make their own health decisions. The series website provided links and further information to allow viewers to read the evidence for themselves in more depth. The first episode of the 2013 series had an audience of over 3 million viewers, and gained the highest audience figures for a factual programme on the channel; the series was recommissioned repeatedly until series 9.
