= Chris van Tulleken =

British doctor and public intellectual

Jonkheer Chris van Tulleken
- Born: Christoffer van Hoogenhouck-Tulleken; 18 August 1978 (age 48); London, England
- Education: St Peter's College, Oxford; London School of Hygiene and Tropical Medicine; University College London (PhD)
- Occupations: Physician; media personality; lecturer; author

Christoffer Rodolphe van Hoogenhouck-Tulleken (born 18 August 1978), also known as Dr Chris, is a British physician, academic, writer and television presenter.

He is the identical twin brother of Alexander "Xand" van Hoogenhouck-Tulleken, who has had a similar career in global and public health. They have jointly presented several television and radio programmes, including The Doctor Who Gave Up Drugs, The Truth About... HIV, the children's series Operation Ouch! and the radio podcast A Thorough Examination. Investigating dietary causes for disease, van Tulleken authored The Sunday Times best-selling book Ultra-Processed People (2023).

== Early life and education ==
Van Tulleken was born in London to Anthony van Tulleken, an industrial designer, and his wife Kit, a publisher, on 18 August 1978. His younger brother is the film director Jonathan van Tulleken. He was educated at Hill House preparatory school, then King's College School, an independent day school for boys in Wimbledon, southwest London.

He studied medicine at St Peter's College, Oxford, in 1996. After graduating in 2002, he studied tropical medicine at the London School of Hygiene & Tropical Medicine, and went onto work in humanitarian emergencies in the Central African Republic, Pakistan and Myanmar. He studied a PhD in Molecular Virology from University College London (UCL) in 2017.

== Academic career ==
As well as being an infectious disease doctor at University College London Hospitals, van Tulleken is a professor of infection and immunity at UCL. His research focuses on how corporations affect human health, especially in the context of child nutrition, and he works with UNICEF and the World Health Organization in this area. He was the editor of the Future Healthcare Journal's June 2025 issue, discussing commercial determinants and conflicts of interest in public health and policy.

In 2024 he was the lecturer for the Royal Institution Christmas Lectures, with a lecture entitled The Truth About Food. Xand also appeared in the first lecture, while their father Anthony demonstrated a chocolate-powered engine in the second lecture. In 2016 Chris won the Max Perutz award for his HIV research.

== Television career ==
van Tulleken and his twin brother presented Channel 4's Medicine Men Go Wild, CBBC's Operation Ouch! and BBC Two's Trust Me, I'm A Doctor alongside Michael Mosley. van Tulleken was the expedition doctor for BBC Two's Operation Iceberg, and has appeared in Top Dogs: Adventures in War, Sea and Ice (BBC 2), Holiday Hit Squad (BBC One), Museum of Life (BBC Two), The Secret Life of Twins (BBC One), as well as Celebrity Mastermind and The Wright Stuff. He was also doctor to a team led by Bruce Parry which recreated the 1911 race to the South Pole in the BBC documentary Blizzard: Race to the Pole. The twins presented What's The Right Diet for You? A Horizon Special.

van Tulleken was named as an emerging British talent in "The Brit List 2013" by ShortList magazine.

In 2015 the twins presented another Horizon episode, titled Is Binge Drinking Really That Bad?, in which they tested the effects of different levels of drinking alcohol, with van Tulleken drinking moderate amounts daily, and twin brother Xand bingeing weekly.

Chris appeared with his twin on Series 5 of Hacker Time.

In 2016, alarmed by the steep rise in prescription medicine in Britain and dubious as to its efficacy, van Tulleken was featured in the BBC One television programme The Doctor Who Gave Up Drugs. In the two-part social experiment, he took over part of a GP surgery and attempted to find practical ways to treat patients and stop patients' prescription pills.

In January and February 2019 the brothers presented a documentary series called The Twinstitute, repeated in 2020.

In Surviving the Virus: My Brother & Me, after contracting COVID-19, Xand was left with an irregular heartbeat.

His television work has produced wide acclaim, and he has won two British Academy Film Awards.

== Radio and podcasts ==
van Tulleken, along with his twin brother Xand, co-hosts A Thorough Examination with Drs Chris and Xand, on BBC Radio 4. Other BBC broadcasting appearances include What's up Docs? and A Good Read.

== Writing ==
In response to his observations about processed and ultra-processed food, and expertise in nutrition, van Tulleken published the best seller Ultra-Processed People in 2023.

== Personal life ==
He has two children with his wife Dinah, who gave birth to a second daughter in June 2020. He is a 'high-profile supporter' of UNICEF.

Until February 2018, van Tulleken was a patron and board member of the medical aid and healthcare charity Doctors of the World UK, which is a member of the international Médecins du Monde network. In 2015 he ran the London Marathon for Doctors of the World, raising over £3,400.

In June 2023 he and his twin brother, Xand, were the subjects of the BBC genealogy programme Who Do You Think You Are?, in which they learned that they were descended from a wealthy slave-trader who had a plantation in Demerara in the Guianas. They are also of partial Indonesian descent via the maternal ancestors of their Javanese great-great-great-great-grandmother, Louise de Bruijn, the daughter of engineer Hendrik de Bruijn.

He is descended from Dutch Rear-Admiral Jan van Hoogenhouck Tulleken (1762–1851), originally Jan Tulleken, of a family traced back to the 15th century, who changed his name in 1822 and was raised to the nobility in 1842 with the rank of Jonkheer, the lowest tier of nobility. The family name is officially without a hyphen, and in the Netherlands, use of the name "van Tulleken" is considered wrong, as the "van" prefix belongs to the name Hoogenhouck.
