= Alina Margolis-Edelman =

Polish physicist

- Born: Alina Margolis; 18 April 1922; Łódź, Poland
- Died: 23 March 2008 (aged 85); Paris, France
- Occupation: physician
- Years active: 1945-2008
- Known for: humanitarianism

Alina Margolis-Edelman (18 April 1922 – 23 March 2008) was a Polish physician, Holocaust survivor, and resistance fighter during the Warsaw Ghetto Uprising, who was forced to flee Poland during a revival of anti-Semitism in Poland in 1968. Joining Doctors Without Borders, she later helped found Doctors of the World, participating in medical missions in Africa and the Middle East, Latin America, and Eastern Europe. Simultaneously, she worked as a physician, practicing at Necker-Enfants Malades Hospital and the Maternal-Infant Protection Service in Seine-Saint-Denis. In 1990, she returned to Poland, and began an association, "Nobody's Children", to fight against child abuse in Poland. She was the recipient of numerous awards and honors.

== Early life ==
Alina Margolis was born on 18 April 1922 in Łódź, Poland, to the Jewish physician Anna (née Markson) and her husband, Aleksander Margolis, who was also a physician. Anna was the director of the radiology department and chief of the tubercular service division of Anna Maria Hospital. Aleksander, also known by the pseudonym Paweł Gart, was an internist and head of the Municipal General Hospital of Radogoszcz, and a member of the Łódź City Council, until he was executed by the Gestapo in 1939. After his death, the family was relocated to the Warsaw Ghetto, to await transport to Treblinka. Anna managed to enroll Alina in the Jewish School of Nursing founded by Lama Blum-Bielica, and she worked in one of the hospitals in the ghetto. When transport became imminent, Anna left the ghetto with the children, all of them posing as "Aryan". Anna placed her son in a Christian orphanage, and she went into hiding.

Margolis hid with a Polish family who were anti-Semitic and who believed that she was the daughter of a Polish officer who was a prisoner of war. She worked as a courier for the Resistance and continued nursing in ghetto, becoming an integral part of the rescue efforts following the Warsaw Ghetto Uprising. The insurgency lasted three weeks, and consisted mostly of Jewish youth, led by a five-person command. One of the commanders, Marek Edelman, was the sole survivor of the leadership. When German troops burned the ghetto, Edelman attempted escape by way of the sewer system. Underground members, disguising themselves as Polish Red Cross workers, carried him out of the ghetto on a stretcher. One of the stretcher-bearers was Margolis. To ensure that no one would investigate too closely, the underground posted a sign on Edelman's body declaring him to have typhus, easily passing armed checkpoints.

Before the war ended, Margolis and Edelman returned to Łódź, and were joined, when the war ended, by her mother and brother, John. In mid-1945, Margolis and Edelman married, moved to the house which her family had occupied before the war, and she began her medical studies.

== Career ==
Completing her education, Margolis-Edelman became a pediatrician, working in the Łódź Pediatric Clinic. She specialized in diseases of the kidney and juvenile diabetes, establishing a clinic in Rąbka. She conducted research into these diseases and published her findings. In 1951, Margolis-Edelman had her son Alexander and five years later, gave birth to the couple's daughter, Anna. In the midst of preparing for her habilitation, the 1968 Polish political crisis unleashed a new wave of antisemitism and Margolis-Edelman was not allowed to defend her thesis. She and her children fled to France, but her husband remained in Łódź, providing humanitarian services to anyone in need. Unable to convince the French university to accept her Polish degree, she began her studies all over again and worked in a laboratory analyzing the blood of rats to earn a living.

After five years of study, Margolis-Edelman re-earned her ability to practice medicine and became head of the chemistry department where she worked and practicing pediatrics at the Necker-Enfants Malades Hospital. She also worked in the Maternal-Infant Protection Service in Seine-Saint-Denis, as well as serving the communes of Aubervilliers and La Courneuve. In 1978, she began working with Doctors Without Borders, on hospital ships with Vietnamese boat people, work that was later officially recognized by the Vietnamese government. When Bernard Kouchner left the organization, he and Margolis-Edelman co-founded Doctors of the World. She participated in medical missions to such places as Afghanistan, Chad, El Salvador, Guatemala, Lebanon, and Nicaragua.

During the 1981–1983 period of martial law in Poland, Margolis-Edelman supported the pro-democracy opposition. She organized internships abroad for Polish doctors, helped those who could not obtain treatment in Poland, and sent drugs and supplies to Polish hospitals, which were unable to obtain them at the time. She helped found the Franco-Polish association "SOS Aide aux Malades Polonais", to assist Poles in obtaining treatment in France. Around the same time, she served as president of the Literary Notebook Association (French: Les Cahiers Littéraires) and established the quarterly magazine Zeszyty Literackie in Paris. In 1990, she returned to Poland and established an organization called Nobody's Children to care for victims of child abuse and lobby for their protection. During the Bosnian War, she co-founded a rape victim support center and a center in Saint Petersburg to care for street children.

In 1994, Margolis-Edelman wrote a memoir about her pre-war and World War II experiences, Ala z Elementarza (later translated to English in 1998, as Ala from the Primer). The title was a reference of an earlier work by Marian Falski. As children, Margolis and her brother inspired Falski to write a widely-read early reading primer about two children, Ala and Olek. The title of Margolis-Edelman's memoir, referred to the earlier work's characters. In 1997, Margolis-Edelman published another memoir, entitled Je ne le répéterai pas, je ne veux pas le répéter (I will not repeat it, I do not want to repeat it). She was awarded the Cross of Valor for her humanitarian work and a knighthood by the Order of the Smile.

== Death and legacy ==
Margolis-Edelman died on 23 March 2008 in Paris, and was buried in the Cimetière parisien de Bagneux. A symbolic gravesite was placed as a memorial to her at the Jewish Cemetery in Warsaw. In 2010, a documentary, The Girl From A Reading Primer, directed by Edyta Wróblewska and produced by Studio Filmowe Kalejdoskop, detailing Margolis-Edelman's life was released. In 2011, an award named in her honor was established to recognize those who work to protect children.
