= Leopold Gottlieb =

Polish artist (1879–1934)

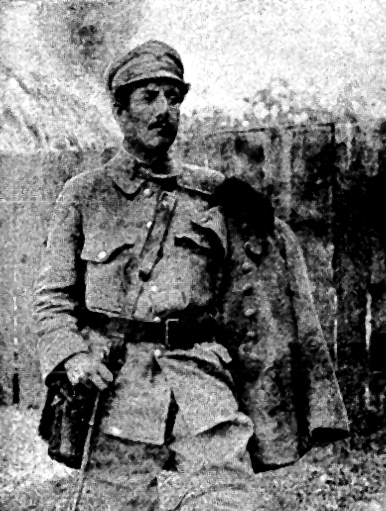
- Gottlieb during World War I
- Born: 3 June 1879; Drohobycz, Austrian Poland (now Drohobych, Ukraine)
- Died: 1934 (aged 54–55); Paris
- Movement: School of Paris

Leopold Gottlieb (1879, Drohobycz, Partitioned Poland – Paris, 1934) was a Polish-Jewish modernist painter and part of the School of Paris. His brother Maurycy Gottlieb, also a painter, died before Leopold was born.

== Career ==
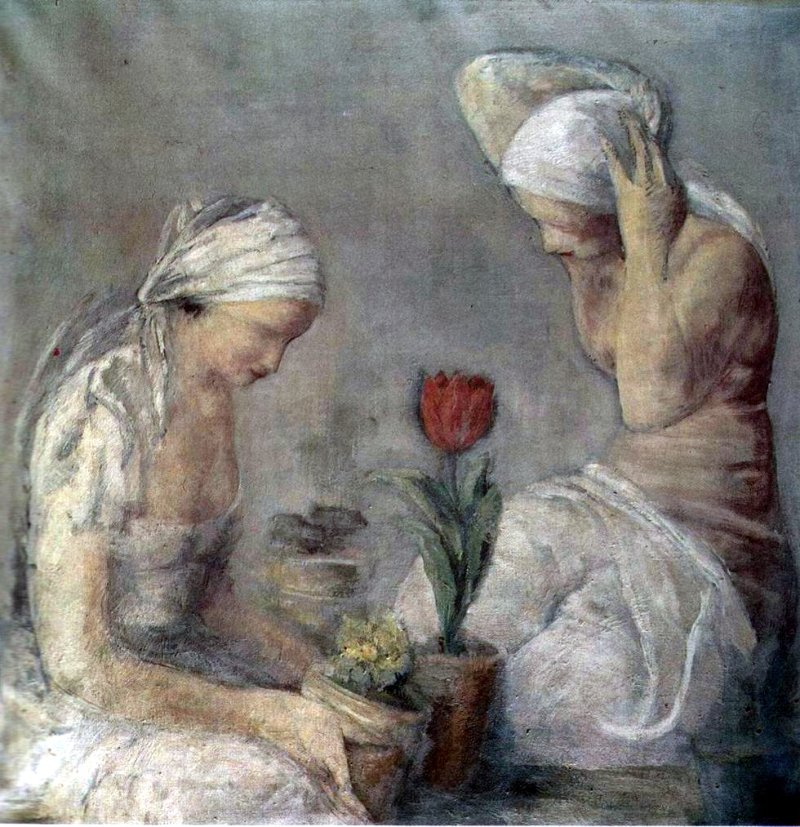
Women with a tulip

Leopold Gottlieb began his formal art education at the Academy of Fine Arts in Kraków under the direction of Jacek Malczewski. After graduating the academy, he moved to Munich to continue his studies in the studio of Anton Ažbe.

In 1904, at the age of 21 he settled in Paris and became a member of the Circle of Montparnasse artists. During the years 1904-1907, he exhibited his works in group exhibitions with four other fellow artists in Kraków, Lvov, Vienna, Berlin, and Warsaw. In 1910, he moved to Jerusalem to teach in the Bezalel School of Art. Following his return to Paris In the years 1917-1919, he took part in exhibition of Polish Expressionists (Formists) and became friends with another Polish artist, Moses Kisling, Eugene Zak and Mela Muter. His artistic talent was acknowledged by critics of that time, André Salmon and Adolf Basler, and his works were displayed in the Salon of Autumn, Independents, Société Nationale des Beaux Artes, and the Tuileries. He participated in exhibitions in the Vienna Secession. He also participated in the exhibition of Polish art, organized in 1912, at Galeries Dalmau in Barcelona.

== First World War ==
During the First World War he joined the Polish Legions. During his service in the Legions, he used to draw and document scenes depicting everyday life in the formation and the life of his fellow soldier commanders. His drawings and lithographs were presented in the "Exhibition of Polish Legions," which took place in Lublin in 1917. After the war, he settled in Poland, moved to Vienna, and then to Germany.

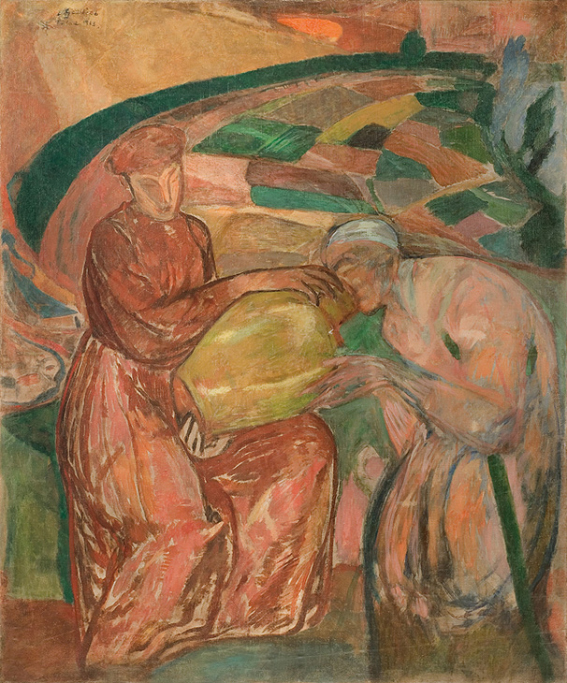
"Compassion" (Miłosierdzie), 1913

In 1926, he returned to Paris where he exhibited at the Galerie aux Quatre Chemins (1927), d'Art de Montparnasse (1928), Bonaparte (1930), and Zak (1934). In 1929 and 1930, he joined the exhibition of the Association of Polish Artists.

== Artistic style ==
Gottlieb's paintings often depict biblical themes with range of brown, green, and pink pearl tones that intensify with linear rhythm. This rhythm makes the images gain characteristics of ritual ceremony or music. The content of his painting display a rich language of icons and symbols which are drawn from Christian iconography. Gottlieb also painted many portraits of famous people, including Diego Rivera and Helena Rubinstein.
