= Friday Download (disambiguation) =

Friday Download may refer to:

- Friday Download, popular series on produced by Saltbeef Productions on CBBC
  - List of Friday Download presenters
  - List of Friday Download episodes
- Friday Download: The Movie, released theatrically as Up All Night, 2015 British comedy film directed by John Henderson based on Friday Download
