= List of Friday Download episodes =

This article lists the episodes from the television series Friday Download.

== Series overview ==
Series	Episodes	Originally released	
Series	Episodes	First released	Last released
1	13	6 May 2011	29 July 2011
Christmas Download		16 December 2011	
2	12	6 January 2012	30 March 2012
3	13	27 April 2012	20 July 2012
4	7 (Note: Including specials/previews)	23 November 2012	4 January 2013
5	10	26 April 2013	28 June 2013
6	14	20 September 2013	20 December 2013
7	8	16 May 2014	11 July 2014
8	11	4 October 2014	13 December 2014
9	15	25 April 2015	31 July 2015

== Episodes ==
=== Series 1 (2011) ===
No.	Title/Guest(s)	Original release date
1	Chipmunk (Pilot)	6 May 2011
Chipmunk is in the studio performing his single, "In The Air".
2	Yasmin	13 May 2011
Yasmin performs her single, "Finish Line".
3	Alexis Jordan	20 May 2011
Alexis Jordan performs her single, "Hush Hush".
4	Wonderland	27 May 2011
Wonderland perform their single, "Starlight".
5	Katy B	3 June 2011
Katy B performs her single, "Easy Please Me".
6	SoundGirl	10 June 2011
SoundGirl perform their single, "Don't Know Why". Note: Georgia is absent for this episode.
7	Tinchy Stryder and Dappy	17 June 2011
Tinchy Stryder and Dappy perform their single, "Spaceship".
8	The Saturdays	24 June 2011
The Saturdays perform their single, "Notorious".
9	Rizzle Kicks	1 July 2011
Rizzle Kicks are in the studio to perform their single, "Down With the Trumpets", as well as to take part in a rapping challenge in Weekend Download.
10	Nicola Roberts	8 July 2011
Girls Aloud singer Nicola Roberts performs her début solo single, "Beat of My Drum".
11	The Wanted	15 July 2011
The Wanted are special guests and perform their single, "Glad You Came", whilst Aidan teaches us the dance move that got him through to Britain's Got Talent in 2009 in Dance Download. Note: Georgia is absent in the studio for this and the remaining episodes in the first series due to filming commitments for the second series of Sadie J.
12	Encore	22 July 2011
Encore are in the studio to perform their single, "Tit for Tat".
13	"Summer Download"	29 July 2011
Jason Derulo joins Aidan in Dance Download, as well as take part in Hot Or Not. He also takes a look at the viewers' tribute to his hit single "Ridin' Solo" in Music Tribute Download. Wretch 32 and Josh Kumra are also in the studio to perform their single, "Don't Go".

=== Christmas Download (2011) ===
No.	Title	Original release date
14	"Christmas Download"	16 December 2011
The Wanted are in the studio to join in with the festive fun, and many celebrities have a pre-recorded Christmas message for you.

=== Series 2 (2012) ===
No. overall	No. in series	Title/Guest(s)	Original release date
15	1	Rizzle Kicks; The Wanted	6 January 2012
Aidan Davis demonstrates Rizzle Kicks' latest dance move in Dance Download and Rizzle Kicks sing their single "Mama Do the Hump". The Wanted sing "Warzone".
16	2	Nicola Roberts	13 January 2012
Nicola Roberts joins the team in the studio and performs her new single "Yo-Yo".
17	3	Cover Drive and Rizzle Kicks	20 January 2012
Aidan dances to One Direction's hit single, "What Makes You Beautiful". Rizzle Kicks delivers a superstar rapping masterclass. Cover Drive are also in the studio to perform their single "Twilight".
18	4	Pixie Lott	27 January 2012
Pixie Lott is in the studio to sing her hit single "Kiss the Stars", and to watch the viewers' tribute of her début single, "Mama Do", in Music Tribute Download. There's a sing along to One Direction's "What Makes you Beautiful".
19	5	Roll Deep, One Direction, Jedward and Tinchy Stryder	3 February 2012
Jedward make an appearance in TV Download. Aidan and Ceallach pay One Direction a visit. Roll Deep perform "Picture Perfect".
20	6	Encore, Encore, Big Time Rush, JLS, One Direction, Saffron Coomber, Kermit the Frog and Miss Piggy	10 February 2012
Encore perform "Fun Last Night" and Big Time Rush perform "Music Sounds Better With U. JLS watch the viewers' versions of their hit single, "Beat Again", in Music Tribute Download. Note: Dionne is absent in the studio due to tour commitments, but she still featured in Music Download, which was filmed off set, and guest presented the Style Download segment.
21	7	Cher Lloyd	17 February 2012
Cher Lloyd performs her brilliant new single "Want U Back". Tyger shows you how to create your own animations in Games Download and Richard gives unicycling a go in Weekend Download. Note: Dionne is once again absent from the studio, but she still appears in Music Download, which was filmed off set. She also appears in a special download which was filmed at her 16th birthday party.
22	8	Maverick Sabre and Cover Drive	24 February 2012
Cover Drive's Amanda learns Aidan's latest move in Dance Download then joins band-mate T-Ray in Hot or Not. Rich and Cel have a Jedward Music Tribute Download. Maverick Sabre is in the studio to perform his latest track. Note: Dionne is once again absent in the studio due to other commitments. But she still appears in the Music Download, which was filmed off set.
23	9	Tinchy Stryder, Pixie Lott, JLS, Dani Harmer	2 March 2012
Dani Harmer joins Tyger in the studio for a Dance Download master-class from Aidan, ahead of their appearance on Let's Dance for Sport Relief. It's a performance from Tinchy Stryder and Pixie Lott of their new single, "Bright Lights".
24	10	Mindless Behavior, Cover Drive and Saffron Coomber	9 March 2012
Cover Drive give an exclusive backstage performance of their number 1 hit, "Twilight". Mindless Behavior stop by for a Dance Download with Aidan and perform their single "Mrs. Right" in Dionne's Music Download.
25	11	Labrinth, Chiddy Bang, Dani Harmer and Saffron Coomber	16 March 2012
Ceallach chats to Dani Harmer in TV Download. Labrinth performs his new single, "Last Time", and Chiddy Bang pop by to join Dionne for Music Download.
26	12	Olly Murs, Victoria Justice, Conor Maynard and Rizzle Kicks	30 March 2012
Olly Murs joins the Friday Download gang for a fun packed final episode of the series. Richard and Cel catch up with Rizzle Kicks in Weekend Download, and go head-to-head in a rap battle.

=== Series 3 (2012) ===
No. overall	No. in series	Title/Guest(s)	Original release date
27	1	Carly Rae Jepsen, George Sampson, and the cast of Marvel's Avengers Assemble	27 April 2012
New pop sensation Carly Rae Jepsen joins the team and performs her number 1 single, "Call Me Maybe".
28	2	Rita Ora, Far East Movement and Mindless Behavior	4 May 2012
Dionne is joined by Far East Movement in Music Download, and Rita Ora performs her new single, "R.I.P."
29	3	Tulisa	11 May 2012
Tulisa is in the studio to join in the fun and perform her latest track, "Young".
30	4	Professor Green	18 May 2012
Tyger has a new card trick to master in Just for Laughs. It's a Conor Maynard Music Tribute, and some surprise guests pop in to check out the latest tracks with Dionne in Music Download. Professor Green is taking to the stage for a special Friday Download performance of his latest track.
31	5	Alexandra Burke, Bella Thorne and Zendaya	25 May 2012
Alexandra Burke takes to the stage to perform her new track, "Let it Go". Viewers' Music Tribute versions of Labrinth's video for Last Time. Bella Thorne and Zendaya also make an appearance in TV Download, talking about Shake It Up.
32	6	Lawson, Steve Backshall, Kristen Stewart, and the cast of Snow White & the Huntsman	1 June 2012
Deadly 60 star Steve Backshall joins Hot or Not. New band Lawson perform their brilliant track, "When She Was Mine". It's Olly Murs' "Oh My Goodness" in the Sing Download.
33	7	Marcus Collins	8 June 2012
Tracy Beaker Returns star Daniel Pearson heads out on a Weekend Download to take driving lessons from UK karting champion Ronan McKenzie. Plus, Marcus Collins performs his new single, "Mercy".
34	8	Cover Drive, Stooshe, Justin Bieber and The Muppets	15 June 2012
Dionne heads out to meet the one and only Justin Bieber in Music Download, the Muppets make an appearance in Movie Download and Cover Drive perform their recent hit track, "Sparks".
35	9	Josh Osho, Diversity's Jordan Banjo and Perri Luc Kiely	22 June 2012
Josh Osho joins the gang to perform his hit single "Redemption Days". Aidan is joined by Diversity's Jordan and Perri in Dance Download, and Daniel Pearson heads out on a kite-themed Weekend Download. Georgia also has some picnic tips for you in Style Download, and we have your 'Hot Right Now' music tributes.
36	10	Adam Lambert and Misha B	29 June 2012
Misha B joins the gang in the studio, trying Aidan's latest routine in Dance Download, answering your questions in Star Download, and talking music with Dionne in Music Download. Adam Lambert performs his latest track, "Never Close our Eyes". It's a "Call Me Maybe" Music Tribute, and the show ends with Cheryl's "Call My Name" for Sing Download.
37	11	Conor Maynard, Katy Perry, Diversity's Jordan Banjo and Perri Luc Kiely	6 July 2012
Conor Maynard joins the gang this week to perform his brand new single "Vegas Girl". Also, Ceallach meets the one and only Katy Perry in Movie Download to chat about her new film Part of Me. Note: Georgia is absent for this episode, Talia Francis stands in for her.
38	12	Little Mix	13 July 2012
Little Mix try out Aidan's latest routine in Dance Download, answer your questions in Star Download, and perform their latest single "Wings" in Music Download. Note: Georgia Lock is once again absent for this episode Talia Francis stands in for her.
39	13	"Summer Download"	20 July 2012
The team head outdoors and take a look back at the best bits from the past twelve shows. They are joined by the Style and Weekend Download guest presenters Kieran, Danny, Shannon and Talia.

=== Series 4 (2012) ===
No. overall	No. in series	Title/Guest(s)	Original release date
40	1	Lawson	23 November 2012
Cel checks out the final Twilight film, and we show the audience's homemade versions of Taylor Swift's "We Are Never Ever Getting Back Together". Also, Lawson perform their hit single, "Standing In The Dark". Wolfblood's Aimee Kelly and Bobby Lockwood were also in the studio. Note: Tyger is absent for this episode due to filming Outnumbered, Daniel Pearson stands in for him.
41	2	One Direction	30 November 2012
Aidan has his latest moves in Dance Download, Cel fills you in on what to watch in TV and Movie Download and in a very special Music Download, Dionne meets One Direction. Note: Tyger is absent for this episode, Daniel Pearson stands in for him.
42	3	Diversity's Ashley Banjo, Perri Luc Kiely, Jordan Banjo and One Direction	7 December 2012
Richard picks up ping pong tips in Weekend Download and Georgia solves a fashion dilemma in Style Download. Diversity boys Ashley, Perri and Jordan join the team in the studio and One Direction take on the Star Download challenge. Note: Georgia is absent for this episode for her school play, Shannon Flynn stands in for her.
43	4	JLS	14 December 2012
Aidan has a new move for us in Dance Download, Georgia gets ready for Christmas with some new games in Style Download, and Dionne delivers her pick of the latest tracks in Music Download, with a performance live in the studio from JLS of their new single, "Give Me Life". Note: Georgia is absent for this episode for her school play, Talia Francis stands in for her.
44	5	"Christmas Download"	21 December 2012
A Christmas themed edition of Friday Download, featuring Olly Murs performing his hit single "Troublemaker", and the leading stars of new CBBC drama series Wizards vs Aliens. Dionne gets the audience in the festive mood by singing two classic Christmas songs. Ceallach meets the stars of The Hobbit in Movie Download, Georgia gets ready for Christmas with some new games in Style Download, and Tyger takes a look at the must have games and gadgets in Games Download.
45	6	"2012 Download"	31 December 2012
The Friday Download team look back at some of their highlights on the show during 2012.
46	7	"2013 Preview"	4 January 2013
Khalil Madovi appears and Taio Cruz joins the team and performs his latest single, "Fast Car". Note: This is the final episode featuring Tyger Drew-Honey and Georgia Lock as presenters.

=== Series 5 (2013) ===
The fifth series saw the departure of Tyger Drew-Honey and Georgia Lock, with former guest presenters Shannon Flynn and Daniel Pearson replacing them.

No. overall	No. in series	Title/Guests	Original release date
47	1	A*M*E, Ruff Diamond and Loveable Rogues	26 April 2013
A*M*E and Duke Dumont's perform "Need U (100%)", Ruff Diamond was with Aidan in Dance Downloads and Loveable Rogues and Dionne do Sing Download to Olly Murs' Troublemaker.
48	2	Wretch 32 and Akai Osei	3 May 2013
Akai Osei talks about his film, All Stars and also joins Aidan on the stage for Dance Download to Disclosure's White Noise. Danny's been brushboarding in Weekend Download and Wretch 32 is in the studio to perform "Blackout" with Shakka.
49	3	Little Mix	10 May 2013
Little Mix perform "How Ya Doin'". Cel meets the cast of Star Trek Into Darkness in Movie Download. In Dance Download, Aidan tackles Michael Jackson's Speed Demon.
50	4	Tich, Jameela Jamil and Jennifer Pinches	17 May 2013
Radio 1's Jameela Jamil joins Dionne for Music Download and Hot or Not. Tich performs her debut single "Dumb". Aidan teaches us a move from will.i.am and Justin Bieber's #thatPower.
51	5	Nina Nesbitt, Antix and Selena Gomez	24 May 2013
Dionne meets Selena Gomez. Antix joins Aidan for Skrillex's "Breaking A Sweat" in Dance Download. Nina Nesbitt performs her latest single "Stay Out".
52	6	Stooshe and Will Smith	31 May 2013
Stooshe perform "Slip". Cel meets Will Smith in Movie Download. Aidan teaches a routine to Justin Timberlake's "Suit & Tie". In Tribute Download, the viewers cover The Saturdays' "What About Us". Cel teaches us how to make a bow-tie in Style Download. In Sing Download, there's a special performance of DJ Fresh's "The Feeling".
53	7	Union J, Olly Murs and Gabz	7 June 2013
Union J perform their debut single "Carry You". Dionne meets Olly Murs. Britain's Got Talent finalist Gabz joins Shannon and Aidan in TV Download.
54	8	Charlie Brown, Fuse ODG and Olly Murs	14 June 2013
Charlie Brown performs his hit single "On My Way". Fuse ODG performs "Antenna". Aidan teaches a new move to Disclosure's "You & Me". Olly Murs takes part in Shout Out Download. Cel meets the cast of Man Of Steel in Movie Download.
55	9	A*M*E, IMD Legion and George Sear	21 June 2013
Got To Dance finalists IMD open the show. Aidan is joined by Richard and George in Dance Download to teach a new move to Fuse ODG's "Antenna". A*M*E performs "Heartless" in Music Download.
56	10	"Summer Download"	28 June 2013
Jason Derulo performs "The Other Side". Aidan teaches a move to Bruno Mars' "Treasure" while Dionne performs "Treat Me Right" and Cel meets Miranda Cosgrove to talk about Despicable Me 2.

=== Series 6 (2013) ===
This is the first series to feature George Sear as a full-time presenter, replacing former presenter Danny Pearson.

No. overall	No. in series	Title/Guests	Original release date
57	1	The Vamps, Jessie J & Bobby Lockwood	20 September 2013
Aidan meets Jessie J to talk party planning and discuss her upcoming music. in Dance Download, Aidan is joined by Cellach and Wolfblood's Bobby Lockwood for a move to Jessie J's "Excuse My Rude". The Vamps perform their debut single "Can We Dance".
58	2	Conor Maynard, Jessie J & Lawson	27 September 2013
Dionne and Conor Maynard take to the stage to perform his hit single "Can't Say No". Richard and Shannon join Aidan in Dance Download to learn a move to Ray Foxx's "Boom Boom". Lawson perform their single "Juliet".
59	3	Eliza Doolittle, Daniel Howell & Phil Lester	4 October 2013
George shows us how to get hair like Zayn Malik from One Direction in Style Download. Aidan & Richard are joined by Dan & Phil in Dance Download to learn a routine to DJ Fresh vs Diplo's "Earthquake". Conor Maynard, The Vamps, Dionne, Bobby Lockwood, Lawson, Dan & Phil and Eliza Doolittle take part in ChatCam Download. Eliza Doolittle performs her brand new single "Let It Rain".
60	4	Rory O'Shea & Conor Maynard	11 October 2013
Rory O'Shea from Got To Dance joins Aidan and George in Dance Download to teach a popping routine to "Scream- Rollercoaster". Conor Maynard joins Dionne in Backstage Download to talk about fans. Some of the special guests take part in Chat Cam Download. Conor Maynard performs "R U Crazy".
61	5	The Cast of Ender's Game, Luminites, Ariana Grande & Jennette McCurdy	18 October 2013
Cel meets the cast of Ender's Game. George shows the viewers how to decorate their mobile phone case in Style Download. Aidan is joined by Cel and Shannon to teach an isolation routine to Stylo G- Badd in Dance Download. Luminites perform "Do Something" in Music Download.
62	6	The Cast Of Thor: The Dark World and Union J	25 October 2013
The team are joined by Union J. Aidan is joined by Richard and Cel for Dance Download to Michael Jackson's "Thriller". Cel meets the cast of Thor: The Dark World in Movie Download. Union J perform their single "Beautiful Life".
63	7	Diversity, Nick Grimshaw and James Arthur	1 November 2013
Nick Grimshaw joins the team for a special Teen Awards Download. Aidan is joined by Diversity in Dance Download. James Arthur performs his new single "You're Nobody 'til Somebody Loves You". Perri and Jordan from Diversity join the team for Hot or Not. Shannon shows off her scarf tying tips in Style Download. Note: Ashley Banjo was not able to join Diversity in the studio due to other commitments
64	8	Little Mix	8 November 2013
In a special 'Teen Award' Download, the presenters take us behind the scenes at Wembley Arena and talk to Conor Maynard, Tinie Tempah, Icona Pop, James Arthur, Little Mix, Rizzle Kicks, Greg James, The Vamps, Ruff Diamonds, Gemma Cairney and show some exclusive clips. Little Mix perform their new single "Move".
65	9	Pudsey Bear and Rizzle Kicks	15 November 2013
Special guest Pudsey Bear performs a special dance routine. Cel and George visit one of the projects that Children In Need supports and perform the Magic Sleeve trick in a Children In Need On The Road Special. Pudsey joins Aidan, Cel and Dionne in Dance Download. Rizzle Kicks perform "Skip to the Good Bit".
66	10	Antics, The Cast of The Hunger Games: Catching Fire, Sway, KSI and Tigger Da Author	22 November 2013
Cel meets the cast of The Hunger Games: Catching Fire in Movie Download. Aidan is joined by Antics in Dance Download. In Weekend Download and Richard visits Luminites at a recording studio in South London for a beatboxing masterclass. Sway performs his new single "No Sleep" with KSI and Tigger Da Author.
67	11	McFly and Elyar Fox	29 November 2013
Eylar Fox opens the show with the first ever live television performance of his debut single "Do It All Over Again". Aidan is joined by Dionne and Shannon in Dance Download. George joins McFly for Shoutout Download. McFly perform their new single "Love Is on the Radio".
68	12	The Vamps and Jack Carroll	6 December 2013
The Vamps have an exclusive backstage look at their new video for "Wild Heart". Aidan is joined by Cel and George in Dance Download.
69	13	Union J, Neon Jungle and Harry Hill	13 December 2013
Harry Hill introduces the presenters and Union J perform 'Loving You Is Easy'. Neon Jungle join Aidan for Dance Download to teach a routine to their new single "Braveheart".
70	14	Christmas Download (With Little Mix and Bobby Lockwood)	20 December 2013
The Secret Santa is revealed as Bobby Lockwood. Aidan is joined by George, Dionne, Shannon, Richard and Cel to learn a routine to "Rocking Robin". Tinie Tempah and Labrinth send out a Christmas Message. Shannon has some Christmas Jumper tips in Christmas Style Download. Little Mix perform "Little Me" in Music Download.

=== Series 7 (2014) ===
This is the first series to be produced at The London Studios. Davis has departed from the show, heralding the end of Dance Download. Richard Wisker remains on the presenting team. Guest presenters this series include The Vamps, Harvey, Anais Gallagher, Tinchy Stryder and Austin Mahone.

No. overall	No. in series	Title/Guests	Original release date
71	1	The Vamps, Aaron Taylor-Johnson, Harvey and Anais Gallagher	16 May 2014
The Vamps open the show and later perform two other numbers. The viewers pay tribute to Little Mix's "Word Up" in Tribute Download. George is in the kitchen teaching us how to make Gingerbread Men in brand new Bake Up Download.
72	2	Harvey, Anais Gallagher, Nick Grimshaw, Elle Fanning and Foxes	23 May 2014
Shannon is joined by Dionne for TV, Movie and Radio Download where they talk about the Radio 1 Big Weekend, including a chat with Nick Grimshaw. Foxes performs her new single "Holding onto Heaven". The viewers pay tribute to Rita Ora's new single "I Will Never Let You Down" in Tribute Download.
73	3	Anais Gallagher, Sheppherd, Bars & Melody, the cast of The Next Step, Katy B, John Newman, Rita Ora, Example, Tinie Tempah, The Vamps, Ed Sheeran, Clean Bandit, Trevor Tordjman, Brittany Raymond, Lamar Johnson and Ella Henderson	6 June 2014
One Direction answer viewer questions in Big Weekend Download. The viewers pay tribute to The Vamps' hit single "Wild Night" in Tribute Download. Shannon chats to Britain's Got Talent finalists Bars & Melody in a special TV Download. Shannon meets James, Riley and West of hit CBBC show The Next Step in a special Next Step Download. Ella Henderson performs her debut single "Ghost".
74	4	Tinchy Stryder, Bacu, Kinetika Bloco, Chris Draper, Harvey, Little Mix, Ella Henderson and Bars & Melody	13 June 2014
A World Cup special edition. Samba drummers Kinetika Bloco and football freestyler Chris Draper open the show with the official World Cup 2014 song. Tinchy Stryder performs. The viewers pay tribute to Anna Kendrick's "Cups (When I'm Gone)" in Tribute Download.
75	5	Harvey, Ella Eyre, Demi Lovato, 5 Seconds Of Summer, Anais Gallagher, Ansel Elgort, Bars & Melody and Ella Henderson	20 June 2014
Ella Eyre opens the show with her new single "If I Go". Dionne chats to Demi Lovato in a special Demi Download. 5 Seconds Of Summer perform "Don't Stop". Harvey, Richard and the viewers pay tribute to Michael Jackson and Justin Timberlake's hit single "Love Never Felt So Good" in Tribute Download.
76	6	Anais Gallagher, Neon Jungle, Demi Lovato, Julie Rogers, Leona Lewis, Hannah Arterton, Ella Eyre, 5 Seconds Of Summer & The Vamps	27 June 2014
Neon Jungle open the show with "Louder". The Vamps perform "Somebody to You". Viewers pay tribute to One Direction's hit single "You and I" in Tribute Download.
77	7	Austin Mahone, The Vamps, Foxes, 5 Seconds Of Summer, Anais Gallagher, Julie Rogers & Alexa Goddard	4 July 2014
Guest presenter Austin Mahone opens the show with an exclusive performance of Mmm Yeah and later joins the team for Upload Download. The Vamps show a behind-the-scene video on the set of "Somebody to You" in The Vamps Download. Viewers pay tribute to Little Mix's latest single "Salute" in Tribute Download.
78	8	"Summer Download" (With Anais Gallagher, Harvey, Bars and Melody, Louisa Connolly-Burnham, Gabrielle Green, Shorelle Hepkin, Rachel Teate, Leona Kate Vaughan and Bobby Lockwood, Nicole Scherzinger, The Vamps, 5 Seconds Of Summer, Austin Mahone, Cate Blanchett & Pixie Lott)	11 July 2014
Anais and Harvey guest present and feature in Upload Download. The team open with a dance routine to Jessie J's "It's My Party". The Vamps send a summer message. The cast of Wolfblood take us behind the scenes of series 3 in Wolfblood Download. Bars & Melody take part in Star Download and later perform their debut single "Hopeful". Viewers to pay tribute to Pharrell's "Happy" in Tribute Download.

=== Series 8 (2014) ===
Due to Dionne's departure, guest presenters will be replacing her with another as a 6th presenter. The main presenting team is Shannon Flynn, George Sear, Ceallach Spellman and Richard Wisker. Dionne departing replaces her with guest presenters who will present music download and sing download. Dionne will make an appearance in the series including the Radio 1 Teen Awards. Guest presenters this season include Molly Rainford, Anaïs Gallagher, Akai Osei, Harvey Cantwell, Jordan Brown, Julie Rogers, Kedar Williams-Sterling and Bars & Melody. Akai Osei joining the team includes the reappearance of Dance Download. Richard Wisker also misses a few episodes for unknown reasons. The final episode of the series is a Christmas download special. Despite retaining the 'Friday Download' title, this series premiered new episodes in a Saturday morning slot.

No. overall	No. in series	Title/Guests	Original release date
79	1	Molly Rainford, Anais Gallagher, Akai Osei, Julie Rogers & Pixie Lott	4 October 2014
The team welcome Akai and Molly to the team in Upload Download. Shannon has a sneak peek at One Direction's new film Where We Are - The Concert Film in Movie Download. George and Shannon have a screaming contest and his castmate reveal some secrets about him. Pixie Lott performs "Break Up Song". Viewers pay tribute to 5 Seconds Of Summer's hit track "Don't Stop" in Tribute Download.
80	2	Anais Gallagher, Akai Osei, Bars & Melody, Alexa Goddard & Ella Henderson	11 October 2014
Akai and Bars & Melody join the team as guest presenters. Alexa Goddard opens the show with a performance of her new single "So There". Ella Henderson performs "Glow". Akai and Shannon join Cel for Games Download. The viewers cover Union J's "Tonight (We Live Forever)" in Tribute Download.
81	3	Molly Rainford, Anais Gallagher, Kedar Williams-Sterling, Jordan Brown, Nick Grimshaw & The Vamps	18 October 2014
Nick Grimshaw joins the team ahead of Radio 1's Teen Awards. The presenters help with homework worries in What's Up Download, Cel and Molly check out the latest music picks with Nick in Music Download, Anais is back on the road with another top tip in Style Download and The Vamps are here to perform.
82	4	Dionne Bromfield, Ariana Grande, Ella Henderson, The Vamps, Rixton, Labrinth & Little Mix	25 October 2014
Join Dionne Bromfield, Ceallach Spellman, Richard Wisker, Shannon Flynn and George Sear for a special Friday Download filmed backstage at Radio 1's Teen Awards. They hang out with Ariana Grande, Ella Henderson, The Vamps, Rixton, Labrinth, Little Mix and more and award the winner of their own FD Best British Breakthrough Award live on the Wembley stage.
83	5	Molly Rainford, Anais Gallagher & Ariana Grande	1 November 2014
Ariana Grande joins Richard Wisker, Ceallach Spellman, Shannon Flynn, George Sear, Molly Rainford and Anais Gallagher for the instant download for the week ahead. She performs her hit tracks "Problem" and "Break Free" and joins Hot or Not, as well as taking on the Star Download challenge. The presenters have an unusual way to get dressed in the morning in Upload Download, there are viewers' versions of Taylor Swift's "Shake it Off" video in Tribute Download and Molly Rainford ends the show singing Ella Henderson's "Ghost".
84	6	Molly Rainford, Anais Gallagher, Harvey Cantwell & Rixton	8 November 2014
Rixton are in the studio to join Shannon Flynn, George Sear, Ceallach Spellman, Harvey Cantwell, Anais Gallagher and Molly Rainford. The band join Upload Download, Hot or Not and take on Star Download, while Jake joins Face Off and Anais faces the forfeit. Danny joins Games Download. Pudsey Bear stops by ahead of Children in Need, and Harvey ends the show singing One Direction. Note:Richard Wisker is absent from this episode due to unknown reasons therefore guest presenter Harvey Cantwell replaces him.
85	7	Molly Rainford, Akai Osei, Dionne Bromfield, Bars & Melody, Becky Hill & One Direction	15 November 2014
Cel, George, Shannon, Molly, Akai and Bars and Melody present an anti-bullying special episode. Molly performs Little Mix's "Wings" and the team deliver a two-part What's Up Download with advice for both those being bullied and anyone that might worry that they are acting like a bully. Becky Hill performs "Losing" in Music Download, Bars and Melody take on Star Download, Dionne meets One Direction and Cel meets the cast of The Hunger Games. Note:Richard Wisker is absent again for this episode due to unknown reasons therefore guest presenter Akai Osei replaces him.
86	8	Molly Rainford, Anais Gallagher, Harvey Cantwell, Akai Osei, Fuse ODG, One Direction & Professor Green	22 November 2014
George, Shannon, Cel, Rich, Molly and Akai bring the instant download for the week ahead. Professor Green opens the show, and Fuse ODG leads Dance Download ahead of a performance of "T.I.N.A". Also, there is a Tribute Download special, together with BBC Music, with the audience's own versions of the "God Only Knows" video. One Direction take on Star Download and Molly performs their hit "Live While We're Young" to end the show.
87	9	Molly Rainford, Anais Gallagher, Bars & Melody & Rixton	29 November 2014
Rich, Cel, Shannon, George, Molly, Anais and Bars & Melody bring the instant download for the week ahead. Richard Wisker opens the show with a performance of his own track "Skinny Jeans". Cel meets the cast of Paddington in Movie Download, George makes pizzas in Bake It Download, Rixton are back to perform in Music Download and Bars and Melody get the studio audience rapping in Backstage Download.
88	10	Molly Rainford, Akai Osei & Union J	6 December 2014
Ceallach, Richard, George, Shannon, Molly and Akai bring the instant download for the week ahead. Union J are in the studio to perform "You Got It All" and "It's Beginning to Look a Lot Like Christmas". They take on Star Download, and join the team for Upload Download and Hot or Not. Also, there is an exclusive look behind the scenes on the set of The Friday Download Movie.
89	11	"Christmas Download"	13 December 2014
Cel, George, Shannon, Richard, Molly, Akai, Harvey and Anais bring the instant download for Christmas. The Vamps perform "Jingle Bells", Bars and Melody have their own unique version of "Deck the Halls", Echosmith are in the studio to perform their debut single "Cool Kids" and Molly ends the show singing "All I Want for Christmas is You". The Festive Face off reappears. Anais has a festive Style Download adding sparkle to an old jumper and George makes biscuits for the tree in Bake It Download.

=== Series 9 (2015) ===
The presenting team includes former stand-in presenters: Molly Rainford, Anaïs Gallagher, Harvey Cantwell, Akai Osei, Leondre Devries and Charlie Lenehan. New things for this series include listicles and all the presenters singing at the end of each show plus the will also go round to each other's house's to do cool things.

No. overall	No. in series	Title/Guest(s)	Original release date
90	1	Conor Maynard	24 April 2015
Friday Download is back and it's all changed. Anais Gallagher, Bars and Melody (Leondre Devries and Charlie Lenehan), Molly Rainford, Akai Osei-Mansfield and Harvey Cantwell share all their favourite trends, crazes and games for the show where anything can, and will happen. Conor Maynard joins the gang and performs his latest single "Talking About". Molly sings us out with "Uptown Funk".
91	2	M.O	1 May 2015
Anais Gallagher, Bars and Melody, Molly Rainford, Akai Osei-Mansfield and Harvey Cantwell hang out as they chat about chores and try out the 'gianting' photo craze. Molly and Harvey sing Olly Murs and Demi Lovato's hit, "Up", and new girl band M.O join the gang and perform "Preach".
92	3	Shift K3Y	8 May 2015
Anais Gallagher, Bars and Melody (Leondre Devries and Charlie Lenehan), Molly Rainford, Akai Osei-Mansfield and Harvey Cantwell chat about the weekend. Akai teaches the audience at home a dance move for Shift K3Y's performance of "Name and Number" on the show, Harvey practises his piano scales and Bars and Melody perform "Billionaire".
93	4	Daniel Huttlestone and MiC LOWRY	15 May 2015
Akai, Harvey, Anais, Molly, Charlie and Leondre are joined by Into the Woods star Daniel Huttlestone to hang out. Akai heads into the recording studio before taking Leondre on in a rap battle, the team put together their listicle on break times and perfect their red carpet style for the premiere of the new Friday Download movie. Upcoming boyband MiC LOWRY perform their single "Tuxedo" and Molly sings Meghan Trainor's "Lips are Movin" to end the show.
94	5	Ella Eyre	22 May 2015
The team are joined by Ella Eyre to hang out. Anais and Ella talk art, Akai builds his rapping confidence with a performance during assembly at school, the gang build a listicle on sleepovers, and Harvey does the washing up for the first time. Ella Eyre performs her new single, "Together", and Akai joins Molly to end the show with a cover of Iggy Azalea's "Trouble".
95	6	Rixton	29 May 2015
The team are joined by Rixton to hang out and welcome in the weekend. Molly goes round to Anais' to help tidy her room, Akai gets everyone moving to his performance of "Fester Skank", Rixton perform their latest single "We All Want the Same Thing" and Bars and Melody end the show with B.O.B's "Airplanes".
96	7	HomeTown	5 June 2015
The team celebrate BBC Music Day and are joined by Irish boyband HomeTown. Bars and Melody head to a celebrity football match, Harvey practises piano before delivering some revision tips and the gang perform "We Go Together" from Grease to end the show.
97	8	Kieran Alleyne	12 June 2015
The team are joined by Kieran Alleyne, star of CBBC's Dani's Castle turned pop star, who gives an exclusive first TV performance of his track "Be Around". Harvey takes revenge on Akai with a prank payback, the team talk weekends for the FD Listicle and Molly and Akai perform Tinie Tempah and Jess Glynne's "Not Letting Go".
98	9	Stereo Kicks	19 June 2015
The team are joined by Stereo Kicks to hang out and welcome in the weekend. They try their hand at yodelling, Harvey serves up an FD school dinner to kick-off another listicle, Stereo Kicks perform their new single, "Love Me So" and Molly performs Clean Bandit's "Stronger" to end the show.
99	10	Jamie Flatters & Maverick Sabre	26 June 2015
Jamie Flatters, star of CBBC's So Awkward, joins the team to hang out and welcome in the weekend. Also, Leondre visits Charlie to help look after his bearded dragons. Maverick Sabre performs his new single "Walk Into The Sun" and Bars & Melody close the show with a cover of Justin Bieber's breakout hit "Baby".
100	11	Foxes	3 July 2015
Charlie, Leondre, Akai, Molly, Anais and Harvey hang out and welcome in the weekend. Anais and Molly try out nail marbling, and Foxes performs her new single "Body Talk". Molly closes the song with a cover of Charli XCX's hit single "Famous".
101	12	Fifth Harmony	10 July 2015
Fifth Harmony join Akai, Charlie, Leondre, Anais, Harvey and Molly to hang out and welcome in the weekend. The girls demonstrate hairography, enjoy an afternoon tea and perform their latest single, "Worth It". Anais and Molly show how viewers can style their hair like Elsa from Frozen, and Harvey and Akai visit a trampolining centre. Harvey and Molly sing One Direction's "One Thing" to end the show.
102	13	Little Mix	17 July 2015
Little Mix join Harvey, Akai, Charlie, Leondre, Molly and Anais to hang out, welcome in the weekend and perform their latest single, "Black Magic". Little Mix's Jesy helps Akai get Harvey back with the ultimate prank before the team try to help her with her sandwich phobia. The gang hold their own FD sports day in Harvey's garden, and Bars and Melody perform "Bills" to end the show.
103	14	Callum Wright	24 July 2015
Akai, Charlie, Leondre, Anais, Harvey and Molly hang out and welcome in the weekend. Molly and Leo have a new panoramic photo trick to try, Harvey and Molly head to a golfing range and the team put together their listicle on camping. Popstar Callum Wright performs his single "1,2,3" and Akai joins Molly to perform Ariana Grande's "Problem" to end the show.
104	15	The Vamps	31 July 2015
The Vamps join Charlie, Leondre, Anais, Molly, Akai and Harvey for the final show of the series. The gang audition to become the fifth member of The Vamps, put together a listicle on parties and Akai and Anais head to the park for a picnic. The Vamps perform their track "Risk it All" and the team end the series with S Club 7's "Reach for the Stars".
