= List of Friday Download presenters =

This article lists the presenters from Friday Download.

== Presenters ==
Colour key:
Main presenter Stand-in presenter (in studio) Guest presenter (in downloads) Not in this series

=== Presenters ===
| Presenter | Series 1 | Series 2 | Series 3 | Series 4 | Series 5 | Series 6 | Series 7 | Series 8 | Series 9 | Movie |
|---|---|---|---|---|---|---|---|---|---|---|
| Cel Spellman | | | | | | | | | | |
| Richard Wisker | | | | | | | | | | |
| Dionne Bromfield | | | | | | | | | | |
| Shannon Flynn | | | | | | | | | | |
| George Sear | | | | | | | | | | |
| Aidan Davis | | | | | | | | | | |
| Daniel Pearson | | | | | | | | | | |
| Tyger Drew-Honey | | | | | | | | | | |
| Georgia Lock | | | | | | | | | | |
| Kieran Alleyne | | | | | | | | | | |
| Dani Harmer | | | | | | | | | | |
| Saffron Coomber | | | | | | | | | | |
| Talia Francis | | | | | | | | | | |
| Tyler West | | | | | | | | | | |
| Julie Rogers | | | | | | | | | | |
| Bobby Lockwood | | | | | | | | | | |
| Louisa Connolly-Burnham | | | | | | | | | | |
| Molly Rainford | | | | | | | | | | |
| Anaïs Gallagher | | | | | | | | | | |
| Harvey Cantwell | | | | | | | | | | |
| Akai Osei | | | | | | | | | | |
| Leondre Devries | | | | | | | | | | |
| Charlie Lenehan | | | | | | | | | | |

Leondre Devries is mistakenly credited as Leondre Devires in the first 5 episodes of Series 9.

== Weekly presenters ==
Following Aidan's departure in Series 6, guest presenters weekly replaced the former presenters.

Main Presenter Stand-in/Guest Presenter (in studio) Guest Appearance Not in this Episode

=== Series 7 ===
| Presenter | Episode 1 | Episode 2 | Episode 3 | Episode 4 | Episode 5 | Episode 6 | Episode 7 | Episode 8 |
|---|---|---|---|---|---|---|---|---|
| Dionne Bromfield | | | | | | | | |
| Shannon Flynn | | | | | | | | |
| George Sear | | | | | | | | |
| Ceallach Spellman | | | | | | | | |
| Richard Wisker | | | | | | | | |
| Anaïs Gallagher | | | | | | | | |
| Harvey Cantwell | | | | | | | | |
| The Vamps | | | | | | | | |
| Tinchy Stryder | | | | | | | | |
| Austin Mahone | | | | | | | | |

=== Series 8 ===
| Presenter | Episode 1 | Episode 2 | Episode 3 | Episode 4 | Episode 5 | Episode 6 | Episode 7 | Episode 8 | Episode 9 | Episode 10 | Episode 11 |
|---|---|---|---|---|---|---|---|---|---|---|---|
| Shannon Flynn | | | | | | | | | | | |
| George Sear | | | | | | | | | | | |
| Cel Spellman | | | | | | | | | | | |
| Richard Wisker | | | | | | | | | | | |
| Molly Rainford | | | | | | | | | | | |
| Anaïs Gallagher | | | | | | | | | | | |
| Akai Osei | | | | | | | | | | | |
| Harvey Cantwell | | | | | | | | | | | |
| Jordan Brown | | | | | | | | | | | |
| Dionne Bromfield | | | | | | | | | | | |
| Bars & Melody | | | | | | | | | | | |
