= Teen Spirit =

Teen Spirit may refer to:

- Teen Spirit (deodorant), a deodorant from Colgate-Palmolive
- Teen Spirit (album), a 2001 album by A-Teens
- Teen Spirit (2011 film), a 2011 American television film
- Teen Spirit (EP), a 2016 extended play by Bars and Melody
- Teen Spirit (2018 film), a 2018 American musical drama film
- Teen Spirit: The Tribute to Kurt Cobain, 1996 documentary about Nirvana's lead singer Kurt Cobain
- "Teen Spirit", a 2013 song by SZA

== See also ==
- "Smells Like Teen Spirit", a 1991 song by Nirvana
