= 143 (Bars and Melody album) =

Studio album by Bars and Melody
- Released: 21 August 2015
- Recorded: 2014
- Genre: Hip-hop, R&B
- Length: 35:58 (Standard Edition)
- Label: 143 Records
- Producer: Graham Stack; Jethro Sheeran; Matt Furmidge; Ash Howes; Kevin McPherson

Bars and Melody chronology
Hopeful (2014)	143 (2015)	Teen Spirit (2016)

Singles from 143
- 1. "Hopeful" Released: 27 July 2014; 2. "Keep Smiling" Released: 16 February 2015; 3. "Stay Strong" Released: 5 April 2015

143 is the debut studio album by British pop duo Bars and Melody. It was released in the United Kingdom on 21 August 2015. The album peaked at number 4 on the UK Albums Chart. The album includes the singles "Hopeful", "Keep Smiling" and "Stay Strong".

== Singles ==
"Hopeful" was released as the lead single from the album on 27 July 2014. The song peaked at number 5 on the UK Singles Chart. "Keep Smiling" was released as the second single from the album on 16 February 2015. The song peaked at number 52 on the UK Singles Chart. "Stay Strong" was released as the third single from the album on 5 April 2015. The song peaked at number 53 on the UK Singles Chart.

== Track listing ==
Standard Edition
No.	Title	Writer(s)	Producer(s)	Length
1.	"Hopeful"	Leondre Devries; Charlie Lenehan; Carl Mitchell; Fredrick Taylor; Thomas Calloway	Graham Stack; Matt Furmidge; Ash Howes	2:49
2.	"Breathe"			3:40
3.	"Keep Smiling"			3:01
4.	"Stay Young"	Leondre Devries; Charlie Lenehan; Kevin McPherson	Kevin McPherson	3:28
5.	"Complicated"	Leondre Devries; Charlie Lenehan; Kevin McPherson	Kevin McPherson	3:19
6.	"Stay Strong"			3:28
7.	"Just Remember"			3:57
8.	"Don't Look Back"	Leondre Devries; Charlie Lenehan; Kevin McPherson	Kevin McPherson	3:06
9.	"That Girl"	Leondre Devries; Charlie Lenehan; Kevin McPherson	Kevin McPherson	2:57
10.	"143"			3:35
11.	"Beautiful"	Leondre Devries; Charlie Lenehan; Kevin McPherson	Kevin McPherson	3:13

Deluxe Edition
No.	Title	Writer(s)	Length
12.	"Stay Strong" (Acoustic Version)		3:02
13.	"Beautiful" (Acoustic Version)	Leondre Devries; Charlie Lenehan; Kevin McPherson	3:24

== Charts ==
Chart (2015–16)	Peak position
Irish Albums (IRMA)	11
Polish Albums (ZPAV)	31
Scottish Albums (OCC)	12
UK Albums (OCC)	4

== Certifications ==
Region	Certification	Certified units/sales
Poland (ZPAV)	Platinum	20,000^{‡}
^{‡} Sales+streaming figures based on certification alone.

== Release history ==
Region	Date	Format	Label
United Kingdom	21 August 2015	Digital download, CD	143 Records
