= Juliet Sear =

English baker (born 1974)

- Born: Juliet Grace Walker; 29 April 1974 (age 52); Rochford, Essex, England
- Years active: 2008–present
- Spouse: Simon Sear (m. 1997)
- Children: 3; including George
- Culinary career
- Cooking style: Baking
- Television shows: This Morning; Beautiful Baking with Juliet Sear
- Website: julietsear.co.uk

Juliet Grace Sear (née Walker; born 29 April 1974) is an English baker, writer, and television personality. She is the ITV daytime programme This Morning's resident baker and has authored six baking books.

== Early life ==
Sear was born in Rochford near Southend and grew up in Leigh-on-Sea. She went to university in London. She taught herself to bake and practiced after getting her start baking a cake for her son's fourth birthday.

== Career ==
In 2008, Sear founded her cake bakery Fancy Nancy (originally the Little Venice Cake Company) on Rectory Road in Leigh-on-Sea. Her products were stocked in Harvey Nichols and Fortnum & Mason. Sear taught at Leith's School of Food and Wine and wrote for publications such as LoveFood. In 2012, Sear published her debut book, The Cake Decorating Bible.

Sear featured in the 2013 Cake and Bake Show in Manchester alongside the likes of Paul Hollywood and became a UK ambassador for a range from the American series Cake Boss in 2014. She made cakes for public figures such as Peaches Geldof, Tom Daley, Alan Titchmarsh, and Fearne Cotton. Her second cookbook, Cakeology, was published in 2015. The bakery closed in 2016 when Sear relocated to London.

In 2017, Sear joined ITV's daytime talk show This Morning as its resident baking expert. She also began uploading videos to her YouTube channel and released her third cookbook, Kawaii Cakes. This was followed by her fourth cookbook, Botanical Baking, in 2018. In late 2019, Sear hosted her own 10-part Sunday morning series on ITV, titled Beautiful Baking with Juliet Sear.

By that time, Sear's public figure clientele included Ian McKellen at the Oxford Literary Festival, Louise Roe, Bryan Adams, and Prince Harry. Sear's baking, dinner, snack, and plant-based and vegetarian recipes have appeared in BBC Good Food, Hello!, and SquareMeal. She appeared on the BBC's Good Food Show Winter 2021 and created edible characters for The Great British Bake-Off on Channel 4.

In May 2024, it was announced that HarperCollins had acquired the rights to publish Sear's sixth cookbook, Air Fryer Baking Magic, that July. Upon release, the book became a Sunday Times bestseller. That same year, Sear joined the Guild of Food Writers (GFW) and became an ambassador for the charity Leukaemia UK.

== Personal life ==
Juliet Walker married Simon Sear in 1997. They have three children; their son George and daughter Ruby are both actors, while their eldest Lydia is an artist. Sear previously lived and raised her children in Leigh-on-Sea before moving to Barnsbury, North London.

== Bibliography ==
- The Cake Decorating Bible: Simple Steps to Creating Beautiful Cupcakes, Biscuits, Birthday Cakes and More (2012)
- Cakeology: Over 20 Sensational Step-by-Step Cake Decorating Projects (2015)
- Kawaii Cakes: Adorable and Cute Japanese-Inspired Cakes and Treats (2017)
- Botanical Baking: Contemporary Baking and Cake Decorating with Edible Flowers and Herbs (2018)
- Cute Bakes: Adorable Kawaii-Inspired Cakes and Treats (2021)
- Air Fryer Baking Magic: 100 Incredible Recipes for Every Baking Occasion (2024)
