= Keep Smiling (song) =

Single by Bars and Melody

from the album 143
- Released: 16 February 2015
- Recorded: 2014
- Genre: Pop
- Length: 3:01
- Label: 143 Records

Bars and Melody singles chronology
"Hopeful" (2014)	"Keep Smiling" (2015)	"Stay Strong" (2015)

"Keep Smiling" is a song performed by British pop duo Bars and Melody. The song was released in the United Kingdom as a digital download on 16 February 2015 as the second single from their debut studio album 143 (2015). The song peaked at number 52 on the UK Singles Chart.

== Music video ==
A music video to accompany the release of "Keep Smiling" was first released onto YouTube on 9 February 2015 at a total length of three minutes and four seconds. The video was directed by Ryan Mackfall and produced by Crashburn Media.

== Track listing ==
Digital download
No.	Title	Length
1.	"Keep Smiling"	3:01

== Charts ==
=== Weekly charts ===
Chart (2015)	Peak position
Scotland (OCC)	43
UK Singles (OCC)	52

== Release history ==
Region	Date	Format	Label
United Kingdom	16 February 2015	Digital download	143 Records
