= Belfairs Academy =

Location
- Highlands Boulevard; Leigh-on-Sea, Essex, SS9 3TG; England; 51°33′01″N 0°38′25″E

Information
- Type: Academy
- Motto: Shaping the Future
- Established: 1955
- Local authority: Southend-on-Sea City Council
- Department for Education URN: 138174 Tables
- Ofsted: Reports
- Chair of Governors: Dominic Carver
- Principal: Bev Williams
- Gender: Coeducational
- Age: 11 to 18
- Enrolment: 1324
- Houses: Resolute – Defender – Endeavour
- Colours: Maroon and light blue
- Website: belfairsacademy.org.uk

Belfairs Academy (formerly Belfairs High School) is a non-selective secondary school with academy status in Leigh-on-Sea, Essex.

== Inspection judgements ==
As Belfairs High School, the school was inspected by Ofsted in 2010 and judged Good. Following conversion to an academy, the school was inspected in 2013 and judged Good. A short inspection took place in 2016, and found that the school continued to be good. An inspection took place in 2024, where the school was judged Needs Improvement; teaching was not effective and students' outcomes were too low.

== History ==
In March 1955, UK Minister of Education David Eccles joined local dignitaries at Belfairs High School to open eight schools in the County Borough of Southend-on-Sea.

The opening of these eight schools in the Southend-on-Sea borough would "represent an addition of 3,520 school places." During this period, demand upon the council to increase school locations was driven by a number of factors.

During the Second World War, the County Borough suffered relatively little damage to school buildings. Only two schools were severely bombed, and the post-war urgent need for new school places was therefore only attributable in a small part to war damage. The greatest need was to provide schools for the increased numbers of children of school age, due to an increased total population, the higher birth rate, and the raising of the school leaving age from 14 to 15 in 1947.

With an increase in total school places across the borough, a large proportion of these places were created in the development of Belfairs High School. Belfairs was originally conceived as a comprehensive school for 1,600 boys but due to the 'changes in national economy and the need for more school places' the site was developed into two 'Modern Secondary Schools,' Belfairs High School for boys and Belfairs High School for girls.

The two schools were created to serve the area of Leigh-on-Sea, with a zone extending from the western boundary of the County Borough to Southbourne Grove and Crowstone Road. They replaced the former West Leigh High School, which was part of an "all-age" school built before the First World War.

In July 2009, the school was given permission for a £24 million rebuild. Belfairs High School was the only school in Southend to be completely rebuilt under the previous government's 'Building School's for the Future' scheme.

In September 2011, the newly built school building was opened.

In March 2012, Belfairs was granted Academy Status coinciding with a newly appointed head, taking responsibility from Headteacher John Duprey, Beverly Williams.

In January 2015, it was announced that Belfairs Academy and Cecil Jones College would be combined to form an academy trust with Beverly Williams as Executive Headteacher, headquartered at Belfairs Academy Site.

== Academic standards ==
Students' achievement is good with 69% of students achieving 5 A*-C GCSE grades (including English and Maths) in 2013 against a national average of 59%.

== Notable former students ==
- The Most Revd Stephen Cottrell, Archbishop of York
- Robert Daws, actor
- Alfie Lewis, footballer
- John Pantry, singer-songwriter
- George Sear, actor
- Maisie Smith, actress in EastEnders
- Elizabeth Dormer-Phillips, actress in Fortitude, Off the Rails
