= Stay Strong =

Single by Bars and Melody

from the album 143
- Released: 5 April 2015
- Recorded: 2014
- Genre: Pop
- Length: 2:52
- Label: Self-released

Bars and Melody singles chronology
"Keep Smiling" (2015)	"Stay Strong" (2015)	"I Won't Let You Go" (2017)

"Stay Strong" is a song performed by British pop duo Bars and Melody. The song was released in the United Kingdom as a digital download on 5 April 2015 as the third single from their debut studio album 143 (2015). The song peaked at number 53 on the UK Singles Chart.

== Music video ==
A music video to accompany the release of "Stay Strong" was first released onto YouTube on 4 April 2015 at a total length of three minutes and twenty seconds. The video was directed by Ryan Mackfall and produced by Crashburn Media.

== Track listing ==
Digital download
No.	Title	Length
1.	"Stay Strong" (Single Version)	2:52
2.	"Stay Strong" (Acoustic Version)	3:02
3.	"Stay Strong" (Single Version)	3:28

== Charts ==
Chart (2015)	Peak position
Scotland (OCC)	48
UK Singles (OCC)	53

== Release history ==
Region	Date	Format	Label
United Kingdom	5 April 2015	Digital download	Self-released
