= Lukas Rieger =

German singer

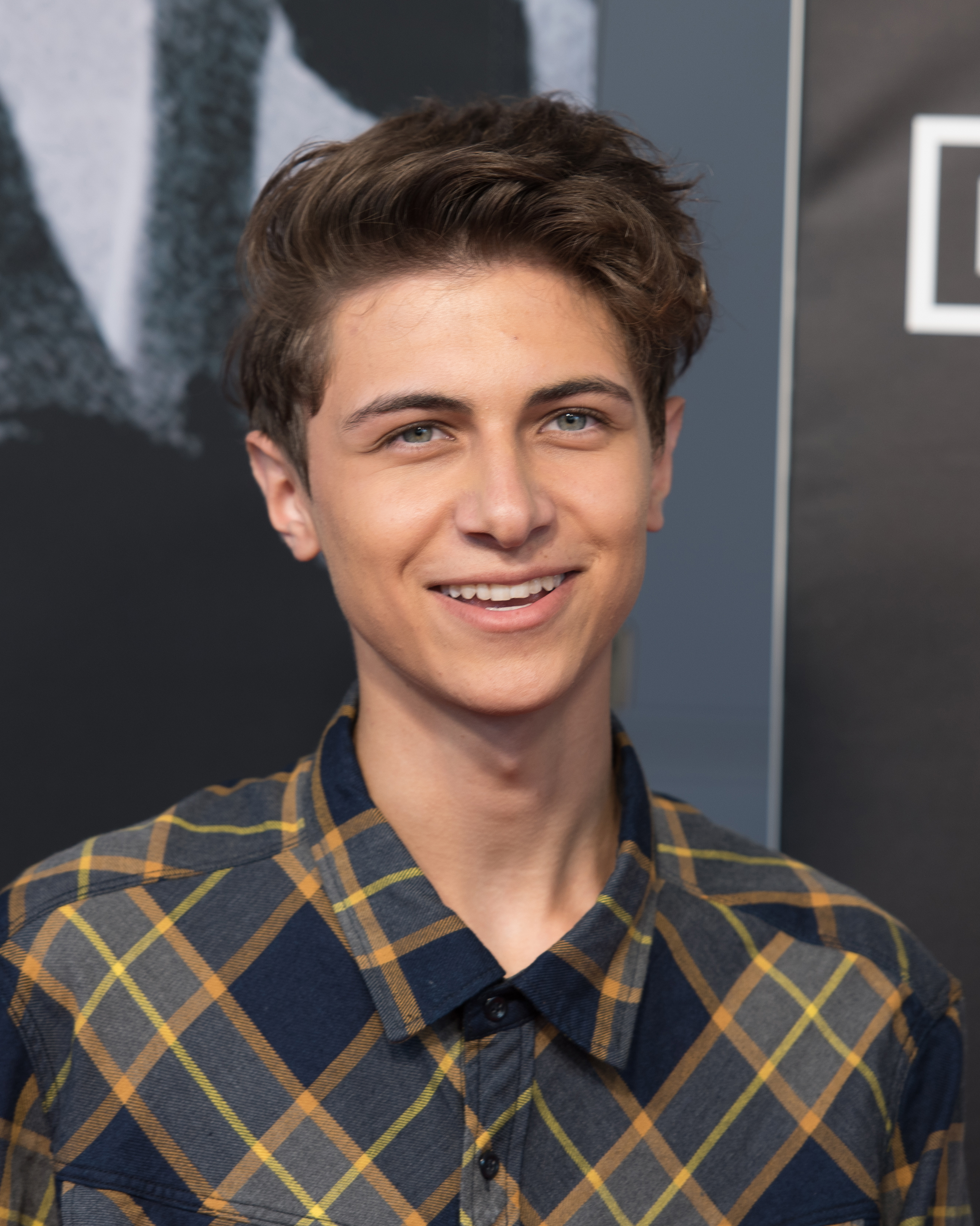
- Rieger at the Global Citizen Festival Hamburg 2017
- Born: 3 June 1999 (age 27); Hannover, Germany
- Occupation: Singer
- Years active: 2014–present

Lukas Rieger (born 3 June 1999) is a German singer. He predominantly sings in English.

== Early life and career ==
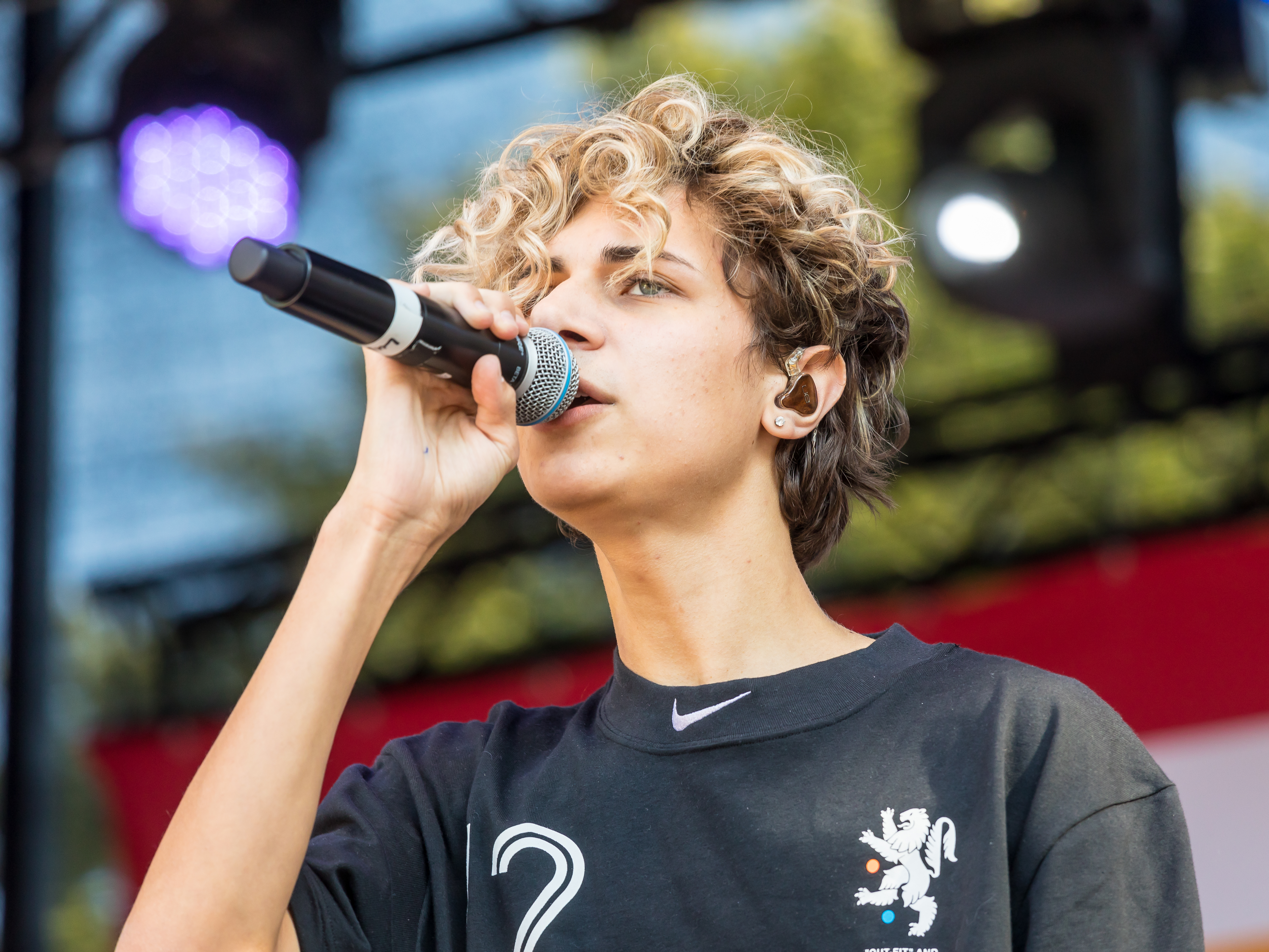
Lukas Rieger performing on the Cologne Pride 2018

Rieger was born on 3 June 1999 to Michael and Birgit in Hannover, Lower Saxony. He attended music classes in the Burgdorf grammar school during his childhood.

In 2014, he took part in the casting show, The Voice Kids, where he performed on the blind auditions. During a performance of "Can't Hold Us" by rapper Macklemore, the judge and singer-songwriter Lena Meyer-Landrut selected him to be part of her team. However, Rieger did not reach the finals.

He worked on building up a fan base through social media. His Instagram account recorded over 1.7 million subscribers in March 2017, and his user account on the app TikTok (Musical.ly) over 2.4 million fans. His YouTube channel had over 410,000 subscribers by December 2016, and more than 21 million views of his videos.

In October 2016, after the release of his first album Compass, a signing session in Ulm had to be stopped by police because some fans fainted. Previously, a similar event in Stuttgart lured over 2000 mostly female fans. The management then announced that they would no longer be able to organize such "meet-and-greets".

In 2018, Rieger released his second album called "Code" and toured around Germany, Austria, Switzerland, and the Czech Republic.

In 2019, he took part in the 12th season of the RTL dance show Let's Dance. He was eliminated during the 3rd episode, together with this dance partner Katja Kalugina, due to too few viewer votes. They later had a relationship with each other but it only lasted a month. In 2019, he also acted the role of the singer Marlon in the movie Mein Lotta-Leben - Alles Bingo mit Flamingo!, which is based on the successful children's book series Mein Lotta-Leben by Alice Pantermüller.

== Personal life ==
Rieger's parents are named Michael and Birgit. He has an older sister named Marie.

In 2017, he published his autobiography called "Code", which focused on his life, his dreams, and fears. He also talks about his friends, family, and career.

Rieger has sometimes been referred to as "the German Justin Bieber", and he has covered the Canadian artist's song "Take You".

Aside from singing, he has created numerous TikTok videos and has 3.5 million followers (as of 1 February 2021). He also vlogs on his YouTube channel "Life Of Lukas", which focuses on his everyday routines.

As of February 2021, he is creating content as an influencer on the app YEAY.

== Discography ==
Chart placements

(provisional) Explanation of the data

Albums

Compass
(DE)	4	07.10.2016	(2 wk)
AT	11	14.10.2016	(1 week)
CH	48	09.10.2016	(1 week)

=== Albums ===
- Compass (30 September 2016)
- Code (16 February 2018)
- Justice (17 May 2019)

=== Singles ===
- "Be My Baby" (publication: 15 November 2014)
- "Ready 4 This Shit" (8 February 2015)
- "Lightspeed Lovers" (9 October 2015)
- "Elevate" (20 May 2016)
- "Let Me Know" (19 August 2016)
- "Side by Side" (31 March 2017)
- "Slomo" (8 December 2017)
- "Treasure" (2 February 2018)
- "Never Be This Young" (16 February 2018)
- "Won't Forget About You" (25 May 2018)
- "Nobody Knows Me (Like You Do)" (March 2019)
