= Teen Spirit (EP) =

EP by Bars and Melody
- Released: 26 August 2016
- Recorded: 2015
- Genre: Hip-hop; Rap
- Label: Zeneration Records

Bars and Melody chronology
143 (2015)	Teen Spirit (2016)	Generation Z (2017)

Teen Spirit is the debut extended play by British pop duo Bars and Melody. It was released in the United Kingdom on the 26 August 2016. The album peaked at number 49 on the UK Albums Chart and number 85 on the Irish Albums Chart.

== Track listing ==
No.	Title	Length
1.	"Turn It Up"	3:16
2.	"Unite (Live Forever)"	3:45
3.	"Right for You"	3:39
4.	"Battle Scars"	3:09
5.	"No Way"	3:34

== Charts ==
=== Weekly charts ===
Chart (2016)	Peak position
Irish Albums (IRMA)	85
Polish Albums (ZPAV)	4
Scottish Albums (OCC)	97
UK Albums (OCC)	49

== Release history ==
Region	Date	Format	Label
United Kingdom	26 August 2016	Digital download, CD	Zeneration Records
