= Bars and Melody =

2014–2025 British rap duo

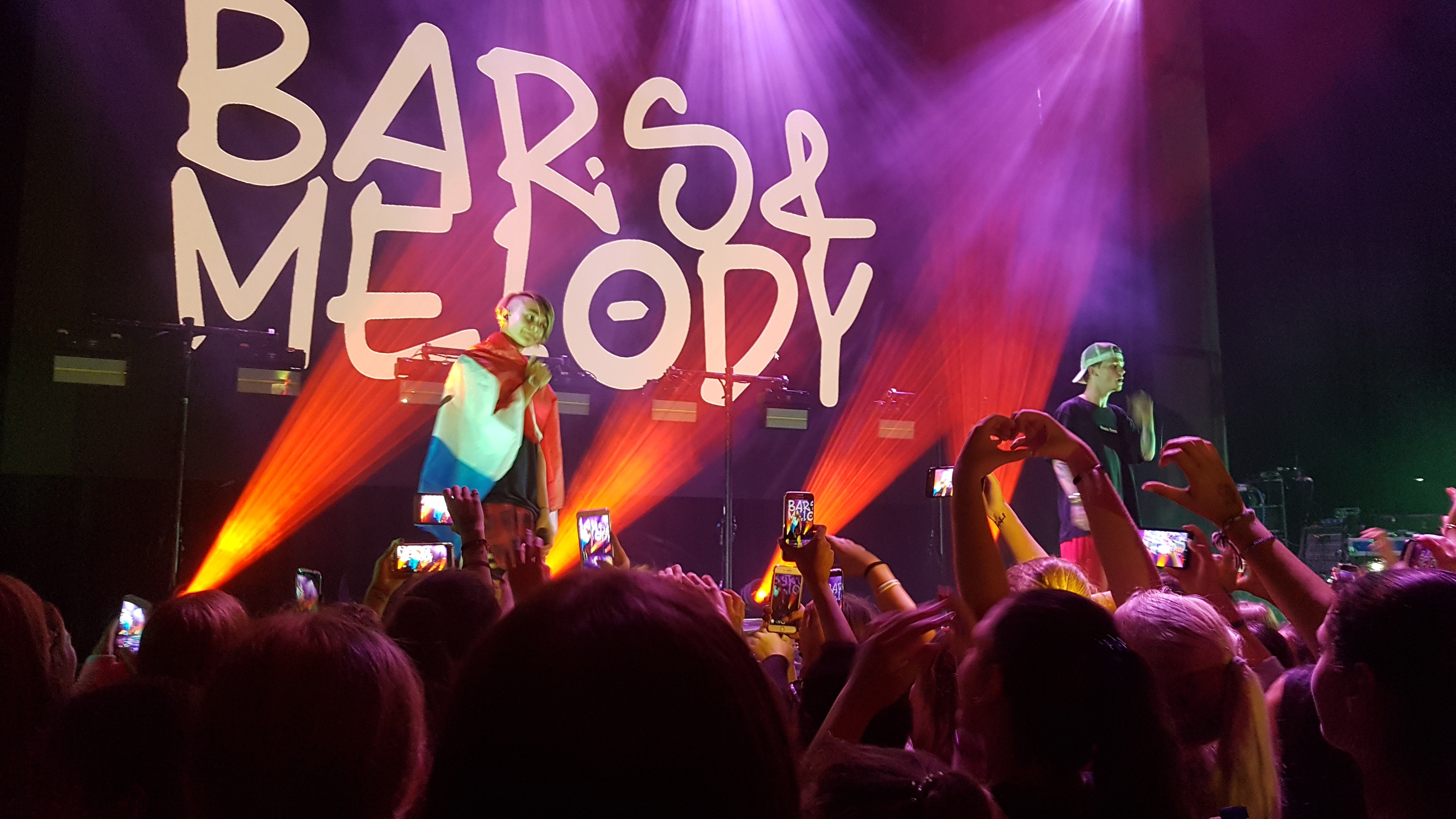

Background information
- Also known as: BAM
- Origin: Wales
- Genres: Hip hop, R&B
- Years active: 2014–2025
- Labels: Syco Music, Universal Music Group, Zeneration Records, BetterNow Records,
- Members: Leondre Devries; Charlie Lenehan
- Website: barsandmelody.tv

Bars and Melody (often abbreviated as BAM) were an R&B and rap duo consisting of rapper Leondre Devries and singer Charlie Lenehan. BAM took part in the eighth series of Britain's Got Talent in 2014. During their audition, they were automatically sent into the semifinals of the competition after the head judge, Simon Cowell, pressed the golden buzzer. They ultimately finished in third place in the series. Their first single after the show, "Shining Star", was released on 30 July 2014, accompanied by an acoustic version of their song "Hopeful".

Bars and Melody released their debut studio album, 143, on 21 August 2015. It debuted at number four on the Official UK Charts. Their EP Teen Spirit was released in 2016. BAM later released Generation Z (2017) and Sadboi (2020). A 2021 EP entitled Carpe Diem signaled a change in their sound. Bars and Melody disbanded in 2025.

== History ==
=== 2013–15: Formation, Britain's Got Talent and 143 ===
Devries and Lenehan first met on social media in September 2013, after Devries had seen Lenehan's videos. They first met in person in January 2014 to form a music duo as Bars and Melody. On 8 February 2014, Bars and Melody auditioned in Manchester for the eighth series of Britain's Got Talent. They performed a song based on Twista and Faith Evans' "Hope", with Devries replacing the original verses with ones protesting against bullying. After the performance, Simon Cowell pressed the golden buzzer, sending them straight to the live semifinals. Before the semifinals, the group appeared and performed on The Ellen DeGeneres Show in the United States. In the BGT semi-final on 29 May, they performed Puff Daddy and Faith Evans' "I'll Be Missing You", coupled with new verses about someone who had recently lost a friend; audience were given candles to wave during the performance. They won their semi-final and progressed through to the final, where they performed the song they sang in their audition and ultimately finished third behind Lucy Kay and Collabro. According to Billboard magazine, the video of their audition was number six in the top ten trending videos for 2014.

Despite not winning, Bars and Melody signed a £500,000 record deal with Simon Cowell's record label, Syco, which released "Hopeful" in July 2014. Their debut single went straight to number five on the UK Singles Chart. The music video of their song "Hopeful" was released on YouTube on 7 July 2014. To promote the song, they appeared on television shows such as Good Morning Britain, This Morning, and The Official Chart on BBC Radio 1. By late September, the song "Hopeful" was number 33 on the Twitter Top Tracks. Bars and Melody also participated in their first HMV signing tour to promote Hopeful. They released the song "Shining Star", which came out as part of Hopeful Acoustic. Their second single, "Keep Smiling", was released on 28 February 2015, with a music video filmed in Plymouth. It peaked at 52 in the Official Charts Company. Their third official single, "Stay Strong", was released on 18 April 2015 and peaked at 53 in the Official Charts Company. Two physical editions of the CD could be purchased with each one containing an image of either Lenehan or Devries, promoted through a second HMV signing tour. They released their fourth single "Beautiful" in June 2015 alongside a music video.

The group released their debut album, 143, on 21 August 2015, which peaked at number four on the UK Albums Chart on 28 August 2015. The album included their previously recorded singles and additional songs. To promote the album, they toured across the United Kingdom in the summer and had a winter tour in the United Kingdom, the Netherlands and Poland, where the album went platinum. Following a guest presenting stint in 2014, Bars and Melody made a red carpet appearance at the premiere of CBBC show Friday Download in May 2015. They also participated in the Friday Download movie called Up All Night. They performed the third ending theme "Unite (Live Forever)" for the anime series Future Card Buddyfight Triple D. They appeared on BBC's Newsround during a week-long series about bullying in February 2015.

=== 2016–18: Teen Spirit and Generation Z ===
In 2016, they toured five cities with Kiera Weathers, a contestant on The X Factor, in February and April of that year. The cities included London, Birmingham, Bristol, Glasgow, and Liverpool. They also became ambassadors for the Anti Bullying Charity campaign that year. In August 2016, their album Teen Spirit was released by Syco. They toured Australia and Japan by August 2016.

In August 2016 they released their first Japanese album, titled Hopeful by Avex Music Creative, including fourteen tracks from the UK albums 143 and Teen Spirit as well as UK and Japanese versions of Hopeful. They toured thirteen cities in Austria, Germany and Switzerland in November and December, opening for German teen singer Lukas Rieger.

On 15 February 2017 they released their second Japanese album, entitled Never Give Up. The album was released by Rhythm Sound, a division of Avex Music Creative. They announced the immediate digital release of new song "Faded" on 14 April. Also in April, they toured ten cities in the UK opening for the dance troupe Diversity. On 27 May, they released a song called "Thousand Years," which has a music video with over 28 million views on YouTube as of 14 November 2019. On 1 September they released a new album entitled Generation Z.

In early 2018, Bars and Melody went on their Generation Z Tour around Europe. On 12 October 2018, they released a single called "Put Ü First". They also announced and had shows in Tokyo, Nagoya and Osaka, Japan in December.

=== 2019–2025: Love To See Me Fail, Sadboi, Carpe Diem and farewell tour ===
In early 2019, Bars and Melody released a single from their upcoming album called Love To See Me Fail. Just a few weeks after that, Bars and Melody embarked on their Choke Tour from late March to mid-May. On 26 July, they released their long-awaited single "Waiting for the Sun" on YouTube, Apple Music, Spotify and deezer. In late August, they competed on Britain's Got Talent: The Champions where they sang "Waiting for the Sun" in week 5 and reached the final.

On 4 October, BAM released their single "Lighthouse". They also set to embark on their primarily-UK tour Lighthouse from October until early November, along with 3 shows in Japan in mid-January 2020. On 13 December, they released the single "Teenage Romance", featuring Mike Singer. On 7 December, they announced their album Sadboi would be released in 2020.

On 27 January, BAM competed on America's Got Talent: The Champions. On 6 March, their new single "Ain't Got You" was released. On 13 March, they made a surprise drop with their new song "Invisible". On 27 March 2020, their album Sadboi was finally released. In late March, they had to postpone their Sadboi tour due to the COVID-19 outbreak.

On 15 January 2021, Bars and Melody released the album Carpe Diem, starting with hit single "Own Ways".

In July 2024, BAM announced that they would part ways as a duo after a farewell tour. On March 14, 2025, Bars & Melody performed their final concert ever in Warsaw, Poland, at VooDoo Club. The date, 14.03, was very special for both the duo and their fans, as it was a reference to their first album, 143.

== Members ==
=== Leondre Devries (Bars) ===
Leondre Antonio Devries was born on 6 October 2000 to stonemason Antonio and personal trainer Victoria Lee. From Port Talbot, Neath Port Talbot, Wales, he has three older brothers—Jacob Lee, Joseph Devries (Joey), the eldest is Ben Lee —and a younger sister, Matilda Devries (Tilly). Joey was part of the boy band Overload Generation who participated in the eleventh series of The X Factor. Leondre Devries has spoken openly about his experiences of bullying for four years before he switched schools. He attended the Glan Afan Comprehensive School at the time of the Britain's Got Talent competition. Previously he rapped solo under the stage name 'Little Dre'. In December 2023, Devries revealed on Instagram that his brother Jacob had died earlier in the month.

=== Charlie Lenehan (Melody) ===
Charlie Joe Lenehan-Green was born 27 October 1998 in Frampton Cotterell in Gloucestershire. He lives in London. His family includes his mother, his step-father, a businessman; and a younger sister, Brooke. His mother, Karen James, is a cook in Thornbury at Gillingstool and New Siblands schools. Lenehan took up singing at the age of 11 when his schoolmates invited him to join a band. He attended the Winterbourne International Academy from the age of 11, and was interested in drama, music, and engineering at the time of the competition. He returned to school the first day after the Britain's Got Talent finale. In June 2022, Lenehan welcomed a daughter named Delilah.

== Lawsuit ==
Antonio Devries, Leondre's father, threatened to file a suit against the group in March 2016, claiming that he wrote Hopeful. He also claimed that he helped promote the boys until their Britain's Got Talent contest, that he was unhappy that the boys were moving away from the anti-bullying theme, and believed that their management overworked them. He said that he did not have any issues with Bars and Melody, but he took over the boys' social media accounts and posted music from his son Joey and other artists he represented until the management team regained control of the accounts. The management team, who Devries said was the root of the problem, stated that the boys wrote "Hopeful". A spokesperson for the boys shared that they were happy with their career and management team and did not feel exploited or overworked. The official statement was that "Bars and Melody are sorry to hear that legal action is being threatened and they hope it will [be] resolved quickly and amicably."

== Discography ==
=== Studio albums ===
Title	Details	Peak chart positions				Certification
Title	Details	UK	IRE	POL	SCO	Certification
143	Released: 21 August 2015; Label: 143 Records; Formats: Digital download, CD	4	11	31	12	ZPAV: Platinum
Generation Z	Release date: 1 September 2017; Label: Zeneration Records; Formats: Digital download, CD	83	—	3	54	
Sadboi	Release date: 27 March 2020; Label: Better Now, Universal Music; Formats: Digital download, CD	—	—	38	—	
"—" denotes an album that did not chart or was not released.

=== Extended plays ===
Title	Details	Peak chart positions			
Title	Details	UK	IRE	POL	SCO
Hopeful	Released: 25 July 2014; Label: Syco Music; Formats: Digital download	—	—	—	—
Teen Spirit	Released: 26 August 2016; Label: Zeneration Records; Formats: Digital download	49	85	4	97
Carpe Diem	Released: 24 September 2021; Label: Bars and Melody; Formats: Digital download	—	—	—	—
"—" denotes an album that did not chart or was not released.

=== Singles ===
==== As lead artist ====
Title	Year	Peak chart positions			Certifications	Album
Title	Year	UK	IRE	SCO	Certifications	Album
"Hopeful"	2014	5	56	6	BPI: Silver	143
"Keep Smiling"	2015	52	—	43		143
"Stay Strong"	2015	53	—	48		143
"Battle Scars"	2016	—	—	—		Teen Spirit
"Live Your Life"	2016	—	—	—		Generation Z
"I Won't Let You Go"	2017	—	—	—		Generation Z
"Thousand Years"	2017	—	—	—		Generation Z
"Put U First"	2018	—	—	—		Non-album single
"Love To See Me Fail"	2019	—	—	—		Sadboi
"Waiting For the Sun"	2019	—	—	—		Sadboi
"Lighthouse"	2019	—	—	—		Sadboi
"Teenage Romance" (with Mike Singer)	2019	—	—	—		Sadboi
"Own Ways"	2020	—	—	—		Carpe Diem
"Ain't Got You"	2020	—	—	—		Sadboi
"Invisible"	2020	—	—	—		Sadboi
"Bali"	2021	—	—	—		Non-album singles
"Commotion"	2021	—	—	—		Non-album singles
"Fan"	2021	—	—	—		Non-album singles
"Henny"	2021	—	—	—		Non-album singles
"Holiday"	2021	—	—	—		Non-album singles
"Pneumonia"	2022	—	—	—		Non-album singles
"FaceTime Love"	2022	—	—	—		Non-album singles
"Dumb"	2022	—	—	—		Non-album singles
"Medicine"	2022	—	—	—		Non-album singles
"Down"	2022	—	—	—		Non-album singles
"Cake"	2023	—	—	—		Non-album singles
"Angels and Demons"	2023	—	—	—		Non-album singles
"Heart"	2023	—	—	—		Non-album singles
"Uh Oh"	2023	—	—	—		Non-album singles
"Fuck You"	2023	—	—	—		Non-album singles
"My Love"	2023	—	—	—		Non-album singles
"Love Me"	2023	—	—	—		Non-album singles
"Psycho"	2023	—	—	—		Non-album singles
"1 by 1"	2023	—	—	—		Non-album singles
"Honest"	2023	—	—	—		Non-album singles
"Chosen"	2024	—	—	—		Non-album singles
"Say You Are"	2024	—	—	—		Non-album singles
"—" denotes a single that did not chart or was not released.

==== Promotional singles ====
Title	Year	Album
"Beautiful"	2015	143
"Unite (Live Forever)"	2016	Teen Spirit
"Never Give Up"	2017	Never Give Up
"It Ain't Me"	2017	Covers 2
"Thousand Years"	2017	Generation Z
"I Won't Let You Go"	2017	Generation Z
"Live Your Life"	2017	Generation Z
"Faded"	2017	Generation Z
"Fast Car"	2017	Generation Z
"Better Now"	2018	Non-album singles
"Lucid Dreams"	2018	Non-album singles
"Falling Down"	2018	Non-album singles
"Put Ü First"	2018	Non-album singles
