= Hopeful (Bars and Melody song) =

Single by Bars and Melody

from the album 143
- Released: 25 July 2014
- Recorded: 2014
- Genre: Hip hop; pop; R&B
- Length: 2:49
- Label: Syco Music
- Songwriter(s): Leondre Devries; Charlie Lenehan; Carl Mitchell; Fredrick Taylor; Thomas DeCarlo Callaway
- Producer(s): Graham Stack; Matt Furmidge; Ash Howes

Bars & Melody singles chronology
"Hopeful" (2014)	"Keep Smiling" (2015)

"Hopeful" is the debut single by British pop duo Bars and Melody. It is based on the lyrics and music of Twista's 2005 song "Hope", featuring Faith Evans. The song was released on 25 July 2014 through Syco Music. It debuted at number 5 on the UK Singles Chart, with sales of 40,191.

== Background ==
Bars and Melody first performed the song when they auditioned for the eighth series of Britain's Got Talent in February 2014. They received judge Simon Cowell's golden buzzer and went straight through to the live shows. On 7 June, the duo finished in third place during the live final.

On 15 June, it was announced that Bars and Melody had signed to Cowell's record label Syco Music. It was later revealed that they would release their version of "Hope" (retitled "Hopeful") as their debut single on 27 July.

== Promotion ==
To promote the song, they appeared on television shows such as This Morning and Good Morning Britain as well as The Official Chart on BBC Radio 1 the day the song debuted.

== Music video ==
The music video was released to YouTube on 7 July 2014. It has since amassed over 124 million views over several videos.

== Track listing ==
Digital download
No.	Title	Length
1.	"Hopeful"	2:49

Digital EP
No.	Title	Length
1.	"Hopeful"	2:49
2.	"Hopeful" (Liam Keegan Remix)	2:42
3.	"Hopeful" (Local F Remix)	3:34
4.	"Hopeful" (Summer Jam Remix)	3:13

CD single/Acoustic Digital EP
No.	Title	Length
1.	"Hopeful"	2:49
2.	"Hopeful" (Acoustic)	2:50
3.	"Shining Star"	3:38

== Charts ==
Chart (2014–2016)	Peak position
Ireland (IRMA)	56
Japan Hot Overseas (Billboard)	1
Japan Radio Songs (Billboard)	2
Scotland (OCC)	6
UK Singles (OCC)	5

== Certifications ==
Region	Certification	Certified units/sales
United Kingdom (BPI)	Silver	200,000^{‡}
^{‡} Sales+streaming figures based on certification alone.

== Release history ==
Region	Date	Format	Label
United Kingdom	25 July 2014	Digital download	Syco Music
