= George Sear =

British actor (born 1997)

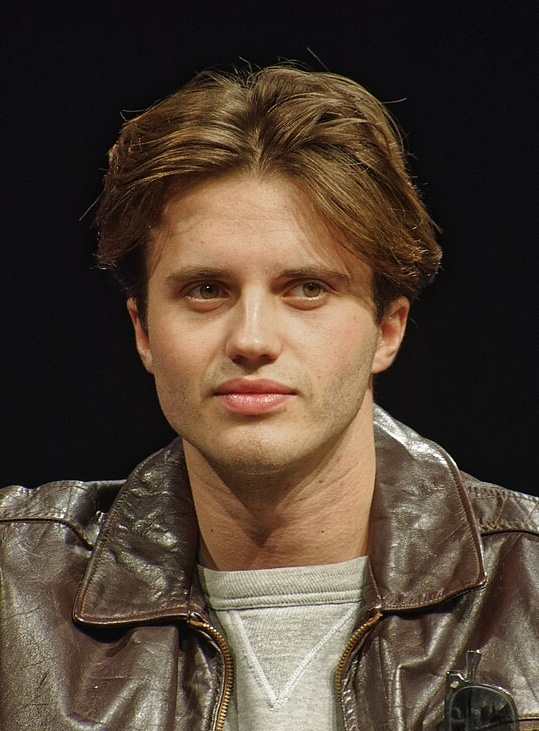
- Sear at the 2022 Comic-Con Germany Stuttgart
- Born: George Harry Sear; 14 November 1997 (age 28)
- Years active: 2009–present
- Mother: Juliet Sear

George Harry Sear (born 14 November 1997) is an English actor, presenter, and filmmaker. He began his career as a child actor on the West End and presented Friday Download (2013–2014) for CBBC. On television, he is known for his roles in the Disney Channel series The Evermoor Chronicles (2014–2016) and the Hulu series Love, Victor (2020–2022).

== Early life and education ==
From Leigh-on-Sea, Sear is the son of celebrity baker Juliet Sear. He attended Leigh North Street Primary School and Belfairs Academy. He also took classes at Singer Stage School.

== Career ==
Sear practiced break dancing since his childhood. He competed in the United Dance Organisation World Championship 2012, where he achieved second place. He also appeared on the show Alesha's Street Dance Stars.

In 2008, Sear played the role of the boy in Samuel Beckett's play Waiting for Godot at the Theatre Royal, where he worked together with Sir Patrick Stewart.

He had his first professional television appearance in the ITV series The Bill as the character Noah Morris in 2009. His first major success was in the British television show Friday Download, where he was a presenter. The role of Seb Crossley in the Disney Channel series The Evermoor Chronicles from 2014 to 2016 was his first major acting role.

His most recent and well-known role is the role of Benji Campbell in the Hulu series Love, Victor, where he portrays the love interest of Victor Salazar, played by co-star Michael Cimino. The television series continues in the universe of the 2018 film Love, Simon and is centered around Victor who attends the same high school as Simon Spier from the original film. Victor is a Latin teen who has to deal with adjusting to a new city and school while trying to figure out his sexuality. The struggles intensify when he realises he falling in love with his classmate Benji.

== Filmography ==
=== Film ===
Year	Title	Role	Notes
2015	Friday Download: The Movie	Self - Presenter	Also known as Up All Night
2021	Reefa	Etone	
TBA	Desperate Journey †	Eric	

==== Filmmaking credits ====
Year	Title	Director	Producer	Writer	Notes	Refs.
2019	When Fate Calls	Yes	No	Yes	short film	
TBA	Scott †	Yes	Yes	Yes	short film	

=== Television ===
Year	Title	Role	Notes
2009	The Bill	Noah Morris	2 episodes
2013–2014	Friday Download	Self - Presenter	9 episodes
2014–2016	The Evermoor Chronicles	Seb Crossley	Main role; 24 episodes
2017	Will	Billy Cooper	7 episodes
2018	Into the Badlands	Arthur	3 episodes
2020	Alex Rider	Parker Roscoe	5 episodes
2020–2022	Love, Victor	Benjamin "Benji" Campbell	Main role; 28 episodes
2023	Fire Country	Ride Operator	Episode: "A Fair to Remember"
2023	Based on a True Story	Jacob	Episode: "Love You, Buzzfeed"

== Audio ==
Year	Title	Role	Notes
Hollow's Bend: The Radio Play	Andres	3 episodes	
