= Akai Osei =

British actor, dancer, presenter and musician

- Born: Akai Milan Osei-Mansfield; 12 April 1999 (age 27); Lambeth, London, England
- Occupations: Actor, dancer, rapper, singer and presenter
- Years active: 2010–present
- Family: Jennifer Osei (mother); Rico Mansfield (father); Ashanti Osei-Mansfield (sister)

Akai Osei (born 12 April 1999) is a British actor, dancer, presenter and musician, who is best known for winning the first series of Got to Dance in February 2010. It is reported that he was inspired by Michael Jackson, Diversity, Flawless and Chris Brown. Akai joined the acting scene shortly after winning Got to Dance. He appears in the film StreetDance 3D alongside Diversity, George Sampson and Flawless, and its sequel, StreetDance 2.

Osei also appeared in Boy Blue Entertainment's street dance hip-hop show Pied Piper – A Hip-Hop Dance Revolution. Osei appeared in the music video for the N-Dubz song "We Dance On" in 2010, which was the main song on the soundtrack for the film StreetDance 3D. He also appeared in an advert for Ministry of Sound Street Dance 2010 CD.

Osei has joined the cast of Into the Hoods. Osei appeared on Blue Peter in mid 2010 and also featured in the annual dance show "Streets Ahead" in London 2010, which featured many dance crews and schools, including Peridot. He is featured in the song by Wretch 32, Unorthodox, featuring Example. He is seen dancing on a rooftop.

In July 2011, Akai was a judge on a talent show on Disney Channel, called Shake It Up Dance Dance. His most recent work was starring in CBBC's 4 O'Clock Club playing Josh's cousin, Nero. From Series 4 to Series 7, he stars as the show's main character as to previously being a series regular in the third series. He also made a guest appearance in Series 8

His character left in the fourth episode of Season 7, because his character was moved to America with his temporal guardian and his girlfriend but he returned as a guest appearance in Series 8 as well as appearing in the Flashbacks for Series 7 and 8 (2018–2020).

== Television ==
Year	Title	Role	Notes
2013	Whats Cooking?	Guest/Himself	Season 1 Episode 61
2014–2015	Friday Download (Series 8)	Himself	Presenter (Season 8 + 9)
2014–2020	4 O'Clock Club	Nero Johnson	Series Regular (Series 3); Main Role (Series 4 to 7); Guest appearance (Series 8 Episode 9); Guest Appearance (Flashbacks (2018–2020)); 59 episodes in total
2014	4 O'Clock Files	Nero Johnson	Regular
2016	Horrible Histories: Gory Games (Series 4)	Himself	Contestant
2017	Drunk History	King Charles II	Season 3 Episode 8

== Filmography ==
Year	Title	Role	Notes
2010	StreetDance 3D	Dancing Kid in Shopping Mall	
2011	Horrid Henry: The Movie	Talent Show Contestant (uncredited)	
2012	StreetDance 2	Junior	
2013	All Stars	Jaden (as Akai Osei-Mansfield)	

== Awards and nominations ==
Year	Nominated work	Category	Award	Result	Notes	Ref.
2011	Honorary Award	Young Achiever Award	BEFFTA	Won		
2014	4 O'Clock Club	Best Children's Performer	BAFTA	Nominated	Role: Nero Johnson	
