= Friday Download =

- Title card for Series 9 (2015)
- Starring: Cel Spellman (1–8); Richard Wisker (1–8); Dionne Bromfield (1–8); Aidan Davis (1–6); Tyger Drew-Honey (1–5); Georgia Lock (1–5); Shannon Flynn (3–8); Daniel Pearson (3–5); George Sear (5–8); Anaïs Gallagher (7–9); Harvey Cantwell (7–9); Molly Rainford (8–9); Akai Osei (8–9); Charlie Lenehan (8–9); Leondre Devries (8–9)
- Original language: English
- No. of series: 9
- No. of episodes: 104 (list of episodes)

Production
- Running time: 60 minutes (2011–2014); 30 minutes (2015)
- Production company: Saltbeef Productions

Original release
- Network: CBBC Channel
- Release: 6 May 2011 – 31 July 2015

Friday Download was a British children's entertainment television programme, produced by Saltbeef Productions on CBBC. It was premiered on 6 May 2011. The final presenting team consisted of Molly Rainford, Anaïs Gallagher, Harvey Cantwell, Akai Osei, Leondre Devries and Charlie Lenehan. The show ran for nine series from 2011 until 2015.

== Episodes ==
Series	Episodes	Originally released	
Series	Episodes	First released	Last released
1	13	6 May 2011	29 July 2011
Christmas Download		16 December 2011	
2	12	6 January 2012	30 March 2012
3	13	27 April 2012	20 July 2012
4	7 (Note: Including specials/previews)	23 November 2012	4 January 2013
5	10	26 April 2013	28 June 2013
6	14	20 September 2013	20 December 2013
7	8	16 May 2014	11 July 2014
8	11	4 October 2014	13 December 2014
9	15	25 April 2015	31 July 2015

== Tyger vs ==
Tyger vs was a segment of the Games Download in the first four series, where presenter Tyger Drew-Honey went head-to-head against one of the other presenters (or occasionally guests) in either a video or physical game.

=== Series 1 ===
Week	Game Name	Tyger vs...	Winner
1	Springtime	Cel	Cel
2	Kinect Sports	Richard	Tyger
3	Just Dance 2	Dionne	Dionne
4	We Sing Encore	Richard	Tyger
5	Joy Ride	Cel	Tyger
6	ModNation Racers	Dionne	Tyger
7	Wii Sports Resort	Richard	Tyger
8	Kinect Adventures	Aidan	Aidan
9	Wii Play Motion	Aidan	Aidan
10	Sing Star	Georgia	Georgia
11	Just Dance	Dionne	Dionne
12	Wii Party	Richard	Tyger
13	Sing Star	Ceallach	Cel
Series Winner(s)			Team (6 - 7)

=== Series 2 ===
Week	Game	Tyger vs...	Winner
1	Raving Rabbids: Alive & Kicking	Aidan	Tyger
2	Connect 4 Launchers	Ceallach	Tyger
3	Dance Star Party	Dionne	Tyger
4	Swimming	Richard	Tyger
5	Start the Party! Save the World	Tinchy Stryder	Tyger
6	Donkey Derby	Georgia	Tyger
7	Posing	Aidan	Aidan
8	Toy Basketball	Richard	Richard
9	Elefun	Aidan	Aidan
10	-	Dionne	Dionne
11	Mario & Sonic at the London 2012 Olympic Games	Ceallach	Ceallach
12	Hoops	Richard	Tyger
Series Winner(s)			Tyger (7 - 5)

=== Series 3 ===
Week	Game	Tyger vs...	Winner
1	Just Dance 3	Cel	Tyger
2	Doh-Nutters	Aidan	Tyger
3	Bow and arrow	Richard	Tyger
4	Water Stream	Dionne	Tyger
5	Wii Party	Georgia	Georgia
6	Kinect Sports: Season Two	Aidan	Aidan
7	Singing	Cel	Cel
8	Basketball	Dionne	Dionne
9	Dance Game	Dionne	Tyger
10	Hook a Duck	Georgia	Georgia
11	Shooting Gallery	Cel	Cel
12	Ping Pong Target	Talia Francis	Tyger
13	Penalty Shoot-Out	All	Team
Series Winner(s)			Team (6 - 7)

=== Series 4 ===
Due to Drew-Honey not being in the studio for the first two episodes due to other commitments, Danny Pearson (then a guest presenter) took his place.

Week	Game	Tyger vs...	Winner
1	Dance	Dionne	Dionne
2	Ping Pong Maze	Cel	Cel
3	Balloon Popping	Dionne	Dionne
4	Christmas Tree Decorating	Talia	Talia
5	Christmas Cracker Pulling	Aidan	Tyger
Series Winner(s)			Team (4 - 1)

== Face Off ==
Face Off is a section in the show (introduced in the fifth series) where two of the presenting team go head-to-head in a 'face off' challenge. The loser has to wear a red shirt and stand in the 'danger' zone. The loser of the previous week gets to take on a different presenter the following week, with a chance of stepping out of the danger zone if they win the next challenge. The presenter who is wearing the red shirt at the end of the series has to face a forfeit.

=== Series 5 ===
Week	Presenter vs Presenter	Winner
1	Aidan vs Ceallach	Aidan
2	Ceallach vs Dionne	Ceallach
3	Dionne vs Shannon	Dionne
4	Shannon vs Danny	Shannon
5	Danny vs Richard	Danny
6	Richard vs Dionne	Richard
7	Dionne vs Ceallach	Ceallach
8	Dionne vs Danny	Danny
9	Dionne vs Shannon	Shannon
10	Dionne vs Aidan	Dionne
Series Loser		Aidan

=== Series 6 ===
Week	Presenter vs Presenter	Winner
1	Richard vs Shannon	Shannon
2	Richard vs Dionne	Dionne
3	Richard vs George	Richard
4	George vs Aidan	Aidan
5	George vs Shannon	George
6	Shannon vs Ceallach	Ceallach
7	Shannon vs Dionne	Shannon
8	Dionne vs Aidan	Dionne
9	Aidan vs George	Aidan
10	George vs Ceallach	George
11	Ceallach vs Shannon	Shannon
12	Ceallach vs George	Ceallach
13	George vs Shannon	Shannon
Series Loser		George

=== Christmas Download 2013 ===
Week	Presenter vs Presenter	Winner
Christmas Download	Aidan vs Dionne vs Shannon vs Richard vs Ceallach vs George	Aidan
Christmas Download Loser		Dionne, Shannon, Richard, Ceallach and George

=== Series 7 ===
Face Off presenters includes: Cel Spellman, Richard Wisker, Dionne Bromfield, Shannon Flynn, George Sear, Anaïs Gallagher, Harvey Cantwell, Connor Ball, Tinchy Stryder & Austin Mahone

Week	Guest	Safe Presenter	Loser	Forfeit
1	Connor	George	Dionne	Smelly Trainers
2	Harvey	Shannon	Harvey	Canteen Leftovers
3	Anaïs	Cel	Dionne	Maggots
4	Tinchy	Tinchy	Dionne	Samba Dance
5	Harvey	George	Harvey	Sucking a plate of Lemons
6	Anaïs	Anaïs	Dionne	Putting snails on the Face
7	Austin	Austin	George	Pouring Ice down the Back
8	Harvey and Anaïs	Anaïs	George	Canteen Leftovers 2

=== Series 8 ===
Face Off presenters includes: Cel Spellman, Shannon Flynn, George Sear, Richard Wisker, Molly Rainford, Anaïs Gallagher, Harvey Cantwell, Akai Osei, Leondre Devries, Charlie Lenehan, Kedar Williams-Sterling, Jordan Brown & Jake Roche

Week	Guest 1	Guest 2	Guest 3	Safe Presenter	Loser	Forfeit
1	Molly	Akai	—N/a	Akai	George	Jelly Eels
2	Akai	Leondre	—N/a	Shannon	Leondre	Raw Onion
3	Kedar	Jordan	—N/a	Kedar	George	Garlic Toothpaste
4	BBC RADIO 1 TEEN AWARDS					
5	Molly	Anaïs	—N/a	Ceallach	Anaïs	Walking on Dog Food
6	Anaïs	Harvey	Jake	Ceallach	Anaïs	Hands in curdled cottage cheese
7	Akai	Leondre	Charlie	Akai	Charlie	Socks on face
8	Molly	Akai	—N/a	Shannon	Richard	Leftovers in boots
9	Leondre	Charlie	—N/a	Charlie	Leondre	Worms On Face
10	Molly	Akai	—N/a	Molly	Akai	Jelly Eels, Raw Onion, Garlic Toothpaste, Walking on Dog Food and Leftovers in boots

Note: There is no face off in Week 4 due to a special Backstage Radio 1 Teen Awards episode.

=== Christmas Download 2014 ===
Team 1/Winners	Team 2/Losers	Forfeit
Ceallach; George; Harvey; Akai
Ceallach; George; Harvey; Akai	Richard; Shannon; Molly; Anaïs	
Ceallach; George; Harvey; Akai	Richard; Shannon; Molly; Anaïs	Singing "We Wish You A Merry Christmas" dressed as Christmas puddings

=== Series 9 ===
The presenters included Anaïs Gallagher and Harvey Cantwell (from series 7 and 8) and Molly Rainford, Akai Osei, Charlie Lenehan and Leondre Devries (from season 8).

== Production ==
Friday Download production as of 2014 is located at The London Studios in Studio 7. The show's production was originally based at BBC Television Centre from 2011 to 2013 and later BBC Elstree Centre in 2013.

== Awards and nominations ==
Year	Result	Award	Category	Ref.
2011	Nominated	Children's BAFTA	Best Entertainment	
2012	Won	Children's BAFTA	Best Entertainment	
