= List of House of Anubis episodes =

This article is an episode list for House of Anubis, a mystery/comedy-drama television series broadcast on Nickelodeon.

On March 10, 2011, Nickelodeon confirmed that it would make a second season of House of Anubis at its annual Upfront presentation to advertisers and media. On June 29, 2011, Entertainment Weekly came with the news that Nickelodeon had ordered a second season from production company Studio 100. They started shooting on July 21, 2011, in Liverpool.

Season 3 of House of Anubis was confirmed on April 16, 2012, the same day as the Nick UK Season 2 premiere. Filming for the third season began in July 2012. The third season premiered in the U.S. on January 3, 2013. The series has aired 76 episodes (160 segments). It became the first Nickelodeon series to reach over 100 episodes and not be a sitcom. The promo on Nickelodeon (UK and Ireland) was released on February 11, 2013 during the UK and Irish premiere of Dance Academy. It premiered in April 2013.

In Season 3, a major cast change occurred after the departure of Nathalia Ramos at the conclusion of the previous season and Ana Mulvoy-Ten, who left the series in Episode 10 of Season 3. Instead, two new actresses joined the cast – Alexandra Shipp and Louisa Connolly-Burnham.

A special episode of House of Anubis titled "Touchstone of Ra" aired on June 14, 2013 (UK) and June 17, 2013 (U.S.) as the conclusion of the series.

== Series overview ==
Season	Episodes		Originally released		
Season	Episodes		First released	Last released	Network
1	60		January 1, 2011	February 19, 2011	Nickelodeon
2	90		January 9, 2012	March 9, 2012	Nickelodeon
3	40	12	January 3, 2013	February 7, 2013	Nickelodeon
3	40	28	February 25, 2013	April 11, 2013	TeenNick
Special			June 14, 2013		TeenNick

== Episodes ==
=== Season 1 (2011) ===
- This season stars Nathalia Ramos as Nina Martin, Brad Kavanagh as Fabian Rutter, Jade Ramsey as Patricia Williamson, Ana Mulvoy-Ten as Amber Millington, Tasie Dhanraj as Mara Jaffray, Bobby Lockwood as Mick Campbell, Eugene Simon as Jerome Clarke, and Alex Sawyer as Alfie Lewis, and Klariza Clayton as Joy Mercer.
- This season was filmed from July 2010 to December 2010.
- Bobby Lockwood was absent for six episodes (18–19, 38–40, 47).
- Klariza Clayton was absent for 51 episodes (2–29, 35, 38–46, 48–57).
- Tasie Dhanraj was absent one episode (15).

No. overall	No. in season	Title	Directed by	Written by	Original release date
1	1	"House of Secrets"	Angelo Abela	Diane Whitley	January 1, 2011
2	2	"House of Attitude"	Angelo Abela	Diane Whitley	January 1, 2011
3	3	"House of the Black Bird"	Angelo Abela	Diane Whitley	January 1, 2011
4	4	"House of Dares"	Angelo Abela	Diane Whitley	January 1, 2011
5	5	"House of Lies"	Angelo Abela	Diane Whitley	January 1, 2011
Nina Martin, an American teenager, arrives at Anubis House, a residency at Amun Academic Boarding School – one of the United Kingdom's most selective and prestigious boarding schools – and finds it to be a mysterious and even foreboding place. She meets her roommate, Patricia, and tries her best to settle in. However, one of the most popular students, Joy, mysteriously disappears – leaving Nina in the firing line from her suspicious new roommate because Joy disappears the same day that Nina arrives. Patricia concentrates all her efforts on getting to the bottom of Joy's disappearance, with most of her investigations focused on Nina (even though several of her housemates, such as Fabian, say that Nina has nothing to do with Joy's disappearance). Nevertheless, Patricia's suspicions only deepen when a spooky message appears in the steam on the bathroom mirror simply saying "Help Me! – Joy"; however, this was proven to have been a prank later on in the premiere when she questions Alfie and he makes a false promise. Nina's new life becomes even more strange when she meets an unusual old lady on the school grounds who claims to have once lived at Anubis House. She gives Nina a locket and tells the latter that a treasure is hidden in the house, and she asks Nina to make sure that it does not fall into the wrong hands. Patricia quizzes Mr. Sweet, the school's headmaster, about Joy and gets nowhere. She then discovers that Joy has been erased from the school photograph. Amber becomes jealous when her roommate, Mara, helps her boyfriend Mick with his homework. Eventually, Amber flies into a rage after finding out Mick has given Mara a friendship bracelet (an exact copy of the one that the former had gotten from Mick "as a token of [their] love"). In an attempt to make Mick jealous, Amber kisses Alfie in front of him. While all this plays out, Patricia encourages the others to become involved in an initiation ceremony for Nina – the first part of which is to steal Victor's spare key to the attic. Nina quickly succeeds in this task and then goes up into the attic at midnight. Once she is inside, Patricia locks the door (against much opposition from her housemates – especially Fabian and Amber) and demands that Nina tell her everything she knows about Joy's disappearance. Nina reiterates that she knows absolutely nothing while crying in fear. Patricia refuses to believe her and leaves her in the attic for the night because by this time, Victor, the surly caretaker of Anubis House, catches them up past curfew and orders them back to bed. Victor goes up into the attic to see what the commotion is all about. Nina goes as far into the attic as she can in order to avoid Victor. Guest star(s): Francis Magee as Victor Rodenmaar Jr., Mina Anwar as Trudy Rehmann, Julia Deakin as Daphne Andrews, Paul Antony-Barber as Eric Sweet, Rita Davies as Sarah Frobisher-Smythe, and Jack Donnelly as Jason Winkler Absent: Klariza Clayton (2–5). First appearance of Nathalia Ramos as Nina Martin, Brad Kavanagh as Fabian Rutter, Jade Ramsey as Patricia Williamson, Ana Mulvoy-Ten as Amber Millington, Eugene Simon as Jerome Clarke, Alex Sawyer as Alfie Lewis, Klariza Clayton as Joy Mercer, Bobby Lockwood as Mick Campbell, Tasie Lawrence as Mara Jaffrey, Francis Magee as Victor Rodenmaar Jr., Mina Anwar as Trudy Rehmann, Julia Deakin as Daphne Andrews, Paul Antony-Barber as Eric Sweet, Rita Davies as Sarah Frobisher-Smythe, Jack Donnelly as Jason Winkler, and Brigid Zengeni as Mrs. Mulligan. Viewers (in millions): 2.6
6	6	"House of Locks"	Angelo Abela	Diane Whitley	January 2, 2011
7	7	"House of Eyes"	Angelo Abela	Diane Whitley	January 2, 2011
Fabian and Amber confront Patricia about allowing Nina to come out of the attic. However, Patricia has thrown the key out of the window into the bushes. While hiding from Victor, Nina accidentally opens a secret panel in the attic with her locket and sees a pair of mysterious eyes looking out at her, causing her to panic. In the end, she uses a hairpin to pick the lock and leave the attic. She successfully finishes her "initiation ceremony" and later confides in Fabian about the eyes. The next day, Fabian asks Nina to walk with him to school, and on the way there, they recover the key and Nina decides to keep it for future trips into the attic – "the only place where [she] truly felt welcome". In addition, Patricia listens in on a conversation in the staff room which reveals that something has happened to Joy – and the teachers are involved with the conspiracy. Patricia persuades Mara to help her steal Joy's file from Mr Sweet's office, instigating a bag search by Victor. Meanwhile, Jerome sets up a phony date between Alfie and Amber, in which Amber expects meet Mick. That night, Nina and Fabian sneak into the attic to discover the pair of eyes is actually a painting, with some Egyptian hieroglyphics on the back. When Nina mentions Sarah's promise of the treasure, they decide to speak to her again. Guest star(s): Francis Magee as Victor Rodenmaar Jr., Mina Anwar as Trudy Rehmann, Julia Deakin as Daphne Andrews, Paul Antony-Barber as Eric Sweet, Rita Davies as Sarah Frobisher-Smythe, and Jack Donnelly as Jason Winkler. Absent: Klariza Clayton
8	8	"House of Agendas"	Angelo Abela	Diane Whitley	January 2, 2011
9	9	"House of Keys"	Angelo Abela	Diane Whitley	January 2, 2011
Patricia reports Joy as a missing person to the police. After looking up the hieroglyphic symbols on the back of the old painting, Nina and Fabian conclude that the treasure is hidden underneath the eighth stair. There, they find the next clue – a key. Fabian makes Jerome reveal his plan to Mick and this makes it so that Amber and he are back together – at the expense of Alfie. Mick and Amber decide to have a getting-together party that night and invite everyone to attend. Guest star(s): Francis Magee as Victor Rodenmaar Jr., Mina Anwar as Trudy Rehmann, Julia Deakin as Daphne Andrews, Paul Antony-Barber as Eric Sweet, Rita Davies as Sarah Frobisher-Smythe, Jack Donnelly as Jason Winkler, and Nicholas Bailey as Sergeant Roebuck. Absent: Klariza Clayton
10	10	"House of Discovery"	Tom Poole	Diane Whitley	January 10, 2011
11	11	"House of Hyper"	Tom Poole	Diane Whitley	January 10, 2011
Victor rigs the attic door with a feather, and when Nina and Fabian sneak up to find some strange wax cylinders (during Mick and Amber's getting-together party), Victor knows that someone has been up there. Mara talks to Patricia in the girls' bathroom about her liking Mick, and unknowingly to the two of them, Amber hears the whole thing – eventually being fed up. Amber blows up with jealousy over Mara and Mick's friendship and demands to change rooms, sharing with Nina instead of Mara. Fabian and Nina take the wax cylinders to Fabian's uncle, Ade, who runs an antique shop and find out about the phonograph cylinders. Fabian remembers seeing an old phonograph in the attic. They resolve to return to the attic if they want to play the cylinders. Patricia overhears Victor talking to Sergeant Roebuck about Joy, and realizes the police are also involved in the conspiracy surrounding Joy's disappearance. Guest star(s): Francis Magee as Victor Rodenmaar Jr., Mina Anwar as Trudy Rehmann, Julia Deakin as Daphne Andrews, Paul Antony-Barber as Eric Sweet, Rita Davies as Sarah Frobisher-Smythe, Jack Donnelly as Jason Winkler, Nicholas Bailey as Sergeant Roebuck, and Simon Chandler as Ade Rutter. Absent: Klariza Clayton First appearance of Simon Chandler as Ade Rutter.
12	12	"House of Cheats"	Tom Poole	Diane Whitley	January 11, 2011
13	13	"House of Rumors"	Tom Poole	Diane Whitley	January 11, 2011
Mara cheats on Mick's French test for him, which Jerome sees, and he uses it to blackmail her into doing chores for him and Alfie. Nina and Fabian sneak back into the attic to listen to the cylinders, but it makes a loud screeching sound and they have to abandon their plans. Patricia sees a mysterious man hanging around on the school grounds and is freaked out, thinking it is a ghost. She confides in her drama teacher, Jason (Mr. Winkler), who says he'll help her solve the conspiracy surrounding Joy's disappearance. Amber catches Nina with the puzzle piece and forces her to tell all about the quest for Sarah's treasure. While Nina and Fabian visit the attic to listen to the cylinders, Amber sneaks into the attic and follows them. Guest star(s): Francis Magee as Victor Rodenmaar Jr., Mina Anwar as Trudy Rehmann, Julia Deakin as Daphne Andrews, Paul Antony-Barber as Eric Sweet, Jack Donnelly as Jason Winkler, and Roger Barclay as Rufus Zeno. Absent: Klariza Clayton First appearance of Roger Barclay as Rufus Zeno.
14	14	"House of Intruders"	Tom Poole	Diane Whitley	January 12, 2011
15	15	"House of Proof"	Tom Poole	Diane Whitley	January 12, 2011
Mick finds out Mara cheated for him and falls out with her. Amber discovers a secret message written behind the wallpaper – "Help me, Sarah Frobisher Smythe." Fabian, Nina, and Amber record the cylinders onto a Dictaphone. The young girl on the recordings mentions the murder of her parents. They suspect that the girl may be a young Sarah. Amber and Nina go to the nursing home to visit Sarah and confirm that she is, in fact, the girl from the recordings. Amber comes up with a name for their gang – "Sibuna" (Anubis backwards). They make it official with a ceremony by the woods. Afterwards, Fabian manages to open the puzzle piece, revealing a riddle. Meanwhile, Jason finds Joy's broken mobile phone at the school bins; he searches for more clues but finds nothing. Guest star(s): Francis Magee as Victor Rodenmaar Jr., Mina Anwar as Trudy Rehmann, Julia Deakin as Daphne Andrews, Rita Davies as Sarah Frobisher-Smythe, Jack Donnelly as Jason Winkler, Roger Barclay as Rufus Zeno, Nicholas Bailey as Sergeant Roebuck, and Catherine Bailey as Esther Robinson. Absent: Klariza Clayton and Tasie Dhanraj (15). First appearance of Catherine Bailey as Esther Robinson.
16	16	"House of Confrontation"	Tom Poole	Diane Whitley	January 13, 2011
17	17	"House of Alarms"	Tom Poole	Diane Whitley	January 13, 2011
Patricia meets her "ghost" again in the woods; however, this time they talk and he informs her that he is a private investigator by the name of Dr. Renee Zeldman and that he will help her find Joy. Mick rudely breaks up with Amber after she skips too many dates. Jason's investigations lead him to a meeting with Victor, and he emerges from the meeting as a changed man. After Alfie and Jerome record over the Dictaphone, Sibuna returns to the attic to re-record the cylinders, where Amber accidentally solves the first puzzle piece's riddle. Patricia meets with Dr. Zeldman in the woods to discuss his plans for finding Joy (where he reveals his real name is Rufus Zeno). He instructs her to look out for the Eye of Horus – the same symbol found on the locket that Sarah gave Nina. The gang manages to pick up the next puzzle piece when the midday sun reflects through a chandelier in the hallway of Anubis House and reveals a secret panel in the wall. Mick apologizes for being so rude to Amber; however, he says that they "are mates, not dates" – implying that he does not believe that the two should be together. Sibuna listens to more recordings and hears a voice which is unmistakably similar to Victor's. Guest star(s): Francis Magee as Victor Rodenmaar Jr., Mina Anwar as Trudy Rehmann, Julia Deakin as Daphne Andrews, Paul Antony-Barber as Eric Sweet, Jack Donnelly as Jason Winkler, Roger Barclay as Rufus Zeno, and Catherine Bailey as Esther Robinson. Absent: Klariza Clayton
18	18	"House of Flames"	Tom Poole	Diane Whitley	January 14, 2011
19	19	"House of Passages"	Tom Poole	Diane Whitley	January 14, 2011
Patricia spots Nina's necklace and recognizes it as the Eye of Horus and calls Rufus to inform him that she has seen the Eye of Horus. Sibuna opens the next puzzle piece to reveal the second riddle. They work out that it refers to a fireplace, so they begin to check every fireplace in the house. Meanwhile, down in the cellar, a strange ritual takes place involving Victor, the teachers, and a select few others. Mrs. Andrews confiscates Patricia's phone and find out that she is in contact with Rufus Zeno – a man known to the teachers as "The Betrayer". Sibuna manages to open the old stove in the kitchen with Nina's pendant, and it leads them down into the cellar where they find the next clue – an old tethering ring with a code on the inside. While inspecting it, Victor comes down. They manage to hide in an old cabinet, and from their hiding place see him drink a strange liquid as a toast to "life." Guest star(s): Francis Magee as Victor Rodenmaar Jr., Mina Anwar as Trudy Rehmann, Julia Deakin as Daphne Andrews, Paul Antony-Barber as Eric Sweet, Jack Donnelly as Jason Winkler, Nicholas Bailey as Sergeant Roebuck, Michael Lumsden as Frederick Mercer, and Sheri-An Davis as Nurse Delia. Absent: Klariza Clayton and Bobby Lockwood (18). First appearance of Michael Lumsden as Frederick Mercer and Sheri-An Davis as Nurse Delia.
20	20	"House of Kidnap"	Tom Poole	Diane Whitley	January 18, 2011
21	21	"House of Cat-Nap"	Tom Poole	Diane Whitley	January 18, 2011
Amber and Nina find a black cat which has escaped from the cellar. Amber pretends that she is sick and takes the day off school to look after it, but it disappears while she is asleep. Patricia persuades Nina to go and meet Rufus to show him the pendant. When they get to the meeting place, they witness Victor kidnapping an apparently unconscious Rufus, which makes them suspicious. Sibuna lets Patricia in on the secret, and debates the possibility that Victor might be drinking an elixir that gives him eternal life. They decide to use the school play to try to expose Victor's plot. After finding evidence of sinister experiments in the cellar, they turn to Trudy for help; she forces Victor to open the cellar only to reveal that he has moved everything. To the house's horror, Victor fires Trudy. Guest star(s): Francis Magee as Victor Rodenmaar Jr., Mina Anwar as Trudy Rehmann, Julia Deakin as Daphne Andrews, Paul Antony-Barber as Eric Sweet, Jack Donnelly as Jason Winkler, and Roger Barclay as Rufus Zeno. Absent: Klariza Clayton
22	22	"House of Cameras"	Tim Hopewell	Diane Whitley	January 19, 2011
23	23	"House of Numbers"	Tim Hopewell	Diane Whitley	January 19, 2011
With Trudy gone, Victor installs security cameras to spy on the kids. Mara challenges Mick to a sports quiz and defeats him. Having proved herself, she offers to help with his training program. Nina finds an article on Tutankhamen's treasure and the original owners of Anubis House, who were implicated in stealing something from his tomb that was never found. After pressure from Mick's father, Victor removes the cameras and reinstates Trudy. The next riddle leads Sibuna (which now includes Patricia) to look underneath the stairs for something "beleathered and clasped" and there they stumble across a couple of photographs of Victor from 1925 looking exactly the same as he does now. Guest star(s): Francis Magee as Victor Rodenmaar Jr., Mina Anwar as Trudy Rehmann, Julia Deakin as Daphne Andrews, Paul Antony-Barber as Eric Sweet, Catherine Bailey as Esther Robinson, and Stephen Beckett as Mr. Campbell. Absent: Klariza Clayton
24	24	"House of Scares"	Tim Hopewell	Diane Whitley	January 20, 2011
25	25	"House of Fakers"	Tim Hopewell	Diane Whitley	January 20, 2011
The security cameras are removed and Trudy returns to the house. Mick excels in training thanks to Mara and the two end up kissing. Sibuna returns to the cellar to find proof of the elixir, and come face to face with something terrifying – a pair of zombies. Alfie and Jerome admit that they were the "zombies" down in the cellar. Later they get into trouble with Jason for conning the younger years into paying to audition for the school play. Patricia hides the elixir sample they took from the cellar, while Nina visits Sarah, who informs her that she and Rufus used to play together as children. She also seems to suggest that Victor killed her parents. Mara overhears Mick saying that he could never see himself with Mara, upsetting the latter. Guest star(s): Francis Magee as Victor Rodenmaar Jr., Mina Anwar as Trudy Rehmann, Rita Davies as Sarah Frobisher-Smythe, and Jack Donnelly as Jason Winkler. Absent: Klariza Clayton
26	26	"House of Identity"	Tim Hopewell	Diane Whitley	January 21, 2011
27	27	"House of Emergency"	Tim Hopewell	Diane Whitley	January 21, 2011
Mara changes her appearance (and personality) to try to impress Mick and not be "boring". She also ruins Mick's sports gear by putting a red sock in the dryer with it. Alfie gets trapped in the cellar while going back to retrieve his zombie mask. Jerome is caught near the cellar by Victor and is sent to his room, unable to rescue Alfie. Later that night, Alfie witnesses something traumatic in the cellar. Jerome enlists Fabian's help to rescue the shaken and traumatized Alfie from the cellar. The next day Alfie hyperventilates while trying to remember what happened, and Nina accidentally gives him the elixir from the cellar to drink. He collapses and is hospitalized. Nina feels so guilty that she quits Sibuna, handing her locket to Fabian. Guest star(s): Francis Magee as Victor Rodenmaar Jr., Mina Anwar as Trudy Rehmann, Julia Deakin as Daphne Andrews, and Jack Donnelly as Jason Winkler. Absent: Klariza Clayton
28	28	"House of Reunion"	Tim Hopewell	Diane Whitley	January 24, 2011
29	29	"House of Memories"	Tim Hopewell	Diane Whitley	January 24, 2011
Victor announces that Alfie drank cleaning fluid. Nina tries to distance herself from Sibuna but still can't help solving the latest riddle, leading them to an old "beleathered and clasped" dictionary which can only be opened with her locket (which only works when Nina wields it). While visiting Alfie in hospital, Patricia finds Rufus in a catatonic state. Patricia rescues Rufus from the hospital and hides him in the woods. Later, Rufus meets the others and warns Nina to give the locket back to Sarah. The gang manages to read a secret message hidden in the dictionary which gives them their next clue. Unfortunately, while Nina and Fabian are cracking the clue, Victor catches them and forces them to hand over the next puzzle piece. Guest star(s): Francis Magee as Victor Rodenmaar Jr., Mina Anwar as Trudy Rehmann, Jack Donnelly] as Jason Winkler, Roger Barclay as Rufus Zeno, Catherine Bailey as Esther Robinson, and Sher-An Davis as Nurse Delia. Absent: Klariza Clayton (28).
30	30	"House of Drama"	Tim Hopewell	Diane Whitley	January 25, 2011
31	31	"House of Codes"	Tim Hopewell	Diane Whitley	January 25, 2011
A jealous Mara sends untruthfully incriminating pictures of Mick and his new training partner, Esther (the health and physical education teacher of the school), to Mr Sweet, forcing him to sack the innocent teacher. After reading a book given to them by Fabian's Uncle Ade, the gang works out they could be searching for the Cup of Ankh, and they plot to steal the puzzle piece from Victor's safe. During the opening scene of the school play, Patricia spots Joy in the audience. Patricia manages to decode her unusual good luck card – a secret message from Joy arranging to meet after the play. Whilst everyone is at the play, Nina attempts to break into Victor's safe to steal the puzzle piece back. She is scared when she hears Victor returning to the house before she can crack the code. Guest star(s): Francis Magee as Victor Rodenmaar Jr., Mina Anwar as Trudy Rehmann, Julia Deakin as Daphne Andrews, Paul Antony-Barber as Eric Sweet, Jack Donnelly as Jason Winkler, and Catherine Bailey as Esther Robinson.
32	32	"House of Risk"	Angelo Abela	Diane Whitley	January 26, 2011
33	33	"House of Thieves"	Angelo Abela	Diane Whitley	January 26, 2011
Nina successfully completes her mission, and finds another relic. She also overhears Victor saying he will "eliminate" someone in the audience. When she tells Patricia and Fabian this, Patricia thinks he is going to kill Joy; however, he actually meant Rufus. At the end of the play, Joy reveals herself accidentally, and Victor chases her. He finds her, referring to her as the "Chosen One". Patricia looks at her card, which says "Meet me tonight. Nine. Clearing in the woods. Joy." She meets Rufus there and he kidnaps her, making Nina think the battery on her phone is dead. Guest star(s): Francis Magee as Victor Rodenmaar Jr., Mina Anwar as Trudy Rehmann, Julia Deakin as Daphne Andrews, Paul Antony-Barber as Eric Sweet, Jack Donnelly as Jason Winkler, and Roger Barclay as Rufus Zeno. Absent: Klariza Clayton (33). Last appearance of Simon Chandler as Ade Rutter.
34	34	"House of Hazard"	Angelo Abela	Diane Whitley	January 27, 2011
35	35	"House of Charades"	Angelo Abela	Diane Whitley	January 27, 2011
Having kidnapped Patricia, Rufus attempts to blackmail Mr Sweet and Victor's followers – known as the Society of Ankh. Mara is worried, and she wants to talk about Mick breaking up, but Patricia seems to no longer be able to make time for Mara – especially since she joins Sibuna. Nina and Amber follow the clue on Joy's good luck card, spot Rufus's van in the clearing, and follow its oil leak to the warehouse where Patricia is being kept prisoner. When they go inside, they get tied up by Rufus. Guest star(s): Francis Magee as Victor Rodenmaar Jr., Mina Anwar as Trudy Rehmann, Julia Deakin as Daphne Andrews, Paul Antony-Barber as Eric Sweet, Jack Donnelly as Jason Winkler, and Roger Barclay as Rufus Zeno. Absent: Klariza Clayton
36	36	"House of Rendezvous"	Angelo Abela	Diane Whitley	January 31, 2011
36	37	"House of Rescue"	Angelo Abela	Diane Whitley	January 31, 2011
Mick and Mara make up. Mick leaves the house to win a sports scholarship. Fabian rescues Nina and Amber, and then Sibuna rescues Patricia with the help of Mrs. Andrews. Rufus escapes and is confirmed to be the society's antagonist. Nina, Amber, Fabian, and Patricia video chat with Joy when Victor says he'll give them "answers". Joy reveals that the teachers "are protecting her," and she went into hiding because Rufus is after her father. Before she hangs up, she informs Sibuna that they can trust the teachers. Guest star(s): Francis Magee as Victor Rodenmaar Jr., Mina Anwar as Trudy Rehmann, Julia Deakin as Daphne Andrews, Paul Antony-Barber as Eric Sweet, Jack Donnelly as Jason Winkler, Roger Barclay as Rufus Zeno, and Michael Lumsden as Frederick Mercer. Absent: Klariza Clayton (36)
38	38	"House of Arrest"	Angelo Abela	Diane Whitley	February 1, 2011
39	39	"House of Hoax"	Angelo Abela	Diane Whitley	February 1, 2011
Alfie gets his blood test results back from the hospital which Fabian and Nina read when they sneak into Victor's office. According to the report, the elixir was really just an herbal concoction. Mara and Jerome become closer and start to hang out more. Fabian loses a puzzle piece when he shoves his bag away when he thinks there will be a bag search. He eventually apologizes to Nina for losing the puzzle piece and seems to be in great despair: "I'm sorry! Look, I will not give up on Sarah, the quest, and certainly not on you [Nina]". Patricia has bad dreams about Rufus and pictures everyone in her class with his face. She runs out of class and has a small breakdown, eventually hiding in the laundry room. Alfie believes he got a message from aliens when he discovers the puzzle piece Fabian lost. Patricia and Alfie start to hang out so they can help each other avoid nightmares. Patricia steals the puzzle piece back from Alfie, and tells Fabian about it. Patricia leaves a note so Alfie thinks the aliens left, along with the artifact. Nina gets a clue from Sarah in a dream where Sarah tells her, "You're not giving up on me are you? Good, because it's just the beginning. 11 01 01 19 15. 11 01 01 19 15." Nina puts the numbers into the edge of a puzzle piece and the house suddenly starts to shake. Nina thinks that the house may be coming to life because Egyptians thought that all objects were alive. Guest star(s): Francis Magee as Victor Rodenmaar Jr., Mina Anwar as Trudy Rehmann, Julia Deakin as Daphne Andrews, Paul Antony-Barber as Eric Sweet, Rita Davies as Sarah Frobisher-Smythe, Jack Donnelly as Jason Winkler, and Roger Barclay as Rufus Zeno. Absent: Klariza Clayton and Bobby Lockwood
40	40	"House of Time"	Angelo Abela	Diane Whitley/Becky Simpson	February 2, 2011
41	41	"House of Aliens"	Angelo Abela	Diane Whitley/Becky Simpson	February 2, 2011
The contest for School Representative heats up, with Mara running. Jerome asks Mara out, but gets rejected when he starts insulting Mick. The latest riddle leads Sibuna to the grandfather clock, but when they open it, it is found to be empty, making it seem like someone has already taken the puzzle piece. Alfie is still fishing around so the gang tells him he was right all along about aliens. Then, during a Sibuna meeting, Nina opens the 5th puzzle piece and a secret message appears on the wall of the house itself. Alfie attacks Mrs. Andrews, believing her to be an alien, forcing Fabian and Patricia to tell him the truth about the puzzle pieces and their quest for the treasure and welcome him into Sibuna. Jerome helps Mara with her election campaign but Mick returns and asks Mara out, much to his chagrin. She accepts and they become an official couple. Nina goes to visit Sarah who tells her "you are me." In the attic she finds a picture of Victor, Rufus, and Sarah in 1960, implying that only Sarah has aged. Guest star(s): Francis Magee as Victor Rodenmaar Jr., Mina Anwar as Trudy Rehmann, Julia Deakin as Daphne Andrews, Paul Antony-Barber as Eric Sweet, Rita Davies as Sarah Frobisher-Smythe, Jack Donnelly as Jason Winkler, and Roger Barclay as Rufus Zeno. Absent: Klariza Clayton and Bobby Lockwood (40)
42	42	"House of Masks"	Angelo Abela	Diane Whitley	February 3, 2011
43	43	"House of Pursuit"	Angelo Abela	Diane Whitley	February 3, 2011
Amber decides to compete against Mara in the school elections. Mara begins focusing her attention on Mick – much to the frustration of Jerome. Sibuna decides to return to the cellar in order to collect a sample of the elixir, with Alfie insisting that he should go alone to prove himself. While down there, he has a terrifying flashback to the night he was trapped. Victor is suspicious when he discovers the gang were helped in their school play research by a woman called Sarah. He finds a clue in the signing out book which leads him to the nursing home and comes face to face with Sarah Frobisher-Smythe. Alfie tells the gang he remembered the teachers' spooky rituals from the cellar, and they discover the next clue hidden inside a fake phonograph cylinder in the attic. Guest star(s): Francis Magee as Victor Rodenmaar Jr., Mina Anwar as Trudy Rehmann, Julia Deakin as Daphne Andrews, Paul Antony-Barber as Eric Sweet, and Roger Barclay as Rufus Zeno. Absent: Klariza Clayton
44	44	"House of Yesterday"	Angelo Abela	Diane Whitley	February 4, 2011
45	45	"House of Victory"	Angelo Abela	Diane Whitley	February 4, 2011
Victor has Sarah stop by the house. When she sees him, she calls him a murderer, but then has various flashbacks from the past when she used to live in the house, including one in which she and Victor had been friends. Victor's father, Victor Rodenmaar, Sr. (who looks exactly like Victor) is portrayed to be cruel and unloving to his son, threatening to put him in the orphanage if he did not get the information that he wanted from Sarah. Meanwhile, Jerome shifts his allegiance to Amber's campaign. At the elections, Mick bribes the ballot chair Robbie with the opportunity to "hang out" more often as well as a date with Patricia to help Mara win the election. Sarah visits Nina in a dream again where she says, "I must go, it is your quest now." The next morning, Trudy informs Nina that the nursing home called to tell her that "Emily Grant" (Sarah's alias) had died that night, and that she left her a box of her possessions. She and the rest of Sibuna find legal documents that say that Rufus's parents were Sarah's guardians two years after her parents died, and that Rufus is Sarah's age, and has definitely taken the elixir. Guest star(s): Francis Magee as Victor Rodenmaar Jr., Mina Anwar as Trudy Rehmann, Julia Deakin as Daphne Andrews, Paul Antony-Barber as Eric Sweet, Rita Davies as Sarah Frobisher-Smythe, James Gandhi as Robbie, Brigid Zengeni as Mrs. Mulligan, Francis Magee as Victor Rodenmaar Sr., Emilia Jones as Young Sarah, Daniel O'Brien as Robert Frobisher-Smythe, and Helen Sheargold as Louisa Frobisher-Smythe. Absent: Klariza Clayton
46	46	"House of Bribes"	Tim Hopewell	Diane Whitley & Danny Spring	February 14, 2011
47	47	"House of Venom"	Tim Hopewell	Diane Whitley & Danny Spring	February 14, 2011
Mara is furious that Mick cheated for her to win the school election, as she expected to win fairly. Nina attends Sarah's funeral and then witnesses a confrontation between Rufus and Victor at the care home. She hears them mention Joy being the "Chosen One" before they realize that she has been eavesdropping. Victor tries to find out how much Nina knows, but she gives nothing away. Later, she leads an expedition down to the cellar where Sibuna witnesses a meeting of Victor's society. Meanwhile, Patricia calls Joy to find out if she knows more than she is saying. Guest star(s): Francis Magee as Victor Rodenmaar Jr., Mina Anwar as Trudy Rehmann, Julia Deakin as Daphne Andrews, Paul Antony-Barber as Eric Sweet, and Roger Barclay as Rufus Zeno. Absent: Klariza Clayton (46). Last appearance of Brigid Zengeni as Mrs. Mulligan.
48	48	"House of Stars"	Tim Hopewell	Diane Whitley & Danny Spring	February 15, 2011
49	49	"House of Harsh"	Tim Hopewell	Diane Whitley & Danny Spring	February 15, 2011
It is Nina's unlucky day when Victor padlocks the attic door to stop her going up there again. Victor even catches Nina doing something, which ruins everything. She does not even know the worst part yet – Jerome has contacted Rufus by getting Rufus's number off Patricia's phone and is now spying on Sibuna for Rufus after being bribed. Sibuna plan to go down into the cellar to collect some of the elixir and to try to crack the latest clue. Alfie draws the short straw, but this time he will have a walkie talkie to maintain radio contact. However, Jerome secretly sabotages the whole mission by taking Alfie's walkie talkie and tricking the Sibuna members. Alfie almost gets caught by Victor twice and manages to escape the second time by hiding in the sarcophagus. Jerome shuts and locks the sarcophagus with Alfie still inside. Guest star(s): Francis Magee as Victor Rodenmaar Jr., Mina Anwar as Trudy Rehmann, Julia Deakin as Daphne Andrews, Jack Donnelly as Jason Winkler, and Roger Barclay as Rufus Zeno. Absent: Klariza Clayton
50	50	"House of Lights"	Angelo Abela	Diane Whitley	February 16, 2011
51	51	"House of Allegiance"	Angelo Abela	Diane Whitley	February 16, 2011
Jerome poses as Alfie's savior after his failed cellar mission by reopening the sarcophagus. He demands that Alfie repay him by secretly passing him information on Sibuna. Nina works out that the next puzzle is inside the chandelier. Amber distracts Victor by pretending to faint so that Nina can get the relic. Mara and Mick finally kiss and make up. Alfie and Jerome fall out when Jerome accidentally reveals that he is working for Rufus. Fabian and Nina near the end of their search but still have one more place to look for the last puzzle piece, which is in the stuffed black crow in Victor's office. Written on the last puzzle piece is "END." Nina begins to hear voices and when she tells Fabian about it, he questions if she's truly the Chosen One, and not Joy. This scares Nina and she gets defensive about it. Guest star: Francis Magee as Victor Rodenmaar Jr. Absent: Klariza Clayton
52	52	"House of Pests"	Tim Hopewell	Diane Whitley & Danny Spring	February 17, 2011
53	53	"House of Betrayal"	Tim Hopewell	Diane Whitley & Danny Spring	February 17, 2011
Victor grows frustrated with Sibuna and concocts a scheme to put a stop to their quest. He secretly releases mice in the house to give him a reason to search the bedrooms. He searches and finds the elixir and some of the students' proof. He also finds the panel in the attic that conceals the picture of Sarah. While this goes on, the students must spend the night at the school. Under the guise of needing to place the order for a take-away dinner, Nina and Fabian lure Trudy and Mr. Sweet into his office and lock the door. Victor is forced to abandon his search of the house in order to go and let Trudy and Mr. Sweet out. Nina and Fabian sneak back to the house to take the other puzzle pieces before Victor gets to them. When Victor arrives at the school, he informs Mr. Sweet that his door was locked from the outside and wonders if Nina and Fabian had anything to do with it. Nina and Fabian make it out of the house just in time to escape being caught by Victor and run into the delivery boy outside the school, providing the perfect explanation for their disappearance. Nina then tells the other members of Sibuna that the remaining puzzle pieces must be carried with them at all times and to protect them with their life. Jerome catches Alfie with his puzzle piece and steals it to give to Rufus. Amber convinces Mara to petition the teachers into allowing an end of term prom. Guest star(s): Francis Magee as Victor Rodenmaar Jr., Mina Anwar as Trudy Rehmann, Julia Deakin as Daphne Andrews, and Paul Antony-Barber as Eric Sweet. Absent: Klariza Clayton Viewers (in millions): 2.841
54	54	"House of Revelation"	Tim Hopewiell	Diane Whitley & Danny Spring	February 18, 2011
55	55	"House of Heavy"	Tim Hopewiell	Diane Whitley & Danny Spring	February 18, 2011
Jerome gives Rufus Alfie's puzzle piece, much to the dismay of Alfie. Meanwhile, Fabian works out that the puzzle pieces may actually be the seven broken pieces of the Cup of Ankh. Sibuna plans to put the Cup together when Alfie admits to letting Jerome give the piece to Rufus. Jerome is scared of Rufus and agrees to get the piece back by trying to lock Rufus in the cellar. The plan backfires when Jerome has to go down with Rufus, instead of Rufus going down by himself. They call Victor like they had planned and he goes down to be surprised by Rufus who has drunk the elixir. Jerome manages to escape while they talk, but just as Nina is about to close the passageway, Rufus grabs her arm to stop her. Guest star(s): Francis Magee as Victor Rodenmaar Jr. and Roger Barclay as Rufus Zeno. Absent: Klariza Clayton
56	56	"House of Hush"	Tim Hopewell	Diane Whitley & Danny Spring	February 19, 2011
57	57	"House of Spies"	Tim Hopewell	Diane Whitley & Danny Spring	February 19, 2011
58	58	"House of Sting"	Tim Hopewell	Diane Whitley & Danny Spring	February 19, 2011
59	59	"House of Never"	Tim Hopewell	Diane Whitley & Danny Spring	February 19, 2011
60	60	"House of Forever"	Tim Hopewell	Diane Whitley & Danny Spring	February 19, 2011
Rufus escapes and Jerome asks Nina to protect him from Rufus. Amber receives her first invitation to the prom – a message on her profile from "King Tut". She reckons it is a boy with a thing about Egyptology and worries that this means Jason or even Fabian. She decides to let Fabian down easily when he says he hasn't asked anyone yet. Nina arrives and he gets nervous. Then Amber realizes "King Tut" is full of himself and thinks it is Jerome. Jerome makes a joke about it and embarrasses her in front of the house. Fabian asks Nina to the prom and she accepts. Meanwhile, Sibuna tries to assemble the Cup, but they find that it is not that simple. Thanks to Jerome, Nina and her friends realize that not only is there a Chosen Hour in which the Cup of Ankh must be assembled, but also a Chosen One (who they assume is Joy) the only person who can restore the Cup to its former shape and power. However, Victor knows this too, and the Chosen Hour is almost upon them. The night of the prom arrives, and Amber still doesn't have a dress or a date, until "King Tut" reveals himself to be Alfie, with a dress for her that was stolen by Jerome. However, prom is the least of Sibuna's worries as the teachers prepare for the Chosen Hour and Rufus springs his final trap. Joy is captured by her father, Victor, and the others in the Society of Ankh order her to assemble the Cup as the Chosen Hour arrives. Meanwhile, a gloating Rufus tells Nina and Sibuna that not even Victor knows the full consequences of drinking from the Cup of Immortality. Joy fails in her attempts to assemble the cup, and she realizes that she isn't the Chosen One. Meanwhile, Sibuna escapes Rufus and they make it back to the house. They find that Nina and Joy share the same birthday, but Joy says that her birthday was at 7PM while Nina was born at 7AM – the true seventh hour. They discover that Nina is the Chosen One and she reassembles the Cup, only to have it taken by Rufus, who returns. After Rufus drinks from it, he puts it in the fire and leaves. It turns out that Fabian switched the real elixir of life with a fake one and threw the real one away. Upon hearing this, Victor is devastated. The kids all leave to go to the prom, accepting that the quest is over. However, when Nina was about to leave the house, she hears Sarah's voice telling her to go back and that it is not over yet. Nina finds out the Cup is not destroyed after all. Sarah tells Nina to bury the Cup of Ankh and to make sure that no one finds it. After burying the Cup, she goes to the dance. Amber chooses the Prom King and Queen to be Fabian and Nina. Nina and Fabian dance and finally have their first kiss. Then the episode ends with the camera panning down to reveal the Cup of Ankh glowing buried underneath the stage. Guest star(s): Francis Magee as Victor Rodenmaar Jr., Mina Anwar as Trudy Rehmann, Julia Deakin as Daphne Andrews, Paul Antony-Barber as Eric Sweet, Jack Donnelly as Jason Winkler, Roger Barclay as Rufus Zeno, Catherine Bailey as Esther Robinson, Sheri-An Davis as Nurse Delia, and Michael Lumsden as Frederick Mercer. Viewers (in millions): 2.504 Last appearance of Jack Donnelly as Jason Winkler, Rita Davies as Sarah Frobisher-Smythe, Catherine Bailey as Esther Robinson, Sher-An Davis as Nurse Delia, and Michael Lumsden as Frederick Mercer.

=== Season 2 (2012) ===
- This season was filmed from July 2011 to January 2012.
- This season stars Nathalia Ramos as Nina, Brad Kavanagh as Fabian, Jade Ramsey as Patricia, Ana Mulvoy Ten as Amber, Eugene Simon as Jerome, Alex Sawyer as Alfie, Tasie Dhanraj as Mara, Bobby Lockwood as Mick, Klariza Clayton as Joy, and Burkely Duffield as Eddie.
- Burkely Duffield joins the main cast in episode 15. He was absent for 5 episodes. (35, 37–38, 55-56)
- Bobby Lockwood was absent for 73 episodes. (3, 22, 13–81, 84–86)
- Klariza Clayton was absent for 8 episodes. (9, 31–34, 53–54)
- Alex Sawyer was absent for 3 episodes. (19, 53–54)
- Eugene Simon was absent for 2 episodes. (55–56)
- Tasie Dhanraj was absent for 4 episodes. (3, 35, 41, 58)

No. overall	No. in season	Title	Directed by	Written by	Original release date
61	1	"House of Hello"	Tim Hopewell	Diane Whitley	January 7, 2012 (preview); January 9, 2012 (premiere)
62	2	"House of Dolls"	Tim Hopewell	Diane Whitley	January 7, 2012 (preview); January 9, 2012 (premiere)
The students return after the holidays. Jerome awkwardly tries to avoid a young girl. Amber is regretting agreeing to be Alfie's girlfriend. Sibuna has a midnight feast in the attic and are soon joined by the rest of the residents in Anubis House. Amber finds a dollhouse that is an exact replica of Anubis House. They get caught by Victor and everyone files down the stairs and back into their bedrooms. However, Nina is determined to look for a new hiding place for the Cup of Ankh, which everybody think was destroyed. Victor finds her as soon as she puts it into the secret door. He startles Nina, causing her to knock a box off the table. As Nina goes downstairs, she hears Victor pick up the old doll that she knocked over. It recites a riddle about a book of old, water of life, and tears of gold. She tells Fabian all about it and they agree to check out an abandoned library for the "book of old" that the riddle mentioned. When they do so later that day, they find Mr. Sweet and Victor already in there. They hide behind a bookshelf and hear them talking about the Book of Isis and where it might be hidden. Fabian knocks something off the shelf and the episode ends with Victor pulling the sheet off it, leaving him to find them. Guest star(s): Francis Magee as Victor Rodenmaar Jr., Mina Anwar as Trudy Rehmann, Julia Deakin as Daphne Andrews, Paul Antony-Barber as Eric Sweet, and Frances Encell as Poppy Clarke. First appearance of Frances Encell as Poppy Clarke. Viewers (in millions): 1.984
63	3	"House of Spirits"	Tim Hopewell	Diane Whitley	January 10, 2012
64	4	"House of Blackmail"	Tim Hopewell	Diane Whitley	January 10, 2012
Nina's grandmother comes to visit the house. A seventh grader blackmails Jerome. Alfie tries get Amber to be his girlfriend by giving her raspberry cupcakes, but Amber is allergic to raspberry and develops a blotchy face. Meanwhile, Nina has a dream inspired by Victor's riddle, which she has overheard. A malignant spirit emerges from the cup. It turns out Jerome's sister, Poppy, has been blackmailing him. Victor is convinced that he will find the Book of Isis in a traveling Egyptian artifacts exhibition. Nina hears some noises and goes up to the attic to examine. She takes the Cup out of its hiding place, and Senkhara comes out. The spirit tells Nina to find the Mask of Anubis before anyone else or forfeit her life. Trudy cleans out the attic to prepare a guest room and throws out the dollhouse. Alfie saves it to give to Amber, thus passing step one in Amber's dating book. Absent : Bobby Lockwood (3) and Tasie Dhanraj (3). Guest star(s): Francis Magee as Victor Rodenmaar Jr., Mina Anwar as Trudy Rehmann, Julia Deakin as Daphne Andrews, Paul Antony-Barber as Eric Sweet, Frances Encell as Poppy Clarke, Gwyneth Powell as Gran, and Sophiya Haque as Senkhara. First appearance of Gwyneth Powell as Evelyn Martin, Sophiya Haque as Senkhara, and Hugh Lee as Gustav Ziestack.
65	5	"House of Rivals"	Tim Hopewell	Diane Whitley	January 11, 2012
66	6	"House of Faces"	Tim Hopewell	Diane Whitley	January 11, 2012
Mara is upset that Mick's family is relocating to Australia. Alfie tries to impress Amber with one of his photos in a magazine cover and passes step two in Amber's dating book. Nina's Gran helps Fabian write a poem for Nina. When he goes to present it, Nina has something else on her mind. It is discovered that someone else might have found the path to the Mask of Anubis. There is a replica of the Mask of Anubis in the exhibition, so Nina and Fabian go check it out. Jerome's sister, Poppy, reads her father's letter to Jerome. Meanwhile, Fabian's attempt to read Nina his poem fails, and Nina has another terrifying dream. Guest star(s): Francis Magee as Victor Rodenmaar Jr., Mina Anwar as Trudy Rehmann, Julia Deakin as Daphne Andrews, Paul Antony-Barber as Eric Sweet, Frances Encell as Poppy Clarke, Gwyneth Powell as Gran, and Sophiya Haque as Senkhara.
67	7	"House of Myths"	Tim Hopewell	Diane Whitley	January 12, 2012
68	8	"House of Nightmares"	Tim Hopewell	Diane Whitley	January 12, 2012
Senkhara leaves her mark on Nina, and Fabian's godfather, Jasper, advises her about the mark and the Mask, which he believes to be a myth. Jerome finds Fabian's poem to Nina and steals it for part of another scheme. The dollhouse begins to communicate with Nina, and she thinks that the Mask is in the house. Nina starts to become jealous of Fabian and Joy spending time with each other. Alfie passes step three in Amber's dating book, and Amber tells him that they need to have a trial date before they are officially "together". Mara decides that she needs to make Mick break up with her so that he can go to a sports school in Australia. Mara takes Patricia's implicit advice and acts nerdy around him. The plan fails, making Mick like Mara even more than before. Later on, the dollhouse opens a hidden compartment to reveal a map. Poppy researches her father and discovers some interesting information. That night, Senkhara marks Fabian as well. Guest star(s): Francis Magee as Victor Rodenmaar Jr., Mina Anwar as Trudy Rehmann, Paul Antony-Barber as Eric Sweet, Frances Encell as Poppy Clarke, Gwyneth Powell as Gran, Sophiya Haque as Senkhara, and Sartaj Garewal as Jasper Choudhary. First appearance of Sartaj Garewal as Jasper Choundhary.
69	9	"House of Combinations"	Tim Hopewell	Diane Whitley	January 13, 2012
70	10	"House of Heartbreak"	Tim Hopewell	Diane Whitley	January 13, 2012
Fabian decides to keep the mark a secret from Nina. Nina believes that the mask his hidden under the house because she found the map in a compartment to the bottom of the doll house. As Fabian and Alfie set up a picnic for their double-date with Nina and Amber, respectively, Alfie keeps saying that he wants to give Amber the best so that she does not "put him on the bench". He then explains the concept of the "buddy bench" to Fabian. The date becomes a disaster when Alfie destroys the picnic with his tractor. When Nina and Fabian are in the cellar, Nina tries to discuss with Fabian how Amber keeps saying they were best friends before and still are, instead of being boyfriend and girlfriend. Fabian thinks Nina is trying to say that they should break up. The two mutually decide to break up. Amber saves Nina and Fabian from Victor when they are caught in the cellar. Mara finds tickets to Australia in Mick's locker and believes that Mick will break up with her and leave. She finds out later that Mick's dad had sent him the tickets as part of the bribe. To make his decision easy for him, Mara breaks up with him. Joy reads Fabian's poem since Jerome put it on her clipboard after finding it, and she believes that it is for her. As Joy hugs Fabian after what she thought was help in the opening speech, Nina sees the jackal mark on Fabian's arm. Because Fabian said that he did not have any mark to Nina earlier, she becomes mad at him. Amber agrees to be Alfie's girlfriend without posing any more tests. Meanwhile, Poppy sets out to look for her father alone when Jerome does not want to be involved in the investigation. Absent: Klariza Clayton (9) Guest star(s): Francis Magee as Victor Rodenmaar Jr., Mina Anwar as Trudy Rehmann, Paul Antony-Barber as Eric Sweet, Frances Encell as Poppy Clarke, Sophiya Haque as Senkhara, and Hugh Lee as Gustav Ziestack.
71	11	"House of Tunnels"	Peter Fearon	Tim Compton & Diane Whitley	January 16, 2012
72	12	"House of Goodbye"	Peter Fearon	Tim Compton & Diane Whitley	January 16, 2012
Sibuna finds an antechamber and several amulets. Mara is still upset about Mick while Jerome creates trouble between Mara and Mick. Mick prepares to leave for good. Everyone throws Mick a surprise party, but Mara decides not to go. Later, as Mick is leaving the house for good, Mara emotionally runs to him and they share a goodbye kiss. Jerome decides to hire a private investigator to find his father behind Poppy's back. Nina, Fabian, and Amber return to the antechamber to investigate further. Amber pulls a book and accidentally finds a tunnel behind the antechamber bookshelf by doing so. Guest star(s): Francis Magee as Victor Rodenmaar Jr., Mina Anwar as Trudy Rehmann, Frances Encell as Poppy Clarke, and Sophiya Haque as Senkhara.
73	13	"House of Protection"	Peter Fearon	Diane Whitley	January 17, 2012
74	14	"House of Letters"	Peter Fearon	Diane Whitley	January 17, 2012
Amber is temporarily blinded by a strange beacon that is apparently a trap. Nina and Fabian discover the only thing that can protect them from the beacon: the amulets. Nina and Fabian explore the first task, set by Sarah's father, Robert Frobisher-Smythe, in the tunnels. The answer lies in some old diaries, but one is missing. Jerome reads a letter to his mother from his father and makes a shocking discovery. As Trudy becomes Jasper's assistant for the exhibition, Anubis House is assigned a new housemother, Vera, and she appears to be more suspicious than anyone. Guest star(s): Francis Magee as Victor Rodenmaar Jr., Mina Anwar as Trudy Rehmann, Paul Antony-Barber as Eric Sweet, Frances Encell as Poppy Clarke, Sophiya Haque as Senkhara, Poppy Miller as Vera Devenish, and Colin Mace as Pete Roper, P.I. Absent: Bobby Lockwood First appearance of Poppy Miller as Vera Devenish.
75	15	"House of Who?"	Peter Fearon	Diane Whitley	January 18, 2012
76	16	"House of Frauds"	Peter Fearon	Diane Whitley	January 18, 2012
A new boy, Eddie, arrives and instantly makes an enemy in Patricia. Amber surprises Nina by finding something that Nina has been looking for. Jerome plans to scam money out of his classmates in order to hire a professional private investigator. Vera, the new house mother, and Jasper have a secret meeting. Eddie causes trouble at Jerome's fundraiser, and things become worse when Mara figures out that the entire fundraiser is a scam. That night, Senkhara invades Amber's dreams and attempts to mark her as well. Guest star(s): Francis Magee as Victor Rodenmaar Jr., Paul Antony-Barber as Eric Sweet, Frances Encell as Poppy Clarke, Sophiya Haque as Senkhara, and Poppy Miller as Vera Devenish. Absent: Bobby Lockwood First appearance of Burkely Duffield as Eddie Miller. Viewers (in millions): 2.199
77	17	"House of Chance"	Peter Fearon	Diane Whitley	January 19, 2012
78	18	"House of Divides"	Peter Fearon	Diane Whitley	January 19, 2012
Nina and Fabian puzzle over the mysterious cube that they have found in the tunnels, but accidentally leave it on Amber's bed. Continuing the Donkey Day activities, Eddie and Patricia and Amber and Alfie have their legs tied together. Amber and Alfie return to Anubis House to collect the Lucky Dip prizes as Vera discover the cube. Alfie mistakenly grabs it along with the other prizes, and Vera quickly snaps a picture of it for the Collector. The Collector informs Jasper to get the cube, but Poppy wins it before he is able. Soon, Jasper steals it for the Collector, his apparent patron, before Fabian convinces him to return it. Nina figures out how to make the mysterious cube into a key to unlock the first door in the tunnels and soon, Sibuna faces their next task: a deadly endeavor that involves potentially fatal traps. Guest star(s): Francis Magee as Victor Rodenmaar Jr., Paul Antony-Barber as Eric Sweet, Frances Encell as Poppy Clarke, Sophiya Haque as Senkhara, Sartaj Garewal as Jasper Choudhary, and Poppy Miller as Vera Devenish. Absent: Bobby Lockwood
79	19	"House of Crushes"	Peter Fearon	Bede Blake & Diane Whitley	January 20, 2012
80	20	"House of Vertigo"	Peter Fearon	Bede Blake & Diane Whitley	January 20, 2012
Sibuna's next task is a deadly Egyptian version of hopscotch. If the sequence is not correct on the first try, the ceiling descends to crush everything in its path and keep the Mask hidden from the world until the end of time. Meanwhile, Jerome is desperate to clear his debt after his charity scam fails and the P.I. turns up with nothing. He starts selling masks and dresses for the dance. Unfortunately, he sets himself up to be ostracized by selling Nina, Joy, and Mrs. Andrews the same dress. Thanks to Sarah's communication through the dollhouse, Sibuna figures out the correct sequence to safely cross the deadly hopscotch. Under Mr. Sweet's orders, Eddie and Patricia are forced to help Joy organize the grand opening ball. In a dream at the end, during the dance, Fabian and Nina share a kiss. Nina hears Senkhara calling and follows her down to the tunnels. The two proceed to argue before Senkhara pushes Nina off the edge and into the chasm. Guest star(s): Francis Magee as Victor Rodenmaar Jr., Frances Encell as Poppy Clarke, Sophiya Haque as Senkhara, Sartaj Garewal as Jasper Choudhary, and Poppy Miller as Vera Devenish. Absent: Bobby Lockwood and Alex Sawyer (19).
81	21	"House of Pressure"	Angelo Abela	Bede Blake & Diane Whitley	January 23, 2012
82	22	"House of Deja Vu"	Angelo Abela	Bede Blake & Diane Whitley	January 23, 2012
The day of the dance has arrived. Amber, Nina, and Fabian had the same dream involving Senkhara pushing Nina into the chasm the night before. Vera and Trudy have a bake-off during the dance. Mrs. Andrews finds a receipt near Vera's cake and suspects she may have bought it. Meanwhile, down in the tunnels, Amber, Nina, and Fabian attempt the deadly hopscotch challenge. The three complete the hopscotch challenge, but there is a bigger test to come. Eddie gets Patricia into trouble over the music and then saves the day before she can be expelled by Victor. Nina and Fabian are alarmed to see that their dream from the night before is coming true. Guest star(s): Francis Magee as Victor Rodenmaar Jr., Frances Encell as Poppy Clarke, Sophiya Haque as Senkhara, Sartaj Garewal as Jasper Choudhary, and Poppy Miller as Vera Devenish. Absent: Bobby Lockwood and Klariza Clayton (22).
83	23	"House of Hoods"	Angelo Abela	Bede Blake & Diane Whitley	January 24, 2012
84	24	"House of Deceit"	Angelo Abela	Bede Blake & Diane Whitley	January 24, 2012
The Collector intimidates Jasper into giving him the key to the exhibit, but Trudy finds out and becomes suspicious. The Collector creeps into the library to examine the exhibition, leading to a close shave for both Nina and Victor. Jerome and Alfie bet Eddie that he cannot convince Patricia to dance, and Eddie wins, causing Jerome to reap the consequences. Nina figures out how to cross the chasm, but when she runs to tell Fabian, she sees Joy kissing him. Upset, she flees to the tunnels while Jerome reads the letter that his father has sent to him and his sister from prison. Nina is angry with Fabian, but she shows him and Amber the crocodile beam, which they need to use to bridge the chasm. However, the quest becomes even more dangerous because Victor is now closer than ever to discovering the tunnels. Guest star(s): Francis Magee as Victor Rodenmaar Jr., Mina Anwar as Trudy Rehmann, Julia Deakin as Daphne Andrews, Paul Antony-Barber as Eric Sweet, Frances Encell as Poppy Clarke, Sartaj Garewal as Jasper Choudhary, and Hugh Lee as Gustav Ziestack. Absent: Bobby Lockwood
85	25	"House of Sibuna"	Angelo Abela	Bede Blake & Diane Whitley	January 25, 2012
86	26	"House of Payback"	Angelo Abela	Bede Blake & Diane Whitley	January 25, 2012
Amber proposes a Sibuna reunion in order to cross the chasm. Jerome finds out that his dad wants him to visit in prison. Patricia softens her attitude towards Eddie and then finds out about his bet. Joy and Mara sign up for the school website. Amber and Fabian enlist Patricia and Alfie to help them fit the bridge across the chasm, against Nina's best wishes. Sibuna practices laying the beam, and Victor finds the combination lock in the cellar. Alfie fails to dump Amber while Patricia plans her revenge on Eddie. Jerome and Mara visit his father while Sibuna encounters a new danger at the chasm – swinging pendulums. Guest star(s): Francis Magee as Victor Rodenmaar Jr., Frances Encell as Poppy Clarke, Sophiya Haque as Senkhara, Sartaj Garewal as Jasper Choudhary, and Philip Wright as John Clarke. Absent: Bobby Lockwood
87	27	"House of Pendulums"	Angelo Abela	Bede Blake & Diane Whitley	January 26, 2012
88	28	"House of Impasse"	Angelo Abela	Bede Blake & Diane Whitley	January 26, 2012
Victor and Vera hide in the cellar and see Sibuna exiting. Thus, the antechamber code is revealed. While Sibuna practices dodging pendulums, Patricia's revenge on Eddie backfires. As Sibuna enters the antechamber, they are shocked to find Victor standing there. Victor has been blinded by the beacon flash, though, and Sibuna only just manages to avoid him. Vera realizes that the amulets are needed to stop the beam. Poppy finds out that her father wants to arrange a prison visit and that Jerome did not tell her. Sibuna crosses the chasm but then reaches a dead end. Senkhara becomes angry at Nina and gives the mark to Amber, Patricia, and Alfie as well in vengeance. Vera is portrayed as being the Collector because the Collector sent the same message Vera sent to Jasper. Guest star(s): Francis Magee as Victor Rodenmaar Jr., Frances Encell as Poppy Clarke, Sophiya Haque as Senkhara, and Poppy Miller as Vera Devenish. Absent: Bobby Lockwood
89	29	"House of Help"	Angelo Abela	Bede Blake & Diane Whitley	January 27, 2012
90	30	"House of Phobias"	Angelo Abela	Bede Blake & Diane Whitley	January 27, 2012
Victor's sight returns in time for him to find an important passage on the Mask of Anubis. Jerome goes to visit his father, but he finds that Poppy has beaten him to it. Sibuna finds a crawl tunnel, and it is implied that it could that be the only way through to the next task. When Alfie enters it, it collapses, trapping him. Amber tries to rescue Alfie from the crawl tunnel; however, she fails, and Fabian has to save both of them. Later, Amber and Alfie break up. Victor spots the amulet around Amber's neck and confiscates all of the pupils' jewelry by invoking an obscure school rule. Now, the tunnels are his to explore without their interference. Guest star(s): Francis Magee as Victor Rodenmaar Jr., Frances Encell as Poppy Clarke, Sophiya Haque as Senkhara, and Poppy Miller as Vera Devenish. Absent: Bobby Lockwood
91	31	"House of Isis"	Gill Wilkinson	Paul Gerstenberger & Diane Whitley	January 30, 2012
92	32	"House of Curfews"	Gill Wilkinson	Paul Gerstenberger & Diane Whitley	January 30, 2012
Victor hits a dead end in the tunnels. When Victor returns from the tunnels, Vera gives the Book of Isis, which she had found in the desk located within Robert Frobisher-Smythe's study, to Victor. However, she steals the most important chapter from the book first. Sibuna tries to exhaust Victor by keeping him awake all night. He falls into a deep sleep so they can steal the amulets from him. Jerome looks for his father's gem but fails to locate it. While Nina and Fabian try to take the amulets off Victor, he nearly awakes from the sound of Nina cutting the amulets off him. Guest star(s): Francis Magee as Victor Rodenmaar Jr., Frances Encell as Poppy Clarke, Sophiya Haque as Senkhara, and Poppy Miller as Vera Devenish. Absent: Bobby Lockwood and Klariza Clayton Note: The episode House of Isis was called House of Barriers in the ending credits. Viewers (in millions): 2.127
93	33	"House of Dead-Ends"	Gill Wilkinson	Paul Gerstenberger & Diane Whitley	January 31, 2012
94	34	"House of Webs"	Gill Wilkinson	Paul Gerstenberger & Diane Whitley	January 31, 2012
Jerome informs Mara of his father's mission and tells her that his dad wants him to find a special gem in a suit of armor. When Nina enters the tunnel, she finds a lever and pulls it to open the next door in the tunnels. Back by the entrance, the wall folds in on itself and leads deeper into the tunnels. The kids arrive at their next challenge: a giant spider web. While searching the kids' rooms, Vera gets a hold of the extra amulet hidden in the dollhouse. While Nina, Fabian, Alfie, and Amber are down in the tunnels, Eddie and Patricia perform chores for Victor. Mara tells Jerome that the armor is located inside Mr. Sweet's office. Jerome inadvertently convinces Alfie to create a distraction to lure Mr. Sweet out of his office by letting a goose loose through the hallway. While searching for the gem, Jerome accidentally causes the armor to fall and hears Mr. Sweet coming back to his office. Guest star(s): Francis Magee as Victor Rodenmaar Jr., Mina Anwar as Trudy Rehmann, Frances Encell as Poppy Clarke, Sophiya Haque as Senkhara, and Poppy Miller as Vera Devenish. Absent: Bobby Lockwood and Klariza Clayton
95	35	"House of Fronts"	Gill Wilkinson	Paul Gerstenberger & Diane Whitley	February 1, 2012
96	36	"House of Keepers"	Gill Wilkinson	Paul Gerstenberger & Diane Whitley	February 1, 2012
Alfie's goose is led into Mr. Sweet's office, and it swallows the gem. Victor decides to forge a fake amulet so that when the kids look to find the extra amulet, they will not realize that he stole it. Trudy tells Mrs. Andrews her concerns about Vera. Eddie and Patricia run off to play American football, and Patricia loses her amulet. Joy asks Fabian to go on a date, but he does not give a definitive answer. Victor calls everyone inside to check the house after a suspicious pet food package arrives in the mail. Victor puts the fake amulet inside the dollhouse. Patricia realizes her amulet is missing and goes to look for it. While she has no luck, someone finds the amulet and takes it. Guest star(s): Francis Magee as Victor Rodenmaar Jr., Mina Anwar as Trudy Rehmann, Paul Antony-Barber as Eric Sweet, Sophiya Haque as Senkhara, and Poppy Miller as Vera Devenish. Absent: Bobby Lockwood, Burkely Duffield (35) and Tasie Dhanraj (35)
97	37	"House of Hacks"	Gill Wilkinson	Paul Gerstenberger & Diane Whitley	February 2, 2012
98	38	"House of Stings"	Gill Wilkinson	Paul Gerstenberger & Diane Whitley	February 2, 2012
Mrs. Andrews asks Mara to investigate Vera for a "profile" on the school website. Jerome is delighted when the goose passes the gem, until Mara drops it down the sink. Vera tries to "help" them locate it and steals it for herself, acting oblivious to its location. Patricia wears the fake amulet to the tunnels so the others aren't aware she lost hers, and she is blinded. The others go ahead into the tunnels without her. Patricia hears someone coming into the tunnels and blindly searches for Sibuna. As Sibuna explores the spider web task, Patricia arrives to warn them that someone is coming. As they hide, Victor reaches the web and is stung by the web. In an interview, Mr. Sweet tells Mara that Jasper was the one who secured Vera's job. Guest star(s): Francis Magee as Victor Rodenmaar Jr., Mina Anwar as Trudy Rehmann, Julia Deakin as Daphne Andrews, Paul Antony-Barber as Eric Sweet, Sartaj Garewal as Jasper Choudhary, and Poppy Miller as Vera Devenish. Absent: Bobby Lockwood and Burkely Duffield
99	39	"House of Double-Cross"	Gill Wilkinson	Paul Gerstenberger & Diane Whitley	February 3, 2012
100	40	"House of Wires"	Gill Wilkinson	Paul Gerstenberger & Diane Whitley	February 3, 2012
Jerome may have lost the gem, but he now has Patricia's amulet, thanks to Poppy. Nina and Fabian steal the gem from Vera's room and trade with Jerome to secure the amulet. Later, Nina sees a riddle in the dollhouse telling her to follow the "silver thread of fate." Jerome has the gem, but he faces another complication: the shield is missing. Meanwhile, Eddie overhears Patricia telling Joy that she likes him. Mara investigates Vera's room for information, but Vera comes inside and she threatens Mara who now fears Vera. Mara also stumbles upon the missing chapter of the Book of Isis, which then finds its way into Victor's hands. Sibuna discovers a sinister clue to the spider web task, including a new riddle and a giant lifelike spider. Guest star(s): Francis Magee as Victor Rodenmaar Jr., Frances Encell as Poppy Clarke, and Poppy Miller as Vera Devenish. Absent: Bobby Lockwood
101	41	"House of Envy"	Tim Hopewell	Paul Gerstenberger & Diane Whitley	February 6, 2012
102	42	"House of Names"	Tim Hopewell	Paul Gerstenberger & Diane Whitley	February 6, 2012
Victor is translating the Book of Isis, but it is not as easy as he had hoped. Eddie tries to get Patricia to admit that she likes him. Fabian and Joy go to a movie. Nina is hurt by Fabian's action and decides that they should go to the tunnels to solve the spider web task without Fabian, but it is a decision that she will regret after Alfie's life is put in danger. Eddie and Patricia misbehave in class, but only Patricia is punished, leading her to believe Eddie can get away with anything. Alfie and Jerome realize that, if Jerome wants the shield in which the gem belongs, he will have to win it back from a rival school. Meanwhile, Mara figures out that Vera's resume is all lies, and Nina learns Senkhara's name. Sibuna finally passes the spider web task, opening a door, which then starts to close. As it closes, Nina walks inside, knowing that this is the only chance she has to get closer to finding the mask. Guest star(s): Francis Magee as Victor Rodenmaar Jr., Mina Anwar as Trudy Rehmann, Paul Antony-Barber as Eric Sweet, Sophiya Haque as Senkhara, and Sartaj Garewal as Jasper Choudhary. Absent: Bobby Lockwood and Tasie Dhanraj (41).
103	43	"House of Evidence"	Tim Hopewell	Paul Gerstenberger & Diane Whitley	February 7, 2012
104	44	"House of Genius"	Tim Hopewell	Paul Gerstenberger & Diane Whitley	February 7, 2012
As Mara gathers evidence against Vera, Sibuna completes the web task after Fabian puts the larger spider in its place. They move on to the next task where they must follow the clues on the wall and pick the right liquids and pour them into six different tubes on a lion's head, which will free the glue stuck to the door into the next tunnel. Meanwhile, Victor realizes that the latest task is one that he can solve himself and takes the lead in the race for the mask. Jerome needs help to win back the Frobisher Shield, but he never expected for it to come from Amber, who has been a ping-pong champion in the past. Nina and Fabian see Victor with some chemicals and become suspicious. Patricia calls Eddie Mr Sweet's pet and best friend. After Patricia leaves, Eddie convinces Mara to upload her report exposing Vera publicly on the school website. Guest star(s): Francis Magee as Victor Rodenmaar Jr., Paul Antony-Barber as Eric Sweet, and Sophiya Haque as Senkhara. Absent: Bobby Lockwood
105	45	"House of Slander"	Tim Hopewell	Paul Gerstenberger & Diane Whitley	February 8, 2012
106	46	"House of Hasty"	Tim Hopewell	Paul Gerstenberger & Diane Whitley	February 8, 2012
Mara regrets her decision to post the article about Vera to the school website after being pressured by Eddie. Alfie is delighted when Jerome makes him ping pong coach. Vera is upset about Mara's article and convinces Victor to take action. Patricia's mocking causes Eddie to plan an epic prank on Mr. Sweet. In the tunnels, Victor completes the task and moves on to the next task. Senkhara becomes furious and causes Nina's mark to burn. Mara and Vera go head-to-head in a hearing to establish the truth of Mara's claims. Mara does not realize that her key witness is also Vera's. Fabian thinks that they have solved the potions task, but Nina is suspicious that Victor may have beaten them to it. Eddie's prank on Mr. Sweet backfires on Mara, and she is expelled. Guest star(s): Francis Magee as Victor Rodenmaar Jr., Mina Anwar as Trudy Rehmann, Julia Deakin as Daphne Andrews, Paul Antony-Barber as Eric Sweet, Sophiya Haque as Senkhara, and Poppy Miller as Vera Devenish. Absent: Bobby Lockwood
107	47	"House of Sorry"	Tim Hopewell	Diane Whitley	February 9, 2012
108	48	"House of Hex"	Tim Hopewell	Diane Whitley	February 9, 2012
A shocked Mara is expelled, while Jerome fires "Coach" Alfie. Vera has secretly bribed her witness – and Trudy is still suspicious. Mara doesn't get expelled but can no longer work for the website. Mrs. Andrews takes the punishment and leaves the school. Patricia learns a huge secret about Eddie and Nina gets some bad news about Gran... Jerome's tournament goes badly. As Victor is getting ahead, Senkhara is getting angrier. She yells at Nina for visiting Gran instead of working through the tunnels. Nina gets upset and says that Senkhara doesn't exist and walks through her. Senkhara then tells Nina her punishment "will be to punish." The next day, Nina's innocent words to her friends are twisted by Senkhara into hexes. Nina gets a vision about herself turning into Senkhara and the Sibuna gang is running away from her. Guest star(s): Francis Magee as Victor Rodenmaar Jr., Mina Anwar as Trudy Rehmann, Julia Deakin as Daphne Andrews, Paul Antony-Barber as Eric Sweet, Frances Encell as Poppy Clarke, Gwyneth Powell as Gran, Sophiya Haque as Senkhara, Sartaj Garewal as Jasper Choudhary, Poppy Miller as Vera Devenish, Oscar James as Mr. Hendry, and Oliver Biles as Giles Winner-Freston. Absent: Bobby Lockwood Last appearance of Julia Deakin as Daphne Andrews.
109	49	"House of Silence"	Tim Hopewell	Diane Whitley	February 10, 2012
110	50	"House of Warnings"	Tim Hopewell	Diane Whitley	February 10, 2012
Alfie accidentally reveals Jerome's opponents have used crooked balls and then helps him win the match. Victor explores the next task and is deafened by a powerful klaxon. Nina realizes that it's her words that have hexed her friends. Senkhara tells her the punishments will last until the next task is complete. Patricia loses her voice, Alfie turns into a little kid, Fabian loses his memory, and Amber is turning old. The Sibunas are alarmed to discover that Victor has his own amulet. Mrs. Andrews gets replaced by a teacher named Miss Valentine, who briefly taught Mick in Australia. Due to Fabian being hexed with memory loss, he calls Joy "Pam" which sends her running out in tears confirming her crush is indeed crushed. Eddie tries to speak to Patricia about his feelings for her, and Patricia confirms her feelings with a kiss while Joy walks in on them. Later, in the tunnels, Alfie plays on the horns, but he gets the tune wrong. The klaxon sounds again, but this time, the ceiling cracks and begins to collapse... Guest star(s): Francis Magee as Victor Rodenmaar Jr., Mina Anwar as Trudy Rehmann, Paul Antony-Barber as Eric Sweet, Sophiya Haque as Senkhara, and Sarah Paul as Miss Valentine. Absent: Bobby Lockwood First appearance of Sarah Paul as Miss Valentine.
111	51	"House of Status"	Angelo Abela	Neil Jones & Diane Whitley	February 13, 2012
112	52	"House of Laments"	Angelo Abela	Neil Jones & Diane Whitley	February 13, 2012
The dollhouse tells the Sibunas the tune for the task: an ancient Egyptian song called the Song of Hathor. But no one still alive has heard it... Meanwhile, Amber agrees to be the face of the school in a new commercial – despite aging in fast forward. Mara hears that Mick has a new girlfriend and decides to make him jealous by pretending to date Jerome. The Sibunas are shocked as Alfie's rejuvenation curse accelerates and turns him into a 7-year-old. Patricia gets stuck in the bathroom and accidentally stands Eddie up on their date. Nina finds out that Victor has some information about the Song of Hathor. Jerome's pretend relationship with Mara comes to an end. Victor and Vera hatch a plan to steal an exhibit from the Frobisher Library, which Fabian overhears them discussing. Guest star(s): Francis Magee as Victor Rodenmaar Jr., Mina Anwar as Trudy Rehmann, Paul Antony-Barber as Eric Sweet, and Sophiya Haque as Senkhara. Absent: Bobby Lockwood Note: Due to Alfie's curse from Senkhara, he was absent for over half the episode as he turned into a child.
113	53	"House of Heists"	Angelo Abela	Neil Jones & Diane Whitley	February 14, 2012
114	54	"House of Alibis"	Angelo Abela	Neil Jones & Diane Whitley	February 14, 2012
Fabian tries to tell Nina about Victor and Vera's plan but forgets. Vera steals the Ox Bell from the exhibition. She escapes without getting caught, but Vera's cardigan gets caught on glass and Trudy finds the piece of fabric. Later on, Fabian decides to go to the library and sees an object missing. Trudy finds him and thinks that he had stolen the object. Meanwhile, it's Jerome's turn to babysit Alfie while Nina is forced to ask Senkhara for help with the task and she plays the song to Nina. The Sibuna gang go down into the cellar and try the horns task again. It doesn't work. Fabian's memory loss leaves him unable to give Trudy an alibi. Then he finds his note predicting Vera's theft. Eddie is shocked when Patricia tells him she never kissed anyone before him. And just as Nina is getting over the speed at which Amber is aging, Alfie turns into a baby... Guest star(s): Francis Magee as Victor Rodenmaar Jr., Mina Anwar as Trudy Rehmann, Sophiya Haque as Senkhara, Poppy Miller as Vera Devenish, and Aaron Stewart as Young Alfie. Absent: Bobby Lockwood, Alex Sawyer, and Klariza Clayton.
115	55	"House of Oblivion"	Angelo Abela	Paul Gerstenberger & Diane Whitley	February 15, 2012
116	56	"House of Snoops"	Angelo Abela	Paul Gerstenberger & Diane Whitley	February 15, 2012
Fabian is now unable to remember his own name; he even forgets who Nina is. Vera plants the ox bell in his room, but hears Nina and Fabian coming so she hides in the closet. They find the ox bell and take it to the tunnels, completing the task, curing them all. But their celebrations are short lived as Victor and Vera hatch their plan, leaving Nina and her friends to walk into a trap. Victor and Vera's plan backfires, leaving the Sibunas to return the Ox Bell to the Library. Alfie, Fabian and Nina explore the next task tunnel and realize that if they finish this task, they'll find the mask. Senkhara tells Nina that she has done well but she must not disobey her. Patricia has to admit to her friends that she has been keeping a big secret about her twin sister, Piper. Upstairs, Trudy gets closer to the truth about Vera. Guest star(s): Francis Magee as Victor Rodenmaar Jr., Mina Anwar as Trudy Rehmann, Paul Antony-Barber as Eric Sweet, Sophiya Haque as Senkhara, Poppy Miller as Vera Devenish, and Nikita Ramsey as Piper Williamson. Absent: Bobby Lockwood, Eugene Simon and Burkely Duffield Notes: Jade Ramsey's twin sister, Nikita Ramsey stars as Piper Williamson. First appearance of Nikita Ramsey as Piper Williamson.
117	57	"House of Reflections"	Angelo Abela	Paul Gerstenberger & Diane Whitley	February 16, 2012
118	58	"House of Stooges"	Angelo Abela	Paul Gerstenberger & Diane Whitley	February 16, 2012
A riddle in the next task hints that it is the final chamber before they reach the Mask. The Sibunas need to find six mysterious reflectors. The dollhouse shows the dolls at Victor's office, so the Sibuna go and try to find a reflector...which they couldn't find. Eddie decides to kiss Patricia again, but actually kisses Piper instead! Victor overhears Nina and Fabian talking about the final task; he does have a reflector – his father's watch. Trudy has been kidnapped, but she leaves a strange note for Jasper. Piper (as Patricia) acts kind to Alfie, since she has a crush on him, making Alfie fall in love with Patricia not knowing that it's really Piper. Victor has the first of the reflectors and Nina and Amber work out that the next one is in Sarah's music box. Jerome is worried when Jasper starts to obsess over the Frobisher Gem. When Piper (as Patricia) is kind to Eddie, he starts to question his relationship with Patricia. Mr Sweet asks Eddie and Patricia to dinner. Strangely, Patricia accepts. She tells Piper to go as her and tells her that Mr. Sweet is Eddie's dad, which Joy overhears. Jasper takes the Frobisher Gem and hides behind the stage when he hears Jerome coming. Jerome realizes that the Gem is missing and tells Mr. Sweet. Meanwhile, Jasper places a fake gem back and hides. When Jerome comes back with Mr. Sweet, the gem is back and Jerome is determined to find out who had tried to steal it. Guest star(s): Francis Magee as Victor Rodenmaar Jr., Mina Anwar as Trudy Rehmann, Paul Antony-Barber as Eric Sweet, Sartaj Garewal as Jasper Choudhary, Poppy Miller as Vera Devenish, and Nikita Ramsey as Piper Williamson. Absent: Bobby Lockwood and Tasie Dhanraj (58).
119	59	"House of Zodiacs"	Angelo Abela	Tim Compton & Diane Whitley	February 17, 2012
120	60	"House of Reckoning"	Angelo Abela	Tim Compton & Diane Whitley	February 17, 2012
The race is on to find all of the reflectors and the clues lie in an incomplete Zodiac chart. Mr Sweet doesn't believe the gem has been stolen. Meanwhile, at the restaurant, Piper turns up posing as Patricia. Patricia decides to keep an eye on Piper. Sweet and Eddie are fooled, that is, until Eddie and his dad see both Piper AND Patricia standing next to each other. Nina realizes Victor has his own copy of the Zodiac but his is more complete! Amber makes a copy but Fabian can't decipher any of the symbols. Meanwhile, Jerome hacks Jasper's computer and proof that he is working for the Collector and then he finds a coded call for help from Trudy. Guest star(s): Francis Magee as Victor Rodenmaar Jr., Paul Antony-Barber as Eric Sweet, and Nikita Ramsey as Piper Williamson. Absent: Bobby Lockwood
121	61	"House of Trades"	Graeme Harper	Bede Blake & Diane Whitley	February 21, 2012
122	62	"House of Magic"	Graeme Harper	Bede Blake & Diane Whitley	February 21, 2012
Patricia feels that Piper is cramping her style. Eddie feels bad that he had kissed Piper accidentally, but Piper tells him it's best not to tell Patricia. Jerome learns from Jasper that Trudy has been kidnapped by the Collector and he will need to find a Frobisher-Smythe artifact to buy her back. Victor decides to invite Gustav for dinner and Alfie decides to volunteer for the entertainment by doing magic. The Sibunas discover a secret door in the task chamber but it will only open to a certain amulet, which happens to be Victor's. Alfie and Piper get closer, but an argument with Patricia makes Piper reconsider her future. Jerome's search for Frobisher heirlooms leads him to Nina and Amber's room, where he finds Sarah's dollhouse. Gustav comes for dinner, and Alfie does his trick by taking Victor's amulet and making it "disappear". After Alfie breaks the amulet into pieces, Victor decides that the real amulet is up his sleeves which leads to Alfie dropping the other piece of cloth from his sleeve. Guest star(s): Francis Magee as Victor Rodenmaar Jr., Paul Antony-Barber as Eric Sweet, Sophiya Haque as Senkhara, Sartaj Garewal as Jasper Choudhary, Poppy Miller as Vera Devenish, and Nikita Ramsey as Piper Williamson. Absent: Bobby Lockwood
123	63	"House of Tricks"	Graeme Harper	Bede Blake & Diane Whitley	February 22, 2012
124	64	"House of Whispers"	Graeme Harper	Bede Blake & Diane Whitley	February 22, 2012
The Sibunas are delighted when Alfie reveals Victor's amulet in one piece – all part of the trick. Nina realizes that someone had moved the dollhouse and decides to hide it. Piper says goodbye and gives Patricia her necklace. Eddie comes and sees Piper's necklace on Patricia and believes that she's Piper and tells "Piper" that he feels bad that he still didn't tell Patricia about their kiss. Patricia is devastated when Eddie lets slip that he kissed Piper. Jerome believes Vera has stolen the dollhouse and Nina and Fabian realize that Vera is after the Mask. Joy pairs Eddie up with Mara to do a story on the revamped school website. Victor and Vera realize Alfie has tricked them and that he has the real amulet. The Sibuna gang opens up the secret door using Victor's amulet, leading them to the library. Fabian overhears Jerome and Jasper plotting something in the library and starts to think that Jasper might be an enemy. Patricia talks to Eddie in Mr. Sweet's office and accidentally turns on the loud speaker; she mentions that Eddie is Mr. Sweet's son and the entire school hears her. Guest star(s): Francis Magee as Victor Rodenmaar Jr., Poppy Miller as Vera Devenish, and Nikita Ramsey as Piper Williamson. Absent: Bobby Lockwood
125	65	"House of Duplicity"	Graeme Harper	Bede Blake & Diane Whitley	February 23, 2012
126	66	"House of Hauntings"	Graeme Harper	Bede Blake & Diane Whitley	February 23, 2012
Eddie thinks that Patricia on purposely pressed turned the speaker on to get revenge on Eddie. The race is on between Victor and the Sibunas to find the missing falcon reflectors. Victor doesn't finds anything in Alfie's room. Jasper brushes Fabian off when he's confronted about his secret talks with Jerome and Fabian believes it. Nina finds another reflector in the kitchen: a goblet. Eddie's shocked when his article research reveals a video image of Senkhara. He shows Mara and they start a ghost hunt, setting up cameras in the house. It does little to ease Patricia's jealousy. Nina realizes that Sarah's doll is a falcon reflector, just as Jerome steals it for Jasper. Jasper accidentally tells Jerome where he's meeting the collector and Jerome decides to follow. Hiding, Jerome sees Vera and another man with her. The Collector doesn't want the doll and throws it on the ground but then, Jerome moves making a sound and Vera comes over and tries to see if Jasper had brought anyone with him. Guest star(s): Francis Magee as Victor Rodenmaar Jr., Sartaj Garewal as Jasper Choudhary, and Poppy Miller as Vera Devenish. Absent: Bobby Lockwood
127	67	"House of Collections"	Graeme Harper	Bede Blake & Diane Whitley	February 24, 2012
128	68	"House of Speculation"	Graeme Harper	Bede Blake & Diane Whitley	February 24, 2012
The Collector rejects Jasper's offering of Sarah's doll and Vera doesn't see Jerome. But then Vera realizes that Victor needs its glass eye – it could be the next reflector! The Sibunas find out that there's a reflector in a mosaic... that Trudy has throw out. Fabian learns from Joy that it's in the library and the Sibunas recover it. Amber forgets to lock up the dollhouse and Jerome gets his hands on it. The only thing is that he doesn't know that Eddie and Mara's camera had recorded the whole thing... The Sibunas find their third reflector in the library, but Fabian now knows Jasper has been lying to him. While getting out of the tunnels, Patricia sees Eddie and Mara together and yells... causing them to wake up. They quickly get a picture of their "ghost" (which happens to be Amber) during their cellar stake out. With photographic evidence and Mara's theory that their ghost is the "Unknown Ruler" (Senkhara), their story could destroy the Sibuna's secret mission! Nina realizes that the dollhouse is missing and Jerome gives the dollhouse to Jasper who calls the Collector about it. The Collector takes the dollhouse and doesn't bring Trudy back... getting angry, Jasper takes his hood off and Jerome is shocked to find out who the Collector is... Guest star(s): Francis Magee as Victor Rodenmaar Jr., Sophiya Haque as Senkhara, Sartaj Garewal as Jasper Choudhary, and Poppy Miller as Vera Devenish. Absent: Bobby Lockwood
129	69	"House of Sabotage"	Graeme Harper	Bede Blake & Diane Whitley	February 27, 2012
130	70	"House of Nine Lives"	Graeme Harper	Bede Blake & Diane Whitley	February 27, 2012
After Jasper rips off the Collector's hood, Jerome learns that Rufus is back! The Sibunas learn that Eddie had backup files on a USB drive, even though they tried to infect the picture files on his computer, so Nina dispatches her friends on different missions; Fabian has to try to convince Joy not to run the story, Patricia must apologize to Eddie, and Amber and Alfie must steal Eddie's camera. Jerome and Jasper follow Rufus and Jerome tells Jasper who he is, and they fall back. Vera finds another reflector; a piece of stained-glass from the window in her room; Joy agrees not to run the story, on the condition that Fabian kisses her, Nina overhears it and is dismayed until Fabian tells Joy he can't do it and reveals his true feelings for Nina, but Joy decides not to run the story anyway; Eddie reconciles with Patricia. Alfie and Amber steal Eddie's camera and learn that Jerome stole the dollhouse and the two confront him. He then reveals Rufus is alive and that he his blackmailing Jasper with the threat of harming Fabian and Vera is working for him and they find out she is a double-agent; the Sibunas and Jerome try to tell Victor this but he doesn't believe them. Amber and Patricia then overhear that Victor has three reflectors and Vera overhears that the Sibunas have the remaining three. Rufus then visits Trudy and interrogates her about the dollhouse, but when she doesn't give enough information, he tells her he no longer needs her, much to Trudy's dismay. Guest star(s): Francis Magee as Victor Rodenmaar Jr., Mina Anwar as Trudy Rehmann, Sartaj Garewal as Jasper Choudhary, Poppy Miller as Vera Devenish, and Roger Barclay as Rufus Zeno. Absent: Bobby Lockwood
131	71	"House of Forgeries"	Tim Hopewell	Alison Greenaway & Diane Whitley	February 28, 2012
132	72	"House of Hijack"	Tim Hopewell	Alison Greenaway & Diane Whitley	February 28, 2012
The kids persuade Jasper to offer Rufus the replica mask from the library while they rescue Trudy; however, Alfie and Nina have to take a test leaving Amber, Jerome, and Fabian to rescue Trudy. But they are locked in the barn by Vera and Patricia and Nina can't rescue them because Senkhara traps them wanting the two to focus on the quest for the mask. Alfie manages to rescue the kids but accidentally smashes the dollhouse and knocks Trudy unconscious who forgets everything about Vera and the Collector. Senkhara promises to help get the three reflectors back by slowing down Victor's progress. Joy misinterprets advice from Miss Valentine and decides to write a rude post about Nina on a blog by an anonymous blogger named "Jack Jackal"; Rufus meets with Vera and promises to share the power of the Mask of Anubis with her; Victor has a dream of Vera getting marked by Senkhara, but when she doesn't show up to make breakfast and Victor tries to find Vera, he makes a terrible discovery... Guest star(s): Francis Magee as Victor Rodenmaar Jr., Mina Anwar as Trudy Rehmann, Sophiya Haque as Senkhara, Sartaj Garewal as Jasper Choudhary, Poppy Miller as Vera Devenish, Roger Barclay as Rufus Zeno, and Sarah Paul as Miss Valentine. Absent: Bobby Lockwood
133	73	"House of Freeze"	Tim Hopewell	Alison Greenaway & Diane Whitley	February 29, 2012
134	74	"House of Timeout"	Tim Hopewell	Alison Greenaway & Diane Whitley	February 29, 2012
When a poisonous article about Nina appears on the school website, speculation is rife about the identity of the school's phantom blogger. In order to save Vera, Victor hatches a plan and leaves his reflectors in his office, knowing that Sibuna will snoop around and find them when he goes out. The gang succeeds in finding the objects, and Fabian also finds Victor's completed zodiac, along with a list of where he believes the remaining reflectors are. Alfie and Amber go into the attic to retrieve the reflector from the stained glass window but, unaware that Vera is still catatonic nearby (concealed beneath a blanket by Victor), they accidentally reveal the existence of the passage between the tunnels and the library. Meanwhile, Mara knows that Jack Jackal did not write the hateful blog on Nina, as she herself is Jack Jackal. After prodding Joy for information, Joy hesitantly admits that she wrote the blog. Vera now bears the mark of Anubis and the Sibunas have all the reflectors, but they run out of time and the reflector stands disappear. Fabian finds out that Joy wrote the article and gets mad. Gran's condition deteriorates and Fabian makes a horrific discovery at the hospital: Gran is the time piece and she has the mark of Anubis. Guest star(s): Francis Magee as Victor Rodenmaar Jr., Mina Anwar as Trudy Rehmann, Gwyneth Powell as Gran, Sophiya Haque as Senkhara, Sartaj Garewal as Jasper Choudhary, and Poppy Miller as Vera Devenish. Absent: Bobby Lockwood
135	75	"House of Reflectors"	Tim Hopewell	Diane Whitley	March 1, 2012
136	76	"House of Illusion"	Tim Hopewell	Diane Whitley	March 1, 2012
Joy tries to apologize to Nina, who is upset over Gran being cursed, but the gang isn't having it and they freeze Joy out. Sibuna realizes that in order to complete the task, they will have to borrow a "Sibuna temp" to hold the sixth reflector, so Patricia hatches a plan to bring a blindfolded Eddie into the tunnels under the pretense of a "date." Sibuna and the oblivious Eddie manage to complete the task and enter the final chamber. However, the Mask is nowhere to be found and Fabian determines that in order to pass on, they must play the ancient game of Senet. Jerome is suspicious of Jack Jackal's latest article about a father-son relationship, and confronts Joy about it. Joy allows Jerome to think that she wrote the article, and that she knows Jerome's personal information regarding his father because Mara told her. However, after a hurt Jerome confronts Mara about it, the truth is revealed. Mr. Sweet permits Mara to write for the blog once more and Jerome and Eddie reveal to all their classmates that Joy wrote the hateful article about Nina. Rufus discovers he has a phony mask and threatens Vera to get him the real one. Guest star(s): Francis Magee as Victor Rodenmaar Jr., Mina Anwar as Trudy Rehmann, Paul Antony-Barber as Eric Sweet, Sophiya Haque as Senkhara, Sartaj Garewal as Jasper Choudhary, Poppy Miller as Vera Devenish, and Roger Barclay as Rufus Zeno. Absent: Bobby Lockwood
137	77	"House of Dreams"	Tim Hopewell	Diane Whitley	March 2, 2012
138	78	"House of Pitfalls"	Tim Hopewell	Diane Whitley	March 2, 2012
The Sibunas realize they must play the ancient Egyptian game of Senet – and the stakes are high. Joy is still getting a hard time because of Mara, so when Mr Sweet tells her to enter Mara in the blog competition, Joy makes other plans. Trudy is having strange dreams. Victor and Vera secretly practice Senet in his office, while the Sibunas meet Jasper who tells them Rufus knows he's been tricked, and he does it soon after the Sibunas find the rules on a mismatched tile on the library floor. Jerome finally makes his move on Mara, only to discover she's still not over Mick. Down in the tunnels, disaster strikes when Nina moves to the wrong square and the floor gives way beneath her. Guest star(s): Francis Magee as Victor Rodenmaar Jr., Mina Anwar as Trudy Rehmann, Paul Antony-Barber as Eric Sweet, Sophiya Haque as Senkhara, Sartaj Garewal as Jasper Choudhary, and Poppy Miller as Vera Devenish. Absent: Bobby Lockwood
139	79	"House of Phantoms"	Tim Hopewell	Diane Whitley	March 5, 2012
140	80	"House of Surrender"	Tim Hopewell	Diane Whitley	March 5, 2012
The Sibunas are reeling at Nina's disappearance and must cover for her both at school and to a suspicious Victor and Vera at home, as well as keeping a furious Senkhara at bay. Joy enters her article into the contest, but Mara thinks that her article was entered. Eddie knows that Joy had lied to Mara and tells Jerome. Nina wakes to find herself in an underground cell, and she is not alone... A distressed Fabian goes to tell Mr Sweet everything, but then while Mr Sweet isn't in the office, he hears Nina calling from underneath realizing that Nina is still alive. Patricia tries to be more couple-y with boyfriend Eddie, which only serves to alarm him. Nina sees Victor Rodenmaar Sr.'s ghost. Under pressure, Fabian makes a wrong move at Senet and things look even worse for the Sibunas. Guest star(s): Francis Magee as Victor Rodenmaar Jr., Mina Anwar as Trudy Rehmann, Paul Antony-Barber as Eric Sweet, Sophiya Haque as Senkhara, Poppy Miller as Vera Devenish, and Francis Magee as Victor Rodenmaar Sr.
141	81	"House of Strategy"	Angelo Abela	Diane Whitley	March 6, 2012
142	82	"House of Memory"	Angelo Abela	Diane Whitley	March 6, 2012
Alfie manages to escape the falls thanks to Patricia. Eddie and Jerome reveal that Joy didn't submit Mara's article to the web competition. The gang are left shaken after Alfie's near miss and Fabian recruits Joy as strategist – they've got to win this game somehow. Nina learns that every chosen one has a special champion to protect her. Trudy calls a doctor to help her get her memory back, but a desperate Vera decides to intervene by canceling Trudy's real appointment and asking someone to pretend to be her doctor. Fabian sees Victor playing Senet. Alfie and Amber decide to spy on her and the doctor and find out that the "doctor" placed fake memories into Trudy's head and that Vera wants to do the same to Sibuna. Meanwhile, Joy tries to get to grips with the Senet Task at the library when a secret man who was Trudy's doctor visits Jasper and takes off his mask... Guest star(s): Francis Magee as Victor Rodenmaar Jr., Mina Anwar as Trudy Rehamnn, Sophiya Haque as Senkhara, Poppy Miller as Vera Devenish, and Roger Barclay as Rufus Zeno.
143	83	"House of Pretenders"	Angelo Abela	Diane Whitley	March 7, 2012
144	84	"House of Trouble"	Angelo Abela	Diane Whitley	March 7, 2012
Joy realises that Trudy's doctor was Rufus. Vera follows the doctor's instructions to try to control the Sibunas, not knowing that they are playing along in order to find out how much Victor knows about Senet. But their plan fails when there's trouble in store for Alfie, and Victor... Jerome knows he's in trouble when he runs into Rufus sneaking around Anubis house. Alfie falls through the floor and meets up with Nina. Rufus kidnaps Jerome and no one knows where he is. Victor is horrified at losing Alfie on the Senet board and blames Vera for suggesting they use the students as pawns. Amber thinks her and Alfie should get back together again. Senkhara hunts for the Osirian, visiting both Eddie and Fabian in the night. Guest star(s): Francis Magee as Victor Rodenmaar Jr., Mina Anwar as Trudy Rehmann, Frances Encell as Poppy Clarke, Sophiya Haque as Senkhara, Poppy Miller as Vera Devenish, and Roger Barclay as Rufus Zeno.
145	85	"House of Traps"	Angelo Abela	Diane Whitley	March 8, 2012
146	86	"House of Stakes"	Angelo Abela	Diane Whitley	March 8, 2012
Eddie and Fabian have the same weird dream. Victor Sr. tells Nina to beware Senkhara and leaves for good. Mara wins blogger of the year, but is becoming too concerned about Jerome's disappearance to celebrate. Eddie is frustrated about Patricia's secret Sibuna life and disaster strikes the gang when Fabian and Joy disagree over how to finish the Task. He will need to if they are to finish the Task. Meanwhile, Eddie remembers the name of Jerome's "uncle" – but he doesn't understand why Patricia is so alarmed. Victor is beginning to wonder if the kids were right about Vera and he makes a shocking discovery in her room. Senkhara is getting upset that Joy and Fabian had chosen to save Nina and her friends instead of the key to the mask. Guest star(s): Francis Magee as Victor Rodenmaar Jr., Mina Anwar as Trudy Rehmann, Frances Encell as Poppy Clarke, Sophiya Haque as Senkhara, Poppy Miller as Vera Devenish, and Francis Magee as Victor Rodenmaar Sr. Absent: Bobby Lockwood Last appearance of Francis Magee as Victor Rodenmaar Sr.
147	87	"House of Missions"	Angelo Abela	Diane Whitley	March 9, 2012
148	88	"House of Captives"	Angelo Abela	Diane Whitley	March 9, 2012
149	89	"House of The Chosen"	Angelo Abela	Diane Whitley	March 9, 2012
150	90	"House of Freedom"	Angelo Abela	Diane Whitley	March 9, 2012
Eddie helps Mara to see how much Jerome means to her. Mick has come to visit to talk things out, making Mara very anxious because of her newfound and complicated relationship with Jerome. Meanwhile, Victor confronts Vera and Patricia tells the Sibunas that Rufus has taken Jerome. Fabian, Patricia and Alfie go to rescue him, while Amber, Nina, and Joy try to find a spare key to the Mask in the Frobisher library. Eddie gets himself into big trouble after following the Sibuna's to the barn and Fabian, Patricia and Alfie find out what Rufus really wants the Mask for; to go into the afterlife as a God. Sibuna learns the terrible truth of Senkhara's plan; if Nina wears the mask, Senkhara will take her body and become a Goddess, leaving both of them to live and rule in the afterlife forever. The rush begins and it's a race against time to get the mask and to warn Nina of what will happen. Guest star(s): Francis Magee as Victor Rodenmaar Jr., Mina Anwar as Trudy Rehmann, Paul Antony-Barber as Eric Sweet, Frances Encell as Poppy Clarke, Gwyneth Powell as Gran, Sophiya Haque as Senkhara, Hugh Lee as Gustav Ziestack, Sartaj Garewal as Jasper Choudhary, Poppy Miller as Vera Devenish, Philip Wright as John Clarke, and Sarah Paul as Miss Valentine. Last appearance of: Roger Barclay as Rufus Zeno, Nathalia Ramos as Nina Martin, Gwyneth Powell as Evelyn Martin, Sophiya Haque as Senkhara, Frances Encell as Poppy Clarke, Poppy Miller as Vera Devenish, Sartaj Garwel as Jasper Choudhary, Sarah Paul as Miss Valentine, and Bobby Lockwood as Mick Campbell.

=== Season 3: The Reawakening (2013) ===
- This season is subtitled The Reawakening.
- The season stars Brad Kavanagh as Fabian, Jade Ramsey as Patricia, Ana Mulvoy Ten as Amber episodes (1–10), Eugene Simon as Jerome, Alex Sawyer as Alfie, Tasie Lawrence as Mara, Klariza Clayton as Joy, Burkely Duffield as Eddie, Alexandra Shipp as KT, and Louisa Connolly-Burnham as Willow.
- Nathalia Ramos and Bobby Lockwood did not return to the series.
- Episodes are now 23 minutes each. (The first twelve episodes were aired over 6 weeks on Nickelodeon in an hour form, meaning 2 episodes aired on Nick every Thursday).
- The season was filmed from July 2012 through late January/early February 2013.
- There were 40 episodes in the season, adding up to a series total of 190 episodes.
- Susy Kane joined the cast this season as Caroline Denby, a new teacher who lives in the gatehouse.
- Tasie Dhanraj is now credited by her stage name Tasie Lawrence in the opening credits.
- Ana Mulvoy Ten leaves cast and doesn't appear in 30 episodes. (11–40)
- Francis Magee as Victor has been present in all episodes.
- Louisa Connolly-Burnham as Willow was absent for 2 episode (5,10).

No. overall	No. in season	Title	Directed by	Written by	Original release date
Nickelodeon
151	1	"House of Arrivals"	Angelo Abela	Diane Whitley	January 3, 2013 (Nickelodeon); February 18, 2013 (TeenNick)
152	2	"House of Presents"	Angelo Abela	Diane Whitley	January 3, 2013 (Nickelodeon); February 18, 2013 (TeenNick)
A new girl named KT begins school, and Eddie recalls seeing her in a vision where her grandfather gives her a key. A new teacher, Miss Denby, arrives and settles into the gatehouse, possessing a similar key to KT's . Fabian is upset that Nina is not returning to Anubis House, and he and Patricia later find Nina's locket amongst Eddie's things. Amber thinks KT is taking Nina's place and is upset by this. Victor is searching for an important parcel and Eddie is curious about KT. It's Amber's birthday and everyone forgets. Guest star(s): Francis Magee as Victor Rodenmaar Jr., Mina Anwar as Trudy Rehmann, Paul Antony-Barber as Eric Sweet, Susy Kane as Caroline Denby, and Geoffrey Burton as KT's grandfather. First appearance of Alexandra Shipp as KT Rush, Louisa Connolly-Burnham as Willow Jenks, and Susy Kane as Caroline Denby. Viewers (in millions): 1.711
153	3	"House of Truth"	Angelo Abela	Neil Jones	January 10, 2013 (Nickelodeon); February 18, 2013 (TeenNick)
154	4	"House of Hieroglyphs"	Angelo Abela	Neil Jones	January 10, 2013 (Nickelodeon); February 18, 2013 (TeenNick)
Eddie and KT try to find out what her mysterious key is for, and Alfie reveals to Amber that Victor is the owner of the bracelet, while Victor is frantically searching for it. Eddie and KT discover that Miss Denby also has a mysterious key. Guest star(s): Francis Magee as Victor Rodenmaar Jr., Mina Anwar as Trudy Rehmann, Paul Antony-Barber as Eric Sweet, and Susy Kane as Caroline Denby. Viewers (in millions): 1.728
155	5	"House of Revelation"	Angelo Abela	Neil Jones and Nathan Cockerill	January 17, 2013 (Nickelodeon); February 18, 2013 (TeenNick)
156	6	"House of Questions"	Angelo Abela	Neil Jones and Nathan Cockerill	January 17, 2013 (Nickelodeon); February 18, 2013 (TeenNick)
Alfie has the courage to tell Amber that she is accepted to fashion school. Fabian decodes some of the message from the bracelet packaging, while Eddie and KT foolishly sneak into Miss Denby's house and investigate a mysterious cabinet. Patricia and Fabian begin to suspect KT of working for Victor because of the mysterious key she has. Jerome and Mara take the business studies competition very seriously. Guest star(s): Francis Magee as Victor Rodenmaar Jr., Mina Anwar as Trudy Rehmann, Paul Antony-Barber as Eric Sweet, and Susy Kane as Caroline Denby. Absent: Louisa Connolly-Burnham as Willow (5) Viewers (in millions): 1.478
157	7	"House of Pi"	Angelo Abela	Nathan Cockerill	January 24, 2013 (Nickelodeon); February 19, 2013 (TeenNick)
158	8	"House of Mistrust"	Angelo Abela	Nathan Cockerill	January 24, 2013 (Nickelodeon); February 19, 2013 (TeenNick)
Eddie makes a shocking discovery about his dad. He finds out about how he belongs to the secret society with Victor and Ms. Denby. Fabian translates more of the message from the envelope. The clues point towards the Gatehouse, but their decision to investigate places Amber in great danger as she is trapped upstairs when Miss Denby, Victor and Mr Sweet unexpectedly arrive. When they go into the secret room, Amber follows and is accidentally locked in. As Fabian, Patricia and Alfie search for Amber, KT and Eddie's suspicions about Miss Denby are confirmed. Jerome's sabotage of Mara's business project backfires when he accidentally get sick from eating all her snacks and Amber learns the adults are planning a mysterious ceremony to bring back or revive the ancient son of Anubis himself. Joy reveals her true feelings about him to Fabian but Fabian turns her down and Joy quits Sibuna so she does not have to be around him all the time. Guest star(s): Francis Magee as Victor Rodenmaar Jr., Mina Anwar as Trudy Rehmann, Paul Antony-Barber as Eric Sweet, Susy Kane as Caroline Denby, and Charles Daish as Mr. Millington. Viewers (in millions): 1.422
159	9	"House of Trickery"	Angelo Abela	Nathan Cockerill	January 31, 2013 (Nickelodeon); February 19, 2013 (TeenNick)
160	10	"House of Unity"	Angelo Abela	Nathan Cockerill	January 31, 2013 (Nickelodeon); February 19, 2013 (TeenNick)
Amber is discovered in the tank room, and fakes memory loss so she doesn't have to explain why she was up there. Miss Denby calls in Victor, and he realizes that Amber has the parcel. After Victor threatens to make Amber's friends "disappear", Amber gives Victor the parcel. When Fabian, Patricia and Alfie spot Victor, Miss Denby and Mr Sweet taking Amber into Mr Sweet's office, they eavesdrop and mistakenly think that Amber has betrayed them. That very same evening, Victor announces to the shocked residents of Anubis House that Amber has left for fashion school and will not be coming back. Fabian, Patricia, Alfie, Eddie and KT all then receive a message from an unknown number to meet at the school. When they go, Amber is waiting, and explains that she gave Victor a fake parcel with one of Patricia's bracelets and some of KT's fortune cookie messages. She also tells them about what she overheard in the tank room, about the ceremony and tells them to reunite Sibuna with Fabian as leader. Fabian refuses, and says that Eddie should be leader as he is the Osirian. Later, Sibuna meet and explain everything they have found out to each other, including that Eddie and KT found a website giving backgrounds on people, that showed a photo of Miss Denby – their Miss Denby is a fake. Fabian accidentally lets slip that Patricia took KT's key, and KT pushes him into the tank, which begins to fall over. Absent: Louisa Connolly-Burnham as Willow (10) Guest star(s): Francis Magee as Victor Rodenmaar Jr., Mina Anwar as Trudy Rehmann, Paul Antony-Barber as Eric Sweet, Susy Kane as Caroline Denby, and Charles Daish as Mr. Millington. Viewers (in millions): 1.316 Last appearance of: Ana Mulvoy Ten as Amber Millington.
161	11	"House of Entrapment"	Angelo Abela	Diane Whitley	February 7, 2013 (Nickelodeon); February 19, 2013 (TeenNick)
162	12	"House of Sisters"	Angelo Abela	Diane Whitley	February 7, 2013 (Nickelodeon); February 19, 2013 (TeenNick)
The Sibunas discover the identity of the man in the tank as Robert Frobisher-Smythe. Jerome attempts to win Mara back. The Sibunas find the real Harriet Denby and discover that there Denby is actually her sister Caroline Denby. Joy boosts her confidence with a brand new look. The Sibunas learn only those pure of heart may awaken Frobisher good, he would be awaken evil is someone wasn't pure of heart. KT learns she is Frobisher's Great-Grand-Daughter. Harriet Denby was the original keeper until Caroline was adopted. Eddie ask Harriet Denby to escape with him but she refuses. He sees Caroline has arrived and it ends with Eddie wondering what he's going to do to avoid Caroline. Guest star(s): Francis Magee as Victor Rodenmaar Jr., Mina Anwar as Trudy Rehmann, Paul Antony-Barber as Eric Sweet, Susy Kane as Caroline Denby, and Bryony Afferson as Harriet Denby. Note: This is the last episode to air on Nickelodeon. Viewers (in millions): 1.362
TeenNick
163	13	"House of Tombs"	Angelo Abela	Diane Whitley	February 25, 2013
Caroline Denby walks into her sister Harriet's room. Eddie is hidden under Harriet's bed, and Harriet is asleep. Caroline looks around the room, suspicious. As she is about to look under the bed, Harriet wakes up, screaming. Caroline leaves, flustered. Caroline warns Eddie she will be keeping a very special eye on him. Fabian comforts KT about her anxiety of supposedly being Robert Frobisher-Smythe's great-granddaughter. Fabian assures her he just had a wife and daughter. But after a second look, it appears Robert married twice, and had a son who was born the same day as KT's grandfather. KT tells Sibuna, and expects them to get mad at her, but Eddie and Alfie are cool with it. The Sibunas go into the doorway in the tunnels, while Victor, Sweet, and Denby listen to music from the cylinders in Victor's office. The doorway opens, revealing Frobisher's crypt. Eddie recognizes it from a vision. The Sibunas are trapped in the crypt! Alfie is in the tunnels, and finds the doorway. Eddie gives him KT's key through the grate. Alfie opens it, making it possible to escape. Victor, Denby, and Sweet are talking about the final "riddle", 'The greatest treasure is worn with pride', which they think refers to the bracelet. The Sibunas go to the antechamber. Denby suggests team evil practices the ceremony on Corbierre. Eddie finds the book of the dead, and reveals a clue. Someone circled symbols of the tomb, which are words to the ceremony. When Sibuna arrive at the hospital, Harriet has disappeared, apparently with a family member as revealed by the attendant who also gives them an envelope. When Denby is finishing their practice ceremony, she glances at the bracelet and notices it says made in China, and furiously tells Victor he's been tricked. Guest star(s): Francis Magee as Victor Rodenmaar Jr., Mina Anwar as Trudy Rehmann, Paul Antony-Barber as Eric Sweet, Susy Kane as Caroline Denby, and Bryony Afferson as Harriet Denby.
164	14	"House of Smuggling"	Angelo Abela	Diane Whitley	February 26, 2013
Mr. Sweet recruits Joy for the School Open Day for prospective parents by agreeing to do something she could "really, really" use his help with. Sibuna read a card telling them to perform the ceremony since they are pure in their hearts. Mara and Willow plan to perform in the open day by reciting a poem or song, both hinting it's for Jerome. Concerned about the bracelet Eddie goes to the school at night and hides the bracelet behind a curtain under a podium containing an award, Sweet walks in and demands to see what he did but Eddie lies saying it is his father's birthday gift. Patricia is working at the Open Day so at least one of them is there. After the Sibunas make sure Denby is gone, they go and Fabian makes a break through with the symbols. Fabian explains his epiphany and tells them they need to wait until night, they agree but are unsure of how to do it. Joy begins Open Day and Jerome faces the looming prospect of Mara and Willow realizing the truth. Alfie presses a button and reveals an elevator that they will use to transport Frobisher Smythe. Patricia realizes that a welcoming committee will be out soon and when Eddie confirms they are within eyesight and that Denby, Sweet, and Victor will see them any minute. Mara and Willow assure Jerome their tribute to him will be good. Trudy finds Sibuna and jokingly asks whats under the tarp they covered the tank with. With no reply she says "You don't need to keep secrets from Trudy" and reaches for the tarp. Eddie forces her hand away and she looks concerned. Suddenly serious she says, "Eddie. Okay now I'm concerned. You're not going anywhere till you tell me WHAT is under here. What is under here?" Jerome and Willow kiss. Guest star(s): Francis Magee as Victor Rodenmaar Jr., Mina Anwar as Trudy Rehmann, Paul Antony-Barber as Eric Sweet, and Susy Kane as Caroline Denby.
165	15	"House of Anticipation"	Angelo Abela	Diane Whitley	February 27, 2013
Sibuna make it to the crypt and begin the ceremony. Willow is moved into Anubis House thanks to Joy. Denby discovers Frobisher is gone and suspects that Sibuna have him. Guest star(s): Francis Magee as Victor Rodenmaar Jr., Mina Anwar as Trudy Rehmann, Paul Antony-Barber as Eric Sweet, and Susy Kane as Caroline Denby.
166	16	"House of Close Calls"	Angelo Abela	Diane Whitley	February 28, 2013
The Sibunas fail to wake Frobisher and are trapped in the crypt with the adults on the warpath. Patricia hatches a rescue plan, including a false fire alarm. Jerome sweats as roommates Mara and Willow get closer. Guest star(s): Francis Magee as Victor Rodenmaar Jr., Mina Anwar as Trudy Rehmann, Paul Antony-Barber as Eric Sweet, and Susy Kane as Caroline Denby.
167	17	"House of Hustle"	Angelo Abela	Diane Whitley	March 4, 2013
Victor confiscates KT's key and when Jerome begs Patricia for a favour she strikes a deal – He has to get the key back from Victor! The Sibunas discover that the adults have special plans for the eclipse. Guest star(s): Francis Magee as Victor Rodenmaar Jr., Mina Anwar as Trudy Rehmann, Paul Antony-Barber as Eric Sweet, and Susy Kane as Caroline Denby.
168	18	"House of Set-Up"	Angelo Abela	Diane Whitley	March 5, 2013
Victor is furiously searching for the bracelet. After overhearing a conversation between the Sibunas, Mr. Sweet learns that Eddie has the bracelet. Mr. Sweet plans to steal the real ceremonial bracelet by setting-up Eddie. Jerome worries that if Mara and Willow keep being roommates it will threaten his secret. Eddie goes to Mr. Sweet's office to find more about KT but finds something else instead. Eddie comes back to Anubis House with Jerome's, Joy's, Alfie's, & Patricia's files. In the files they learn that KT isn't the descendant but Jerome, Joy, Alfie, and Patricia are. Realizing this, they rush to the Gatehouse to warn them but they are too late. Guest star(s): Francis Magee as Victor Rodenmaar Jr., Mina Anwar as Trudy Rehmann, Paul Antony-Barber as Eric Sweet, and Susy Kane as Caroline Denby.
169	19	"House of History"	Tracey Rooney	Diane Whitley	March 6, 2013
KT, Fabian and Eddie find out more about Frobisher's history. Joy, Jerome, Alfie and Patricia are locked in the gatehouse and it is revealed that they are the descendants needed for the ceremony and not KT. KT, Fabian and Eddie must get them out of the gatehouse, so they come up with a plan to kidnap the adults so that they can't perform the ceremony, but KT gets captured by Miss Denby who locks her in a closet. Meanwhile, at the gatehouse, Joy finds out Jerome's secret and e-mails Willow and Mara to tell them. Guest star(s): Francis Magee as Victor Rodenmaar Jr., Mina Anwar as Trudy Rehmann, Paul Antony-Barber as Eric Sweet, and Susy Kane as Caroline Denby. Note: This episode is also known as "House of Signals".
170	20	"House of Eclipse"	Tracey Rooney	Diane Whitley	March 7, 2013
The remaining Sibunas attempt to capture the adults to prevent the ceremony from happening but they fail. Joy finally understands the real reason of their visit to the Gatehouse. When the adults prepare to begin the ceremony, Joy and the others refuse but are forced when Victor arrives. Jerome tries to escape to keep his secret a secret from Mara and Willow. Meanwhile, Mara and Willow have a brief seminar before the eclipse. The ceremony begins along with the eclipse. The remaining Sibunas try to find a way into the Gatehouse with the help of KT's key. Eddie and KT go up to stop the ceremony. Eddie grabbed at the bracelet and threw it into the elevator. KT pushes the button to move the elevator. Fabian gets the bracelet and sees the eclipse is over. Guest star(s): Francis Magee as Victor Rodenmaar Jr., Mina Anwar as Trudy Rehmann, Paul Antony-Barber as Eric Sweet, and Susy Kane as Caroline Denby. Note: This episode was originally titled "House of Captures".
171	21	"House of Awakening"	Tim Hopewell	James Whitehouse and Hannah George	March 11, 2013
Frobisher finally wakes up and as the Sibunas predicted, he's evil. Caroline is the first one to find him. He forces her to do everything he tells her to do, and she agrees. At the school, Mr. Sweet expels the Sibunas, but then lifts their expulsion after he realizes they could report everything to the school governors. That night, Frobisher performs a ritual for an evil underground Egyptian god. Eddie hears Frobisher doing the ritual in his dreams, and wakes up screaming "no". Meanwhile, Joy, Mara and Willow plot revenge on Jerome. Guest star(s): Francis Magee as Victor Rodenmaar Jr., Mina Anwar as Trudy Rehmann, Paul Antony-Barber as Eric Sweet, Susy Kane as Caroline Denby, and John Sackville as Robert Frobisher-Smythe.
172	22	"House of Sarcophagi"	Tim Hopewell	James Whitehouse and Hannah George	March 12, 2013
After having a vision involving Frobisher, Eddie has a bad feeling something terrible is about to occur. At the gatehouse, Frobisher gives Caroline a mission: to find five sinning people to sacrifice to the evil Egyptian god he was performing a ritual to the night before. She instantly chooses to sacrifice the Sibunas, but the only problem is capturing them. Meanwhile, Joy, Mara and Willow come up with a plan to get back at Jerome. Guest star(s): Francis Magee as Victor Rodenmaar Jr., Mina Anwar as Trudy Rehmann, Paul Antony-Barber as Eric Sweet, Susy Kane as Caroline Denby, John Sackville as Robert Frobisher-Smythe, and Bryony Afferson as Harriet Denby.
173	23	"House of Possession"	Tim Hopewell	James Whitehouse and Hannah George	March 13, 2013
Jerome, Joy, Patricia and Alfie start acting very strangely, as if possessed by an unseen force. First, they start chanting something in their sleep and the next day in art class they all end up drawing the same thing. The Sibunas gets detention for "copying". Jerome is tricked into being selected for a singing competition. Eddie and KT go to find out more about Jerome, Joy, Patricia, and Alfie's behavior. Victor realizes Denby took the Book of Incantations. KT goes to the Gatehouse looking for answers but may get more than she hoped for... Guest star(s): Francis Magee as Victor Rodenmaar Jr., Mina Anwar as Trudy Rehmann, Paul Antony-Barber as Eric Sweet, Susy Kane as Caroline Denby, John Sackville as Robert Frobisher-Smythe, and Bryony Afferson as Harriet Denby.
174	24	"House of Greed"	Tim Hopewell	James Whitehouse and Hannah George	March 14, 2013
The Sibunas discover Frobisher in his crypt (where Caroline put him to trick the Sibunas) and think he is dead, but Eddie notices that he is breathing. KT thinks that Eddie is lying and is still convinced that Frobisher is dead, and she is very sad and broken up. Later, KT finds out that Patricia still likes Eddie and she gets KT to find out if he still likes her. After a misunderstanding, Eddie thinks that KT likes him. Later, Victor finds Frobisher at the gatehouse with Caroline and he finds out Caroline's true identity. He then tells Frobisher about Caroline, but Frobisher locks him in a sarcophagi, making Victor the first sinner of greed, with four more to go. Guest star(s): Francis Magee as Victor Rodenmaar Jr., Mina Anwar as Trudy Rehmann, Paul Antony-Barber as Eric Sweet, Susy Kane as Caroline Denby, and John Sackville as Robert Frobisher-Smythe.
175	25	"House of Deceptions"	Tim Hopewell	James Whitehouse and Hannah George	March 18, 2013
Frobisher makes Victor evil and keeps his sinning soul in the sarcophagi. He tells Victor to go find four more sinners, and he starts to consider picking Eddie as one of them since he is the leader of Sibuna. The Sibunas find another clue, and Victor sees them as they uncover it. Later, Patricia and Eddie agree to meet somewhere and make up, but the adults trick them and trap Eddie in Frobisher's tomb. Guest star(s): Francis Magee as Victor Rodenmaar Jr., Mina Anwar as Trudy Rehmann, Paul Antony-Barber as Eric Sweet, Susy Kane as Caroline Denby, and John Sackville as Robert Frobisher-Smythe.
176	26	"House of Rainbows"	Tessa Hoffe	Bede Blake	March 19, 2013
Joy agrees to Mara's plan to flirt, date, and break Jerome's heart, but she has some difficulties; Mara learns she is next in line to inherit a Lord's estate, making Jerome jealous that he has lost an opportunity to be rich; Eddie escapes the crypt after having a vision of Patricia being kidnapped by Denby, Frobisher, and Victor; Eddie goes to the school to find Patricia. Patricia yells at Eddie for standing her up, and confused Eddie fights back, but then kisses her to shut her up. Eddie apologizes, and Patricia forgives him. They are now back together! Eddie tells Patricia and Fabian that they cannot let Patricia out of their sights. Fabian helps KT work on the capsule by blocking out her senses. The episode ends with KT opening the capsule, and fading to black. Guest star(s): Francis Magee as Victor Rodenmaar Jr., Mina Anwar as Trudy Rehmann, Paul Antony-Barber as Eric Sweet, Susy Kane as Caroline Denby, and John Sackville as Robert Frobisher-Smythe.
177	27	"House of Enemies"	Tessa Hoffe	Bede Blake	March 20, 2013
Continuing from where it left off, KT opens the capsule and find a map and a riddle. Sibuna believes that Frobisher had a backup plan in case he woke up evil. Sibuna is required to do extra work for Miss Denby. Her and Victor used a fake test to test their personalities. Denby continues to mess with Eddie and Patricia. Eddie's archenemy, Benji, comes to visit and is staying at Isis House. Benji is said to have everything Eddie has including his girlfriend. Mara has a meeting with a lawyer and she learns she has inherited a dog. Eddie learns that there is a secret room in the cellar. Sibuna work on getting into the secret room. Guest star(s): Francis Magee as Victor Rodenmaar Jr., Mina Anwar as Trudy Rehmann, Paul Antony-Barber as Eric Sweet, Susy Kane as Caroline Denby, John Sackville as Robert Frobisher-Smythe, and Freddie Boath as Benji. First appearance of Freddie Boath as Ben Reed. Note: This episode is also known as "House of History" or "House of Signals", but "House of History" was the title given to a previous episode in this season.
178	28	"House of Surprise"	Tessa Hoffe	Bede Blake	March 21, 2013
Joy starts to question going through with Mara's plan to hurt Jerome. Victor discovers the secret room the Sibunas have discovered. Robert tells him to set a booby trap that can take someones life; Miss Denby continues to meddle by making Patricia and Ben partners in trust exercise. Eddie becomes very jealous. On Eddie and Patricia's surprise date, Patricia becomes jealous when Eddie takes a call, and thinks it was KT, but really it was his mom; Jerome asks Joy on a date, and she says yes. Willow becomes suspicious of Alfie's activities with the Sibunas. Guest star(s): Francis Magee as Victor Rodenmaar Jr., Mina Anwar as Trudy Rehmann, Paul Antony-Barber as Eric Sweet, Susy Kane as Caroline Denby, John Sackville as Robert Frobisher-Smythe, and Freddie Boath as Benji.
179	29	"House of Winning"	Tessa Hoffe	Bede Blake	March 25, 2013
Eddie continues to make sure they win the dodgeball tournament. During the tournament, KT leaves hoping to find a better way into the secret room. With KT gone, Eddie must rely on Fabian who helps them win the tournament. While KT is at Anubis House she encounters Harriet Denby, who locks her in a closet. Afterwards, Harriet encounters Mr. Sweet and is taken back to Caroline. KT finds a more accessible way into the secret room, which is underneath her. KT falls through the floor and is knocked out. Guest star(s): Francis Magee as Victor Rodenmaar Jr., Mina Anwar as Trudy Rehmann, Paul Antony-Barber as Eric Sweet, Susy Kane as Caroline Denby, John Sackville as Robert Frobisher-Smythe, and Freddie Boath as Benji.
180	30	"House of Moonlighting"	Tessa Hoffe	Bede Blake	March 26, 2013
KT wakes up and sees she is in the secret room. Sibuna find her and explore the room. In the room they find a phonograph and a book that explains to them whats going on. Joy and Jerome wash Mara's dog on their first date and they start to get closer. Denby pretends to find Eddie's laptop and gives it to Patricia implying she found something private on it, to tempt Patricia look at it. Patricia sees the messages on Eddie's laptop and becomes jealous. Patricia and Eddie break up and she leaves in an outrage. In the end, someone is seen smashing the phonograph and faces the screen flashing their eyes red as the sign of a sinner. Guest star(s): Francis Magee as Victor Rodenmaar Jr., Mina Anwar as Trudy Rehmann, Paul Antony-Barber as Eric Sweet, Susy Kane as Caroline Denby, John Sackville as Robert Frobisher-Smythe, and Freddie Boath as Benji. Last appearance of: Freddie Boath as Ben Reed.
181	31	"House of Treachery"	Tracey Rooney	Jodi Reynolds	March 27, 2013
The Anubis House members are putting on a play, with the help of Ms. Denby. Mara, Jerome, and Joy help find the cast members. Victor tries to capture Alfie hoping to make him their next sinner, but fails. Meanwhile, Eddie has a vision of a person smashing the phonograph, while the other Sibuna members (KT, Patricia, Fabian, and Alfie) are watching, laughing. When he has that vision, he announces to the Sibunas that they can trust no one, not even themselves. He also says that one of the Sibuna members smashed the phonograph. So, Fabian tries to look for fingerprints and match them up with the fingerprints on the smashed phonograph. He eventually finds out who it was, KT. At the end of the episode, the new sinner is led into the tank room. Guest star(s): Francis Magee as Victor Rodenmaar Jr., Mina Anwar as Trudy Rehmann, Paul Antony-Barber as Eric Sweet, Susy Kane as Caroline Denby, and John Sackville as Robert Frobisher-Smythe.
182	32	"House of Imposters"	Tracey Rooney	Jodi Reynolds	March 28, 2013
Patricia is revealed to be the second sinner who represents jealousy. She is now very loyal to the adults, but she is buttering up the Sibunas to find a third sinner. The rest of the Sibunas continue to shun KT. They still think she is the sinner, even though she keeps trying to make it very clear she's not. Joy is stuck in the middle between Mara and Jerome. Patricia apologizes to KT and takes her to the gatehouse where she tells KT that she thinks Alfie is the sinner, but then Patricia's eyes turn red indicating that she's evil, and KT is shocked. Guest star(s): Francis Magee as Victor Rodenmaar Jr., Mina Anwar as Trudy Rehmann, Paul Antony-Barber as Eric Sweet, Susy Kane as Caroline Denby, and John Sackville as Robert Frobisher-Smythe.
183	33	"House of Cunning"	Tracey Rooney	Jodi Reynolds	April 1, 2013
KT escapes Patricia's wrath with the help of Harriet Denby, but Patricia swears to get them both. KT and Harriet run to Anubis House and hide in the secret room, then Caroline and Victor come looking for them. KT escapes, but she keeps Harriet there so she will be safe. She goes to the school and catches Patricia lying to the Sibunas, telling them that KT is the sinner. KT convinces them to come to the secret room to see Harriet to prove that she's not lying about Patricia being the sinner, but what she doesn't know is that Caroline caught Harriet and got an ambulance to come pick her up and take her back to the hospital. The Sibunas now really think that KT's the sinner and they lock her up in her room with Patricia, who plans to capture her at 12:00 midnight, but her plan fails thanks to Eddie. Patricia lets herself out the next morning while KT is asleep, but later Willow finds KT and lets her out. The Sibunas find the phonograph put back together and find their next clue in a lullaby that Patricia, Joy, Jerome and Alfie's (the descendants) parents sang to them when they were children, but the lines in each of the four versions are somewhat different from each other. The Sibunas think that these lines in the lullaby might indicate the Earth's equator. They find a globe at Anubis House and find a puzzle piece inside of it, and they need to find three more. Each puzzle piece stands for one of the four descendants. Patricia tells Victor about the pieces, and Eddie catches her talking to him. When she comes out of Victor's office, Eddie asks her why she was talking to Victor, and she says "Oh, Eddie. I so wish you hadn't asked me that. ". Her eyes then turn red and the episode ends. Guest star(s): Francis Magee as Victor Rodenmaar Jr., Mina Anwar as Trudy Rehmann, Paul Antony-Barber as Eric Sweet, Susy Kane as Caroline Denby, and John Sackville as Robert Frobisher-Smythe. Note: This episode is also known as "House of Rage".
184	34	"House of Suspicion"	Tracey Rooney	Jodi Reynolds	April 2, 2013
Patricia tells Eddie that she was distracting Victor. Joy finds out Willow is her long lost cousin after hearing her sing the lullaby. KT quits and attempts to escape to visit her aunt in London. Frobisher has to capture sinners himself after Patricia and Victor don't. Frobisher attempts to capture Mara but Trudy comes and he decides on her instead. Fabian sees Patricia's eyes turn red and starts to suspect her. KT gets caught by Victor and is locked in her room, but she escapes through the window. Fabian [now thinking K.T. is innocent] rushes to the House to search for her, but finds a package instead. He learns that sinners have red eyes, and immediately exclaims "Patricia!" While Fabian learns this, someone opens the door. The episode ends as Fabian stares at them in shock. Guest star(s): Francis Magee as Victor Rodenmaar Jr., Mina Anwar as Trudy Rehmann, Paul Antony-Barber as Eric Sweet, Susy Kane as Caroline Denby, and John Sackville as Robert Frobisher-Smythe.
185	35	"House of Capture"	Tim Hopewell	Diane Whitley	April 3, 2013
Mr. Sweet becomes the third sinner of envy by being tricked by Victor and Caroline Denby and starts Being very mean. Frobisher enters Fabian's room, plays at being sick, and tricks him into going to the gatehouse with him, and Fabian believes him. He becomes the fourth sinner of pride when Frobisher tricks him into admitting he was proud of himself for solving the House's booby traps. Frobisher locks him in the sarcophagus. At the school, it is the day of the play and Jerome finds out about Mara and Joy's revenge plan, and he is crushed. The revenge plot backfires when Jerome dumps Joy on stage. KT gets a call from Fabian [before he trusted Frobisher] and decides to return. Eddie now knows that Patricia is the sinner, but he doesn't know that Fabian has just become one. Patricia tries to capture Alfie, but Eddie stops her. KT runs into Fabian at the school and he tells her that Frobisher is after them and that he can take her to a safe place. Her fault is that she trusts him. What she doesn't know is that Fabian is a sinner and that the "safe place" is the gatehouse... Guest star(s): Francis Magee as Victor Rodenmaar Jr., Mina Anwar as Trudy Rehmann, Paul Antony-Barber as Eric Sweet, Susy Kane as Caroline Denby, and John Sackville as Robert Frobisher-Smythe.
186	36	"House of Heartbreak"	Tim Hopewell	Diane Whitley	April 4, 2013
Joy goes after Jerome, and he just ignores her. Mara gets mad about Jerome dumping Joy and ruining their revenge plan. KT questions why Fabian just now believes her and he explains about Patricia. Eddie, Alfie, and Patricia go looking for KT and Fabian, and Eddie told Alfie that Patricia works with Team Evil. Jerome doesn't want to talk to Joy, but Joy insists. KT still thinks Fabian is on the good team. Eddie tries to help Patricia remember the rhyme, then she admits her sister, Piper, was the one who liked nursery rhymes. So Eddie contacts Piper and she tells him the rhyme. Joy tells Fabian that Jerome has dumped her. Fabian tells her that he dumped her because everyone can't stand her and she should be happy anyone went out with her at all and Joy is surprised. Denby and Victor are putting together an after-show party to keep the Anubis kids distracted. Joy tells Alfie that Fabian was acting strange, and Alfie then realizes that Fabian is a sinner. He then runs to find him and KT before KT becomes a sinner. Fabian tells KT that Alfie is a sinner and Alfie continues to chase after them. KT can't decide whom to believe is the sinner-Alfie or Fabian? She then runs off to the Gate House [since Fabian convinced her that is what the parcel meant] and Alfie goes after her. Eddie contacts Patricia's sister, Piper and asks her about the nursery rhyme. Patricia catches Eddie with her laptop but Piper refuses to tell her what he is doing and gets her to back off. Jerome and Joy run into each other and Willow tells Joy she knows she fell for Jerome. Willow then reveals to Mara that Joy fell for Jerome and he dumped her. Alfie is still running after KT and Fabian is following him. Mara gets angry at Joy for liking him. Alfie runs into Eddie and tells him Fabian is a sinner. Frobisher is upset that Fabian has not brought KT to him. At the House, Alfie confronts Fabian about being a sinner. Fabian responds by telling no one will believe Alfie and he can convince them Alfie got it wrong because Alfie always gets it wrong. He also says that he will always be two steps ahead and Alfie is the joke of the group. The end shows that Eddie finds KT and Frobisher sneaks up behind Eddie. Guest star(s): Francis Magee as Victor Rodenmaar Jr., Mina Anwar as Trudy Rehmann, Paul Antony-Barber as Eric Sweet, Susy Kane as Caroline Denby, John Sackville as Robert Frobisher-Smythe, and Nikita Ramsey as Piper Williamson. Last appearance of: Nikita Ramsey as Piper Williamson.
187	37	"House of Hog"	Tim Hopewell	Bede Blake	April 8, 2013
Frobisher tries to capture Eddie and sinners try to make him angry but Eddie tricks them and doesn't become a sinner; Alfie provokes Fabian by saying he is not as smart as Mara and that Nina dumped him because he is not sporty. He then records Fabian's eyes glowing red and shows them to KT; They try to dispatch a plan on how to rescue Eddie, Meanwhile Willow finds a hedgehog and names him Victor; KT and Alfie rescue Eddie but Alfie says they have to stay here for his artifact is in the chimney; Mara and Joy argue which causes Mara to lose little Victor, but little did they know he was under the bed the whole time. Fabian and Patricia cause trouble to cover up Eddie's absence. Joy asks Jerome to help get a hedgehog for Willow and he accepts but he's still upset with Joy; They end up finding the other hedgehog and Mara says that the hedgehogs have a good connection with their families; Willow names the other Hedgehog Trudy. As Alfie climbs up the chimney and gets his artifact, Frobisher hears and walks towards the chimney. Alfie jumps over to get the artifact, when Frobisher is about to look up the chimney. Guest star(s): Francis Magee as Victor Rodenmaar Jr., Mina Anwar as Trudy Rehmann, Paul Antony-Barber as Eric Sweet, Susy Kane as Caroline Denby, and John Sackville as Robert Frobisher-Smythe.
188	38	"House of Defeat"	Tim Hopewell	Neil Jones	April 9, 2013
Frobisher sees Alfie. Alfie attempts to run, but Victor stops him. Eddie and KT get the box and Alfie gets taken by Frobisher. Willow is trying to keep the hedgehogs but Joy and Mara try to convince her they are wild. Alfie gets threatened by Frobisher by saying he will get Willow and Alfie becomes the last sinner of anger. KT and Eddie go looking for the summer house. Frobisher must compare for Ammut. Fabian and Patricia go off tearing the last page out of each book then say they are going to find the last piece and destroy it. Joy and Jerome each have a terrible itching since they awoken. Trudy thinks they have had an infestation of fleas. Fabian and Patricia figure out where the summer house is and KT and Eddie have to find it first though. All of the Anubis house has fleas. Alfie is being mean to Willow and says "Get away from me flea bag." Alfie breaks up with Willow and goes straight away flirts with Joy and Mara. Fabian and Patricia take out Frobisher's old diaries and, "accidentally", tell Eddie and K.T. where to find the summerhouse. There, Eddie and KT find a stained glass window with hieroglyphics on it and figure out that the statue under it is where the artifact is hidden. KT screams because Patricia has her and Fabian and her are threatening him to give them the artifact and KT wants Eddie to leave. They trick them with the "pigeon poop". Frobisher has Denby go to the Anubis house to verify everything is ok. KT and Eddie put together the artifacts. Eddie has a vision to place the staff in the center of the sinners room. Denby catches KT. Eddie leaves to put the staff in its rightful place. Willow is really upset over Alfie. Willow sets the hedgehogs free. Joy and Mara make up. Eddie runs into Willow. Eddie drops the key and Willow takes it. Jerome is still itching when Alfie starts dissing him about his girlfriends. Alfie makes Jerome feel bad for hurting Joy. Denby and Fabian and Patricia ask KT for the last time where Eddie is. Eddie has arrived at the gatehouse and all the sinners are summoned back. Eddie approaches Patricia about her feelings and kisses her but it turns out to be a trick and Eddie and KT run to place the staff. Ammut is rising, but Eddie is just in time to stop her. Frobisher and the sinners are laughing because the staff was actually the staff needed for the event. Ammut arises from the underworld. Guest star(s): Francis Magee as Victor Rodenmaar Jr., Mina Anwar as Trudy Rehmann, Paul Antony-Barber as Eric Sweet, Susy Kane as Caroline Denby, and John Sackville as Robert Frobisher-Smythe.
189	39	"House of Ammut"	Tim Hopewell	Neil Jones	April 10, 2013
KT and Eddie try to escape but the sinners tell them not to leave and to hand over the key; but Eddie shortly realizes they do not have it, Ammut is unleashed and asks for more souls; it turns out Denby changed the recording to say that they needed the staff to stop Frobisher. KT and Eddie escape at this point and Victor hurries after them; KT and Eddie ask people if they have seen her key but Denby calls them for an assembly and they know it's too late; Meanwhile, while everyone attends the assembly, Frobisher captures everyone's soul except for Willow and immediately runs; She bumps into Eddie and KT on the stage and tells what has happened and she doesn't know what was going on; Earlier, Trudy helped through her sadness over Alfie's rude break up and told her to go to Mr. Sweet about the flea problem and Trudy tells Jerome to write a letter for Joy; Victor is looking for them and they all run; They all run but are crowded by the chaotic people and Frobisher tells them "there is nowhere to hide"; Harriet drives in and takes them which causes him to grow angry; Harriet tells them that KT's key protects people from Ammut and if they get Denby's key, in legend, it is said to stop the evil if they places these keys on the staff; Meanwhile at Anubis house, Alfie, Patricia, Frobisher and the rest of the sinners trick the remainders (Joy, Jerome, Mara, and Trudy) and takes their souls away so that Ammut can get stronger and develop a human form; Meanwhile, Willow, KT, Eddie, and Harriet go to the gatehouse to see Denby asleep with her sun key on. Harriet and Eddie hide as the others, KT and Willow try to take the key off of her. They almost have the key off of her when... Denby wakes up. Guest star(s): Francis Magee as Victor Rodenmaar Jr., Mina Anwar as Trudy Rehmann, Paul Antony-Barber as Eric Sweet, Susy Kane as Caroline Denby, John Sackville as Robert Frobisher-Smythe, and Felicity Gilbert as Ammut. First appearance of Felicity Gilbert as Ammut.
190	40	"House of Heroes"	Tim Hopewell	Neil Jones	April 11, 2013
Willow and KT are about to take the key off Miss Denby, until she wakes up. Miss Denby turns them both into sinners. Willow unveils Harriet and Eddie, who try to escape. Victor arrives, so he and KT go after them. KT catches up to Harriet and Eddie. She tells them she is normal and not a sinner. Eddie doesn't trust her but Harriet does and explains why. Harriet took the key from Willow and put it in KT's pocket to protect her. KT is furious. Meanwhile, Robert and the others prepare for a celebration hoping to capture more sinners. Eddie, KT, and Harriet go to the gatehouse and trick Fabian into letting them in. They head up to the tank room and see Miss Denby talking to Ammut. KT attempts to take her key but nearly gets turned into a sinner. Harriet saves her and gets her the key but she turns into a sinner. The endless storm begins. Eddie and KT assemble the key, but Robert comes in and tries to interfere. They put it in the keyhole and vanquish Ammut who takes Miss Denby with her. Robert is now old and very proud of KT. Everyone turns back to normal and don't remember anything. Patricia and Eddie as well as Alfie and Willow are now back together. Victor announces that they will go ahead and have a celebration. Mara sets aside her feelings and let Joy and Jerome be together. Robert and Harriet set off for Egypt. Fabian and Mara develop a liking for each other. In the end, Anubis house enjoys a nice firework display and love's flames start to take place. Note: This is the only season without a cliffhanger at the finale. (Season 1: Cup of Ankh at bottom of stage, Season 2: Victor with Tears of Gold). Guest star(s): Francis Magee as Victor Rodenmaar Jr., Mina Anwar as Trudy Rehmann, Paul Antony-Barber as Eric Sweet, Susy Kane as Caroline Denby, John Sackville as Robert Frobisher-Smythe, Bryony Afferson as Harriet Denby, and Felicity Gilbert as Ammut. Last appearance of: Susy Kane as Caroline Denby, Bryony Afferson as Harriet Denby, John Sackville as Robert Frobisher-Smythe, and Felicity Gilbert as Ammut.

=== Special: The Touchstone of Ra (2013) ===
- On May 21, 2013, Nickelodeon announced a special episode of House of Anubis, "Touchstone of Ra".
- On June 14, 2013, the special premiered on Nickelodeon (UK & Ireland), ahead of the U.S. premiere on TeenNick on June 17, 2013, and reached 90,000 views in UK and Ireland. Ratings of the premiere in other countries were never announced.

No.	Title	Directed by	Written by	Original release date	Viewers (millions)
Special	"The Touchstone of Ra"	Angelo Abela	Diane Whitley & Tim Compton	June 14, 2013 (UK) (Nickelodeon); June 17, 2013 (U.S.) (TeenNick)	0.092 (UK)
On their last day of school, Mr. Sweet announces a trip to an Egyptian Museum and Mara as their valedictorian. At Anubis House, the newbies – Cassie, Erin, and Dexter – have moved in early because of bedbugs in the middle school. While leaving for the museum, Eddie and Fabian meet Sophia. At the museum, Alfie and Willow discuss college but Willow isn't as excited as Alfie. Eddie, Sophia, and Dexter learn about the Touchstone of Ra. Back at Anubis House, Mr. Sweet tells the residents that an exhibit went missing during their museum visit, so Mr. Sweet and Victor conduct a bag search. Eddie reaches into his bag and finds the Touchstone inside. Mr. Sweet finds the Touchstone and confiscates it. Victor puts the stone in his safe. Mysteriously the lights go out, causing Victor and Mr. Sweet to leave the house. The Anubis residents plan a feast in the cellar. In the cellar, Alfie and Jerome scare the others, which causes Willow and Sophia to go upstairs. Sophia goes into Victor's office and the house starts shaking. The Touchstone opens Victor's safe and Sophia claims the Touchstone and her revenge on Anubis House. When Eddie, KT, and Dexter come in, Sophia acts innocent. Eddie takes the Touchstone and hides it. Eddie, KT, and Sophia return to the cellar through the secret passage. When Victor and Mr. Sweet come back, they hear noises in the cellar and investigate. Everybody hides when they hear Victor. Victor and Mr. Sweet find some of the students. Victor explains that when the Pyramid of Ra is built a human sacrifice must be made and that the other stone pieces are buried in the grounds. After they leave, Sibuna talk about the Touchstone and Sophia is welcomed into Sibuna. Mara starts to get suspicious but their conversation is cut short when Victor comes back into the cellar. Meanwhile, Joy, Jerome, and Willow, prepare the Graduation and Prom. Back at Anubis House, Dexter catches Sophia sneaking out of Eddie's room. Victor is trying to find the other stones. Dexter follows Sophia and sees her with the Touchstone. Eddie finds out the Touchstone is gone and blames Dexter when he comes in. Dexter tells them to ask Sophia but Eddie doesn't listen and tells him to leave when Sophia arrives. Sophia continues to act innocent around the other Sibuna members. Mara comes in and show them coordinates on a piece of paper she took from Victor's journal, this lands her a spot in Sibuna. Later that night, Sibuna have a dig and find a Canopic Jar. After Mr. Sweet catches and punishes them Sophia runs out and Eddie goes after her. Back at Anubis House, Eddie finds Sophia with the Touchstone and she gives up her identity. Sophia explains that all it took was a few bedbugs, a forged invitation, and she thanks Eddie for bringing in the Touchstone for her. Dexter momentarily distracts Sophia giving Eddie a chance to snatch the Touchstone and runs. Eddie smashes it but it pieces back together and knocks him out (or Sophia thinks it does). Sophia reclaims the Touchstone and possesses Dexter who came in behind her and orders him to get her the Canopic Jar. When Sophia turns back around Eddie is gone. Eddie follows Dexter and causes the Canopic Jar to smash after he tackle him. Eddie follows him to Frobisher's Crypt. At the crypt, Sophia tries to possess him but can't and learns he's the Osirian. Sophia leaves the crypt, trapping him and Dexter who is no longer possessed. The Remaining Sibuna Members go to the school. Alfie ask Willow whats going on, she says she can't go to the same college as Alfie because she needs an extra credit in Business Ed and she decided to help with the decorations but she forgot to order the Valedictorian Medal for Mr. Sweet. So Alfie decides to help her. At the school, Fabian and Mara see the Canopic Jar broken in pieces. Fabian sees Hieroglyphics on the Jar pieces and studies them. In Mr. Sweet's Office, KT and Alfie learn that Sophia has been enrolled in the school many times before. Back at Anubis House, the girls get ready for the Prom. Later, Cassie, Erin, and Sophia come help with the decorations hoping to get an invite to the Prom. KT notices Sophia has her key and thinks Eddie is in the crypt. Patricia gets it back for her. Fabian tells the others that when the sacrifice is made whoever held the Touchstone turns to stone. While leaving to rescue Eddie, Alfie finds a dirty coin and thinks it could be used as a medal. After rescuing Eddie, they split up. KT and Eddie search Sophia's room for the Touchstone and the others search for the other stone pieces in the school. KT finds the Touchstone when Sophia comes in. Eddie and Sophia fight for the Touchstone. Victor arrives and wants the Touchstone. Eddie doesn't give it to him and run. Chaos goes throughout the house. The Touchstone traps them but Fabian rescues them and Sophia runs after them. Meanwhile, Dexter explains to Erin and Cassie that whoever touched the Touchstone turns to stone. Mr. Sweet finds out Willow didn't order the Valedictorian Medal, which means she won't get her extra credit. Victor helps Sibuna find the other stone pieces. Victor and Fabian check out the Canopic Jar again. Alfie finds Willow and gives her the dirty coin he found. After Willow cleans it he sees the Symbol of Ra on it and tries to get it back but lets her have it. Dexter, Erin, and Cassie follow Eddie and KT into the woods. Eddie gives the Touchstone to KT and welcomes Dexter, Erin, and Cassie into Sibuna since they'll be staying in Anubis House the next term. After he's done, they can't find KT and the Touchstone anywhere. Meanwhile, Victor and Fabian learn that the sacrifice must wear the symbol of Ra. Alfie tells Mara about the coin with the symbol of Ra on it. Everyone gathers in the main hall and Mara knows where the other stone pieces are. Everybody goes to the graduation except Eddie and the newbies. Before, she leaves, Patricia gives Eddie one last kiss. They help Victor search for the other stones in the cellar. At the graduation, Mara tell the others about Alfie's coin but they see Willow give it to Mr. Sweet. Then, the graduation starts. Sophia goes back to Anubis House and summon the other stones which causes the house to fall. Eddie keeps it standing using his Osirian powers and knows where Sophia is. Mara is awarded the valedictorian medal and Fabian sees the Symbol of Ra on it. Fabian remembers that the sacrifice must wear the Symbol of Ra and he rushes to the stage to get it, but fails and leaves with the other Sibuna members. Mara wears the medal and is possessed causing her to walk off. Meanwhile, Sophia has completed the Pyramid of Ra. KT is Sophia's chosen sacrifice but Fabian tells her it won't work because she isn't wearing the coin. Sophia stops KT. Fabian tries to block Mara but fails. Eddie grabs the coin and it comes off, causing Ra to rain down his anger. Victor explains that the Osirian must give up his powers to save the world. Eddie claims the gold and stops Ra but faints. Now he is a normal boy. Afterwards, they have a proper graduation and attend the prom. Victor decides to leave Anubis House and keep the Touchstone safe. Before Victor leaves, all the Anubis residents gather to say a final good-bye to him. Back at the prom, everybody is happy. Mara and Fabian share a kiss. Patricia ask Eddie to dance and he agrees. The camera angles to show the "Anubis House" banner. Starring: Burkely Duffield as Eddie Miller, Jade Ramsey as Patricia Williamson, Klariza Clayton as Joy Mercer, Eugene Simon as Jerome Clarke, Alexandra Shipp as KT Rush, Brad Kavanagh as Fabian Rutter, Alex Sawyer as Alfie Lewis, Louisa Connolly-Burnham as Willow Jenks, Tasie Lawrence as Mara Jaffray, Francis Magee as Victor Rodenmaar, Mina Anwar as Trudy Rehman and Paul Antony-Barber as Eric Sweet. Introducing: Jake Davis as Dexter, Kae Alexander as Erin, Roxy Fitzgerald as Cassie, and Claudia Jessie as Sophia. Notes: This was marketed as a 90-minute special; minus advertisement breaks, the special runs to around 70 minutes. Bobby Lockwood makes a cameo in this episode. Last appearance of: Tasie Lawrence as Mara Jaffray, Klariza Clayton as Joy Mercer, Francis Magee as Victor Rodenmaar, Burkely Duffield as Eddie Miller, Jade Ramsey as Patricia Williamson, Eugene Simon as Jerome Clarke, Alexandra Shipp as KT Rush, Brad Kavanagh as Fabian Rutter, Alex Sawyer as Alfie Lewis, Louisa Connolly-Burnham as Willow Jenks, Mina Anwar as Trudy Rehman, Paul Antony-Barber as Eric Sweet, and Bobby Lockwood.
