= Burkely Duffield =

Canadian actor (born 1992)

- Born: August 9, 1992 (age 34); Canada
- Occupation: Actor
- Years active: 2006–present
- Relatives: Victoria Duffield (sister)

Burkely Duffield (born August 9, 1992) is a Canadian actor known for his roles as Eddie Miller in House of Anubis and as Holden Matthews in Beyond. His sister is actress and singer Victoria Duffield.

== Career ==
Duffield made his screen debut in the 2006 drama film Under the Mistletoe. He then went on to play a main role in the Nickelodeon mystery series, House of Anubis.

From 2017–2018, Duffield starred in the main role of Holden Matthews in the sci-fi drama series Beyond, which lasted two seasons.

In August 2019, Duffield was cast in the Netflix slasher film There's Someone Inside Your House. The film was released on October 6, 2021.

== Filmography ==
=== Film ===
Year	Title	Role	Notes
2007	Pathfinder	Ghost at 12 years old	
2007	Kickin It Old Skool	George Michael kid	
2007	Numb	Young Hudson Milbank	
2008	Ace of Hearts	Kenny	
2016	Warcraft	Callan Lothar	
2018	The Miracle Season	Alex	
2021	There's Someone Inside Your House	Caleb Greeley	

=== Television ===
Year	Title	Role	Notes
2006	Under the Mistletoe	Jonathan Chandler	TV film
2007	Masters of Science Fiction	Will	Episode: "A Clean Escape"
2008	Aliens in America	Beekeeper kid	Episode: "Wake at the Lake"
2011	And Baby Will Fall	Young David Rose	TV film
2011	Mega Cyclone	Luke Tanner	TV film
2012	Rags	Lloyd McGowens	TV film
2012	A Mother's Nightmare	Matt	TV film
2012, 2019	Supernatural	Ray McAnn / Billy Whittman	Episodes: "Party On, Garth" and "Atomic Monsters"
2012–2013	House of Anubis	Eddie Miller	Main role (seasons 2–3)
2013	Anubis Unlocked	Himself	13 episodes
2013	House of Anubis: Touchstone of Ra	Eddie Miller	TV special
2013	The Tomorrow People	Tyler Miller	Episode: "Girl, Interrupted"
2013	Jinxed	Tommy Murphy	TV film
2014	My Mother's Future Husband	Bodie Miller	TV film
2014	Paper Angels	Vic West	TV film
2015	Minority Report	Teen Arthur Watson	2 episodes
2015	One Crazy Cruise	Waiter	TV film
2017–2018	Beyond	Holden Matthews	Main role
2017	The Arrangement	Ben Geller	2 episodes
2022	Caught in His Web	Nathan	TV film, Lifetime
2024	Dead Boy Detectives	Brad	Episode: "The Case of the Two Dead Dragons"
2026	A Little Park Music	Freddie	TV film, Hallmark
