= Sartaj Garewal =

British actor and voice artist

- Born: Wiltshire, South West England
- Occupation: Actor
- Years active: 2000-present

Sartaj Garewal is a British actor and voice artist who works in films, TV, theatre and audio. His films include Hell in Paradise (2025), Men in Black: International (2019), Perfect Skin (2018), Wasteland (2018), The League of Extraordinary Gentlemen (2003), Dirty War (2004), and The Infidel (2010).

== Biography ==
Born and raised in Wiltshire, Garewal holds a BA(Hons) Accounting & Finance. He founded leadership development consultancy, Dynamic Presenting Ltd and lives in London.

== Career ==
Notable stage performances include Behind The Beautiful Forevers (National Theatre) 2015 and Wipers (Leicester Curve) 2016. Other theatre includes Romeo & Juliet (Royal Exchange Manchester), Taming of the Shrew (Arcola Theatre), East is East (New Vic Theatre, Stoke), Too Close to Home (Lyric Hammersmith, and Tinderbox (Bush Theatre) 2008.

He played the lead role of Kuljit in the BBC radio drama Silver Street for six years and has narrated various audiobooks including Cutting For Stone by Abraham Verghese, The Billionaire Raj(FT & Mckinsey Business Book of the Year(2018) and The Unexpected Inheritance of Inspector Chopra - Audiofile Earphones Award winner. He has also featured on The Archers and BBC Radio 4's Book At Bedtime.

He has also appeared in Hindi language "Bollywood" films Desi Boyz(2011) alongside John Abraham and Tezz(2010).

Garewal played Jasper Choudhury in over 50 episodes in season 2 of the US teen drama House of Anubis for Nickelodeon in 2012. Other screen credits include The Gold (BBC) 2022, This Country (BBC) 2020 and the feature film Men in Black International (Columbia/Sony) 2019. In 2023, he portrayed the role of Professor Abid Anwar in the BBC soap opera Doctors.

== Filmography ==
Year	Title	Role	Notes
2023	Doctors	Professor Abid Anwar	Recurring role
2012	Tezz	Anil's Friend	
2012	House of Anubis	Jasper Choudhuary	39 episodes
2012	L8r	Mr. Ackland	episode: Youngers 2
2011	Desi Boyz	Menon	
2010	Law and Order: UK	Ravi Luthra	episode: Defence
2010	Non-Resident	Raj	Short
2010	Baseline	Fiaz	
2010	The Infidel	Wasif	
2008	Christie	Mo	Video Short
2006	The Amazing Adrenalini Brothers	Darshan	Voice
2003-2004	Casualty	PC Whatmore / PC Davies	TV series
2004	Dirty War	Bomb Incident Room Officer	TV movie
2004	Keen Eddie	PC Henning	episode: Liberté, Egalité, Fraternité
2003	The League of Extraordinary Gentlemen	Rocket Room Crewman	
2003	Doctors	Malvin Dale	episode: Assisted Passage
2000	The Bill	Rudy Ramphal	episode: Riot City
2000	EastEnders	Paramedic	episode: Episode dated 17 January 2000
