= Alex Sawyer =

English actor

- Born: Alexander James Sawyer; 13 February 1993 (age 33); Kent, England
- Occupations: Actor, director, singer, songwriter
- Years active: 2011–present

Alexander James Sawyer (born 13 February 1993) is an English actor, singer, songwriter and director. He is best known for his roles as Alfie Lewis in House of Anubis and Topher in The End of the F***ing World. In 2018, he began portraying David Oumou in Get Shorty.

== Early life ==
Alexander James Sawyer was born in Kent on 13 February 1993, the son of a Ghanaian mother and English-Finnish father. He attended Avenue Primary School in Belmont, Greater London; Aberdour School in Burgh Heath, Surrey; and King's College School in the Wimbledon district of London.

== Career ==
Sawyer began acting at the age of nine when he was in a production of Oliver! as one of the chorus members in a local theatre. He attended classes at Laine Theatre Arts from the age of 11, and in 2010 after appearing in a school production of Joe Penhall's Blue/Orange was scouted by an agent, starting his career as an actor.

He starred as Alfie Lewis on House of Anubis for Nickelodeon which he appeared in up to and inclusive of the third season as well as the TV Movie Special, Touchstone of Ra. Sawyer and the rest of the cast won two Kid's Choice Awards for Favourite Show over the course of the series, in 2011 and 2013.

In late 2013, Sawyer released his debut single "Relapse" featuring Tasie Lawrence.

At the end of 2016, Sawyer was cast in the BBC series Eve as Michael Hoffman. The next year, he appeared in the BBC One's Father Brown as Oscar Bergeres and as Kofi, the novice monk on US network Starz's The White Princess.

Sawyer began 2017 appearing as one of the players in the 50th anniversary revival of Tom Stoppard's Rosencrantz and Guildenstern Are Dead at London's Old Vic Theatre, directed by David Leveaux and featuring Daniel Radcliffe and Joshua McGuire. In summer 2017, he released another single, "Sunlite". A music video was released featuring cameos from actors Louisa Connolly-Burnham and Bobby Lockwood.

In early 2018, Sawyer appeared as Topher in the critically acclaimed Netflix/Channel 4 series The End of the F***ing World. Later that year, he joined the cast of the Epix series Get Shorty for the second season.

Alex was cast as the alternate Alexander Hamilton in the hit musical Hamilton in 2022 at the Victoria Palace Theatre in London, eventually taking the part full time from June 2024.

== Filmography ==
=== Television ===
Year	Title	Role	Notes
2011–2013	House of Anubis	Alfie Lewis	Regular Role
2011–2013	Anubis Unlocked	Himself	19 episodes
2013	House of Anubis: Touchstone of Ra	Alfie Lewis	TV special
2016	Lost in the West	Jimmy the Kid	TV mini-series Episode: "Part 1"
2016	Eve	Michael Hoffman	Recurring (season 3)
2017	Father Brown	Oscar Bergeres	Episode: "The Crimson Feather"
2017	The White Princess	Kofi, Novice Monk	TV mini-series Episode: "English Bood on English Soil"
2017	The End of the F***ing World	Topher	2 episodes
2017	Michael Jackson: Man in the Mirror	Teenage Michael	Television film documentary
2018–2019	Get Shorty	David	8 episodes
2019	Harlots	Jack Lively	7 episodes
2022-2026	Supertato	Supertato	Main voice role

=== Film ===
Year	Title	Role	Notes
2014	Relapse	Alan	Short film; director/producer
2016	Fred	Tyler	Short film
2016	Fox Trap	Niall	
2017	Sinners	Alf Vargo	Short film
2017	National Theatre Live: Rosencrantz & Guildenstern Are Dead	Player	
2018	Macbeth	Young Officer	
2019	When Fate Calls	Boss	Short film

=== Theatre ===
Year	Title	Role	Venue	Notes
2015	Alice in Wonderland	Cheshire Cat	Octagon Theatre	
2017	Rosencrantz and Guildenstern are Dead	Player	The Old Vic	
2016	Pride and Prejudice	George Wickham	Nottingham Playhouse/York Theatre Royal	
2018	Girl From the North Country	Ensemble	Noël Coward Theatre	
2022	Hamilton	Alexander Hamilton	Victoria Palace Theatre	

== Discography ==
=== Extended plays ===
Title	Details
The Illusion of Perfect	Released: February 13, 2021; Format: Digital download, streaming; Label: Independent

=== Singles ===
Title	Year	Album
"Relapse" (featuring Tasie Lawrence)	2013	Non-album singles
"Sunlite"	2017	Non-album singles
"Like I Do"	2018	The Illusion of Perfect
"Panic"	2019	The Illusion of Perfect
"Loveless"	2020	The Illusion of Perfect
