= The Reef (2010 film) =

Australian Horror film written and directed by Andrew Traucki

- Theatrical release poster
- Directed by: Andrew Traucki
- Written by: Andrew Traucki
- Produced by: Andrew Traucki; Michael Robertson
- Starring: Damian Walshe-Howling; Zoe Naylor; Adrienne Pickering; Gyton Grantley; Kieran Darcy-Smith
- Cinematography: Daniel Ardillery
- Edited by: Peter Crombie
- Music by: Rafael May
- Production company: Atlas Entertainment
- Distributed by: Lightning Entertainment
- Release date: 13 May 2010 (Cannes)
- Running time: 94 minutes
- Country: Australia
- Language: English
- Budget: $3.8 million
- Box office: $124,764 (Australia)

The Reef is a 2010 Australian survival horror film, written, directed and produced by Andrew Traucki in his second feature film (the first being Black Water). The film is about a group of friends who capsize while sailing to Indonesia and are stalked by a great white shark as they try to swim to a nearby island.

A spiritual sequel titled The Reef: Stalked, also written, directed and produced by Traucki, was released in 2022, and similarly features a cast of characters trying to survive a great white shark stalking them.

== Plot ==
Luke (Damian Walshe-Howling) is delivering a yacht to a customer in Indonesia, and invites his friend, Matt (Gyton Grantley), and Matt's girlfriend, Suzie (Adrienne Pickering), to join him as he sails there, along with Matt's sister, Kate (Zoe Naylor), and fellow sailor, Warren (Kieran Darcy-Smith). To get to Indonesia, they must sail through a coral reef. On the second day of their journey, the yacht strikes part of the reef and capsizes when the keel is destroyed, allowing water in.

With the current taking them further away from land, Luke gathers supplies from the overturned vessel with the intention of swimming to nearby Turtle Island. With the group gathered on top of the overturned hull, Warren activates the yacht's EPIRB, but Luke informs him that it is an older model that requires a plane to fly overhead to receive the signal. When Luke suggests the others join him in swimming to the island, which he estimates to be twelve miles away, Warren refuses, as he believes the water is shark-infested. With encouragement, Suzie and Matt follow Luke into the water as he begins the journey. Kate also initially refuses, but changes her mind shortly after and comes with the group, leaving Warren alone on the overturned boat.

During their journey, the group find the carcass of a sea turtle that has had its head bitten off. On the overturned yacht, Warren spots a large great white shark circling the vessel. Soon, the group is stalked by the same shark. It approaches them several times, even brushing past Kate before leaving. Kate and Suzie are supported by Matt and Luke as they are both in shock. However, during the encounter, Kate lost the bodyboard she was using as a flotation device. When Matt attempts to retrieve it, he is attacked by the shark. His legs are severed and he quickly dies from blood loss. As night falls, Luke, Kate and Suzie are once more stalked by the shark. Suzie blames Luke for talking the group into swimming to an island he seemingly can't find.

In the morning, the group has drifted to a shallow area of the reef, where they are able to stand and rest. In the distance, they can see a larger rock formation protruding from the water, and they swim towards it. Paranoia affects the group as they continue. They share a laugh when they mistake a dolphin for the shark that took Matt. However, the shark soon returns and kills Suzie. Luke and Kate rest on the reef, and they declare their love for each other. They begin to swim the final distance to the rocks as the shark closes in. Luke assists Kate to climb to safety, but she is unable to help him up the rock. The shark seizes him and drags him underwater. As she sits on the barren rock, Kate scans the ocean as she continues to call Luke's name and cries hysterically in devastation.

The written epilogue reveals that Kate was rescued by a fishing boat the next day, however extensive searches failed to locate Warren or the vessel.

== Cast ==
- Damian Walshe-Howling as Luke
- Zoe Naylor as Kate
- Adrienne Pickering as Suzie
- Gyton Grantley as Matt
- Kieran Darcy-Smith as Warren
- Mark Simpson as Shane

== Production ==
The film is based on the true story of Ray Boundy, who was the sole survivor of a similar incident in 1983. The film's five-week shoot began on 12 October 2009 in Queensland's Hervey Bay, Fraser Island and Bowen Bay, with additional shark footage completed in South Australia. While in production, cameras were streaming the film online on its website on 5 November. Traucki stated that "This kind of marketing strategy is absolutely vital" and "the mentality inside the Australian industry doesn't usually get behind original marketing strategies like this. I have ended up building this one myself, late at night with my web team."

Rob Gaison, the chief executive of Tourism Tropical North Queensland, was concerned about the film being advertised as "based on a true story" which he felt could hurt the tourist industry for the area. Col McKenzie, the CEO of Association of Marine Park Operators, said that previous films about sharks near reefs attacking people such as Open Water had hurt the tourism industry.

== Release ==
The Reef had its world premiere as a market screening at the Cannes Film Festival in May 2010. It was later shown at South Korea's Pusan Film Festival on 10 October 2010 and Spain's Sitges Film Festival. The film's Australian premiere was in late 2010 at both the Brisbane and Canberra film festivals. The film received a wide Australian release by Pinnacle in March 2011. Director Traucki said that "The biggest release we can hope for is 30 screens, which is what you get for Australian films, unless you make something like Australia."

The film was released straight-to-DVD in the United Kingdom in January 2011.

== Critical response ==
The film received positive reviews from critics, achieving an approval rating of 76% on Rotten Tomatoes based on 17 reviews, with an average score of 6.2/10 with its consensus state: "A gripping example of less-is-more horror, The Reef is the rare shark attack movie that isn't content to merely tread water". Critics praised the use of actual shark footage, as opposed to special effects, in the film, as well as the directing and acting. Crikey described The Reef as "an unnerving winner: tense, twitchy and frighteningly entertaining." Numerous horror review sites gave the film a thumbs up comparing it with Jaws and Open Water. Stuart Wahlin said "The Reef is a good nail-biter I’m happy to recommend, especially to those who share my craving for stories of sharks with a taste for human flesh." Film Horreur says "The Reef turns out to be a good little friendly film that was able to demonstrate a good dose of realism and efficiency without ever falling into the razzle-l'oeil or easy upmanship." The UK Film Review Site HeyUGuys.co.uk said "If you’re a lover of being scared and are looking for the next shark movie that will shake you up since Deep Blue Sea, then this is the one for you!"

== Sequel ==
In November 2020, it was announced that a sequel was in development. Andrew Traucki will return as director, with a script of his own. The Reef: Stalked, a standalone sequel, follows a plot centered around Annie who goes on a kayaking and diving adventure with some friends following the murder of her sister. The group's vacation quickly becomes a fight for survival, when a large great white shark begins to follow and attack them. Production was scheduled to commence principal photography in Australia in late-2020, while the release date was tentatively scheduled for summer 2021. By May 2022, it was announced that RLJE Films will handle distribution in North America, alongside Shudder. The movie stars Teressa Liane, Ann Truong, Saskia Archer, Kate Lister, and Tim Ross. Produced by Neal Kingston, Michael Robertson, Jack Christian and Traucki; the film will be released simultaneously in theaters, via streaming, and through digital VOD release. The Reef: Stalked was released on July 29, 2022.

== See also ==
- List of killer shark films
- Cinema of Australia
