= The Reef =

The Reef may refer to:

== Places ==
- The Reef or The Rand, alternative names for the Witwatersrand, a north-facing scarp in South Africa
- Great Barrier Reef or "The Reef", the planet's largest coral reef
- The Reef or The Reefs, a former mansion in Newport, Rhode Island, in what is now Brenton Point State Park

== Arts, entertainment, and media ==
- The Reef (novel), a 1912 novel by Edith Wharton
  - The Reef (1999 film), a film adaptation of the novel
- The Reef (2010 film), an Australian film
  - The Reef: Stalked, a 2022 sequel
- Shark Bait (2006 film), a 2006 South Korean-American animated film also released as The Reef
  - The Reef 2: High Tide, a 2012 sequel
