= Louisa Connolly-Burnham =

English actress

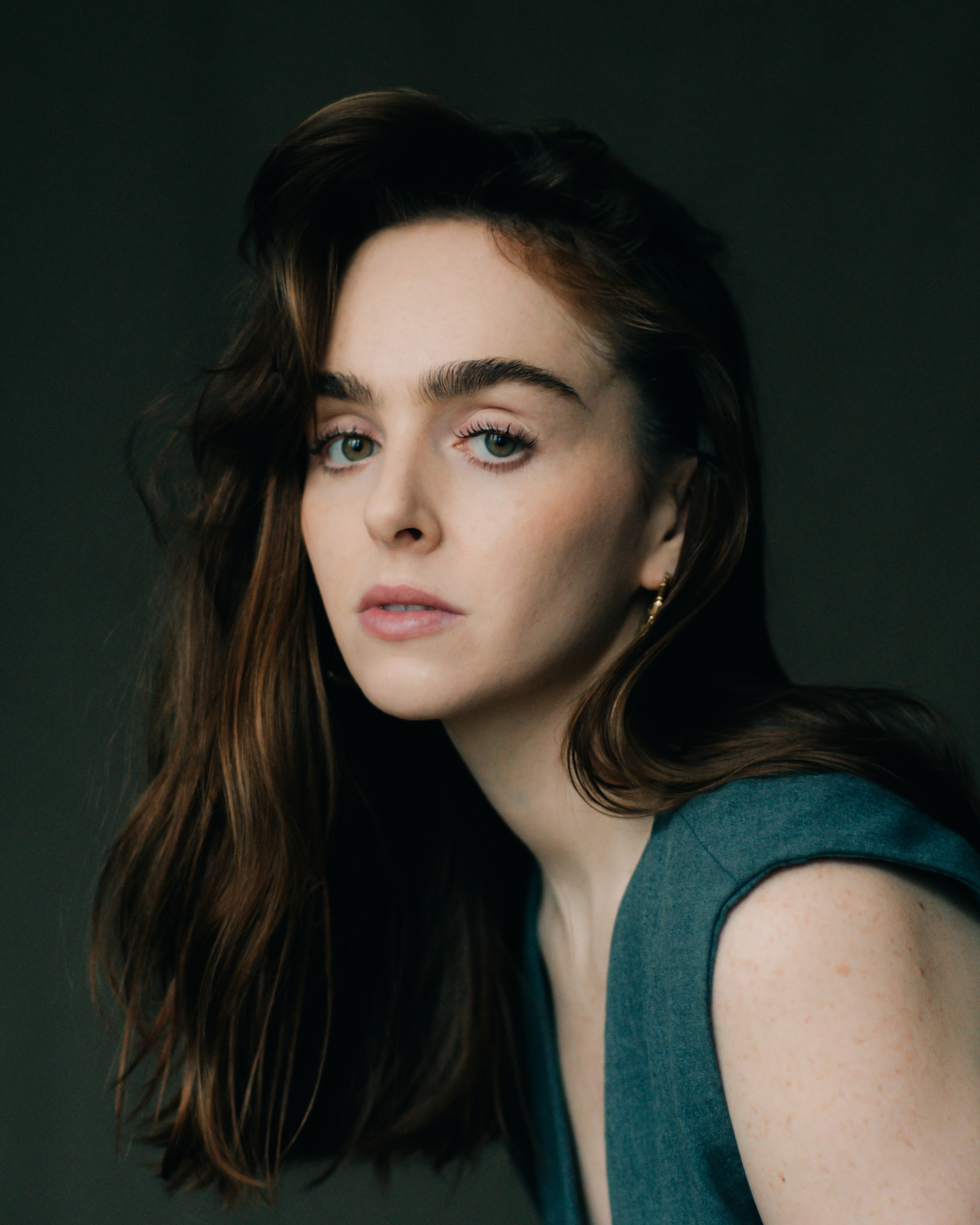
- Born: Louisa Sarah Anne Connolly-Burnham; 23 June 1992 (age 34); Solihull, Warwickshire, England
- Occupations: Actress, filmmaker
- Years active: 2007–present

Louisa Sarah Anne Connolly-Burnham (born 23 June 1992) is an English actress, filmmaker, and musician. She gained prominence through her roles in the CBBC series Wolfblood (2012–2014) and the Nickelodeon series House of Anubis (2013).

She made her directorial debut with the short film The Call Centre (2020). Connolly-Burnham and her partner James New form a music duo called Virens.

== Early life ==
Connolly-Burnham was born in Solihull, West Midlands and grew up in Buckinghamshire with her two brothers. She attended Wycombe High School. Her father enrolled her in Saturday classes at Jackie Palmer Stage School. She went on to train at Arts Educational School, Tring Park.

== Career ==
Connolly-Burnham made her debut with small roles in the 2007 TV movie Coming Down the Mountain and the crime drama series Midsomer Murders. In 2012, Connolly-Burnham got her breakthrough in the BAFTA nominated CBBC hit drama Wolfblood as Shannon Kelly in which she starred alongside Bobby Lockwood, Aimeé Kelly and Kedar Williams-Sterling. She left the show at the end of season three in 2014.

In 2013, Connolly-Burnham played Willow Jenks in the third and final season of the Nickelodeon series House of Anubis. In 2014, she starred in the short film Beneath Water in which she was subsequently nominated for Best Actress at the Queens World Film Festival in 2015. Since then, she has appeared as Avril Fox in the 2014 Christmas special of the BBC period drama Call the Midwife. She has also had roles in Holby City (2015), Death in Paradise (2016), Drifters (2016) and Casualty (2016).

Connolly-Burnham made her stage debut playing a leading role in the 2017 theatre production Tribes at the Crucible Theatre. She has also starred in the stage production Beirut in 2018 at The Park Theatre. In 2019, Connolly-Burnham founded her own production company Thimble Films, and made her directorial debut with the short film The Call Centre (2020), which amassed over 1.5 million views on YouTube and earned Connolly-Burnham a nomination for Best Producer at the Underwire Film Festival UK.

In 2022, Connolly-Burnham returned to television with a recurring role as Silver in the Peacock adaptation of Vampire Academy.

During lockdown, Connolly-Burnham met James New online, and they began making alternative folk music together under the name Virens. Their debut EP Chicken nuggets was released in 2023.

== Filmography ==
=== Film ===
Year	Title	Role	Notes
2014	Beneath Water	Daisy	Short film
2015	Friday Download: The Movie	Clara	
2016	Granatë	Journalist	Short film
2017	Breathe	Emma	Short film
2018	Time Will Tell	Kim	
2018	David and Bathsheba	Bathsheba	Short film
2018	The Marine 6: Close Quarters	Sarah Dillon	
2018	Carly	Melyssa	Short film
2019	Odilo Fabian or (the Possibility of Impossible Dreams)	Alice	Short film
2020	The Call Centre	Paige	Director; short film
2022	A Midsummer Night's Dream	Thaleia	
2024	Sister Wives	Kaidence	
2025	An Imperfect Cadence	Yvonne	Short Film

=== Television ===
Year	Title	Role	Notes
2007	Coming Down the Mountain	School Girl	Television film
2008	Midsomer Murders	Young Lou	Episode: "Left for Dead"
2011	Outnumbered	Shoe Shop Girl	Episode: "The Girls' Day Out"
2011	Little Crackers	Susan Bulter	Episode: "My First Brassiere"
2012–2014	Wolfblood	Shannon Kelly	Main role (series 1–3)
2013	House of Anubis	Willow Jenks	Main role (season 3)
2013	House of Anubis: The Touchstone of Ra	Willow Jenks	TV special
2013	Doctors	Rose Morrison	Episode: "A Curse Be Upon Her"
2014	Call the Midwife	Avril Fox	Episode: "Christmas Special"
2015	Holby City	Rosie Greene	Episode: "Homecoming"
2015	Suspicion	Morgan	Episode: "Edge of Insanity"
2016	Death in Paradise	Kim Sweeney	Episode: "Dishing Up Murder"
2016	Drifters	Sienna	Episode: "Big Break"
2016	Casualty	Penny Levitt	Episode: "All I Want for Christmas Is You"
2022	Vampire Academy	Silver	Recurring role

=== Video games ===
Year	Title	Role	Notes
2020	South of the Circle	Peter	

== Stage ==
Year	Title	Role	Venue
2017	Tribes	Ruth	Crucible Theatre
2018	Beirut	Blue	The Park Theatre

== Awards and nominations ==
Year	Award	Category	Work	Result	Ref
2015	Queens World Film Festival	Best Actress	Beneath Water	Won	
2019	Underwire Film Festival	Best Producer	The Call Centre	Nominated	
