= Klariza Clayton =

British actress and singer

- Born: 9 March 1989 (age 37); British Hong Kong
- Occupation: Actress
- Years active: 2007–present

Klariza L. Clayton (born 9 March 1989) is a British actress and singer. She is best known for her roles in the CBBC comedy Dani's House (2008–2012), the E4 drama Skins (2009–2010), the Nickelodeon series House of Anubis (2011–2013), and the Netflix sitcom Lovesick (2016–2018).

== Early life ==
Clayton was born in Hong Kong to an English father and a Filipino mother and grew up in South London.

== Career ==
Clayton began her career in 2007 with a brief role on the CBBC show Young Dracula as Delila. From 2008 to 2012, she played Sam on the comedy Dani's House, also on CBBC, as a series regular for the first four series and a guest star for the fifth series. In 2009, she landed a recurring role in the teen drama Skins as Karen McClair, the younger sister of Freddie McClair (Luke Pasqualino) and made her film debut with a minor role in Harry Brown. In 2011, Clayton began starring as Joy Mercer in the Nickelodeon mystery series House of Anubis, going on to appear in 141 episodes of the series.

From 2016 to 2018, Clayton appeared in the Netflix comedy-drama Lovesick as Holly. She starred in the horror films Fox Trap, Blood Money, and Suicide Club. In 2022 played main role in Paramount+ "The Flatshare (TV series)".

== Acting credits ==
=== Film ===
Year	Title	Role	Notes
2009	Harry Brown	Sharon	
2009	Drawn Out	Mumtaz	Short film
2016	Blood Money	Kasey	
2016	Fox Trap	Emma	
2017	Suicide Club	Liz	

=== Television ===
Year	Title	Role	Notes
2007	Young Dracula	Delila	Episode: "Love Bites"
2008	Holby City	Stevie Montague	Episode: "The Softest Music"
2008–2012	Dani's House	Sam	Main role (series 1–4); Guest (series 5)
2009	Parents of the Band	Jelly Babe	1 Episode
2009	EastEnders	Lian	2 Episode
2009–2010	Skins	Karen McClair	Recurring Role; cumulative 6 episodes
2010	The Bill	Yara Hanoush	Episode: "Great Responsibility"
2010	Shelfstackers	Alyssa	Main role; cumulative 6 episodes
2011–2013	House of Anubis	Joy Mercer	Recurring role (season 1); Main (seasons 2–3)
2011–2013	Anubis Unlocked	Herself	12 episodes
2013	House of Anubis: Touchstone of Ra	Joy Mercer	TV special
2013	Misfits	Chloe	1 Episode
2013	Dani's Castle	Sam	Episode: "Ghost Tour"
2014	Grass Roots	Denise	Series
2014	Hieroglyph	Zita	TV movie
2015	Sun Trap	Susie	Episode: "Look Who's Talking"
2016	BBC Comedy Feeds	Tilly	Episode: "Fail"
2016–2018	Lovesick	Holly	Recurring (series 2), main (series 3); 5 episodes
2019	London Kills	Alice Maguire	Episode: "Turf Wars"
2020	Bulletproof	Tara	1 episode
2020	Maxxx	Siren	Episode: "Sex, Love 'n' Lyrics"
2022	The Flatshare	Kay	

=== Theatre ===
Year	Title	Role	Notes
2019	Warheads	Tena	Park Theatre, London

=== Music videos ===
Year	Song	Artist	Notes
2013	"Nothing Without Love"	Max	
2021	"Panic"	Alex Sawyer	

=== Video games ===
Year	Title	Voice role	Notes
2019	Blood & Truth	Michelle Marks	
