= Andrew Traucki =

Australian film director

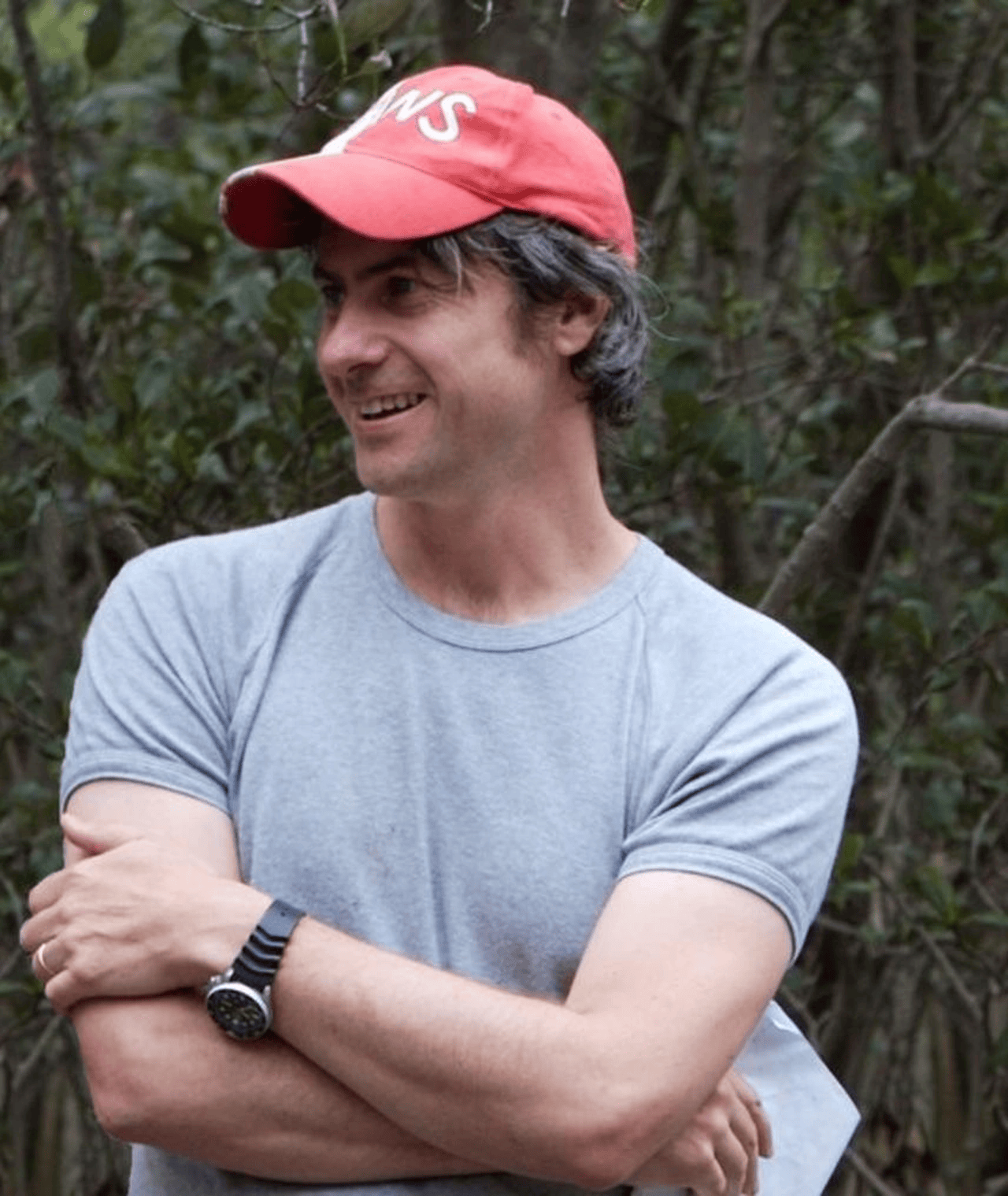
- Occupations: Film director, screenwriter, cinematographer
- Notable work: Black Water (2007); The Reef (2010); The Jungle (2013); Black Water Abyss (2020); The Reef: Stalked (2022)

Andrew Traucki is an Australian film producer, writer, and director. He is best known for directing the films Black Water (2007), The Reef (2010), The Jungle (2013), Black Water Abyss (2020), and The Reef: Stalked (2022).

== Early life and career ==
Traucki developed an early interest in film and photography during his twenties, which led him to pursue a career in the film industry.

Before becoming a feature filmmaker, Traucki was involved in a project of the reimagining of the 1950s radio play Rocky Star into a television series. Alongside Stephen Harrop and Steve Fearnley, Traucki edited 12 hours of radio play audio into 20 five-minute episodes. The series featured actors such as Kerry Fox lip-syncing to pre-recorded audio. Following this, Traucki worked at the Australian Film Commission (now Screen Australia), where he reviewed and assessed scripts.

Traucki's career as a filmmaker began with his debut feature film, Black Water (2007), which he co-wrote, co-directed, and co-produced. Following the success of Black Water, Traucki continued to explore survival thrillers with The Reef (2010), a film he wrote, directed, and co-produced. In 2012, Traucki wrote, directed, and co-produced The Jungle.

Traucki returned to the Black Water franchise with Black Water Abyss (2020), a spiritual sequel that he directed. The film centers on a group of friends exploring an underground river system, where they become trapped and pursued by unseen threats. Later in 2022, he wrote, directed, and co-produced the Reef Stalked, a sequel to The Reef that blends survival horror with themes of trauma and domestic violence.

A feature that distinguishes Traucki’s films is in his quest for realism. To help achieve this he uses real animals in his films, rather than 3D models or animatronics. Traucki's films create suspenseful and terrifying atmospheres, often utilizing natural settings and minimal dialogue to heighten the horror experience. His work delves into themes of survival, isolation, and the dangers posed by the natural world.

== Filmography ==
=== Feature films ===
Year	Title	Director	Producer	Writer	Notes
2007	Black Water	Yes	Yes	Yes	Debut feature film, survival thriller
2010	The Reef	Yes	Yes	Yes	Survival thriller, second feature film
2013	The Jungle	Yes	Yes	Yes	Third feature film, survival thriller
2020	Black Water Abyss	Yes	No	No	Spiritual sequel to Black Water, survival thriller
2022	The Reef Stalked	Yes	Yes	Yes	Sequel to The Reef, survival horror with themes of trauma and domestic violence
