= RIF =

RIF or Rif may refer to:

== Arts and entertainment ==
- Renju International Federation, Renju is the professional variant of the board game Gomoku
- R.I.F., a 2011 film
- Rock identitaire français, a nationalistic music genre
- Rif la Scyrus, fictional royal family member in the Japanese web manga Centuria

== Computing ==
- Requirements Interchange Format, XML file format that can be used to exchange requirements
- Routing information field, a source route-related field in the token ring network frame header
- Rule Interchange Format, a W3C recommendation-track effort
- Russian Internet Forum

== Military ==
- Reconnaissance in force, a type of military operation used specifically to probe an enemy's disposition
- Royal Inniskilling Fusiliers, an Irish line infantry regiment of the British Army in existence from 1881 until 1968
- The Royal Irish Fusiliers (Princess Victoria's), an infantry regiment of the British Army, raised in 1881
- Realistic imitation firearm, a replica that realistically portrays a firearm; see Legal issues in airsoft § United Kingdom
- R-39 Rif, Soviet and Russian submarine-launched ballistic missile

== People ==
- The Rif, Isaac Alfasi (1013–1103), Rabbi Isaac ben Jacob Alfasi (1013—1103), Talmudist and posek
- Riffian people, inhabitants of the Rif Region of Morocco

== Places ==
- Rif (sandbank), in the Netherlands
- Rif, a mountain chain and a region in Morocco
  - The Republic of the Rif, a short-lived republic in the region which fought against Spanish rule.
- Rif, Iceland, in the municipality of Snæfellsbær
  - Rif Airport, Iceland

== Science ==
- Retrieval-induced forgetting, a phenomenon in memory
- Rif (GTPase), small signalling G protein
- Rifampicin, an antibiotic
- Right iliac fossa, part of the surface of the human abdomen
- The initials on bars of soap purported to have been made of human fat in World War II
- Realgar/Indigo Naturalis Formula, a medication used in acute promyelocytic leukemia

== Other uses ==
- Reading Is Fundamental, an organization promoting children's literacy
- Reduction in force, a large-scale ending of employment
- Riff, a brief relaxed musical phrase repeated over changing melodies
- Riff languages, a grouping of languages spoken in the Rif area of Morocco

== See also ==
- Riff (disambiguation)
- Reef (disambiguation)
