= Merle Thornton =

Australian feminist activist and author (1930–2024)

Merle Thornton AM
- Born: Merle Estelle Wilson; 1930
- Died: 16 August 2024 (aged 93)
- Education: University of Sydney; University of Queensland
- Occupations: Activist; author; academic; screenwriter; playwright
- Children: Sigrid Thornton

Merle Estelle Thornton AM (1930 – 16 August 2024) was an Australian feminist activist, author and academic. She is best known for her 1965 action at the Regatta Hotel where she and Rosalie Bogner chained themselves to a bar rail to protest the ban on serving women drinks in public bars in Queensland, Australia.

Women's rights and social justice are threads linking Thornton's diverse range of pursuits and projects, including the 1965 founding of the Equal Opportunities Association for Women, helping establish the first Women's Studies course at the University of Queensland in 1973, and contributing to feminist and social theory literature.

In 2015, Thornton was awarded the Member of the Order of Australia for "her significant service to the community as an advocate for women, and Indigenous rights, and to the arts as a writer and director", as part of the 2015 Queen's Birthday Honours.

== Education ==
Thornton graduated with a Bachelor of Arts (Honours) from the University of Sydney in 1952 and studied philosophy as a post-graduate at the University of Queensland.

== Feminist activism and career ==
Thornton was involved in feminist activism beginning in the mid-1960s, including the notable Regatta Hotel protest in March 1965 that challenged women's exclusion from being served drinks in public bars in Queensland. In 1970 the law was changed to allow women to be served drinks in public bars in Queensland. In April of the same year, Thornton founded the Equal Opportunities for Women Association in Brisbane. As President of the association, Thornton led a successful campaign for the removal of the marriage bar in the Commonwealth Public Service of Australia. The end of the marriage bar was legislated in 1966.

From 1960 to 1980, Thornton worked as an academic in a variety of positions within philosophy, government, sociology and gender studies at the University of Queensland. During her time there, Thornton helped to establish the first women's studies course in Queensland in the UQ's Sociology Department in 1973.

== Regatta Hotel protest ==
In March 1965, Thornton and Rosalie Bogner chained themselves to the bar rail of the Regatta Hotel as a protest to the ban on serving women drinks in pubs in Queensland. The women were refused service as serving them liquor would have resulted in a fine for the pub. However, “sympathetic male patrons” brought them beer.

In Archiving the feminist self: reflections on the personal papers of Merle Thornton, Margaret Henderson notes that the protest “occurred four years before the first women’s liberation group met in Australia.” The protest marked the beginning of second wave feminist action in Brisbane and gained significant media coverage. Thornton and Bogner's protest, which addressed the public-private split for women, is recognised as a defining moment in the women's liberation movement in Australia. Kay Saunders notes, "when you use the term ‘‘second wave’’ it actually started in Brisbane."

Thornton stated, "What we did at the Regatta represented an idea whose time had come. It was the idea of ending the confinement of women to the private domestic world."

The public's reaction to the protest was mixed. Thornton received hate-mail letters accusing her of being a communist, questioning her mothering capabilities, and casting doubts on her morality.

In 1970 the law was changed to allow women to be served drinks in public bars in Queensland.

Thornton campaigned for women's issues throughout her life including demanding equal pay for women and removing the marriage bar for women in public service.

== Creative pursuits ==
Thornton has also achieved accomplishments as a screenwriter, playwright and author. Thornton's screenwriting appears on several episodes of the popular Australian television series Prisoner. Thornton's stage play, Playing Mothers and Fathers, had a successful season at the Carlton Courthouse in 1990.

In the 1980s and 1990s, Thornton served as Chair of Women in Film and Television and Victorian Chair of the Australian Writers’ Guild.

Thornton published her first novel, After Moonlight, in 2004.

Thornton also contributed in academics to the field of feminist and social theory. Thornton's later research interests included philosophy, the politics of the advancement of women, Aboriginal thought, and the education of Aboriginal Australians.

== Recognition ==
In 2014, the Regatta Hotel celebrated the protest by renaming the bar Merle's Bar.

In 2009 as part of the Q150 celebrations, the 1965 Regatta Hotel protest was announced as a “List of Queensland's Q150 Icons” under the category of a "Defining Moment" for Queensland.

A tunnel boring machine used in Queensland is named after her.

== Published works ==
- Thornton, Merle, "Sex equality is not enough for feminism", in Pateman, Carole and Gross, Elizabeths (eds), Feminist Challenges: Social and Political Theory, 1986, pp. 77–98.
- Thornton, Merle, After Moonlight, Interactive Press, Brisbane, 2004, 275 pp.
- Thornton, Merle, “Invisible Women Workers; Feminism, Consciousness and the Novel”, Overland, 182, Autumn, 2006, pp. 36–42.
- Thornton, Merle, “Our Chains: Rear View Reflections”, Queensland Review, Vol 14, No. 1, 2007, pp. 51–60.
- Thornton, Merle; Ostell, Melanie (2020). Merle Thornton: Bringing the Fight. HarperCollins. ISBN 978-1-4607-5832-8.

== Personal life and death ==
Merle Wilson married Neil Thornton in April 1953 in Sydney, New South Wales.

Merle Thornton was the mother of historian Harold Thornton and Australian film and television actress Sigrid Thornton.

Thornton died on 16 August 2024, at the age of 93.
