= Black Water: Abyss =

- Film poster
- Directed by: Andrew Traucki
- Written by: John Ridley; Sarah Smith
- Produced by: Pam Collis; Neal Kingston; Michael Robertson
- Starring: Jessica McNamee; Luke Mitchell; Amali Golden
- Cinematography: Damien Beebe
- Edited by: Scott Walmsley
- Music by: Michael Lira
- Production companies: Thrills & Spills
- Distributed by: R & R Films (Australia); Altitude Film Entertainment (International)
- Release date: 10 July 2020
- Running time: 98 minutes
- Country: Australia
- Language: English
- Box office: $1,123,693

Black Water: Abyss is a 2020 Australian horror film directed by Andrew Traucki. It is a standalone sequel to Black Water (2007). In the film, a group of friends venture in deep forests of Australia to explore a remote cave system. However, when a tropical storm hits and rising flood waters trap them deep below the surface, something even deadlier emerges from the darkness—a large killer crocodile. It was released on July 10, 2020.

== Plot ==
Two Japanese tourists get lost in an Australian forest and fall into a remote cave, where they are ambushed and killed by an unknown creature.

Five enthusiast explorers; Cash (Anthony Sharpe), Eric (Luke Mitchell), Jen (Jessica McNamee), Victor (Benjamin Hoetjes), and Yolanda (Amali Golden) go to check out the cave that Cash previously discovered. Cash brushes off a storm warning from the weather app and they continue on into the cave. They follow a tunnel down to an open lake. Unbeknownst to the group, it begins to rain and the cave begins to flood; soon, the path they came in through is submerged underwater. They begin to look for a way out but are unaware of the presence of the creature that killed the two Japanese tourists. Victor sees something in the water and leaves the group to retrieve it. He is attacked by the creature — revealed to be a massive saltwater crocodile — but survives with critical injuries. While the others stay behind, Cash and Eric leave to look for an exit back underwater through the tunnel they came through, only to find it blocked with rocks. They decide to go back and look for another way.

Back in the cave, Victor starts having a severe asthma attack, forcing Yolanda to get in the water and retrieve his inhaler where she has a close encounter with the beast. Eric's foot gets trapped between some rocks and he nearly drowns while Cash makes it back to the first tunnel, but is soon attacked and killed by the beast. Eric reaches the tunnel only to see Cash's headlight in the water. He returns to the group and informs them of Cash's death. Jen notices a breeze and goes to investigate, finding a previously unseen passage in the cave. Yolanda tells Victor that she is pregnant. The water continues to rise, bringing the beast closer to the group. Yolanda volunteers to go through the new tunnel to find a way out with Eric assisting her. On the way, she tells Eric that she is pregnant and reveals that the baby is his, and not Victor's.

The water back in the cave starts rising fast, forcing Jen and Victor to get to higher ground, even though it means going in the water. They make it to a ledge, but the beast attacks, forcing them to go higher. Yolanda and Eric fail to find an exit through the new tunnel, which is blocked by rocks and return to the group. Jen looks through Yolanda's camera and finds pictures of Eric and Yolanda on a night out. She sees a picture of the two looking lovingly at each other and gets upset. She leaves Victor on the high ledge to get something in the water but she cannot reach it. She decides to get into the water to get it. The beast starts swimming towards her. She panics and in her rush to get out of the water, she slips and knocks herself unconscious. Victor leaves the ledge to help her, but the beast leaps out of the water and drags Victor in, killing him. Jen races back up to the high ledge and cries. She spots a light under the water just as Eric and Yolanda return to the cave. Jen has to tell Yolanda that Victor has been killed.

Jen confronts Eric and Yolanda about their affair, and the two tell her that it was a mistake. They also confirm that the baby is Eric's and not Victor's. Once again, Jen notices the light and Eric realizes that water is getting sucked out through a tunnel and he believes it leads outside. Yolanda doesn't want to go, but Jen says she would rather take her chances than sit in the cave and wait to die. This convinces Yolanda to go. They all get in the water and swim for the tunnel. Soon enough, the beast starts swimming towards them. Eric splashes the water to distract it while the women escape. The beast grabs Eric and kills him. Swimming through the cave, Jen almost runs out of air but Yolanda grabs her arm and pulls her to safety. Realizing they are in the beast's hoarding lair, they follow the tunnel and find their way outside by the shore. They climb up a hill and come to a road where they soon find the car they came in. Yolanda tries to apologize to Jen, but she doesn't want to hear it.

The women drive down the road but a fallen tree forces Jen to swerve straight into the river and they begin to sink. As they realise they are in the same water they came out of, the beast reappears and attacks the car. Both women make it out and swim to shore but Yolanda can't swim quickly due to an ankle injury. Jen makes it to shore and turns to see Yolanda being stalked by the beast. She starts shooting at it, but it leaps out of the water and grabs her, dragging her under. Jen manages to escape and it is revealed that she killed the beast. They embrace and get out of the water to venture home.

== Cast ==
- Jessica McNamee as Jennifer
- Luke Mitchell as Eric
- Amali Golden as Yolanda
- Benjamin Hoetjes as Victor
- Anthony J. Sharpe as Cash

== Production ==
Black Water: Abyss was directed by Andrew Traucki, written by John Ridley and Sarah Smith and produced by Neal Kingston, Michael Robertson and Pam Collis with executive producers Jack Christian and Christopher Figg, and a standalone sequel to Black Water (2007).

It was a Screen Media release of a Piccadilly Pictures presentation, made in association with SQN, Screen Queensland, Altitude Film Entertainment, of a Thrills & Spills production.

== Release ==
The film was released in Australian cinemas on 10 July 2020, Australian distribution was through R & R Films, while international distribution was handled by Altitude.

== Reception ==
Reviews were generally less than glowing, although one reviewer praised its "effective, admirable simplicity", saying "When it's not digging into thin relationship drama, it maintains a confident, claustrophobic nihilism", and another calling it "decently scary".
