= The Best of Friends (film) =

1982 film by Michael Robertson

- Film poster
- Directed by: Michael Robertson
- Written by: Donald MacDonald
- Produced by: Tom Jeffrey
- Starring: Graeme Blundell; Angela Punch McGregor; Ruth Cracknell; Mark Lee
- Release date: 1982
- Country: Australia
- Language: English

The Best of Friends is a 1982 Australian romantic comedy about two best friends who have an affair one night, resulting in the woman becoming pregnant.

== Cast ==
- Graeme Blundell as Tom
- Angela Punch McGregor as Melanie
- Ruth Cracknell as Iris
- Mark Lee as Bruce
- Serge Lazareff as Colin
- Henri Szeps as Lilo
- Les Foxcroft as Mr Malone
- Moya O'Sullivan as Mrs Malone

== Production ==
The script won $10,000 in a competition by the New South Wales Film Corporation for best original quality. Neville Wran presented the writer and director with the cheque.

Angela Punch McGregor later claimed that:

It was an excellent script. It was then mutilated by all of us. [Writer] Donald McDonald was very upset about it. The film was badly handled and I was miscast but I took it because I wanted the challenge of doing a comedy, which I hadn't done before. I thought my role was well written and wasn't cardboard... The director wasn't up to it, the film was miscast, the budget wasn't good.

== Reception ==
Susie Eisenhuth in the Sun-Herald gave it 2 stars saying "Like so much Australian comedy, when the subject is sex, the script never chooses to laugh when it can snigger instead." Geraldine Brooks of the Sydney Morning Herald writes "As a comedy, The Best of Friends makes a great tragedy." and notes "brides at altars. If there is one new idea in The Best of Friends, it must be suffering from acute loneliness." The Age's Neil Jillett says that director Michael Robertson "shows no apparent control over Angela Punch McGregor and Graeme Blundell (Melanie and Tom) as they smirk, squawk, sneer and snigger their way to the film's predictable final scene, which is a very long time a'coming." Writing in the Canberra Times Dougal McDonald remarks "if one takes the film as a homage to the cliche, it works very well indeed" and says "If there was a laugh in all of it that wasn't triggered by early warning systems, the film might offer some genuine mirth."

Commenting in the Sydney Morning Herald about an abundance of water gags Richard Glover jokes "We know we are in for good laughs when the denouement of the movie is set on a harbourside beach. Cor, there it is before us – billions of litres of screamingly funny water, packed full of comic potential."

The Sydney Morning Herald's Anna Maria Dell'oso says it "is a tedious but sometimes mildly funny exploration of the distinction between friends and lovers and all the grey areas in between."
