= Riff (disambiguation) =

A riff is an example of ostinato, a short, repeated musical phrase.

Riff, RIFF, The Riff, or Riffs may also refer to:

== Acronyms ==
=== Film festivals ===
- Reykjavík International Film Festival, Iceland
- Riga International Film Festival, Latvia
- Riverside International Film Festival, California, U.S.
- Riviera International Film Festival, Italy
- Rome Independent Film Festival, Italy

=== Other acronyms ===
- Rajasthan International Folk Festival, a music and arts festival in Jodhpur, India
- Resource Interchange File Format, a file container format for storing data

== Fictional characters ==
- Riff, a character in Allegra's Window
- Riff (dinosaur), on Barney & Friends, a supporting character from 2006 to 2018
- Riff Randle, protagonist of the Ramones film Rock 'n' Roll High School
- Riff (Sluggy Freelance)
- The Riffs, a gang in the film The Warriors
- Riff, the leader of the Jets in West Side Story

== Music ==
- Riff (American band), a 1980s–1990s R&B a cappella group
- The Riffs, American punk rock band
- Riff (Argentine band) a hard rock band
- "The Riff Song", a musical number from The Desert Song
- Riffs (Jimmy Lyons album)
- "The Riff" (Lordi song), 2013
- Riffs (Status Quo album), 2003
- "Riff", a song by Sander van Doorn from the album Supernaturalistic

== Media ==
- The Riff, an Australian music video television show
- Riff: Everyday Shooter, a 2007 video game
- "The Riff", a name for WRIF, a radio station in Detroit, Michigan, US

== See also ==
- RIF (disambiguation)
- Rif, a region of Morocco
- Riffian people, a Berber people of the Rif
- MSTing, or "riffing", a form of humorous media commentary
  - RiffTrax, a company that produces such humor
