= Amali Golden =

Australian actress

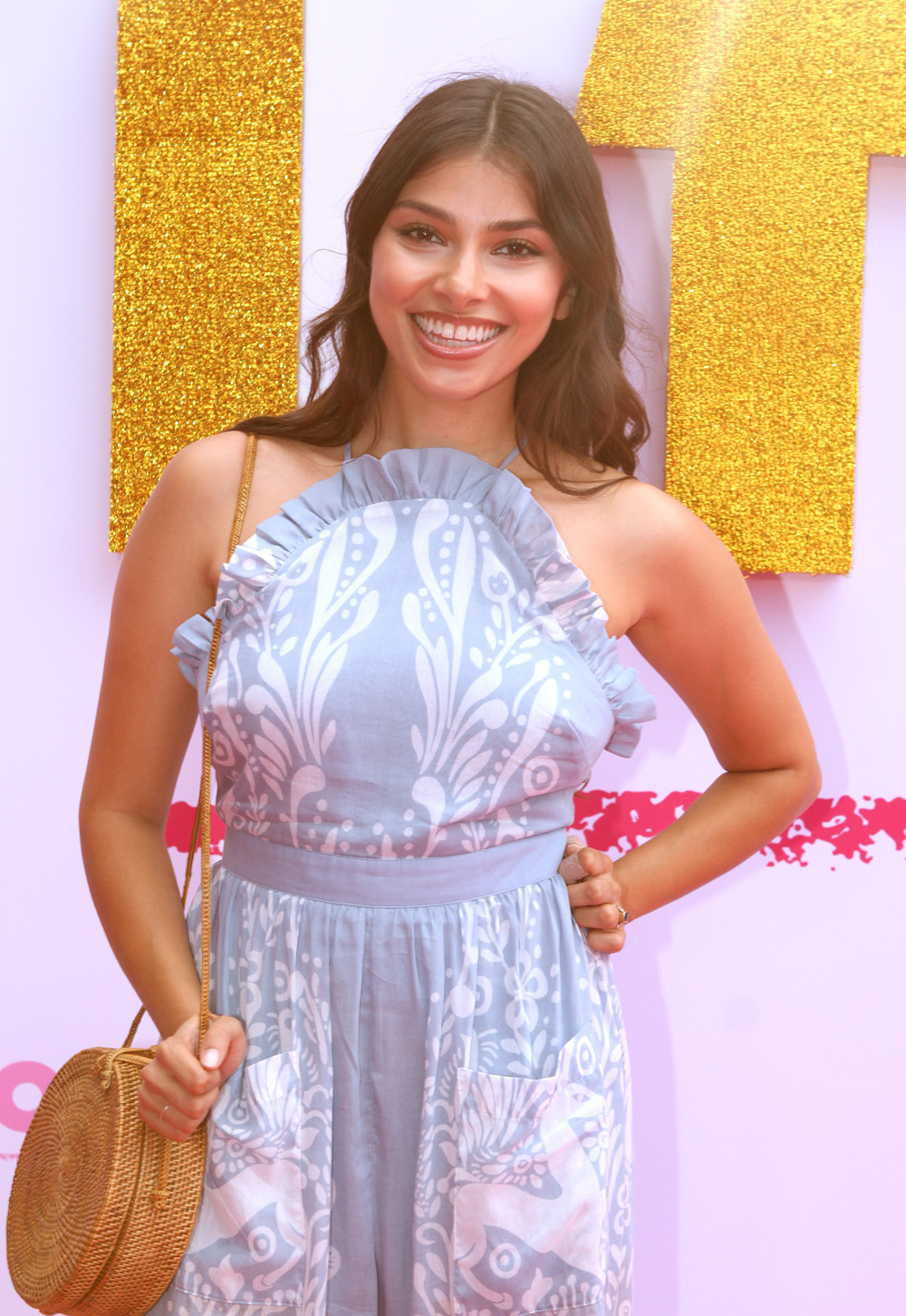
- Golden in 2018.
- Born: Amali Ward; 1988 or 1989 (age 37–38); New Town, Tasmania, Australia
- Occupations: Actress, singer-songwriter
- Years active: 2004–present
- Spouse: Beau Golden (m. 2015)
- Children: 2

Amali Golden (née Ward) is an Australian singer-songwriter and actress. She came to prominence as a contestant on the second season of Australian Idol when she was 16 years old. She made it to the top 12, before being eliminated in tenth place. Post-Idol, she decided against signing with a record label and instead finished school. Golden worked as a session vocalist and keyboard player, and released her self-produced EP Amali Ward in 2007. This was followed by her debut album Back In Time in 2013, which was recorded in Los Angeles. That same year, Golden made her acting debut in the soap opera Neighbours. In 2014, she appeared on the sixth season of The X Factor Australia and made it to the final 24. She then undertook a year long course at the National Institute of Dramatic Art (NIDA).

In 2017, Golden appeared in episodes of Home and Away and The Other Guy, and the feature film Thor: Ragnarok. Golden also released the single "Elephant (Talk About It)" after the track was created for her role as Amy in The Other Guy. From 2019 until 2020, Golden played Young Farida in the drama series Bloom. She also launched new music under the name GOLDS and her debut EP Imprints was released in November 2019. The following year, she appeared in the feature films Love and Monsters and Black Water: Abyss. She also played real life medic Priya Thalayasingam in Bali 2002 and returned to Home and Away as Mercedes Da Silva in 2023. She joined the supporting cast of crime drama Black Snow in 2025.

== Early and personal life ==
Golden is from New Town, Tasmania. Her Sri Lankan mother is a radiographer, and her English father Dr John Ward was a radiation oncologist. Her brother Jamie Ward competed on the seventh series of MasterChef Australia. Golden attended The Friends' School, and she thought she would go into law or medicine, however, her time on Australian Idol led her to realise that a career in music and drama was achievable. While appearing on Australian Idol, Golden lived at home with her parents in Hobart. She moved to Sydney when she was 17. Golden has a degree in internet communications.

She married music producer and director Beau Golden in 2015, after meeting while song writing with a mutual friend. The couple have a home studio where they make music together. They have two children.

== Career ==
=== Music ===
==== 2004–2013: Australian Idol and Back In Time ====
Golden, then Ward, was a contestant on the second season of Australian Idol. She was 16 years old and still at school when she auditioned for the show. Golden became known for being "the shy, slightly awkward teen". She made it to the top 12 and the live shows, before being eliminated in tenth place on 20 September 2004. Golden decided not to sign with any of the labels interested in her, as she felt they wanted her to be a different type of artist to the one she wanted to be. She chose to finish school and work out what she wanted to do first.

Golden went on to work as a session vocalist and keyboard player for various acts, including Dua Lipa, Charli XCX, Craig David and Missy Higgins. She released her self-produced EP Amali Ward in 2007, before playing a number of festivals such as the East Coast Blues & Roots Music Festival. Golden was a support act for Seal during the Sydney leg of his 2012 tour.

Golden released her debut album Back In Time in 2013 under her own label. It was recorded in Los Angeles and produced by David Ryan Harris, who previously worked with Australian singer Guy Sebastian. It also features some members of John Mayer's touring band. Golden stated that the album was about "things that have happened to me or things that are important to me. I try to write about things other than just love songs and stuff... I don't know what I could add to what's already been said by so many other people." Back In Time was preceded by the singles "Leave Me Alone" and "Knock You Out", which won the 2011 John Lennon Songwriting Contest Award in the R&B category. She also won the UTAS Stephen Schwartz Songwriting Award at the 2013 APRA Professional Development Awards. Golden toured the album around Australian and was chosen by Brian Ritchie of the Violent Femmes to perform at the Museum of Old and New Art in Hobart.

==== 2014–present: The X Factor and GOLDS ====
In 2014, Golden appeared on the sixth season of The X Factor Australia. She was part of the Over 25s mentored by Redfoo. She made it to the final 24, before being eliminated.

Golden released the R&B track "Elephant (Talk About It)" in 2017. The song was created for her role as musician Amy in The Other Guy. It was co-written and produced by her husband Beau Golden. "Elephant (Talk About It)" touches on the issue of isolation in a relationship. Golden commented "This was the first time I've written a song in character, and it was strangely freeing. Even though it was based on a character, the concept of two people in a relationship avoiding a dreaded conversation they know they need to have is pretty universal."

In March 2019, Golden released the single "Broken Wing" under the name GOLDS. Of her new project, Golden stated: "It's fun to do something with a new name. It has given me a lot of freedom to put something out with no preconceived notions from anyone who listens to it." Her second single "Don't Care" was released in June 2019. Toby Bryant of CelebMix described it as "electropop" with an "R&B influenced production". Both tracks were co-written and produced by Golden's husband Beau Golden. GOLDS's debut EP Imprints was released on 29 November 2019.

=== Acting ===
Golden admitted that she had wanted to pursue an acting career before her appearance on Australian Idol. She made her acting debut in the Australian soap opera Neighbours in October 2013. During the guest stint, in which she played herself, she performed a song written especially for the storyline, which she said was fun because it was not her "usual style". She also made a number of appearance in television commercials, including for the brands Rexona, Lipton Tea, and Mazda. Golden completed a year long course at the National Institute of Dramatic Art (NIDA) in 2015. She acquired an acting coach and attended private acting classes.

In 2017, Golden appeared in an episode of comedy series The Other Guy and she had small roles in soap opera Home and Away and the superhero film Thor: Ragnarok. This was followed by roles in Harrow and Bondi Slayer. Golden then spent a month in Los Angeles auditioning for roles as part of pilot season. From 2019 until 2020, she played Young Farida in the Stan drama series Bloom. For her performance in the series, Golden was included on the longlist for the Logie Award for Most Popular New Talent. She makes an appearance in the 2020 sci-fi horror The Invisible Man, however, her scenes were cut from the final film and later released on Blu-Ray.

In 2020, Golden appeared in the feature films Love and Monsters, originally titled Monster Problems, and Black Water: Abyss. She then guested in the ABC TV drama Wakefield and the American science fiction drama La Brea. In 2022, Golden played real life medic Priya Thalayasingam in the four-part series Bali 2002, which tells the story of the 2002 Bali bombings. Golden returned to Home and Away in 2023 as violinist Mercedes Da Silva, who helps the show's fictional band Lyrik record an album. She joined the supporting cast of crime drama Black Snow for its second season, which aired in 2025.

== Discography ==
=== Amali Golden ===
==== Studio albums ====
Title	Details
Back In Time	Released: 3 May 2013; Label: Precious Records (13); Formats: CD

==== Extended plays ====
Title	EP details
Amali Ward	Released: 7 November 2007; Label: Amali Ward; Formats: CD

==== Singles ====
Year	Single	Chart positions
Year	Single	AUS
2012	"Leave Me Alone"	—
2013	"Knock You Out"	—
2017	"Elephant (Talk About It)"	—
"—" denotes releases that did not chart or receive certification

=== GOLDS ===
==== Extended plays ====
Title	EP details
Imprints	Released: 29 November 2019; Label: Formats: Digital download

==== Singles ====
Year	Single	Chart positions
Year	Single	AUS
2019	"Broken Wing"	—
2019	"Don't Care"	—
"—" denotes releases that did not chart or receive certification

== Filmography ==
Year	Title	Role	Notes
2004	Australian Idol	Herself	Top 12 finalist
2011–2012	Save Point	Co-host	
2013	Neighbours	Herself	Guest
2014	The X Factor Australia	Herself	Top 24
2017	Home and Away	Felicity Cox	Guest
2017	The Other Guy	Amy Wade	Episode: "The Dots"
2017	Thor: Ragnarok	Asgardian Date #2	Feature film
2017	The Auditions	Skye Silva	Episode: "Baz Luhrmann's Pride and Prejudice"
2019	Harrow	Sherry Diallo	Episode: "Abo Imo Pectore"
2019	Motown Magic	Harmony the Cat (singing voice)	Episode: "Superstition"
2019–2020	Bloom	Young Farida	Recurring
2020	The Invisible Man	Annie	Uncredited
2020	Bondi Slayer	Liv	Episodes: "Drag Queens and Slay Queens", "Home and a Slay"
2020	Black Water: Abyss	Yolanda	Feature film
2020	Love and Monsters	Ava	Feature film
2021	Wakefield	Nadia	Miniseries
2022	Bali 2002	Priya	Episodes: "From the Ashes", "Operation Alliance"
2023	La Brea	Catherine	Episodes: "The Journey, Parts 1 & 2"
2023	Home and Away	Mercedes Da Silva	Recurring
2025	Black Snow	Gita Jacobs	Recurring
