= Slant (film) =

Australian feature film from 2022

- Slant Theatrical Poster
- Directed by: James Vinson
- Written by: Michael Nikou
- Produced by: Monique Fisher; Michael Nikou; James Vinson; Alexandros Ouzas; Tessa Mansfield-Hung
- Starring: Elle Mandalis; Kate Lister; Michael Nikou; Ra Chapman; Ryan A. Murphy; Shannon Berry; Neil Pigot; Petra Yared; Alexis Porter; Pia Miranda; Sigrid Thornton
- Cinematography: Amy Dellar
- Music by: Nicholas Buc; Albert Salt
- Production companies: Bim Bim Films; Exile Entertainment
- Distributed by: Bim Bim Films
- Release dates: 4 December 2022 (Monster Fest); 12 October 2023 (Australia)
- Running time: 112 minutes
- Country: Australia
- Language: English
- Budget: $1m AUD
- Box office: $63,159 AUD

Slant is a 2022 independent Australian dark comedy thriller film written by Michael Nikou and directed by James Vinson. The film stars Australian screen veterans Sigrid Thornton and Pia Miranda as part of an ensemble cast.

== Plot ==
In Melbourne circa 1999, a career crazed journalist (Derek Verity) is tasked with writing his first exposé on an infamous missing socialite. When a dark family secret of his own threatens to destabilise his career and a workplace rival vies to steal the golden ticket story out from under him, Derek goes rogue in an attempt to get the scoop at all costs.

== Cast ==
- Michael Nikou as Derek Verity
- Sigrid Thornton as Vivianne Verity
- Elena Mandalis (Elle) as Kaye Kopoulos
- Ryan A. Murphy as Billy Verity
- Ra Chapman as Olyvia
- Kate Lister as Una Power
- Shannon Berry as Samantha McGowan
- Pia Miranda as Maggie Kopoulos
- Petra Yared as Elizabeth McGowan
- Neil Pigot as Martin McGowan
- Alexis Porter as Coco

== Release ==
Slant premiered on December 4, 2022 at Monster Fest where it went on to win the award for Best Australian Feature. The cast and key creatives behind Slant went on a national press tour which included visiting every Australian capital city for special Q&A screenings. The press tour started in Sydney with the unveiling of Sigrid Thornton's plaque on the Australian Film Walk of Fame outside the Ritz Cinema, Randwick on July 26 and concluded in Darwin on August 5 at the Deckchair Cinema. Due to the success of the press tour Slant was then released in cinemas across every Australian state capital and some regional areas for a full theatrical season on October 12, 2023.

It received its UK premiere on 22 September 2023 at the Garden Cinema in London, as part of the London Australian Film Festival.

The Australian public broadcaster, SBS has since made the film available for all Australian households on its On Demand service.

== Reception ==
Slant received positive reviews from audiences and critics. Stephen Romei of The Australian stating in his review: "Slant is original, funny, pulpy and a little loopy." FilmFreeway described it as “a larger-than-life black comedy thriller with a sizzling build to a wild finale; full of 90s nostalgia, irreverent humour, relatable family drama, and shocking twists you won’t see coming”

The film also won Best Australian Feature at Monster Fest, an annual film festival held in Melbourne that is dedicated to cult and horror cinema. It is supported by the federal screen agency, Screen Australia.
