= Patrick School of the Arts =

Dance school in Melbourne, AUS

Coordinates: 37°51′6.4″S 144°59′30.5″E

- Former name: Patrick Studios Australia
- Type: Tertiary Performing Arts Institution
- Established: 2005; 21 years ago
- Founder: Todd Patrick
- Location: Level 2/140 High St, Melbourne, Victoria
- Website: https://www.psarts.com.au

Patrick School of the Arts (also known as PSA, previously Patrick Studios Australia), is an Australian independent tertiary education provider based in Windsor, Victoria. It offers both part-time and full-time education and training for the Performing Arts.

Attached to the university is specialist high school 'Patrick Arts High - High School for the Performing Arts', which offers secondary education for students in Year 7-12. This is a full-time program that splits teaching traditional subjects with performing arts and elite dance training.

== History ==
Originally established as Patrick Studios Australia, Patrick School of the Arts was founded by Todd Patrick in 2005.

Since 2011, Patricks has worked closely with the Swinburne University of Technology to deliver nationally accredited VET courses through the schools offered programs.

In 2026, Patrick School of the Arts will be switching RTO's to Ausdance VIC, who will offer Certificate III's in Dance and/or Musical Theatre and will offer both accredited and non-accredited courses.

== Courses ==
Patricks offers both Musical Theatre and Performing Arts programs. Courses offered at Patricks include Tertiary Dance, Tertiary Performing Arts, and Tertiary Musical Theatre. The Musical Theatre program is a three year performing arts program focused equally on acting, dancing, and singing.

The dance styles offered include: Classical Ballet, Jazz, Tap, Musical Theatre, Contemporary, Hip-Hop, Acrobatics. These courses also offer singing and vocal lessons at further costs. Additionally, Musical Theatre courses offer Accent and Dialect coaching.

Patricks also offers courses in VET Dance to be completed along with Year 11 and 12. This is offered as a VCE course as well and students receive a Certificate II upon completion.

Dance Teaching and Management is also offered at Patricks, which provides a Certificate IV upon completion.

Guest lecturers include professionals such as Jacob Yarr, Stephen Tannos, Kirsten King and Yvette Lee

The high school was founded in 2014. The typical curriculum is offered online by Virtual School Victoria, while the rest of the performing arts education happens on campus. It offers both a regular Arts High School program, and a Junior Elite Program. The Junior Elite Program is an after-school extension on the offered course, with a focus on developing talent further.

== Alumni ==
Notable alumni of the school include:

- Julian Ardley - Successful model and Dance Captain in the boy’s line at the ‘L’ido de Paris’, in France.
- Kate Lister - Award winning actress and producer known for Apple Cider Vinegar, The Heights, 7 Storeys Down, and Drive Me to the End.
- Adam Noviello - Actor and Songwriter known for Hedwig and the Angry Inch, Matilda, Charlie and the Chocolate Factory, and Cabaret credits.
- Alex Given - Actor known for Offspring (TV series), The Wrong Girl. As well as theatre credits in West Side Story, Anything Goes, and The Book of Mormon (musical).
- Taylor Scanlan - Actor and gymnast known for being Dance Captain in Beetlejuice and Cats. He was also part of Omega Gymnastics' National Australian Team.
- Melanie Hawkins - Actress known for Wicked (musical), King Kong Live On Stage, and being Dance Captain in Oklahoma!
- Nick Len - Actor and hip-hop dancer known for being the youngest musical director on the West End. He is also known for Mamma Mia! Here We Go Again, and the 2012 season of The Voice.
- Karli Dinardo - Actress known for understudying Peggy Schuyler & Maria Reynolds, as well as being Dance Captain on Hamilton's national tour, as well as her work on West Side Story and Moulin Rouge! (musical).
- Nick Phillips - Hip-Hop dancer and Actor known for supporting Britney Spears and Kylie Minogue, as well as appearing in the Magic Mike musical.
- Samantha Dodemaide - Award winning actress known for her work on Singin' in the Rain, Anything Goes, and Sweet Charity.
- Sophia Laryea - Dancer and Model known for Thor: Ragnarok, Australia's Got Talent and dancing for Jessica Mauboy, Timomatic, and Pnau.
- Elandrah Eramiha - Dancer and Singer known for her lead role in Memphis, as well as Bring It On, Aladdin, and Kiss of the Spiderwoman.
- Euan Fistrovic-Doidge - Actor known for Saturday Night Fever, Les Misérables, and Joseph and the Amazing Technicolor Dreamcoat.

== Staff ==
Notable staff of the school have included:

- Todd Patrick - Choreographer and dancer known for his work with Disney, Versace, Dior, and other high fashion companies. He has danced for Vanessa Amorosi, Guy Sebastian, and Dannii Minogue. He is also widely known for founding Patrick School of the Arts.
- Amanda Stone - Choreographer who is known for her work with Walt Disney Studios, Nickelodeon, HIT Entertainment, and Kylie Minogue. She also runs her own company, 'Stone Productions Australia'.
- David Wisken - Vocal coach, music and artistic director known for his work with the National Institute of Circus Arts, as well as his directorial efforts on Sondheim on Sondheim, City of Angels, and Children of Eden.
- Anna Burgess - Actress and Acting Coach known for her lead role in Much Ado About Nothing for the Australian Shakespeare Company, as well as her work with Adelaide Fringe Festival, and various Shakespeare productions. She was also involved in Neighbours, Thank God You're Here and, Any Questions for Ben?.
- Jan Di Pietro - Playwright, Actor in Theatre, Film and TV known for Muriel's Wedding, Utopia (Australian TV series). He has devised works for large-scale sporting events such as the AFL, and Australian Open.
- Katrina Bickerton - Actress known for Mary Poppins, Saturday Night Fever, Legally Blonde, and The Wedding Singer.
