= Reef (disambiguation) =

A reef is a bar of rock, sand, coral or similar material, lying beneath the surface of water.

Reef may also refer to:

== Earth science ==
- Coral reef, a type of reef that is formed by coral
- Gold reef, a synonym for a gold vein

== Places ==
- Recife (Portuguese for "reef"), capital of the Brazilian state of Pernambuco
- Reef (Scottish Gaelic: Riof), a small village in Uig, Lewis, Scotland

== People ==
- Reef the Lost Cauze, an American rapper

== Arts, entertainment, and media ==
- Reef (band), a British band
- Reef (novel), a 1994 novel written by Romesh Gunesekera

== Other uses ==
- Reef (company), an American apparel and shoe company
- Reef knot, a kind of knot
- Reefing, an action performed on sails to reduce the area on which the wind can act

== See also ==
- The Reef (disambiguation)
- Wreath
