= Fox Trap =

- Directed by: Jamie Weston
- Written by: Jeffrey Cohen
- Starring: Becky Fletcher; Klariza Clayton; Alex Sawyer; Kate Greer First Assistant director: Shelley Lankovits
- Release date: 30 October 2016
- Country: United Kingdom
- Language: English

Fox Trap is a 2016 British horror film directed by Jamie Weston.

== Plot ==
Years after an accident that leaves a young teenage girl disabled, the group of friends who were responsible meet at a remote manor in the countryside for a class reunion where they are targeted by a masked killer hellbent on revenge.

== Cast ==
- Becky Fletcher as Frankie Hollingsway
- Klariza Clayton as Emma
- Alex Sawyer as Niall
- Kate Lister as Connie
- Therica Wilson-Read as Anna
- Julia Eringer as Dina
- Carey Thring as Ray
- Richard Summers-Calvert as Josh
- Tara MacGowran as Miss Johnson
- Georgina Dugdale as Lorraine Mayfield
- Shelley Lankovits as Jess
- Charlene Cooper as Ali
- Tony Manders as Inspector Davies
