= Michael Robertson (filmmaker) =

Australian film director and producer

Michael Robertson is an Australian film director and producer.

== Select credits ==
- The Reef: Stalked (2022) – Producer, Second Unit Director
- Great White (2021) – Producer
- Black Water: Abyss (2020) – Producer
- The Pack (2015) – Producer
- Inner Demon (2014) – Executive Producer
- Road Train (2010) – Producer
- The Reef (2010) – Producer
- Black Water (2007) – Producer
- Back of Beyond (1995) – Director
- Going Sane (1985) – Director
- The Best of Friends (1982) – Director
