= Sigrid Thornton =

Australian actress (born 1959)

Sigrid Thornton AO
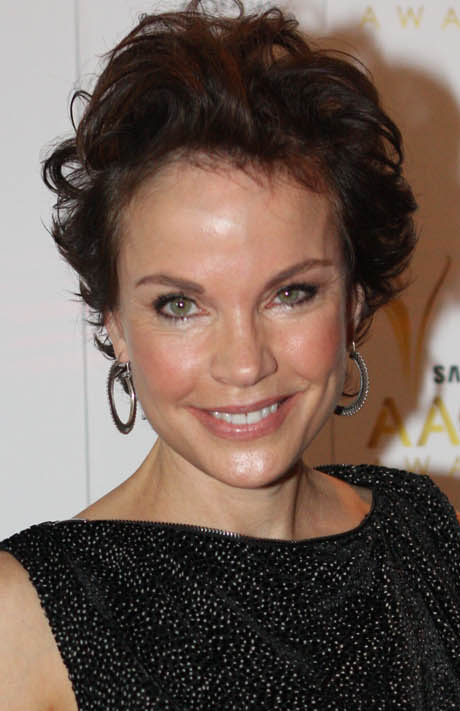
- Thornton in 2012
- Born: Sigrid Madeline Thornton; 12 February 1959 (age 67); Canberra, Australia
- Education: St Peters Lutheran College, Brisbane
- Occupation: Stage and screen actress
- Years active: 1973–present
- Spouse: Tom Burstall (1981–present)
- Children: 2
- Family: Merle Thornton (mother); Neil Thornton (father)

Sigrid Madeline Thornton AO (born 12 February 1959) is an Australian film and television actress. Her television work includes Prisoner (1979–80), All the Rivers Run (1983), SeaChange (1998–2019) and Wentworth (2016–18). She also starred in the American Western series Paradise (1988–91). Her film appearances include Snapshot (1979), The Man from Snowy River (1982), Street Hero (1984) and Face to Face (2011). She won the AACTA Award for Best Guest or Supporting Actress in a Television Drama for the 2015 miniseries Peter Allen: Not the Boy Next Door.

== Early life ==
Thornton was born in Canberra, the daughter of Merle, an academic and writer, and Neil Thornton, an academic. She was raised in Brisbane, attending St Peters Lutheran College. For two years, from the age of seven, she lived in London, where she was a member of the Unicorn Theatre. She was bullied for her Australian accent in her time there.

After the family's return to Brisbane, the family participated in an Anti-Vietnam war demonstration, leading to their arrest. She attended Twelfth Night Theatre Junior Workshop and in 1970, at the age of 11 and during the Captain Cook Bicentenary Celebrations, Thornton appeared before Queen Elizabeth II as Rosa Campbell-Praed in Looking Glass on Yesterday. She was a student of noted theatre director, Joan Whalley.

== Career ==
=== Film and television ===
Through Twelfth Night Theatre, Thornton auditioned for Melbourne based Crawford Productions who at the time, were scouting for talent interstate. She scored her guest professional job very soon afterwards at the age of 13, on Homicide. From there, the director recommended her for a guest part on Division 4. She also guested on Matlock Police and Bluey, before accepting a recurring role on The Sullivans as Elizabeth 'Buffy' Turnbull in 1977. She studied drama briefly at university, before moving to Sydney and then Melbourne to pursue her acting career, after deciding to learn her craft on the job.

Thornton made her film debut as Wendy in the 1977 coming-of-age film The FJ Holden, directed by Michael Thornhill, and in the same year as Maria in the film adaptation of Henry Handel Richardson's colonial Australian novel, The Getting of Wisdom, directed by Bruce Beresford. In 1978, Thornton appeared in the Australian television sequel of the British comedy series Father, Dear Father in Australia and Cop Shop. The same year, she played Angela in the horror film Snapshot (aka The Day After Halloween) directed by Simon Wincer, for which she was nominated for the 1979 Australian Film Institute Award for Best Actress in a Feature Film.

In 1980, Thornton appeared in a recurring role as Roslyn Coulson in the Australian television drama Prisoner (known overseas as Prisoner: Cell Block H). She also starred in 1981 film Duet for Four.

Thornton took on her breakthrough role of Jessica Harrison in the 1982 classic period film The Man from Snowy River opposite Tom Burlinson, making her a household name in Australia. She also starred as Frances in 1982 World War I miniseries 1915, and as Gloria in 1983 drama film Street Hero, alongside Vince Colosimo.

Thornton had a starring role in the 1984 historical miniseries All the Rivers Run, based on the 1958 novel of the same name by Nancy Cato. It was internationally successful, and earned her her first best actress Logie Award. That same year, she starred in the miniseries The Boy in the Bush opposite Kenneth Branagh.

1986 saw Thornton appear in war film The Lighthorsemen, the TV adaptation of Nevil Shute's novel The Far Country, with Gary Sweet, Peter Phelps and Jon Blake. The same year, she appeared in period drama miniseries Great Expectations: The Untold Story, upon which she also served as Associate Producer. In 1987, she starred opposite Michael York in the miniseries The Far Country, based on the novel of the same name by Nevil Shute, and the film Slate, Wyn & Me as school teacher Blanche McBride, opposite Martin Sacks and Simon Burke.

In 1988, Thornton starred once again as Jessica in The Man from Snowy River II, the sequel to the original film. A syndication of All the Rivers Run, The Man from Snowy River and The Man from Snowy River II brought her to a wider international audience, and she became the first Australian actress to be offered a lead role in a US network prime time drama series, Paradise, appearing as Amelia Lawson from 1988 to 1991. The role won her a Western Heritage Cowboy Hall of Fame award in 1999.

In 1992, Thornton starred in the film Over the Hill directed by George T. Miller and co-starring Olympia Dukakis. In 1996, she appeared in Love in Ambush directed by Carl Schultz.

Thornton starred in the Australian television series SeaChange from 1998 to 2000, as Laura Joy Gibson, alongside David Wenham and Tom Long. She was made to audition four times before she was cast. The role won her a 2000 Logie Award for Most Outstanding Actress.

Thornton played Susan in 2002 Australian thriller The Pact opposite Peter O’Brien, Robert Mammone and Essie Davis. In 2003, she appeared in Mittens directed by Emma Freeman. In 2004, she played a geneticist in a four-episode arc on legal drama MDA. She shaved her head for her role as ovarian cancer-stricken artist, Lola in the 2005 telemovie Little Oberon. The following year, she hosted the Nine Network's Logie Award-winning 2006 health and lifestyle program What's Good For You.

In 2010, Thornton appeared in the third series of the Underbelly franchise, Underbelly: The Golden Mile, as recurring character Gerry Lloyd, an Australian Federal Police detective and investigator for the Wood Royal Commission. She then starred alongside Vince Colosimo and Matthew Newton in Face to Face, an independent 2011 Australian film directed by Michael Rymer, based on the David Williamson play of the same name.

Thornton participated a 2012 episode of genealogy documentary series Who Do You Think You Are, tracing her family's origins, including their political activism. In 2014, she appeared in Netflix series The Code.

In 2016, Thornton appeared in the fourth season of SoHo drama series Wentworth for seven episodes, as a special guest star. She portrayed the character of Sonia Stevens (initially played by Tina Bursill in Prisoner), a woman on remand for the suspected murder of her best friend. She returned for season 5 as a main cast member, and served as the main antagonist in season 6, until her character's death in episode 7, "The Edge". That same year, she starred in the 2016 miniseries Peter Allen: Not the Boy Next Door, winning her the AACTA Award for Best Supporting Actress for her portrayal of Judy Garland.

Thornton was the subject of an episode Anh's Brush with Fame, in 2018, recounting intimate stories of her life, while sitting for a portrait session by actor, comedian and author Anh Do.

The series SeaChange was rebooted in 2019, in which Thornton resumed her role as Laura Gibson, and also served as Executive Producer. The series picked up 20 years after the original, and starred Brooke Satchwell as Laura's grown daughter. It topped the ratings with its debut episode.

In 2020, Thornton narrated the women's liberation documentary feature Brazen Hussies, also appearing via secretly filmed footage shot by ASIO, when as a teenager she demonstrated against the South African Springbok tour. In 2021, she appeared in Channel 9 drama, Amazing Grace.

Thornton starred in 2022 independent Australian dark comedy thriller Slant, alongside Pia Miranda. Critics praised her role as 'career best'. From 2024 to 2025, she appeared in several episodes of light-hearted detective series Darby and Joan, opposite Bryan Brown and Greta Scacchi, playing the supporting role of Miranda McNeill, Brown's character's wife.

Thornton appeared as a contestant in the 2025 season of reality series I'm a Celebrity...Get Me Out of Here!.

On 9 March 2026, it was announced that Thornton provided narration for the Sydney To Hobart documentary True South.

=== Stage highlights ===
Thornton's stage performances include a 2002/03 touring production of The Blue Room directed by Simon Phillips for the Melbourne Theatre Company opposite Marcus Graham. In 2009 she made her debut with Opera Australia in its production at Melbourne's Arts Centre as Desiree Armfeldt in Sondheim and Wheeler's A Little Night Music, directed by Stuart Maunder.

In 2014, she won critical acclaim for her portrayal of Blanche DuBois in Tennessee Williams' play A Streetcar Named Desire for the Black Swan State Theatre Company in Perth.

In 2015, she appeared in the premiere of Stephen Beckett's play Diary of a Nobody, inspired by the 1892 novel The Diary of a Nobody, at the Princess Theatre, Launceston, Tasmania. The same year, Thornton played the part of Golde in Fiddler on the Roof at the Princess Theatre, Melbourne.

As of September 2022 Sigrid made her stage debut for the Sydney Theatre Company in the premiere stage play The Lifespan of a Fact to rave reviews and in 2023 she returned to the stage for Anton Chekhov's The Seagull for the STC.

On 11 September 2024, Thornton was named for the 2025 season for the MTC play Mother Play. On 19 May 2026, Thornton was named for the QPAC production of Fiddler on the Roof.

=== Other ===
Thornton has served on several industry boards including the Australian Academy of Cinema and Television Arts, Film Victoria and the National Institute of Dramatic Art (NIDA). She has been MC for Australian appearances by Nelson Mandela and the Dalai Lama and for the Centenary of Federation joint sittings of the Australian Parliament.

== The "Sigrid Factor" ==
In his book The Big Shift, about changing Australian demographics and culture, Bernard Salt coined the term the "Sigrid factor" pointing out that Australian towns in which movies had been made featuring Thornton had prospered since that time. More broadly he referred to changing Australian cultural values which were well reflected in the types of places in which Sigrid Thornton had acted: the Riverland during the 1980s All the Rivers Run and the coast in the 2000s SeaChange.

== Personal life and advocacy ==
Thornton is married to actor and director Tom Burstall, having first met when she was just 18. Together they have two children.

She is known for her work with World Vision, the Royal Children's Hospital, Vision Australia, Reach Foundation and other charitable causes. She has lobbied successive governments to keep libraries open and to resource the Australian film and television industry. She has been appointed to several federal and state film bodies, including Film Victoria and is involved in helping to sustain and develop the industry.

In 2023 Thornton received a star on the Randwick Walk of Fame.

On Anh’s Brush With Fame, Thornton recounted how her father Neil Thornton enlisted in the army, and was sent to Japan in 1945 as part of a clean-up force following the atomic bomb being dropped in Hiroshima. His exposure to radiation led to him being diagnosed with Neurasthenia, which saw him suffer from chronic pain in the last ten years of his life.

In August 2024, Thornton's mother Merle Thornton died aged 93. Merle was a well known activist whom Sigrid looked up to. Sigrid said of her mother's passing that she was proud of her mother and everything she achieved.

In 2025, while appearing on I'm a Celebrity...Get Me Out of Here!, Thornton revealed that she had been diagnosed with ADHD, saying that the diagnosis had provided clarity. On 11 February 2025, Thornton was eliminated from the jungle alongside Tina Provis. Thornton held the record of 33 minutes in the Viper Room surrounded by 170 snakes.

On 4 May 2026, Thornton was awarded an honorary fellowship from the National Institute of Dramatic Art (NIDA) for her work within the industry.

== Filmography ==
=== Film ===
Year	Title	Role	Type
1977	The F.J. Holden	Wendy	Feature film
1977	The Getting of Wisdom	Maria	Feature film
1978	The King of the Two Day Wonder (aka The Wargame)	Christy	Feature film
1979	Snapshot (aka The Day After Halloween)	Angela	Feature film
1982	Duet for Four	Caroline Martin	Feature film
1982	The Man From Snowy River	Jessica Harrison	Feature film
1984	Street Hero	Gloria	Feature film
1985	Niel Lynne (aka Best Enemies)	Fennimore	Feature film
1987	Slate, Wyn & Me	Blanche McBride	Feature film
1987	The Lighthorsemen	Anne	Feature film
1988	The Man from Snowy River II	Jessica	Feature film
1992	Over the Hill	Elizabeth	Feature film
1997	Love In Ambush	Shelley Kincaird	Feature film
2000	Arctic Adventure	Lucy (voice)	Film animated short
2002	Living with Happiness	Mother (voice)	Film animated short
2002	The Pact	Susan Tuttle	Feature film
2003	Inspector Gadget 2	Mayor Wilson	Feature film
2003	Mittens	Mother	Film short
2008	Not Quite Hollywood: The Wild, Untold Story of Ozploitation!	Herself	Feature film documentary
2011	The Telegram Man	Barbara Lewis	Film short
2011	Face to Face	Claire Baldoni	Feature film
2014	BFFs	Jacqueline	Feature film
2016	Scare Campaign	Vicki	Feature film
2023	Slant	Vivianne Verity	Feature film

=== Television ===
Year	Title	Role	Type	Ref
1973	Homicide	Erica Johnston	1 episode	
1973	Certain Women		TV series	
1975	Division 4	Wendy Sherlock	1 episode	
1975; 1976	Matlock Police	Cathy Simpson / Simone Foley	2 episodes	
1976	Bluey	Helen Laughton	1 episode	
1976	Bobby Dazzler	Anastasia	1 episode	
1977	The Sullivans	Buffy Turnbull	24 episodes	
1977	Young Ramsay	Annette Murray	1 episode	
1977	Father, Dear Father In Australia	Sue Glover	14 episodes	
1978	Glenview High	Georgiana	1 episode	
1978	Case for the Defence	Mandy Lattimer	1 episode	
1978	Chopper Squad	Mandy Paramor	1 episode	
1978	The Truckies		1 episode	
1978–1980	Cop Shop	Tracy McBean / Karen / Helen Davis	3 episodes	
1979–1980	Prisoner	Roslyn Coulson	30 episodes	
1980	Skyways	Olivia Baker	1 episode	
1980	The Last Outlaw	Kate Kelly	Miniseries, 4 episodes	
1980	Lawson's Mates	Hannah	1 episode	
1980	Players in the Gallery		Film series, 1 episode	
1981	I Can Jump Puddles	Mabel	Miniseries, 2 episodes	
1981	Bellamy	Fiona	1 episode	
1981	Outbreak of Love	Anthea Langton	Miniseries	
1982	1915	Frances	Miniseries, 7 episodes	
1983	All The Rivers Run	Philadelphia Gordon	Miniseries, 8 episodes	
1983	The Boy in the Bush	Monica Ellis	Miniseries, 4 episodes	
1987	Great Expectations: The Untold Story	Bridget Tankerton	TV movie	
1987	The Far Country	Jennifer Morton	Miniseries, 2 episodes	
1988	Reading Australian Film	Presenter	Video	
1988–1991	Paradise	Amelia Lawson	56 episodes	
1993	The Feds	Christine McQuillan	TV movie pilot	
1993	Children at the Edge	Presenter	Documentary	
1994	G.P.	Renee Jackson	1 episode	
1994	Trapped In Space (aka Breaking Strain)	Issacs	TV movie	
1994	Wildscreen – Sperm Wars	Narrator	Documentary	
1994	One Family	Narrator	Documentary	
1994	Australian Fashion Awards	Host	TV special	
1996	Whipping Boy	Cass Meridith	TV movie	
1998	World Vision: A Friend In Need	Presenter	Documentary ~	
1998	Australian Story	Subject	1 episode	
1998–2000	SeaChange	Laura Gibson	47 episodes	
2000	The New Adventures of Ocean Girl	Narrator	10 episodes	
2002	Island Life	Narrator	6 episodes	
2003	ABC Australian Movie Screenings	Host	4 episodes	
2003	Welcher & Welcher	Satirised version of herself	1 episode	
2005	MDA	Dr. Robyn Masterton	4 episodes	
2005	Little Oberon	Lola Green	TV movie	
2006	Nightmares & Dreamscapes: From the Stories of Stephen King	Mrs. Anges Sternwood	Miniseries, episode 1	
2006	Ingenious Africa	Host	13 episodes	
2007	What's Good For You	Host	TV series	
2008	Dream Life	Mrs Buchanan	TV movie	
2010	Underbelly: The Golden Mile	Gerry Lloyd	7 episodes	
2012	Who Do You Think You Are?	Subject	1 episode	
2013	#7 Days Later	Molly	1 episode	
2014	The Code	Lara Dixon	6 episodes	
2015	Peter Allen: The Boy Next Door	Judy Garland	Miniseries, 2 episodes	
2016–2018	Wentworth	Sonia Stevens	26 episodes	
2018	Orange Is the New Brown	Dr. Vulva / Nigella Lawson	2 episodes	
2018	Anh's Brush with Fame	Subject	1 episode	
2019	Lambs of God	Rose Stanford	Miniseries, 2 episodes	
2019	SeaChange	Laura Gibson	13 episodes	
2020	Brazen Hussies	Narrator	TV film documentary	
2021	Amazing Grace	Diane Cresswell	8 episodes	
2025	I'm a Celebrity...Get Me Out of Here!	Contestant	TV series	
2025	Darby and Joan	Miranda McNeil	6 episodes	
2026	True South	Narrator	TV film documentary	

== Theatre ==
Year	Title	Role	Type
1983	Sydney Film Festival Opening Night 1983	Special guest	State Theatre, Sydney for Sydney Film Festival
2001	Betrayal	Emma	Fairfax Studio, Melbourne with MTC
2003–2004	The Blue Room	Various roles	Playhouse, Melbourne, His Majesty's Theatre, Perth, Theatre Royal, Sydney, Lyric Theatre, Brisbane with MTC
2004	Australia's Leading Ladies	Compere	Concert Hall, Brisbane with Queensland Symphony Orchestra
2007	Talking Heads	Lesley	His Majesty's Theatre, Perth, Gold Coast Arts Centre, Comedy Theatre, Melbourne, Theatre Royal, Hobart, Princess Theatre, Launceston, Canberra Theatre, Playhouse QPAC Brisbane, Theatre Royal, Sydney, Her Majesty's Theatre, Adelaide, Newcastle Civic Theatre
2009–2010	A Little Night Music	Desiree Armfeldt	Arts Centre, Sydney Opera House with Opera Australia
2014	A Streetcar Named Desire	Blanche DuBois	Black Swan State Theatre Company
2014	The Effect	Dr Lorna James	Southbank Theatre, Melbourne with MTC
2015	Diary of a Nobody	Lead	Princess Theatre, Launceston
2015–2016	Fiddler on the Roof	Golde	Capitol Theatre, Sydney with TML Enterprises
2022	The Lifespan of a Fact	Emily Penrose	Roslyn Packer Theatre, Sydney with STC
2023	The Seagull	Irina	Roslyn Packer Theatre, Sydney with STC
2025	Mother Play	Phyliss	MTC
2026	Fiddler on the Roof	Yente	Australian Tour
2027	A Delicate Balance	Anges	MTC
	Love Letters	Melissa Gardner	Ballarat Regent Theatre

== Accolades ==
Thornton has received numerous awards and honours through her career, including a Centenary Medal in 2002 and a Top 100 Australian Entertainers of the Century accolade from the Variety Club. In 2018, she was honoured with the Screen Legend Award by CinefestOZ film festival and in 2019 she received the Chauvel Award at the Gold Coast Film Festival. Thornton was also appointed an Officer of the Order of Australia (AO) in 2019.

=== Awards and nominations ===
Year	Association	Category	Work	Result
1975	Sammy Awards	Best Television Juvenile Performance	Homicide	Won
1979	Australian Film Institute Awards	Australian Film Institute Award	Snapshot	Nominated
1979	Logie Awards	Silver Logie for Best Actress in a Miniseries/Telemovie	1915	Nominated
1984	Logie Awards	Silver Logie for Best Actress in a Miniseries/Telemovie	All the Rivers Run	Won
1990	Viewers for Quality Television	Best Supporting Actress in a Quality Drama Series	Paradise	Nominated
1999	Australian Caption Centre	Personality of the Year		Nominated
1999	Logie Awards	Silver Logie for Most Outstanding Actress	SeaChange	Nominated
2000	Logie Awards	Silver Logie for Most Outstanding Actress	SeaChange	Won
2000	Logie Awards	Silver Logie for Most Outstanding Actress	SeaChange	Nominated
2000	Logie Awards	Gold Logie Award for Most Popular Personality on Australian Television	SeaChange	Nominated
2001	Logie Awards	Gold Logie Award for Most Popular Personality on Australian Television	SeaChange	Nominated
2001	Logie Awards	Silver Logie for Most Popular Actress	SeaChange	Nominated
2001	Logie Awards	Silver Logie for Most Popular Actress	SeaChange	Nominated
2002	Centenary Medal	Acting and Service to the Media		Honoured
2003	Mo Awards	Best Female Actor in a Play	The Blue Room	Won
2003	Helpmann Awards	Best Female Actor in a Play	The Blue Room	Nominated
2005	AACTA Awards	Best Lead Actress in a Television Drama	Little Oberon	Nominated
2015	AACTA Awards	Best Guest or Supporting Actress in a Television Drama	Peter Allen: Not the Boy Next Door	Won
2018	CinefestOZ	Screen Legend Award		Won
2019	Variety Club	Top 100 Australian Entertainers of the Century		Honoured
2019	Gold Coast Film Festival	Chauvel Award	Significant contribution to the Australian screen industry	Won
2019	Officer of the Order of Australia (AO)		Distinguished service to the performing arts as a film, television and stage actor, and to professional arts organisations	Honoured
2023	Randwick Walk of Fame	Star		Honoured
