= Friday Download: The Movie =

- Theatrical release poster
- Directed by: John Henderson
- Written by: Toby Davies
- Based on: Friday Download
- Produced by: Jeremy Salsby; Jules Elvins; Dan Shepherd
- Starring: Dionne Bromfield; Shannon Flynn; Bobby Lockwood; George Sear; Richard Wisker; Ethan Lawrence; Louisa Connolly-Burnham; Tyger Drew-Honey
- Cinematography: John Ignatius
- Edited by: Steve Tempia
- Music by: Jamie Salisbury; Banks & Wag
- Production companies: Saltbeef TV; Pilot Media; Heron Television; Paddock Productions
- Distributed by: Great Point Media; Spirit Entertainment Limited
- Release date: 22 May 2015 (UK)
- Running time: 93 minutes
- Country: United Kingdom
- Language: English

Friday Download: The Movie (released theatrically as Up All Night) is a 2015 British comedy film directed by John Henderson and is based on Friday Download, a children's entertainment programme airing on CBBC. The film was announced in 2014 and released on 22 May 2015. It stars Dionne Bromfield, Shannon Flynn, Bobby Lockwood, George Sear, Richard Wisker, Ethan Lawrence, Louisa Connolly-Burnham and Tyger Drew-Honey. The film was distributed by Great Point Media and produced by Jeremy Salsby, Jules Elvins and Dan Shepherd, with Toby Davies writing the screenplay.

== Cast ==
- Dionne Bromfield as Dionne
- Shannon Flynn as Shannon
- Bobby Lockwood as Bobby
- George Sear as George
- Richard Wisker as Richard
- Ethan Lawrence as Fraser
- Louisa Connolly-Burnham as Clara
- Tyger Drew-Honey as Caleb
- Luke Langsdale as Uncle Pete
- Angus Barnett as Gene Peck
- David Mitchell as Policeman
- The Vamps as themselves
- Bars and Melody as themselves
- Greg Davies as himself (cameo)

== Production ==
The film was shot over four weeks in and around Swansea. Filming commenced on 6 September 2014 in Margam Country Park, Wales. The film was fully financed by Great Point Media and is produced by Jeremy Salsby of Saltbeef TV and Jules Elvins of Pilot Media.

== Release ==
Friday Download: The Movie was released in the UK and Ireland on 22 May 2015, exclusively in Vue cinemas. The film was released under the title Up All Night. International sales were handled by Genesis Media Sales.

== Home media ==
Friday Download: The Movie was released on DVD and on demand by Spirit Entertainment Limited on 19 October 2015.
