= House of Anubis =

Nickelodeon television series

- Genre: Mystery
- Based on: Het Huis Anubis by: Hans Bourlon; Gert Verhulst
- Written by: Diane Whitley; Bede Blake; Neil Jones; Nathan Cockerill; James Whitehouse; Hannah George; Paul Gerstenberger; Alison Greenaway; Jodi Reynolds; Davey Moore; Tim Compton
- Directed by: Angelo Abela; Peter Fearon; Graeme Harper; Tessa Hoffe; Tim Hopewell; Tom Poole; Tracey Rooney; Gill Wilkinson
- Starring: Nathalia Ramos; Brad Kavanagh; Jade Ramsey; Ana Mulvoy-Ten; Bobby Lockwood; Tasie Lawrence; Eugene Simon; Alex Sawyer; Klariza Clayton; Burkely Duffield; Louisa Connolly-Burnham; Alexandra Shipp
- Theme music composer: Rob Cairnes; Tony Morales
- Countries of origin: Belgium; United Kingdom; United States
- Original language: English
- No. of seasons: 3
- No. of episodes: 190 (+ 90-minute TV special) (list of episodes)

Production
- Executive producers: Anja Van Mensel; Tony Wood
- Producers: Susie Liggat; Edward Pugh; Lucy Martin; Angelo Abela
- Production location: Liverpool
- Editors: David Mercer; David Long; Les Healey; Pauline Cain; Mark Doran
- Camera setup: Videotape; Single-camera
- Running time: 23 minutes
- Production companies: Studio 100; Lime Pictures; Nickelodeon Productions

Original release
- Network: Nickelodeon (2011–2013); TeenNick (2013)
- Release: 1 January 2011 – 17 June 2013

Related
- Anubis Unlocked; Het Huis Anubis; Het Huis Anubis en de Vijf van het Magische Zwaard; Das Haus Anubis

House of Anubis is a mystery television series developed for Nickelodeon based on the Dutch–Belgian television series Het Huis Anubis. The series was created by Hans Bourlon and Gert Verhulst and premiered on Nickelodeon on 1 January 2011 in the United States and on 25 February 2011 in the United Kingdom. The series is the first series from the network to be filmed outside the United States and the first telenovela-format series for the network. The show aired from 1 January 2011 to 17 June 2013.

== Plot ==
=== Season 1 ===
Anubis House is a residence at an English boarding school, built in the 1890s as part of an estate by Egyptologist Robert Frobisher-Smythe. The house is now the boarding house for nine secondary school students under the watch of the boarding school's strict caretaker, Victor Rodenmaar Jr and house-mother Trudy. A popular girl called Joy Mercer is withdrawn from the school without warning, along with all evidence of her existence. Joy's best friend, Patricia Williamson is saddened by Joy's disappearance. On the same day, a new girl from America named Nina Martin joins the school under a scholarship and replaces Joy as Patricia's new roommate. Patricia is sure it is no coincidence and accuses Nina of being part of Joy's disappearance.

Nina meets an elderly woman after moving in who gives her a locket shaped like the Eye of Horus. The woman identifies herself as Sarah Frobisher-Smythe, the daughter of Robert. However, when Nina walks Sarah back to her retirement home the Head Carer calls her Emily. Afterwards, Nina's locket proves to function as a key to open a secret panel in the attic, in which she finds a collection of antique phonograph cylinders and a portrait of Sarah as a girl matching a portrait in the locket. The cylinders are diary recordings made by Sarah during and after her parents' trip to Egypt to uncover Tutankhamun's tomb in 1922. Alongside Egyptian hieroglyphs on the back of the portrait, the recordings offer clues to the location of a number of Egyptian relics. Nina befriends a fellow boarder, Fabian Rutter, and they find several relics. After popular Amber Millington falls out with her friend Mara Jaffray over Amber's boyfriend Mick Campbell, Amber swaps dorms with Patricia so Amber can be roommates with Nina. Nina, Fabian and Amber form a secret group, 'Sibuna' (Anubis backwards), and later initiate prankster Alfie Lewis and Patricia, who is eager to learn how the relics are connected to Joy's disappearance. Patricia continues her effort to explain Joy's disappearance and enlists the help of Rufus Zeno, an enemy of Victor.

After finding seven relics, the Sibunas guess that they must be put together to make the Cup of Ankh, a mythic cup capable of producing an elixir of life. However, the cup can only be assembled by one born at seven o'clock on the seventh day of the seventh month. As Joy's birthday is the seventh of July, it is revealed that Victor and his secret society, consisting of staff from the school, a police officer, a nurse, and Joy's father, conspired to force Joy to assemble the Cup of Ankh. They removed Joy from school, and destroyed evidence of her existence, to protect her from Rufus, who is revealed to be a former member of the society who will stop at nothing in his quest for immortality. However, on the 'chosen hour' of the cup's assembly, Joy realises that, as she was born at seven PM, she is not able to assemble the cup; Nina, however, shares Joy's birthday and was born at seven o'clock in the morning. Nina assembles the cup and, with the rest of Sibuna, fool Rufus into believing himself immortal.

=== Season 2 ===
While hiding the Cup of Ankh, Nina unknowingly sets free an Egyptian spirit, Senkhara. Senkhara curses Nina with the Mark of Anubis, bending her to her will, and instructs her to find the Mask of Anubis, an artifact able to "weep tears of gold", an ingredient of the elixir of life. The Sibunas discover a chamber of tunnels underneath the house that contain a series of puzzles and tasks in order to progress, including swinging scythe-like pendulums over a chasm and a game of Senet using players as pieces. Senkhara is displeased with Nina's slow pace and gives the Mark of Anubis to the rest of Sibuna, and to Nina's grandmother, as a threat. Victor is also searching for the mask as he believes that it holds the missing ingredient for the elixir of life – tears of gold. Vera, Anubis House's new housemother, supports his quest, although she is a double agent working for Rufus, who faked his death after realising he was mortal. Sibuna and Victor try to outwit one another on the quest for the mask while Victor receives a grant for an Egyptian Exhibition in the school library, hoping that the recipe for the elixir will be written in one of the objects.

Meanwhile, Jerome locates his absent father in prison, who explains that his poor choices were caused by bad luck after losing the Frobisher Gem, a stone set into a trophy shield. Jerome teams up with Mara Jaffray, a bookish student, and successfully retrieves the gem by winning a table tennis tournament. Jerome and Mara's relationship develops romantically alongside new American pupil Eddie and Patricia.

Rufus seizes the mask from the final chamber, but discovers that it is a fake. The real mask was on display in the Egyptian Exhibition all along, and requires the Frobisher Gem to be activated. Senkhara briefly possesses Nina, intending to use her body to enter the Egyptian afterlife, prompting Eddie to realise his role as the 'Osirian', whose role is to protect the Chosen One. Senkhara, expelled from Nina's body, enters Rufus's and the two are imprisoned in the Underworld. Sibuna attend a school dance together while Victor discovers one of the tears of gold.

=== Season 3 ===
Nina has left to live with her grandmother. While a new teacher, Miss Denby, arrives at the school, new American student K.T. Rush also comes to the school. Eddie has a vision of K.T.'s dying grandfather giving her a key and telling her to go to Anubis House. Eddie and K.T. do some snooping around the house while Fabian tries to decipher a series of codes mistakenly given to Amber. Eddie and K.T. become new members of Sibuna. When Amber leaves for fashion school, Sibuna is revived with Eddie as a leader and Fabian, K.T., Patricia and Alfie as members. They find out that some individuals are trying to reawaken a sleeping Robert Frobisher-Smythe, with Denby being the "Keeper" (she keeps Frobisher in the tank room in the gatehouse, her home on the school property), Victor being the "Enabler" and Mr. Sweet being the "Seeker". The Sibunas discover that Miss Harriet Denby's name is actually Caroline. Her sister is actually Harriet – and the original Keeper. However, she is locked in a mental hospital because of her sister. It turns out that K.T. is the great-granddaughter of Frobisher and Jerome, Joy, Alfie and Patricia are the descendants of Frobisher's friends and are needed for the ceremony, but because of Caroline Denby lying about her identity, Frobisher is reawakened evil.

Everybody thinks that the ceremony didn't work out since Sibuna intervened just in time, but when Caroline goes to the gatehouse to pack her bags, she meets Frobisher, who is reawakened and evil. Caroline does not tell Sweet or Victor about this. Robert explains to Caroline that he needs to capture five sinning people for Ammut at midnight or noon, so that they could become evil. The sinners captured are Victor, Patricia, Mr. Sweet, Fabian and Alfie. Ammut rises, but needs more souls. She gives Frobisher a book that easily captures people's souls. A fake assembly is organized as an attempt to capture more souls. Willow (Louisa Connolly-Burnham) is the only person who didn't become a sinner and she, Eddie and K.T. are chased by Frobisher and the soul-less students but Harriet comes to the rescue with a stolen ambulance. She explains that Willow didn't become a sinner because she had K.T.'s moon key, and that Ammut can be sent back with it and Caroline's sun key. Willow becomes a sinner when she and K.T. try to steal the sun key because Harriet slipped the moon key into K.T.'s pocket. In the end, Ammut is sent back, devouring Caroline. Frobisher is not evil again and old. All the sinners are back to normal and don't remember what happened during the time they were sinners. Willow doesn't even remember the short time that she was good, so she forgot about the whole mystery. The Sibunas, of course, are told by Eddie and K.T. about what happened. Frobisher and Harriet set off for Egypt, and Jerome and Joy start a relationship. The group enjoys a fireworks display.

In the finale special Touchstone of Ra, the Anubis House residents are preparing for their graduation; however, their joyous celebration plans are cut short with the arrival of four [freshmen] fourth years who move in early – Cassie, Erin, Dexter and Sophia. Patricia instantly antagonizes Sophia because she spotted her flirting with Eddie. On their trip to an Egyptian museum, Eddie, Dexter and Sophia discover a special artifact known as the Touchstone of Ra. Back at the house, Victor announces that an artifact from the museum was stolen, and the Touchstone suddenly appears to be in Eddie's possession. Victor confiscates the Touchstone but has no intentions of returning it. Later, the Sibunas (along with Sophia and Mara) overhear Victor speaking to Mr. Sweet about what happens when the Pyramid of Ra is built. They plan to prevent him from building the Pyramid, retrieving the Touchstone for good measure. Eventually, Eddie discovers that Sophia has betrayed them when she plans to complete the Pyramid of Ra herself. At the graduation ceremony, Mara is manipulated by an unknown force when she wears the valedictorian medal (which is actually an artifact discovered by Alfie). At the house, the Sibunas team up with Victor to find the remaining pillars of the Pyramid to stop Sophia from accomplishing her goal. In the final showdown, the Pyramid is incomplete and the students are saved. Since Sophia failed, she is transformed into stone as a punishment from Ra. Eddie loses his Osirian powers in the process. Since Victor's "destiny" was to prevent the pyramid from ever being built, he decides to leave the house for good that evening as the students celebrate their graduation party.

== Cast and characters ==
House of Anubis season 2 cast (from L-R) Bobby Lockwood, Tasie Lawrence, Burkely Duffield, Jade Ramsey, Brad Kavanagh, Nathalia Ramos, Eugene Simon, Ana Mulvoy Ten, Alex Sawyer, and Klariza Clayton

=== Main cast ===
Name	Actor/Actress	Present in Episodes	Season
Nina Martin	Nathalia Ramos	1–150	1–2
Fabian Rutter	Brad Kavanagh	1–191	1–3, special
Patricia Williamson	Jade Ramsey	1–191	1–3, special
Amber Millington	Ana Mulvoy Ten	1–160	1–3
Mick Campbell	Bobby Lockwood	1–72, 141–150	1–2
Mara Jaffray	Tasie Lawrence	1–191	1–3, special
Jerome Clarke	Eugene Simon	1–191	1–3, special
Alfie Lewis	Alex Sawyer	1–191	1–3, special
Joy Mercer	Klariza Clayton	1, 29–32, 37, 47, 56–191	1–3, special
Eddie Miller	Burkely Duffield	75–191	2–3, special
KT Rush	Alexandra Shipp	151–191	3, special
Willow Jenks	Louisa Connolly-Burnham	151–191	3, special

=== Supporting cast ===
Name	Actor/Actress	Present in Episodes	Season
Victor Rodenmaar Jr.	Francis Magee	1–191	1–3, special
Trudy Rehman	Mina Anwar	1–191	1–3, special
Mrs. Daphne Andrews	Julia Deakin	1–108	1–2
Mr. Eric Sweet	Paul Antony-Barber	1–191	1–3, special
Rufus Zeno	Roger Barclay	12–60, 129–150	1–2
Sarah Frobisher-Smythe	Rita Davies	3–45, 60-61, 143	1-2
Jason Winkler	Jack Donnelly	5–60	1
Sergeant Roebuck	Nicholas Bailey	8–60	1
Ade Rutter	Simon Chandler	11–33	1
Esther Robinson	Catherine Bailey	15–60	1
Frederick Mercer	Michael Lumsden	18–60	1
Nurse Delia	Sheri-An Davis	18–60	1
Mr. Campbell	Stephen Beckett	23	1
Mr. Lewis	Cyril Nri	34–35	1
Mrs. Lewis	Sarah Wood	34–35	1
Robbie	James Gandhi	44–47	1
Victor Rodenmaar Sr.	Francis Magee	44-45, 140–145	1-2
Poppy Clarke	Frances Encell	61–150	2
Evelyn Meridian Martin	Gwyneth Powell	63–150	2
Senkhara	Sophiya Haque	63–150	2
Gustav Ziestack	Hugh Lee	63–150	2
Jasper Choudhary	Sartaj Garewal	67–150	2
Vera Devenish	Poppy Miller	73–149	2
Pete Roper, P.I.	Colin Mace	73–80	2
John Clarke	Philip Wright	25–150	2
Zoe Valentine	Sarah Paul	110–150	2
Piper Williamson	Nikita Ramsey	115–123, 186	2–3
Caroline Denby	Susy Kane	151–190	3
Harriet Denby	Bryony Afferson	162–190	3
Robert Frobisher-Smythe	John Sackville	171–190	3
Ben Reed	Freddie Boath	177–180	3
Ammut	Felicity Gilbert	189–190	3
Sophia Danae	Claudia Jessie	191	special
Dexter Lloyd	Jake Davis	191	special
Erin Blakewood	Kae Alexander	191	special
Cassie Tate	Roxy Fitzgerald	191	special

== Production and development ==
Production on the pilot episode began in August 2009, though with a different cast, under the title Anubis House, and initially for CBBC (BBC). In March 2010, Studio 100 announced that the series was sold to Nickelodeon in the United States, and Nickelodeon confirmed that House of Anubis was in development for a planned fall 2010 debut. The series was filmed in the summer of 2010 in Liverpool, and was first broadcast in the United States on 1 January 2011. Nickelodeon included House of Anubis in its 10 March 2011 press release for its annual Upfront presentation to advertisers and media.

The series is the first original series produced for the flagship U.S. Nickelodeon channel to be produced outside of North America. The series is structured in a different manner from other live-action television series in that each episode consists of two eleven-minute segments, a format commonly used in half-hour animated series (although the events of each subsequent segment pick up from the events of the previous segment); and the series' episodes are formatted to be broadcast in the five-day-a-week format that is typically common with soap operas or telenovelas.

On 29 June 2011, Entertainment Weekly confirmed that Nickelodeon had ordered a second season of House of Anubis and that production would begin on 21 July 2011 in Liverpool. A total of forty-five half-hour episodes (ninety 15-minute episodes) were aired, premiering on 9 January 2012.

On 16 April 2012, a third season was confirmed by Nickelodeon and Lime Pictures. Nathalia Ramos, who played lead character Nina Martin, did not return for the series' third season so that she could focus on finishing college. Eugene Simon confirmed that filming of the third season would begin in the summer of 2012. On 16 July 2012, Nickelodeon (UK & Ireland) announced on their Twitter page and the website's blog that filming of season 3 would begin that month. Bobby Lockwood announced on his Twitter page that he would not be returning for the series' third season, but instead that he had a new show called Wolfblood coming out on CBBC later in 2012. It was announced on the House of Anubis Facebook page that there would be new characters named KT Rush, played by Alexandra Shipp, and Willow, played by Louisa Connolly-Burnham.

The series was filmed in Liverpool with Ye Priory Court standing in for Anubis House, the gardens are filmed in Croxteth Park and Peckforton Castle Lodge, located in Chester, standing in for the gatehouse.

== Episodes ==
Season	Episodes		Originally released		
Season	Episodes		First released	Last released	Network
1	60		January 1, 2011	February 19, 2011	Nickelodeon
2	90		January 9, 2012	March 9, 2012	Nickelodeon
3	40	12	January 3, 2013	February 7, 2013	Nickelodeon
3	40	28	February 25, 2013	April 11, 2013	TeenNick
Special			June 14, 2013		TeenNick

== Anubis Unlocked ==
Anubis Unlocked is a behind the scenes show which aired in and produced by Nickelodeon UK. Ten episodes were commissioned for the first series of House of Anubis, which featured cast interviews, behind the scenes clips, tours of the set, and exclusive previews. These ten episodes were presented by Anna Williamson and Jamie Rickers.Anubis Unlocked was not commissioned for the second series of House of Anubis, though a short behind-the-scenes segment aired at the end of series two. Anubis Unlocked was re-commissioned for the third series of House of Anubis.

== Reception ==
=== Critical reception ===
Youth Television News praised the series, commending Nickelodeon's attempt at a drama series, saying "a good story always outdoes a repetitive sitcom."

=== Audience reception ===
The hour-long series premiere on 1 January 2011 was watched by an average of 2.9 million viewers for the first two episodes. The series scored a 4.0 share (846,000 viewers) among teens 11–17, a 4.4 share (952,000 viewers) among kids 11–15 and a 3.5 share (1.2 million) among kids 11–18, ranking #1 amongst all broadcast and basic cable programs in its timeslot in all pre-teen and teen demographics.

== Awards and nominations ==
Year	Award	Category	Recipient	Result	Ref.
2011	Nickelodeon UK Kids' Choice Awards	Nick UK's Favourite Show	House of Anubis	Won	
2011	Nickelodeon Kids' Choice Awards Argentina	Favorite International TV Show	House of Anubis	Nominated	
2011	British Academy Children's Awards	Drama	House of Anubis	Nominated	
2011	British Academy Children's Awards	Best Independent Production Company	Lime Pictures	Nominated	
2012	Nickelodeon UK Kids' Choice Awards	Favorite UK TV Show	House of Anubis	Nominated	
2012	Nickelodeon UK Kids' Choice Awards	Favorite UK Actor	Brad Kavanagh	Nominated	
2012	Nickelodeon UK Kids' Choice Awards	Favorite UK Actress	Ana Mulvoy Ten	Nominated	
2012	Broadcast Awards 2012	Best Children's Programme	House of Anubis	Nominated	
2012	British Academy Children's Awards	BAFTA Kid's Vote: Television	House of Anubis	Nominated	
2013	Nickelodeon UK Kids' Choice Awards	Favorite UK TV Show	House of Anubis	Won	
