= The Reef: Stalked =

2022 Australian horror film

- Official theatrical poster
- Directed by: Andrew Traucki
- Written by: Andrew Traucki
- Produced by: Andrew Traucki; Jack Christian; Michael Robertson; Neal Kingston
- Starring: Teressa Liane; Ann Truong; Saskia Archer; Kate Lister; Tim Ross
- Cinematography: Justin Brickle
- Edited by: Scott Walmsley
- Music by: Mark Smythe
- Production companies: Filmology Finance; Screen Queensland; Alliance Media Partners; Thrills & Spills Productions; Mysterious Light Productions
- Distributed by: RLJE Films; Shudder
- Release date: 29 July 2022
- Country: Australia
- Language: English
- Box office: $1,406,501

The Reef: Stalked is a 2022 Australian horror film written and directed by Andrew Traucki and produced by Jack Christian, Neal Kingston and Michael Robertson. A spiritual sequel to Traucki's 2010 film The Reef, the film stars Teressa Liane, Ann Truong, Saskia Archer, Kate Lister, and Tim Ross and follows a group of friends kayaking in tropical waters who soon find themselves fighting for their lives against a great white shark.

== Plot ==
The film opens with sisters Cath and Nic with friends Jodie and Lisa diving and spearing fish. Walking back to the carpark, Cath's abusive husband Greg takes Cath home. That evening, Nic gets a desperate text from Cath and rushes over only to find Cath's body drowned in a bath and Greg claiming she made him do it.

Nine months later, Nic returns from India and reunites with Jodie, Lisa and Annie (Nic and Cath's younger sister) at a rented cabin to a nearby island. After catching up and celebrating their reunion, the group goes on a kayaking trip the next day. While doing some spear fishing, Annie feels something is wrong and briefly notices a shark's dorsal fin. The group decides to call it a day and paddles for the closest island, where they can see some children swimming close to the beach. The group spreads out, leaving Annie to fall behind, she is tipped over by a massive great white shark but manages to get back onto the kayak. Lisa turns around to help, but is also thrown from her kayak. Trying to reach Annie, Lisa is killed by the shark.

A young girl, Demi, playing with her friend Winston, is bitten by the shark but survives. The three women decide to head to the nearest island for medical help. The children's mothers wait on the island with their children while Nic, Jodie and Annie tie a kayak to either side of an old fishing motor boat to stabilize it and then set off. While venturing across to the next island, the boat is taking in water and then the motor packs up, despite it having enough fuel, all the while encountering the shark along the way.

After Nic and Annie get into an argument about Nic being gone, the shark returns and drags Annie into the water, only for Annie to survive. Nic apologizes for not having been there after Cath's death, admitting it was too much for her and she blamed herself for not doing something, even when she believed something was wrong between Cath and Greg. Annie forgives Nic. When the shark reappears, Nic points out that, for some reason, it will hunt them to no end and they need to kill it rather than try to out-paddle it. Using a fish Jodie caught earlier as bait, they attach it to the boat's little anchor, hoping the shark will become stuck on the anchor and drown.

It seems to work at first and the three women resume their journey. However, the shark frees itself and attacks them once more. The women then throw a fishing net over the shark, trapping it. When Annie gets tangled in the net with the shark, Nic jumps in and stabs the shark multiple times, killing it. The three women rejoice and continue onto the island for help.

Sometime later, Annie, Jodie and Nic walk along a beach to a small plaque on a rock commemorating Cath and Lisa, "dive sisters forever". After receiving a video call from a fully recovered Demi, they leave flowers, a shell necklace and the original selfie of the four from the start of the film.

== Cast ==
- Teressa Liane as Nic
- Ann Truong as Jodie
- Saskia Archer as Annie
- Kate Lister as Lisa
- Tim Ross as Greg

== Production ==
In November 2020, it was announced that a sequel to The Reef was in development, with Andrew Traucki as director and writer. By May 2022, Teressa Liane, Ann Truong, Saskia Archer, Kate Lister, and Tim Ross were cast.

Principal photography began on June 10, 2021 in Australia. It was filmed in Bowen and the Whitsundays in Queensland. Production was originally scheduled to commence in late-2020, for a release in the summer of 2021. The film was financed by Filmology Finance.

== Release ==
In the US, The Reef: Stalked was released simultaneously in theaters and VOD by RLJE Films and Shudder on July 29, 2022.

== Reception ==
On the review aggregator website Rotten Tomatoes, 71% of 21 critics' reviews are positive. Metacritic, which uses a weighted average, assigned the film a score of 41 out of 100, based on four critics, indicating "mixed or average" reviews.
