= Nickelodeon UK Kids' Choice Awards 2013 =

British entertainment awards ceremony

2013 UK Kids Choice Awards
- Date: 24 March 2013
- Hosted by: Josh Duhamel
- Website: http://kca.nick.co.uk

Television/radio coverage
- Network: Nickelodeon UK and Ireland
- Runtime: 2 hours (5:30–7:30 p.m)

The 2013 UK Kids' Choice Awards were held on 24 March 2013. The show followed a similar format as the one in the United States, with seven unique categories for the UK. Voting started on February 16, 2013. The awards show gained 281,000 views and the pre-show received 201,000 views. It was the #1 rated of all children’s channels in the UK and Ireland on Sunday, 24 March 2013.

== UK Categories ==
This year, the Nickelodeon UK Kids' Choice Awards had seven unique categories, six remain the same as the previous year but one category changed from Favourite UK Newcomer to Sports Star. Below is a list of UK categories and their nominees. Bold text represents the winner.

Favourite UK Band

- **One Direction**
- The Wanted
- Little Mix
- Lawson

Favourite UK Female Artist

- Jessie J
- **Adele**
- Rita Ora
- Cheryl Cole

Favourite UK Male Artist

- Conor Maynard
- Olly Murs
- **Ed Sheeran**
- Labrinth

Favourite UK TV Show

- **House of Anubis**
- Doctor Who
- The X Factor
- Wolfblood

Favourite UK Actor

- **Robert Pattinson**
- Andrew Garfield
- Daniel Craig
- Matt Smith

Favourite UK Actress

- **Emma Watson**
- Keira Knightley
- Helena Bonham Carter
- Jenna-Louise Coleman

Favourite UK Sports Star

- **Tom Daley**
- Jessica Ennis
- Mo Farah
- Bradley Wiggins
