= Teressa Liane =

Australian actress

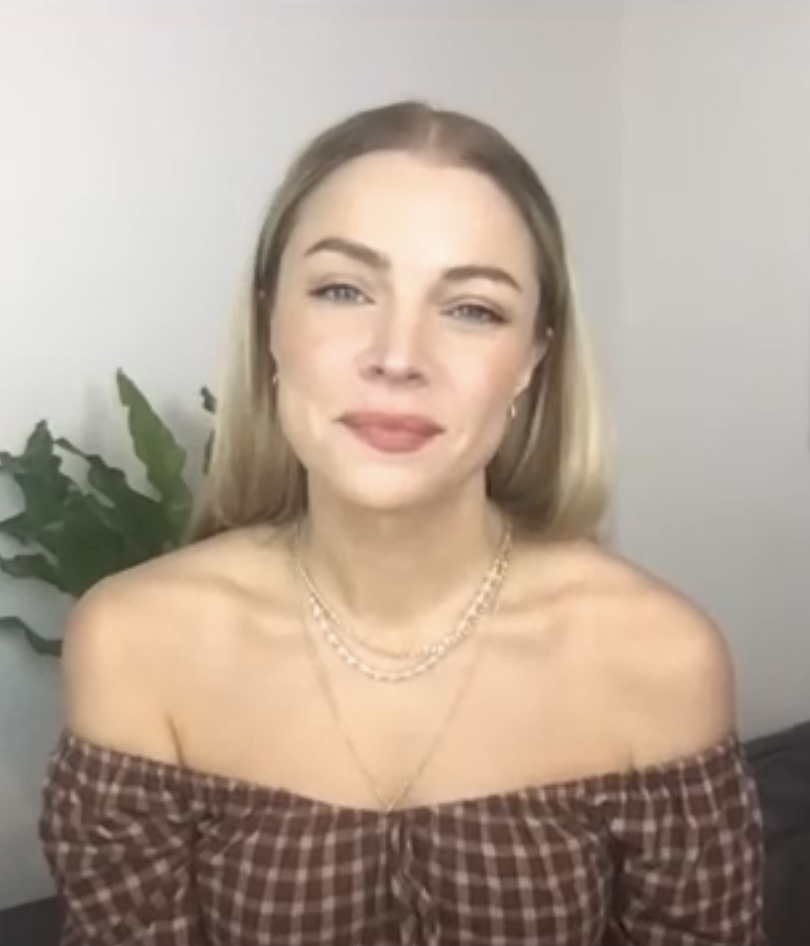
- Liane in 2022
- Born: Melbourne, Australia
- Education: La Trobe University
- Occupation: Actress
- Years active: 2011–present

Teressa Liane is an Australian actress. She is known for her roles as Rhiannon Bates in Neighbours, as Mary Louise on The Vampire Diaries, Angelica on Into the Badlands and as Agrippina in the Netflix documentary drama Roman Empire.

== Acting career ==
Teressa Liane debuted on television in 2011 as Tammy Frazer in Australian soap opera Neighbours. She returned to the serial in 2013 in the recurring role of Rhiannon Bates. She went on to star as siphoner and vampire hybrid Mary Louise in The Vampire Diaries on The CW; Angelica on Into the Badlands and Adrianne in the short film Rorrim. In 2019, Liane starred as Agrippina the Younger, Caligula's younger sister in series 3 "Caligula: The Mad Emperor" of the Netflix documentary drama Roman Empire.

== Filmography ==
Television and film roles
Year	Title	Role	Notes
2011	Neighbours	Tammy Frazer	Guest role
2011	The Cup	Nurse	Film
2012	Any Questions for Ben?	Bryony	Television film
2013	Neighbours	Rhiannon Bates	Recurring role
2015	Into the Badlands	Angelica	3 episodes (season 1)
2015–2016	The Vampire Diaries	Mary Louise	Recurring role (season 7), 11 episodes
2017	Stitchers	Chloe Marks	Episode: "Mind Palace"
2019	Roman Empire	Agrippina	Main role (season 3)
2019–2020	Last Blast Reunion	Mimi Lockhart	Web series spinoff from Days of Our Lives
2021	His Killer Fan	Kaylee Dawson	Television film (Lifetime)
2022	The Spy Who Never Dies	Trident	Film
2022	Magnum P.I.	Angie	Episode: "The Long Sleep"
2022	The Reef: Stalked	Nic	Film
2025	Zombie Plane		Film
