= Kate Lister =

Australian actress and producer

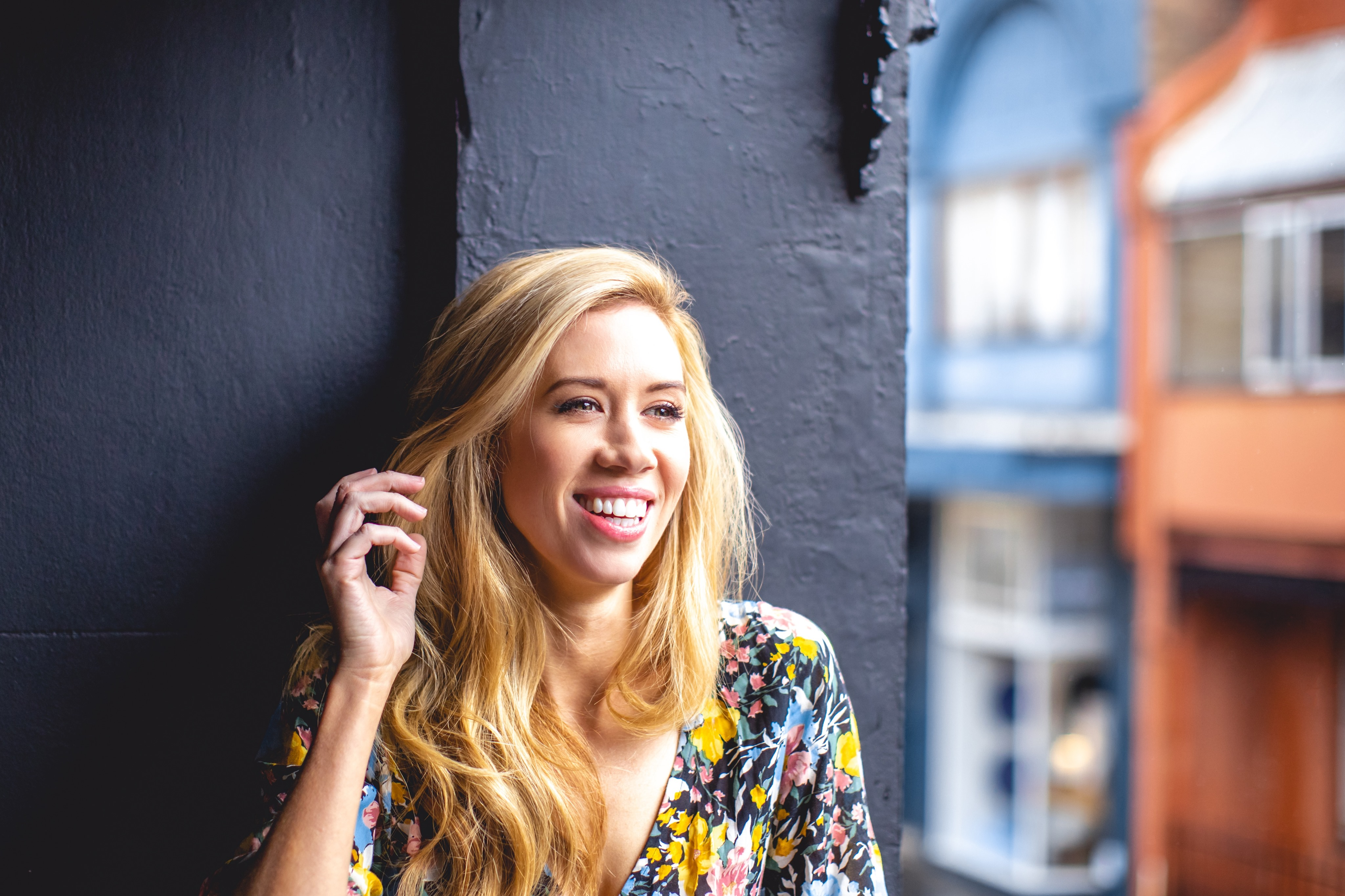
- Born: Melbourne, Victoria, Australia
- Occupations: Actress; film producer; film vocalist and DJ
- Years active: 2012–present
- Known for: Unhinged, Fox Trap, SeaChange
- Awards: Best Actress (Festigious Film Festival 2019)

Kate Lister is an Australian actress and producer, best known for her lead role in the horror movie Unhinged (2017). She also played series regular Lillian Liano, the quirky small-town cop, in television series SeaChange and Clickbait.

== Early life ==
Lister was born in Melbourne. After she finished high school, she studied at Melbourne performing arts school, Patrick School of the Arts (PSA). Lister also trained at The Actors Centre in London, Brave Studios in Melbourne, and the Atlantic Acting School in New York under the guidance of William H. Macy, Cynthia Silver, and David Mamet.

== Career ==
Lister began her career in the entertainment industry as a vocalist and DJ at the age of 24, before transitioning to acting in 2012 with the movie Just the Way It Is.

She has since worked on numerous feature films, TV movies and short films, including the British Sony Pictures' horror film Fox Trap (2016), Australian Universal Studios horror film The Reef: Stalked (2022) and dark comedy thriller Slant – Monster Festival's Best Film for 2022. Lister's portrayal of the lead character Rachel in the horror film Unhinged (2017) earned her critical acclaim and established her acting career.

Lister has also starred in several TV series. She played series regular Lillian Liano, the quirky small-town cop, in Nine’s SeaChange and Jeannine Murphy, the cutthroat journalist, in Netflix's miniseries Clickbait. She has also appeared in Neighbours and Bad Mothers.

In addition to her acting career, Lister continues to pursue her passion for music, performing as a DJ and vocalist. She is also a producer and co-owner of production company Little Fish Films.

== Filmography ==
=== Television ===
Key
†	Denotes films that have not yet been released

Year	Title	Role	Notes/Ref
2005	Last Man Standing	Female Shopper	Episode 20
2015	Neighbours	Hannah Dunham	1 episode
2015	Improv Sessions	Hayley	Episode 79: "Outcast"
2016	Man	Woman	Miniseries, episode 4: "The Toilet Break"
2017	The Warriors	Jessica	Miniseries, episode 4: "Mind Over Matter"
2017	Method	Kelly	Pilot episode: "Hungry"
2017	Murder	Mia Hemingway	Miniseries, episode 1: "Hunt for a Hunch"
2019	Bad Mothers	Phoebe	Miniseries, 3 episodes
2019	Snapperz	Sophie	Episode 1: "Bradley Coopers Underpants"
2019	SeaChange	Lillian Liano	Season 4, 8 episodes
2020	The Heights	Karen Satya	Season 2, 7 episodes
2021	Clickbait	Jeannine Murphy	Miniseries, 5 episodes
2022	Bump	Skye	Season 3, 3 episodes
2025	Apple Cider Vinegar	Jordan	Miniseries, 2 episodes

=== Film ===
Year	Title	Role	Notes
2012	Just the Way It Is		
2012	A Flicker of My Mother	Doppelganger	Short film
2015	Break it Gently	Lisa	Short film
2016	Fred	Lisa	Short film
2016	Fox Trap	Connie	
2017	Intune	Lauren	Short film
2017	Unhinged	Melissa	
2017	Suicide Club	Valerie	
2017	7 Storeys Down	Charlie	Also producer
2017	Indie Film	Hannah	Also producer
2018	Curse of the Scarecrow	June Sommers	
2018	Mandy the Doll	Shelby	
2019	The Final Scream	Kia Anderson	
2020	Drive Me to the End	Sunny Raei	Also producer
2022	The Reef: Stalked	Lisa	
2023	Slant	Una Power	
2024	Ricky Stanicky	World River Exec #2	
TBA	Schnookums	Leyla	
TBA	Rotten	Emily	In post production
TBA	Dogged	Kelly Watson	In development
TBA	The Fortunate	Brooklyn	In development

=== As producer ===
Year	Title	Type	Notes
2017	7 Storeys Down	Film	
2017	Indie Film	Film	
2020	Drive Me to the End	Film	

== Awards and nominations ==
Year	Award	Category	Nominated work	Result	Ref(s)
2019	Festigious International Film Festival	Best Actress	7 Storeys Down	Won	
2019	Indie Film Chart	April Award	7 Storeys Down	Won	
2020	Queen Palm International Film Festival	Best Actress	Drive Me to the End	Won	
2020	Queen Palm International Film Festival	Best Feature	Drive Me to the End	Won	Shared with Richard Summers-Calvert
