= Stephen Harrod Buhner =

American herbalist and writer (1952–2022)

Stephen Harrod Buhner was an American herbalist and writer. Buhner was born July 15, 1952.

Buhner was first introduced to healers within his own family, including Leroy Burney, president of the Kentucky Medical Association and Surgeon General of the United States under Eisenhower and Kennedy. His most important influence was Elizabeth Lusterheide, a midwife and herbalist in southern Indiana in the early 1800s, and C.G. Harrod, his great-grandfather who began practicing medicine in 1911, and who inspired Buhner to become the kind of healer for which, according to Buhner, American medicine no longer has a place.

Buhner authored at least 23 books, scores of nonfiction articles, as well as fiction and poetry. His works focused on nature, sustainability, indigenous cultures, the environment, herbal medicine, Gaia hypothesis, and communication with nature. His book, The Lost Language of Plants, received a Nautilus award and a BBC Environmental Book of the Year Award. His book, Earth Grief: The Journey Into and Through Ecological Loss, also won a Nautilus award. In 2022, he received the first annual McKenna Academy Distinguished Natural Philosopher Award in recognition of his life's work.

For over thirty years, Buhner was the head researcher for the Foundation for Gaian Studies. He was also a Fellow of Schumacher College, United Kingdom. He taught throughout the United States and Canada, and the Western European Isles. He served as president of the Colorado Association for Healing Practitioners and as a lobbyist on herbal and holistic medicines and education in the Colorado legislature. His work was featured in popular media outlets, including Common Boundary, Apotheosis, Shaman's Drum, The New York Times, CNN, and Good Morning America.

Buhner considered himself a polymath, and his life experience attests to this summation. He underwent wilderness survival training in Colorado, from 1972 to 1975. Buhner was also a fine woodworker and builder of custom furniture and restored and remodeled artful solar homes, from 1975 until 1984. He was a workshop leader, lecturer, teacher, and psychotherapist in private practice, during 1981 to 1995. Buhner was a proprietor of rare book and manuscript business from 1985 to 1992, in addition to his most well-known work as an herbalist. He also served as the editor of the journal Healer's Review, from 1990 to 1995. Buhner was a spiritual contemplative, mostly of contemplative animism, and served as an Ordained practitioner of Church of Gaia in 1990.

Buhner focused deeply on breaking new ground in the understandings of the states of mind necessary for sustainable human habitation of Earth, Gaian dynamics, plant function in ecosystems, and sophistications of herbal medicines in treating emerging and chronic infections. Buhner is particularly well known for creating a protocol for Lyme disease and its coinfections. Buhner was also known amongst brewers, having authored the first comprehensive book ever written on the sacred aspects of indigenous, historical psychotropic and herbal healing beers of the world, Sacred and Herbal Healing Beers (1988). This work contributed to the gruit renaissance, particularly in France, and the emergence of unique historical ales and beers made by such companies as Dogfish Brewery. Buhner also brought the concept of direct (rather than indirect) androgenic plants (plants that contain testosterone and other androgens) to the field of American herbal medicine.

One of the main tenets of Buhner's work concerned communication with the natural world. Buhner provided historical and experiential evidence that holistic thinking is at the root of most major scientific discoveries. Buhner explained there is a common experience in those moments of discovery, a leap of understanding that emerges suddenly out of the depths of the self. It is intuitive and spontaneous, and derives not from disconnected objectivity but intimate communication and connection. Buhner argued that the most innovative scientists maintain a sense of aliveness of the phenomenon being studied, whether it be a mathematical phrase, a star, an ecological system, a bacterium, a molecule, or any other phenomenon. Buhner documented how such esteemed scientists, inventors, and philosophers such as George Washington Carver, Henry David Thoreau, Luther Burbank, Goethe, Albert Einstein, Barbara McClintock, James Lovelock, Masanobu Fukuoka, and others all attested to this open, curious, and intuitive approach as central to their process, and insisted knowledge and insights arose directly from intimate and nonlinear communication with what was studied.

In March 2020, some of Buhner's herbal protocols were marketed by alternative practitioners in Boise, Idaho, as a cure for COVID-19. One of these practitioners, using Buhner's name without Buhner's permission, received a written warning from the FDA in 2020, for making such unfounded claims. Buhner was not affiliated with this company, its practitioners, or any other company selling his herbs as a cure, and expressed concern that his name was associated and used without consent. In response, Buhner argued for the effectiveness of herbal medicines in some circumstances. Additionally, Buhner encouraged research and protocols for people to boost their immunity immediately, since the creation of vaccines for new viruses takes time.

In his later years, Buhner lived near Silver City, New Mexico. He spent his final days near Gila National Forest, adjacent to the Aldo Leopold Wilderness area, a poetically appropriate place, given Buhler's life's work. He died on December 8, 2022.

== Books ==
- Sacred Plant Medicine: Explorations in the Practice of Indigenous Herbalism. Roberts Rinehart. 1996. ISBN 978-1-57098-085-5.
- One Spirit, Many Peoples: A Manifesto for Earth Spirituality. Roberts Rinehart. 1997. ISBN 978-1-57098-120-3.
- Sacred and Herbal Healing Beers: The Secrets of Ancient Fermentation. Siris Books. 1998. ISBN 978-0-937381-66-3.
- Herbal Antibiotics: Natural Alternatives for Drug-Resistant Bacteria. Storey Publishing. 1999. ISBN 978-1-58017-148-9.
- Herbs for Hepatitis C and the Liver. Storey Publishing. 2000. ISBN 978-1-58017-255-4.
- The Lost Language of Plants: The Ecological Importance of Plant Medicines to Life on Earth. Chelsea Green. 2002. ISBN 978-1-890132-88-0.
- The Taste of Wild Water: Poems and Stories Found While Walking in Woods. Raven Press. 2002. ISBN 978-0-9708696-1-6.
- The Fasting Path: The Way to Spiritual, Physical, and Emotional Enlightenment. Avery. 2003. ISBN 978-1-58333-170-5.
- Vital Man: Natural Health Care for Men at Midlife. Avery. 2003. ISBN 978-1-58333-136-1.
- The Secret Teachings of Plants: The Intelligence of the Heart in the Direct Perception of Nature. Inner Traditions/Bear. 2004. ISBN 978-1-59143-035-3.
- Herbal Antivirals: Natural Remedies for Emerging & Resistant Viral Infections. Storey Publishing. 2013. ISBN 978-1-61212-160-4.
- Plant Intelligence and the Imaginal Realm: Beyond the Doors of Perception into the Dreaming of Earth. Bear & Company. 2014. ISBN 978-1-59143-135-0.
