= Pride and Prejudice (disambiguation) =

Pride and Prejudice is a novel by Jane Austen.

Pride and Prejudice may also refer to:

== Film ==
- Pride and Prejudice (1940 film)
- Pride & Prejudice (2005 film)
  - Pride & Prejudice (soundtrack)
- Pride & Prejudice: A Latter-Day Comedy, a 2003 film

== Television ==
- Pride and Prejudice (1958 TV series)
- Pride and Prejudice (1967 TV series)
- Pride and Prejudice (1980 TV series)
- Pride and Prejudice (1995 TV series), a BBC series starring Jennifer Ehle and Colin Firth
- Pride and Prejudice (2026 TV series), a Netflix series starring Emma Corrin and Jack Lowden

== Other uses ==
- "Pride & Prejudice", a 2017 episode of One Day at a Time
- Pride and Prejudice (musical), a 1993 musical
- Pride and Prejudice* (*sort of) a 2018 play

== See also ==
- Bride and Prejudice, a 2004 Bollywood-style film
- Bride & Prejudice (TV series), a 2017 Australian reality show
- Pride and Prejudice and Zombies, a 2009 parody novel by Seth Grahame-Smith
  - Pride and Prejudice and Zombies (film)
- The Pride and the Passion, a 1957 movie about the Peninsular War
