= Black Water (2007 film) =

- Theatrical release poster
- Directed by: David Nerlich; Andrew Traucki
- Written by: David Nerlich; Andrew Traucki
- Produced by: David Nerlich; Michael Robertson; Andrew
- Starring: Diana Glenn; Maeve Dermody; Andy Rodoreda
- Cinematography: John Biggins
- Edited by: Rodrigo Balart
- Music by: Rafael May
- Distributed by: AV Pictures (Australia); Universal Pictures (United Kingdom)
- Release dates: 3 August 2007 (Nuremberg Fantasy Filmfest); 22 February 2008 (United Kingdom); 2 July 2008 (Australia)
- Running time: 89 minutes
- Countries: Australia; United Kingdom
- Language: English
- Box office: $1.2 million

Black Water is a 2007 Australian-British horror film written and directed by Andrew Traucki and David Nerlich. The film, an international co-production of Australia and the United Kingdom, is set in the mangrove swamps of northern Australia, and stars Diana Glenn, Maeve Dermody and Andy Rodoreda. Inspired by the true story of a crocodile attack in Australia's Northern Territory in December 2003, a pregnant woman, along with her husband and her sister, takes a boat tour of a mangrove swamp, where they are terrorised by a ferocious saltwater crocodile.

== Plot ==
While on vacation, Grace, her husband Adam, and Grace's younger sister Lee decide to visit a crocodile show. The next day Grace takes a pregnancy test and it is positive, but does not tell Adam. They head to "Black Water Barry's" fishing tour on a whim to take a boat ride into the mangrove swamp to try some fishing.

Once they arrive at the docks, their tour guide Barry is not available, but Jim, another guide, offers to take them instead. Jim arms himself with a revolver and they set off. After failing to catch any fish on the usual route, Jim suggests going deeper into the swamps. While in a small clearing, Lee spots something through her camera and alerts Grace, but later finds nothing.

Suddenly, the boat capsizes, dumping the occupants into the water. Jim is killed underwater, and Adam realizes that a crocodile has attacked them. He helps Grace into a nearby tree and searches the water for Lee, who got tangled up in ropes underneath the boat. Grace sees the beast nearby and convinces Adam to come back. Lee frees herself, but the beast swims after her. She manages to climb atop the boat, but the beast thrashes the boat in an attempt to throw her off. Adam and Grace distract it and it swims away. Realizing they can use the boat's ropes to pull Lee to safety, they attempt to execute this plan, only for the boat to get stuck. A hesitant Lee is forced to swim across and makes it, despite panicking halfway across. The women suggest waiting for help, but Adam claims no one saw them leave, so Grace tries climbing the trees back to the mainland. However, she is forced to climb back after finding pieces of a corpse. An impatient Adam goes for the boat. He successfully overturns it, but the beast kills him. The women make numerous attempts to continue his plan, only to be thwarted at every turn, and eventually, the boat floats away out of safe reach. At night the beast starts eating Adam.

The next day, they decide to find the boat and the beast confronts them. The beast attacks them, forcing them back to their original tree, though Grace suffers a nasty bite to her thigh in the process. Because of heavy bleeding, her condition worsens over time. A boat comes past and they shout, but it cannot hear them due to its propeller. Lee tries once again to reach the boat and is successful, but the beast suddenly attacks, leaping into the boat. Lee floats unconscious to a very small island alongside Jim's body. She patches herself up and takes his revolver, but finds the gun jammed with mud, so she cleans and unjams it.

She tries to lure the beast in using Jim's detached arm as bait, holding the pistol ready to fire at it. It attacks but the gun jams again. She flees with the beast close behind. It launches a sneak attack when she stops, but Lee manages to get the gun working and kills it. The threat averted, she makes her way back to Grace, who has died from her injuries. Lee, devastated, mourns her sister as she places her on the boat and paddles out of the mangrove.

== Cast ==
- Maeve Dermody as Lee
- Diana Glenn as Grace
- Andy Rodoreda as Adam
- Ben Oxenbould as Jim
- Fiona Press as Pat

== Production ==
The location representing the vast mangroves system in northern Australia was actually in the directors' home town of Sydney, 25 minutes from the Central business district In a small suburb called Oatley. They also spent a week in Darwin shooting footage of real saltwater crocodiles that were transplanted into the location along with the actors, with the directing team doing their own CG special effects to achieve this.

== Release ==
- World Premiere – opening London FrightFest Film Festival, London, 23 August 2007.

Other festivals:

- Montreal World Film Festival
- Fantasy Filmfest, (Germany)
- Melbourne Underground Film Festival
- Commercial premiere 4 January in UK. Distributor: The Works UK
- North American distributor: Grindstone Entertainment Group

== Reception ==
Black Water received positive reviews from critics. On review aggregator website Rotten Tomatoes, the film received an approval rating of 80% based on 20 reviews, with an average rating of 5.93/10. Critics praised the lack of CGI commonly used in this type of film, as well as the tense plotting and suspense built from it. Neil Smith of Total Film Magazine also praised the ending stating it was "a conclusion that refreshingly refutes the genre rulebook."

=== Awards ===
Award	Category	Subject	Result
AACTA Awards (2008 AFI Awards)	Best Supporting Actress	Maeve Dermody	Nominated
AACTA Awards (2008 AFI Awards)	Best Editing	Rodrigo Balart	Nominated
Australian Guild of Screen Composers	Music Award for Best Soundtrack	Rafael May	Won
FCCA Awards	Best Supporting Actress	Maeve Dermody	Nominated
FCCA Awards	Best Editing	Rodrigo Balart	Nominated
Inside Film Awards	Best Director	David Nerlich	Nominated
Inside Film Awards	Best Director	Andrew Traucki	Nominated
Inside Film Awards	Best Actress	Maeve Dermody	Nominated
Inside Film Awards	Best Editing	Rodrigo Balart	Nominated
Melbourne Underground Film Festival	Best Director	David Nerlich	Won
Melbourne Underground Film Festival	Best Director	Andrew Traucki	Won
Melbourne Underground Film Festival	Best Cinematography	John Biggins	Won

== Box office ==
Black Water performed well financially and grossed $1,271,556 worldwide.

== Sequel ==
In February 2018, a sequel titled Black Water: Abyss was announced to be in development. Andrew Traucki was hired to serve as director and producer after serving as co-writer/co-director on the first installment. Described as a survival horror-thriller film, co-written by John Ridley and Sarah Smith, the plot was stated to revolve around a group of friends exploring a remote cave system only to be pursued and preyed upon by a killer crocodile. Produced by Michael Robertson, the studios stated that the movie would use practical effects and real animal footage.

Black Water: Abyss was released on 4 July 2020 in the UK and on 30 July 2020 in Australia.

== See also ==
- Cinema of Australia
- List of Australian films
- List of killer crocodile films
