= Nickelodeon UK Kids' Choice Awards 2011 =

British entertainment awards ceremony

2011 UK Kids Choice Awards
- Date: April 3, 2011
- Website: http://kca.nick.co.uk

Television/radio coverage
- Network: Nickelodeon UK

The 2011 UK Kids Choice Awards took place on 3 April 2011 at 4:30pm. This year it followed a similar format as the one in the United States. There were two Nick UK categories. Voting started on March 1, 2011.

The awards broadcast on Nick UK was the same programme as the original US broadcast, but with special inserts featuring Nick UK presenters announcing the winners of two UK-specific categories.

== Nickelodeon UK award categories ==
=== Nick UK's Favourite Show ===
- Big Time Rush
- Victorious
- iCarly
- House of Anubis (Winner)

=== Nick UK's Funniest Person ===
- Jerry Trainor as Spencer Shay (iCarly) (Winner)
- Matt Bennett as Robbie Shapiro (Victorious)
- Jamie Rickers (Nick UK)
- Matt Shively as Ryan Laserbeam (True Jackson)
