= Bobby Lockwood =

English actor (born 1993)

- Lockwood in 2026
- Born: 24 May 1993 (age 33); Basildon, Essex, England
- Occupation: Actor
- Years active: 2002–present
- Website: bobbylockwood.co.uk

Bobby Lockwood (born 24 May 1993) is an English actor. He is known for his roles as Mick Campbell in House of Anubis (2011–2012) and as Rhydian Morris in Wolfblood (2012–2014). In 2021, he appeared on the BBC medical drama series Casualty as Leon Cook.

== Career ==
In 2006, when he was 12, Lockwood appeared in the BBC school drama series Waterloo Road. In 2012, he was cast as Mick Campbell in Nickelodeon's House of Anubis. He later left the programme during the second series to star in the CBBC series Wolfblood; for which he won a British Academy Children's Award for Best Performer in 2013. That same year, Lockwood hosted the BAFTA Children's Awards Showcase with Shannon Flynn. In 2014, Lockwood won the BBC athletics series Tumble. In January 2021, Lockwood joined the cast of the BBC medical drama series Casualty as paramedic Leon Cook. He left the series in May of that year.

== Filmography ==
=== Film ===
Year	Title	Role	Notes	Ref.
2003	101 Dalmatians II: Patch's London Adventure	Patch	Voice	
2013	Ups & Downs	Harry	Short film	
2014	Relapse	Ben	Short film	
2015	Friday Download: The Movie	Bobby	Originally released as Up All Night	
2016	Honey 3: Dare to Dance	Laser		
2016	Acres and Acres	Matt	a.k.a. Mum's List	
2017	Access All Areas	Nathan		
2017	Dunkirk	Able Seaman		
2017	Vikes	Warren Turdslinger		
2020	The Outpost	PFC Kevin Thomson		
2020	Eurovision Song Contest: The Story of Fire Saga	Jeff		
2020	Wings	Robert	Short film	
2021	Outside the Wire	Reggie		
2021	Glia	Gunthur Essen		
TBA	The Entertainer †	TBA	Post-production	

=== Television ===
Year	Title	Role	Notes	Ref.
2006	The Bill	Taylor Little	3 episodes	
2006	Waterloo Road	Extra		
2011–2012	House of Anubis	Mick Campbell	Main role (seasons 1–2)	
2012–2014	Wolfblood	Rhydian Morris	Main role (seasons 1–3)	
2013	Touchstone of Ra	Mick Campbell	Cameo; TV special	
2013	Dani's Castle	Conal Connor	Episode: "Hey Mr. DJ"	
2014	Tumble	Himself	Winner	
2014	Hacker Time	Himself	Guest	
2015	Lewis	Sam Langton	2 episodes	
2017	Unforgotten	Nathan	Episode #2.1	
2017	Uncle	Josh	Episode: "Bringing Sexy Back"	
2018	Doctors	Paul Kirkwood	Episode: "In the Dark"	
2018	Ransom	Sean	Episode: "Radio Silence"	
2020	The Emily Atack Show	Marcus / Ollie / Max	2 episodes	
2021	Casualty	Leon Cook	Regular cast	
2021	Grantchester	Joe Davies	Episode #6.7	
2022	Tell Me Everything	Brett	3 episodes	
2023	The Diplomat	Eddie Hardgreaves	Episode #1.2	
2023	The Tower	DC Lee Coutts	Series 2 and 3	
2024	Here We Go	Carl	Episode #2.4	
2025	Grace		1 episode	
2026	Rivals	Dommie Carlisle	Series 2	

== Stage ==
Year	Title	Role	Notes
	Shuffle	Two	The Other Palace
	The Snowman	The Boy (Lead)	Peacock Theatre
2025	Emma	Elton	Rose Theatre, Kingston

== Awards and nominations ==
Year	Association	Category	Work	Result	Ref.
2013	British Academy Children's Awards	Best Performer	Wolfblood	Won	
