= List of Dani's Castle characters =

In the CBBC sitcom Dani's Castle, the title character (played by Dani Harmer) inherits Bogmoor Castle from her aunt. She soon finds out what hides in the castle, and meets a lot of new people, including resident ghosts who died over 250 years ago. The series features a cast of characters from relatives of Dani to guest visits by some of the regular characters from Dani's House. In Series 3, the show is informally known as Rich Jimmy & Kait's Castle due to Dani Harmer's exit from the show at the end of Series 2. Everyone who had not departed previously made their final appearances in "It's A Wonderful Afterlife" due to Series 3 being the final series.

== Main characters ==
=== Dani ===
Dani, played by (Dani Harmer) first appeared in "The Castle". She has moved from her old house and finds out that her Aunt that she never knew had left her with a castle. She has to live there by herself without her parents or her brother Max who is now a big rapper and is going on tour with their parents around the world.

Dani arrives at her castle and meets two resident of Bogmoor: Kaitlin (played by Shannon Flynn) and Leo (played by Lorenzo Rodriguez). They offered Dani the key to the castle. As soon as she arrives in Bogmoor, Dani and Kait became best friends. But that's not all. She also meets two old residents who are not only humans but also ghosts who died over 250 years ago. Dani falls in love with one of the ghosts Gabe (played by Niall Wright) and eventually they both love each other. While exploring the castle, she meets a cousin that she didn't know name Jimmy (played by Kieran Alleyne) who is accident-prone and who sometimes acts cool. Later in the year, she meets another cousin that she didn't know about name Rich (played by Richard Wisker) who is a businessman. Dani left the castle in at the end Series 1 to go to Hollywood and eventually she became a movie star. But she still needed to look after her home in Ireland. She does not appear in person in Series 2, but her friends kept in touch with her on Skype on Kait's tablet. In "Save Our Station", Dani revealed that she was never going to come home, she had decided to stay in Hollywood and therefore she gave her part of the castle to Kait. She did not appear in Series 3. Dani is the ex-girlfriend of Gabe and cousin of Jimmy, Rich and Dylan.

=== Jimmy ===
Jimmy, played by Kieran Alleyne, is one of Dani's cousins and a person that didn't know about the castle until he arrived. Jimmy is accident-prone and likes to dance. He can sometimes be lazy and a bit messy. He used to live in the city and has no idea how to live in the countryside. Jimmy and Leo sometimes work together to pull pranks and help out with anything and Jimmy helps Gabe with any problem he has with Dani. Jimmy and Kaitlyn often argue a lot and sometimes put each other at war when they both don't listen to each other. Jimmy also argues and fights with Dani when they don't agree on both of the things like if Jimmy wants a paintball arena, Dani won't let him. Jimmy sometimes treats Esme like a slave for example his fake birthday. Later in the series, Rich comes over to the castle and soon Jimmy helps out since they both have the same idea. In "Girl Trouble", he mistakenly thought Kait has a crush on him and tries to impress her, by watching a romantic movie with her. He then argues with Gabe, who also mistakenly thought Kait has a crush on him. Kait said she doesn't like any one of them and leaves. In "Stupid Cupid", Jimmy and Clare had a date and got together. Jimmy is best friends with Kait, Gabe and Esme, the cousin of Dani, Dylan and Rich, and boyfriend of Clare. He also helps Dani get through the hard times.

=== Gabe ===
Gabe, played by Niall Wright is one of the ghosts of the castle who died 250 years ago. He doesn't know much about the 21st Century and knows much about the 18th Century. He falls in love with Dani and wrote many love poems about her. He also wrote many love songs about Dani and he dislikes scaring humans. While his younger sister, Esme loves scaring humans. He's often shy, afraid to ask Dani out. In "21st Century Boy", Dani asked Gabe out, which Gabe finds it funny for a girl to ask a boy out, which upsets Dani. Jimmy helps him to become a 21st Century boy, but fails when Dani's friend Ben came to Bogmoor. He mistakes that Ben is Dani's boyfriend and declares war to win Dani's heart. In "Rich", Gabe was devastated that Dani is going to Hollywood for her acting career and refuses to let her go. Gabe used "the gift" for Dani, allowing him to touch and feel Dani. The two kiss before her departure. In series 2, Gabe struggles without Dani and wrote songs about her to get over Dani. In "Girl Trouble", Gabe thinks Kait has fallen in love with him and became jealous when Jimmy tries to steal her. The two fight, saying that Kait it theirs. But Kait said she doesn't like any of them. In "Save Our Station", Gabe finds out that Dani is never coming back to Bogmoor as she has decided to stay in Hollywood, because of this he crosses over to the Other Side. In "Back to Bogmoor", Gabe and Esme return from the other side. In "The Ghostel", Gabe decided to set up the first-ever ghostel, and later was distraught after Esme revealed that she only returned to say goodbye as she had decided that she belonged on the other side. In the Christmas Special, Gabe had mistakes during Christmas Eve, making everyone upset. He made egg tarts and lemonade for his friends and accidentally split them on the Bogmoor FM radio set where Jimmy and Rich work. He shrunk Dylan and Leonie's Christmas stockings and accidentally knocked over the Christmas tree while trying to put up the Christmas star tree topper for Kait and Claire. That night, he attempts to leave the castle to join Esme on the other side. But Esme returned to the castle to celebrate Christmas with him and he told her the stories of his mistakes. Esme showed him the past of the memories his did for his friends, like telling Jimmy and Rich to carry on the Bogmoor FM, mending Kait and Claire's friendship and saving Leonie from an energy force on Dylan's new machine. Esme then showed the future that might happen if he's not around, like Rich and Jimmy become weather navigators, Claire and Kait are enemies and Leonie being trapped inside a mirror after testing out Dylan's machine. Gabe decided to stay and he and Esme fixed everything up until Christmas Day. He's the older brother of Esme and ex-boyfriend of Dani.

=== Kait ===
Kait, played by Shannon Flynn, is one of the residents of Bogmoor and best friends with Dani. Kait and her brother Leo have been in Bogmoor for years now when they moved from Manchester. Kaitlin finds her younger brother Leo very annoying and Jimmy when they argue. Kait helps Dani out with anything she does and sometimes does a girly chat with her but she never actually got it when she first had it with Dani. She loves riding on her horse Prince William and will do anything to keep him safe. Kait finds Jimmy very annoying when they both argue a lot about whether their plan might work or not. When Rich arrives in the castle, she starts to fall in love with him and in series 2, Kait and Rich had a fake wedding planned. In series 2 it is obvious that she and Rich have crushes on one another. In "Save Our Station" Kaitlin and Rich finally admit their feelings for each other, and they start a relationship. Also, Dani revealed that she was never going to come home as she had decided to stay in Hollywood, therefore she gave her part of the castle to Kait. In "That Sinking Feeling", Rich ruins Titanic for Kait by giving away the ending, causing an argument. Kait threw all of Rich's clothes out of the window in anger. It turned out that Rich was planning a surprise romantic meal for them, however it was ruined when Dylan crashed a bath (which had been made to look like a boat) into the table. This results in an argument, and Kait reveals that she went through Rich's phone, angering Rich, who then suggests that he and Kait go back to being friends, Kait agrees and they break up. In "An Inspector Calls" Kait is nominated for Best Newcomer at the Pet Snack of the Year Awards, and Rich is commissioned by Boys Who Make Noise to write a love song but it doesn't really work. He only gets ideas for his love song by looking at Kait. Before Kait went to the Awards with Clare, Rich took a picture of Kait so he could finish writing his love song. Kait came back with an Award in her hand and Won the Best NewComer Award. He finished his love song and showed it to the gang and during that Kait and Rich gave each other looks. At the end of the song, everyone applauds and loved it especially Kait and soon told Dylan that Rich found his inspiration for writing his love song and his inspiration was Kait. In "Choc Horror", Kait bakes a chocolate cake for Rich, and Rich secretly takes horse riding lessons, in the end they get back together. She is best friends with Dani, Jimmy and Clare, girlfriend of Rich and sister of Leo.

=== Leo ===
Leo (Lorenzo Rodriguez) is one of the residents of Bogmoor and best friends with Esme. Leo and his older sister, Kaitlin have been in Bogmoor for years now when they moved from Manchester. He's very annoying, which Kait describes. He dreams of becoming a famous magician, but his magic tricks always fails and Esme helps him. In "Ghost Tour", he wanted to see the Poltergeist in its closet and it traps him in. When he tries magic at the castle, the parts have been damaged and it angers Dani. Leo didn't return in series 2, it was mentioned by Kait that he had gone to magic school. Leo is Kait's younger brother and Esme's best friend.

=== Esme ===
Esme (Jordan Brown) is another ghost of Bogmoor and is always trying to spook other humans and loves scaring them. In "Treasure Hunt", it is revealed that she and Gabe died a few days before her eleventh birthday after catching the flu. In "Bogmoor Rocks", Esme and Leo compete to see which of them is Jedward's biggest fan, the competition ends in a draw. She's frequently up to mischief with Leo. In "Girl Trouble", Esme was jealous because Dylan had a crush on Fiona. Later, Dylan's bearded dragon, Trafford ate Fiona's stick insect, Ingrid. In Series 3, Esme was demoted from main to recurring. In "Back to Bogmoor", she and Gabe return from the other side. In "The Ghostel", Esme revealed that she only returned to say goodbye, she had decided that she belonged on the other side. Before leaving she gave gifts to Jimmy, Kait and Rich, then told Dylan that her gift to him was a new best friend, after which Esme crossed back over to the other side. In "That Sinking Feeling", Esme and Dylan talked on ghostly book, Dylan asked Esme if she knew anyone in the afterlife who was on the Titanic, Esme didn't know anyone, but she said she would try to find someone. She found Irma and sent her to the Castle. In "Ghost Swappers", Rich spoke to Esme on ghostly book, he told her that he and Kait had become ghosts. Rich showed her posters he had made for Gabe's ghostel and asked her opinion, she didn't like them. Kait teleported into the room scaring Rich, and then said, "I love being a ghost", annoying Esme because it's her own catchphrase. She's the best friend of Dylan and Leo, and sister of Gabe.

=== Rich ===
Rich, played by Richard Wisker is successful and likes to do business. He comes up with crazy ideas for Bogmoor and he has a crush on Kait. In series 2, he sets up Bogmoor FM and soon makes a fake wedding, pretending to marry Kaitlin. He first appeared in "Rich". Rich's crush on Kaitlin is very obvious in "The Beast of Bogmoor" when Jimmy picks the pumpkin that was meant to be on show for Kaitlin. Rich gets angry at Jimmy and tries to make sure Kaitlin doesn't find out that Jimmy took the pumpkin. When Conall Connor turns up Rich becomes jealous. Rich soon comes up with an idea to turn Bogmoor Castle into a romantic wedding venue, and Kait is reluctant to play the part of the bride in the photo shoot. When Jimmy tells Rich to kiss Kaitlin he immediately responses by telling Kait that it would look good for the website. Kait doesn't seem to be against the idea and goes along with it however she doesn't manage to kiss him because of Dylan's bearded dragon Trafford and gets offended. He soon makes it up to her though telling that he likes it when they get along. In "Girl Trouble" it is obvious that he has feelings for Kait as he wrote a song for her. In "Save Our Station" Rich and Kait finally admit their feelings for each other and agree to go on a date. In "That Sinking Feeling", Rich ruined Titanic for Kait by giving away the ending, which resulted in an argument. Rich tried to make it up to Kait, and on Clare's suggestion decided to cook Kait a romantic meal, but Jimmy and Clare did the cooking. Rich and Kait's meal was ruined when Dylan crashed a bath (which had been made to look like a boat), into the table. After this, Rich discovered that Kait had been through his texts, Kait argued that he kept running off without telling her why, then Rich said that they should go back to being friends, Kait agrees and they break up. Kait is nominated for Best Newcomer at the Pet Snack of the Year Awards, and Rich is commissioned by Boys Who Make Noise to write a love song, but has writer's block. but it doesn't really work. He only gets ideas for his love song by looking at Kait. Before Kait went to the Awards with Clare, Rich took a picture of Kait so he could finish writing his love song. He finished his love song and showed it to the gang and during that Kait and Rich gave each other looks. At the end of the song, everyone applauds and loved it especially Kait and soon told Dylan that Rich found his inspiration for writing his love song and his inspiration was Kait. In "Choc Horror", Rich secretly takes horse riding lessons to impress Kait, and Kait bakes a chocolate cake for Rich, in the end they get back together. Rich is the cousin of Dani and Jimmy, brother of Dylan and boyfriend of Kait.

=== Dylan ===
Dylan, played by Toby Murray, is Rich's brother, who first appeared in "Bogmoor FM". He gets up to nothing but trouble and has brought his bearded dragon Trafford and his geckos Drum and Base to keep him company. But he always got Trafford on the lose, like losing him in "Don't Tell The Bride". In "Girl Trouble", he develops a crush on his classmate, Fiona and invites her to the castle to do their school project, and tries to impress her, but ended up bad. He also angry at Esme when she tried to ruin things between him and Fiona, and learnt from her that she's jealous of Fiona, not because she has a crush on him, because she doesn't want to lose her best friend. But Dylan said he'll always be her best friend. In "Back to Bogmoor", Dylan tries to bring Gabe and Esme back home, but Rich tells him to move on and find another best friend. Later, his equipment detects something even though it is not plugged in, the gang rush upstairs then Gabe and Esme cross back over from the other side. In "The Ghostel" Dylan was devastated after Esme revealed that she only returned to say goodbye as she had decided that she belonged on the other side. Before she crossed over, Esme told Dylan that her gift to him was a new best friend, Leonie, who came through shortly after Esme crossed over. Dylan is best friends with Esme and Leonie, the younger brother of Rich and cousin of Jimmy and Dani.

=== Clare ===
Clare, played by Jessica Forrest, first appeared in "Back to Bogmoor". She had just arrived at Bogmoor Castle after travelling the world. She gives Kait an anniversary present to give to Rich which turns out to be a finger trap. Clare was shocked when she found out about the poltergeist, and fainted after Gabe and Esme crossed back over from the other side. In "The Ghostel", Clare hoped that she had just imagined that the castle was haunted, and was terrified after discovering that Gabe and Esme are real. However, later, she realized that they're harmless and she decided to give them a chance. In "The Dead Headz", Clare became a DJ on Bogmoor FM. She had a crush on the lead singer of the Dead Headz, Johnny Nasty, so she decided to co-manage them with Kait, however Clare slowly came to dislike Johnny, and wanted him and his band gone. In "Truth or Scare", Clare suggests a sleepover to help Kait get over her split with Rich. At the sleepover, while playing Truth or Dare, Clare admits that she fancies Jimmy. In "Stupid Cupid", Jimmy and Clare had a date and got together. Clare is Kait's best friend from school and the girlfriend of Jimmy.

=== Leonie ===
Leonie, played by Lucy Hutchinson, is a ghost from the 1970s who loves pranking people. She first appeared in "The Ghostel", Esme revealed that she only returned to say goodbye as she had decided that she belonged on the other side. Before she crossed over, she told Dylan that her gift to him was a new best friend, and shortly after she crossed over Leonie came through from the other side. In "The Dead Headz", after over-hearing that bands were being invited to perform on Bogmoor FM, Leonie decided to invite the Dead Headz, a ghost punk band, to perform, however they make life miserable for everyone. Leonie tries to become best friends with Dylan, but she just upsets him. After this, Leonie decided to leave, but thanks to Rich talking to him, Dylan asks her to stay and she happily agrees. She is very similar to Esme - causing trouble, making mischief with Dylan. In "That Sinking Feeling", she helps Dylan tell Irma, a ghost from the Titanic, to understand that the Titanic did sink. In "Truth or Scare", she and Dylan have a prank war with Kait and Clare. In "Ghost Swappers", Leonie (and Gabe) became human, she asked Clare to help her dress as if she is from the 21st Century, so she can go and make friends in Bogmoor. This ends badly due to Clare's less than typical dress sense. In the end, Leonie became a ghost again. Leonie is best friends with Dylan.

== Supporting characters ==
=== Roxy ===
Roxy (Shannon Flynn) is a mouse that lives under Bogmoor Castle with Diego. She first appears in the second series. She is cheeky and annoying. She likes loud music and doesn't like when Diego doesn't want to do the things that she wants to do. In Series 3, Roxy was devastated after Diego was eaten by a cat. It was mentioned that she asked Carlos to come and stay, but didn't tell him that the castle had ghosts, as she thought he wouldn't come if she did tell him.

=== Carlos ===
Carlos (Niall Wright) is another mouse that lives under Bogmoor Castle with Roxy. He appeared in the third series to replace Diego, who was eaten by a cat. Carlos is frightened at everything, like Roxy's pranks and cats. Roxy asked him to come and stay, but she didn't tell him that the castle had ghosts or else he wouldn't have come.

=== Diego ===
Diego (Richard Wisker) is the other mouse that lives under Bogmoor Castle with Roxy. He appeared in the second series. He's grumpy and quiet. He loves yoga and likes listening to yoga music. He dislikes loud music and Roxy's games and her annoyance. He doesn't appear in the third series, it was mentioned that he was eaten by a cat, which devastated Roxy.

== Dani's House characters ==
=== Sam ===
Sam (Klariza Clayton) makes an appearance in "Ghost Tour", where she now works for the government in Area 52, investigating ghosts and UFOs.

=== Ben ===
Ben (James Gandhi) makes an appearance in "21st Century Boy" where he is challenged by Gabe to a duel to fight for Dani's love.

=== Max ===
Max (Sebastian Applewhite) appears in archive footage in "21st Century Boy", and he was mentioned by Ben and Dani in the same episode.
