= Dani's Castle series 1 =

Dani's Castle
- Series 1
- No. of episodes: 13

Release
- Original network: CBBC Channel
- Original release: 17 January – 18 April 2013

Series chronology
- Next → Series 2

The first series of Dani's Castle aired on 17 January 2013 and it was a spin-off from CBBC's popular series Dani's House. The series stars Dani Harmer as Dani, Kieran Alleyne as Jimmy, Niall Wright as Gabe, Shannon Flynn as Kaitlin, Lorenzo Rodriguez as Leo and Jordan Brown as Esme. It takes of when Dani has left her house and has moved on to a new life in Bogmoor. Dani has inherited a castle from Aunt Marjorie she didn't know she had. But as soon as she arrives, she gets more than she bargained for. In "Rich", Lorenzo Rodriguez makes his last appearance as Leo, and Richard Wisker guest stars as Rich.

== Cast ==
=== Main cast ===
- Dani Harmer as Dani
- Kieran Alleyne as Jimmy
- Niall Wright as Gabe
- Shannon Flynn as Kait
- Lorenzo Rodriguez as Leo
- Jordan Brown as Esme

== Episodes ==
No. overall	No. in series	Title	Directed by	Written by	Original release date	UK viewers (millions)
1	1	"The Castle"	Dez McCarthy	Paul Rose	17 January 2013	0.454
Dani inherits a castle in Ireland from a long lost aunt but gets more than she bargained for when she arrives. Is the castle really hers or will she have to untangle the branches of her family tree? An unknown cousin in the shape of accident-prone Jimmy has claimed the castle as his own. With no mobile signals, how can Dani communicate with her best friends? Dani doesn't even know where her home is back in the UK - since her mum and dad have sold it to go with her popstar brother Max on his world trip. How can she survive? At least Dani has a new friend - the daughter of the landlord, Kait. She has a horse named Prince William and has a wannabe-magician brother, Leo. Not to mention a new admirer who materialises when she meets some other very distant and very ghostly family members Gabe and Esme who have lived in the castle for 250 years. Do humans and ghosts mix? But later, Dani finds that her aunt Marjorie has left piles of unpaid bills and debts. If they don't pay in time, the council will have to sell the castle.
2	2	"City Boy"	Dez McCarthy	Gary Parker	24 January 2013	0.452
An escaped pig causes havoc in the castle. Jimmy decides to rescue the little pig from being the main course at the Annual Bogmoor Ball. Jimmy soon realises that living in the countryside is way different than living in the city - so Jimmy tries to prove to Kaitlyn that he can be a vegetarian for the whole day. But. when he finds out that one of the little pigs is going to be killed and eaten at the ball, Jimmy decides to steal it and hide it from Kaitlyn. Dani finds out that she is "Lady of The Castle", so she is the one that organises the ball. She hires a dance partner to get some dancing lessons but he seems odd and weird. Can she open the Bogmoor Ball, or will everyone think that she is not a Bogmoor inheritance at all?
3	3	"Ghost Tour"	Dez McCarthy	Paul Rose	31 January 2013	0.343
The gang have to lower their debts, so Jimmy's ghost tour idea makes them a lot of money. Sam comes to hangout with Dani, but Sam cares more about her job then hanging out with her best friend.
4	4	"21st Century Boy"	Bruce Webb	Paul Rose	7 February 2013	0.398
Dani admits her true feelings for Gabe, but he thinks he needs to update himself to win her affection. A surprise visit from Ben suggests Gabe has competition. Gabe turns to Jimmy who helps him add a unique street style to Gabe's old school ways. The result is a bit of a disaster, which doesn't go down well with anyone, especially Dani. To save face, Gabe challenges Ben to a dual to win back her affections.
5	5	"The Lying Game"	Bruce Webb	Katie Douglas	14 February 2013	0.437
Esme suffers a crisis of confidence in her scare ability. Gabe's addiction to GhostlyBook causes Dani to do something rash. Can anyone tell the truth in the castle? Meanwhile, Jimmy's best friend comes for a visit.
6	6	"Treasure Hunt"	Bruce Webb	Dan Berlinka	21 February 2013	0.255
Jimmy finds ancient clues to hidden treasure in the castle, and the gang search high and low only to discover something completely unexpected. Gabe is very much against this, and does everything in his power to stop them, but he has a good reason.
7	7	"Bogmoor Rocks"	Ian Curtis	Paul Rose	28 February 2013	0.215
Another money-making scheme goes sour, when bad weather forces the cancellation of Bogmoor's rock festival - but has anyone told Jedward? Meanwhile, Jimmy tries to run away after he and Dani fight.
8	8	"Dark and Stormy Night"	Ian Curtis	Dan Berlinka	7 March 2013	0.448
Strange things happen when the lights go out in a storm. A stranger named Cedric was blocked by the storm, so he comes in the castle. He told Jimmy that he has come here to inherit the castle. Jimmy was shocked. Meanwhile, Gabe and Dani start fighting, which makes Dani get stuck in the cellar. But a spooky feeling happens when Cedric wasn't a human at all. What was he?
9	9	"Witch World"	Ian Curtis	Gary Parker	21 March 2013	0.345
Dani and Jimmy must each defend their branch of the family tree when a misunderstanding with local Mrs Crankett tells a legend of Bogmoor. Jimmy thinks that he should turn the castle into a witch world in order to become rich, but Dani forces him not to. Otherwise everyone in the village will think that Dani is a witch. She reads a tale of a lady named Lavinia about her brother getting rid of her sister, is it because she was a witch, or was the witch not Lady Lavinia at all?
10	10	"Bogmoor Birthday"	Dez McCarthy	Katie Douglas	28 March 2013	0.295
Jimmy fakes his birthday to get out of the cleaning of the castle. Meanwhile, after an interview of Prince William and Kaitlyn is broadcast, a man comes to the castle claiming to be Prince William's owner. We find out that Katlin never bought him, but instead found her beloved horse. But something's not right with this mysterious man, who is he and how is he going to prove he's Prince William's owner?
11	11	"Communication Problems"	Dez McCarthy	Max Allen	4 April 2013	0.238
Kaitlyn protests at yet another harebrained Jimmy ultra schemes, which involves a massive satellite dish, phone signals and crossed wires. Can things return to normal before Dani returns from her audition? Meanwhile Esme doesn't know whether to ditch her human friends or go and join The Spectral Sisterhood.
12	12	"Aunt Majorie"	Dez McCarthy	Julia Kent	11 April 2013	0.210
Aunt Marjorie returns from the dead to give Dani and Jimmy her piece of her mind. With their troublesome cousins fighting and arguing all day, Aunt Marjorie returns and Gabe disappears. So Dani and Jimmy must solve their problems in time to save Gabe. The gang review some highs and lows of their time. Note: Clips from throughout Series 1 are featured.
13	13	"Rich"	Dez McCarthy	Paul Rose	18 April 2013	0.322
Dani, Jimmy, Kaitlyn, Leo, Gabe and Esme get another visitor and another cousin coming to claim the castle. Dani and Gabe have a tough decision to make as Dani leaves the castle for a big audition in Hollywood. Dani gets the part but is reluctant to leave her friends, especially Gabe. As Dani prepares to leave the castle Gabe gives her a special gift to say goodbye, as the Poltergeist gets his revenge.
