= Dani's Castle series 2 =

Dani's Castle
- Series 2
- No. of episodes: 13

Release
- Original network: CBBC Channel
- Original release: 14 November 2013 – 3 October 2014

Series chronology
- ← Previous; Series 1 Next → Series 3

The second series of Dani's Castle aired from 14 November 2013 to 3 October 2014 on the CBBC Channel. The series mainly focuses on Bogmoor Castle other than Dani fitting in since Dani has moved on as a Hollywood Star. But Bogmoor Castle is still her home so she keeps in touch with the gang via webcam. The series stars Dani Harmer as Dani, Kieran Alleyne as Jimmy, Niall Wright as Gabe, Shannon Flynn as Kait, Jordan Brown as Esme, and introduces newcomers Toby Murray as Dylan and Richard Wisker as Rich.

== Cast ==
=== Main cast ===
- Richard Wisker as Rich
- Shannon Flynn as Kait
- Niall Wright as Gabe
- Kieran Alleyne as Jimmy
- Jordan Brown as Esme
- Toby Murray as Dylan
- Dani Harmer as Dani

=== Supporting cast ===
- Dani Harmer as Dani
- Richard Wisker as Diego
- Shannon Flynn as Roxy

== Episodes ==
No. overall	No. in series	Title	Directed by	Written by	Original release date	UK viewers (millions)
14	1	"Bogmoor FM"	Rebecca Gatward	Paul Rose	14 November 2013	0.442
Rich comes up with a truly brilliant business idea for the castle when he enlists the help of the gang to establish their own radio station. Surprisingly, Gabe launches the station into an overnight success - but the locals don't realise that the star on Bogmoor FM is actually a ghost. Later, Rich finds out that he has to look after Dylan whilst their parents set off to the Amazon rainforest.
15	2	"The Beast of Bogmoor"	Rebecca Gatward	Ian Curtis	15 November 2013	0.360
Kait enters the annual Bogmoor Fair's Best Fruit and Vegetable Competition. When Gabe resurrects the legend of the Beast of Bogmoor, Dylan decides to try and track it down. She believes the legend is nothing but a story whipped up by jealous villagers to discredit her grandfather's giant vegetables.
16	3	"Hey Mr DJ"	Rebecca Gatward	Christine Murphy	21 November 2013	0.383
The radio station is not up to Rich's standards, and believes it could be better; so he runs a DJ bootcamp to train the gang to be they can be. Kait falls for the charms of new star Conall Connor, but she soon realises he is not what he seems: she even finds out he uses autotune for his voice. After getting rid of Conall, Kait and Rich realise they have a lot of things in common.
17	4	"Don't Tell The Bride"	Rebecca Gatward	Bronagh Taggart	22 November 2013	0.310
Wedding bells are in the air, as Rich decides to rent the castle out as a romantic wedding venue. But first, he needs to create a fake wedding for his website to show off its possibilities; so the gang are all assigned roles for a photo-shoot. What could go wrong?
18	5	"Boys V Girls"	Delyth Thomas	Paul Rose	28 November 2013	0.433
Tensions rise when the gang are split into two teams to play Boy vs Girls. The teams battle it up to see which gender is the best of all.
19	6	"Mostly Haunted"	Delyth Thomas	Paul Rose	29 November 2013	0.362
A celebrity ghost hunter visits the castle for his TV show, but is not convinced that it's haunted; so the gang try their best to prove that it is.
20	7	"Location, Location, Location"	Delyth Thomas	James Cary	5 December 2013	0.293
Dani is up for a big part in a new Hollywood movie; but when Rich finds out they need a castle as a location, he convinces her to send the producer to Bogmoor. He even wants to sign the contract without even reading the script. Dylan and Gabe try to get him to read the small print in time; but will the castle literally explode under all the pressure?
21	8	"Bogmoor's Got Talent"	Delyth Thomas	Bronagh Taggart	6 December 2013	0.285
When Dylan fails to get a part in the school play, it's up to Rich and the gang to raise his spirits by helping him find his unique skill. They decide to run a talent competition for the village, so Dylan realises he's not such a loser after all.
22	9	"Too Few Cooks"	Dez McCarthy	Max Allen	12 December 2013	0.323
Gabe proves to have an unlikely talent as a ghost chef when he serves up a home cooked dinner to the gang, and Kait thinks there might be something positive in setting up a restaurant at Bogmoor - but Rich lays claim to the idea and pushes the gang into the background as his plans take place..
23	10	"Girl Trouble"	Dez McCarthy	Paul Rose	13 December 2013	0.275
Dylan is not feeling well; with cold sweat, dryness of mouth and no appetite - all seemingly caused by a girl called Fiona. The gang realise the illness he is actually suffering from is love-sickness. But, when trying to help Dylan how to deal with a crush, Esme gets jealous and plays tricks on Fiona. Meanwhile, Kait and Rich find their feelings for each other when he writes her a love song.
24	11	"Castle Keep"	Dez McCarthy	Max Allen	18 December 2013	0.316
Rich is really feeling the pressure of keeping Bogmoor Castle running - so when an Australian billionaire offers a load of money to relocate the castle to Sydney, Rich can't believe his luck. Gabe tries to convince Rich the castle means more than money, but Rich tries to convince Gabe that keeping the place together is harder than it looks. When he takes a sharp knock on the head, Rich gets new insight into the history of the castle and its true value to the family - but is it all a dream?
25	12	"Save Our Station"	Dez McCarthy	Paul Rose	18 December 2013	0.364
When Mayor McGonnigle tries to close down Bogmoor FM, the gang try to get help from the media and celebrities to raise awareness of the threat. However, Rich and Jimmy are offered jobs on a bigger and better station; Swagger FM. Meanwhile Dani says that she's not coming back, so Gabe decides to crossover to the Other Side and convinces Esme to do the same, so it's up to Kait and Dylan to try to save the station and the castle - with the help of special guest, Lindsey Russell.
26	13	"The Cast and the Castle"	Dez McCarthy	N/A	31 October 2014	0.190
Dani and the gang are interviewed, and reveal some secrets of Bogmoor Castle. Meanwhile, Rich has some questions for Gabe on Bogmoor FM show, "Dead Famous". Note: Clips from throughout Series 2 are featured.
