= List of Dani's Castle episodes =

Dani's Castle is a British children's comedy-drama which started airing on the CBBC Channel and ABC3 on 17 January 2013. It stars Dani Harmer, Shannon Flynn, Kieran Alleyne, Lorenzo Rodriguez, Niall Wright, Jordan Brown, Richard Wisker, Toby Murray, Jessica Forrest and Lucy Hutchinson. It's a spin-off of Dani's House. In Series 3, the show is informally titled Rich Jimmy & Kait's Castle, due to Dani Harmer's exit at the end of Series 2.

== Series overview ==
Series	Episodes	Originally released	
Series	Episodes	First released	Last released
1	13	17 January 2013	18 April 2013
2	13	14 November 2013	31 October 2014
3	13	7 July 2015	15 December 2015

== Episodes ==
=== Series 1 (2013) ===
No. overall	No. in series	Title	Directed by	Written by	Original release date	UK viewers (millions)
1	1	"The Castle"	Dez McCarthy	Paul Rose	17 January 2013	0.454
2	2	"City Boy"	Dez McCarthy	Gary Parker	24 January 2013	0.452
3	3	"Ghost Tour"	Dez McCarthy	Paul Rose	31 January 2013	0.343
4	4	"21st Century Boy"	Bruce Webb	Paul Rose	7 February 2013	0.398
5	5	"The Lying Game"	Bruce Webb	Katie Douglas	14 February 2013	0.437
6	6	"Treasure Hunt"	Bruce Webb	Dan Berlinka	21 February 2013	0.255
7	7	"Bogmoor Rocks"	Ian Curtis	Paul Rose	28 February 2013	0.215
8	8	"Dark and Stormy Night"	Ian Curtis	Dan Berlinka	7 March 2013	0.448
9	9	"Witch World"	Ian Curtis	Gary Parker	21 March 2013	0.345
10	10	"Bogmoor Birthday"	Dez McCarthy	Katie Douglas	28 March 2013	0.295
11	11	"Communication Problems"	Dez McCarthy	Max Allen	4 April 2013	0.238
12	12	"Aunt Majorie"	Dez McCarthy	Julia Kent	11 April 2013	0.210
13	13	"Rich"	Dez McCarthy	Paul Rose	18 April 2013	0.322

=== Series 2 (2013–14) ===
No. overall	No. in series	Title	Directed by	Written by	Original release date	UK viewers (millions)
14	1	"Bogmoor FM"	Rebecca Gatward	Paul Rose	14 November 2013	0.442
15	2	"The Beast of Bogmoor"	Rebecca Gatward	Ian Curtis	15 November 2013	0.360
16	3	"Hey Mr DJ"	Rebecca Gatward	Christine Murphy	21 November 2013	0.383
17	4	"Don't Tell The Bride"	Rebecca Gatward	Bronagh Taggart	22 November 2013	0.310
18	5	"Boys V Girls"	Delyth Thomas	Paul Rose	28 November 2013	0.433
19	6	"Mostly Haunted"	Delyth Thomas	Paul Rose	29 November 2013	0.362
20	7	"Location, Location, Location"	Delyth Thomas	James Cary	5 December 2013	0.293
21	8	"Bogmoor's Got Talent"	Delyth Thomas	Bronagh Taggart	6 December 2013	0.285
22	9	"Too Few Cooks"	Dez McCarthy	Max Allen	12 December 2013	0.323
23	10	"Girl Trouble"	Dez McCarthy	Paul Rose	13 December 2013	0.275
24	11	"Castle Keep"	Dez McCarthy	Max Allen	18 December 2013	0.316
25	12	"Save Our Station"	Dez McCarthy	Paul Rose	18 December 2013	0.364
26	13	"The Cast and the Castle"	Dez McCarthy	N/A	31 October 2014	0.190

=== Series 3 (2015) ===
No. overall	No. in series	Title	Directed by	Written by	Original release date	UK viewers (millions)
27	1	"Back to Bogmoor"	Dez McCarthy	Paul Rose	7 July 2015	0.188
28	2	"The Ghostel"	Dez McCarthy	Paul Rose	14 July 2015	0.159
29	3	"The Dead Headz"	Beryl Richards	Paul Rose	21 July 2015	Under 0.153
30	4	"That Sinking Feeling"	Dez McCarthy	Emma Ko	28 July 2015	Under 0.154
31	5	"Truth or Scare"	Diarmuid Goggins	Bronagh Taggart	4 August 2015	Under 0.180
32	6	"Ghost Swappers"	Diarmuid Goggins	Paul Rose	11 August 2015	Under 0.187
33	7	"An Inspector Calls"	Diarmuid Goggins	Mark Evans	18 August 2015	Under 0.168
34	8	"Groundbog Day"	Diarmuid Goggins	Bronagh Taggart	25 August 2015	Under 0.192
35	9	"Midsummer Night's Nightmare"	Beryl Richards	Mark Evans	1 September 2015	0.220
36	10	"Stupid Cupid"	Dez McCarthy	Naomi Smith & Jessica Silcock	8 September 2015	0.205
37	11	"Choc Horror"	Beryl Richards	Paul Rose	15 September 2015	0.294
38	12	"Ghostwriter"	Beryl Richards	Bronagh Taggart	22 September 2015	Under 0.181
39	13	"It's A Wonderful Afterlife"	Beryl Richards	Paul Rose	15 December 2015	Under 0.252
