= List of Dani's House episodes =

Dani's House is a British children's comedy-drama series broadcast on CBBC and starring Dani Harmer. The first series premiered on 26 September 2008, and its fifth series concluded on 19 July 2012. It has received several awards and nominations from BAFTA Kids. A spin-off called Dani's Castle began airing in 2013. A total of 65 episodes aired over the five series.

== Series overview ==
Series	Episodes	Originally released	
Series	Episodes	First released	Last released
1	13	26 September 2008	19 December 2008
2	13	30 November 2009	19 March 2010
3	13	10 September 2010	3 December 2010
4	13	16 September 2011	9 December 2011
5	13	29 April 2012	19 July 2012

== Episodes ==
=== Series 1 (2008) ===
No. overall	No. in season	Title	Directed by	Written by	Original release date	UK viewers
1	1	"Pirates"	Dez Mccarthy	Paul Rose	26 September 2008	231,000
Dani is in a dilemma. Just when Dani and Max were caught fighting, Dani accidentally breaks her mum's favourite vase. She doesn't have enough money to repair it so she goes out to find a job leaving Sam and Toby to look after the "Baby From Hell". Later, Max pretends that he found an old treasure map and that there is buried treasure in the house. Dani falls for it since she is desperate to find money so she can repair the vase before she gets home.
2	2	"Best Friends"	Dez Mccarthy	Joe Williams	3 October 2008	163,000
Dani, Sam and Toby were looking forward to a Mexican party. Then, Dani's mum calls and says that she has to stay in and look after Max and the "Baby from Hell". So Sam and Toby go off without Dani. Dani feels like she was ignored, more like invisible. Sam and Toby have been talking to each other and hanging out without Dani. Dani then says that she'll be going out to a movie premiere with Daniel Radcliffe, only to make Sam and Toby jealous. Meanwhile, Max and Ben try to get their water pistols back from Dani.
3	3	"Luck"	Jeremy Wooding	Paul Rose	10 October 2008	202,000
Dani has got an audition today but she can't find her lucky socks. Every time she wears them, her auditions are always a success. When Sam and Toby help Dani search for her lucky socks, Sam tries to convince Dani that there is no such thing as luck. But Dani tries every single lucky charm and it still doesn't work. Later, more bad luck happens when Dani walks through the ladder and Toby opens an umbrella inside. Meanwhile, Max is winning a lot of prizes from Ben's fantastic comments. But how did he win every single prize? How is he so lucky?
4	4	"Killer Party"	Dez Mccarthy	Holly Lyons	17 October 2008	263,000
It's Dani's birthday and Dani can't wait for the presents that Sam and Toby are going to give her. But they don’t, they don’t even celebrate that night. Instead, Dani entertains herself by watching a horror movie (of herself). The next day, Dani overhears Sam and Toby planning an assassination just because Dani ruined their phone calls. When actually, Sam and Toby were planning a surprise party. Meanwhile, Max tries to get all of Dani's birthday presents.
5	5	"Sleepover"	Dez Mccarthy	Emma Ko	24 October 2008	178,000
Dani is auditioning for Grease and Sam has got a science reset because she failed her last exam. So Dani agrees that Sam should stay for a sleepover so she can revise the periodic table in peace. Max is stressed that he will be sharing the house with two girls, so he asks Ben if he could stay over as well. Dani says that Sam has not been the best room-mate to Toby. So Dani teaches Sam about the periodic table. Meanwhile, Zang and Zark have got a lot of cleaning up to do.
6	6	"Ghost Mutterer"	Dez Mccarthy	Emma Ko	31 October 2008	265,000
It is Hallowe'en but Dani is in a Halloween "hum-bugness" since that she doesn't have a Hallowe'en spirit. Sam and Toby try to light her up while Toby is selling his Hallowe'en t-shirts. Max and Ben plan to go trick-o-treating but Dani won't let them. So Max, Ben, Sam and Toby try to scare Dani into believing that a ghost is out to get her for not having a Hallowe'en spirit. Dani hires a ghost exterminator to catch the ghost. But when the weird ghost exterminator comes, she just might be a ghost.
7	7	"Amnesia"	Jeremy Wooding	Paul Rose	7 November 2008	221,000
Toby and Dani are set to enter the 'Utterly Go Dancing' heats, but when Dani takes a fall, she is left unable to remember any of the moves... or anything, for that matter (even her own name). Max is especially worried – how will he get his favourite CD back if Dani cannot remember the combination to the safe she locked it in?
8	8	"Snakes"	Dez Mccarthy	Paul Rose	14 November 2008	261,000
Toby's pet-sitting service comes under threat when his snake escapes in Dani's house. With Dani's phobia of snakes and Max desperate to fund a record deal for Ben, there is enough screaming in the house to wake an irritable and jet-lagged Aunt Sheila.
9	9	"Toby No-Mates"	Dez Mccarthy	Kay Stonham	21 November 2008	242,000
Dani is determined to prove to Toby that girls can find mates for guys – even if she has to be the guy herself. Meanwhile, the tables are turned with Ben finally whooping Max at computer games, leaving Max feeling like the bumbling loser. With the girls being far too obsessed with Orlando Bloom for him to hang out with them 24/7, Toby eventually finds a mate in the most unexpected place.
10	10	"It's Not Easy Being Green"	Dez Mccarthy	Paul Mckenzie	28 November 2008	247,000
Sam is doing a green school project and dares Dani and Toby to cut their carbon footprint. Can Toby survive without all his electronic gizmos? Max and Ben offer to offset some of his carbon as their latest moneymaking scheme. Do they know what they are letting themselves in for?
11	11	"Celebrity"	Jeremy Wooding	Emma Ko	5 December 2008	227,000
Dani's old acting friend Mo White visits and turns out to be super-famous. Leaving Toby and Sam speechless and starstruck, much to Dani's annoyance. Max and Ben meanwhile, have a cunning plan to use Mo to help them with a get rich quick scheme, but their scheme lands them in mega-trouble.
12	12	"Snowed In!"	Jeremy Wooding	Kay Stonham	12 December 2008	217,000
Dani and Max are snowed in alone, at each other's throats at the best of times. How will they survive the claustrophobia of having to spend a whole day in each other's company? Plus, there is no food and no heating. Who will trudge through the snow first to save the two from themselves – Sam, Toby, or a very lost Ben?
13	13	"House for Sale"	Dez Mccarthy	Paul Rose	19 December 2008	151,000
The friends discover to their horror that Dani's house is up for sale – at least if Max and his greedy mentor, estate agent Edgar Molloy have anything to do with it. Can Dani scupper their plans or is this the end for Dani's friendship?

=== Series 2 (2009–10) ===
No. overall	No. in season	Title	Directed by	Written by	Original release date	UK viewers
14	1	"Jack in the House"	Dez Mccarthy	Paul Rose	30 November 2009	182,000
Dani has moved house and finds out that she has been offered a record deal to celebrate she throws a massive party for all her mates, but finds everything thrown into chaos when the oddly-familiar DJ Jack causes mayhem. Meanwhile, Dani's brother Max plans to embarrass his big sister and ruin her party, just as soon as he can find out why his best friend Ben is under investigation by a secret agent.
15	2	"Wedding Dress"	Dez McCarthy	Holly Lyons	30 November 2009	374,000
Dani is rehearsing for a romantic role but cannot quite get into the part. When a hassled Sam has to leave her very demanding sister's wedding dress in Dani's care, Dani sees the perfect opportunity for some role play. But can Dani and Jack be relied upon to keep the dress pristine, especially when Max and Ben are having an ongoing prank war?
16	3	"Hit the Jackpot"	Dez McCarthy	Emma Ko	1 December 2009	241,000
Dani needs to raise her profile but Sam and Jack's attempts to help her create a perfect pop promo may not have the required effect. Meanwhile, Max is in need of cash and decides he has the perfect solution – appearing on top quiz show Family Misfunctions. The first problem? Max will need his sister to appear with him. The second problem? Max and Dani find themselves up against top contestants Erik and Erika, who haven't lost a quiz in 19 years.
17	4	"Abracadisco"	Graeme Harper	Trevor Neal & Simon Hickson	1 December 2009	341,000
Jack needs a new gimmick for his gigs. Despite Dani and Sam's doubts, he decides to become a DJ-gician, a combination DJ and magician. All he needs now is an audience to test himself on. At the same time, Max has decided that the perfect way to get what he wants is to act like a five-year-old. The plan works beautifully until Max discovers an old toy and realises how much it means to him. Things come to a head when Jack decides the toy would be perfect for his sawing-in-half trick. Note- The Cat From Hell, is in this episode, but this time approaches Ben.
18	5	"Double Trouble"	Dez McCarthy	Joe Williams	2 December 2009	273,000
Sam and Jack are tired of Dani ditching them for auditions and try-outs, so she promises faithfully that she won't let them down again. When the perfect audition clashes with a date with her mates, Dani has to find a way out fast. Luckily she runs into Maggie, who could be her double. Maggie agrees to stand in for Dani but soon turns out to be more trouble than Dani could have imagined, especially when she starts advising Max and Ben on their project to build a space shuttle.
19	6	"Break a Leg"	Graeme Harper	Holly Lyons	2 December 2009	356,000
Sam has written a play; Dani thinks it is dreadful, but doesn't want to hurt her best friend's feelings. Soon, she finds herself agreeing to be the play's star. Desperate for some way to get out of her new role, Dani pretends to have broken her leg. A suspicious Sam decides to test her friend out. Meanwhile, Max has managed to con his friend Ben out of his lucky medallion, but soon comes to think that, far from being lucky, it may actually be cursed!
20	7	"The Axolotl Factor"	Dez McCarthy	Paul Rose	3 December 2009	228,000
Dani could finally be getting her big break. Top talent spotter Guy Flannel has heard her voice and thinks she might have the Z factor. But can Dani play along when Guy decides he wants her best friend Sam to be his new star?
21	8	"Lady and the Vamp"	Dez McCarthy	Paul Rose	3 December 2009	342,000
Dani has never found dancing lessons easy, but things are made an awful lot worse when Jack gets it into his head that her new dance teacher is a vampire. With Max working out a dastardly scheme for revenge involving super-itchy fleas and some ultra-cute kittens, things could be about to worsen.
22	9	"Use Your Noodle"	Graeme Harper	Paul Rose	4 December 2009	270,000
Dani has become the face of Noodle Puffs. Jack is delighted but Sam is appalled: Noodle Puffs are unhealthy and made from endangered dugong milk. Sam decides she must put an end to Dani's career in advertising and Max immediately volunteers to help out. Meanwhile, Ben has won a top DJ deck in a Noodle Puffs competition and Jack decides to give him lessons. Note- The Cat From Hell is back again in this Episode.
23	10	"Secret Millionaire"	Graeme Harper	Joe Williams	4 December 2009	349,000
Thanks to a mix-up, Dani and Sam come to believe that Jack is a secret millionaire – it would explain his eccentric behaviour and shabby dress sense, after all. When someone claiming to collect money for Booties for Pooches latches onto Jack, Dani assumes she is a gold digger and decides to expose her. Meanwhile, Max and Ben are having a very sticky time of it as a plan to become sweet makers becomes too tasty to resist.
24	11	"Alien Invasion"	Dez McCarthy	Paul Rose	14 December 2009	344,000
Dani is the understudy of the part of a witch in Macbeth: The Musical, which means Jack and Sam get the job of ensuring that Max does not cause chaos. Dani's most loyal viewers, the aliens, have got bored of never getting to meet their heroine and her pals and have decided to teleport down to Earth, where they soon find themselves embroiled in Max's scheme to win the 10,000 pound reward from the UFO Society.
25	12	"Scrooge Tube"	Dez McCarthy	Paul Rose	21 December 2009	398,000
It is Christmas Eve and Dani and the gang get to welcome old pal Toby back from University. Meanwhile, Dani's brother Max is getting into the yuletide spirit – and demanding many presents. But that night, Max is visited by a series of ghosts, who do their best to teach him the real meaning of Christmas.
26	13	"Marathon Man"	Graeme Harper	Joe Williams	16 September 2010	380,000
A very useless Jack, wants to run a marathon for Sport Relief. In addition to this, Dani and Sam try him to help him with his training and would like to sponsor him much of their donation money. Meanwhile, Max and Ben set up a website for Jack's running marathon which gets loads of donations given for Charity. Ben and Max are caught with the money and Dani takes the money from them and empties Max's pockets filled with the rest of the money. Last Appearance- The Cat From Hell [Who is Mentioned in Series 5] Note- The Cat From Hell is absent but it is still his final appearance.

=== Series 3 (2010) ===
No. overall	No. in season	Title	Directed by	Written by	Original release date	UK viewers
27	1	"Weird Wednesday"	Dez McCarthy	Story by : Melanie Martinez; Teleplay by : Paul Rose	17 September 2010	327,000
Life continues for Sam and Jack as Dani and Max's endless fighting is still ongoing. Determined to stop them, Sam and Jack along with Ben decide that Max and Dani should swap places for the day. But Dani has to have an important audtition and Max is competing in Chess Fess. How can the siblings do each other's work when they are like enemies?
28	2	"Chat Show"	Dez McCarthy	Simon Nickson & Trevor Neal	17 September 2010	293,000
Dani enters a Chat show which that means she gets to be on live TV. But when she goes on things get embarrassing.
29	3	"Grandad and the Emo of Doom"	Graeme Harper	Paul Rose	24 September 2010	293,000
An Emo called Brandon Noir comes to stay with Dani, and Max invites their Grandpa to come and stay just to annoy Dani. Grandpa is afraid that Dani is too young to sing with a rock star so Grandpa, Max and Jack decides to sabotage the show. Absent: James Gandhi as Ben
30	4	"The Cook Off"	Dez McCarthy	Emma Ko	1 October 2010	424,000
Sam, Jack and Dani enter the Junior Cook off which turns into a cut-throat competition. Meanwhile, Max and Ben invent Dreams R' Us and they steal Dani, Sam and Jack's food items to invent it. Blind to Max and Ben's robbery, the friends start blaming each other and then all of them end up losing!
31	5	"Only Child"	Graeme Harper	Gary Parker	8 October 2010	297,000
In a rash moment which she thinks is just a joke, Dani says she wishes Max would disappear. Amazingly, he does – and Dani is full of remorse as she tries to get him to come home. Little does she know that he is hidden in the attic with Ben's help, determined to make Dani miss him for real.
32	6	"Book Squirm"	Graeme Harper	Joe Williams	15 October 2010	354,000
When the local Library closes down, Dani reluctantly agrees to set up the library in her house. With Sam and Jack's help, she turns it into a hip and happening reading place, but just before the Mayor comes to inspect how well she's doing, the entire place starts to fall apart.
33	7	"Maxworld"	Graeme Harper	Paul Rose	22 October 2010	341,000
Max decides to lock Dani, Sam and Jack in Dani's bedroom so they can sort out their differences, but it is all just a plot so he can take over the house and turn it into his very own theme park. When some local bullies arrive and start throwing their weight around, Max is forced to enlist the help of Dani and her friends to get rid of them.
34	8	"Driving Miss Dani"	Graeme Harper	Harwant Bains	29 October 2010	280,000
Dani wants to learn how to drive, but can't afford proper lessons. When Max and Ben get hold of a new driving game, Dani becomes completely obsessed and can't be stopped from playing it day and night. Max has to join forces with Jack and Sam to cure Dani of her unlikely new game addiction. Jack's friend then later takes Dani for a driving test, but she fails.
35	9	"Jack's Rival"	Dez McCarthy	Paul Rose	5 November 2010	394,000
An old DJ competitor of Jack's shows up to fix the plumbing at Dani's house, and Dani's lyric book of songs mysteriously goes missing. When Sam and Dani fall for his charm, Max and Ben must become detectives to help Jack prove it's his old nemesis who has nicked the book and is not what he seems.
36	10	"Who Do You Think You Aren't?"	Graeme Harper	Emma Ko	12 November 2010	382,000
Dani discovers a famous branch of her family tree who has definitely lost touch with his roots! The now-famous celebrity comes to visit, but is truly on another wavelength, so the gang contrive a series of lessons to help get him get back to his real self. Guest Starring Kieran Gough
37	11	"Valentine"	Dez McCarthy	James Gandhi	19 November 2010	380,000
Dani is upset that she has no date for Valentine's Day, but Max and Ben (Dressed up as a cherub) are making loads of money delivering flowers and candy to love-struck clients. While Sam is doing research on animal hormones, Dani breaks a bottle by mistake. The 'love potion' falls on Dani and makes her an object of accidental love for, of all people, Ben!
38	12	"Buddy Movie"	Dez McCarthy	Gary Parker	26 November 2010	397,000
Against all odds, Dani gets a part in a big action movie and can take one friend with her to the exotic location. Sam and Jack vie to see who can be Dani's most indispensable friend – but manage to turn her into a selfish and vain wannabe who neither of them end up wanting to be with.
39	13	"ESP"	Dez McCarthy	Paul Rose	3 December 2010	334,000
When Sam does a science experiment on Dani, Sam and Jack are "convinced" that Dani is physic. Jack is convinced that he saw little foot at the door delivering a pizza. Meanwhile, when Max and Ben eavesdrop on the friends, Max lightens things up in the house.

=== Series 4 (2011) ===
No. overall	No. in season	Title	Directed by	Written by	Original release date	UK viewers
40	1	"Achy Breaky Art"	Dez McCarthy	Paul Rose	16 September 2011	318,000
Dani is informed by her boss, Serna, that she'll be getting her big break on McHurties Hospital and that Serna is looking for 'Fear, Joy and Anger' from Dani, for her big part on the soap. Sam, offers to help Dani- but she's only doing it, for her new Science project, with Dani as Subject D. Meanwhile, Max is planning to open an Art Exhibition at the House, and since Ben's picture won heavy cash, wants him to be the artist- With some, funny results! Note- This Episode is actually called 'Achy Breaky Heart' but somehow is called 'Achy Breaky Art' Note- This aired as part of 2011 'CBBC Big Fab Friday'. It was broadcast as a new episode.
41	2	"Love at First Sight"	Dez McCarthy	Holly Lyons	23 September 2011	175,000
Dani meets Nick- who appears to be an handsome boy at a McHurties Hospital party. When she finally meets Nick face to face, he appears to be a smelly, annoying person, and soon Dani wants to break up with him, but realizes that he is Serna's son! Meanwhile, Jack gets two tickets to the Monster Truck Ballet, and Max and Ben, battle to the core, to go to the Ballet with Jack!
42	3	"The Natural"	Dez McCarthy	Gary Parker	30 September 2011	316,000
Jack gets a part on McHurites Hospital, thanks to best friend Dani and Serna comes over to tell him that he is a 'Natural'. Dani is jealous, because Serna hasn't called her a 'Natural' and Jack takes rehearsing McHurties Hospital to his head. Then the two are informed that they have to kiss on TV!
43	4	"We Should Be Heroes"	Simon Hynd	Paul Rose	7 October 2011	312,000
Max is jealous that Dani is a hero to young girls, and decides that he and Ben should be heroes.
44	5	"Hair Today, Gone Tomorrow"	Dez McCarthy	Emma Ko	14 October 2011	324,000
Sam gets Dani and Jack to test her NASA project- Again! Meanwhile, Max is convinced Ben is a werewolf, and takes drastic measures- And makes him stay away from Dani and the autorties- But how can they?- And the lead up to Halloween? Things just get even weirder than usual for Dani and the Gang, as Ben is proven to be a werewolf! But are things just not real?
45	6	"The Big Grapple"	Simon Hynd	Paul Rose	21 October 2011	279,000
Dani is getting tired of eating unhealthly with Jack, and decides to call Jack's friend Ruby to the rescue. But Ruby gets crazy and helps Dani to get healthy to the core, and soon, enters her in a wrestling Match- The only, one problem is that, Dani can't wrestle! At all! How can she possibly wrestle a strong wrestler, when she can't even battle a Cat From Hell? What will she do? Meanwhile, Jack tries to prove to both Dani and Ruby, he is fit, and goes healthy, for one day – But gets caught in Max and Maisy's, competition to make Jack crack into eating junk food again! As if The Cat From Hell, wasn't bad enough! Can Jack survive the whole day without junk food?
46	7	"One Small Step For Sam"	Simon Hynd	Gary Parker	28 October 2011	281,000
47	8	"Sayonara Sam"	Dez McCarthy	Paul Rose	4 November 2011	275,000
It is a typical day at Dani's House. Until, Jack announces, he will be leaving to join the high seas and soon shocking things knock on Dani's door, when an Astronaut is there, from NASA, giving Sam a letter stating that she will not be going to the Moon. But soon she finds out that it was just a test and she will go to the Moon and that she can't tell, Dani or Jack or anyone, or she'll not be going anywhere! What will Sam do? Last Appearance in the Series: Klarisa Clayton- as Sam Note: Klarisa returns in the Series 5 Finale, 'The Birthday Trap' reprising her role as Sam.
48	9	"Pen Pal"	Dez McCarthy	Holly Lyons	11 November 2011	336,000
Jack's Pen Pal from Japan arrives and Dani tries to interfere, fearing that Jack might not be cool enough.
49	10	"They Came From Outer Space...Again"	Simon Hynd	Paul Rose	18 November 2011	430,000
Dani House Fans, Cordinator Zang and Cordinator Zark, are informed by Emperor Zorlok that he will demolish planet Earth, and wants to fight Earth's mightest hero. Then when Jack says he is Earth’s mightest hero [Because he is playing a Dance video game], the two aliens telport themselves to Dani's House again to tell Jack that he has to fight Emperor Zorlok, since they think he is really Earth's Mightest Hero. Meanwhile, Max and Maisy try to get the game, but are being watched carefully by Ruby.
50	11	"A Fine Bromance"	Simon Hynd	Joe Williams	25 November 2011	366,000
Fed up with her nemurous weird, annoying Boyfriends, Ruby is feeling annoyed that her boyfriends are just the same and then Dani The Matchmaker, comes to the rescue, and pairuby up with her cousin who appears to be making a hot Hollywood movie! But soon, Jack starts to hog him and then the three friends fight to get him to themselves! Meanwhile Max and Ben's music video has been turned down by record companies and social media, so they try to up their game by making a love song.
51	12	"Sister Act"	Simon Hynd	Emma Ko	2 December 2011	446,000
Maisy and Ruby are preparing for a family reunion but Maisy finds it boring. She leaves Ruby and helps Dani with an important act. Jack helps Ruby's piano act on his turntables and Maisy helps Dani with her make up and hair which goes terribly wrong. Maisy rips up Danis script probably because she was not concentrating on her performance causing Dani to cut Maisy's bag. Jack can't help Ruby because the day of her family reunion is also Jack day Maisy briefly tries to become brothers with Jack. who agrees than quickly changed his mind. Maisy went back with Ruby. Note: Dani’s act was successful and Coordinator Zang's annoying and boastful brother Administrator Zang comes on the spaceship.
52	13	"Bollywood"	Dez McCarthy	Joe Williams	9 December 2011	389,000
Ben and Dani pair up to compete with Jack and Ruby in a bollywood dance contest- But, when Ruby and Jack enter as well, they seem to be better than the two, and Dani begins to split them up- In order to win! She sends Jack on a wild goose chase, and Maisy is doing the exact same thing- Only she wants to go the Princess of Darkness Launch Night, but Ruby won't take her, thanks to Bollywood. Soon things get from okay-Crazy, when Dani gets a chain of bad luck, and Ruby and Jack get food poisonings! Who is really behind It All?

=== Series 5 (2012) ===
No. overall	No. in season	Title	Directed by	Written by	Original release date	UK viewers
53	1	"Crush and Burn"	Simon Hynd	Paul Rose	26 April 2012	348,000
Maisy tries to take Ben's mind off from missing Max by curing Jack's Hiccups.
54	2	"The Big Snooze"	Simon Hynd	Paul Rose	3 May 2012	284,000
Dani's cousin Megaboyd arrives to try and help Dani with her sleepwalking. Meanwhile, Jack and Ruby run exercise programs.
55	3	"Bunny Tales"	Dez McCarthy	Joe Williams	16 May 2012	274,000
Maisy is determined to win Ben's giant stuffed dinosaur.
56	4	"Two Week Wobblies"	Dez McCarthy	Gary Parker	17 May 2012	282,000
Megaboyd and Maisy have to assemble a multi-gym, with no instructions.
57	5	"B System"	Dez McCarthy	Paul Rose	24 May 2012	145,000
Maisy is excited at the prospect of meeting her pop idol, Bamboo.
58	6	"Dani's Day Off"	Simon Hynd	Joe Williams	31 May 2012	250,000
Dani has to do a big scene at McHurties Hospital with a big bull and becomes really worried- Then Jack and Ruby suggest that Dani takes a day off from work. Meanwhile Megaboyd and Maisy make videos to see who gets the most viewers.
59	7	"Queen of Pranks"	Dez McCarthy	James Gandhi	6 June 2012	410,000
Grandma Judith arrives and can't stop pranking, so Ben and Maisy team up to give her a taste of her own medicine!
60	8	"Doggy Day Afternoon"	Dez McCarthy	Emma Ko	14 June 2012	288,000
Maisy and Megaboyd go to extreme measures to out do each other.
61	9	"Freewheelin"	Dez McCarthy	Joe Williams	21 June 2012	428,000
Maisy and Megaboyd turns Max's Bedroom into a museum.
62	10	"Ben's Girl"	Simon Hynd	Gary Parker	28 June 2012	273,000
Dani thinks that Ben's girlfriend is mean and is determined to prove it.
63	11	"The Missing Present Mystery"	Dez McCarthy	Emma Ko	6 July 2013	231,000
Dani's anniversary present for Alex is missing and she is determined to find the culprit.
64	12	"Alien Examination"	Simon Hynd	Paul Rose	13 July 2013	180,000
The Aliens view the Highlights of Dani's House for their research on Humans.
65	13	"The Birthday Trap"	Dez McCarthy	Paul Rose	20 July 2012	248,000
Tears are at the ready for the final episode of Dani's House. Dani is turning 20 and is inviting her friends over. But she sends the wrong dates for the party on the invitations and Max returns, making Dani think that he's up to no good, but he arrives to tell Dani that he told everyone the right date for the party, and coordinator Zang and Zark teleport Dani's friends to her house. It ends with everyone arguing.
