= Rich, Jimmy & Kait's Castle =

- Series 3
- No. of episodes: 13

Release
- Original network: CBBC Channel
- Original release: 7 July – 15 December 2015

Season chronology
- ← Previous; Series 2

The third series of Dani's Castle aired from 7 July 2015 to 22 September 2015, and then returned on 15 December 2015 for a finale Christmas episode on the CBBC Channel. Dani Harmer did not return as Dani, therefore the show was known as Rich, Jimmy & Kait's Castle. The new series introduced two new characters, Clare played by Jessica Forrest and Leonie played by Lucy Hutchinson. Jordan Brown made her last regular appearance as Esme in "The Ghostel", and then reappeared, although not in person, in "That Sinking Feeling", "Ghost Swappers" and "Midsummer Night's Nightmare", she reappeared in person in "It's A Wonderful Afterlife". Kieran Alleyne was absent in "Truth or Scare", "Ghost Swappers", "An Inspector Calls" and "Groundbog Day". He returned in "Midsummer Night's Nightmare" following his brief absence. In "Choc Horror", Jordan Brown reappeared but did not play Esme, instead playing Elly, a relative of Jimmy, Rich and Dylan. Episode 13, titled "It's A Wonderful Afterlife", was a Christmas Special. This was the final series.

== Cast ==
=== Main cast ===
- Richard Wisker as Rich
- Shannon Flynn as Kait
- Niall Wright as Gabe
- Kieran Alleyne as Jimmy
- Toby Murray as Dylan
- Jessica Forrest as Clare
- Lucy Hutchinson as Leonie (Note: Lucy Hutchinson first appeared in episode 2 and was credited in the opening titles from episode 3.)

=== Supporting cast ===
- Shannon Flynn as Roxy
- Niall Wright as Carlos

=== Recurring cast ===
- Jordan Brown as Esme (Note: While Jordan Brown had multiple appearances in Series 3, she was credited in the opening titles in episode 2, due to this episode being her final regular appearance.)

== Episodes ==
No. overall	No. in series	Title	Directed by	Written by	Original release date	UK viewers (millions)
27	1	"Back to Bogmoor"	Dez McCarthy	Paul Rose	7 July 2015	0.188
28	2	"The Ghostel"	Dez McCarthy	Paul Rose	14 July 2015	0.159
29	3	"The Dead Headz"	Beryl Richards	Paul Rose	21 July 2015	Under 0.153
30	4	"That Sinking Feeling"	Dez McCarthy	Emma Ko	28 July 2015	Under 0.154
31	5	"Truth or Scare"	Diarmuid Goggins	Bronagh Taggart	4 August 2015	Under 0.180
32	6	"Ghost Swappers"	Diarmuid Goggins	Paul Rose	11 August 2015	Under 0.187
33	7	"An Inspector Calls"	Diarmuid Goggins	Mark Evans	18 August 2015	Under 0.168
34	8	"Groundbog Day"	Diarmuid Goggins	Bronagh Taggart	25 August 2015	Under 0.192
35	9	"Midsummer Night's Nightmare"	Beryl Richards	Mark Evans	1 September 2015	0.220
36	10	"Stupid Cupid"	Dez McCarthy	Naomi Smith & Jessica Silcock	8 September 2015	0.205
37	11	"Choc Horror"	Beryl Richards	Paul Rose	15 September 2015	0.294
38	12	"Ghostwriter"	Beryl Richards	Bronagh Taggart	22 September 2015	Under 0.181
39	13	"It's A Wonderful Afterlife"	Beryl Richards	Paul Rose	15 December 2015	Under 0.252
