= Kerri Quinn =

Northern Irish actress and singer

- Born: Belfast
- Education: Queen's University Belfast
- Occupations: Actress, singer
- Years active: 2006–present
- Children: 1

Kerri Quinn is an actress and singer from Northern Ireland. On television, she is known for her roles in Coronation Street and Hope Street.

== Early life and education ==
At the age of 13, Kerri Quinn started singing in bands. That gave her a boost in confidence, which prompted her to take on acting lessons.

Quinn followed theatre studies at the Belfast Institute of Further and Higher Education (BIFHE) and went on to graduate with a Bachelor of Arts honours degree at Queen's University Belfast in 2004. She didn't go on with the studies, bored with writing essays, but instead chose to learn the art hands on, in the theatre.

== Career ==
=== Live performance ===
Quinn performed in bands, as an in-house singer, and toured pubs and clubs with an ABBA tribute band. She also played in musicals such West Side Story (2006) and Dancing Shoes (The George Best Story, 2010), the rock-and-play Huzzies (2012) and The Threepenny Opera (2018).

=== Radio and podcasts ===
At the end of 2023 Quinn made her first appearance as a radio narrator. It was in the BBC miniseries The Mystery of Mount Stewart, about a boat that sank on Strangford Lough in April 1895. Theresa, Lady Londonderry had lend her sailing boat to her senior servants, as a treat. The series tries to uncover what happened to the boat and its eight passengers that went missing.

In 2024 Quinn starred in the RTÉ comical radio drama Helen Wheels by Fion Foley. Helen is the mother of a bicycle courier, working for a food delivery company, at the height of the COVID-19 pandemic in Belfast. When she finds drugs in her son's delivery bag, she decides to step in and go on a ride herself. The programme won the 2024 IMRO Radio Award in the category Speech Drama.

== Personal life ==
In the 2010s Quinn had bought a bungalow in north Belfast, at walking distance from her parents. Union flags were raised in the local area, likely as a form of intimidation. A flag near her home was taken down by a sectarian element who further took out their frustration on Quinn by smashing her windows. After the attack, she and her daughter moved in with her parents. When she asked for help, estate agents and politicians told her to simply sell the place. She left the house boarded up for a while.

== Filmography ==
=== Film ===
Year	Title	Role	Notes	Ref.
2014	Fishbowl	Tina	short by Martin McCann	
2016	Unhappy Endings	The Derby Woman	short thriller	
2018	The Good Christian Women's Writing Group	Jackie	short	
2020	Caroline	Caroline	short	
2023	The Bully	Gloria	short	
2023	Faith of Our Fathers	Ann	drama	
2024	Kneecap	Spin instructor	dark comedy	cameo

=== Television ===
Year	Title	Role	Episodes	Notes	Ref.
2011	Sketchy with Diarmuid Corr	various roles	1/9 (S2E2)		
2011	Brendan Smyth: Betrayal of Trust	Dervla	TV movie	BBC	
2015	The Frankenstein Chronicles	Mrs. Bowyer	1/12 (S1E2)	ITV	
2018	Come Home	Brenna Coyle	3/3	BBC One, RTÉ One	
2018	Care	Hilary	TV movie		
2018	Torvill & Dean (film)	Mrs Murray / Woman in garden	TV movie	ITV	
2018–2019	Coronation Street	Vicky Jefferies	60/...	ITV	
2019	Derry Girls	Rita	1/19 (S2E3)	Channel 4	
2021–present	Hope Street	Sergeant Marlene Pettigrew	35/36	BBC	
2021	Three Families	Louise Byrne	2/2	BBC One	
2022	The Witcher: Blood Origin	Aevenien	2/4	Netflix	
2023	Der Irland-Krimi	Saoirse Flynn	S4E2	German production	
2024	Dead and Buried	Sally Bowman	4/4	BBC NI, Virgin Media Television	
2024	Say Nothing	Chrissie	...	FX (USA) Disney+ (UK IE)	

=== Theatre ===
Year	Title	Role	Theatre	Location	Ref.
2006	West Side Story	Anita	Gaiety Theatre	Dublin	
2009	Three Women	Woman Two			
2009	The Weein	Susie Ego	Old Museum Arts Centre; Down Arts Centre	Belfast; Downpatrick	
2010; 2015	Dancing Shoes - The George Best Story (musical)	Angie Best; Mrs Fullaway	on tour Grand Opera House	UK Tour; Belfast	
2012	Huzzies	Dee	Tinderbox Theatre Company	The MAC Belfast	
2014	Cabaret (musical)	Sally Bowles	Metropolitan Arts Centre	Belfast	
2016; 2017	Educating Rita	Susan (Rita) White	Lyric Theatre	Belfast; All Ireland Tour	
2017	The Weir	Valerie	Lyric Theatre	Belfast	
2018	The Threepenny Opera	Jenny Diver	Lyric Theatre	Belfast, 13 performances	
2023	Burnt Out	Cheryl	Lyric Theatre	Belfast	

"Other theatrical roles include The Nativity... What The Donkey Saw, Smiley and Here Comes The Night (Lyric Theatre), What We're Made Of (Tinderbox)," "Lisa/Tracey in the all-female production of Flesh and Blood Women (GreenShoot Productions), Mother/Princess in Nivellis War (Cahoots NI), Roberta in Belfast by Moonlight (Kabosh), Beauty Queen in Hatch (P.J O'Reily/The Mac), Patsy in Baby its Cold Outside (Greenshoot Productions) Ma in Weddins Weeins and Wakes (Lyric Theatre), Emily in Titanic Boys (GBL Productions)."

=== Radio ===
Year	Title	Role	Channel	Notes	Ref.
2023-24	The Mystery of Mountstewart	Narrator	BBC Radio Ulster; BBC Radio Foyle	documentary in 3 episodes	
2024	Helen Wheels	Narrator/Main	RTÉ	comedy drama	
