= James (2008 film) =

- Directed by: Connor Clements
- Written by: Connor Clements
- Produced by: Connor Clements
- Starring: Niall Wright; Matt Jennings; Margaret Goodman; Gerry Doherty; Louis Rolston
- Cinematography: Declan Keeney
- Edited by: Kevin McDonald
- Music by: Kasia Middleton
- Release date: 1 April 2008 (Belfast Film Festival)
- Running time: 17 minutes
- Country: Northern Ireland
- Language: English

James is a 2008 Northern Irish coming-of-age short film. The film stars Niall Wright as James, a teenage boy attempting to come to terms with his burgeoning homosexuality.

== Plot summary ==
James (Niall Wright) is a withdrawn and secretive teenager, coming from a family with long-buried secrets. With no friends and a refusal to confide in his parents (Margaret Goodman and Gerry Doherty), he faces an inner battle as he comes to terms with his sexuality. His literature teacher, Mr. Sutherland (Matt Jennings), is his sole beacon of hope, believing that he may understand the trouble he faces. However, in his moment of need, Sutherland, concerned by the risks involved, fails to provide James with the support he needs. Devoid of hope, he makes an audacious decision to turn to seemingly the last person who can help, an old man (Louis Rolston) who he meets in the public toilets.

== Reception ==
The film won Best Northern Irish Short at the Belfast Film Festival, the Iris Prize for Best UK Short, and Best International Short at the St. Louis International Film Festival in 2008. In January, it beat 6,000 other entries to be one of 22 short films that was selected for the International Dramatic Competition at Sundance Film Festival. It was also part of the Sundance iTunes 10/10.

== Awards ==
- April 2008 Best Northern Irish Film, Belfast Film Festival 2008
- August 2008 Best Short Gaze Dublin International Lesbian & Gay Film Festival 2008
- August 2008 Jury Award Best Student Short Palm Springs Shortfest 2008
- October 2008 Iris Prize Festival Best UK Short 2008
- October 2008 Outlook Award Best LGBT Short Film 53rd Corona Cork Film Festival
- October 2008 Fort Lauderdale International Film Festival Award of Merit
- November 2008 Best International Short 17th Annual Saint Louis International Film Festival
- April 2009 Bronze Palm Award, Mexico International Film Festival
- May 2009 Best Foreign Film, NYC Downtown Short Film Festival
