= Hope Street (TV series) =

Irish television series

- Genre: Crime drama
- Created by: Paul Marquess; Susanne Farrell
- Starring: Amara Karan; Stephen Hagan; Karen Hassan; Marcus Onilude; Tara Lynne O'Neill; Ciarán McMenamin; Kerri Quinn; Niall Wright; Bríd Brennan; Des McAleer; Aaron McCusker; Niamh McGrady; Finnian Garbutt; Cameron Cuffe; Jenn Murray
- Music by: Justine Barker; Anthony Eve
- Country of origin: United Kingdom (Northern Ireland)
- Original language: English
- No. of series: 5
- No. of episodes: 51

Production
- Executive producers: Paul Marquess; Donna Wiffen
- Production locations: Donaghadee, Northern Ireland
- Cinematography: Nick Manley
- Editor: Peter Williams
- Running time: 43-56 Minutes
- Production companies: Long Story TV; Britbox North America

Original release
- Network: BBC One Northern Ireland; BBC One
- Release: 24 November 2021 – present

Hope Street is a Northern Irish crime serial drama television series filmed in Donaghadee, Northern Ireland. The series, broadcast on BBC One Northern Ireland, was created by Paul Marquess and Susanne Farrell and is based on life in the fictional 'Northern Ireland Police'. The series is also broadcast on BBC One once the episodes have been shown in the Northern Ireland region; as of the third series, full series have been released on BBC iPlayer ahead of broadcast.

== Premise ==
Throughout the series each episode features a crime story, interwoven with the lives and loves of the officers who police the coastal town.

The first series sees the sudden arrival of DC Leila Hussain (Amara Karan) in the fictional Northern Irish town of Port Devine. The local residents question the reason behind her arrival; only Inspector Finn O'Hare knows why Leila has been transferred but he is keeping it to himself. On Leila's arrival in the town, Karan hinted: "The secret, the reason why she's been brought to Northern Ireland, is actually a matter of life and death." Each episode follows a self-contained crime story following the investigation of the local police department as well as the exploits of the town's residents.

In the second series a former colleague of Finn's, DC Al Quinn, is sent to the town as part of an undercover operation. Following the conclusion of the operation Al stays in town to fill the void left following Leila's departure. When his daughter is caught up in the theft of an ATM, Al crosses the line to protect the one he loves most, putting his career on the line in the process.

In the third series a new detective constable, Jo Lipton (Karen Hassan), arrives in Port Devine alongside new police constable Ryan Power (Finnian Garbutt).

In the fourth series a new inspector, Eve Dunlop (Tara Lynne O'Neill), arrives in Port Devine following the departure of Inspector Finn O'Hare (Ciaran McMenamin) at the end of the previous series, alongside her husband, new detective constable Luke Jackson (Marcus Onilude).

In the fifth series a new police constable, Donal Gallagher (Cameron Cuffe), arrives following the departure of Callum McCarthy (Niall Wright) at the end of the previous series.

== Production ==
=== Creation ===
Hope Street was created by Paul Marquess and Susanne Farrell. Marquess stated that his aim whilst creating the series was to make a long-running local drama. Born in Belfast, Marquess said he wanted to avoid the stereotypes that come with Northern Irish media portrayals, instead focusing on the "humour and warmth" of the area. The series was commissioned in March 2021 by BBC Daytime and BritBox North America in a joint collaboration, with Marquess' and Farrell's production company, Long Story TV, co-producing the series with BritBox North America.

=== Development ===
It was important for Marquess and Farrell that the series not focus on the Troubles but instead, on the resilience of Northern Ireland. Another of Marquess' aims was to increase the number of television productions in Northern Ireland since he was hoping to return to the area after having left as a young person. He and Farrell created a cast and crew almost entirely formed of local talent from in and around Donaghadee, where the series is filmed. The 10-episode first series was funded by Northern Ireland Screen and it was confirmed that it would premiere on BBC One Northern Ireland in November 2021 as well as having a January 2022 broadcast on BBC One in the other regions of the United Kingdom.

The show stars an ensemble cast almost entirely collected from the local area, including Ciarán McMenamin, Kerri Quinn, Niall Wright, Des McAleer, Bríd Brennan, Aaron McCusker and Niamh McGrady.

McMenamin was helped with his research about the police by two schoolfriends who are part of the Police Service of Northern Ireland (PSNI). After reading the scripts for the series he was excited to be part of Hope Street owing to its modern-day portrayal of his community. He said that his experiences on set were the happiest moments of his professional life, owing to the locations they filmed in and the cast and crew. McMenamin explained: "The craic is a different level. When you live away, to come home and be surrounded by people just as sarcastic as you, makes getting out of bed in the morning a joy". Quinn opined that it was refreshing for Hope Street not to mention the Troubles and appreciated that the scripts focused on relationships and the small community of Port Devine. Wright echoed her comments, feeling that the serial drama was "a completely different take" from other dramas on television at the time of transmission. He added that the series would have plenty of twists and cliffhangers and hoped that it would be renewed for several further series. English cast member Karan said that whilst filming for the series the locals of Donaghadee were very proud of their town but "went out of their way to make [her] feel welcome". She added that she loved playing Leila even though she "sticks out in her new environment like a sore thumb".

In April 2022 the show was renewed for a second series, which premiered in November 2022, with Stephen Hagan taking on the role of new lead character, DC Al Quinn.

In April 2023 the show was renewed for a third series, which premiered in October 2023, with Karen Hassan taking on the role of new lead character DC Jo Lipton.

In April 2024 it was confirmed that the BBC had renewed Hope Street for a fourth series and would commence filming that month, with eight episodes being commissioned.

In June 2025 it was confirmed that the BBC had renewed Hope Street for a fifth series and would commence filming that month. The fifth series will contain the show's 50th episode.

=== Filming ===
Hope Street is filmed in Donaghadee, Northern Ireland, which acts as the fictional Port Devine. Locations within Donaghadee used as part of filming include Pier 36, a local restaurant that acted as The Commodore Pub, and a building on Shore Street used as Port Devine Police Station.

== Cast and characters ==
Character	Actor	Series				
Character	Actor	Series 1 (2021–22)	Series 2 (2022–23)	Series 3 (2023–24)	Series 4 (2024)	Series 5 (2025)
Inspector Finn O'Hare	Ciarán McMenamin	Main	Main	Main		
Inspector Eve Dunlop	Tara Lynne O'Neill				Main	Main
Sergeant Marlene Pettigrew	Kerri Quinn	Main	Main	Main	Main	Main
PC Callum McCarthy	Niall Wright	Main	Main	Main	Main	
PC Ryan Power	Finnian Garbutt			Main	Main	Main
PC Donal Gallagher	Cameron Cuffe					Main
DC Leila Hussain	Amara Karan	Main				
DC Al Quinn	Stephen Hagan		Main	Guest	Guest	
DC Jo Lipton	Karen Hassan			Main	Guest	
DC Luke Jackson	Marcus Onilude				Main	Main
Concepta O'Hare	Brid Brennan	Main	Main	Recurring	Recurring	
Barry Pettigrew	Des McAleer	Main	Main	Main	Main	
Clint Dunwoody	Aaron McCusker	Main	Main	Main	Main	Main
Nicole Devine	Niamh McGrady	Main	Main	Main	Main	Main
Siobhan O'Hare	Rachel Tucker	Main	Main	Main	Recurring	
Niamh O'Hare	Ellie Lavery	Main	Main	Main		
Shay O'Hare	Louis McCartney	Main	Main	Main		
Taylor Quinn	Sade Malone		Main	Main		
Assumpta Kozloswka	Carrie Crowley			Recurring	Recurring	
Aidan Hunter	Ian Beattie			Recurring	Recurring	
Ash Hayes	Meghan Tyler		Recurring	Recurring		
Brandi McClure	Katie Shortt				Main	Main
Lois Dunlop	Eleanor Methven				Main	Main
Seamie McCarthy	Paddy Jenkins				Main	Main
Chloe Jackson	RhéAna Kamalu				Main	Main
Ross Dunlop	Jonny Grogan				Main	Main
Sasha Cookson	Jenn Murray					Main

== Series overview ==
Series	Episodes	Originally released	
Series	Episodes	First released	Last released
1	10	24 November 2021	2 February 2022
2	10	7 November 2022	30 January 2023
3	15	30 October 2023	12 February 2024
4	8	28 October 2024	16 December 2024
5	8	27 October 2025	15 December 2025

== Episodes ==
=== Series 1 (2021–2022) ===
No. overall	No. in series	Title	Directed by	Written by	BBC One Northern Ireland Broadcast	BBC One Daytime Broadcast
1	1	Episode 1	Sean Glynn	Susanne Farrell	24 November 2021	31 January 2022
2	2	Episode 2	Sean Glynn	Jessica Lea	1 December 2021	1 February 2022
3	3	Episode 3	Dez McCarthy	Christine Murphy	8 December 2021	2 February 2022
4	4	Episode 4	Sean Glynn	Stuart Drennan	15 December 2021	3 February 2022
5	5	Episode 5	Dez McCarthy	Jessica Lea	22 December 2021	4 February 2022
6	6	Episode 6	Dez McCarthy	Susanne Farrell	5 January 2022	7 February 2022
7	7	Episode 7	Bruce Webb	Paul Marquess	12 January 2022	8 February 2022
8	8	Episode 8	Dez McCarthy	Christine Murphy	19 January 2022	9 February 2022
9	9	Episode 9	Bruce Webb	Stuart Drennan	26 January 2022	10 February 2022
10	10	Episode 10	Dez McCarthy	Jessica Lea	2 February 2022	11 February 2022

=== Series 2 (2022–2023) ===
No. overall	No. in series	Title	Directed by	Written by	BBC One Northern Ireland Broadcast	BBC One Daytime Broadcast
11	1	Episode 1	Dez McCarthy	Jessica Lea	7 November 2022	17 March 2023
12	2	Episode 2	Dez McCarthy	Tess McGowan	14 November 2022	24 March 2023
13	3	Episode 3	Sean Glynn	Christine Murphy	21 November 2022	31 March 2023
14	4	Episode 4	Sean Glynn	Hamish Wright & Stuart Drennan	28 November 2022	7 April 2023
15	5	Episode 5	Enda Hughes	Stuart Drennan	7 December 2022	14 April 2023
16	6	Episode 6	Enda Hughes	Greer Ellison	2 January 2023	21 April 2023
17	7	Episode 7	Dez McCarthy	Christine Murphy	9 January 2023	28 April 2023
18	8	Episode 8	Dez McCarthy	Karis Kelly	16 January 2023	12 May 2023
19	9	Episode 9	Sean Glynn	Stuart Drennan & Paul Marquess	23 January 2023	19 May 2023
20	10	Episode 10	Dez McCarthy	Stuart Drennan	30 January 2023	26 May 2023

=== Series 3 (2023–2024) ===
No. overall	No. in series	Title	Directed by	Written by	BBC One Northern Ireland Broadcast	BBC One Daytime Broadcast
21	1	Episode 1	Sean Glynn	Jessica Lea	30 October 2023	15 March 2024
22	2	Episode 2	Sean Glynn	Tess McGowan	6 November 2023	22 March 2024
23	3	Episode 3	Sean Glynn	Christine Murphy	13 November 2023	29 March 2024
24	4	Episode 4	Enda Hughes	Brian McGilloway	20 November 2023	5 April 2024
25	5	Episode 5	Enda Hughes	Stuart Drennan	27 November 2023	12 April 2024
26	6	Episode 6	Sean Glynn	Karis Kelly	4 December 2023	19 April 2024
27	7	Episode 7	Emma Lindley	Marcus Fleming	11 December 2023	26 April 2024
28	8	Episode 8	Emma Lindley	Lessa Harker	18 December 2023	10 May 2024
29	9	Episode 9	Joe McStravick	Phil Multyne	1 January 2024	17 May 2024
30	10	Episode 10	Amy Coop	Greer Ellison	8 January 2024	24 May 2024
31	11	Episode 11	Amy Coop	Jessica Lea	15 January 2024	31 May 2024
32	12	Episode 12	Enda Hughes	Amy Coop	22 January 2024	7 June 2024
33	13	Episode 13	Enda Hughes	Brian McGilloway	29 January 2024	14 June 2024
34	14	Episode 14	Suri Krishnamma	Paul Marquess	5 February 2024	20 June 2024
35	15	Episode 15	Suri Krishnamma	Sally Tatchell	12 February 2024	28 June 2024

=== Series 4 (2024) ===
No. overall	No. in series	Title	Directed by	Written by	BBC One Northern Ireland Broadcast	BBC One Daytime Broadcast
36	1	Episode 1	Sean Glynn	Paul Marquess	28 October 2024	1 November 2024
37	2	Episode 2	Enda Hughes	Jessica Lea	4 November 2024	8 November 2024
38	3	Episode 3	Enda Hughes	Stuart Drennan	11 November 2024	15 November 2024
39	4	Episode 4	Sean Glynn	Greer Ellison	18 November 2024	22 November 2024
40	5	Episode 5	Vicki Kisner	Karis Kelly	25 November 2024	29 November 2024
41	6	Episode 6	Vicki Kisner	Paul Williams	2 December 2024	6 December 2024
42	7	Episode 7	Audrey Cooke	Brian McGilloway	9 December 2024	13 December 2024
43	8	Episode 8	Audrey Cooke	Paul Marquess	16 December 2024	20 December 2024

=== Series 5 (2025) ===
No. overall	No. in series	Title	Directed by	Written by	BBC One Northern Ireland Broadcast	BBC One Daytime Broadcast
44	1	Episode 1	Sean Glynn	Paul Marquess	27 October 2025	31 October 2025
45	2	Episode 2	Sean Glynn	Paul Marquess	3 November 2025	7 November 2025
46	3	Episode 3	John Carlin	Stuart Drennan	10 November 2025	14 November 2025
47	4	Episode 4	John Carlin	Brian McGilloway	17 November 2025	21 November 2025
48	5	Episode 5	Emma Lindley	Matthew McDevitt	24 November 2025	28 November 2025
49	6	Episode 6	Emma Lindley	Paul Marquess	1 December 2025	5 December 2025
50	7	Episode 7	Enda Hughes	Noel McCann	8 December 2025	12 December 2025
51	8	Episode 8	Enda Hughes	Paul Marquess	15 December 2025	12 December 2025

== Broadcast ==
Hope Street is initially broadcast on BBC One Northern Ireland, before being shown on BBC One on daytimes for the remainder of the United Kingdom. As of the fourth series, the broadcast is a week apart from Northern Ireland and the remainder of the UK. Since the third series, full series have been released ahead of broadcast on BBC iPlayer. It is available in the US and Canada on Britbox streaming platform.

== Reception ==
On the Northern Irish BBC iPlayer, Hope Street received 1.6 million streams on the first five episodes of series one. Stephen Patterson, writing for the Metro, gave the series four stars out of a possible five. He wrote that within minutes of the first episode, the community-driven aspect is established "incredibly well". Patterson noted that the core cast are talented, praising McGrady specifically for "stealing every scene she's in". He also praised the standalone stories in each episode, feeling that they raise important issues in ways that he did not expect. He opined that Marquess had succeeded in his aim of portraying Northern Ireland accurately. He added that, despite serial dramas such as Red Rock, The Bill and Holby City losing popularity, Hope Street "suggests that there is still something of an appetite for this kind of programming", also hoping for more series of the programme.

== Home media releases ==
Series 1 and Series 2 have been released by Dazzler Media.

Title	Episodes	DVD release date	Total discs
Hope Street: Series 1	10	4 April 2022	3
Hope Street: Series 2	10	10 March 2023	3
