= Eden Lake =

2008 film by James Watkins

- Theatrical release poster
- Directed by: James Watkins
- Written by: James Watkins
- Produced by: Christian Colson; Richard Holmes
- Starring: Kelly Reilly; Michael Fassbender; Jack O'Connell; James Gandhi; Thomas Turgoose; Bronson Webb; Shaun Dooley; Finn Atkins
- Cinematography: Christopher Ross
- Edited by: Jon Harris
- Music by: David Julyan
- Production companies: Rollercoaster Films; Aramid Entertainment Fund; Pathé Pictures International
- Distributed by: Optimum Releasing (United Kingdom); Pathé (International)
- Release dates: 12 August 2008 (Fantasy Filmfest); 12 September 2008 (United Kingdom)
- Running time: 91 minutes
- Countries: United Kingdom; Cayman Islands
- Language: English
- Budget: $2 million
- Box office: $3.9–4.3 million

Eden Lake is a 2008 horror thriller film written and directed by James Watkins in his directorial debut. The film stars Kelly Reilly, Michael Fassbender, Jack O'Connell, James Gandhi, Thomas Turgoose, Bronson Webb, Shaun Dooley, and Finn Atkins. Its plot follows a young couple spending a day at a remote lake, only to be confronted and hunted by a group of hostile youths. The film is a co-production between the United Kingdom and the Cayman Islands.

Eden Lake premiered at the Fantasy Filmfest on 12 August 2008 and was released in the United Kingdom by Optimum Releasing on 12 September 2008. It is among a group of roughly contemporaneous films that deal with concerns about "Broken Britain" and "hoodies". Some of the close up scenes were filmed at Frensham Small Pond.

== Plot ==
Jenny Greengrass and her boyfriend, Steve Taylor, set off for a weekend away at Eden Lake, a remote spot in the English countryside. On the journey there, Steve complains about youths' recent antisocial behaviour and criticises adult parenting. After making it into town, the couple notice strange behaviour from the residents. They sleep at a motel where they witness a mother aggressively slapping her son, and the next day drive into the forest to camp around Eden Lake. On their way they meet a boy in the woods called Adam.

Jenny and Steve's idyllic getaway is disrupted by a gang of rowdy teenagers, led by their psychopathic leader, Brett. The next morning, the couple discovers their food supplies have been infested with insects, leading them to suspect the youths. As they attempt to head back into town for more food, they also pop their car tire on a glass bottle placed by the teens. At a local restaurant, Steve describes the teens to a waitress, who defensively insists her children would never harass anyone. Steve later sneaks into a house he believes belongs to the teens, but escapes upon the return of Jon, a surly homeowner.

The couple returns to the lake and go swimming together. Upon returning to the beach the couple discovers their Jeep and belongings are missing at the lake. Attempting to return to town on foot, they avoid a collision with Brett, who has stolen the Jeep. Finding Brett and the rest of the gang in the woods after nightfall, Steve threatens them, only for the gang to start pulling out knives; in the scuffle, Brett's dog is stabbed, sending him into a rage. The couple tries to flee, but the gang causes them to crash the Jeep. With Steve trapped, Jenny flees as he is captured.

At daybreak, Jenny witnesses Steve being tied to a rock with barbed wire by the gang. Brett orders each of them to stab Steve so they will all be implicated. Paige, the only female gang member, records Steve's torture on her phone. Jenny manages to distract the gang so Steve can free himself, but she is unable to nurse his mortal wounds, forcing her to run for help.

Jenny runs into Adam, a young boy she and Steve previously met, who informs the gang of her location. They capture and tie Jenny, along with Steve's dead body, to a pile of wood. Brett forces Adam to burn the couple while Paige films it. Jenny escapes, angering Brett, who necklaces Adam in retaliation. Meanwhile, Jenny accidentally kills a younger reluctant youth, Cooper, who was attempting to help her. After finding Cooper's body, Brett furiously beats another gang member to death. Paige flees in fear. Jenny runs into the road, stopping a driver, only to realise he is Ricky's older brother. Jenny steals his van, speeding down the road, killing Paige by running her over. Returning to town, Jenny crashes into a backyard party.

Jenny later awakens inside the home and is comforted by a woman and Jon. The other parents are informed of the dead gang members, all of whom are the children of the adults at the house, making Jenny realise that she is in Brett's home. With nowhere to hide, Jenny locks herself in the bathroom for protection until Jon kicks the door down. Despite her pleas, Brett lies that she and Steve murdered his friends and his dog, causing Jon and two other men to attack Jenny violently. Returning to his room and blocking out the sound of Jenny's screams, Brett deletes the videos of his gang's crimes from Paige's phone and stares blankly into a mirror while wearing Steve's sunglasses.

== Cast ==
- Kelly Reilly as Jenny Greengrass
- Michael Fassbender as Steve Taylor
- Jack O'Connell as Brett
- James Gandhi as Adam
- Thomas Turgoose as Cooper
- Bronson Webb as Reece
- Shaun Dooley as Jon
- Finn Atkins as Paige
- Thomas Gill as Ricky
- James Burrows as Harry

== Release ==
Eden Lake premiered at the Fantasy Filmfest on 12 August 2008 and was released in the United Kingdom by Optimum Releasing on 12 September 2008.

== Reception ==
=== Critical response ===
On Rotten Tomatoes, a review aggregator, 76% of 33 surveyed critics gave the film a positive review; the average rating is 6.3/10. The site's critical consensus reads: "A brutal and effective British hoodie-horror that, despite the clichés, stays on the right side of scary." Metacritic assigned the film a weighted average score of 65 out of 100, based on 7 critics, indicating "generally favourable reviews ".

Dennis Harvey reviewed the film for Variety and said that it was "an effectively harrowing Brit thriller-cum-horror pic," comparing it to Lord of the Flies (1963) and Last House on the Left (1972). The Guardian's Peter Bradshaw drew parallels with Straw Dogs (1971), Deliverance (1972), and Blue Remembered Hills (1979), and stated that "this looks to me like the best British horror film in years: nasty, scary and tight as a drum," concluding that the film was "exceptionally well made, ruthlessly extreme, relentlessly upsetting."

Other critics, however, have savaged the film, denouncing it as an incitement to class prejudice against working class people in Britain. The Sun condemned the film's "nasty suggestion that all working-class people are thugs" while The Daily Telegraph concluded that "this ugly witless film expresses fear and loathing of ordinary English people". Owen Jones, in his 2011 book Chavs: The Demonization of the Working Class cites the film at length as an example of media demonisation of proletarian youth via the "Chav" stereotype. He comments, "Here was a film arguing that the middle classes could no longer live alongside the quasi-bestial lower orders."

Eden Lake has been associated with "hoodie horror," a cycle of horror films that explore concerns over "Broken Britain" and a fear of "hoodies," including The Great Ecstasy of Robert Carmichael (2005), Outlaw (2007), Summer Scars (2007), The Disappeared (2008), Heartless (2009), Harry Brown (2009) and Cherry Tree Lane (2010).

=== Accolades ===
Award	Date	Category	Subject	Result
Empire Awards (14th Awards)	29 March 2009	Best British Film	Eden Lake	Nominated
Empire Awards (14th Awards)	29 March 2009	Best Horror	Eden Lake	Won

== See also ==
- Cinema of the United Kingdom
- Mathil Mel Poonai, a 2013 Tamil language thriller that bears several similarities to Eden Lake.
