= Jessica Forrest =

British actress (born 1990)

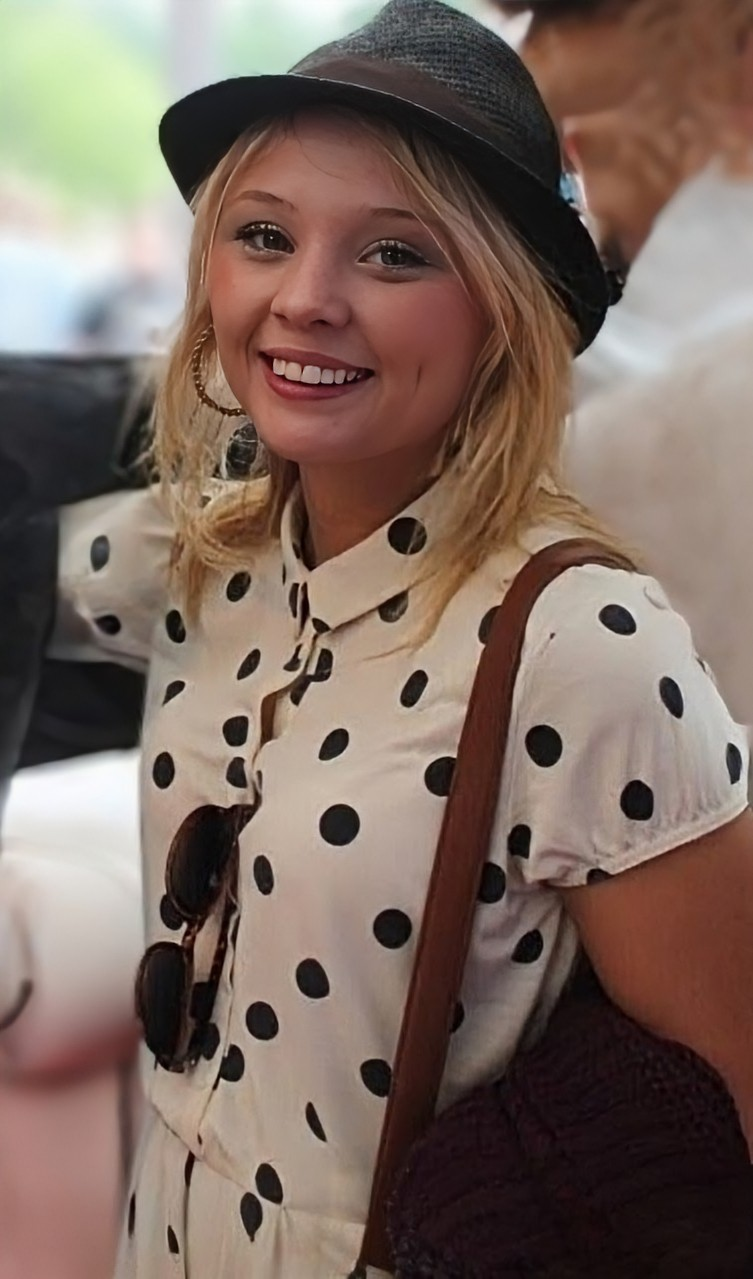
- Forrest in 2012
- Born: 1990 (age 36)
- Occupations: Actress; Writer
- Years active: 2010–
- Television: Hollyoaks; Dani's Castle

Jessica Forrest (born 1990) is a British actress and writer. Raised in Colne, Lancashire, Forrest studied drama at Manchester University, but found the course impractical and in 2010 left to play Leanne Holiday in the British soap opera Hollyoaks. Forrest remained in the role until 2013, when her character was killed-off. Following her departure, Forrest guest-starred in Playhouse Presents, Coronation Street and Dani's Castle, and she portrayed a main role in the third season of Dani's Castle. In 2016 and 2018, Forrest portrayed Jasmine in the theatre production Chip Shop Chips, and she co-wrote and performed in The Trolley Girls at the 2016 Edinburgh Fringe Festival. Forrest later moved to Italy and launched a project teaching children English through song and animation, and in 2022 she performed her autobiographical one-woman show The Olive Tree.

== Early life ==
Jessica Forrest was born in 1990 and was raised in Colne, Lancashire. Forrest enjoyed theatre from a young age, pursuing acting in school and joining her local dramatic society. Forrest attended Ss John Fisher and Thomas More Roman Catholic High School and later Nelson and Colne College. Forrest had wanted to act but felt that she had no proper experience. Forrest later studied drama and screen studies at University of Manchester, but did not like the course as she found it too academic and realised that she would rather perform.

== Career ==
=== Hollyoaks ===
In July 2010, it was announced that 19-year-old Forrest had joined the cast of the British soap opera Hollyoaks. Forrest's casting was announced alongside Sikander Malik as Jamil Fadel and PJ Brennan as Doug Carter. The three were the focus of the Hollyoaks online spin-off Hollyoaks: Freshers, which aired weeks before they began appearing in the main soap as regular characters. Forrest was grateful that she had filmed Hollyoaks: Freshers before the main show as it allowed her to understand her role and working on set. Forrest had won the role when she was talent scouted in the street and invited to audition; she then went to an open audition at the BBC and then was given a year long contract for Hollyoaks that same day, which led to her leaving her university course. She was chosen out of thousands of candidates. Hollyoaks: Freshers debuted on 26 August, with Forrest appearing in all six episodes. Forrest initially commuted from Manchester to work, but she later moved to Liverpool, where the soap is filmed. Forrest had watched Hollyoaks when she was younger, but was nervous upon taking up the role as she had not worked in television before.

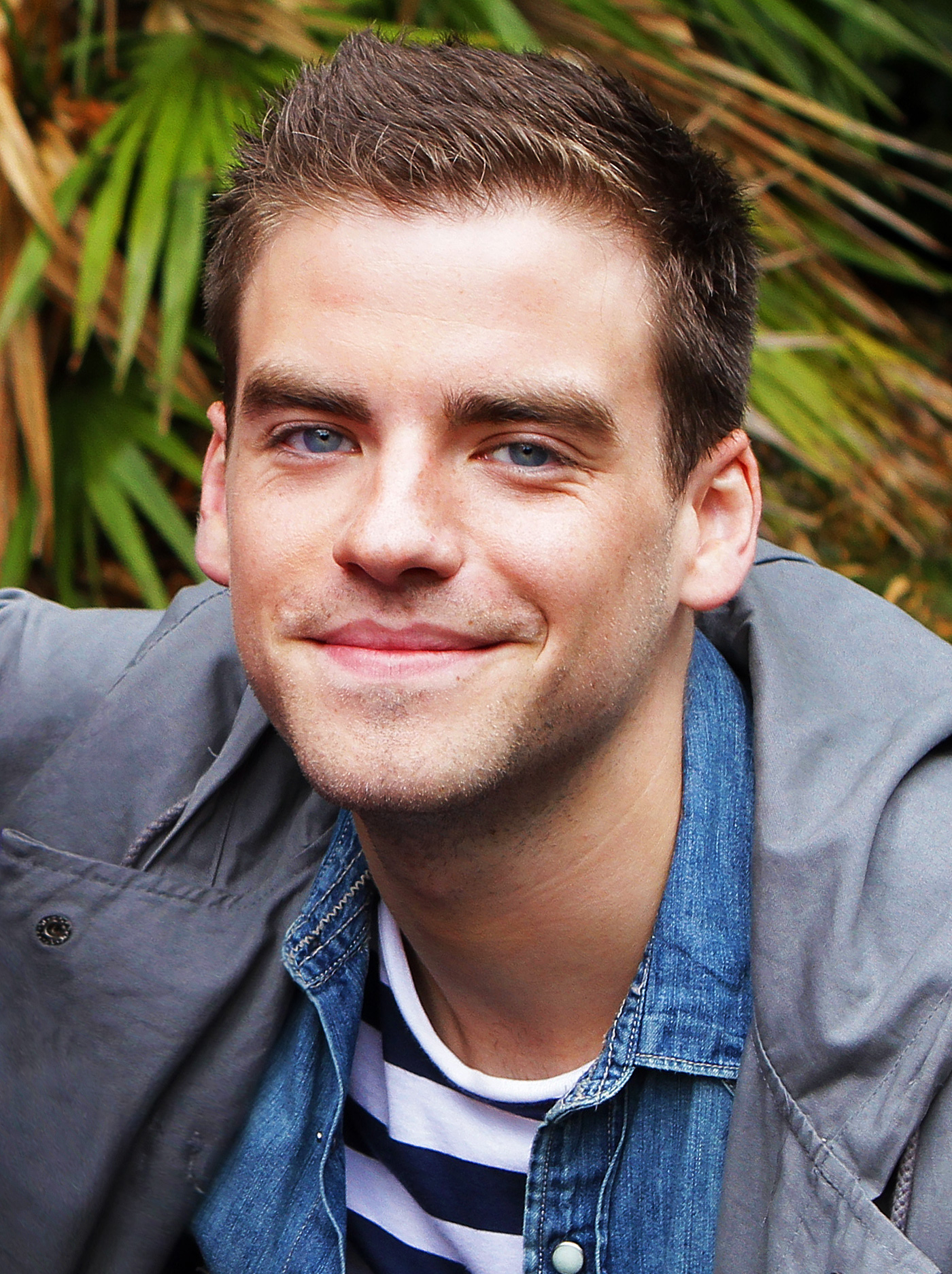
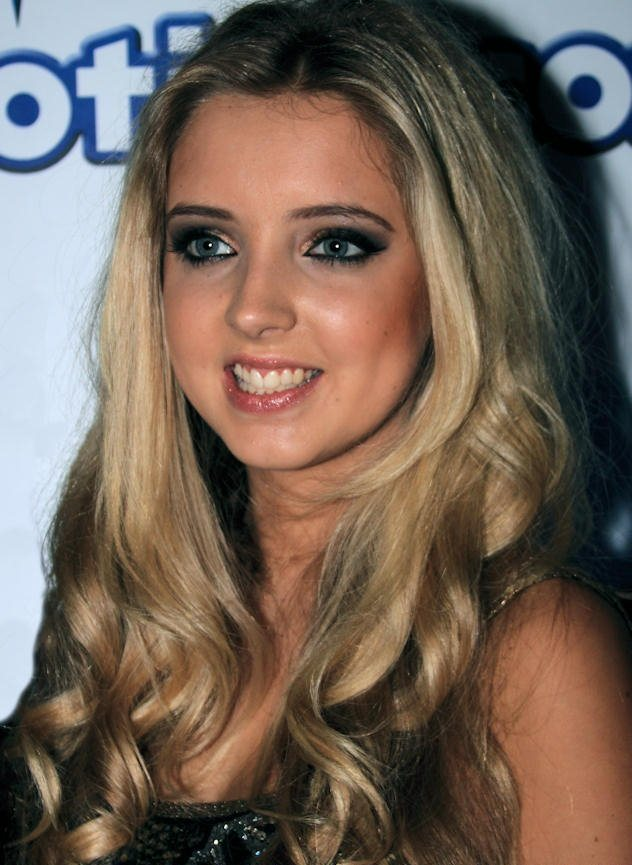
Whilst working on Hollyoaks, Forrest lived with several of her colleagues, including P.J. Brennan (left) and Alice Barlow (right).

Forrest received mixed reception regarding her character when she was recognised in public. Forrest later lived with her castmates Bianca Hendrickse-Spendlove, Alice Barlow and Brennan. After the exit of Leanne's main love interest, Forrest was worried that she would be written off the soap, but new producer Gareth Philips assured her that he loved the character. In 2018, Forrest reflected, "Looking back I realise how nervous I was. Being in Hollyoaks was like going to university for me. We went out twice a week and had a big house to share. It was just fun". She had earlier described the experience as less scary than attending university. Forrest also portrayed Leanne in the 2012 Hollyoaks spinoff Hollyoaks: Chasing Rainbows.

"I have done really well out of the Hollyoaks 18th birthday storyline. Obviously it means I can't come back... but every actress wants a good exit. I really enjoy the industry – anything from presenting, to interviewing, to filming. I have learnt so much since being on Hollyoaks."

— Forrest on her Hollyoaks exit (2013)

In October 2013, Leanne made her unannounced final appearance as Leanne when she was killed off during the soap's 18th anniversary celebrations. Forrest had filmed her exit scenes in August 2013 over 12-hour days, and had already filmed another project by the time her departure aired. As she left, Forrest told Digital Spy she felt satisfied with her experience as Leanne and was ready for change. Speaking highly on her time in Hollyoaks, Forrest said she had met some of her best friends in the role, and credited it with helping her mature and gain confidence on a television set and in life. A writer from Burnley Express wrote that Forrest's time on Hollyoaks "has seen her develop not just as an actress, but as a woman".

=== Since 2014 ===
Following her Hollyoaks departure, Forrest took part in several auditions and said that she wanted to do some comedy and children's television. Forrest had a small role as Charlotte in the 2014 one-off Sky Arts comedy drama The Cruise, part of Playhouse Presents. Forrest had filmed this project prior to the broadcast of her Hollyoaks exit. That year, Forrest also made a guest appearance as Siobhan Davies in an episode of rival soap opera Coronation Street. In 2015, Forrest portrayed leading character Clare in the third season of Dani's Castle (also known as Rich, Jimmy & Kait's Castle). Whilst filming Dani's Castle, Forrest stayed in a Holiday Inn hotel in Belfast for 10 weeks. Forrest has commented that she enjoys travelling for acting roles as she otherwise gets "itchy feet" if she stays in one place for too long.

After Dani's Castle, Forrest took part in various theatre productions, which she believed changed her as an actress. In 2016, Forrest portrayed teenager Jasmine in a five-week tour run of Chip Shop Chips, which was an immersive play where venues in England would be transformed into fish-and-chip shops for the performance. Chip Shop Chips was Forrest's theatre debut. In 2016, Forrest wrote and performed in The Trolley Girls at the 2016 Edinburgh Fringe Festival with Olivia Nicholson, who is also from Colne; Forrest commented that she "really enjoyed" the writing side of the production. Forrest added that she used her experiences as inspiration for "new material". In 2018, Forrest reprised her role in Chip Shop Chips when the production returned for a 10-week run touring around England; Forrest was happy to return as she wanted to develop her character further. In between acting jobs, Forrest worked as a nanny in London, where she had moved to prior to 2018, and she told the Lancashire Telegraph that she was developing a one-woman show based on her experiences in the job. Forrest also began to do stand-up comedy, which she enjoyed. In 2019, Forrest portrayed Bev in the pilot episode of Don't You Know Who I Am?

In roughly 2021, Forrest moved to Foligno, Italy. In 2022, Forrest returned to the Edinburgh Fringe Festival and performed her one-woman show called The Olive Tree, a memoir based on her experiences as an actress and nanny and her journey from Manchester to Italy. The show ran from 15–20 August and featured Forrest performing on stage underneath an olive tree branch. Vivien Devlin from Edinburgh Guide praised the 50-minute show, calling it "Nostalgic, lyrical, dreamlike" and "minimalist and magical journey through love and loss" that had "enchanting imagery".

Whilst living in Italy, Forrest launched a video project called "Little English", which encourages the learning of the English language through song and animation. Forrest used her background as an educator and an entertainer to develop the project and create a curriculum with academic and entertainment sides, and had realised that she enjoyed working in children's education entertainment while working on Dani's Castle. She worked with composer Filippo Ciccioli and illustrator Cath Appleton to develop the project, with other entertainers also contributing. Forrest wanted to ensure that the music in the project could also be enjoyed by adults in addition to children. In 2024, Forrest portrayed the role of Gilly in Brassic.

== Philanthropy ==
In 2013, Forrest and television presenter Will Best helped launch an anti-tobacco short-film competition. The competition asked young people in North West England to research and make a short film on tobacco marketing and smoking in their area.

== Acting credits ==
=== Filmography ===
Year	Title	Role	Notes	Ref.
2010	Hollyoaks: Freshers	Leanne Holiday	Online spin-off (6 episodes)	
2010–13	Hollyoaks	Leanne Holiday	Regular role	
2012	Hollyoaks: Chasing Rainbows	Leanne Holiday	Hollyoaks spinoff	
2014	Playhouse Presents	Charlotte	1 episode (The Cruise)	
2014	Coronation Street	Siobhan Davies	Guest role (1 episode)	
2015	Dani's Castle	Clare	Main role (Season 3)	
2019	Don't You Know Who I Am?	Bev	Pilot episode	
2024	Brassic	Gilly	Guest appearance	

=== Theatre ===
Year	Production	Venue	Role	Notes
2016, 2018	Chip Shop Chips	Various	Jasmine	—N/a
2016	The Trolley Girls	Edinburgh Fringe Festival	—N/a	Also co-writer
2022	The Olive Tree	Edinburgh Fringe Festival	Herself	Also writer and director
