= James Gandhi =

British actor and writer

- Occupation: Actor
- Years active: 2004—present
- Known for: Dani's House

James Gandhi is an English actor, producer and writer. He is best known for his role playing Ben in the BBC children's sitcom Dani's House between 2008 and 2012. He first appeared in My Life as a Popat at the age of 10. He subsequently co-starred in the horror film Eden Lake and appeared in 2 episodes of House of Anubis.

As of 2021, he's an executive producer for Mammoth Screen, which developed Noughts + Crosses and Three Families for the BBC.

== Filmography ==
Year	TV Show/Film	Role	Notes
2004–2007	My Life as a Popat	Chetan	14 episodes
2008	Eden Lake	Adam	
2008–2012	Dani's House	Ben	65 episodes
2011	House of Anubis	Robbie	2 episodes
2013	Dani's Castle	Ben	1 episode (21st Century Boy)
