= Dani's House =

British children's television series

- Created by: Paul Rose; Gary Parker; Emma Ko
- Starring: Dani Harmer; Harry Culverhouse; James Gandhi; Darragh Mortell; Steff White; Millie Innes; Sebastian Applewhite; Klariza Clayton; Lewis Rainer; Daniel Roche; James Mackenzie; Luke Walles
- Opening theme: "Free" by Dani Harmer
- Country of origin: United Kingdom
- Original language: English
- No. of series: 5
- No. of episodes: 65 (list of episodes)

Production
- Producers: Paul McKenzie; Jemma Rodgers; Lucy Robinson; Jo Willett
- Running time: 30 minutes
- Production company: The Foundation

Original release
- Network: CBBC
- Release: 26 September 2008 – 19 July 2012

Related
- Dani's Castle (2013–2015)

Dani's House is a British children's comedy series broadcast on CBBC and starring Dani Harmer. The first series premiered on 26 September 2008, and its fifth series concluded on 19 July 2012. It has received several awards and nominations from BAFTA Kids. A spin-off called Dani's Castle aired from 2013 to 2015.

== Plot ==
Dani is a teenage actress and singer who is regularly left in charge of her younger brother Max, his friend Ben, and their youngest baby sibling, "the baby from hell" who is only shown in a cot. She and her friends Toby and Sam spend most of their time at her house in a den hangout. As they go about their lives, they encounter some bizarre situations. Meanwhile, two aliens known as Coordinators (Coordinator Zang and Coordinator Zark) observe their actions. In series 2, Dani's family has moved to a new house. Toby has gone to medical school, and Dani becomes friends with Jack. The "baby from hell" is no longer referenced but is replaced by a "cat from hell", who also disappears in series 3 and who is also Jack's nemesis.

In series 4, Dani gets a part in the medical drama/soap opera McHurties Hospital. Her friend Sam has been training to become an astronaut, and eventually leaves the cast to become a scientist and space-explorer for NASA. Ruby, Dani's enthusiastic personal trainer, joins the cast, as well as Maisy, her prank-pulling younger sister, the latter of whom becomes a foil for Max.

In series 5, Dani continues her career as an actress, while Jack works as a DJ, and Ruby continues as a personal trainer. Max pursues a career as a grime artist, and goes on a world tour. Their cousin Megaboyd teams up with Maisy and plays pranks on Dani and her friends. Ben tries to find some new hobbies. The show ended after 5 series, making it one of the most successful CBBC shows of all time.

== Episodes ==
Series	Episodes	Originally released	
Series	Episodes	First released	Last released
1	13	26 September 2008	19 December 2008
2	13	30 November 2009	19 March 2010
3	13	10 September 2010	3 December 2010
4	13	16 September 2011	9 December 2011
5	13	29 April 2012	19 July 2012

== Characters ==
=== Overview ===
Legend
= Main cast
= Recurring cast
= Guest cast

List of Dani's House characters and cast
Character	Portrayed by	Series				
Character	Portrayed by	1	2	3	4	5
Dani	Dani Harmer	Main	Main	Main	Main	Main
Co-ordinator Zark	Dani Harmer	Main	Main	Main	Main	Main
Toby	Harry Culverhouse	Main	Guest			Guest
Co-ordinator Zang	Harry Culverhouse	Main	Main	Main	Main	Main
Sam	Klariza Clayton	Main	Main	Main	Main	Guest
Max	Sebastian Applewhite	Main	Main	Main	Main	Guest (Note: Sebastian Applewhite is credited as a main character in the fifth series despite only appearing in the final episode of the series.)
Ben	James Gandhi	Main	Main	Main	Main	Main
Jack	Darragh Mortell		Main	Main	Main	Main
Ruby	Steff White				Main (Note: Ruby and Maisy first appear in "The Big Grapple" and become star characters starting with "Pen Pal", after Sam leaves the show.)	Main
Maisy	Millie Innes				Main	Main
Zarina Wix	Gaynor Faye				Recurring	Recurring
Megaboyd	Daniel Roche					Recurring
Alex	Lewis Rainer					Recurring

=== Main ===
- Dani (Dani Harmer): Dani is a teenaged (Note: At the start of the series, Dani is 17 years old, and her brother Max is 12. At the end of series 5 she is 21 years old.) actress and singer who is usually homebound in order to look after her younger brother Max and their infant brother. (Note: In series 1, Dani's baby brother is never directly shown. Dani's parents also do not visibly appear in the show.) She hangs out with her friends at the house, and undergoes various adventures. She feuds regularly with Max, who is always trying to annoy and to embarrass her. In series 4, she takes an acting gig as Nurse Emily Woodmagnet in the TV drama McHurties Hospital.
- Toby (Harry Culverhouse): Toby is Dani's friend. He is obsessed with his hair and regularly spikes it up with gel. In series 1, he takes a large number of jobs ranging from a waiter to a pet-sitter. He gets along with Max's friend Ben. In series 2, he leaves for medical school, but makes a guest appearance in the series 2 Christmas special "Scrooge Tube". He shares a secret handshake with Jack, and also appears in the series 5 finale at Dani's party.
- Sam (Klariza Clayton): Sam is Dani's best friend. Her interests are in science and she spends much of her time at the village library. Her idol is Professor Brian Cox, and she cannot stand anyone that criticises him. She likes everything to be neat and tidy. In series 4, she plans to train as an astronaut for NASA and leaves the show mid-season, returning for the series 5 finale.
- Max (Sebastian Applewhite): Max is Dani's younger brother. He aspires to rule the world and annoy his sister along the way. His lifetime ambition is to become a millionaire with his friend Ben. In series 5, he becomes a grime star and goes on a world tour, where he does not reappear until the series finale at Dani's party.
- Ben (James Gandhi): Ben is Max's "none-too-bright" best friend who spends a lot of time at Dani's house. He thinks up many of the devious schemes that he and Max get involved, although Max always claims credit for them. Max often treats Ben badly, although there was one episode where Ben's pet axolotl dies, and Max prepares a funeral for it. In some of the series 4 episodes where Max is not around, he initiates his own schemes. He is absent once in series 3.
- Jack (Darragh Mortell): Jack joins the cast as Dani's close friend at the beginning of series 2. He enjoys eating junk food, especially doughnuts. As a DJ, Jack regularly plays at different gigs, kid parties, and occasional competitions. At one point, he participates in the same TV drama as Dani, much to her annoyance. He has a history with his nemesis, 'The Cat From Hell' who appears in some of the episodes of Series 2, and is mentioned in the Series 5 episode 'Doggy Day Afternoon'
- Ruby (Steff White): Ruby is Dani's energetic personal trainer. She becomes good friends with Dani and regularly visits the house.
- Maisy (Millie Innes): Maisy is Ruby's younger sister. She is mischievous and shares a fierce rivalry with Max.

=== Supporting ===
- The Baby from Hell (series 1): The Baby From Hell, is Max and Dani's younger sibling and only appeared in Series 1. It is known for its explosive diaper attack. In Series 2, the Baby is at nursery according to Dani.
- Coordinators Zang and Zark (Harry Culverhouse and Dani Harmer): These two are green aliens who are travelling together across the universe. They are supposedly on a secret mission to discover more about the human race, but in fact this is just an excuse to sit about and watch "Dani's House". They are heavily influenced by the programme, and often attempt to copy what they see, with comic results.
- The Cat from Hell (series 2): The Cat From Hell, is first seen in the episode 'Jack in the House, and some of the episodes in Series 2. It is best known as Jack's nemesis and is seen entering and leaving Dani's House through an Animal Flip. The Cat vanishes in Series 3, and is not mentioned in Series 4. In Series 5, he is mentioned by Jack in the episode Doggy Day Afternoon.
- Zarina Wix (Gaynor Faye) (series 4–5): is the producer of McHurties Hospital, and Dani's employer.
- Megaboyd (Daniel Roche) (series 5): is Dani's "self-reinvented cousin". He often conspires with Maisy on various schemes.
- Alex (Lewis Rainer) (series 5): Dani's boyfriend and colleague on McHurties Hospital.

== Production ==
In early 2008, the BBC announced a new 13-episode children's sitcom that stars Dani Harmer from The Story of Tracy Beaker series. The first series was filmed in June and July 2008 entirely in Kent at a secret location near Maidstone. The series began airing on 26 September on CBBC. The popularity of the show resulted in the ordering of a second series, which was filmed in Edinburgh during the early summer of 2009, and was broadcast that autumn. A third series was filmed in the summer of 2010 and aired from September to December of that year. Series 4 followed in 2011 with a similar broadcast schedule as the third series. The fifth and final series was filmed from November 2011 to February 2012 and aired from 26 April to 19 July.

== Awards and nominations ==
Dani's House has received multiple nominations from Children's BAFTA Awards .

Ceremony	Award	Nominee	Result	Place
2008 Children's BAFTA Awards	BAFTA Kids' Vote Television	Dani's House	Won	1
2009 Children's BAFTA Awards	Children's Comedy	Dani's House	Won	1
2010 Children's BAFTA Awards	Children's Comedy	Dani's House	Nominated	3
2011 Children's BAFTA Awards	Children's Comedy	Dani's House	Nominated	5
2011 Children's BAFTA Awards	Children's Performer	Dani Harmer	Nominated	N/A
2012 Children's BAFTA Awards	BAFTA Kids' Vote Television	Dani's House	Nominated	2
2012 Children's BAFTA Awards	Children's TV Programme	Dani's House	Nominated	4
2012 Children's BAFTA Awards	Best Children's Comedy	Dani's House	Won	1

== Spin-off ==
In July 2012, the CBBC commissioned Zodiak Kids to produce a new TV comedy series starring Harmer. In the spin-off, Dani inherits an old castle in Northern Ireland from her deceased Aunt Marjorie. The first series aired from 17 January 2013 to 18 April 2013, and the second series aired from 14 November 2013 to 3 January 2014. The third and final series aired from 7 July 2015 to 15 December 2015.
