= Niall Wright =

Irish actor

- Born: 26 July 1991 (age 35); Belfast, Northern Ireland
- Education: Bristol Old Vic Theatre School
- Occupation: Actor
- Years active: 2004–present

Niall Wright is a Northern Irish actor.

== Early life and career ==
Wright trained as a child at the Gwyneth Murdock School of Drama and studied professionally at the Old Vic Theatre School in Bristol. He also did a business degree at University College Dublin.

In 2004 he played the role of Jonjo in the Northern Irish comedy-drama film Mickybo and Me.

In 2008 Wright played the lead role in the short film James, which won several international awards and was selected for both the Sundance Film Festival and Cannes Film Festival.

From 2012–13 Wright was a regular in the first two series of the television series Six Degrees, playing Danny Burns; he was a recurring character in the third series in 2015.

In 2013 he starred in the comedy-drama film Good Vibrations as Mickey Bradley.

From 2013 to 2015 he portrayed one of the main characters on the CBBC show Dani's Castle.

Wright made his stage debut at the Abbey Theatre, Dublin, in 2015 playing the role of Joseph Swane in By the Bog of Cats.

In April 2017 he originated the role of JJ Carney in Jez Butterworth's The Ferryman at the Royal Court Theatre ahead of a transfer to the Gielgud Theatre in the West End.

In October 2018 Wright made his Broadway debut reprising his role of JJ Carney in The Ferryman.

From 2021 to 2024 he played series regular PC Callum McCarthy in the BBC and BritBox Original TV series Hope Street.

== Filmography ==
=== Film ===
Year	Title	Role	Notes
2004	Mickybo and Me	Jonjo	
2005	Soldier	Child	Short film
2006	Middletown	Young Jim	
2008	James	James	
2013	Good Vibrations	Mickey Bradley	

=== Television ===
Year	Title	Role	Notes
2005	Kelly	Himself	
2012–2013, 2015	Six Degrees	Danny Burns	
2013–2015	Dani's Castle	Gabe / Carlos / Gerard	Also portrayed Carlos in series 3, and Gerard in series 3 episode 11
2018	Lore	Daft Jamie	Episode: "Burke and Hare: In The Name of Science"
2021–2024	Hope Street	PC Callum McCarthy	Main role
2026	A Woman of Substance	Mac	

=== Theatre ===
Year	Title	Role	Theatre	Location
2015	By the Bog of Cats	Joseph Swane	Abbey Theatre	Dublin
2017	The Ferryman	JJ Carney	Royal Court Theatre	London
2018	The Ferryman	JJ Carney	Bernard B. Jacobs Theatre	Broadway
2024	Grania	Diarmuid	Abbey Theatre	Dublin
