= Dani's Castle =

British children's comedy-drama television series

- Also known as: Rich, Jimmy & Kait's Castle (series 3)
- Genre: Children's comedy Sitcom
- Created by: Raymond Lau; Paul Rose; Dez McCarthy
- Written by: Various; lead writer Paul Rose
- Starring: Dani Harmer; Kieran Alleyne; Niall Wright; Shannon Flynn; Lorenzo Rodriguez; Jordan Brown; Richard Wisker; Toby Murray; Jessica Forrest; Lucy Hutchinson
- Opening theme: "Ferrari" (Wonder Villains)
- Country of origin: United Kingdom
- Original language: English
- No. of series: 3
- No. of episodes: 39 (list of episodes)

Production
- Executive producers: Elaine Sperber; Dani Harmer; Melissa Hardinge
- Producers: Raymond Lau; Paul McKenzie
- Production locations: Killyleagh Castle, Northern Ireland
- Running time: 30 minutes
- Production company: The Foundation

Original release
- Network: CBBC
- Release: 17 January 2013 – 15 December 2015

Related
- Dani's House (2008–2012)

Dani's Castle (also known as Rich, Jimmy & Kait's Castle during the third series (Note: The Series 3 title card originally shows Dani's Castle then "Dani's" disappears and changes to "Rich Jimmy & Kait's", but despite this the show is still known formally as Dani's Castle.)) is a British children's comedy series broadcast on the CBBC Channel. It is the spin-off series to Dani's House. Dani inherits a castle in Northern Ireland from her deceased aunt and gets more than she expected. She meets three residents, an unknown cousin, and two people who died 250 years ago. Series 1 began airing on 17 January 2013 on the CBBC Channel, and 1 April 2013 on ABC3. Series 2 of Dani's Castle aired from 14 November 2013 to 3 January 2014. Series 3 aired from 7 July 2015 to 22 September 2015, and then returned for a finale Christmas episode on 15 December 2015. It was filmed in County Down in Northern Ireland.

== Plot ==
=== Series 1 ===
Following the events of Dani's House, Dani's Castle sees Dani re-evaluating her whole life after McHurtie's Hospital, a fictional medical drama/soap opera, is cancelled. But her fortunes soon change when her Great-Aunt Marjorie dies and leaves Dani with her very own castle. With dreams of becoming the lady of the manor, Dani arrives at her new home full of ideas and optimism. But she's soon brought up short when she reaches Bogmoor Castle to find it's been voted the "No.1 Worst Tourist Attraction" in the country for 10 years running, with crumbling towers, howling corridors, and an overgrown jungle for a garden, even a resident pair of young 250-year-old ghosts – Gabe and Esme. And Dani isn't the only heir; she soon encounters a troublesome cousin she didn't even know she had, who seems to break anything and everything. Worst of all: Great-Aunt Marjorie has left her a large stack of debts and unpaid bills.

=== Series 2 ===
The new series picks up from series 1 and Dani has moved on. She's a Hollywood star now, but Bogmoor Castle is still her home and she cares about the people who live there. But since she can't be there in person, she can at least be a font of wisdom on the webcam. But Kait, Jimmy, Rich, Dylan, Esme, and Gabe still need her! Having left the castle in the hands of her cousins Rich and Jimmy, spectral ancestors Gabe and Esme, her best friend Kait, and Rich's little brother Dylan, there's still plenty for Dani to worry about. Also, there is a growing relationship between Kait and Rich. In this series, Rich is still coming up with money-making schemes for the castle – and sets up a brand new radio station, Bogmoor FM.

=== Series 3 ===
The show was renewed for a new series and renamed Rich, Jimmy & Kait's Castle following Dani Harmer's exit. In the series Kait sets up her own business (Kait's bakes), while Rich and Jimmy work on adding a recording studio to Bogmoor FM, Gabe sets up a Ghostel, Leonie invites The Dead Headz to play on Bogmoor FM, and Dylan meets a ghost from the Titanic. Rich and Kait split up, a prank war breaks out, Gabe and Rich counsel a nervous ghost, Gabe and Leonie switch places with Rich and Kait, Gabe gets a visit from a Ghostel inspector, Kait wins best newcomer at the pet snack business of year award, and it's Dylan's birthday. Rich and Kait feel awkward when they are made to play two people in love when acting out Midsummer Night's Dream, Jimmy returns home from his Street Dance Academy tour, and Jimmy and Clare go on a picnic date. Jimmy and Clare get together and Rich and Kait get back together. Gabe wants to write a gossip novel. The series introduced two new characters, Clare (Jessica Forrest) and Leonie (Lucy Hutchinson). The series aired from 7 July 2015 to 15 December 2015. This was the final series.

== Production ==
The show was filmed entirely on location at Killyleagh Castle in Killyleagh, County Down. The first, second and third series were filmed in the summers of 2012, 2013 and 2014, respectively. It was produced by Raymond Lau with the lead writer being Paul Rose and the lead director being Dez McCarthy.

== Cast ==
Cast list of Dani’s Castle
Actor	Character	Series		
Actor	Character	1	2	3
Dani Harmer	Dani	Main	Main	
Kieran Alleyne	Jimmy	Main	Main	Main
Niall Wright	Gabe	Main	Main	Main
Shannon Flynn	Kait	Main	Main	Main
Lorenzo Rodriguez	Leo	Main		
Jordan Brown	Esme	Main	Main	Recurring
Richard Wisker	Rich	Guest	Main	Main
Toby Murray	Dylan		Main	Main
Jessica Forrest	Clare			Main
Lucy Hutchinson	Leonie			Main

Series 1 Opening Titles Order: Dani Harmer, Kieran Alleyne, Niall Wright, Shannon Flynn, Lorenzo Rodriguez, Jordan Brown
Series 2 Opening Titles Order: Richard Wisker, Shannon Flynn, Niall Wright, Kieran Alleyne, Jordan Brown, Toby Murray, Dani Harmer
Series 3 Opening Titles Order: Richard Wisker, Shannon Flynn, Niall Wright, Kieran Alleyne, Toby Murray, Jessica Forrest, Lucy Hutchinson (Note: Jordan Brown was only credited in episode 2, Lucy Hutchinson was credited as from episode 3 onwards.)

== Episodes ==
Series	Episodes	Originally released	
Series	Episodes	First released	Last released
1	13	17 January 2013	18 April 2013
2	13	14 November 2013	31 October 2014
3	13	7 July 2015	15 December 2015

== Broadcasting ==
Country	Network(s)	Notes
United Kingdom	CBBC Channel	Series 1–3 have aired
Australia	ABC3	Series 1–3 have aired

== Reception ==
Series 1 performed well, with most episodes in the CBBC Weekly Top 10. "Dani Harmer is one of the most exciting and successful young actresses on television and this new project will really showcase her unique comedy talents and her growth as a performer," says executive producer Elaine Sperber. "Dani has a huge following on CBBC and this new series will be a major treat for her existing and new fans". Harry Venning of The Stage disliked the laugh track, saying "Laughter tracks are an abomination. Dani’s Castle is genuinely funny and the producers should trust their young audience to find it so, unaided and alone."

== CBBC Ratings ==
=== Series 1 ===
Episode no.	Airdate	Viewers (millions)	CBBC Weekly Ranking
1	17 January 2013	0.454	2
2	24 January 2013	0.450	3
3	31 January 2013	0.340	7
4	7 February 2013	0.390	5
5	14 February 2013	0.430	3
6	21 February 2013	0.210	—N/a
7	28 February 2013	0.260	—N/a
8	7 March 2013	0.440	1
9	21 March 2013	0.340	7
10	28 March 2013	0.290	3
11	4 April 2013	0.250	—N/a
12	11 April 2013	0.290	—N/a
13	18 April 2013	0.320	2

=== Series 2 ===
Episode no.	Airdate	Viewers (millions)	CBBC Weekly Ranking
1	14 November 2013	0.440	2
2	15 November 2013	0.360	—N/a
3	21 November 2013	0.380	4
4	22 November 2013	0.310	—N/a
5	28 November 2013	0.430	3
6	29 November 2013	0.360	—N/a
7	5 December 2013	0.290	9
8	6 December 2013	0.280	—N/a
9	12 December 2013	0.320	5
10	13 December 2013	0.270	10
11	18 December 2013	0.316	5
12	18 December 2013	0.364	2
13	3 October 2014	0.190	—N/a

=== Series 3 ===
Episode no.	Airdate	Viewers (millions)	CBBC Weekly Ranking
1	7 July 2015	0.188	3
2	14 July 2015	0.159	8
3	21 July 2015	Under 0.153	—N/a
4	28 July 2015	Under 0.154	—N/a
5	4 August 2015	Under 0.180	—N/a
6	11 August 2015	Under 0.187	—N/a
7	18 August 2015	Under 0.168	—N/a
8	25 August 2015	Under 0.192	—N/a
9	1 September 2015	0.220	7
10	8 September 2015	0.205	8
11	15 September 2015	0.294	3
12	22 September 2015	Under 0.181	—N/a
13	15 December 2015	Under 0.252	—N/a

== Notes ==
Series 2 and onwards does not contain an audience laughing track in the background.
