= Shannon Flynn =

British actress (born 1996)

- Born: Shannon May Flynn; 22 August 1996 (age 30); Rochdale, Greater Manchester, England
- Occupations: Actress and presenter
- Years active: 2008–2022
- Known for: Waterloo Road (2009–2012); Dani's Castle (2013–2015); Coronation Street (2016)

Shannon May Flynn (born 22 August 1996) is an English former actress and television presenter from Rochdale, Greater Manchester, who is known for appearing as Emily James in the BBC school drama Waterloo Road. She was also a presenter on Friday Download and had starred in its film, Up All Night. From 2013 to 2015, Flynn starred in the CBBC children's show Dani's Castle.

In 2022, Flynn stopped acting and moved to Melbourne, Australia and is qualified as a counsellor.

== Career ==
Flynn's acting career began in 2008 with some small roles in theatre productions. In 2009, she joined the cast of the BBC One drama Waterloo Road as Emily James alongside Jenna Coleman.

In 2012, she was cast in the CBBC children's television programme Dani's Castle alongside Dani Harmer. The show began airing in 2013 and a second series began airing in 2014. The show was renewed for a third series, which was filmed in 2014 and began airing on 7 July 2015.

In 2012, she made her first appearance on the CBBC children's entertainment show Friday Download as a guest presenter, and in 2013 she joined the main presenting team. In 2014, she was cast in the Friday Download movie Up All Night. Filming began on 6 September 2014. Up All Night was released on 22 May 2015.

On 14 April 2015, Flynn announced that she would not be returning for the ninth series of Friday Download.

On 4 March 2016, Flynn began playing Lauren, the bully of Bethany Platt (Lucy Fallon), in the long-running ITV soap opera Coronation Street. Her final appearance as Lauren was broadcast on 30 September 2016.

== Filmography ==
=== Television ===
Years	Title	Role	Notes	Ref(s)
2009–2012	Waterloo Road	Emily James	Regular role	
2011	Holby City	Beatrice "Bean" Fisher	Guest role	
2011	Scott & Bailey	Elise Scott	Regular role	
2011	Shameless	Grace	Guest role	
2012	Doctors	Cleo Hardey	Guest role	
2012	Friday Download	Herself	Guest presenter	
2013	Hacker Time	Herself	Guest	
2013-2014	Jedward's Big Adventure	Herself	Guest; 2 episodes	
2013–2015	Friday Download	Herself	Presenter	
2013–2015	Dani's Castle	Kait / Roxy	Began playing Roxy in Series 2	
2016	Coronation Street	Lauren	Recurring role; 14 episodes	
2017	Doctors	Myra	Guest role	
2018	Radio 1 Stories	Steph	Guest role	
2019	Flatmates	Kelly	Episode 3	

=== Radio ===
Date	Title	Role	Station	Ref(s)
2010	Lilo	Simone	BBC Radio 4	
2010	Sherbet Dolls	Olivia	BBC Radio 4	
2011	Lost Property: The Year My Mother Went Missing	Ruthie	BBC Radio 4 Afternoon Play	
2011	Betsy Coleman	Young Betsy	BBC Radio 4	
2011	Raft To Bondi	Carol	BBC Radio 4	
2012	Mad Girl	Rose	BBC Radio 4	

=== Theatre ===
Years	Title	Role	Theater	!Ref(s)
2008	Macbeth	Weird Sister	Manchester Royal Exchange	
2008	Babes In The Wood	Jill	Gracie Fields Theatre	
2009	Annie	Annie	Gracie Fields Theatre	
2018–2019	Cinderella	Cinderella	Palace Theatre and Opera House	
2019–2020	Cinderella	Cinderella	Buxton Opera House	
