= List of Wolfblood episodes =

Wolfblood is a teen supernatural-drama television series, broadcast on the CBBC channel in the United Kingdom, and also shown worldwide. A webisode titled "The Scape Goat" takes place between the first and second series. A series of seven webisodes known as Jana Bites takes place between the second and third series. An online animated motion comic known as New Moon Rising, which comes in three parts, takes place between the third and fourth series. An online animated motion comic known as Hunter's Moon, which comes in three parts, takes place between the fourth and fifth series. Ten mini-episodes known as Wolfblood Secrets, which also takes place between the fourth and fifth series, has aired. An extra webisode called Lore aired 19 October 2016. An online animated motion comic known as Alpha, which is in three parts, takes place after the fourth series. As of 1 May 2017, 61 episodes of Wolfblood have aired, concluding the fifth series.

== Series overview ==
Series	Episodes	Originally released	
Series	Episodes	First released	Last released
1	13	10 September 2012	22 October 2012
2	13	9 September 2013	21 October 2013
3	13	15 September 2014	27 October 2014
4	12	8 March 2016	13 April 2016
5	10	27 February 2017	1 May 2017

== Episodes ==
=== Series 1 (2012) ===
No. overall	No. in series	Title	Directed by	Written by	Original release date	UK viewers (millions)
1	1	"Lone Wolf"	Will Sinclair	Debbie Moon	10 September 2012	N/A
A girl is home alone on a full moon when she hears a noise outside... She bravely goes to see what it is and is confronted by two wolves escaping from INSIDE her house! She controls them back into the cellar - her eyes flashing golden - who is this girl? She's Maddy Smith and she's a wolfblood. Fourteen-year-old Maddy Smith is hiding an extraordinary secret about who she really is, belonging to a half-human species of wolfbloods, even from her closest friends. After letting her parents out of the locked cellar—their "den," and only place in their lives free of humans—she scolds them for breaking out of the cellar the night before, and they promise her that once she can transform, she'll understand the pull of the moon. She goes to school and faces her best friends Tom Okanawe, a loyal boy and football enthusiast, and Shannon Kelly, resident beast hunter. Shannon is ranting about a paw print she found on the moors, but Maddy is distracted by the scent of another wolfblood in the school. She meets this second wolfblood soon in morning registration, a boy called Rhydian Morris who doesn't take kindly to Maddy's amazed comment that he "smells like her parents." Later, she scolds him for being on her pack's territory and he shrugs her off. After attacking fellow classmate and school bully Jimi, Rhydian is quickly pulled into the school's darkroom by Maddy, where he transforms into a wolf and Maddy turns her eyes yellow to calm him. He quickly transforms back and is excited to see that she's like him, but she yells at him for "showing off" and tells him he doesn't belong there. He leaves, but Maddy soon discovers Rhydian has been in foster care since he was two and has no idea what he is or how to control it. She chases him down and begs him to stay, where he accuses her of wanting him to live a lie like her. After a chase through the forest turns into an unexpected encounter with Shannon and Tom, Maddy lies that Rhydian is a distant relative and says he is part of her life now. He reluctantly agrees to stay in Stoneybridge, and they walk home together. When Rhydian reveals he thinks that they're werewolves, Maddy tells him that it's "wolfblood" and not "werewolf" and that they are not monsters. She says that being a wolfblood is genetic, and that everything Rhydian thought made him a freak—sight, hearing, smell, speed—are all normal for wolfbloods. She invites him to join her pack so they can teach him, but he insists on staying a lone wolf, saying he knows more than Maddy—having transformed three times before while Maddy has yet to take wolf form—and can take care of himself.
2	2	"Mysterious Developments"	Will Sinclair	James Whitehouse & Hannah George	11 September 2012	N/A
When Shannon shows a photo around school, a blurry silhouette of something with yellowish eyes, Maddy realises it's a photo of a transformed wolfblood. When classmates ask to see the raw files for the image, Shannon takes them to the darkroom to show them, but the memory card has vanished. She assumes Jimi is responsible, but Maddy can smell that Rhydian has been in the darkroom, too. She confronts him later, accusing him of being the wolf in the photo, which he denies angrily. He gives her the memory card and tells her to give it back to Shannon if she wants to so bad, but she instead takes it home and deletes the photos, discussing her misery being so dishonest to her friends with her mother. Rhydian finds Shannon on the moors, crying and embarrassed after having no proof of the beast again, and comforts her with a bar of vegan chocolate. He asks why she's so interested in this beast, and she recalls a time when she was camping with the Brownies when she was seven and spotted a large creature with a hairy face and yellow eyes outside late at night. She never saw this beast again but has hunted for it relentlessly since. The next day, Rhydian has dinner with the Smiths to discuss safe wolfblood living, and they supply Rhydian with the meat he's been craving since moving in with his vegetarian foster family. While showing him the family's "den," their cellar where they transform during the full moon to stay hidden from humans, Rhydian and Maddy discover that there are wolfbloods who don't lock themselves away and instead roam free and aggressive, called wild wolfbloods. This causes trouble when Tom and Shannon go beast-hunting in the woods. Maddy realises it really wasn't Rhydian in Shannon's photographs and they tell her parents, but when the Smiths leave to help Maddy and Rhydian don't think they'll make it in time. They run into the woods and arrive just in time to fight off the wild wolfblood; Rhydian transforms to fight while Maddy guides everyone else to safety. Maddy uses Shannon's camera to blind the "beast" with the flash, scaring the wild wolfblood off and saving Rhydian from serious injury. The group regathers and the Smiths arrive, with Emma privately scolding Rhydian for bringing her daughter into danger.
3	3	"Family Ties"	Will Sinclair	Debbie Moon	17 September 2012	N/A
Bradlington High holds a presentation on the students' artwork representing their families. After the K's make fun of his original, solemn, drawing, Rhydian draws a sarcastic happy family and storms out of the auditorium, snapping at Maddy when she follows him that she's just "pretty and fake" like the others. Jimi glares as his usually cold father tells Tom how impressed he is by his work. Tom waits for his own father to arrive and is still there when the presentation ends and the others go home, saying his dad is just late to pick him up for a weekend trip. The students arrive after the weekend and find the auditorium demolished, with each project completely destroyed. Jeffries announces the cancellation of the End of Year Disco—unless the culprit is found. Jimi reminds his classmates that Rhydian smashed up the darkroom on his first day at Bradlington High, and others tell Jeffries that Rhydian was still sulking outside on Friday when everyone was leaving. Rhydian is questioned by Jeffries, but Maddy whispers to him outside the door and narrowly keeps him from wolfing out. Rhydian comes to suspect Tom, noticing that Tom sweats and his heart races whenever he talks about his "great" relationship with his father. After Shannon realises the culprit would have a project's "invisible ink" on their shoes, the four begin shining a blacklight on the shoes of their peers. Tom confesses to Maddy that his father never showed up on Friday, being too busy with his baby daughter and Tom's half-sister. Maddy, seeing that Tom's work was the most defaced and also suspecting Tom by now, shines the light over his shoes and sees that he is innocent. He argues with her before leaving the school and coming face to face with his father. He runs off, and Maddy follows his scent and apologises to him, encouraging him to give his father another chance. Tom laments that his father is always busy with his new wife and baby daughter, and can't seem to see that Tom needs him, too. Maddy reminds him that his father's here now, and Tom decides to spend time with him while he can. Rhydian shines the blacklight over random lockers in the hall, before shining them absentmindedly over a pair of shoes hanging from the locker—the shoes are covered in the ink. Jimi grabs the shoes and reveals that they are his, and Rhydian chases him around the school demanding to know why he trashed the auditorium. He wonders if Jimi did it just to use it against Rhydian, but Jimi says that not everything is about him, and that Rhydian is lucky not to have parents that are constantly disappointed in him. Jimi's father, who is very wealthy, overhears this semi-confession and marches Jimi to Jeffries' office, saying Jimi will pay for all the damages with his allowance. Rhydian meets up with Maddy and Shannon and, seeing Jimi and his father drive by while his father shouts at him, says that maybe he is lucky to be on his own. Maddy, looking between herself and Shannon, says that he's not on his own at all.
4	4	"Cry Wolf"	Will Sinclair	Clare Saxby	18 September 2012	0.294
Maddy is on the brink of her first full blown transformation and she's struggling to keep her wolf-side hidden, but insists on going to take an important test at school. Her mother gives her a bottle of "rescue remedy," which shatters before she even enters the school. After she promises to study with Tom during lunch and accidentally blows him off to run in the woods with Rhydian, Shannon finds herself angry with Maddy, too. During the exam, Maddy's stress levels reach their peak and she begins veining up, her eyes turning yellow, and she looks to Rhydian for help. He runs to the fire alarm and triggers it, and Shannon scolds him outside as the students gather. He's taken to the Head's office and Maddy snaps at Shannon to back off, but Shannon yells at Maddy for her cruelty to Tom. Afterwards, Tom sides with Jimi and plans to cheat on the exam and Shannon goes with popular girl Kara to study. Kara sneaks them into the school science lab and plays with chemicals that were mistakenly left out, and Tom is nearly caught sneaking answer sheets from Jeffries' office before Rhydian covers for him. Rhydian says he does not want to know what Tom was doing, as he has nothing against secrets, and Tom has a new respect for him. Meanwhile, Kara spills some of the chemicals after Maddy comes in to apologise to an unreceptive Shannon. The chemicals cause a fire that Kara escapes, but Maddy and Shannon are trapped inside. Maddy begins to transform due to her proximity to the fire and Shannon catches a glimpse of this before passing out with Maddy. Rhydian gets help from Tom and Mr. Jeffries and they rescue the girls. Shannon wakes up, seeming traumatized by the whole situation, and later tells Tom that she saw Maddy "change" in the fire. He blames the chemical fumes, but she insists that Maddy has been the beast; she'd had yellow eyes. Outside the school the next morning, Tom meets up with Maddy and they make up, with Tom deciding not to cheat on the exam after all. He then jokes that Shannon now believes Maddy is a werewolf due to her near-change in the fire, which is too close a guess than she can handle; she chugs her new bottle of rescue remedy.
5	5	"Occam's Razor"	Declan O'Dwyer	Debbie Moon	24 September 2012	0.416
On the day of her first full moon transformation, Maddy joins her school on a trip to the old Lindisfarne Island, which is known for legends about a ghost dog that attacks anyone wandering alone late at night. When Rhydian feigns an injury so he can stay on the island that night, the whole class becomes trapped and Maddy and Rhydian must plan how to sneak away before the moon rises. Shannon wants to test her werewolf theories and believes that Rhydian is helping Maddy keep her lycanthropy a secret. Tom suggests that they could try the Occam's Razor theory, which is that the simplest explanation is usually the right explanation, and that the simplest explanation is that they are dating, even though they are supposedly "distant cousins". Maddy and Rhydian manage to sneak out (where, in a scene cut from the US version of the show, Maddy realises Rhydian faked his injury and scolds him) and Maddy transforms for the first time. The two roam the beach and tunnels in wolf form, but are almost caught by Shannon and Tom, who see a dog-like thing run past them. The group gathers in the morning and Maddy and Rhydian take turns talking their way out of Shannon's suspicions, and Tom becomes convinced that they just saw the ghost dog last night. Shannon remains suspicious, however, and Maddy later tells Rhydian how excited she is to be a wolfblood now that she's transformed.
6	6	"Maddy Cool"	Declan O'Dwyer	James Whitehouse & Hannah George	25 September 2012	0.411
With the energy of her first full transformation still coursing through her veins, Maddy succumbs to its power and interrupts the dance performance of Kay, earning the praise of her peers and the ire of her teachers. After Kay's crush, Dean, takes notice in Maddy, the K's invite Maddy to Kay's birthday party in an attempt to lure Dean there. Tom reminds Maddy that the party is on Shannon's movie night, and they all have plans together. When she tells the K's, they invite Shannon, Tom, and Rhydian as well. Even still, Tom and Shannon refuse to go, and Maddy says she just wanted to have fun for once. When Shannon is offended at the idea that they don't have any fun, Maddy storms off and remains in a bad mood the rest of the day. Overnight she develops a rebellious new punk identity with coloured hair extensions and heavy makeup. She acts out in class and Tom's apparent crush on her intensifies. After getting some encouragement and aftershave, he goes to ask Maddy out, but when he sees her in the darkroom she is face-to-face arguing with Rhydian; to him it looks as if they are about to kiss. Rhydian continues fighting with Maddy, who has become a bit of a bully even to her friends, but she is power-drunk and won't listen. She narrowly hides her dark veins and yellow eyes when Shannon walks in on them, calling her a freak as she storms away. After initially going to the incorrect address provided by the K's, Maddy crashes Kay's birthday party and throws food on her. Kay runs off and Maddy goes after her, realising how horrible she's being, and tries to have a heart-to-heart before Kara and Katrina interrupt. Maddy defends Shannon and Tom—who are there for potential werewolf evidence and dating Rhydian evidence, respectively—when the K's call them freaks, saying that they are her freaks. Maddy makes amends with her friends, including Rhydian, and heads home.
7	7	"Dark Moon"	Declan O'Dwyer	Jonny Kurzman	1 October 2012	0.422
It's the day of the dark moon, and Maddy and Rhydian have lost all of their wolfblood powers. Rhydian passes out during a drama class after nearly wolfing out and is taken to hospital to have a blood test. Maddy, Shannon and Tom go to the hospital to visit him. Tom and Shannon go to see Tom's mom, who is Rhydian's doctor, whilst Maddy tries to get Rhydian out of the hospital before they take his blood; any blood test would reveal his half-human nature. They don't escape in time and Maddy passes out too, and both she and Rhydian have blood samples taken. Shannon is overjoyed that Maddy's blood will be tested, sure that this will reveal her werewolf nature, and Tom scolds her for celebrating the possible illness of their best friend. He points out that even if Shannon is correct, which he strongly denies, the government would only take Maddy away and test on her for the rest of her life or worse, and Shannon admits that she doesn't want that to happen. Maddy convinces Rhydian to try and steal their blood back, but they fail and the blood is tested. Shockingly, the only anomaly found in their blood is that they are both a very rare blood type, which Tom owes to their supposed relation. Shannon, humiliated by the test results, runs away and Maddy follows her, assuring her that she doesn't hate Shannon for thinking her to be a werewolf. She tells Shannon that she still loves her and wants to be friends again, saying that one day Shannon will find her beast and prove everyone wrong. They hug, and the group leaves the hospital. Maddy's parents reveal that wolfbloods are completely human during the dark moon, even down to their DNA, and that they got extremely lucky. Maddy tells Rhydian she wants to stick to being human for a while to keep from losing her friends again, and he reluctantly agrees to do the same, earning a kiss on the cheek from Maddy.
8	8	"Wolfsbane"	Declan O'Dwyer	Kirstie Falkous	2 October 2012	0.427
During a sleepover with her friends at Shannon's, Shannon reveals that she has been mapping out where she thinks the beast has been around the village and wants to go hunt for it. Maddy has a cold and so Shannon gives her a herbal pill to make her feel better. It turns out to contain wolfsbane, which causes Maddy to partially transform into her wolf; she has yellow eyes, sharp teeth and an intense hunger. Rhydian tries desperately to restrain her before she reveals them both, dragging her upstairs and locking both of them in the bathroom so he can show Maddy her reflection. Tom and Shannon race up the stairs after them and Rhydian lies that Maddy's being sick. Neither of them believe it, and while Tom is jealous of Rhydian, Shannon thinks Maddy is faking for attention from the boys. Rhydian finds online that thistle root can reverse the effects of wolfsbane but doesn't have time to find any before Shannon snaps and leaves for the woods alone, taking a bowl of meat as bait, and Rhydian and Tom follow her to make sure she is safe. Rhydian, Tom and Shannon go hunting for the beast on the moors whilst Maddy escapes and hunts down the nearest source of meat. Rhydian finds thistle root and tackles Maddy, forcing her to eat it, which brings her back to normal. She tells Shannon she had an allergic reaction to the herb pill and they reconcile. Back at the house, she jokes with Shannon and Tom and tells Rhydian how happy she is to be doing normal things again with normal people, and Rhydian says there is nothing normal about her friends.
9	9	"A Quiet Night In"	Andrew Gunn	Debbie Moon	8 October 2012	0.421
Rhydian agrees to spend the full moon in the den with Maddy and her parents, but after finding an abandoned box of Sinclair clothes he takes some for himself, with Maddy taking some for her, Shannon, and Tom. Shannon doesn't want the clothes, and Maddy begins to feel guilty, though Rhydian quickly sells the extra shirt to a classmate and shrugs when Maddy refuses to take some of the money. He goes back to steal more clothes and sells them to the popular K's and Jimi, though they are caught with the stolen clothes and narrowly manage to cover for Rhydian and themselves. He swears off stealing but Jimi's friends Liam and Sam threaten to turn him in if he won't bring them Sinclair clothes for free, so he goes to get the clothes for the last time. After a chase with police, he reaches the local cafe Bernie's and attempts to give Sam and Liam the shirts, but they pretend not to know him and reveal a police officer standing right behind him. He is arrested and the Smiths rush to help him, pretending to be his foster family. They are unable to get him released that night, and Maddy's mother tells her to run so she won't be found out at moonrise. Maddy, however, comes up with a plan and tells her father to tell police that Rhydian has clinical lycanthropy and will hurt himself "transforming" when the moon rises. He actually does begin to transform and police quickly release him before he can destroy their cell, and the Smiths and Rhydian run to the woods to transform. Rhydian and Maddy talk about how much fun it was to transform outside as a pack on the way into school the next morning, with a crowd of classmates slowly gathering around them, baffled that Rhydian isn't still in jail. Rhydian laughs it off and goes inside with Maddy.
10	10	"The Call of the Wild"	Andrew Gunn	Debbie Moon	9 October 2012	0.479
Whilst messing around outside, Maddy, Tom, Shannon, and Rhydian spot another person watching them from the trees. Maddy and Rhydian can't find any trace of the other person beside a footprint and a faint scent, recognising it to be the wild wolfblood they fought previously. This wild wolfblood catches Rhydian alone later and reveals that she is his biological mother and he flees, spotting her again outside his foster family's home. The next day at school Maddy plans to hunt down the wild wolfblood but Rhydian refuses, saying he wants to forget she ever existed. At Bernie's he reveals that she is his mother, and Maddy encourages him to speak with her despite his anger at having been abandoned, saying that he doesn't know what really happened when he was two and won't know unless he asks his mother. His mother, Ceri, arrives at Bernie's and Maddy leaves the two alone, though she embarrasses Rhydian by not knowing how to drink from a mug and by being dirty and disheveled. Jimi mocks her and she snarls in his face before running off with Rhydian. He tells her he is embarrassed of her and she says he shouldn't be, that she can teach him everything about being a wolfblood, even things that Maddy's "tame" family can't teach. She tells him that she'd been hunting for food and had left Rhydian in a safe place when he was found and taken by humans, only being able to track him after sensing his first transformation, and that she wants to bring her son home. She shows him eolas, a supernatural ability to connect to nature, giving its user the ability to track anyone or see anything. He is happy to bond with his mother and see more of what it means to be a wolfblood, and plans to leave with her for the wild. Maddy learns this and tries to stop him, but he tells her it's his decision to make. However, his heightened speed and athleticism gets him placed in the school's football team and he plays in a match, overwhelmed and happy by the feeling of finally belonging to a pack and being good at something. He goes to Ceri and tells her that he doesn't want to leave the human world, the football team, or Maddy, and Ceri lashes out before running off without him. He goes back to the others, with Maddy being overjoyed that he is staying, and they leave for Bernie's to celebrate winning the match.
11	11	"Eolas"	Andrew Gunn	Clare Saxby	15 October 2012	0.418
Rhydian shows off using eolas in school and Maddy demands to know what he is doing. He shares the secret with Maddy, though she passes out while using eolas after getting too close to some pylons, and her parents tell her not to see Rhydian or use eolas anymore. She runs away instead, going to Rhydian to ask him to leave with her, but he calls her selfish and tells her to just go home to her family that loves her. Betrayed, she runs off anyhow and Rhydian joins her parents as they search frantically for her. Her mother reveals that when she was younger, her cousin Louise discovered eolas and went mad with it, running off into the wild never to be seen again; her worst fear is losing Maddy the same way. Maddy passes out again while hiding in the back of a truck and wakes up in town, stumbling into an alley and getting cornered by a few older girls who mean to rob her. She musters up enough strength to growl at them, though she is still weakened. Her mother follows her scent into town and finds her, wolfing out on the older girls and scaring them away, and Maddy apologises for her behavior. She tries to ask her mother not to baby her so much, however, and the two bicker but return home together with the others.
12	12	"Caged"	Andrew Gunn	Kirstie Falkous	16 October 2012	0.357
It's a full moon and out-of-town beast hunter Kyle enlists Shannon and Tom to help him track down the beast of Stoneybridge. Maddy and Rhydian decide they can't live with the idea of staying in the basement every full moon and take to the woods, locking her parents in the cellar. Meanwhile, Kyle and crew make preparations to capture 'the beast' in a large box using multiple kinds of bait, while Kyle's documentarian films the process. Maddy and Rhydian cannot resist the wolf bait and transform, running right into Kyle's hands. Kyle successfully takes both of them down, locking them in a crate, then decides to take them to sell, thinking they're normal wolves thought to be extinct in Britain. Shannon, Tom, and Jo (the filmmaker) take a short-cut to stop Kyle's truck and save the wolves. The next morning, with foggy memories of the prior evening, Maddy decides to tell her parents what happened and accept the consequences of having gone against them and run out into the wild.
13	13	"Irresistible"	Andrew Gunn	Debbie Moon	22 October 2012	0.540
Shannon becomes determined to get the two wolves protected and plans to use Kyle's remaining bait to lure them to her and photograph them, proving their existence. Knowing any wolfbloods in town would be unable to resist the bait and would thus expose themselves, Maddy and Rhydian plan to find the bait themselves but are separated by Maddy's parents, who blame Rhydian for putting them in this position. They lock themselves in the house and tell Maddy they can't help Rhydian anymore, which infuriates her. Meanwhile, a younger wolfblood named Bryn arrives and tells Rhydian that he is his younger brother that has come to take him "home" to the wild. Ceri has been inconsolable since Rhydian rejected her, and Bryn is determined to reunite his family. He tries to expose his and Rhydian's wolfblood nature to force Rhydian to leave with him but is only laughed at and embarrassed. They catch Ceri's scent as she enters the territory to find Bryn, but Shannon and Tom have found the bait and set it off. Maddy sneaks out and runs to find her friends, using a mask to keep from losing control and shouting at her friends to run as the approaching Ceri begins to wolf out. She transforms and tackles Ceri, now also in wolf form, and Rhydian also wolfs out before telling them all to stop. Shannon and Tom, witnessing all of this, run off in shock after photographing them in wolf form, and the Smiths arrive to find their secret has been exposed. They blame Rhydian and he says he will leave with his mother and brother, calling Ceri ‘mum' for the first time, and Maddy heartbrokenly leaves with her parents. Rhydian goes to stop Shannon and Tom from uploading the photos, reminding them that it would only hurt Maddy and her family, and leaves for the wild with his family. Shannon and Tom go to Maddy's house and hand over their photos, promising not to tell anyone about her secret. She realises Rhydian has really left, and Tom assures her that Rhydian loved her. She asks if Rhydian said that himself, and Tom says he didn't have to.

=== Series 2 (2013) ===
No. overall	No. in series	Title	Directed by	Written by	Original release date	UK viewers (millions)
14	1	"Leader of the Pack"	Stewart Svaasand	Debbie Moon	9 September 2013	0.422
On a full moon, Maddy and her parents gather in their cellar, laughing about a dog-chew Tom has innocently gifted them. They laugh further about an ornate owl decoration which Shannon has made for them, and which is secretly recording them via a hidden camera. Shannon is in the woods watching this camera's feed when Tom catches her and scolds her, and she promises to remove the camera. They are initially enamored by the video of Maddy and her parents transforming into wolves but are interrupted by the appearance of a wolf in the woods with them, realising that Rhydian has returned to Stoneybridge after three months. He is chased by three wolves from the wild, led by pack-leader Alric, who want to take him back to the wild. He, Shannon, and Tom make it to Maddy's house and hide in the den with the Smiths, and the wild wolfbloods leave. The next morning Rhydian says the pack is angry with him and hates him for the same reason the Smiths hated him, for being different and for not blindly following rules. He tries to leave but Maddy stops him, telling him she doesn't care what he's supposed to have done in the wild and just wants him home again. At school, Maddy and Rhydian face the wild wolfbloods when they appear with the help of Tom and Shannon, projecting photos of the wild wolfbloods veining up and yellow-eyed on a screen in a classroom. Maddy, using the wild wolfbloods' lack of knowledge of the internet, threatens to send the images around the world with the click of a button. Alric challenges this by saying even a tame wolf knows the secret is most important, but Maddy says her pack is most important and she'll tell the whole world if it means protecting Rhydian. The wild wolfbloods leave without him after declaring that their pack and Maddy's are now enemies, and she and Rhydian sit outside later to try and lighten the mood. Rhydian says he's glad he came back, and Maddy says he's not half as glad as she is.
15	2	"The Girl from Nowhere"	Stewart Svaasand	Debbie Moon	10 September 2013	0.328
Maddy's parents let Rhydian stay with them for the time being and help him set up his bedroom, trying to get things back to normal. Emma frames his sketches for him and Daniel welcomes him back to the pack. Meanwhile, Maddy comes face-to-face with another wolfblood girl outside and has a standoff before Rhydian lets the other girl escape. He says that this wild wolfblood is Jana, the daughter of Alric. They worry that she's been sent to the Smith home as a test, but the Smiths tell Maddy and Rhydian to go to school as normal. The two arrive at school and find that Jana has followed them there, too, saying she wants to attend school like a human. They pull her into the darkroom and interrogate her, but she says she's been exiled by her father for defending Rhydian. To stop suspicions arising, Maddy and Rhydian have documents fabricated for Jana and try to clean her up and teach her control, only narrowly succeeding. The Smiths think Jana is too much of a risk and try to chase her out, but Maddy eventually comes around and sees Jana's genuine attempts to get along in the human world and begs her parents to let her stay. Jana finds an old caravan in the woods and says she'll mend it and keep to herself, promising to leave if the Smiths think she's causing too much trouble. Later, she overhears Rhydian telling Maddy that Jana basically saved his life in the wild, and smiles to herself.
16	3	"Grave Consequences"	Stewart Svaasand	James Whitehouse & Hannah George	16 September 2013	0.375
Liam finds what he believes is a werewolf skeleton on his father's land and calls Dr. Whitewood, a scientist who has a particular interest in unusual skeletons and an affinity for werewolves. Jana wants the bones to be given a decent burial in line with an ancient wild wolfblood tradition, though Maddy and Rhydian choose to leave the bones and keep their heads down. Their curiosity wins out and they go with Jana to Liam's field, where Jana uses ansion on the bones, a rare supernatural ability that allows its user to see the past of an object. She sees that the bones belong to a wolfblood from Maddy's pack killed mid-transformation generations before. Jeffries takes his class to watch Whitewood and her team work on the bones, and after she announces her intention to do DNA tests on the skeleton, Maddy and Rhydian decide to steal the bones for burial. They enlist Shannon's and Tom's help, despite Jana not knowing that they are aware of the wolfblood secret, and the pair act as clumsy decoys. Rhydian locks Jana in Maddy's shed to prevent her from wolfing out on any humans on the field. After Liam boasts about his ancestor killing a werewolf—unknowingly, Maddy's ancestor—Maddy attacks him and splits her lip; Shannon intervenes and suffers a cut ear. The adults take them back to the tent to clean them up, but Shannon spots Whitewood slipping a bandage with Maddy's blood on it into a plastic bag and then into her pocket. Maddy and Rhydian collapse the tent and steal the bones from Whitewood's car, only narrowly escaping when the Smiths release Jana and she runs onto the field. She is infuriated to learn Tom and Shannon know the secret, but Rhydian reminds her they couldn't have gotten the bones without Tom's and Shannon's help. They are preparing for the burial when Shannon texts Maddy that Dr. Whitewood has her DNA. Shannon and Tom arrive and Shannon says she swapped the blood sample for hers when the tent collapsed. They all gather to bury the bones and Jana realises she does appreciate Tom's and Shannon's help and invites them to join in the ceremony.
17	4	"Total Eclipse of the Moon"	Stewart Svaasand	James Whitehouse & Hannah George	17 September 2013	0.408
A total eclipse falls on a full moon, and Jana is determined to have Rhydian join her to understand what being a wolfblood really means; during an eclipse, wolfbloods experience the same mental transformation that they would during a full moon, but remain in human form and retain human thoughts and emotions. He tries to convince Maddy to attend the Lunar Festival with them that night but she reminds him that the eclipse would still turn their eyes yellow. Meanwhile, Shannon is discovered to be a singer, and school boy-band leader Harry Averwood notices and wants her to sing for the Lunar Festival, but stage-fright humiliates her during rehearsals. Having laughed at Shannon's terrible performance, Jana makes it up to her by giving her dohldrenc, a wild wolfblood remedy meant to bring out one's inner strength. Shannon takes it and her newfound confidence allows her to sing without error. She becomes more insecure the night of the Festival, however, and takes too much of the potion and has "wolfblood symptoms": hearing, smelling, and seeing everything and becoming deathly afraid of fire. Maddy and Rhydian trick the Smiths into allowing them to attend the Festival, and they find Jana in the woods. They mess around and bond, and Maddy uses eolas to see Shannon's performance. Seeing that Shannon is in trouble, the pack races to find her while Tom finds a more human solution by making Shannon drink a banana milkshake until she throws up the dohldrenc. The pack arrives and Shannon says she won't perform, though the eclipse has an intense effect on Maddy and she snaps, telling Shannon she can be a scared little kid for the rest of her life or prove everybody wrong. The wolfbloods run off as the eclipse ends and they begin to transform, and Shannon decides to perform after all. The pack hear her flawless performance from the woods in wolf-form and howl, and Shannon and Tom hear this and share a smile.
18	5	"Ancient Grudge"	Roger Simonsz	Richard Kurti & Bev Doyle	23 September 2013	0.378
While walking to school, Jana is ambushed by Alric and pulled into a hug; the two share meat and are clearly happy to see each other. It emerges that Alric did not exile Jana, but rather sent her to Stoneybridge with the intention of separating Rhydian from his friends and luring him back to the wild. Alric says this is taking too long and they must return to the wild tonight, intimidating Jana into agreeing. She goes to the school and tells Rhydian that Alric has sworn to forgive them both if they return to the wild, but Rhydian flatly refuses. She says she will have to return regardless so that she can lead the pack after her father, but that without Rhydian's return the wild pack will never be allowed to return to Stoneybridge and Rhydian will never see his mother, brother, or Jana again. Shannon, determined to get more dohldrenc, goes to Jana's caravan but finds nothing. She sees Jana and Alric talking and Jana narrowly prevents Alric from breaking into the caravan to reach her. They leave, discussing how the wild pack will come for their own retribution if Rhydian will not return on his own. Jana comes up with a desperate compromise: Jana and Rhydian will meet Alric in the woods, Rhydian will beg forgiveness, Jana will return to the wild with Alric as his witness, and his honor will be restored. Alric agrees, seeming proud of Jana's quick thinking, and Shannon hurries back to the school to tell Maddy and Tom what she has seen. Maddy confronts Rhydian and Jana and tells Rhydian not to go anywhere near Alric, while Jana demands that he come back with her, and he tells them both that it's his decision. After a lesson in English about Romeo and Juliet and their families' ancient grudge, Maddy accepts Rhydian's decision to meet with Alric to make amends so that he can see his family again and so they won't lose Jana forever. They go to Bernie's for a proper goodbye to Jana and she and Rhydian set off, with Rhydian promising to return soon with everything mended. They meet with Alric and he reveals the meeting to be a trap, with one of the wild beta wolves, Aran, trapping Rhydian. Alric struggles with Jana when she tries to stop them. She pleads with Alric to let Rhydian go and Aran reveals that the pack has turned against Alric and will exile him and Jana if they do not return with Rhydian's pelt. Maddy, Shannon, and Tom arrive and Maddy stands off against Alric while Shannon and Tom trap Aran. Maddy, Rhydian, and Alric wolf out, with Jana wolfing out as well and joining Maddy and Rhydian. Betrayed, Alric changes back and pleads with Jana to help him one last time, but she refuses, devastated that he would lie to her and harm her friends. He disowns her, and he and Aran run off as Jana collapses in despair. At school, Tom worries about an upcoming judo-match with Jimi, and Jana and Maddy tell him he should have learned from the fight with Alric; never take your eye off the enemy. Tom fights Jimi and manages to knock him off his feet while he's distracted posing for the cameras. Tom wins, and the pack celebrates. Maddy and Rhydian return home, but their happy mood is quashed when the Smiths reveal they have packed all of Rhydian's things and are moving him back in with his former foster-family.
19	6	"Mottled Poppy"	Roger Simonsz	Richard Kurti & Bev Doyle	24 September 2013	0.375
Shannon, Tom, and the Smiths go on a road-trip and stop at a gas station called the Mottled Poppy. Maddy is still angry with her parents for kicking Rhydian out without talking to them about it, but they insist he should bond with his foster-family again, though her mother Emma reveals that she just didn't want Maddy and Rhydian "getting too close". Maddy's father, Daniel, speaks with the gas station's owner Bob Driscoll and is fascinated by a flower on the front desk: a white poppy that develops bright red spots when Daniel draws near. Seeming shocked, Driscoll goes outside to call someone and says that the poppy changed colour. Rhydian takes Jana to the woods to ease her depression but fails, and she eventually confesses that she came to Stoneybridge on purpose to trick Rhydian into returning to the wild, but that she had no idea Alric would try to hurt him. Rhydian is momentarily upset, but soon forgives her and promises not to tell the others. He offers to show her more of the human world and uses his key to Maddy's house to show Jana the den. The Smiths' car has broken down and Driscoll offers to take them to his house to repair it. Upon entering, Shannon notices a painting with a haunting pair of yellow eyes in the background. In a sitting room, Shannon, Tom, and Maddy find a wolf-rug hidden under a table and an imprint where it once was. They realise that Mr. Driscoll and his wife must have hidden it and that they know that the Smiths are wolfbloods. Shannon and Tom go to find their coats while Maddy researches the gas station on Shannon's computer, but Shannon and Tom come up empty-handed and hurry to find Emma and Daniel. Emma finds Maddy and sees the description of the mottled poppy, which states that "when the spots appear, the wolf is near." As Maddy tries to save the page, she finds Shannon's files from the hidden camera in the Smiths' cellar. Shannon comes in and Maddy and Emma confront her, with Shannon saying the camera is old and she'd forgotten it. Maddy finds a live link, however, and upon seeing Rhydian and Jana sneaking around the den she begins to wolf out over everyone lying to her. Mrs. Driscoll appears and Emma hides Maddy, saying there's been a family emergency and that they've got to leave. Mrs. Driscoll tricks them into going down to the basement where Daniel and Tom are restrained, and the Driscolls reveal their plan to keep the Smiths, Tom, and Shannon down there until the full moon so they can film them transforming. Shannon says she's human and has been secretly gathering evidence of the "werewolves" and the Driscolls release her, upon which she frees the Smiths and Tom and they run to the car, narrowly escaping before the Driscolls can fire an old blunderbuss at them. They return home and Shannon takes her owl-camera back, and Maddy goes to see Rhydian and Jana. Angry that Rhydian has been ignoring her messages to sneak around with Jana, Maddy takes back his house key and storms off.
20	7	"Top Dog"	Roger Simonsz	Richard Kurti & Bev Doyle	30 September 2013	0.421
The pack is falling to pieces, with Rhydian taking no one's side as Jana and Shannon team up and Tom hangs around Jimi. A school-council competition inspires Jana to take a leadership position; Maddy runs her own campaign, determined to become top dog. Shannon helps in Jana's somewhat successful campaign as Maddy's fails, and Jimi begins bribing voters. Kara, also running, focuses on fashion and brings most of the girls onto her side. After Shannon retrieves her camera from her owl, planting it and filming Jimi's bribery, Maddy tells Jana about Shannon's other hidden camera and Jana confronts her in the printer-room. Jimi locks them in together, overhearing the argument, and Jana begins to wolf out. Maddy and Rhydian run to the rescue and talk Jana down while Tom gets the key off Jimi, and Maddy insists that she was wrong to bring up the camera because Shannon is not a threat to them; she's loyal and a member of the pack. Jana calms down and the pack reconcile, with Jana and Maddy stepping down and Jimi being disqualified. Kara wins the election, being given the School Council Pack to her chagrin. Jana asks Maddy, alpha of her own pack, what she intends to do about Shannon's laptop and files, and Maddy says they're going to trust Shannon and leave her alone. Jana, clearly unhappy with this, reluctantly agrees.
21	8	"Desperate Measures"	Roger Simonsz	Debbie Moon	1 October 2013	0.326
Jana, still convinced that Shannon's data is a threat, breaks into her locker in an attempt to find her laptop. Maddy and Rhydian again tell her to leave Shannon alone, but she insists they're in danger if they leave that data floating around. They slowly come around to her side of things, and Tom tips Shannon off. Meanwhile, Jimi sells tickets to an upcoming football-match to his friends who cannot afford them, and they try to find different ways to pay the money back. Shannon finds her laptop is missing and blames Jana, who nearly wolfs out when Shannon tries to steal Jana's backpack. Maddy and Rhydian discover that there are cameras missing from the darkroom and Tom says that Shannon must have done it in retaliation for the missing laptop, but when they confront her she is genuinely clueless about the cameras. The pack argue in the darkroom and realise that neither Jana nor Maddy and Rhydian stole Shannon's laptop, and that Shannon did not steal the cameras. Panicked that someone else has the computer with all the files, the pack set out to find the thief and track the laptop to Liam, theorizing he stole the laptop and cameras thinking that Shannon had evidence of the beast or a werewolf. Soon, they realize it was not Liam but Sam, who wanted to sell the laptop and cameras to pay back Jimi. He apologizes profusely and the pack learn he didn't see anything in the files, but they know they have come far too close for comfort. Maddy and Shannon sit alone in the darkroom while Maddy begs Shannon to delete the files. Shannon, scared of not having evidence and being seen as crazy and delusional again, doesn't want to, but tearfully comes to understand that it's either keep the files, or protect her friends. She deletes the files and wonders what she will do with herself now that she doesn't hunt for the beast anymore. Maddy encourages her to try and re-invent herself and to find something new that makes her happy, and goes to lunch.
22	9	"Dances with Wolfbloods"	Jermain Julien	James Whitehouse & Hannah George	7 October 2013	0.316
It's a dark-moon day and a school disco, and Maddy attempts to cheer Shannon up after she deleted all her evidence. Shannon is asked to the disco by Harry Averwood, but after the K's find Jana asleep in the bathroom, they talk loudly enough to deceive her into believing that Harry will cheat on Shannon. She warns Maddy and Rhydian, but Shannon reacts harshly to Maddy's own warning, resulting in their friendship hanging on by a very thin thread. The K's trickery continues at the disco when they plant Katrina's phone on Harry to pretend Katrina and Harry have spent time together. Maddy and Rhydian, though exhausted, are determined to show up for Shannon and the two girls reconcile. Tom, DJ-ing, records the K's conversation about their deception. He plays it over the loudspeakers and exposes them, and Harry and Shannon make up and share their first kiss.
23	10	"Fall of the Wild"	Matthew Evans	James Whitehouse & Hannah George	8 October 2013	0.369
The class is on an orienteering trip, and Liam, believing that his ancestor may have found a werewolf den, is determined to find it again. Maddy tries to stop Liam from discovering the den by pretending to be interested in it so she can lead him away, and Rhydian reluctantly joins. They stumble upon the den anyhow when Liam falls into it and injures his leg and Rhydian runs off to get help. Trying to help him, Maddy transforms and follows a tunnel into the den, though Liam catches a glimpse of her in wolf form before she changes back and is suspicious when Maddy says she didn't see anything. Rhydian and Jana, who until now has been struggling to keep her lost teammates on track, race to find the two. They work together to pull them out of the collapsing den, but their worries are far from over as Liam keeps his eye on Maddy.
24	11	"Best of Both Worlds"	Matthew Evans	Debbie Moon	14 October 2013	N/A
Rhydian's mother Ceri returns, claiming Alric has been exiled by the pack after losing his mind, and that Jana is the new leader. But with parents' evening on the way and Jana determined to bring change to the wild pack, Jana needs a parent and wants Ceri to do the job. They clean Ceri up and try to teach her control, though she nearly loses it in the school. Jana tearfully confesses to Maddy that she was sent to Stoneybridge as a trick, but Maddy tells her that she has to be her strongest self to keep Ceri on her side; if Ceri doesn't support Jana, she will take control of the pack. Ceri also tries to convince Rhydian to join them and be "the alpha male to Jana's female," but he hesitates, telling Maddy that there are things in the human world which he never wants to lose. The pack worry that if Rhydian won't join them, Ceri will take control of the wild pack anyhow and leave Jana behind. However, Jana manages to calm Ceri down and give the K's a pep-talk, encouraging them to work together on their weaknesses and to prove the teachers wrong about them. Impressed by Jana's level-headedness and natural leadership, Ceri genuinely comes to support Jana as leader. She meets Rhydian's foster-mother and sees how happy he is with Maddy, and decides that he was never really wild and should stay in the human world if he is happy there. In the end, Jana leaves with Ceri for the wild pack and vows to blend human and wolfblood culture in a way beneficial for both. They all swear to keep in touch, sending the two away with a few mementos of the human world.
25	12	"Going Underground"	Matthew Evans	Debbie Moon	15 October 2013	0.301
It's the full moon and Alric, having lost everything, returns to get revenge on Rhydian, and he and Maddy lie in danger. They trick him into using eolas near pylons and incapacitate him, fleeing to the school. Alric follows them there and they run into the woods again, with Alric attacking Mr. Jeffries as he tries to stop him. He catches Maddy and threatens her life, but she accuses him of abandoning his daughter while Rhydian only protected her, and Alric collapses in grief. Pitying him, Rhydian finds him in Jana's old caravan later and tells him that it is not too late to change, and that he can make his way as a lone wolf until the right pack finds him, as Rhydian did. With a newfound respect for Rhydian, Alric vows to be a lone wolf and become a better man and takes off. Meanwhile Liam, still suspicious of Maddy, goes back to the underground den with Jimi and Sam. They crawl through the tunnels, recording with their phones, unknowingly stopping just outside Maddy's cellar as she, Rhydian, and her parents transform. They knock a brick out of place and film as Maddy jumps at them in wolf form.
26	13	"The Discovery"	Matthew Evans	Debbie Moon	21 October 2013	0.342
The Smiths are certain their secret is out as Maddy, Rhydian, Tom, and Shannon try to figure out what to do. Liam shows the video around the school and a rumor about Maddy's lycanthropy spreads. Rhydian attacks Liam with Shannon's and Tom's help, with them and several others receiving detention that night. Maddy formulates a plan and asks for her parents' help, while Liam sneaks back into their den and steals a dog-chew previously gifted to the Smiths by Tom as a joke. In the school, Maddy brings in Emma and Daniel in wolf form as a school presentation and says they are her family's pet timber-wolves, domesticated and kept hidden to protect them from poachers or werewolf enthusiasts. The school begins mocking Liam for his werewolf theory and Shannon, having been in this exact situation before, comforts him, saying it was impressive that he stuck to his guns despite the skepticism. Relieved, Rhydian takes Maddy's hand in his own and calls her a genius, asking her if she wants to go somewhere special and do something later. She asks if he's asking her on a date, and he says that he is. She happily accepts, and the K's chant that Rhydian has a girlfriend. In detention, Liam laments that Whitewood will think he's stupid, too, after she tests the dog-chew he gave her. Rhydian bolts from the room and goes to Whitewood's lab, stealing the dog-chew back. Unbeknownst to him, she has already tested the DNA and has seen that Daniel Smith is nearly 50% human, 50% wolf. She goes to the Smiths to tell them that she will keep their secret, but only if they agree to join her at her lab and allow her to conduct tests on them, essentially becoming lab-rats. They refuse, and she leaves to give them some time to reconsider. They decide to flee, but they don't know where to go where Whitewood won't be able to find them. Maddy suggests they go to Jana's wild pack until it's safe, and her parents reluctantly agree. Rhydian, Shannon, and Tom meet with the Smiths, where Maddy asks Rhydian to leave with them. He says that he can't, a minor in the foster-care system going missing would just draw too much attention to the Smiths. Maddy reiterates that no matter where they are, no matter how far away, they will always be a pack. The pack tearfully say their goodbyes, with Maddy and Rhydian sharing their first kiss and admitting that they love each other. The Smiths leave and take wolf form, and Shannon, Tom, and Rhydian howl after them as they run off into the wild. Note: Final appearance of Maddy Smith (Aimee Kelly).

=== Series 3 (2014) ===
No. overall	No. in series	Title	Directed by	Written by	Original release date	UK viewers (millions)
27	1	"Ulterior Motives"	Matthew Evans	Debbie Moon	15 September 2014	0.477
Two months after the Smiths left for the wild, Rhydian howls mournfully on the moors the night before a full moon. Shannon and Tom, cleaning the Smiths' home of any remaining DNA, hear him and worry about him. They turn and catch a glimpse of an eye looking at them through the window. The next day at school, Katrina excitedly announces the grand opening of the "Kafe"—pronounced rhyming with "safe"—a spot taking over Bernie's old residence. Shannon and Harry are set to perform together at the Kafe, and while Tom is supportive Rhydian remains unenthusiastic. They warn him to be careful on the moors, noting that they may have seen Whitewood the night before, but he shrugs them off. It is also the day of a school career fair, and as it begins Rhydian catches the scent of another wolfblood. He follows the scent and meets Dacia, a representative of Segolia, a company composed of wolfbloods and their allies along with many ignorant humans. She tells him that Maddy says hi, and that she and her parents were intercepted on the way to the wild pack and are instead going to Canada with Segolia's help; they will be set up with new identities and will be in touch as soon as it is safe. She offers him a job with Segolia but he declines. Shannon, however, is ecstatic and makes a fool of herself in front of Dacia, who sees Tom and Shannon as irresponsible when compared to Rhydian. He asks her to give them a chance as Kara also lands a job offer with Segolia. Outside the school, Whitewood returns and watches the students from the field; since her obsessive chase of the Smiths with no proof to back up her claims, she has lost her job and reputation. Shannon asks her to leave and she insists she will figure out Maddy and co's secret. Mr. Jeffries, having known her since their university days, takes her to his office and doubts her werewolf theory, angering her, and she leaves. At the Kafe, Shannon performs with Harry as Tom watches and Whitewood unexpectedly arrives and begins to question Liam, Sam, and Jimi about Rhydian. Liam, seeming to find her unstable, refuses to answer but Jimi readily gives Rhydian's address. Whitewood leaves and Shannon and Tom hurry after her, upsetting Harry. Whitewood finds Rhydian and sedates him, locking him in a cage in the back of her car, saying she will take him to the Kafe so everyone can see what he truly is and she will not be "crazy" any longer. He calls Dacia as Shannon and Tom rush to save him, but it's Dacia who stops Whitewood's car in wolf form. Shannon and Tom arrive in time to see Whitewood staring at Rhydian and Dacia as wolves before they run off. They ask Whitewood what happened, but she remains in shock before answering that Dacia has made her an offer she could not refuse; a job with Segolia and the answers to all her wolfblood questions. She swears she will leave the pack alone, and Shannon and Tom excitedly shout after Rhydian that this means Maddy can come home. In the woods, Rhydian leaps into the air with a howl.
28	2	"Alpha Material"	Matthew Evans	Debbie Moon	16 September 2014	0.408
Rhydian, Shannon, and Tom eagerly await Dacia's arrival with Maddy, Emma, and Daniel, but she returns in her car alone. She explains that the Smiths are already on a ship to Canada and cannot be turned around; their new lives have already begun. Rhydian, devastated, says he will go to Canada to find Maddy anyhow. Shannon and Tom try to stop him but he lashes out, saying they aren't wolfbloods and he wants Maddy back. Hurt, they leave him to go to Canada. He returns to his foster family, the Vaughans, and packs a bag to take on the trip. He says goodbye to his foster brothers Ollie and Joe as well as his foster mother, who seems concerned about him since Maddy "moved away." He shrugs her off and leaves. He is stopped in the woods by the arrival of Aran and Meinir, the beta wolves from Jana's wild pack, and is led to her. She has been shot leading hunters away from the pack and will die if the bullet is not removed and the wound treated. They have come to see if the Smiths can help, but while Meinir and Aran are angry they have brought their alpha all this way for nothing, Jana is sure Rhydian can still help them. They bring her back to the Smiths' home and call Shannon and Tom while Rhydian has a bittersweet reunion with Ceri. Shannon and Tom arrive and Tom wants to call his doctor mother, though the wolfbloods forbid any humans from learning about this. Eventually, Rhydian decides he has to call someone to help and brings a vet to the house. Jana, in wolf form, lays on a table while Ceri whispers to her to keep her from transforming back. Talking the vet out of euthanizing Jana, Ceri keeps reason while the vet operates and removes the bullet. Jana awakens later, already strengthened, and decides to stay in the human world until she is healed. They send Meinir back to the wild pack, nervous she may try and take control with Jana gone, and Jana reconnects with her Stoneybridge friends while Rhydian decides to stay in Stoneybridge as well; he says that Shannon and Tom are his pack, and they need him, too.
29	3	"With Friends like These"	Matthew Evans	Sophie Petzal	22 September 2014	0.324
Tom walks through a field at night, startled when he comes across Aran and Rhydian hiding from a farmer. The farmer gives chase and they flee with stolen meat. They return to the Smith house and give the meat to Jana, while Tom scolds them for poaching. Aran defends it by saying Jana needs good raw meat to heal, but Jana says they will get by on what they find in the woods from now on. At school, Liam returns Tom's lost planner and reveals it was found in Liam's field the night before after Tom dropped it. He accuses Tom of poaching before Shannon, who broke up with Harry shortly after Jana's return, steps in and says he wasn't poaching but was instead on a walk with her. She reluctantly claims that she and Tom are dating, and they begin to act more "couply" to avoid Liam's suspicions. However, their classmates assume Shannon was cheating on Harry with Tom and she tries desperately to deny this. Harry confronts her about it and when she is about to confess to the lie, Liam follows them and nearly records the conversation. Rhydian warns her in time and she heartbrokenly allows Harry to assume she cheated on him. Meanwhile, Jana tries to show Aran the benefits of the human world despite his aversion. He accuses her of staying weakened on purpose to avoid her duties in the wild but she overpowers him, demanding that she stay in the human world until she is better. She encourages him to leave if he is so afraid and he does, but Ceri tells her that Jana isn't sure of her own desires and must prove to Aran that she will not betray the pack. Jana asks her to go after him, but Ceri is caught in a trap set by Liam's father on their field. Aran returns to free her and Liam follows them to the Smith house, where Jana lies that Aran is her mother's partner and that they were only stealing to feed her while she is recovering from a raid of their travelers' camp. He is uncaring and threatens to turn them in but Rhydian stops him by threatening to post a compromising video of Liam he got while Liam was spying on Shannon, and Liam leaves. Tom comforts Shannon about the fight with Harry and they decide to throw one last charade as a couple. During lunch, Tom sits with Rhydian as Shannon bursts in and dramatically accuses him of missing a date the previous night, breaking up with him and storming out. The school laughs at Tom's expense, with Rhydian joining in.
30	4	"Wolfblood Is Thicker than Water"	Matthew Evans	James Whitehouse & Hannah George	23 September 2014	N/A
Rhydian and Tom hang out outside before Rhydian catches the scent of another wolfblood and gives chase, tracking down a wolfblood who smells just like him. Stunned, he realises this wolfblood is his father Gerwyn. He takes Gerwyn back to the Smith house where Ceri has a violent reaction to his presence. She shuns him and laments that, just like Gerwyn, Bryn has abandoned Ceri for places unknown; Gerwyn was unaware of Ceri's second pregnancy and is devastated to learn he'd abandoned two sons. He says he wants Ceri and Rhydian back in his life but Ceri insists he has ulterior motives. Dacia visits to check on Jana and spots Gerwyn, seeming to know him from somewhere. She becomes curious about wolfblood medicine and asks for Jana and Ceri to share recipes, but when they refuse she steals some from Ceri's bag. They catch her and threaten her until Rhydian gets between them. He asks Dacia to leave and she stops on the way out, greeting Gerwyn and revealing that he is on the run for embezzling millions of pounds from Segolia. She says this is why she was sent to Bradlington High in the first place, to see if Rhydian had been in contact with Gerwyn. Gerwyn insists this is a lie and explains that he was only an accountant for Segolia who noticed the missing money and corrupt accounts before being framed for the theft. Rhydian and Ceri come to believe him, and Dacia sheepishly admits that she's already called Segolia's head of security Victoria Sweeney. Aran and Gerwyn switch clothes and Aran leads the Segolia wolfbloods away when they arrive and give chase, with Aran gleeful to return to the wild, and Rhydian excitedly plans to have Gerwyn stay. Gerwyn sadly tells Rhydian he can't stay, he has to leave before Segolia targets him and Ceri any further, and they unhappily say their goodbyes. Ceri grants Gerwyn enouwian, an ancient wild wolfblood ritual of forgiveness, and he flees as Dacia tells Shannon and Tom that she needs enouwian, too.
31	5	"The Dark Ages"	Matthew Evans	Debbie Moon	29 September 2014	0.244
When some ancient wolfblood artefacts are found in the Kafe's attic, sparks fly as Shannon believes they should go to a museum, Jana, Ceri, and Rhydian believe they belong to the wild pack, and Jimi, Sam, Liam, and the K's want to sell them for profit. After a fight, the K's ditch Kay and Tom comforts her, beginning a flirtatious relationship. Shannon realises that Jana and Ceri are the only ones who will treat the artefacts with the respect they deserve and helps them chase the K's and Jimi away from them. They find a pendant that tells the tale of a war fought by humans and wolfbloods side by side as one pack, and Ceri says Jana should wear it on their return to the wild pack that night. Before they can leave, however, Aran comes back saying that the pack has left the territory and Meinir has taken over. Aran leaves again to find them, but Jana has no hope left and gives the pendant and artefacts to Shannon after all, telling Aran and Ceri that she is no longer their alpha.
32	6	"Who's Afraid of the Big Bad Wolf?"	Jermain Julien	Catrin Clarke	30 September 2014	0.260
Jana struggles to deal with the fact that her pack has betrayed her, and it results in the Morwal, a vicious and werewolf-like part that develops in a wolfblood who is in pain. Jana comes back to school on the full moon and causes trouble on her first day, fighting with Rhydian and becoming leader of the K's. She fights with Kay when Kay becomes convinced that Tom fancies Jana, and Jana flees after dumping food on her. Rhydian chases after her and comforts her, and she asks him to lock her in the den that night. However, the K's and Jimi lure her down to the cafeteria stock room and lock her inside, triggering her into transforming. Rhydian also transforms as the moon rises and it's up to Tom and Shannon to help. Kay demands to know why Tom is so protective of Jana and he breaks up with her to protect the secret, infuriating the K's and sending them and Jimi from the school. Tom and Shannon go into the stock room to find Jana and are cornered by her before managing to calm her down, falling asleep where Rhydian and Ceri find them the next morning.
33	7	"Wolves Amongst Us"	Jermain Julien	Sophie Petzal	6 October 2014	0.298
To help cheer Jana up, Rhydian takes her on a trip to mark an old wolfblood den suggested by Ceri. Unfortunately, it means they bunk off work experience. Tom works in the Kafe alongside Kay and Katrina, and Kara does work experience for Segolia. Shannon goes behind Rhydian's back and also undergoes work at Segolia despite their framing of his father. Ollie, Rhydian's foster brother, follows Jana and Rhydian, and Jana involuntarily connects to the den through ansion and sees that an entire pack was hunted and killed there on a full moon. She flees and runs into Ollie, who sees her yellow eyes, though she explains that she can see into the past and that that causes the yellow eyes; he agrees to keep her secret and helps her and Rhydian mark the den so the pack that died there can be remembered. Back at the Kafe, Rhydian discovers Shannon's betrayal and they fall out while Dacia brings him a file revealing that his father was a fraud after all, working for a mysterious group named Cerberus.
34	8	"Dark of the Rune"	Jermain Julien	James Whitehouse & Hannah George	7 October 2014	0.327
With Rhydian and Shannon still at odds, a meteor shower falls on a dark moon, which Ceri warns will bring something bad. Whitewood delivers a telescope to the school so the students can watch the meteors, and Rhydian reacts angrily to her presence, reminding the others that Whitewood chased Maddy and her parents away and locked Rhydian in the back of her car. Shannon works with her regardless, Tom thinks Rhydian is taking it all a bit personally, and Jana just wants them all to get along again. Jana and Tom try to end the feud, but during the night she and Rhydian grow delirious and collapse, revealing a connection to a group of people that collapsed the last time the meteor shower occurred on a dark moon—wolfbloods who never awoke. Shannon, Tom, and Dr. Whitewood work together to wake them all up with a certain frequency, and Shannon tearfully apologizes to Rhydian for "everything." The wolfbloods awaken and Rhydian and Shannon finally make up, and the pack is restored to normal.
35	9	"The Cure"	Jermain Julien	Paul Mousley	13 October 2014	0.343
Tom, Shannon and Jana head to Segolia for more work experience. Victoria Sweeney takes an interest in Jana's wild wolfblood abilities, and Jana uses ansion on a tooth of Sweeney's grandmother's to see that Sweeney was the runt of her pack abandoned in a fire. Sweeney, amazed, tells Jana that she will always have a place with Segolia. Shannon secretly brings a piece of pizza with Jana's DNA to help Segolia employee Alexander Kincaid and Dr Whitewood to perfect a serum that heals Kincaid's limp, and Tom sees that Sweeney is holding someone hostage and finds a strange device. The pack discuss what Tom saw, and Tom later accidentally fires a serum at himself while messing around with the device. It's soon revealed to have given him wolfblood abilities, such as heightened speed, agility, and hearing. He starts to let his new found powers take over his self-control, and ends up dragging himself away from his pack and into the wrong crowd, rekindling his relationship with Kay in the process.
36	10	"The Cult of Tom"	Sallie Aprahamian	Neil Jones	14 October 2014	0.273
Tom lets his powers turn him into a typical bad-boy but seems to be losing control of the wolf. The rest of the pack ask for help from Dacia and then Kincaid after she proves mostly unhelpful. Tom begins having strange dizzy spells and loses his control of the wolf in the Kafe before running away and collapsing, with Mr. Jefferies seeing his eyes change yellow. Kincaid arrives and tries to use another serum on Tom to cure him but it doesn't work, only seeming to agitate him more, and Ceri uses wolfblood healing to turn him human again. Shannon tearfully confesses how much Tom means to her while he is still unconscious, kissing his forehead. He awakens and makes an awkward joke, and the pack celebrate his recovery. Still, he and Shannon talk later, but stop just short of kissing.
37	11	"The Suspicions of Mr Jeffries"	Sallie Aprahamian	Debbie Moon	20 October 2014	0.358
Mr. Jeffries becomes curious after he saw Tom's eyes change. The pack plan to say Tom suffers from hypoglycemia and had a bad reaction to yellow joke contacts. They're still planning this when Ceri is cornered at the Smith house by Victoria Sweeney and several Segolia wolfbloods. The pack rush in to protect her and Mr. Jeffries sees them all wolfing out, riding his bike into the woods and eventually being caught by the Segolia wolfbloods. Rhydian fights them off in wolf form and then transforms back in front of a very shocked Mr. Jeffries, who grows fearful of the wolfbloods and worries they could transform and hurt students in the school. They swear they are not a threat and beg him to keep the secret, but it's ultimately Whitewood who convinces him. He gives Tom's hypoglycemia as the official answer for his unstable behaviors, and Tom and Kay, once again, make up after the previous events at the Kafe.
38	12	"Cerberus"	Sallie Aprahamian	Lee Walters	21 October 2014	0.377
Gerwyn arrives in Stoneybridge, where Rhydian explains that Alex Kincaid can keep them safe from Sweeney and the rest of Segolia, who they believe are behind Cerberus. Shannon, Tom, and Mr. Jeffries plan to stop Sweeney but are caught by Liam, whom Mr. Jeffries reluctantly shares the secret with. He joins them and they catch Sweeney just as Kincaid drives away with the pack. This is where Sweeney reveals that in fact, Kincaid is behind Cerberus and the corrupt accounts and that he is the enemy of the wolfbloods. The van arrives at Kincaid's mansion, the pack delirious after eating drugged meat.
39	13	"Moonrise"	Sallie Aprahamian	Debbie Moon	27 October 2014	0.271
The pack wake up in a cell, where they discover that the wild pack had not abandoned Jana but had instead been abducted by Kincaid, and that Meinir has been scientifically turned human. Kincaid confirms that it was him who was responsible for the corrupt accounts, as he stole the money to perfect his serums capable of altering wolfblood DNA. He's already given all of them a serum designed to kill their wolf cells, and when the full moon rises that night they will all be permanently human. The wolfbloods, however, manage to find some of the serum that gave Tom wolfblood symptoms and distribute it amongst themselves, foiling Kincaid's scheme. Rhydian corners Kincaid and attempts to reason with him, but he is unmoved, telling Rhydian that he was adopted by a wolfblood couple with an unruly wolfblood son; they'd hoped Kincaid could calm the boy down. Instead Kincaid was mercilessly tormented, and sees all wolfbloods as monsters because of it. He mocks Rhydian, saying the moon has risen and he is still human, but Jana bursts in at the last minute to give Rhydian the serum. He and Jana corner Kincaid, and he is chased out a window and up a tree by a whole pack of wolves; Meinir, still human, watches from a distance. Five weeks later, Rhydian "discovers an ancestry" in Canada, and decides to live in Canada and find Maddy. Jana is unhappy to see him go but accepts his decision, wanting his happiness. She decides to stay in the human world and work with Segolia at Rhydian's encouragement. The pack say their goodbyes, reiterating that they'll always be a pack no matter the distance between them. Tom and Shannon finally kiss, leaving thought as to whether they will become a couple. (Although this kiss is missing from the version shown in the US, Tom does embrace Shannon in an affectionate way.) The season ends with Rhydian walking through the snow of Canada and howling, grinning when he hears an answering howl in the distance. He takes off, and he and Maddy reunite in wolf form. Note: Final appearance of Rhydian Morris, Shannon Kelly, and Tom Okanawe (Bobby Lockwood, Louisa Connolly-Burnham, and Kedar Williams-Sterling).

=== Series 4 (2016) ===
No. overall	No. in series	Title	Directed by	Written by	Original release date	UK viewers (millions)
40	1	"Captivity"	Jermain Julien	Debbie Moon	8 March 2016	0.231
Jana is working for Segolia, under the roof and eye of Imara Cipriani. After finding her reckless son, TJ, they both stumble into the tranquilising of two roaming wolfbloods in wolf form. They follow the wolves and the man who captured them to an animal sanctuary, where TJ recognises the older wolfblood to be classmate Matei Covaci. The younger wolfblood, his sister Emilia, is initially aggressive but is very grateful for Jana's and TJ's help escaping the sanctuary's cages. Later, Imara is heavily disapproving of the Covaci siblings' behavior and scolds Jana and TJ. At school, where Emilia deals with bullying due to the burn scars on her face, Matei asks to speak with Jana about something important. The Covacis come into the Kafe later and give Jana a ring once belonging to their mother, who died in the same house fire that killed their father and scarred Emilia's face; Matei himself narrowly escaped as he rescued Emilia. The siblings want to know if anyone else was involved in the fire and believe that Jana's skill in ansion could help. Jana takes the ring somewhere quieter and uses ansion, reliving the fire and seeing the face of a young boy watching through the window. The Covacis demand to know how this boy is connected to the fire, but Jana doesn't know. The Covacis, Jana, and TJ vow to find out.
41	2	"A Long Way from Home"	Jermain Julien	Debbie Moon	8 March 2016	0.257
Jana looks through Segolia's files on the Covaci fire but finds nothing on the boy she saw through ansion. The only thing she does find is text reading "Action Taken: Protocol Five." She questions Imara, who says protocol five merely orders that any evidence of a person being a wolfblood is removed from a crime scene, legally or illegally. Jana accepts this, and Imara helps with a composite sketch of the boy she saw. When TJ recognises the boy as an expelled classmate, Darren, he goes to his friend/crush Selina Khan to ask for Darren's address. Selina, who dislikes Darren, veins up as she hits a punching bag and gives him the address to "get rid" of TJ. TJ, Jana, and the Covacis go to Darren's house the day of the full moon, where Emilia briefly wolfs out, and Jana alone is invited inside. She meets Darren's disabled mother and hears stories about the times Darren's friends have taken advantage of him, and considers that he might not have had anything to do with the Covaci fire. However, as she leaves, she overhears a conversation where he admits to his friend that he was at the Covaci home that day. They follow Darren as he goes to meet his friend but wolf out as the moon rises; all except for TJ, who has yet to transform for the first time. He confronts Darren and his two friends, but they nearly jump him before Jana, Emilia, and Matei swarm the group as wolves. Darren heartbrokenly confesses that he and his friends were robbing one of the homes down the street from the Covacis', and he'd run to the Covaci home to try and get in when he saw the flames and heard dogs howling inside. He repeats that he just wanted to save the dogs, and TJ realises Darren truly is harmless. He sends Darren's friends away and threatens them not to go near Darren again, urging Darren to do better and be better for his mother's sake. The next day, Emilia and TJ chase each other as Jana has a heart-to-heart with Matei, using ansion on his mother's ring again and assuring him that his mother loved him and he'll always be connected to her. Imara ambushes Emilia and TJ and follows them back to Jana and Matei, angry that their antics have wound up on the news. She says she has found relatives of Matei's and Emilia's in Romania, where they will be sent immediately. Having never been to Romania, the Covacis refuse to go and Jana tells them to run, stopping Imara from going after them. Imara responds by kicking Jana out of her home and leaves with TJ. Jana, homeless and jobless, goes to the Kafe and talks to Katrina about her failed bonding with her new flatmate. They reminisce about Bradlington High, and Katrina offers Jana a job and room in the Kafe. Touched and surprised by her friendship with Katrina, Jana accepts.
42	3	"Wolfblood Ultimatum"	Jermain Julien	Sophie Petzal	15 March 2016	N/A
Jana attempts to sneak away from TJ to visit the Covacis' hiding place. He realises where she's going, however, and follows her for a bit before losing her trail; he is unknowingly followed by a Segolia agent. Jana meets with Matei and Emilia and sadly tells them that they can't return to the city. She instead offers to take them to Gerwyn and Ceri, who still reside in Stoneybridge. The Covacis don't want to leave the city, but reluctantly agree to meet at first light to leave for Stoneybridge. During the night, Katrina and Jana are awoken by the sound of an intruder. Jana goes to confront the burglar and comes across Aran, stealing raw meat for a seriously ill Meinir. Jana takes Meinir up to her room and lays her down, calling Dr. Whitewood, who reveals that Meinir has developed pneumonia in the wild; since Kincaid's serum destroyed her wolfblood cells, her immune system is weaker. Whitewood hesitates to help, and asks Jana to meet with Imara first. Imara sympathises with Jana and Meinir's sickness, offering to help them in full, but only if Jana will reveal the Covacis' location. She feigns ignorance, but soon breaks down and hurries off to find the Covacis and explain Imara's ultimatum. Emilia, at the Kafe with Matei, bonds with Meinir, who tells her that her burn scars are a sign of strength and would mark her as a "cerddwr tân"—a "firewalker"—in the wild. Enamored with the pack dynamics and cultural differences, the Covacis decide to leave for the wild with Meinir and Aran once Meinir has healed. TJ learns Imara had Segolia follow him and, disgusted by her ultimatum with Jana, storms out to find his friends. Jana arrives and frets to Aran about Imara's demands, where he reveals that Meinir is to stay in the human world now that she is effectively human, and that Segolia will be an important ally to keep in the future. Matei and Emilia overhear her conversation with Aran and plan to leave, but TJ stops them, insisting that Imara just wants to prove her power over Jana and TJ. Emilia refuses to let Meinir die for her or Matei, but Meinir says that if anyone must make the choice, it will be her. She plans to die for the Covacis, but Jana runs to challenge Imara and TJ and the Covacis join her. After a tense stand-off, Imara transforms and lunges at Jana. TJ leaps in the way, taking Imara's bite to the forearm and bleeding heavily. He insists that if Imara sends Matei and Emilia away, he'll leave as well. She gives in and allows Meinir to receive treatment with Segolia as Matei and Emilia return to their foster family in the city. Jana joins TJ as he goes to make amends with Imara, and tells Imara that they're on the same side. She vows to keep Matei and Emilia in check, and Imara thanks her, leaving her to keep her room in the Kafe.
43	4	"Morwal"	Jermain Julien	Sophie Petzal	16 March 2016	N/A
As Jana tries to stay on Imara's good side, she agrees to help Segolia when a dangerous wolfblood enters the territory. She uses eolas to track the aggressive wolfblood girl but grows frustrated when Imara hesitates to let her have much more of a role than sniffer dog. Meanwhile, Meinir is given an experimental form of Kincaid's serum, which makes Meinir and Aran suspicious, but the siblings try to trust Segolia. When the treatment seems to fail, and devastated that she is to remain in the human world, Meinir runs off into the city and Aran follows her. After he is overwhelmed, Meinir keeps her head due to her dulled senses and consoles him, tearfully accepting that her wolf is gone. She fears that living in the human world will kill any remaining wolfblood part of her, and works to convince Aran to take her back to the wild. Jana goes to find the pair and is attacked by the dangerous wolfblood. This wolfblood girl, Carrie, steals Jana's phone to call TJ and ask him to take her to Alexander Kincaid. Jana confronts her but decides to take her to TJ, sending the Covacis to find Meinir and Aran. She learns that Carrie used to go to school with TJ and heard him tell stories about Kincaid and his anti-wolfblood serums. Carrie, never having known about wolfbloods until she began transforming and her parents finally told her her true nature, wants to use Kincaid's serum to become human again. Jana realises Carrie has the morwal and tries to have a heart to heart, but is interrupted when Matei, Emilia, Meinir, and Aran run in; they've only just talked their way out of Meinir being arrested for shoplifting. Carrie, seeming particularly upset by the presence of the Covacis, lashes out and frightens Meinir before running off, causing Meinir to once again realise the depth of her humanity. As she cries in despair, she suddenly begins to vein up as her eyes turn yellow. Her wolf has miraculously returned, and she celebrates with the rest of the wolfbloods. Later, Jana sends Meinir and Aran back to the wild and laments that she couldn't help Carrie at the Kafe. To her and TJ's horror, Carrie bursts into the Kafe in wolf form and corners the pair. Katrina runs back into the Kafe and sets off a fire extinguisher to scare the wolf off, unexpectedly saving the day. As Carrie runs outside, she is tranquilized by Segolia agents and taken somewhere unknown.
44	5	"The Quiet Hero"	Sarah Walker	Furquan Akhtar	22 March 2016	N/A
TJ notices Selina veining up during a sparring match with her rival Hannah, but she swears he's making it up and shuns him. He tries to talk to Imara about it but she worries him with her response and he shuts down. He goes to Jana instead and she suggests it's stress wearing Selina's control down. They go to talk with her while she teaches Taekwondo to Emilia. She insists she never veined up, but does so in front of them and the Covacis when their questions overwhelm her. Jana goes to speak with Selina and learns that Selina's parents don't know she still practices Taekwondo; they'd asked her to quit after her first transformation to prevent her from losing control. This lie has been steadily worsening Selina's control, but she refuses to come clean to them. Instead, she agrees to learn some control from Jana using Maddy's techniques from her first days in Stoneybridge. The techniques fail, and the pack plans to go to the Khans. Selina, however, stops TJ short of revealing anything and sends him away. He leaves Jana to believe the situation is resolved. After another spat with Hannah, Selina wolfs out and runs off and TJ goes to comfort her, assuring her that he and the others will always support her and encouraging her to tell her parents the truth. Instead, she drops out of the upcoming taekwondo tournament and leaves. TJ tells Jana the situation has actually gotten worse and goes to see Selina, with the two going to the tunnels where the Covacis used to hide. He shows Selina an area of the tunnels where Selina can train without stress, but she sadly rejects the offer, expressing gratitude but still stepping away when TJ leans in to kiss her. Above ground, she tells him about how she and her father used to train together before her first transformation. He in turn admits he hasn't transformed yet at all, but they are interrupted by a nearby mugging. Selina chases down and stops the mugger while her hijab covers her face and TJ records. He jokes about uploading the video and Selina going viral as a superhero, and the situation deepens the bond between the pair.
45	6	"She-Wolf"	Sarah Walker	Furquan Akhtar	23 March 2016	0.199
In the tunnels, TJ and Selina watch a video narrated by a man amazed by Selina's lithe fighting skills shown in the videos TJ has uploaded of her. The vlogger compares her to a cat, or wolf, calling her a "she-wolf." TJ remarks that Selina may have just become famous, though he worries Segolia may notice the videos. At home, Imara proves his fears by showing him a video and questioning him on whether he recognizes this "she-wolf." He denies this and deletes his video. At the Kafe, Jana impresses Mr. Mackenzie with lightning-fast reflexes, and suggests a more efficient way of arranging the Kafe's furniture. Mr. Mackenzie, Katrina's father, wonders why Katrina hadn't thought of it first; Katrina argues that she actually had, but her father doubts this. Jana later overhears Mr. Mackenzie telling Katrina that Jana is invaluable. TJ tries to speak with Jana about the video, but she tells him to wait for the end of her shift, so he leaves. At school, Selina shows him a message from a little girl whose dog has been abducted, pleading for the she-wolf's help to get her dog back. TJ is reluctant, especially because the next day is a dark moon, but Selina is determined. He warns her that they're already pushing their luck, but Selina says she's helping the girl no matter what. Meanwhile, Emilia complains about Matei's overbearing presence in her life. This worsens when Matei intervenes in a fight between Emilia and Hannah, and Emilia snaps that she can take care of herself before storming off. TJ continues trying to speak with Jana, but she is busy with her shift, as well as a bit of tension between her and Katrina as the latter grows jealous of her. Selina goes to meet with the dognapper, finding TJ at the location as unexpected backup; TJ says that they are a team. They nearly kiss before Selina picks up a new scent and follows it to find the dognapper. They find the dog unharmed, but are cornered by the dognapper with a camera as he snaps photos of the pair. Selina gives chase, wolfing out and tackling the man to the ground; he is revealed to be the vlogger from earlier. He quickly gives the camera to TJ and Selina, who both assure the man they won't hurt him. He readily agrees to delete his site and videos on Selina, and TJ and Selina flee. Selina is regretful seeing how close she came to hurting an innocent man, while also nearly exposing the secret, and hurries off. The next day on the dark moon, Emilia has another fight with Hannah, but Matei chooses to leave her to deal with the aftermath alone. TJ shows Selina that the vlogger's site really has been deleted, but Selina laments that she never meant to harm anyone or scare them into giving up what they're passionate about. Jana, ill from the moon, is clumsy at work and Katrina accuses her of faking sick out of spite. Katrina sends her out, and Jana angrily goes. That night, Emilia weeps at the grave of the Covaci parents' tomb. Matei appears and reminisces on Emilia calling no-moon days "baboon days" when they were young, and how their parents made up a story about baboons stealing the moon. Matei says he misses their parents, and Emilia says she sometimes wishes Matei hadn't saved her from the fire. Matei begs her never to say that, and the two reconcile. TJ tells Katrina that Jana must really be ill, reminding Katrina that Jana has been giving her all to the Kafe, and goes upstairs to see her. He encourages Jana to stay positive, and she apologizes for neglecting him in favor of the Kafe, finally allowing him to tell her what's been going on. Jana reiterates that Selina's stress comes from lying to her parents, saying it must be intense guilt. At home, Selina confesses her lies to her mother and father. The next morning, Mrs. Khan assures Selina that the only thing they want is Selina's happiness, and Mr. Khan surprises her with a dojo in the house to practice her Tae kwon do; her mother asks her not to hit too hard as she and her father practice together. At the Kafe, Katrina surprises Jana with breakfast in bed and confesses that TJ was right, and that Jana is an amazing employee. She confesses her fear that her father thinks she is incapable of running the Kafe herself, but Jana assures her she understands the pressure of living up to a father's expectations and they make up. At school, Selina ecstatically tells TJ that she can continue Tae kwon do, and Hannah attempts to fight Emilia again. Selina steps in and challenges Hannah to a match after school. Katrina and Jana work a successful shift together, and Mr. Mackenzie is impressed with their teamwork. Jana gets permission to leave early to see the match, and Matei remarks how odd it is to see Jana outside of the Kafe these days. The pack hope that, having cleared her conscience, Selina can keep from losing control during the match. The girls fight, with Hannah attempting a sneak attack before Selina flips against a wall and overpowers her; she helps Hannah to her feet and Hannah hands her the trophy from an earlier match that Hannah won, though Selina rejects the trophy and goes to celebrate with her pack.
46	7	"Sheep's Clothing"	Sarah Walker	Neil Jones	29 March 2016	N/A
In the tunnels, Selina worries that things will be awkward in the pack; she announces that they ought to make someone alpha officially, but she doesn't want to upset TJ. TJ wonders why he would be upset, but when Jana arrives Selina, Matei, and Emilia turn to her and kneel, transforming into wolves; Jana happily accepts this and transforms in turn. TJ, still in human form, watches in dismay as his friends transform around him. At the Kafe, TJ notices a girl wearing a pair of vintage high-tops and begins flirting with her, claiming his name stands for "True Jentleman" and wondering if the girl can get him high-tops as well. She writes her name—Niamh—and phone number on his forehead, doing "anything to keep him quiet." When he is giddy that he's gotten her number, the pack confusedly remind him that he should want to be with a wolfblood; Niamh is human. Emilia worries that Imara wouldn't like it, but TJ argues his mother is not the boss of him, only to immediately answer when Imara calls his cell phone. The pack laugh at him, and Jana shares a look with Matei. Later, TJ laments that he might as well be with a human seeing as he "isn't really a wolfblood," thinking wolfblood girls would have no interest in a boy who hasn't transformed yet. Jana warns him that plenty of wolfbloods would be against a human-wolfblood union, but that TJ should just call Niamh if he wants to. At the Ciprianis' home, Imara asks Jana if she knows what deja vu is. She reads a blurb from the back of a book… "When the wild red-haired girl comes to the village of Rockybridge, no one knows that at full moon she transforms into a wild beast, or of her secret love for handsome young bloodwolf Gideon…" Jana furiously takes the book and tracks down its owner, Tim Jeffries. TJ goes on a date with Niamh at a skate park, impressing her with his skating skills and claiming he is self-taught. He admits to looking her up on social media and she confesses to trying the same thing, asking why it was so hard to find any information on him anywhere. He claims his mother is strict with social media usage, and Niamh says she doesn't like secrets, nearly kissing TJ before skating away. After, they go to the Kafe where Matei and Selina treat Niamh coldly, though Emilia seems unbothered, and the three leave. TJ apologizes and says his friends are weird, and Niamh goes to order food. While she's gone, she receives a text from someone warning her to stay away from "him" or she will get hurt. TJ reads the message and deletes it from her phone, wordlessly continuing the date with Niamh when she returns. Meanwhile, Jana catches Jeffries recording a blurb for his book Bloodwolf, confronting him for copying her story down and selling it country-wide. She especially critiques his lack of creativity, substituting Maddy for Kaddy; Rhydian for Gideon; Jana for Yana; Segolia for Sologia; wolfblood for bloodwolf. He redirects her anger by telling her it's very good to see her. He explains that he's happily picking up a career in writing, planning to give a reading of the book the next day. He claims that after everything he's experienced, he should get to write about it, and that no one will take the book as reality. He ignores Jana's request to take the book off sale, inviting her to his reading instead. At the reading, Jeffries surprises her by bringing her on stage and announcing her as a wolfblood, saying she is what Bloodwolf is based on. He then laughs and says it was all a joke, which the audience instantly believes, and he reiterates to Jana that no one would ever take the novel seriously. The last part of his reading is a part dedicated to Jana, of Jeffries' character sending Jana's off into the Sologia building, knowing she would always be true to her wolf. Jana ultimately decides the book is not a threat. TJ offers to walk Niamh home and she nearly kisses him before getting a message that says to run while she still can, but TJ says it could just be a wrong number. She laughs it off, but asks TJ if there's any reason she should run from him. She kisses him, telling him to call her as she leaves. He goes to the tunnels, accusing the pack of messaging Niamh and Selina accuses him of turning on the pack, and he initially laughs it off before Matei's joke about him eating Niamh angers him all over again. When he meets with Niamh, she shows him a new message about TJ having her for lunch, and he returns to the tunnels and punches Matei across the face. They wolf out at each other before TJ storms out. Niamh asks Matei why he's fighting with TJ, surmising that TJ is hiding something from her. TJ confronts Matei again at the Kafe, catching Niamh's scent and accusing Matei of turning Niamh against him and demanding to know what Matei said to her. Matei says he told her TJ is a very cool guy. Meanwhile, Niamh overhears the conversation and says TJ clearly does have a secret, storming out. As he argues with Selina outside the Kafe, they spot graffiti signed by "Carrie" saying she will ruin their lives. Jana sees the graffiti and runs off after TJ, and Jeffries reunites with Katrina. TJ finds Niamh's shoe and backpack, telling Jana that Carrie has been messaging Niamh and must have done something to her as revenge. He runs off to save Niamh as Jana goes to check on Carrie's whereabouts. Jana calls Imara while Niamh calls TJ, saying "she" is watching her and that the girl said she'd rip Niamh apart, chasing her while she dropped her belongings and got on the nearest bus. He follows her scent to an abandoned building, finding her sitting and traumatized. She demands to know why this is happening, and TJ reluctantly explains that a girl named Carrie is targeting Niamh as payback for TJ's unfulfilled promises. He struggles to give her much more context without telling her the secret, but finally breaks down and tells her he is a wolfblood. She backs out of the room and locks him inside. She reveals that Carrie never messaged her, and that she'd scheduled the messages to send to her own phone. She admits that she even faked the graffiti, and her online profiles. She says Carrie was her best friend and that Carrie was obsessed with TJ, having rambled on about his interest in vintage trainers. Niamh accuses him of winding her up and driving her to hospitalization with his "wolfblood nonsense." He tries to explain the truth, but is interrupted by Niamh pointing out a hidden camera in the room and demanding a full confession before he will be released. Veining up and turning his eyes yellow, TJ growls into the camera and demands that Niamh look at him.
47	8	"Where Wolf"	Sarah Walker	Neil Jones	30 March 2016	0.181
TJ breaks out of the room Niamh has trapped him in and chases her outside as she attempts to call police, horrified that he's actually non-human. He demands to know how much of what she said was a lie, and she frantically apologizes. He comes to his senses and swears he won't hurt her, but she calls him a freak and threatens to expose the video of him if he doesn't leave her alone. Jana gets a call from Imara confirming that Carrie is at a secure Segolia building undergoing therapy. Katrina and Jeffries catch up and he sells her one of his books, telling her she is in it; she and the K's have become Jamelia, Jay, and Jenara. TJ meets with Jana and tells her what's happened, saying they should tell Imara. Jana immediately rejects this idea, fearing the rash decisions Imara might make. Niamh has demanded that she be allowed to see Carrie for proof that Carrie is also a wolfblood, and Jana begins planning a way to let the girls reunite. She goes to meet with Imara and explains the graffiti, mentioning a remaining bit of guilt when it comes to Carrie, before trying to get Imara to give up Carrie's location. Imara changes the topic to Jeffries, and Jana asks Imara to trust her. TJ learns that Niamh's real name is Holly as well as finding her address, but Jana tells him they can't find Carrie. They decide to send Jeffries in to speak with Holly. At Holly's house, Jeffries gives her a copy of Bloodwolf and talks to her about the secret through the window, relating to her initial fear and confusion towards the wolfbloods. He assures her that TJ and his pack are good, finally telling her they can't bring Carrie to Holly, but that they might be able to bring her to Carrie. They meet with Jana and TJ, and Holly gives Jana a t-shirt connected to a fond memory of Carrie. Jana uses ansion and sees a concert the girls snuck off to before Carrie moved away. She senses Carrie's inner agony and hatred towards her wolf and establishes enough of a connection to track her through eolas. They convince Whitewood to give them a ride and Jeffries happily meets with her. She warns Jana that Carrie isn't in the best condition and hasn't been responding to her treatments. Holly and TJ have a brief banter where he admits that he never lied about liking her. At the Segolia building, Jana, TJ, and Holly put on masks and sneak into the building while Jeffries creates a diversion. They creep through the halls until they find Carrie, finding her lethargic and loopy, and she assures Holly that she's doing great. The girls have a private reunion where she says she's starting a new life, and asks Holly to move on and forget about the wolfbloods. The group hurriedly flee as an alarm goes off, and Carrie watches from a window as the others run off. Back in her room, Imara calls Carrie on a video screen and tells her she did very well. Matei reads a copy of Bloodwolf and has a brief standoff with Jeffries, telling him he found the book "interesting." Emilia reads the title for the next book, "The War With The Humans." Jana expresses surprise that Matei is a reader, and he says there is a lot about him she doesn't know. TJ meets with Holly in the Kafe and she tells him she deleted her videos of him. She asks if he really did like her, and confesses that she'd be happy if he wanted to call her sometime. He opens his phone as if to message her, catches Selina's eye, and deletes her contact instead. Selina smiles at him, and they go to join the others.
48	9	"Into the Wild"	John Dower	Matt Sinclair	5 April 2016	N/A
TJ comes down with a fever and various aches and Imara realises he is going to transform during the upcoming full moon. He is thrilled to realise his time has finally come to transform, and happily agrees to go to Norway with Imara, Jana, and the other Segolia wolfbloods. However, Imara says Jana can't come to Norway this month as she's on a mission. At the Kafe, Whitewood tells Jana they need to return to the wild pack together to see how Meinir is coming along, and Jana happily agrees. Emilia overhears them planning and hatches a plan of her own to follow them to the wild. TJ confronts Jana over missing his first transformation and tells the others the good news. Jana asks for the next day off to attend a supposed dinner with the Ciprianis, though Whitewood accidentally reveals that she and Jana have a trip planned the next day. Katrina questions the pack about Jana's work for Segolia, and Emilia proposes that they follow Jana tomorrow. Katrina agrees, and after she leaves Emilia says she really plans to lose Katrina somewhere in the woods before they find the wild pack and transform. Selina opts out, but Matei eventually agrees. TJ, hurt about Jana choosing the wild over him, chooses to skip Norway and sneak off to the wild as well. Emilia and Matei sync their phones and plant one in Jana's car so TJ can track the signal, and the next day they gather to follow Jana and Whitewood. They drive into the woods before moving on on foot, and Katrina, TJ, and the Covacis are close behind. Imara attempts to find TJ but comes up empty handed. Jana and Whitewood find the wild pack, and Jana has a tense reunion with her father Alric, discovering that he is gravely ill. He claims this will be his last full moon, and Jana meets the new pack healer Madoc. The wild wolfbloods, especially Madoc, are unhappy with Whitewood's presence but tolerate it at Alric's urging. Whitewood and Jana learn that Meinir's wolf has faded once again, and she has gone with Ceri and Gerwyn to start a new life elsewhere. The Covacis and TJ are unable to shake Katrina, and inadvertently lead her straight to the wild pack. As wild wolfbloods surround the four of them and wolf out, Jana runs to Katrina's aid and stands against the wild wolfbloods. Katrina, seeing Jana with yellow eyes and dark veins, passes out. Alric interrupts and demands that the wild wolfbloods leave TJ, the Covacis, and Katrina alone. He reaches for Jana and the two embrace, with him asking Jana to lead the wild pack if Madoc is unable to heal him as his final wish.
49	10	"The Wild at Heart"	John Dower	Matt Sinclair	6 April 2016	N/A
The wolfbloods struggle to get Alric back into bed as the cubs meet Emilia, whom they've already heard about due to Meinir. They show the Covacis around the territory as TJ and Whitewood reluctantly share the secret with Katrina. Madoc warns Alric not to trust Whitewood or her medicine, and he opts to trust Madoc. Whitewood attempts to speak with Madoc but he snaps at her, and Alric sends all but Jana and Madoc from the tent. Alric says Aran has been lost without his sister and asks Jana to rule the pack by Aran's side. Jana rejects the idea, saying Alric will be healed soon, and Madoc agrees as he feeds Alric medicine from a bowl. The pack gather under the full moon and begin to wolf out as TJ relishes in the change, and Whitewood wanders out to watch in amazement. Katrina follows her and begins to record the pack with her phone, filming each individual's entire transformation before passing out again from shock. In the morning, TJ ecstatically relives the previous night as Katrina works through her shock. Whitewood again attempts to check on Alric before Madoc angrily interrupts. The cubs form a fascination with Katrina's makeup as Jana dodges Aran's touch and company. She rejects him when he suggests they lead the pack together, insisting Aran is like a brother to her, but he says it is not about them but about the pack. She goes and tries to plead with Madoc to take Alric to Segolia for treatment, but Madoc insults her trust in humans and tells her to leave with her pack and her humans. When she refuses, he has her assist him by giving Alric the same medicine from a bowl. Emilia happily explores wild life and comes across Madoc as he gathers plants to make more medicine. She tries to jump out and startle him but he is unbothered. Whitewood finds them and tries again to convince Madoc to share medicinal recipes, but he accuses her of coming from a long line of destruction. She sees something off with the plants he is gathering, but he distracts her by pointing out the various plants grown in the woods. She spots a gathering of poisonous hemlock. He corners her and Emilia, backing them off a cliff edge, where they cling onto the edge to keep from falling. He leaves them there, shouting for help. Alric's condition is worsening, and Madoc returns with plants for Jana to mix and give to Alric. He tells Jana he is willing to take Alric's place as alpha until Jana and Aran are ready to take the position themselves, and she agrees that that would be best. Matei hears Emilia's and Whitewood's yells as Jana herself goes to find Whitewood, and the two arrive just in time to rescue Emilia and Whitewood. They quickly tell Matei and Jana of Madoc's treachery, and they return to the others to reveal that he has been poisoning Alric. The wild pack corners him but he transforms and runs off into the trees. Alric, beginning to recover, expresses regret for trusting Madoc. He tries to convince Jana to stay, and she tells him that she's got a calling in the human world to follow. He announces that his pack and Jana's are now joined, telling Jana how proud he is of her and the leader she's become. She says goodbye to Aran, telling him he will make a good alpha and good partner for the right wolf, and Katrina gives her makeup kit to the cubs. Emilia unexpectedly announces her intention to stay in the wild, saying it is in her heart and where she belongs. Matei doesn't want to leave her there, but she reiterates that he doesn't have to worry about her anymore. Jana says she should get to stay if she is drawn to the wild, and the siblings share a tearful goodbye.
50	11	"Viral"	John Dower	Debbie Moon	12 April 2016	N/A
Jana and Katrina return to the Kafe from the wild, finding Kay asleep on the sofa after covering while Katrina was away. She questions the two on where they were but they say it was just a camping trip gone wrong. While they're out of the room, Kay snoops through Katrina's phone and finds the recording of the wild wolfbloods transforming, sending the video to herself before putting the phone back where she found it. That night, masked figures break into the Kafe and place a hand over Katrina's mouth as she sleeps. She recognizes Kay and Kara and demands to know what they're doing there, but they tell her to be quiet before they wake Jana. They turn and come face to face with Jana snarling and wolfing out. She demands Kay's and Kara's phones and deletes the video from them, and the two girls try to convince Katrina to leave with them. Katrina refuses, telling the girls she trusts Jana, and the girls flee from the Kafe. The next morning, TJ and Selina tease Matei about his flirtation with Jana. He accuses them of flirting with each other, but the trio is distracted when they see that the Kafe is closed. They go in and Jana tells them what has happened. Katrina apologizes profusely, and Jana asks her to talk to the K's and calm them down. She goes to meet with them, explaining that the wolfbloods are harmless and just want left in peace, and while Kay seems more empathetic Kara has no care for the wolfbloods at all. TJ tells Selina it would have been nice if she had transformed in the wild with them, but clams up and begins talking about his wolfblood abilities when Selina begins to flirt with him. She leaves, and TJ gets an upsetting call from Imara. Katrina works to make the K's see the wolfbloods' innocence, but Kara assures her she doesn't need to defend them anymore; she and Kay have already uploaded the video to the public. Imara brings Matei, Jana, and TJ in front of a television and shows them the video of them transforming in the wild, saying she is utterly speechless. She says that it's over for her and TJ there, and says a car will arrive at their house shortly to take him to the airport; she's sending him to Antigua. TJ refuses to leave, but Jana and Matei join hands and assure him that they'll go back to the wild pack and bring Katrina and that everyone will be safe. He leaves, and Jana deduces that Imara doesn't plan on making it to Antigua. Imara says she can buy enough time for Jana and TJ to escape, and refuses to listen to Jana's arguments. Jana and Matei leave to get Katrina, but she refuses to come back to the wild. In the Kafe, Jeffries is hounded by sudden fans of his books; Bloodwolf sales have unexpectedly skyrocketed. He begins to ask Jana and Matei about it when a reporter interrupts. Jana claims the video was a publicity stunt to draw attention to Bloodwolf and that TJ had done the digital effects. When the reporter challenges this answer and brings up Emilia's absence, Matei begins to vein up and he and Jana quickly leave. Jana tells Matei to go to the wild without her so she can get TJ, Selina, and Katrina, and the two embrace tightly and press their foreheads together. Matei sets off alone, but is quickly grabbed by suited men and forced into a black car before it speeds off. Selina, whose parents have called her lucky for not being in the video and urge her to keep her head down, runs up to Jana just in time to witness Matei's abduction and realise that TJ is in danger. She runs to his house, but Segolia agents have already taken him. Jana returns to the Kafe to find Katrina but instead finds the building empty with all the lights off. She follows a scent upstairs and comes face to face with Victoria Sweeney, who tells Jana that she needs her help.
51	12	"Protocol 5"	John Dower	Debbie Moon	13 April 2016	N/A
Sweeney assures Jana that her pack is safe, but implores Jana to come with her and help fix this situation. The two catch Selina's scent and Sweeney tries to convince her to bring Selina upstairs so they can use her against TJ. Jana instead sneaks out a side door with Selina and the two run away while Sweeney watches from an upstairs window. She makes a call to someone to tell them she was wrong about Jana, and to tell them to add her to the list for Protocol Five. Imara is led into Sweeney's office, and Sweeney tells her that TJ is in Carter Hall. This location causes Imara to wolf out, but Sweeney is unimpressed. She tells Imara to convince TJ to give up the location of Jana's den in the tunnels in exchange for the Ciprianis' freedom, and she agrees. Sweeney goes to meet with the K's and Jeffries, attempting to bribe them into helping Segolia by offering Jeffries a position as a medieval archive historian and to pay for the K's college educations. Kay and Kara agree but Katrina hesitates. Jana and Selina pull off a sneak attack on Sweeney, Imara, and a Segolia wolfblood named Robyn, and though Imara initially hesitates she helps Selina and Jana get away. Jana demands to know what Protocol Five really is. While locked in a cell in Carter Hall, Matei and TJ are met by Carrie, who assures them that Segolia is going to "take away their pain." She says they did it for her, and she is happier than ever. TJ and Matei realise she has been de-wolfed and that Segolia plans to do the same to them. Imara explains to Jana and Selina that if they do this, Segolia can test Matei and TJ and "prove" that they're human. Carrie goes on about the nightmare of living as a wolfblood despite TJ's and Matei's arguments, calling the wolf evil before they are interrupted by Sweeney's arrival. TJ and Matei confront Sweeney for taking Carrie's wolf, but she says it was necessary for Carrie's own good and that it was what Carrie wanted. Matei wonders what Carrie could have done that was so awful, and Sweeney says that Carrie killed his parents. Carrie says she was sent to see Mr. Covaci for counseling, and that he'd transformed during a session to show that his wolf wouldn't hurt her. She'd panicked instead, knocking items over and causing a fire that she managed to escape. Upon hearing this Matei begins to wolf out, but Carrie only repeats that it was the wolf's fault and that it's good it's gone before she's lead away. Sweeney announces her intention to de-wolf the boys and publicly test their DNA to protect the secret. She encourages the boys to think of all the wolfbloods they'll be saving with their sacrifice, naming Emilia specifically, and brings them to another room with beds that they are strapped into. As Matei cries wordlessly, TJ remarks that at least he got to transform once. The procedure is interrupted however by a phone call from Imara. She asks to speak to TJ, telling him that he won't lose his wolf before telling Sweeney that she'll turn Jana and Selina in for TJ's freedom. TJ tries to get through to Whitewood, who says she has no choice and must do this to protect the wolfblood secret. Jana and Selina go with Imara into the tunnels before being ambushed by Sweeney and Segolia agents. They are all brought to Segolia, where the friends reunite before Imara tells TJ to leave with her. He refuses, even after Jana tries to convince him to go. As the others continue trying to convince him to get out of this situation, Imara grabs the anti-wolfblood serum and holds it to Sweeney's neck, and the group makes their way outside to the car where Jana takes the device and steps behind Sweeney. As the others get into the car, Jana strikes a deal with Sweeney; she'll voluntarily give up her wolf if Sweeney lets the rest of her pack escape unharmed. Sweeney agrees, and Jana tells Imara to drive away. The pack try to get out and help Jana but they are too late. She is brought back inside and laid down, with Whitewood administering the serum. Jana begins veining up and howling, and Whitewood explains that her wild wolf is fighting harder against the serum when Sweeney wonders what is taking so long. Whitewood urges them all to leave Jana alone so her wolf can die in its own time as Jeffries holds a press conference to officially claim the viral video as a stunt for his book. Sweeney grows impatient and sends Robyn to find Whitewood and Jana, while in the tunnels the pack declares that no matter what, human or not, Jana will always be their alpha. Jana unexpectedly arrives, her wolf intact, with Whitewood in tow. Whitewood explains that she swapped the serums to buy time. The pack worry about how to end this once and for all, and Jana makes a decision. Back at the press conference, the K's talk about their supposed part in the video as Robyn tells Sweeney that Whitewood has vanished. Sweeney takes the microphone to continue denying the existence of werewolves as five wolves approach the building. A Segolia agent whispers in Sweeney's ear and chaos breaks out as the wolves suddenly burst into the building and step directly in front of the reporters and cameras. Jana, Matei, TJ, Selina, and Imara transform back into human form on live television and are immediately swarmed with questions. At the Kafe, the wolfbloods meet with Katrina, Jeffries, and Whitewood and tease Jeffries about possible future Bloodwolf books. Matei takes Jana's phone from her and asks her not to worry until later, and she takes his hand in hers. Kara and Kay arrive to apologize, explaining that they never wanted to cause this much trouble and only wanted to protect their friend. Katrina and the others forgive them, and they sit down with the others to join the party. Katrina holds a toast to the pack, and Jana shares a smile with Matei. Jana checks her phone one last time and goes to meet with Sweeney. On a rooftop overlooking the city, Sweeney warns Jana that she and her friends have changed everything. She says Segolia's finished, and that Jana will have to watch her back because not just humans will come after her; many wolfbloods consider Jana a traitor for her actions. Jana holds on to her hope that some day humans and wolfbloods can coexist again, and says goodbye to Victoria Sweeney.

=== Series 5 (2017) ===
No. overall	No. in series	Title	Directed by	Written by	Original release date	UK viewers (millions)
52	1	"Brave New World"	John Dower	Debbie Moon	27 February 2017	N/A
Jana runs from an unseen attacker. Matei, also running through the woods, transforms and jumps over Jana as another wolf jumps at her, and knocks the other wolfblood to the ground. Jana and Matei growl at this white-coated wolfblood, who runs away. Matei transforms back, wiping blood from his face, and asks Jana who the other wolfblood was. She says she doesn't know. In the tunnels, she cleans his wounds and he worries about the wolfbloods that have attacked Jana since her revelation of the secret. She says her presence is endangering the pack and that it's time for her to return to the wild. At the Kafe, wolfbloods gather and sit around with yellow eyes and dark veins; their comfort in wolfing out overwhelms Selina. Robyn attempts to work a shift at the Kafe with Katrina's guidance, having lost her job with Segolia. TJ tells wolfblood stories to a crowd as Matei arrives and calls an emergency pack-only meeting. Katrina comes over to ask when Jana will move back in, worried that Jana hides in the tunnels all the time these days, but Matei reveals her plan to leave. The others plan to show Jana how badly they need her to stay, though Robyn thinks it's futile. Jeffries arrives with a movie producer named Mr. Hartington, introducing him to the pack and announcing an upcoming film adaptation of Bloodwolf. While Selina and Matei are unimpressed, TJ agrees to meet with Hartington for dinner at his country manor the next night so that Hartington and his crew can film a wolfblood transformation for reference. Selina reminds him that tomorrow night's full moon is their last chance to convince Jana to stay, but TJ wrestles with the desire to rub shoulders with the rich and famous. He tells Selina that they're in the real world now and it's "every wolfblood for himself." Matei also tries to talk him out of it, but TJ argues that the Segolia job he was meant to inherit no longer exists and he has to find some way to support himself. At the Ciprianis' new flat, Jana and Imara corner the boys and reveal that Matei has texted Jana about Hartington. Imara is appalled that TJ would willingly transform for humans with cameras like a circus act, but he once again argues that this is his only way to make a name for himself. Matei accidentally reveals that Jana was attacked by another wolfblood, and Imara immediately begins to worry, saying that she is responsible for the pack in Jana's absence. Jana says the white-coated wolfblood most likely won't be back, and invites Imara to join the pack for the full moon tomorrow night, though she declines; she has plans with the remaining Segolia wolfbloods. At home, Selina receives a letter telling her she is barred from entering a series of Taekwondo championships due to her wolfblood nature, though her parents tell her not to be too upset and to let the dust settle, hoping the world will adjust to wolfbloods and accept them into more and more. That night, Jana awakens in the tunnels from a nightmare of the white-coated wolfblood attacking her. At school, a teacher keeps Matei after class to ask about an improvement in his grades as of late, which confuses him. He soon realizes she thinks he is cheating somehow with his wolfblood skills, and her refusal to believe him when he denies this soon causes him to vein up and he quickly leaves the room. Their conversation also reveals that wolfbloods at this point have been barred from all possible sports activities to prevent unfair advantages. Hannah reiterates this by harassing Selina in the school gym and telling her she isn't allowed to be there, though Selina argues she was only dropped from the Taekwondo team. Hannah makes several canine-related jokes and accuses Selina of cheating using her extra abilities, saying Selina has never deserved to win anything, but Selina ignores her and leaves. At the Kafe, Jana enters and all attention instantly shifts to her; she is both famous and infamous after the reveal of the secret. She goes into the back bedroom to pack her belongings and Katrina tries to convince Jana to stay. Jana shuts down, but Katrina reiterates how important Jana is to the pack. Jana insists she cannot stay and leaves. TJ tries to convince Selina and Matei to come to Hartington's manor with him, but Selina instead proposes that the pack go to the wild permanently with Jana. The boys try to argue, but Selina points out that the pack's families either blame them for what happened or simply want to hide away. They discuss the weight of the decision, and Matei eventually agrees despite TJ's refusal. In the bedroom the boys now share, Matei packs his things while TJ tries to convince him not to go. Matei says he doesn't want to stay so he can be called a cheater and intrude on the Ciprianis' home, but TJ assures him they want Matei there. Even still, Matei is determined to go and TJ leaves to meet Hartington. At Hartington's, TJ is given an enthusiastic introduction and sat at the head of the table opposite Hartington. He and Jeffries attempt to make conversation but are interrupted when the first course is served; TJ notices a tattoo of an "H" on his server's wrist. Another dinner guest asks Jeffries about the Bloodwolf books' future, seeming particularly interested in "The War with the Humans," and TJ sees an identical tattoo on the guest's upper arm. In the woods, Jana tries to convince Matei and Selina to stay in the human world, but both refuse to change their minds. Katrina arrives and realises the others plan to leave, too, and becomes hurt. They apologise for leaving her but she storms off, and they are unable to go after her as they begin to transform. Katrina walks through the woods before the white-coated wolfblood corners her and she begins to yell for Jana. Hartington realises TJ is about to transform and leads him into a clear box in the back of the dining room. Jeffries tells the unnerved TJ that he doesn't have to do this if he no longer wants to, but TJ steels himself and enters the box. Once inside, the door is locked and TJ begins wolfing out. The guests hold a toast to him, and Jeffries passes out from a drugged drink. TJ tries to get to him, but cannot escape the box and transforms. Hartington presses a button and gas begins to fill the box as he tells TJ to sleep and that Hartington and his friends have big plans for him.
53	2	"The Once and Future Alpha"	John Dower	Debbie Moon	6 March 2017	N/A
The white-coated wolfblood stalks Katrina before Jana, Matei, and Selina fight them off, and another wolfblood arrives to help. In the morning, this other wolfblood——revealed to be Aran——restrains the white—coated wolfblood and drags her along. Matei asks after Emilia, whereupon the white-coated wolfblood——Hafren——reveals that Emilia is "lost." She uses this distraction to break free of Aran, though she is quickly caught again. He and Matei drag her into the tunnels, where Aran says that the wild territory has been lost after humans combed the woods to see and film the wild wolfbloods. He says that Emilia tried to speak with the humans but was instead ignored and shoved, which caused a fight that drew the police. The pack has scattered, though Alric is safe and searching for new territory, but Emilia cannot be found. Hafren blames Jana for the exposure to humans and says that Emilia actually has returned to the pack, but Hafren remains astray exclusively to get revenge on Jana. Jana sends Matei and Selina to the Kafe for food while she goes to look for herbs to help heal Hafren's injured leg. Jeffries awakens at Hartington's manor alone and realises they have taken TJ. Imara calls asking after TJ and he reveals that he was drugged and TJ has vanished. At the Kafe, Robyn attempts to comfort Katrina after her traumatic run-in with Hafren before Imara interrupts to speak with Robyn. Selina and Matei listen in and learn that Robyn is hiding the location of an archive for Imara, who begins to ask for money to pay Hartington's demanded ransom before Jeffries arrives and interrupts. Robyn says she will take Imara to the archive and Imara tells Selina, Matei, and Jeffries to stay at the Kafe. TJ awakens, still in the clear box, and reluctantly takes water from Hartington. Hartington admits he isn't really a movie producer and that he's been researching wolfbloods long before their name was public knowledge. He and TJ discuss the connection between a wolfblood and their wolf, and Hartington name-drops Carrie Black and references her choice to eradicate her wolf. TJ says no other wolfblood would ever give up their wolf, and Hartington says they'll see about that. In the tunnels, Hafren argues with Jana over her decision to expose the secret and accuses her of running away now that she's ruined everything. Aran sticks up for her by pointing out that exposing the secret has cost Jana everything, too, but Hafren seems unreceptive. Selina hurries in to tell Jana that Hartington has taken TJ and Jana uses eolas to track him. Robyn and Imara arrive at an unknown Segolia building. Robyn begs Imara never to let on that any of this building's contents still exist, but Imara says she only wants to save her son. Robyn gives Imara diamonds to pay Hartington's ransom, but Imara admits she doesn't need money and instead downloads a file onto a USB. Robyn tries to stop her, but Imara says she is taking the file no matter what and leaves. Hartington speaks to TJ and makes further references to events he should not know about, and says that Imara will give him exactly what he wants. He pulls a tarp over the box and loads it into a van, driving off just as Jana, Matei, and Selina arrive. They give chase, taking a shortcut and following the van to a field. In the tunnels, Aran gives Hafren water and Hafren says Jana will abandon them for her tame and human friends; Aran dismisses this easily. Hafren decides to stop targeting Jana and instead seek revenge against humans, but Aran says he only wants to go back to the wild and live in peace again. She tearfully agrees with him and he unties her wrists. Imara arrives and Hartington threatens to set off an ultra-sound siren that would be loud enough to incapacitate any wolfbloods in the area if she doesn't hand over the USB. Jana steps in, and Matei and Selina sneak into the van. Selina holds TJ's hand through a hole in the box as Matei steals the keys from the front of the van. Hartington notices that something is going on in the van and prepares to set off the siren, but Imara and Jana run to stop him. They fall just short as Hafren runs onto the field as well and attacks Jana. Matei unlocks TJ and Selina joins the fight as the boys attempt to escape. Hartington sets off the alarm, and the wolfbloods' sensitive hearing is overwhelmed to the point of each of them collapsing as Hartington takes the USB from Imara's hand and drives away. Aran finds Jana and wakes her and the others up, apologizing for letting Hafren escape. Jana scolds Imara for not involving the others as soon as Hartington demanded a ransom, and asks what was on the USB. Imara says it was a master file of the names and addresses of every wolfblood in the United Kingdom. She says that most of the addresses will be outdated, but the others remind her that most of them won't be; Selina fears that her parents, who have moved homes to protect themselves, are on that list and are in danger after all. At the Kafe later, TJ blames himself for what's happened and apologises for being mean to Selina. Robyn, however, blames herself for not stopping Imara from taking the file and is surprised when Katrina offers her Jana's old room. She accepts, and smiles to herself. In the woods, Jana brings Aran meat and he says he must return to the wild and warn the pack about Hartington. He tells her she must keep her own pack safe, promising to send Emilia home once he's found her and stepping away when Jana tries to touch him. He says his goodbyes and leaves. In the wild, Hafren repeats to herself that she has no fear of fire and walks past a lit torch and campfire, throwing her arms up in triumph as another wolfblood nods to her in approval.
54	3	"The Dawnus Torc"	John Dower	Michelle Gayle	13 March 2017	1.00
The pack search the Segolia Vault for any files or information on Hartington and Jana opens a dusty box to find a gold neckpiece, which she instantly recognizes as an ancient wolfblood relic known as the Dawnus Torc, warning the others that only the “chosen” can touch it or they may be met by bad luck. TJ touches it anyhow and Jana grabs it from him angrily, instantly veining up and turning her eyes yellow involuntarily; she is locked in a vision of what she calls Blydissiad, a holy land for wolfbloods. She shares the vision with the pack and Imara argues that Blydissiad is only a myth, though Jana puts the Torc around her neck and leaves the vault. The others chase after her but she insists on following the vision and finding Blydissiad, where she can save all wolfbloods from the fate she blames herself for bringing them. Matei returns with Imara to the vault and TJ and Selina go after Jana. At the vault, Imara finds a file on a project called Project Genesis and leaves to investigate it. She says to leave Jana to discover Blydissiad’s nonexistence for herself, but Matei joins TJ and Selina in trying to bring her back. Unknown to the pack, Hartington follows them and watches from afar as Matei asks Jana about Blydissiad. She says she saw herself and her pack in the future in a safe valley, howling at the moon in a wolfblood paradise. Matei reminds Jana that they don’t want to live alone in the wild amongst their own kind, but rather want to live alongside humans in both worlds. Selina, finding herself very uncomfortable in the wild, agrees that the human world is preferable. TJ complains that he feels very ill, sweating and growing pale, and Jana tells the others that they aren’t cut out for the wild. She tells them to leave her, and Matei accuses her of abandoning her pack but she continues after Blydissiad regardless. On the way back to the city, Selina says she’s relieved to be going back to the human world as TJ, falling behind, becomes feverish and collapses. Selina calls Imara, but the call cannot go through and she and Matei howl for Jana. Hearing her pack’s howls, Jana uses eolas and sees TJ’s condition, running back to them immediately. Upon removing TJ’s jacket, they find an infected wound on his back and Jana and Matei go to collect herbs. TJ, delirious, calls Selina beautiful and says he loves her, though he shortly after calls for his mother and causes Selina to believe he was hallucinating and speaking to Imara rather than herself. Jana spots Hartington and warns the pack, telling them to move TJ out of Hartington’s line of sight and not let on that they know he’s there. Jana makes a remedy for TJ and treats his back though she needs fabric, and though Selina initially begins to remove her hijab, Matei gives his jacket and Jana applies the medicine. She then investigates the wound and finds a small device, realising it must be a tracker planted during TJ’s time as Hartington’s captive. Infuriated that TJ has been chipped like a dog Selina begins to wolf out before Jana says they can use the tracker to their advantage. As he begins to wake up, TJ asks what happened to him and Selina explains the tracker. Selina asks why he called her beautiful, adding that he told her he loved her, and he says she is beautiful to everyone but he must have been very feverish to say that he loved her. Hurt, she apologizes and walks away from him. Matei and Jana set up a trap for Hartington and use TJ’s tracker to lure him in, capturing him and demanding to know why he is following them. He tells TJ he can’t reveal that information but that he never intended for him to get infected. He accuses the wolfbloods of lying when they say they want to live peacefully, alluding to a plan bigger than himself and admitting he is in league with others who believe the wolfbloods have a conspiracy to overthrow humanity. He distracts them from further questioning by asking about the Dawnus Torc, saying he knows of its creation and of Blydissiad. The others warn Jana not to trust him but she asks for more information, and Hartington mentions an ancient wild pack known as Adolfus and their scribe that tells the story of them having to abandon their territory and paradise after a Roman invasion. He finishes by mentioning that one day, a chosen wolfblood will take possession of the Torc and rediscover Blydissiad, which he claims is in Sheffield, calling the entire legend a myth. He tells them they should not be worrying about Blydissiad but about Imara, whom he says is thirty minutes away from being taken by Hartington’s men. The pack run to rescue her, though they arrive at the Ciprianis’ apartment to find Imara safe and alone, conducting research. Matei asks about the status of the research as Jana comes to realise her vision of Blydissiad was not of the future, but of the past through ansion. They vow to take Hartington down as Imara’s computer malfunctions, and Imara realises Segolia wanted to make sure that whatever is in the Project Genesis files can never be found by anyone.
55	4	"The Shadow in the Light"	John Dower	Matt Sinclair	20 March 2017	1.01
At school Selina asks TJ if he’s feeling alright, telling him her parents have been furious with her after her brief escape to the wild. Hannah, blocking their path, mocks the two of them and howls as she pushes past them. Selina, TJ, and Matei continue to the lockers to find Selina’s defaced with a spray-painted “H,” and as Selina blames Hannah TJ says he recognizes it as the tattoo on Hartington’s guests. At the Kafe, Katrina’s grandfather sprays air freshener after Jana walks in to get rid of the smell of “wet dog,” and Jana decides to move back into the flat with Katrina and Robyn. At the school, TJ tries to ask Hannah why she defaced Selina’s locker but she denies her involvement, mocking him until he veins up and calling for her classmates’ help. Back with Selina and Matei, the three plan to follow her after school. Meanwhile, Imara and Jana go to see Mr. Jeffries in his new apartment and ask about his relationship with Hartington. He says he met Hartington in a restaurant and is just as clueless as the others, expressing his frustration that Hartington never actually intended to help further his career. He laments that he may have to go back to teaching after a contract signed with Hartington ensures he won’t make another cent from Bloodwolf, and Imara asks to see the contract. They find the address of Hartington’s real business on it and Jeffries says he will tag along to investigate to make sure there will be at least one clear head——a human “in a good way”——present. Following Hannah, TJ, Selina, and Matei catch her spraypainting another “H” and follow her to a dojo where a trainer named Birdie encourages a hatred of wolfbloods as Selina watches. In a back office, TJ and Matei find a poster revealing that the “H” stands for “Humans” before they are caught by another trainer who locks them in a closet and reveals she knows they are wolfbloods. Selina reveals herself and challenges Birdie to a fight, bargaining that she and her friends be released upon her victory. In the locker room, Hannah helps Selina into her kit and warns her that Birdie is an experienced fighter and Selina’s wolfblood skills may not help her. Selina argues that wolfbloods hardly have an advantage but that humans have advantages of their own. Hannah says humans are still the underdogs, and Selina laughs at the unintended pun. Upon arriving at Hartington’s business, Jana finds Selina’s mother in a side room filling out a “Wolfblood questionnaire,” asking questions about perceived feelings of humanity, situations most likely to cause one to wolf out, and others. Agent Jones, an agent who questioned Jana and several of the other wolfbloods after the secret was initially revealed, says she is heading this project and claims to have no idea who Hartington is. Angry that she has been demoted after her past experiences with Jana and her pack, she says she cannot help them and asks for evidence of Hartington’s actions. She gives Jana a few copies of the survey and sends them away. Selina and Birdie fight, with Birdie admitting that Selina is a good fighter as she gains the upper hand. Birdie calls his friends into the fight and Hannah unexpectedly joins on Selina’s side, arguing that Birdie has made the fight unfair. They take down Birdie and the other trainers together, freeing TJ and Matei and leaving the dojo. The four flee the building together, though Hannah and Selina fall behind. She tells Selina that she’s never hated wolfbloods, but rather hates Selina specifically. She says Birdie has been her trainer for a while and she never joined the Humans group, though she is still determined to train and be better than Selina. Realizing she’s left her clothes in the locker room, Hannah offers to let Selina borrow some of hers for the time being and get Selina’s things the next day. At the Kafe, the pack look over the surveys and realise Hartington and his team have taken events from Bloodwolf at face value, with one of the questions asking if wolfbloods have really formed an army to take humanity down. Selina and Hannah arrive and explain Hannah’s innocence, with Hannah saying that though humans are mostly ignorant they have real reason to worry about the wolfbloods and the threat they may pose. Jana speaks with Selina alone and tells her about Mrs. Khan’s presence at Hartington’s business, asking her to talk to her mother about the surveys as the pack worry that the government is the latest to turn against the wolfbloods.
56	5	"Humans"	John Dower	Ed Aldridge	27 March 2017	1.11
TJ's good intentions land him in hot water with Selina, the Humans group target the Kafe and a face from the past returns to take action that will change everything.
57	6	"The Last Dark Moon"	Steve Hughes	Neil Jones	3 April 2017	0.99
It is dark moon day, and Katrina's grandfather has made the Kafe a wolfblood-free zone. Matei is reunited with Emilia, but finds that she is not who she used to be. Her fate rests with Hannah, while Imara and Jana make a breakthrough in proving the conspiracy – but who can they trust?
58	7	"Torn"	Steve Hughes	Simon Underwood	10 April 2017	0.99
Jana and the pack ask Emilia to tread carefully now that they suspect government officials are conspiring with Hartington to chip and de-wolf wolfbloods. But Emilia has no intention of backing down and makes a public display of rebellion. Matei learns Eolas and chooses a side.
59	8	"The One Who Sees"	Steve Hughes	Victoria Asare-Archer	17 April 2017	0.87
Unable to help Selina's parents, Jana resolves to find a way to help the other trapped wolfbloods, starting with the Genesis Project. Matei returns to the den to seek Jana's help in convincing Emilia that her vision of Blydissiad is false.
60	9	"The War With the Humans"	Steve Hughes	Debbie Moon	24 April 2017	0.78
Jana is forced to realise that she can't save everyone and must make a decision about her future. TJ and Matei track Emilia but discover that Madoc is now pack leader. They join the journey to Blydissiad but are in for a shock.
61	10	"United We Stand"	Steve Hughes	Debbie Moon	1 May 2017	N/A
Jana fulfils her promise to come after Hartington. Dr Whitewood discovers the amazing truth about Project Genesis. TJ finds himself with a huge responsibility.
