= Wolfblood =

British-German fantasy teen drama television series

- Genre: Fantasy; Teen drama Horror; Children's television series
- Created by: Debbie Moon
- Starring: Aimee Kelly; Bobby Lockwood; Kedar Williams-Stirling; Louisa Connolly-Burnham; Leona Vaughan; Louis Payne; Gabrielle Green; Jack Brett Anderson; Sydney Wade; Michelle Gayle; Rukku Nahar
- Theme music composer: Andy Price; Nick Holywell-Walker
- Opening theme: "A Promise That I Keep" by Lisa Knapp (series 1–3); "Running with the Wolves" by Aurora (series 4–5, Wolfblood Secrets)
- Ending theme: "A Promise That I Keep" (instrumental) (series 1–3); "Running with the Wolves" by Aurora (series 4–5, Wolfblood Secrets)
- Countries of origin: United Kingdom; Germany
- Original languages: English; German
- No. of series: 5, Wolfblood Secrets
- No. of episodes: 61 (list of episodes)

Production
- Executive producers: Gina Cronk; Spencer Campbell; Lis Steele; Lucy Martin; Arne Lohmann
- Producers: Foz Allan; Jonathan Wolfman
- Cinematography: Tony Coldwell; Richard Mahoney; Tim Pollard; Simon Bell; Andy McDonnell; James Moss
- Editors: Matthew Tabern; Tim Marchant; Calum Ross; Tom White; Bjorn Johnson; John Parker; Belinda Cottrell; David Fisher; Lois Bygrave; Adam Masters; Agnieszka Liggett; David Stark
- Camera setup: Single-camera
- Running time: 21–24 minutes
- Production companies: BBC; ZDF Enterprises

Original release
- Network: CBBC
- Release: 10 September 2012 – 1 May 2017

Wolfblood is a British-German fantasy teen drama television series. Created by Debbie Moon, it is a co-production between CBBC and ZDF/ZDF Enterprises. The television series revolves around the life of the species known as wolfbloods. They are creatures that have enhanced senses and look like humans but can turn into wolves at will. They consider themselves to be distinct from werewolves of myth, but just like werewolves, their transformation is uncontrolled during a full moon, and they are at their weakest during "the dark of the moon", at a new moon. The television series focuses on their daily life and the challenges that they face to hide their secret. Each series has new characters and concepts.

The television series has won the Royal Television Society Award for the Children's Drama category in 2013. It also won the Banff Rockie Award in the category for 'Best Children's Programme (fiction)' in the same year. In 2015 the television series won the British Screenwriters' Award in the category 'Best British Children's Television'.

== Episodes ==
Series	Episodes	Originally released	
Series	Episodes	First released	Last released
1	13	10 September 2012	22 October 2012
2	13	9 September 2013	21 October 2013
3	13	15 September 2014	27 October 2014
4	12	8 March 2016	13 April 2016
5	10	27 February 2017	1 May 2017

== Cast ==
=== Main ===
- Aimee Kelly as Madeline "Maddy" Smith (series 1–2)
- Bobby Lockwood as Rhydian Morris (series 1–3)
- Kedar Williams-Stirling as Thomas "Tom" Okanawe (series 1–3)
- Louisa Connolly-Burnham as Shannon Kelly (series 1–3)
- Gabrielle Green as Katrina MacKenzie (series 1–5)
- Leona Vaughan as Jana (series 2-5)
- Louis Payne as Terrence "TJ" Cipriani (series 4–5)
- Jack Brett Anderson as Matei Covaci (series 4–5)
- Sydney Wade as Emilia Covaci (series 4–5)
- Michelle Gayle as Imara Cipriani (series 4–5)
- Rukku Nahar as Selina Khan (series 4–5)

=== Recurring ===
- Shorelle Hepkin as Kay Lawrence (series 1–4)
- Rachel Teate as Kara Waterman (series 1–4)
- Jonathan Raggett as Jin Gau 'Jimi' Chen (series 1–3)
- Niek Versteeg as Liam Hunter (series 1–3, Wolfblood Secrets)
- Nahom Kassa as Sam (series 1–3)
- Mark Fleischmann as Mr. Tim Jeffries (series 1–5, Wolfblood Secrets)
- Marcus Garvey as Daniel "Dan" Smith (series 1–2)
- Angela Lonsdale as Emma Smith (series 1–2)
- Ursula Holden-Gill as Miss Fitzgerald (series 1–3)
- Clara Onyemere as Miss Parrish (series 1–3)
- Siwan Morris as Ceri (series 1–3, Wolfblood Secrets)
- Bill Fellows as Bernie (series 1–2)
- Alun Raglan as Alric (series 2–4)
- Lisa Marged as Meinir (series 2–4)
- Cerith Flinn as Aran (recurring: series 2–4, guest: series 5)
- Effie Woods (series 2) and Letty Butler (series 3–5, Wolfblood Secrets) as Dr. Rebecca Whitewood
- Dean Bone as Harry Averwood (series 2–3)
- Phillippa Wilson as Mrs. Vaughan (series 2–3)
- Mandeep Dhillon as Dacia Turner (series 3)
- Richard Harrington as Gerwyn (series 3)
- Lottie Rhodes as Gwyn (series 3–4)
- Jake Shingler as Cadwr (series 3–4)
- Jacqueline Boatswain as Victoria Sweeney (series 3–4)
- Shaun Dooley as Alexander "Alex" Kincaid (series 3)
- Sharon Percy as Karen MacKenzie (series 3)
- Jonah Rice as Ollie (series 3)
- Robbie Farrell as Joe (series 3)
- Alex Ferns as Alistair MacKenzie (series 4)
- Natasha Goulden as Robyn (series 4–5)
- Chloe Hesar as Carrie (series 4)
- Sydney Craven as Hannah (series 4–5)
- Alana Boden as Holly (series 4)
- Fraser James as Madoc (series 4–5)
- Rod Glenn as Warrior Wolfblood (series 4–5)
- Nila Aalia as Sofia Khan (series 4–5)
- Pal Aron as Adnan Khan (series 4–5)
- Andrew Scarborough as Joshua Hartington (series 5)
- Laura Greenwood as Hafren (series 5)
- Trevor Cooper as Grandad MacKenzie (series 5)
- William Fox as Birdie (series 5)
- Ruby Barker as Daisie (series 5)
- Samantha Power as Agent Jones (series 5, Wolfblood Secrets)

=== Guest ===
- Sam Fender as Dean (episode 1.6)

== Plot ==
- Series 1 deals with Maddy Smith and Rhydian Morris trying to balance their lives as wolfbloods with their human sides, while trying to keep their secret from being exposed. The start of the show sees Maddy, who lives with her wolfblood family in Stoneybridge, Northumbria, coming ever closer to her first transformation. When new boy Rhydian arrives at Bradlington High School, Maddy recognises him as being a wolfblood too. Rhydian, who lives with his foster family, has only recently started changing into a wolf, having been unaware of wolfbloods prior to his move to Stoneybridge. The Smith family claim him as a distant cousin, and help him settle in and learn about the wolfblood way of life. Rhydian becomes friends with Maddy's best friends Tom and Shannon, who are unaware of Maddy's and Rhydian's secret. As the series ends Tom and Shannon finally learn the truth. Rhydian was the star of series one, which became a popular hit for young teens.
- A webisode titled The Scape Goat takes place between the first and second series. Jana, daughter of wild wolfblood pack leader Alric, persuades Rhydian to take her to a town so that she can experience the human world. Upon their return to the forest they are discovered and Alric, already disgusted by Rhydian's failure on his first hunt, sentences him to be tied to a rock without food or water for a fortnight. Sensing that Alric is bent upon Rhydian's destruction come what may, Rhydian's biological mother, Ceri, secretly helps him to escape.
- Series 2 is set three months after the series 1 finale. Jana arrives in Stoneybridge, claiming to have been exiled from the wild wolfblood pack. Despite occasional conflicts with Maddy, she befriends Maddy, Rhydian, Tom and Shannon and falls in love with the human world. Eventually she leaves to become the new wild wolfblood pack leader, her father having been exiled. It is discovered that Shannon is spying on the Smiths and collecting information on werewolves. When Maddy is almost killed as a result, she decides to destroy all of the data she has gathered. Liam, a boy at their school, then also begins investigating werewolves. Suspicious of the Smith family, he steals a dog chew from which Dr. Whitewood is able to extract and analyse a sample of the DNA of Maddy's father. With the results proving that the Smiths are not human they are forced to leave the country and, with the help of a contact, go to Canada. At the series' conclusion Maddy says goodbye to her friends and confesses her love for Rhydian.
- Between series 2 and series 3 seven webisodes known as Jana Bites take place. They tell the story of Jana's adventures as pack leader of the wild wolfbloods, and end with her being shot and injured while trying to lead hunters away from the pack. This leads to her reappearance in series 3.
- Series 3 is set two months after Maddy and her family leave Stoneybridge. Rhydian is heartbroken after Maddy's departure. Jana returns from the wild wolfblood pack in dire need of help, bringing with her new allies. Together with his friends, Tom, Shannon and Jana, Rhydian attempts to focus on life beyond school and Stoneybridge. Rhydian meets a new wolfblood named Dacia from a biotech company called Segolia, which assists wolfbloods and helped the Smiths to leave the country. She tells him that Maddy and her parents are safe in Canada, and offers him a job with the company which is secretly run by wolfbloods and their human allies. It transpires that Segolia is researching the medical uses of wolfblood DNA. They are particularly interested in Jana and her wild pack because they have special abilities, verging on telepathy or magic, that are lost to other wolfbloods. Dr. Whitewood reappears, still desperate to find evidence of wolfbloods, but Dacia prevents her from revealing the wolfblood secret by bribing her with the offer of a job at Segolia. As the series accelerates towards a climax, Rhydian must unite the wild wolfblood pack or their species will face extinction. The series ends with Rhydian reuniting with Maddy (both in wolf form) in the snow in Canada.
- Set between series 3 and 4 is an animated motion comic on the CBBC website known as New Moon Rising. Victoria Sweeney, the head of Segolia's security, sends Jana to investigate an elderly wolfblood and his nurse, while Shannon and Tom visit Rhydian and Maddy in Canada. This comic makes a "happy ending" for Rhydian, Maddy, her family and friends, as the characters all left the show.
- Series 4 is set in a big city that Jana moves to after leaving Stoneybridge, where she joins her former classmate Katrina (who now runs her uncle's "Kafe" café) and Mr Jeffries (her ex-head teacher turned author of "Bloodwolf" young adult novels). The city is unnamed, but the Tyne Bridge in Newcastle appears in some scenes and also the new animated opening credits.

Jana meets three new wolfblood families - brother and sister Matei and Emilia from Eastern Europe, TJ and his mother Imara who are Afro-Caribbean, and Selina and her parents who are Muslims. They become the catalyst for the formation of a new pack. With the wolfblood secret looking increasingly fragile, the pressures on Jana grow, forcing her to question where she truly belongs and who she can trust. This leads to a cataclysmic decision that will change all of their lives forever.

- Set between series 4 and 5 is an animated motion comic on the CBBC website known as Hunter's Moon.

Also between series 4 and 5 ten mini-episodes known as Wolfblood Secrets take place. It consisted of scenes set in an office run by an unnamed organisation where members of the series 4 cast were interviewed by 2 mysterious characters - Mr. Smith, and his superior, Ms. Jones - who want to know all they can about Wolfbloods. This was intercut with clips from Wolfblood episodes to illustrate what they are talking about. Jones returns as a character in series 5.

- Series 5 begins with the secret no longer a secret, and the world has changed for Jana, Matei, Selina, TJ, and Imara. Suddenly they are the most visible wolfbloods on the planet, and everyone has an opinion about what they did. Some humans are excited by the reveal of this new species – and some are hostile and scared. As tensions rise on both sides, difficult choices lie ahead.

== Production ==
Wolfblood was created after series creator Debbie Moon, during a visit to a bookshop, saw the words "wolf" in one book title and "blood" in another and blended them together. The series was commissioned after the BBC Writersroom website announced an open call for children's drama scripts. Moon was among eight writers taken to a conference centre in Kent, and, after a few days of intensive development, it became one of two new original children's dramas to be commissioned by CBBC. The series was filmed in the north-east of England by the same crew who filmed Tracy Beaker Returns. Early series filming locations included Hookergate School and the woods of the surrounding Rowlands Gill countryside, from series 4 onwards the filming moved to at Heworth Grange Comprehensive in East Gateshead (Hawthorn Comprehensive in the series) and the areas around Windy Nook and Newcastle.

Production for series 1 began in February 2012 and ran until May 2012. It was shot in 3 production blocks: episodes 1–4, episodes 5–8, and episodes 9–13. A second series was confirmed after the final episode of the first series had aired. Filming for the second series began February 2013 and ended May 2013. All of the directors were new to the series, and it was shot in four production blocks: episodes 1–4, episodes 5–8, episode 9, and episodes 10–13. Filming for the third series began in February 2014 and ended in May 2014 and the series aired from 15 September until 27 October 2014.

== Home media ==
All five series are available on DVD in the United Kingdom, United States, Australia, and Germany (the latter has also released the series in Blu-ray format). They are also available in many other countries via Amazon and other online retailers.

== Awards and nominations ==
Year	Award	Category	Nominee(s)	Result
2013	British Academy Children's Awards	Children's BAFTA Kids' Vote - Television	Wolfblood	Nominated
2013	British Academy Children's Awards	Children's Performer	Aimee Kelly (Maddy Smith)	Nominated
2013	British Academy Children's Awards	Children's Performer	Bobby Lockwood (Rhydian Morris)	Won
2013	British Academy Children's Awards	Children's Drama	Production Team	Nominated
2013	British Academy Children's Awards	Children's Writer	Debbie Moon	Nominated
2013	Royal Television Society Awards	Children's Drama	Wolfblood	Won
2013	Royal Television Society Awards	Best Drama Production	Wolfblood	Nominated
2013	Banff Rockie Awards	Best Children Programs Fiction	Wolfblood	Won
2014	British Academy Children's Awards	Children's BAFTA Kids' Vote - Television	Wolfblood	Nominated
2014	British Academy Children's Awards	Children's Drama	Debbie Moon, Matthew Evans, and Foz Allan	Nominated
2014	British Academy Children's Awards	Children's Writer	Debbie Moon	Won
2014	Royal Television Society Awards	Children's Fiction	Wolfblood	Nominated
2014	Broadcast Awards	Best Children's Programme	Wolfblood	Nominated
2015	British Academy Children's Awards	Children's BAFTA Kids' Vote - Television	Wolfblood	Nominated
2015	British Academy Children's Awards	Children's Drama	Debbie Moon, Jonathan Wolfman, and Sallie Aprahamian	Nominated
2015	British Screenwriters' Awards	Best British Children's Television	Wolfblood	Won
2016	Royal Television Society Awards	Best Drama (Below £600k)	Wolfblood	Nominated
2016	British Academy Children's Awards	Children's Performer	Leona Vaughan	Nominated

== Spin-off ==
The second series was accompanied by a 10 part wildlife spin-off series exploring wolves, hosted by Bobby Lockwood. This has been produced by the BBC Natural History Unit, entitled Wolfblood Uncovered; it began airing on 9 September 2013. Wolfblood Uncovered compares scenes in Wolfblood with facts about real wolves, and points out how wolf behavior is reflected in the actions of the characters in the story, such as living in packs, defending territory against rivals, fear of fire and enclosed spaces, reliance on sense of smell and a carnivorous diet. There are also a series of shorts called Wolfblood Secrets that aired in 2017, interviews about the wolfbloods in an interrogation room setting with the various characters about wolfbloods.

== See also ==
- H_{2}O: Just Add Water
- Mako: Island of Secrets
- Naagin
