= List of Millie Inbetween episodes =

The following list consists of episodes from the CBBC children's sitcom Millie inbetween.

== Series overview ==
| Series | Episodes | Originally released | |
| Series | Episodes | First released | Last released |
|---|---|---|---|
| 1 | 13 | 26 September 2014 | 17 December 2014 |
| 2 | 15 | 19 November 2015 | 5 April 2016 |
| 3 | 12 | 20 December 2016 | 14 March 2017 |
| 4 | 12 | 1 January 2018 | 16 March 2018 |
| 5 | 3 | 10 December 2018 | 12 December 2018 |

== Episodes ==
=== Series 1 (2014) ===
| No. overall | No. in series | Title | Directed by | Written by | Original release date |
|---|---|---|---|---|---|
| 1 | 1 | "Surprise Party" | Fraser MacDonald | Gary Parker | 26 September 2014 |
It is Lauren's birthday and she tells her sister Millie that all she wants for a present is for their mum and dad to get back together, but it turns out that Sharon has been dating her personal trainer, Mike. First appearances of: Millie Innes as Millie, Tallulah Greive as Lauren, Hannah Jane Fox as Sharon, James Bachman as Tony and Jeremy Edwards as Mike
| 2 | 2 | "Double Date" | Fraser MacDonald | Max Allen | 3 October 2014 |
Lauren and Millie try to coax a reluctant Tony back onto the dating scene, but the first date that he picks is just like Sharon. Sharon tries too hard to impress her new boyfriend, and gets in a personal trainer to help her get in shape for the 10K run (that she lied about being able to do).
| 3 | 3 | "The Babysitter" | Fraser MacDonald | Gary Parker | 10 October 2014 |
Sharon and Mike leave Craig in charge of the girls when their usual babysitter cancels, and he quickly shows them who is in charge. Sharon and Mike have dinner at a restaurant - but Tony brings his date Amber to the same place. Will it end in disaster? First appearances of: Theo Stevenson as Craig Taylor and Jaye Jacobs as Amber
| 4 | 4 | "Bigging Up Dad" | Fraser MacDonald | Gary Parker | 17 October 2014 |
Tony has a date with Amber, who the girls think is way out of his league - so they decide to give him a makeover. But it turns out that Amber likes him for who he truly is. Meanwhile, Craig makes Sharon's plan to create a new sausage sensation even better.
| 5 | 5 | "Trick or Treat" | Fraser MacDonald | Gary Parker | 30 October 2015 |
Amber brings her kids (Fran and Jake) over to Tony's to meet the girls on Halloween, and things are more frosty than spooky - especially when Jake destroys Millie's costume. Fran covers for Jake, and tells Millie she did it - but will the truth unfold? Note: This is the only episode for the second series, not the first. First appearances of: Mya-Lecia Naylor as Fran and Marley Lockhart as Jake
| 6 | 6 | "Moving Day" | Fraser MacDonald | Gary Parker | 24 October 2014 |
Millie has to give up her bedroom when Mike and Craig move in. Lauren goes over to Tony's for peace and quiet - only to find that midwife Amber has brought a patient home with her. The patient (Chloe) ends up having her baby in the flat - but Lauren is pleased that she can finally get an A in her biology homework.
| 7 | 7 | "Staycation" | Fraser MacDonald | Bronagh Taggart | 31 October 2014 |
Millie overhears Sharon and Mike discussing a holiday in France, and plans an invitation for herself and Lauren. She ends up playing her parents off against each other in the vacation stakes; but ends up with a disappointing result for herself, her sister and Craig when the French holiday does not turn out how Millie and Lauren expected.
| 8 | 8 | "Boy Band" | Fraser MacDonald | Jessica Silcock & Naomi Smith | 7 November 2014 |
Lauren's favourite band (The Temper Hearts) are playing a secret gig, so she abandons her previous cinema-going plans with Millie in favour of seeing them. Lauren infects Amber with the Temper Hearts Fever, and Millie, and Tony, who is upset because he didn't get a date with Amber, try to stop it. Lauren isn't allowed into the gig, but Millie fixes it with her plan.
| 9 | 9 | "Mobile Wars" | Angie de Chastelai Smith | Joseph Lidster | 14 November 2014 |
Lauren's new smartphone is driving everyone mad, but the device goes missing after Mike finally confiscates it. Millie is accused of stealing the phone, and must prove her innocence.
| 10 | 10 | "Baby Brain" | Fraser MacDonald | Gary Parker | 21 December 2014 |
Sharon is buying a cot, researching baby names and calling nurseries. Millie, Lauren and Craig believe she is pregnant - and the truth must be revealed. It turns out that the doctor's appointment was for Sharon's ingrown toenails!
| 11 | 11 | "Bermuda Calling" | Fraser MacDonald | Gary Parker | 28 December 2014 |
Mike successfully applies for a year's contract job in Bermuda - but Millie doesn't seem too pleased. As Craig schemes to keep the girls from ruining his dream year in paradise, Millie realises she can't hide her doubts - and announces at the eleventh hour that she doesn't want to go.
| 12 | 12 | "A Different Christmas" | Fraser MacDonald | Holly Phillips | 17 December 2014 |
It is Millie and Lauren's first Christmas since the separation, and for Millie it is the chance for a fresh start - for once, a Christmas without family arguments. She persuades everyone to leave their past Christmases behind, and invents new traditions for the family. Some people struggle with it - especially Lauren, who wants everything to be like it was. Final Appearance of: James Bachman as Tony
| 13 | 13 | "Access All Areas" | Fraser MacDonald | N/A | 5 December 2014 |
Special behind the scenes documentary about the making of the show. Millie Innes looks back over the series and recalls the highlights with help from actors Tallulah Greive (Lauren) and Theo Stevenson (Craig). She chooses her favourite scenes for each of the characters and explains a bit more about the actors who play them. The kids then take the viewers behind the scenes, giving insight into the highs and lows of their experiences. Note: In the episode, this was titled "Millie & Friends" not "Access All Areas".

=== Series 2 (2015–16) ===
| No. overall | No. in series | Title | Directed by | Written by | Original release date |
|---|---|---|---|---|---|
| 14 | 1 | "Gloria" | Angie de Chastelai Smith | Max Allen | 5 January 2016 |
An unexpected visit from great aunt Gloria - Sharon's harshest critic - means emergency plans are needed. Sharon has never told her about her and Tony splitting up. Millie tells Sharon this is the perfect opportunity to come clean and tell the truth, but Sharon loses her nerve - and even Tony arrives to help. First appearance of: Richard Lumsden as Tony
| 16 | 2 | "Surprise, Surprise" | Angie de Chastelai Smith | Gary Parker | 12 January 2016 |
It's Millie's 13th birthday - a teenager at last! Both her mum and dad want to throw a party for her, but Millie can't decide which she'd rather have - mum and Lauren's teen disco party, or dad's more old school cake-and-games version. What kind of teenager does she want to be? And why does she have to decide? The result is two rival parties in different rooms - and Millie realises she's going to have to do something. To make things worse, Craig accidentally creates an 'open' invitation to Millie's party - and only Lauren stands between the front door and a full-on teen invasion.
| 17 | 3 | "Take a Hike" | Angie de Chastelai Smith | Elly Brewer | 19 January 2016 |
Lauren signs up for the school hike but gives up after stressful training sessions with Mike. Will Millie be able to change Lauren's mind before it is too late?
| 18 | 4 | "Head to Head" | Angie de Chastelai Smith | Paul Rose | 26 January 2016 |
The school is holding a spelling bee and Millie enters, hoping it'll mean more attention from Tony. But Fran also decides to give it a go. Tony and Amber promise not to take sides, but it's no good - it soon turns into a gruelling showdown between competitive parents, as they coach their kids in spellings from aardvark to zoology. This is not the sort of attention Millie wanted! She and Fran are forced to join forces - but how can they lose the spelling bee without disappointing both their parents? Craig's new saturday job at Sunnyshopper brings him ridicule from Lauren - until she realises there are upsides too.
| 19 | 5 | "Craig Come Home" | Angie de Chastelai Smith | Gary Parker | 17 December 2015 |
It's Christmas - a time for the family to be together. But Craig, sick of being constantly criticised, decides to move back to his mum's for a while. Mike is bereft, but it's a victory for the girls - at last, no Craig! But when they start to squabble and fall out, they realise the family dynamic is all wrong without him. They actually miss Craig - and they have to get him back for Christmas! Over at Tony's, it's a cramped Christmas - so Fran and Amber embark on a mission to convince Tony his flat is too small.
| 20 | 6 | "The Guitar Hero" | Diarmuid Goggins | Bronagh Taggart | 2 February 2016 |
Millie is looking forward to going ice skating and getting some rare one-on-one time with her dad. Jake's feeling the same - his own dad is putting in an all-too-rare appearance to take him to the air guitar championships. But Amber and Fran know how unreliable he is, and they're proved right when he lets Jake down at the last minute. Jake's gutted, and Tony is torn - should he step in, even though it means letting Millie down, again? Craig and Lauren, meanwhile, are desperate to meet their heroes at a comics convention - and there's a single ticket up for grabs...
| 21 | 7 | "Mum v Mum" | Diarmuid Goggins | Joseph Lidster | 9 February 2016 |
Overhearing Millie describe her as 'uncool', Sharon decides it's time to change. She can be cool - right? Wrong - very, very wrong! The results are epically embarrassing for Millie and Lauren. Jake and Fran have the opposite problem - Amber is so laid-back she's horizontal, and they're fed up of living with the chaotic consequences. Millie and Fran realise they can help each other - invite Sharon round to dinner at Amber's so both can see what the reality is like. It's a great idea in theory - if only Amber hadn't just decided to be as super-organised as Sharon. Lauren stays at home, but is soon bored. Craig's happy to let her have a go at his computer game - until she starts beating his high score.
| 22 | 8 | "So Long Sunnyshopper" | Diarmuid Goggins | Gary Parker | 16 February 2016 |
When Sharon is made redundant from her job at Sunnyshopper, the family are supportive - until she starts a regime of frenzied over-tidying. Millie realises Sharon is bored and frustrated, so suggests something positive - why not start her own business? Sharon loves the idea - but what can she make? The family brainstorm - and the hunt is on to find a product that works. Tony's got money problems of his own - sort of. He's had an unexpected tax refund, and the only question is - what should he splurge it on?
| 23 | 9 | "Meatballs" | Diarmuid Goggins | Holly Phillips | 23 February 2016 |
It's parents' evening, but Millie is desperate to prevent Sharon and Tony seeing her English teacher, Miss Knope. She turns to Lauren for help, and her scheming sister soon finds out the reason: Millie has written a story about the night Sharon and Tony split up, and Miss Knope wants to enter it in a competition. Millie is horrified at thought of it being shared - especially with Sharon and Tony. With Lauren's help, the meeting is avoided - but Miss Knope wants to know why her star pupil was a no-show... Fran is having the same problem in reverse: how can she persuade a reluctant Amber to go to parents' evening? Tony comes to the rescue.
| 24 | 10 | "Loved Up" | Diarmuid Goggins | Paul Rose | 1 March 2016 |
Lauren is smitten with Craig's friend Justin. Millie's seen it all before, but this time it's worse - her sister's fallen harder and further than ever! Something about Justin rings alarm bells for Millie, and her instincts are proved right when she finds out he's been using Craig to get to Lauren - and he's using Lauren, too. But nothing Millie or Craig say will get through - Lauren is hopelessly besotted. With Fran's help, Millie turns detective. Meanwhile, Tony realises Jake is growing up - but he misses their silly games, and realises something is up.
| 25 | 11 | "A Bump in the Road" | Dez McCarthy | Gary Parker | 8 March 2016 |
Tired, stressed and living in each other's pockets, Tony and Amber realise they need some space - so decide to take a break from their relationship. The kids are gutted, but determined that their own friendships will survive. Their efforts to stay in touch bring Tony and Amber into contact - and their frosty relationship starts to thaw. But it gets stuck in the worst possible place - the dreaded friend zone. Getting them past that is the kids' biggest challenge yet. Sharon has problems of her own when she decides slacker Craig needs a hobby. It's a good idea - but she soon regrets it when he takes up the drums.
| 26 | 12 | "Brothers in Arms" | Dez McCarthy | Will Ing | 15 March 2016 |
Tony and Amber are back together - and Amber's moving in. It's only temporary, until they find a bigger place, but the resulting chaos drives Millie, Lauren, Fran and Jake round to Sharon's. And Millie has an ulterior motive - getting Craig to look after the hyperactive Jake as revenge for his annoying behaviour. She thinks it'll teach him to be a better brother - but Jake thinks Craig is pretty cool as he is, and starts imitating his teenage ways. Back in the confusion of the crowded flat, Tony's new website is bringing in lots of work, but his Post-it-based filing system has a major weakness: gusts of wind.
| 27 | 13 | "Fools Rush In" | Dez McCarthy | Gary Parker | 22 March 2016 |
Mike tells a horrified Craig that he's planning to ask Sharon to marry him. Craig joins forces with Lauren to prevent it - they know what happens when this goes wrong, and they don't want Mike and Sharon rushing into another disaster. Despite their efforts to ruin the romantic atmosphere, Mike pops the question - and Sharon says yes. Millie's the only one who thinks it'll be fine - but sees what they mean when she's asked out on a date herself. It upsets the happy status quo of her group of friends - and she falls out with Fran. Now she feels the same as Lauren and Craig about the wedding - but Mike is already making plans for the big day.
| 28 | 14 | "Out of the Woods" | Dez McCarthy | Holly Phillips | 29 March 2016 |
It's half term and Millie persuades both sides of the family to go on a joint camping holiday. She's worried that sparks will fly among the adults - but they get on fine, and instead, it's the kids who fall out. Trying to keep the two factions happy means she's Millie Inbetween yet again. When her plan for a woodland trek fails to unite them, she decides to stage being lost in the woods, so they'll work together to find her. It's the perfect plan - until she realizes she really is lost!

=== Special (2016) ===
| No. overall | No. in series | Title | Directed by | Original release date |
|---|---|---|---|---|
| 29 | 15 | "A Day in the Life of Millie Inbetween" | Dez McCarthy | 5 April 2016 |
A look behind the scenes to see how the show is made. We meet the cast and crew on a typical day to see how the series comes together. Ever wondered if Millie and the gang go to school while we are shooting? Who does Millie's make-up? Or who's the funniest cast member? All these questions, and more, will be answered in this behind-the-scenes special.

=== Series 3 (2016–17) ===
| No. overall | No. in series | Title | Directed by | Written by | Original release date |
|---|---|---|---|---|---|
| 30 | 1 | "Dad's New Flat" | Angie de Chastelai Smith | Gary Parker | 3 January 2017 |
Tony, Amber and co move into a bigger flat - with an extra bedroom. But when Fran, Jake and the girls clash over who will have the new room, Millie and Lauren feel pushed out and decide the answer is to stay permanently at Sharon's house. The fragile equilibrium goes haywire. Tony thinks he's done the wrong thing, Fran misses having them around, and Craig doesn't want them always there. Finally Tony is made to realise that the girls' real worry is that he's choosing his new family over them - and at last, they can work out a new plan. Back at Sharon's, Craig has a new mate, Trey. Mike can't help embarrassing Craig by being epically uncool - until he impresses Trey with his judo moves.
| 31 | 2 | "Millie Goes Bad" | Angie de Chastelai Smith | Gary Parker | 10 January 2017 |
Millie is invited to a wild-sounding party, but her mum won't let her go. Fed up with being 'the sensible one' Millie responds by going bad. But despite expert tutoring from Lauren and Craig - she ends up being grounded. Time to raise her game and go really bad. It's Millie v Sharon - who will prevail? Fran is also invited to the party, but despite getting Amber's permission, she doesn't want to go, until Millie tells her that a certain Liam is going to be there.
| 32 | 3 | "Hey Baby" | Angie de Chastelai Smith | Paul Rose | 17 January 2017 |
Amber has some huge news - she's pregnant. But when Tony fumbles the announcement, Millie isn't over the moon. Will Tony still have time in his life for them? He promises he will, but Millie enlists Lauren's help to put him to the test, and they devise ways to demand his attention. Tony is exhausted, but can't back down - he has to stick to his promise. The girls eventually come to realise the difference between him having enough time for them and enough love. Craig, meanwhile, is walking on air - he's in love and he intends to declare it by reciting his poetry to the girl in question in front of the whole school. He has to be stopped!
| 33 | 4 | "Dream Christmas" | Terry Loane | Paul Rose | 20 December 2016 |
The girls are spending Christmas at Tony's. Millie reveals to Lauren how sad she is that their dad's parents don’t come and visit them any more - they haven’t seen them since their grandparents moved to America, after their mum and dad split up. So when the doorbell rings on Christmas morning, the last thing Millie is expecting is her grandparents to arrive . Especially when the visit turns out to be a bit more complicated than she thought. Sharon, Mike and Craig also have an unexpected Christmas guest - Sharon's nephew Ollie. When Sharon forbids the eating of any Christmas grub till the girls are back from Tony's, Ollie's not having it... and he persuades Craig to go along with his plan.
| 34 | 5 | "Mum's The Word" | Terry Loane | Max Allen | 24 January 2017 |
Something seems wrong with Mike - and Millie discovers that he's lost his job at the gym but he's too depressed to tell Sharon. As Millie and Lauren - mostly Millie - were partly to blame, they take it on themselves to find him a new job. Millie says she will break the news to Sharon, especially as Mike hasn't booked the spa break Sharon is really looking forward to. It turns out that isn't easy to do. Can the girls find Mike a new job before Sharon finds out the truth? Over at Tony's, Mike is temporarily hired to teach Tony self defence. It's not working for Tony but Fran and Jake are loving it. First appearance of: Natasha Wisniewska (Samuel Kift's cousin)
| 35 | 6 | "The Future is Now" | Terry Loane | Bronagh Taggart | 31 January 2017 |
Millie has to choose her next-level school subjects, and it's proving impossible - why does she have to decide now what she wants to be? She needs to talk to her mum - but Lauren isn't helping. Her melodramatic flouncing over her mock exams means Millie can't get the time with her mum that she needs. In order to support Amber, Tony has taken a full-time job that really doesn't suit him. Fran and Jake have to do something - before he makes the ultimate sacrifice and shaves off his beard.
| 36 | 7 | "Millie in the Mirror" | Terry Loane | Gary Parker | 7 February 2017 |
When a new frontman joins Craig's band, Craig is told he needs to buff up and look the part - or he's out. Before getting the part to play at the Laurens prom. Lauren is stressing about whether her looks will please her date for the school prom, and Millie doesn't know what to wear for No Uniform Day - she hates the idea of everyone judging her! Everyone is feeling insecure about their appearance, and Fran's no help - if anything, she seems too confident, defying Amber by wearing her temporary tattoo to school, and inspiring Jake to do the same. Millie helps Craig get his self-confidence back - but what can she do about her own?
| 37 | 8 | "Breakfast in Bed" | Angie de Chastelai Smith | Max Allen | 21 February 2017 |
Millie and Lauren compete to give Tony the best Father's Day, like they do every year. But when Lauren raises the stakes by getting a card for Mike, it's game on - who can show they care for their stepdad the most? Fran and Jake's own father arrives with news that he's moved into the area, and they can spend much more time with him from now on. Jake loves the idea - but Fran is mistrustful as ever. Will his promises prove to be empty again?
| 38 | 9 | "Take the High Road" | Dez McCarthy | Bronagh Taggart | 28 February 2017 |
Determined to win the school's big Eco Challenge, Millie goes green and insists the whole family make do without the internet for a week. Mike's not hard to persuade, so off goes the WiFi! Craig and Lauren are livid, and join forces to out-green Millie until she cracks: no hot water, no lights, no heating. Tony is cynical about Millie's chances of changing the world, and when Fran finds out why, she takes him on a journey into his own past. When Millie's favourite band release their new video exclusively online, she's caught in her own green trap, and Craig and Lauren relish seeing the tables turned.
| 39 | 10 | "Playdate" | Dez McCarthy | Kay Stonham | 7 March 2017 |
Sharon and Mike plan a half-term caravan holiday, but the kids rebel - they want to spend time away from the grown-ups. So when the holiday is cancelled, they find Sharon and Mike getting under their feet. It seems the parental tables have turned - so Millie arranges a 'playdate' for them over at Tony and Amber's. Surprisingly, they get on great and a full-on karaoke party follows. Alone at last, Millie, Lauren and Craig can get on with what they want to. But can they manage as well as they think in a parent-free world - especially when a huge storm is brewing..?
| 40 | 11 | "Valentine's Day" | Dez McCarthy | Mark Evans | 14 February 2017 |
Lauren is completely loved-up and ignoring Millie. Missing her sister's attention, Millie pretends she's had a valentine from a new boyfriend. Eventually she is forced to invite the made-up Grant round to tea the next day. Naturally enough, the entire family want to meet this wonderful-sounding boy. Meanwhile, Craig impresses Fran when he sticks up for Jake - and soon she's got hearts in her eyes too, to Millie and Lauren's horror. Do they need to stage an intervention - or will Craig put her off without their help?
| 41 | 12 | "The Big Day" | Dez McCarthy | Gary Parker | 14 March 2017 |
When she realises it's finally time Sharon and Mike got married, Millie persuades Lauren and Craig they should 'propose' to them. It's a yes - and full steam ahead to the wedding! But the only available slot is just days away, and there's almost no time to iron out the details. Has Millie made the biggest mistake of her life? Even Tony and Amber are invited, and Tony's going to make a speech (written by Millie, just to be on the safe side). It looks like they've pulled it out of the bag and romance has won the day - but then Amber goes into labour at precisely the wrong moment. Final regular appearances of: Richard Lumsden as Tony, Jaye Jacobs as Amber

=== Series 4 (2017–18) ===
| No. overall | No. in series | Title | Directed by | Written by | Original release date |
|---|---|---|---|---|---|
| 42 | 1 | "Back to the Future" | Dez McCarthy | Max Allen | 1 January 2018 |
It's New Year's Eve. Millie is stuck in the loft, Craig's been humiliated as a DJ, and the whole family are upset because they think they've missed the midnight moment - but have they? First appearance of: Richard Wisker as Declan Final regular appearance of: Theo Stevenson as Craig and Natasha Wisniewska (Samuel Kift's cousin)
| 43 | 2 | "Friend Friction" | Dez McCarthy | Gary Parker | 5 January 2018 |
Millie is missing her dad. Fran is missing her mum. Millie seeks a new friend and is unaware how much she is hurting Fran, Jake and potential buddy, Jessie, in the process. First appearance of: Rhianna Merrells as Jessie
| 44 | 3 | "Room for a Lion" | Dez McCarthy | Gary Parker | 12 January 2018 |
Confident cousin Leo moves into Craig's old room. Lauren tries to bring him down and Millie tries to rescue him. Flora excels at Jake's game. First appearance of: Oscar Morgan as Leo
| 45 | 4 | "Lauren Deleted" | Dez McCarthy | Gary Parker | 19 January 2018 |
Lauren's social media is dangerously out of hand. With Millie's help she deletes herself, but craves what she's missing, until she finds photography. Jake tries to help another dancer. Note: This episode featured bloopers during the ending credits.
| 46 | 5 | "Millie Makes Peace" | Dez McCarthy | Mark Evans | 26 January 2018 |
Millie is afraid that Sharon and Mike arguing means they'll split up. She sets herself up as peacemaker for them and Fran and Jake too, but she learns that arguments can clear the air. Note: This episode featured bloopers during the ending credits.
| 47 | 6 | "Off the Rails" | Angie de Chastelai Smith | Gary Parker | 2 February 2018 |
Jessie is hinting that there's trouble at home, so Millie draws on her own experience to help. They are due to dance at the school show when Jessie goes on the rampage.
| 48 | 7 | "Take My Advice" | Angie de Chastelai Smith | Chris Reddy | 9 February 2018 |
Millie is anonymously blogging advice to school parents. Sharon writes in and eventually realises it is Millie. Fran is caught in the middle and Leo tries to teach Declan to be cool.
| 49 | 8 | "Best Actress Goes to..." | Simon Hynd | Bronagh Taggart | 16 February 2018 |
There is family drama as Leo is cast as Juliet and Lauren as the Friar. The girls realise they need to help Leo find his inner Juliet. Mike's building a go-kart, but needs Fran's help.
| 50 | 9 | "The Camera Never Lies" | Simon Hynd | Paul Rose | 23 February 2018 |
Lauren's confidence takes a knock when she's turned down for a photography course. Millie boosts her but the results are uncomfortable. Flora's birthday gift tests Fran and Jake.
| 51 | 10 | "Exchange Partners" | Simon Hynd | Max Allen | 2 March 2018 |
Exchange student Catalina is unhappy. The family try to cheer her up to no avail. Millie and Fran double date with Javier and Ollie but events take a turn in an unexpected way.
| 52 | 11 | "Survival Surveillance" | Angie de Chastelai Smith | Bronagh Taggart | 9 March 2018 |
Sharon and Mike are persuaded to accept a weekend wedding invite. The kids and Ollie promise to be responsible adults, but is the trust misplaced? Fran thinks Franma is online dating.
| 53 | 12 | "Making Plans for Millie" | Simon Hynd | Matthew Leys | 16 March 2018 |
Lauren and Leo are packing up to leave, Tony and Sharon are separately and enthusiastically planning the summer for Millie, but should she apply for what she really wants to do? Final appearance of: Oscar Morgan as Leo

=== Series 5 Specials (2018) ===
| No. overall | No. in series | Title | Directed by | Written by | Original release date |
|---|---|---|---|---|---|
| 54 | 1 | "Promises, Promises" | Ben Gosling Fuller | Gary Parker | 10 December 2018 |
Lauren and Craig return home to celebrate Sharon and Mike's wedding anniversary, but when Declan drops a romantic bombshell on Lauren and Tony drops an explosive one on Mille, everyone's future is turned upside down and Millie plans a trip to Spain. Return: Theo Stevenson as Craig
| 55 | 2 | "The Rain is Spain" | Ben Gosling Fuller | Matthew Leys | 11 December 2018 |
Millie goes to Spain to convince Tony he should come home and Craig insists on going with her to pursue his DJ career. Will they succeed in their mission?
| 56 | 3 | "Coming Home" | Ben Gosling Fuller | Gary Parker | 12 December 2018 |
Craig tries to convince Millie that Spain really suits her dad, but Millie has dug herself a pretty deep hole and together they have to race against time to keep her dad's job.
