= List of former British child actors =

This is a list of former child actors from the United Kingdom. These actors were aged seventeen or less at the time they started acting but are currently eighteen or over. The list also includes deceased child actors. Films and/or TV series they appeared in are mentioned only if they were still a child at the time of filming. For a list of current child actors from the UK see List of current British child actors.

== A ==
- Zaraah Abrahams (born 1987)
- Jenny Agutter (born 1952)
- Qasim Akhtar (born 1991)
- Eubha Akilade (born 1998)
- Benjamin Evan Ainsworth (born 2008)
- James Alexandrou (born 1985)
- John Alford (born 1981)
- Isabelle Allen (born 2002)
- Teddie Allen (born 2006)
- India Amarteifio (born 2001)
- Jasmine Armfield (born 1998)
- George Armstrong (1962-2023)
- Devon Anderson (born 1987)
- Julie Andrews (born 1935)
- Louis Ashbourne Serkis (born 2004)
- Jane Asher (born 1946)
- Peter Asher (born 1944)
- Joe Ashman (born 1995)
- Lily-Rose Aslandogdu (born 2003)
- Lilly Aspell (born 2007)
- Sam Aston (born 1993)
- Michael Audreson (born 1956)
- Afshan Azad (born 1988)

== B ==
- Angela Baddeley (1904–1976)
- Gillian Bailey (born 1955)
- Jonathan Bailey (born 1988)
- Alex Bain (born 2001)
- Christian Bale (born 1974)
- Manpreet Bambra (born 1992)
- Asha Banks (born 2003)
- Jessica Barden (born 1992)
- Archie Barnes (born 2006)
- Ruby Barnhill (born 2004)
- Billy Barratt (born 2007)
- Mischa Barton (born 1986)
- Matthew Beard (born 1989)
- Charlotte Beaumont (born 1995)
- Christopher Beeny (1941–2020)
- Jamie Bell (born 1986)
- Eliza Bennett (born 1992)
- Finn Bennett (born 1999)
- Johnny Bennett (born 1998)
- Pippa Bennett-Warner (born 1988)
- Perry Benson (born 1961)
- Rosie Bentham (born 2001)
- Master Betty (1791–1874)
- Sean Biggerstaff (born 1983)
- Harley Bird (born 2001)
- Gemma Bissix (born 1983)
- Chris Bisson (born 1975)
- Niamh Blackshaw (born 1999)
- Isabella Blake-Thomas (born 2002)
- Lola Blue (born 2005)
- Tom Blyth (born 1995)
- Holly Bodimeade (born 1995)
- Josh Bolt (born 1994)
- Jamie Borthwick (born 1994)
- Samuel Bottomley (born 2001)
- Hollie-Jay Bowes (born 1989)
- Isa Bowman (1874–1958)
- Lucy Boynton (born 1994)
- Dai Bradley (as David Bradley) (born 1953)
- Lindy Brill (born 1963)
- Thomas Brodie-Sangster (born 1990)
- Charlie Brooks (born 1981)
- Josh Brown (born 1990)
- Millie Bobby Brown (born 2004)
- Céline Buckens (born 1996)
- Emily Burnett (born 1997)
- Asa Butterfield (born 1997)
- Scarlett Byrne (born 1990)
- Hetti Bywater (born 1994)

== C ==
- Rhys Cadman (born 1998)
- Daisy Campbell (born 2003)
- Emily Carey (born 2003)
- Sally Carman (born 1981)
- Todd Carty (born 1963)
- Grace Cassidy (born 1993)
- Natalie Cassidy (born 1983)
- Raffey Cassidy (born 2001)
- Earl Cave (born 2000)
- Sheila Chandra (born 1965)
- Raffiella Chapman (born 2007)
- Keith Chegwin (1957–2017)
- Juhaim Rasul Choudhury (born 2005)
- Navin Chowdhry (born 1971)
- Shefali Chowdhury (born 1988)
- Kacey Clarke (born 1988)
- Barney Clark (born 1993)
- John Clark (1932-2023)
- Petula Clark (born 1932)
- Alfie Clarke (born 2007)
- Amelia Clarkson (born 1997)
- Klariza Clayton (born 1989)
- Nicholas Cochrane (born 1973)
- Julie Dawn Cole (born 1957)
- Steven Cole (born 1982)
- Charlotte Coleman (1968-2001)
- Raphaël Coleman (1994–2020)
- Harry Collett (born 2004)
- Jodie Comer (born 1993)
- Charlie Condou (born 1973)
- Kelly Condron (born 1982)
- Kit Connor (born 2004)
- Sebastian Croft (born 2001)
- Amelia Crouch (born 2004)
- Abigail Cruttenden (born 1968)

== D ==
- Olivia d'Abo (born 1969)
- Ellie Dadd (born 2005)
- Ellie Darcey-Alden (born 1999)
- Eileen Davies (born 1948)
- John Howard Davies (1939-2011)
- Robin Davies (1954–2010)
- Ruth Davies (born 1965)
- Roman Griffin Davis (born 2007)
- Warwick Davis (born 1970)
- Ashley Taylor Dawson (born 1982)
- Daniel Day-Lewis (born 1957)
- Fern Deacon (born 1998)
- Jack Deam (born 1972)
- Letitia Dean (born 1967)
- Cleo Demetriou (born 2001)
- Richard Dempsey (born 1973)
- Daniela Denby-Ashe (born 1978)
- Sue Devaney (born 1967)
- Frank Dillane (born 1991)
- Declan Donnelly (born 1975)
- Karen Dotrice (born 1955)
- Tyger Drew-Honey (born 1996)
- Madeline Duggan (born 1994)
- Blair Dunlop (born 1992)
- Lesley Dunlop (born 1956)
- Phoebe Dynevor (born 1995)

== E ==
- Holly Earl (born 1992)
- Harry Eden (born 1990)
- Dixie Egerickx (born 2005)
- Jennifer Ellison (born 1983)
- Alfred Enoch (born 1988)
- Tallulah Evans (born 2000)

== F ==
- Otto Farrant (born 1996)
- Janina Faye (born 1948)
- Tom Felton (born 1987)
- Peter Firth (born 1953)
- Lorna Fitzgerald (born 1996)
- Emily Flain (born 2003)
- Amelia Flanagan (born 2008)
- Jamie Flatters (born 2000)
- Alexandra Fletcher (born 1976)
- Shannon Flynn (born 1996)
- Georgia May Foote (born 1991)
- Delanie Forbes (born 1976)
- India Fowler (born 2003)
- James Fox (born 1939)
- Jessica Fox (born 1983)
- Pamela Franklin (born 1950)
- William Franklyn-Miller (born 2004)
- Lynne Frederick (1954-1994)
- Nell Tiger Free (born 1999)
- Matilda Freeman (born 2004)
- Poppy Lee Friar (born 1995)
- Fiona Fullerton (born 1956)

== G ==
- Beau Gadsdon (born 2007)
- Charlotte Gainsbourg (born 1971)
- Matthew Garber (1956–1977)
- Michelle Gayle (born 1971)
- Samia Ghadie (born 1982)
- Millie Gibson (born 2004)
- Joseph Gilgun (born 1984)
- Simon Gipps-Kent (1958–1987)
- Oliver Golding (born 1993)
- Tylan Grant (born 2002)
- Jan Graveson (born 1965)
- Simon Gregson (born 1974)
- Tallulah Greive (born 1997)
- Ciarán Griffiths (born 1983)
- Josie Griffiths (born 2000)
- Rupert Grint (born 1988)
- Georgia Groome (born 1992)

== H ==
- Chelsea Halfpenny (born 1991)
- Jill Halfpenny (born 1975)
- Adrian Hall (born 1959)
- Alan Halsall (born 1982)
- Susan Hampshire (born 1937)
- Dani Harmer (born 1989)
- John Hasler (born 1974)
- Keeley Hawes (born 1976)
- Chloe Hawthorn (born 2002)
- Austin Haynes (born 2008)
- David Hemmings (1941–2003)
- Isaac Hempstead Wright (born 1999)
- Georgie Henley (born 1995)
- Jessica Henwick (born 1992)
- Joshua Herdman (born 1987)
- Alice Hewkin (born 1995)
- Amy-Leigh Hickman (born 1997)
- Freddie Highmore (born 1992)
- Katie Hill (born 2003)
- Hannah Hobley (born 1988)
- Isabel Hodgins (born 1993)
- Tom Holland (born 1996)
- Jack Hollington (born 2001)
- Ellis Hollins (born 1999)
- Nicholas Hoult (born 1989)
- Callum Scott Howells (born 1999)
- Florence Hunt (born 2007)
- Rachel Hurd-Wood (born 1990)
- Lucy Hutchinson (born 2003)
- Tracy Hyde (born 1959)
- Louis Hynes (born 2001)

== I ==
- Kerry Ingram (born 1999)
- Millie Innes (born 2000)

== J ==
- Robbie Jarvis (born 1986)
- Scarlett Alice Johnson (born 1985)
- Charlie Jones (born 1996)
- Emilia Jones (born 2002)
- Felicity Jones (born 1983)
- Charlotte Jordan (born 1994)
- Elliott Jordan (born 1983)
- Samuel Joslin (born 2002)
- Jacqueline Jossa (born 1992)
- Megan Jossa (born 1996)
- Noah Jupe (born 2005)

== K ==
- Brad Kavanagh (born 1992)
- Robbie Kay (born 1995)
- Gillian Kearney (born 1972)
- Mimi Keene (born 1998)
- Dafne Keen (born 2005)
- Tilly Keeper (born 1997)
- Sonny Kendall (born 2006)
- Oscar Kennedy (born 1999)
- Holly Kenny (born 1995)
- Skandar Keynes (born 1991)
- Honor Kneafsey (born 2004)
- Rosalind Knight (1933–2020)
- Tommy Knight (born 1993)
- Keira Knightley (born 1985)
- Andrew Knott (born 1979)
- Bobby Knutt (1945–2017)

== L ==
- Lily Laight (born 2001)
- Bleu Landau (born 2005)
- Bonnie Langford (born 1964)
- Jody Latham (born 1983)
- Lucien Laviscount (born 1992)
- Alex Lawther (born 1995)
- Ellie Leach (born 2001)
- Mark Lester (born 1958)
- Gabriella Leon (born 1996)
- Georgina Leonidas (born 1990)
- Katie Leung (born 1987)
- Matthew Lewis (born 1989)
- Dylan Llewellyn (born 1992)
- Georgia Lock (born 1996)
- Aisling Loftus (born 1990)
- James Lomas (born 1990)
- Jessica Lord (born 1998)
- Hannah Lowther (born 1997)

== M ==
- Kate Maberly (born 1982)
- Lee MacDonald (born 1968)
- Lewis MacDougall (born 2002)
- George MacKay (born 1992)
- Robert Madge (born 1996)
- George Maguire (born 1990)
- Holly Mai (born 1991)
- Angelica Mandy
- Ramona Marquez (born 2001)
- Sally Ann Matthews (born 1970)
- Bailey May (born 2002)
- Wilson Mbomio (born 2002)
- Jennie McAlpine (born 1984)
- Martine McCutcheon (born 1976)
- Roddy McDowall (1928–1998)
- Shona McGarty (born 1991)
- Mia McKenna-Bruce (born 1997)
- Jack McMullen (born 1991)
- Ant McPartlin (born 1975)
- Amanda Mealing (born 1967)
- Paul Medford (born 1967)
- Izzy Meikle-Small (born 1996)
- Harry Melling (born 1989)
- Ami Metcalf (born 1994)
- Sinead Michael (born 1998)
- Danny Miller (born 1991)
- Hayley Mills (born 1946)
- Juliet Mills (born 1941)
- Bill Milner (born 1995)
- Hugh Mitchell (born 1989)
- Ruaridh Mollica (born 1999)
- Isobelle Molloy (born 2000)
- Hannah Moncur (born 2004)
- David Morley (born 1965)
- John Moulder-Brown (born 1953)
- Liam Mower (born 1992)
- Elle Mulvaney (born 2002)
- Danny Murphy (born 2004)
- Erkan Mustafa (born 1970)

== N ==
- Rukku Nahar (born 1996)
- Mya-Lecia Naylor (2002–2019)
- Anthony Newley (1931–1999)
- Eve Newton (born 1998)
- Luke Newton (born 1997)
- Paul Nicholls (born 1979)
- Pheobe Nicholls (as Sarah Nicholls) (born 1957)
- Reece Noi (born 1988)

== O ==
- Tina O'Brien (born 1983)
- Cindy O'Callaghan (born 1956)
- Ruby O'Donnell (born 2000)
- Akai Osei (born 1999)

== P ==
- Regé-Jean Page (born 1988)
- Isabella Pappas (born 2002)
- Milo Parker (born 2002)
- Nico Parker (born 2004)
- Sacha Parkinson (born 1992)
- Louis Partridge (born 2003)
- Dev Patel (born 1990)
- Sarah Patterson (born 1970)
- Oaklee Pendergast (born 2004)
- Chris Perry-Metcalf (born 1989)
- Alex Pettyfer (born 1990)
- James Phelps (born 1986)
- Oliver Phelps (born 1986)
- Joe-Warren Plant (born 2002)
- Hugh Pollard (born 1975)
- Anna Popplewell (born 1988)
- Joseph Potter (born 1997/98)
- Will Poulter (born 1993)
- Bel Powley (born 1992)
- Billy Price (born 2000)
- Heydon Prowse (born 1981)
- Ella Purnell (born 1996)

== Q ==
- Holly Quin-Ankrah (born 1987)
- Ray Quinn (born 1988)

== R ==
- Daniel Radcliffe (born 1989)
- Tilly Ramsay (born 2001)
- Bella Ramsey (born 2003)
- Andrew Ray (1939-2003)
- Michel Ray (born 1944)
- Toby Regbo (born 1991)
- Sam Retford (born 1999)
- Jessica Revell (born 1994)
- Christopher Reynalds (born 1952)
- Dakota Blue Richards (born 1994)
- Aimee Richardson (born 1997)
- Heather Ripley (born 1959)
- Alexander James Rodriguez (born 2007)
- Alex Roe (born 1990)
- Laura Rollins (born 1988)
- Jemima Rooper (born 1981)
- Camilla and Rebecca Rosso (born 1994)
- Charlie Rowe (born 1996)
- William Rush (born 1994)
- Anna Rust (born 1995)
- Annie Russell (1864–1936)
- Gary Russell (born 1963)
- Debbie Russ (born 1960)
- Michelle Ryan (born 1984)
- Rebecca Ryan (born 1991)

== S ==
- Laura Sadler (1980–2003)
- Nathanael Saleh (born 2006)
- Nikki Sanderson (born 1984)
- Sunetra Sarker (born 1973)
- Gian Sammarco (born 1970)
- Thomas Sangster (born 1990)
- Edward Savage (born 1989)
- Jack Scanlon (born 1998)
- David Scarboro (1968–1988)
- Kaya Scodelario (born 1992)
- Jonathan Scott-Taylor (born 1998)
- George Sear (born 1997)
- Isabella Sermon (born 2006)
- Victoria Shalet (born 1981)
- Jack P. Shepherd (born 1988)
- Georgina Sherrington (born 1985)
- Adele Silva (born 1980)
- Sophie Simnett (born 1997)
- Joshua Sinclair-Evans (born 1995)
- Mimi Slinger (born 2003)
- Tamara Smart (born 2005)
- Colson Smith (born 1998)
- Maisie Smith (born 2001)
- Mia Smith (born 1994)
- Lindsey Stagg (born 1970)
- Nicola Stapleton (born 1974)
- Isobel Steele (born 2000)
- Harvey Spencer Stephens (born 1970)
- Oliver Stokes (born 1998)
- Ruby Stokes (born 2000)
- Sophie Stuckey (born 1991)
- Melissa Suffield (born 1992)
- Sara Sugarman (born 1962)
- Zak Sutcliffe (born 2001)
- Tom Sweet (born 2005)

== T ==
- Elizabeth Taylor (1932–2011) (English-born)
- Georgia Taylor (born 1980)
- Tom Taylor (born 2001)
- Eden Taylor-Draper (born 1997)
- Hannah Taylor-Gordon (born 1987)
- Aaron Taylor-Johnson (born 1990)
- Juno Temple (born 1989)
- Ellen Terry (1847–1928)
- Gabriel Thomson (born 1986)
- Justine Thornton (born 1970)
- Hero Fiennes Tiffin (born 1997)
- Nethra Tilakumara (born 1999)
- Will Tilston (born 2007)
- Elliott Tittensor (born 1989)
- Luke Tittensor (born 1989)
- Eleanor Tomlinson (born 1992)
- Russell Tovey (born 1981)
- Susan Tully (born 1967)
- Thomas Turgoose (born 1992)
- Lacey Turner (born 1988)
- Sophie Turner (born 1996)

== U ==
- Langston Uibel (born 1998)

== V ==
- Wendy van der Plank (born 1979)
- Anthony Valentine (1939–2015)
- Joshua Vaughan (born 2006)

== W ==
- Fiona Wade (born 1979)
- Daisy Waite (born 2005)
- Gary Warren (born 1954)
- Dennis Waterman (1948-2022)
- Emma Watson (born 1990)
- Jamie Waylett (born 1989)
- Honeysuckle Weeks (born 1979)
- Perdita Weeks (born 1985)
- Rollo Weeks (born 1987)
- Richard Wisker (born 1995)
- Sheila White (1948–2018)
- Jack Wild (1952–2006)
- Maisie Williams (born 1997)
- Amir Wilson (born 2004)
- Molly Windsor (born 1997)
- Kate Winslet (born 1975)
- Lara Wollington (born 2003)
- Jake Wood (born 1972)
- Carla Woodcock (born 1998)
- Adam Woodyatt (born 1968)
- Eleanor Worthington Cox (born 2001)
- Bethan Wright (born 1996)
- Bonnie Wright (born 1991)

== Y ==
- Danny Young (born 1986)
- Luke Youngblood (born 1986)

== See also ==
- List of current British child actors
