= Lists of child actors =

This is a list of lists of child actors.

== Former child actors ==
- List of former American child actors
- List of former British child actors
- List of former Filipino child actors

== Current child actors ==
- List of current American child actors
- List of current British child actors
- List of current Filipino child actors

== Combined lists ==
- List of Australian child actors
- List of Canadian child actors
- List of Chinese child actors
- List of Dutch child actors
- List of French child actors
- List of German child actors
- List of Indian child actors
- List of Irish child actors
- List of Italian child actors
- List of Japanese child actors
- List of New Zealand child actors
- List of Spanish child actors
- List of Swedish child actors
