= Marie Angel =

Marie Angel may refer to:

- Marie Angel (soprano) (born 1953), Australian opera singer
- Marie Angel (artist) (1923–2010), British illustrator and calligrapher
