= Coloma Convent Girls' School =

Catholic secondary school for girls in Croydon, England

Location
- Upper Shirley Road; Shirley, Greater London, CR9 5AS; England; 51°22′10″N 0°03′10″W

Information
- Type: Academy
- Motto: Laborare Est Orare (To Work is to Pray)
- Religious affiliation: Roman Catholic
- Established: 1869
- Founder: Canon Constant van Crombrugghe
- Local authority: Croydon
- Trust: SELCAT
- Department for Education URN: 149347 Tables
- Ofsted: Reports
- Headteacher: Danielle Bumford-Sinclair
- Gender: Girls
- Age: 11 to 18
- Colour: Navy blue Light blue
- Website: coloma.croydon.sch.uk

Coloma Convent Girls' School is a Roman Catholic secondary school and sixth form in a semi-rural location in Shirley, on the outskirts of Croydon, South London, England.

== History ==
The school regards its founder as being Constant van Crombrugghe, who founded the Congregation of the Daughters of Mary and Joseph in Belgium in 1817. There is a bronze bust of Van Crombrugghe in the Main Hall and a painting of him in their Performing Arts Centre.

The school opened on 2 August 1869, with one pupil. In 1871, property was found in Tavistock Road, Croydon, and named Coloma. The school remained there until its move in 1965 to the present site. At the start of its history, the school's motto was Timpore in Silvam (in time a forest) but after it became an established place of learning it was changed to Laborare est Orare (to work is to pray).

Previously a grammar school, Coloma became a comprehensive school in 1978, and was a grant-maintained school in 1994–1999. In 2000 the school opened a new sixth form centre. From September 2010 until late 2018 The Quest Academy was part of the separate Coloma Trust, an academy trust that later also included the Archbishop Lanfranc school.

Previously a voluntary aided school administered by Croydon London Borough Council, in November 2022 Coloma Convent Girls' School converted to academy status. The school is now sponsored by SELCAT, but continues to be under the jurisdiction of Roman Catholic Archdiocese of Southwark.

== Combined Cadet Force ==
While the school does not have their own Combined Cadet Force (CCF), a few of the girls per year get to attend CCF training at Royal Russell School enabling them to experience the Army or the RAF.

== Alumnae ==
=== Coloma Convent Girls' School ===
- Paula Ann Bland (b. 1968) - actress, played Claire Scott in Grange Hill
- Mwaka Mudenda (b. 1995) - television presenter
- Imani-Lara Lansiquot (b. 1997) - athlete
- Mya-Lecia Naylor (2002–2019) - actress, model and singer
- Jenny Shircore, make-up artist

=== Coloma Girls' Grammar School ===
- Barbara Jones (1912–1978) - artist, writer and mural painter
- Mavis Batey (1921–2013) - World War II codebreaker
- Marie Angel (1923–2010) - illustrator and calligrapher known for her book illustrations
- Sarah Thomas (b. 1952) - actress
- Erica Pienaar (b. 1952) - teacher, Dame
- Cathy Shipton (b. 1957) - actress who played Duffy in Casualty
