= Flatmates (British TV series) =

British television series

- Genre: Comedy drama
- Created by: Gary Parker; Steven Andrew; Raymond Lau
- Written by: Various
- Directed by: Dez McCarthy; Louise Ní Fhiannachta
- Starring: Tallulah Greive; Theo Stevenson; Richard Wisker; Nethra Tilakumara; Grace Hogg-Robinson
- Theme music composer: Mark Gordon
- Country of origin: United Kingdom
- Original language: English
- No. of series: 2
- No. of episodes: 18

Production
- Executive producer: Steven Andrew
- Producer: Raymond Lau
- Production company: Zodiak Kids Studios UK

Original release
- Network: BBC iPlayer
- Release: 5 August 2019 – 1 April 2021

Related
- Millie Inbetween

Flatmates is a British coming of age comedy drama series broadcast on BBC iPlayer and starring Tallulah Greive, Theo Stevenson and Richard Wisker reprising their roles from the series Millie Inbetween, although the series is intended for a much older audience. All ten episodes of the first series premiered on iPlayer on 5 August 2019. The second series consisted of eight episodes, all of which premiered on iPlayer on 1 April 2021. On 17 May 2023, Theo Stevenson confirmed on his Instagram stories that the show would not be returning for a third series.

== Premise ==
The series follows the lives of five young adults as they begin their steps into the adult world.

== Cast ==
- Tallulah Greive as Lauren McDonald (series 1)
- Theo Stevenson as Craig Taylor
- Richard Wisker as Declan
- Nethra Tilakumara as Yasmin, a waitress at the café the characters frequent
- Grace Hogg-Robinson as Mel, Craig's co-worker at the bowling alley
- Oliver Clayton as Russ, Lauren's co-worker, and rival
- Jordan Dawes as Craig 2, Craig and Mel's boss
- Hannah Jane Fox as Sharon Taylor, Lauren's mum. Fox reprises her role from Millie Inbetween.
- Jade Ogugua as Alex, Lauren's new boss
- Rebecca Atkinson as Erin (series 2), the landlady who owns the flats
- Theo Graham as Zak (series 2)
- Elèna Gyasi as Tiegan (series 2)
- Connor Calland as Callum (series 2)

== Development ==
Flatmates co-creator Steven Andrews said of the series "Flatmates represents the significant journey we all make from childhood to adulthood. With a balance of drama and comedy, the show taps perfectly into BBC iPlayer's millennial following and has all the elements we hope will make it a bingeable success".

== Episodes ==
=== Series 1 ===
Adapted from BBC iPlayer.

No.	Title	Directed by	Written by	Original release date
1	"Split Milk"	Dez McCarthy	Gary Parker	5 August 2019
Lauren travels from her hometown of Glasgow down to Manchester for a job interview at a high-profile tech company. Her mum gives her a care package intended for her step-brother Criag, a wannabe DJ who is living in the city and she reluctantly agrees to take it. She meets up with Craig and is impressed by his flat but is horrified by his untidiness. Craig offers Lauren a place to stay if she gets the job but she turns it down after he spills milk on her clothes and she storms out. Craig meets with Lauren's ex-boyfriend Declan and invites him to be his new flatmate. At her interview, Lauren embarrasses herself in front of her prospective new boss Alex but manages to get the job regardless. She visits Craig at work and they reconcile but Craig tells her that someone else has taken him up on his offer and that he is reluctant to kick Declan out as his compulsive cleaning means Craig will never have to tidy up. Lauren and Declan have an awkward reunion but Craig lightens the mood by getting them both drunk.
2	"Mr Nice Guy"	Dez McCarthy	Esther Bishop	5 August 2019
As the new flatmates adjust to living with one another, Declan confesses to Craig that he still loves Lauren and has a plan to get them back together by DJing at a local club to show her that he's grown up since they dated in school. Craig, jealous that Declan is a better DJ, convinces him that Lauren would prefer a nice guy over an edgy DJ. At work, Lauren meets Russ, who consistently undermines her in front of Alex. When Declan comes on too strong and irritates Lauren, Craig tells him he should take care of Russ to win her over, and, in return, Declan offers to let Craig help him, DJ. Declan confronts Russ, much to Lauren's annoyance. Later in the cafe, Lauren confesses to waitress Yas that she wants to keep her options open and Yas encourages her to be honest with him however when he apologizes to her, Lauren refrains from saying anything and instead informs Craig that Declan needs to move out. Lauren tells Declan to move out but Craig forces the pair to reconcile and Lauren reluctantly agrees to let Declan stay under the condition that they remain just friends.
3	"Swiping Up"	Louise Ní Fhiannachta	Bronagh Taggart	5 August 2019
Alex encourages her employees to find a healthy work/life balance so Lauren reluctantly lets Yas set up an online dating profile for her. After a string of disasters, Yas convinces Lauren to let her choose a date for her. Declan becomes increasingly irritated by Craig's lazy and untidy lifestyle but, after Declan becomes upset when he finds out Lauren is looking for a new boyfriend, Craig apologizes for being a bad friend and the two reconcile. At work, Craig's boss forces him and co-worker Mel to improve their customer service skills. Lauren becomes uncomfortable when Yas invites two girls on their double date and later confesses to Yas that she is happy being single and is over dating for the time being, which Declan overhears.
4	"Secrets and Lies"	Dez McCarthy	Bronagh Taggart	5 August 2019
Craig insists on throwing a house-warming party and the others reluctantly agree. Craig develops feelings for Yas, who agrees to come to the party because she is into Declan. Lauren and Declan struggle to navigate their new friends-only relationship. Erin, the landlady, arrives unannounced and is angry that she didn't know that two people had moved into the flat though Craig seems unconcerned. At the party, Mel gets annoyed that Craig is flirting with Yas, who, in turn, unsuccessfully attempts to flirt with Declan, who is too distracted to notice after he sees Lauren talking to another guy. Erin crashes the party and reveals that she's actually Craig's absent mum who wants to try and rebuild her relationship with him.
5	"Unstoppable"	Dez McCarthy	Kirsty Peart & Jess Kedward	5 August 2019
Lauren gets a big opportunity at work and, though Russ tries to undermine her, Alex asks her to run the company's latest campaign on unstoppable women. Becoming increasingly stressed, Declan tries to support her but backs off when Yas tells him that he should give Lauren space instead of smothering her. Lauren makes a big mistake and her mum encourages her to take ownership which impresses Alex. Realizing that Lauren needs him, Declan ignores Yas's advice and sends an empowering voicemail. Craig's boss allows him to DJ at the bowling alley but he is disappointed when he finds out it's a children's party, leading to an argument with Mel, though it eventually works out when Craig proves to be a hit at the party, At the flat, Lauren tells Declan that she appreciates him and the two have sex.
6	"The Storm"	Dez McCarthy	Gary Parker	5 August 2019
The next morning, Declan is euphoric believing that he and Lauren are back together whereas Lauren would rather forget what happened and gives Declan the cold shoulder. Lauren confesses to Yas that she didn't feel a spark and made a mistake sleeping with Declan, who overhears her. Upset, Declan tries to move out but a massive snowstorm traps him and the others inside. Yas and Mel try to disrupt the awkwardness between by suggesting games but Declan and Lauren get into a huge argument. Mel admits that she was responsible for getting Craig fired from work and Yas announces that she fancies Declan and not Craig. Declan and Lauren discuss their relationship and reconcile but he still moves out. Craig's boss offers him his job back but he declines so he can focus on his music career full-time.
7	"Cosplay"	Louise Ní Fhiannachta	Kirsty Peart & Jess Kedward	5 August 2019
Deadpool, Jon Snow, Batgirl, and Captain Marvel walk into a Sportsbowl...
8	"Keeping It Real"	Louise Ní Fhiannachta	Gary Parker	5 August 2019
Craig is in a crisis that nobody notices except Lauren as the others have their minds elsewhere.
9	"Saving Craig"	Louise Ní Fhiannachta	Gary Parker	5 August 2019
The flatmates hold an intervention to help Craig but need help from the Landlady.
10	"Resolutions"	Louise Ní Fhiannachta	Bronagh Taggart	5 August 2019
New Year's resolutions are great, but how long that they last before they all fall apart?
