= Nethra Tilakumara =

English actress (born 1999)

- Born: Neethra Rita Tilakumara; 14 June 1999 (age 27); Westminster, London, England
- Education: Emil Dale Academy; Sylvia Young Theatre School
- Occupation: Actress
- Years active: 2011, 2018–present
- Television: Flatmates (2019–2021); So Awkward (2019–2020); Tell Me Everything (2024)
- Partner: Archie Lyndhurst (2019–2020; his death)

Nethra Rita Tilakumara (born 14 June 1999), is an English actress. Her roles include Yasmin in the BBC iPlayer coming of age comedy drama series Flatmates (2019–2021), Kat in the CBBC sitcom So Awkward (2019–2020) and Naisha Jadu in the ITVX teen drama series Tell Me Everything (2024).

== Early life ==
Neethra Rita Tilakumara was born in Westminster, Greater London on 14 June 1999. She has three younger siblings. She is of Sri Lankan descent and grew up in Borehamwood, south Hertfordshire.

Tilakumara took acting classes at the local Stagecoach Performing Arts branch. She went on to pursue a BTEC Extended Diploma at Emil Dale Academy. She also attended the Sylvia Young Theatre School.

== Career ==
Tilakumara began her career as a child actress with the role of Singing Soraya in the 3D comedy film Horrid Henry: The Movie. The film focuses on Henry and the Purple Hand Gang as they fight to prevent the closure of their school by an evil private school headmaster. The film is based on the character Horrid Henry from the children's book series of the same name by Francesca Simon and takes place before series three of the TV series. The film was released on 29 July 2011.

After a seven-year hiatus, Tilakumara returned to acting, making her television debut in the role of Jamila Khan in the final episode in the third series of the BBC One military drama Our Girl, which aired on 24 July 2018.

From August 2019 to April 2021, Tilakumara played Yasmin, a waitress in a café, in the BBC iPlayer coming of age comedy-drama Flatmates, a spin-off of the CBBC children's sitcom Millie Inbetween. In September 2019, Tilakumara joined the main cast of the CBBC sitcom So Awkward as Kat, the girlfriend of Oliver 'Ollie' Coulter (Archie Lyndhurst), for its fifth series, a role she would reprise in the sixth series, making her final appearance in the October 2020.

Tilakumara joined the main cast of the teen drama series Tell Me Everything as Naisha Jadu for its second series, which was released in full on ITVX on 6 June 2024 and weekly on ITV2.

== Personal life ==
Tilakumara was in a relationship with her So Awkward co-star Archie Lyndhurst, also a designer and the only child of Only Fools and Horses actor Nicholas Lyndhurst, from 12 April 2019 until his sudden death on 22 September 2020, at the age of 19.

== Filmography ==
Year	Title	Role	Notes
2011	Horrid Henry: The Movie	Singing Soraya	
2018	Our Girl	Jamila Khan	Episode: "Bangladesh Tour: Episode 4"
2019–2020	Flatmates	Yasmin	Main role
2019–2020	So Awkward	Kat	Main role (season 5–6)
2024	Tell Me Everything	Naisha Jadu	Main role (season 2)
TBA	Saviour	Nita Sangar	
