= Warren (TV series) =

BBC TV comedy series

- Genre: Sitcom
- Created by: Jimmy Donny Cosgrove; Paul McKenna
- Written by: Jimmy Donny Cosgrove; Paul McKenna
- Directed by: Ben Gosling Fuller; Adam Miller (first episode)
- Starring: Martin Clunes; Lisa Millett; Judith Barker; Tim Preston; Oscar Morgan
- Opening theme: "Warren Theme"
- Ending theme: "Warren End Theme"
- Composer: Nina Humphreys
- Country of origin: United Kingdom
- Original language: English
- No. of series: 1
- No. of episodes: 6

Production
- Executive producers: Kate Daughton; Jimmy Mulville; Helen Williams
- Producer: Tom Jordan
- Editor: Robin Hill
- Running time: 28 minutes
- Production company: Hat Trick Productions

Original release
- Network: BBC One
- Release: 25 February – 1 April 2019

Warren is a British sitcom, which aired on BBC One between February and April 2019. The series stars Martin Clunes, Lisa Millett, Tim Preston and Oscar Morgan in the main roles. It was written by Jimmy Donny Cosgrove and Paul McKenna. The BBC did not commission any further series after the first.

== Synopsis ==
The sitcom shows the life of the angry, impatient, selfish and abrasive driving instructor Warren Thompson, who moved in with his partner Anne Humphries and her two teenage sons Charlie and Danny in Preston, after her father, Bill fell ill. Warren is loosely based on Cosgrove's father and also a character from one of his short films called "Warren Thompson Driving School" (which is also the name of the character's driving school).

== Cast ==
- Martin Clunes as Warren Thompson:
- Lisa Millett as Anne Humphries: Warren's partner who is Charlie and Danny's mother.
- Tim Preston as Charlie Humphries: Anne's eldest son and Danny's brother.
- Oscar Morgan as Danny Humphries: Anne's youngest son, Charlie's brother and Jenny's boyfriend.
- Neil Edmond as Ian: Paula's husband and Warren's next-door neighbour.
- Maya Sondhi as Paula: Ian's wife and Warren's next-door neighbour.
- Emily Coates as Jenny: Danny's girlfriend.
- David Hargreaves as Bill: Anne's father and Sheila's husband.
- Judith Barker as Sheila: Anne's mother and Bill's wife.

== Episodes ==
No.	Title	Directed by	Written by	Original release date	UK viewers (millions)
1	"The Pond"	Ben Gosling Fuller; Adam Miller	Jimmy Donny Cosgrove; Paul McKenna	25 February 2019	5.93
In order to beat his neighbour Ian, Warren attempts to get Charlie a job at a Garden Centre in order to get gear for a pond for a discount. However, when he discovers that he cannot get a discount, he attempts a little heist.
2	"The Rival"	Ben Gosling Fuller	Jimmy Donny Cosgrove; Paul McKenna	4 March 2019	2.39
A new rival company, Daz's Drivers, has shown up and is taking Warren's customers, causing financial trouble. In order to regain customers, Warren asks Danny to create a Facebook page and must be a bit nicer to assure his customers will stick with him. But when false rumours go around that he ran over a cat, his public image worsens.
3	"The Tax Return"	Ben Gosling Fuller	Jimmy Donny Cosgrove; Paul McKenna	11 March 2019	N/A (<4.59) (Note: Not reported in the weekly top 15 programmes for four-screen viewer ratings.)
When Anne's brother-in-law Colin is conned out of all his money, he turns to Warren for advice. When the advice gets him kicked out, Warren gets Colin to do DIY around the house, while Anne takes her sister Liz on a spa break to clear her head. Meanwhile, Charlie's got a girlfriend named Priya, but unknowingly goes to the same place Anne and Liz are.
4	"The Father Figure"	Ben Gosling Fuller	Jimmy Donny Cosgrove; Paul McKenna	18 March 2019	N/A (<4.37)
While Charlie is on holiday to Hawaii, Danny begins acting weird, so Anne asks Warren to talk to him. But when he discovers he Danny a crush on a girl named Jenny, Warren keeps it a secret from Anne and takes Danny to the local shop to talk to her. Meanwhile, Warren gets a new chicken named Maude and attempts to annoy Ian, who is scared of chickens.
5	"The Holiday"	Ben Gosling Fuller	Jimmy Donny Cosgrove; Paul McKenna	25 March 2019	N/A (<4.40)
After Anne's father Bill is given the all clear on an unknown health problem, she and Warren join Bill and Sheila on a holiday to Sunny Groves in Morecambe. But when Warren discovers that they have a bronze-range caravan after a mix up, he attempts to gain the said golden deluxe caravan from fellow camper Matthew Thompson by saying that Bill has only a week to live. Back in Preston, Charlie throws a house party, but when Danny invites Ian and Paula, he jinxes it when only Ian, Paula and Jenny arrive.
6	"The Funeral"	Ben Gosling Fuller	Jimmy Donny Cosgrove; Paul McKenna	1 April 2019	1.84
A funeral is being held for Bill's sister Faye. Warren is using the family's eight-seater to transport himself with the rest of the family: Anne, Charlie, Danny, Bill, Sheila, Liz and Colin. But when the van breaks down, the family are stuck on a motorway; to make matters worse: Bill has a urine infection and Warren's impatience cause the car mechanic to leave. Meanwhile, Danny is worried about his relationship with Jenny as she is not texting him.

== Critical reception ==
Warren received negative reviews, with some viewers calling it "uncomfortable", while The Telegraph called it "the final nail in the coffin for British sitcom". Deborah Ross of The Mail on Sunday (UK) on 03/04/2019 said: "The script did everything possible to make Warren the least funny, most terrible human being ever."
