= List of current British child actors =

This is a list of child actors from the United Kingdom. All actors are aged seventeen and under. When they turn eighteen, they legally become young adults and are no longer listed as child actors, and will be moved to the List of former British child actors.

== A ==
- Nykiya Adams (born 2012)
- Dexter Sol Ansell (born 2014)

== B ==
- Diaana Babnicova (born 2009)
- Robyn Betteridge (born 2011)
- Serrana Su-Ling Bliss (born c. 2009)
- Olivia Booth-Ford (born 2010)
- Tabitha Byron (born 2010)

== C ==
- Lola Campbell (born 2010/2011)
- Owen Cooper (born 2009)
- Frankie Corio (born 2010)

== F ==
- Matilda Firth (born 2014)
- Nell Fisher (born 2011)

== H ==
- Rocco Haynes (born 2013)
- Elliott Heffernan (born 2012/2013)
- Jude Hill (born 2010)
- Emilia Holliday (born 2010/2011)

== J ==
- Jacobi Jupe (born 2013)

== L ==
- Phoenix Laroche (born 2012/2013)
- Kíla Lord Cassidy (born 2009)

== N ==
- Woody Norman (born 2009)

== R ==
- Eve Ridley (born 2011)
- Lenny Rush (born 2009)

== S ==
- Oliver Savell (born 2009)
- Freya Skye (born 2009)
- Amelie Bea Smith (born 2011)
- Arabella Stanton (born 2014)

== T ==
- Alfie Tempest (born 2010)
- Evie Templeton (born 2008)
- Lillia Turner (born 2009)

== V ==
- Xia Vigor (born 2009)

== W ==
- Indica Watson (born 2010)
- Scott Ellis Watson (born 2010)
- Alfie Williams (born 2011)

== Y ==
- Archie Yates (born 2009)
