= Jimmy Donny Cosgrove =

English comedian, actor and writer

Jimmy Donny Cosgrove (born James Cosgrove, 13 April 1985) is a writer, actor and comedian from Andover, Hampshire. He is known for co-writing the BBC 1 sitcom Warren starring Martin Clunes.

== Early life and education ==
Cosgrove was born in Winchester to Liz and Dave Cosgrove. He has two sisters and attended Harrow Way Community and Kimpton Primary School as a child. He studied comedy writing and performance at Southampton Solent University, despite only obtaining 1 GCSE pass. Cosgrove told a podcast in 2019, "I just kind of blagged my way in. I got the number and email address of the course tutor and bombarded him every day for 6 weeks. In the end, he rang me and asked me to stop emailing him but he did invite me for an audition. I started uni 2 weeks later".

== Career ==
Cosgrove hosts a weekly podcast with writing partner Paul Mckenna and writer of the Sky sitcom 'Hitmen' Joe Parham called 'The Paul Mckenna & Jimmy Donny Cosgrove (with Joe Parham) Podcast'.
