= Constant van Crombrugghe =

Flemish canon (1789–1865)

Constant Van Crombrugghe
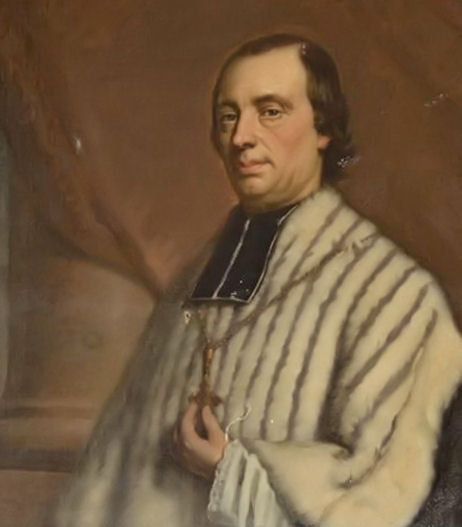
- Born: Constant Guillaume Van Crombrugghe; 14 October 1789; Geraardsbergen
- Died: 1 December 1865 (aged 76); Ghent
- Occupations: politician, canon

Constant Guillaume Van Crombrugghe (14 October 1789 – 1 December 1865) was a Flemish canon and founder of several religious orders: Josephites or Fathers Jozefieten (1817) and Subsidiaries of the Sisters of Mary and Joseph. The latter congregation was founded in 1838 split in the Ladies of Mary and the Sisters of St. Jozef of Jozefienen. He also founded The Daughters of Mary and Joseph which founded Coloma Convent Girls' School in 1869 and is still attended by students in Croydon, England.

He came from a well-established and affluent family, and his father, Ghislain-François, was a prosperous brewer in Grammont. His mother, Cécile-Joseph, was a powerful figure in the lace industry and came from a well-known and prominent Grammont family.

The order established several schools in Belgium and St George's College, Weybridge in England.

Van Crombrugghe was also a member of the National Congress, the constituent assembly at which the Belgian Constitution was written.

== Functions ==
- Canon of Saint-Bavochapter Cathedral, 1830
- Archdeacon of the chapter, 1863
- Officer of the order of Leopold, by Royal Decree of 1863.
- Iron cross
