= Oscar Morgan =

British actor (born 1999)

- Born: Oscar Moritz Morgan; 28 August 1999 (age 26); London, England
- Occupation: Actor
- Years active: 2013–present

Oscar Morgan (born 28 August 1999) is a British actor. He is known for his roles in The CW superhero series Gotham Knights (2023), the HBO fantasy drama A Knight of the Seven Kingdoms (2026), the CBBC children's sitcom Millie Inbetween (2018) and the romantic drama film Duino (2024).

== Personal life ==
Morgan was born in London to a British mother and a German father. He has a younger sister.

He is fluent in German.

== Career ==
Morgan comes from a theatre background and played Kester Parish in the NYMT 2013 production of The Other School, a musical comedy". In 2014, he played Joe in The Ragged Child. He appeared in the 2016 release of the musical Spring Awakening as Ernst and in 2018 he joined the stage production The Winslow Boy, directed by Rachel Kavanaugh, as Fred.

His first role on screen was a two-episode appearance in the BBC historical drama miniseries The Miniaturist (2017). He eventually went on to join the cast of the BBC comedy Warren in 2019. He starred in the drama Peaceful which premiered at the 2021 Cannes Film Festival.

He appeared in several other roles, including an episode of Death in Paradise in 2022 and the final episode of The Crown in 2023, as a 'shooting friend' of Prince William and Prince Harry.

In 2023, he also played Turner Hayes, the adopted son of Bruce Wayne, in The CW superhero drama Gotham Knights. It follows his character's journey, in forming unlikely alliances with young vigilante figures, after being framed for Batman's death.

Morgan landed his first major film role in Duino (2024), an autobiographical work inspired by the experiences Juan Pablo Di Pace had lived during his youth. He starred as Alexander, a Swedish boy, who is the main love interest of younger Matias.

In 2026, he appeared as Prince Valarr Targaryen in A Knight of the Seven Kingdoms. He will be in the upcoming season three of Wednesday, which is set to be released in 2027.

== Acting Credits ==
=== Film ===
Year	Title	Role	Notes
2021	Peaceful	Léandre	
2022	Zero	Container Teen Oscar	
2024	Duino	Young Alexander	

=== Television ===
Year	Title	Role	Notes
2017	The Miniaturist	Messenger Boy	2 episodes
2018	Millie Inbetween	Leo	10 episodes
2018	Trauma	Jack Asherwood	1 episode
2019	Warren	Danny	6 episodes
2022	Death in Paradise	Jake Faircroft	1 episode
2023	Gotham Knights	Turner Hayes	13 episodes
2023	The Crown	Shooting Friend	1 episode
2024	Masters of the Air	Nazi Air Raid Warden	1 episode
2026	A Knight of the Seven Kingdoms	Prince Valarr Targaryen	3 episodes
TBA	Wednesday	Atticus	TBA

=== Stage ===
Year	Title	Role	Notes
2013	The Other School	Kester	Musical
2014	The Ragged Child	Joe	Musical
2016	Spring Awakening	Ernst	Musical
2018	The Winslow Boy	Fred	
