= Cinderella (2021 American film) =

Film by Kay Cannon

- Official release poster
- Directed by: Kay Cannon
- Written by: Kay Cannon
- Based on: "Cinderella" by Charles Perrault
- Produced by: James Corden; Leo Pearlman; Jonathan Kadin; Shannon McIntosh; Irene Marquette
- Starring: Camila Cabello; Nicholas Galitzine; Idina Menzel; Minnie Driver; Billy Porter; Pierce Brosnan
- Cinematography: Henry Braham
- Edited by: Stacey Schroeder
- Music by: Mychael Danna; Jessica Weiss
- Production companies: Sony Pictures; Fulwell 73
- Distributed by: Amazon Studios
- Release dates: August 30, 2021 (Greek Theatre); September 3, 2021 (United States)
- Running time: 113 minutes
- Countries: United States; United Kingdom
- Language: English

Cinderella is a 2021 jukebox musical romantic comedy film based on the fairy tale of the same name by Charles Perrault. Written and directed by Kay Cannon, it stars singer-songwriter Camila Cabello as the title character in her acting debut, alongside Nicholas Galitzine, Idina Menzel, Minnie Driver, Billy Porter, and Pierce Brosnan. It is a jukebox musical, featuring pop and rock hits, in addition to several original songs.

Development began in April 2019, when Sony Pictures announced a musical-style film of Cinderella, with Cannon writing and directing. The film was produced by James Corden, through Fulwell 73 with Leo Pearlman, Jonathan Kadin and Shannon McIntosh. Principal photography began in February 2020 at Pinewood Studios, and was suspended in March 2020 due to the COVID-19 pandemic. Production resumed in August 2020 and concluded in September.

Cinderella was released in select theaters and digitally on Amazon Prime Video on September 3, 2021 to mixed reviews from critics. It was the most-watched streaming film during its opening weekend, with views from 1.1 million U.S. households.

== Plot ==
Ella is an ambitious young princess who dreams of establishing her shop, Dresses by Ella. But since her father died, she is forced by her stepmother, Vivian, to work as a scullery maid and is referred to by the name Cinderella.

After she catches the eye of Prince Robert in passing, he disguises himself as a commoner and sets out in hopes of meeting her.

Robert finds Ella among the local market vendors, trying to sell one of her creations. After some playful banter, he buys her dress for triple the original price. Robert invites Ella to an upcoming ball, where he promises she can mingle with people from around the world who will want to buy her designs.

On the day of the ball, Ella's stepmother Vivian forbids her to attend, as Ella has already been promised in marriage to Thomas the vegetable merchant. Vivian throws ink on Ella's dress, ensuring that only her own daughters Malvolia and Narissa can attend.

Though Ella's hopes are dashed, her fairy godparent Fab G comes to her aid. He uses magic to outfit her in a gown of her own design and a pair of glass shoes. Mice become footmen for a crate transformed into a carriage that takes Ella to the ball. There she meets visiting queen Tatiana, who offers to take Ella around the world as her personal dressmaker. She also meets Robert's sister, Princess Gwen, who is wearing the dress Ella sold him in the market.

When Robert proposes to Ella, she demurs, explaining that marriage will put an end to her dressmaking dreams, which are finally within reach. Robert, whose own lifelong ambition has been to assume the throne, struggles with this answer. At the stroke of midnight, Ella leaves the ball after throwing her shoe at one of the royal attendants, who tries to catch her.

The next day, Vivian reveals her own bitter story, trying to make Ella understand that going off to pursue one's personal dreams is incompatible with love and marriage. Seeing the remaining glass slipper in Ella's room, she realizes she is the mystery girl the prince has been seeking, so she tries to convince her to marry Robert. When Ella refuses, Vivian gives her to Thomas.

With the help of Queen Beatrice, King Rowan accepts that Robert wishes to marry a commoner, giving him the glass slipper as he searches for Ella. She, having run away from Thomas, is reunited with Robert in a forest, where they profess their love for each other and share a kiss. The pair reach the market in time to show her designs to her benefactor, Tatiana, who accepts them and invites Ella to travel with her.

Robert introduces Ella to the king and queen, and informs them of their shared decision to travel the world. Though this nullifies his future ascension to the throne, Beatrice smiles as Rowan proudly names Gwen (who has repeatedly shown an interest and ability in affairs of state) first in line to the throne. Citizens of the kingdom gather to witness and celebrate as the royal family officially announces these developments.

== Cast ==
- Camila Cabello as Cinderella / Ella
- Idina Menzel as Vivian, the stepmother
- Minnie Driver as Queen Beatrice
- Nicholas Galitzine as Prince Robert
- Billy Porter as Fab G
- Pierce Brosnan as King Rowan
- Maddie Baillio as Malvolia
- Charlotte Spencer as Narissa
- James Corden as James the Mouse
- James Acaster as John the Mouse
- Romesh Ranganathan as Romesh the Mouse
- Tallulah Greive as Princess Gwen
- Beverley Knight as Queen Tatiana
- Doc Brown as Town crier
- Rob Beckett as Thomas Cecil
- Jenet Le Lacheur as Wilbur
- Fra Fee as Hench
- Luke Latchman as Griff
- Mary Higgins as Princess Laura
- Nakai Warikandwa as Princess Nakai
- Nandi Bushell as Drummer Girl

== Production ==
In April 2019, Columbia Pictures announced a musical retelling of "Cinderella", with Kay Cannon writing and directing. The idea to reinterpret "Cinderella" came from James Corden, who produced the film through Fulwell 73 with Leo Pearlman, Jonathan Kadin, and Shannon McIntosh.

In April 2019, Camila Cabello was attached in the role of Cinderella. In October 2019, it was announced that talks were underway with Idina Menzel as Cinderella's stepmother, and Billy Porter for the role of fairy godparent. In December 2019, Nicholas Galitzine was added to the cast as Prince Robert.

Principal photography began in February 2020 at Pinewood Studios in the United Kingdom. Filming was suspended in March 2020 due to the COVID-19 pandemic. Production resumed in August 2020 and concluded in September.

Cinderella's carriage was designed to promote Mercedes-Benz.

Waddesdon Manor in Buckinghamshire was used as the setting for Queen Beatrice and King Rowan's castle in the film.

== Music ==
=== Soundtrack ===
In April 2019, it was announced that Camila Cabello was working on the soundtrack for the film. In October 2020, Idina Menzel confirmed that "[she and Camila] both have original songs as well." On August 2, 2021, it was announced by the director that the soundtrack would be released on September 3, 2021.

=== Film score ===
Cinderella (Score from the Amazon Original Movie)

Film score by Mychael Danna and Jessica Rose Weiss
- Released: September 3, 2021
- Recorded: February 2021
- Studio: Synchron Stage Vienna
- Genre: Orchestral
- Length: 24:46
- Label: Sony Classical
- Producers: Mychael Danna; Jessica Weiss

Mychael Danna chronology
Stillwater (2021)	Cinderella (2021)

Jessica Rose Weiss chronology
Afterlife of the Party (2021)	Cinderella (2021)	Dog Gone Trouble (2021)

In February 2021, Jessica Rose Weiss confirmed that she and Mychael Danna were working on the film score, and recording the score with an orchestra led by Johannes Vogel at Synchron Stage Vienna. The film score was released digitally by Sony Classical on September 3.

No.	Title	Length
1.	"Ella's Village"	0:48
2.	"Find a Match"	0:38
3.	"Wifey Fish Guts"	1:10
4.	"The Pain Is Quite Terrific"	0:40
5.	"Put That Dress Down"	0:44
6.	"Chrysalis"	0:45
7.	"I Believe in You"	1:16
8.	"This Is My Chance"	0:50
9.	"Back to the Basement"	1:21
10.	"Adventure Time"	0:37
11.	"Fab G"	0:42
12.	"Cautionary Magic"	0:40
13.	"Meeting the Queen"	0:48
14.	"First Dance"	1:26
15.	"Romance & Rodents"	0:54
16.	"Palace Escape"	2:29
17.	"Stroke of Midnight"	0:45
18.	"Could It Be Love"	1:45
19.	"Viviane's Lament"	2:42
20.	"Escape Plan"	0:37
21.	"Search for Ella"	0:52
22.	"I Choose You"	0:44
23.	"We're in Business"	0:29
24.	"A Lady's Right to Rule"	0:50
Total length:		24:46

== Marketing ==
As part of the film's marketing, Amazon Prime Video partnered with Mercedes-Benz in August 2021. On August 9, Japanese shoes brand Onitsuka Tiger announced the release of a limited edition sneakers created in collaboration with Cinderella. On August 11, hair brand John Frieda announced a collaboration with Cinderella.

== Release ==
Cinderella was released in select theaters and digitally in 240 territories via Amazon Prime Video on September 3, 2021. It had a premiere event on August 30, 2021, at the Greek Theatre in Los Angeles. Samba TV reported that 1.1 million American households streamed the film over its first four days of release, while Amazon claimed it was the most-watched VOD title over the same frame.

In June 2019, Sony scheduled the film for release February 5, 2021. In January 2021, the release date was pushed back to July 16, 2021. In May 2021, Sony cancelled the film's theatrical debut and announced that the film had been bought by Amazon Studios except China, Sony would also retain home entertainment and linear television rights to the film.

=== Home media ===
Cinderella was released on Blu-ray, DVD, and Digital HD on June 21, 2022, by Sony Pictures Home Entertainment.

== Reception ==
=== Audience viewership ===
According to Samba TV, the film was watched in 1.1 million U.S. households over its four-day Labor Day weekend debut and in 2.2 million households by the end of its first 30 days. According to the analytics company Screen Engine, Cinderella was the most-watched streaming film during its opening weekend, as well as the most-watched musical film yet in 2021.

=== Critical response ===
On review aggregator Rotten Tomatoes, the film holds an approval rating of 41% based on 135 reviews, with an average rating of 4.9/10. The website's critics consensus reads, "This singalong-worthy Cinderella sprinkles some modern fairy dust on the oft-told tale, but flat performances and clunky dialogue make watching often feel like a chore." On Metacritic, it has a weighted average score of 41 out of 100 based on reviews from 30 critics, indicating "mixed or average" reviews.

Richard Roeper of the Chicago Sun-Times gave the film three out of four stars and praised Cabello for her performance, saying "she has a real knack for comedy" and described the film as having an "upbeat, breezy and sentimental style, laced with some sharp humor and filled with familiar and catchy pop tunes refashioned to fit the storyline." Jonathan Sim of ComingSoon.net wrote, "It's a progressively charming take on a romantic tale, and there are sweet, romantic moments throughout the film, even if there isn't much you haven't seen before."

Courtney Howard of Variety was critical of many of the creative choices, the inconsistent pacing, and the character development. She called the film a "mediocre musical" and felt it was both "underdeveloped and overstuffed" at the same time.
