= The Beast Will Rise =

Series of monologues by Philip Ridley

- Genre: Monologues
- Written by: Philip Ridley
- Directed by: Wiebke Green
- Starring: Rachel Bright; Grace Hogg-Robinson; Charlie Quirke; Nat Johnson; Mirren Mack; Unique Spencer; Lucy Gape; Mike Evans; Steve Furst; Joseph Potter; Tyler Conti; Eleanor Fanyinka; Joseph Drake; Yanexi Enriquez; Kyle Rowe
- Country of origin: Great Britain
- Original language: English
- No. of episodes: 15

Production
- Producer: Jack Silver
- Running time: Various
- Production company: Tramp Productions

Original release
- Network: YouTube
- Release: 2 April – 21 October 2020

The Beast Will Rise is a series of monologues written by Philip Ridley.

The monologues were performed online by the cast of Ridley's play The Beast of Blue Yonder, which was scheduled to be performed at The Southwark Playhouse on 2 April 2020 but was cancelled as a result of the COVID-19 pandemic.

Five of the monologues from The Beast Will Rise were performed together live at The New Normal Festival in Wandsworth on 18 August 2020.

== Monologues ==
- Gators
- Zarabooshka
- Chihuahua
- Origami
- Wound
- Telescope
- River
- Eclipse
- Performance
- Star
- Night
- Puzzle
- Snow
- Rosewater
- Cactus

== Glitter in the Dark competition ==
From June - July 2020 the company producing The Beast Will Rise, Tramp Productions, ran a competition for actors to star in one of the monologues as part of the series. The winner would also receive a £150 cash prize.

The competition was open to "Anyone graduating from a drama school or other acting training in 2020" and "d/Deaf and disabled actors at the start of their careers regardless of [actor training]". Entrants were required to submit a footage of themselves performing a 1-2 minute extract of any of the monologues from that had been released up to that point.

On 25 July Tramp Productions on their Twitter account announced that the winner of the competition was the 2020 Mountview graduate Yanexi Enriquez.
