= Jedward's Big Adventure =

- Genre: Children's game show
- Presented by: Jedward
- Voices of: Jim Howick
- Opening theme: "Jedward's Big Adventure" by Jedward
- Country of origin: United Kingdom
- Original language: English
- No. of series: 3
- No. of episodes: 20

Production
- Running time: 28 minutes
- Production company: Initial

Original release
- Network: CBBC Channel
- Release: 6 February 2012 – 31 January 2014

Related
- OMG! Jedward's Dream Factory

Jedward's Big Adventure is a children's television programme airing on CBBC. It is hosted by Irish twins Jedward (John and Edward Grimes) and follows them as they visit various UNESCO historical sites around the United Kingdom.

Each teaming up with celebrity guests, the twins are tasked with learning as much about each site as possible, before leading a tour of real tourists and passing on what they've learned.

Two series of five episodes each were produced and broadcast, whilst a third series was extended to 10 episodes, broadcast in January 2014.

== Premise ==
Each episode sees the twins taken on guided tours around various historical landmarks where there are given facts to learn. After this, each twin is given a celebrity helper forming Team John and Team Edward. They must then relay the facts first to their celebrity helper, and then later on to a group of tourists, trying to make the facts as clear and memorable as possible.

At the end of each tour, the tourists are given a quiz to test their knowledge on what they have learnt, with questions corresponding to the subjects taught by each team. The winner is the team whose tourists scored highest. The losing team faces a forfeit. For the second and third series, the winning team also won a special treat.

== Transmissions ==
Series	Episodes	Originally released		Series score
Series	Episodes	First released	Last released	Series score
1	5	6 February 2012	10 February 2012	John 3–2 Edward
2	5	7 January 2013	11 January 2013	John 4–1 Edward
3	10	20 January 2014	31 January 2014	John 4–3 Edward

== Episodes ==
=== Series 1 (2012) ===
No. overall	No. in series	Location	Team John	Team Edward	Original release date
1	1	Tower of London	Brian Dowling	Joe Swash	6 February 2012
The twins arrive at the Tower and are taught about its construction and The Yeoman Warders. They are taken to see examples of instruments used to torture prisoners of the tower, including Guy Fawkes. They are then shown Traitors' Gate and taught about the significance of the Ravens before finally been taught about The Royal Menagerie. John and Brian scored 20 points, while Edward and Joe scored 28. Winners: Edward and Joe Forfeit: John and Brian were put in the stocks and pelted with water balloons.
2	2	Blaenavon	Richard Wisker	Ceallach Spellman	7 February 2012
The boys arrive at the Ironworks and are taught about what is needed to make Iron. They then go down into a coal mine and are learn about the working conditions that miners faced. They are also told about the use of children as workers. Next they are shown the conditions of an Iron furnace before being taken to see the Stack Square cottages lived in by the Ironworks employees. Finally they learn about transportation at the time such as the use of the Canal and the Railway systems. John and Richard scored 31 points, while Edward and Ceallach scored 21 Winners: John and Richard, who won a ride in steam train. Forfeit: Edward and Ceallach were forced to eat Gruel.
3	3	Jurassic Coast	Rav Wilding	Sian and Jessica from Parade	8 February 2012
The twins visit the Jurassic Coast and are told about the history of fossils in the area. They then learn about the Triassic, Jurassic and Cretaceous cliffs in the area. They learn the story of Mary Anning and the various fossils she found, including the Ichthyosaur fossil. After learning about the strength of dinosaurs, the twins are shown some dinosaur footprints and taught about Coprolite. John and Rav scored 30 points while Edward, Sian and Jessica scored 23. Winners: John and Rav, who won a ride in a speedboat Forfeit: Edward, Sian and Jessica had to go in the cold sea.
4	4	Edinburgh	Naomi Wilkinson	Chris Rankin	9 February 2012
The twins visit Edinburgh Castle and learn about its position atop Castle Rock. They are then taken to see the vaults and taught about the people held prisoner there. They are then told about the living conditions in the Medieval period and how Bubonic Plague spread. The boys are then taught about traditional Scottish dress such as the Kilt. They learn about body snatching and the steps taken to prevent it, before finally learning about Witch hunting. John and Naomi scored 24 points while Edward and Chris scored 28. Winners: Edward and Chris Forfeit: John and Naomi were gunged to replicate the act of Gardyloo
5	5	Hadrian's Wall	Andy Akinwolere	Johny Pitts	10 February 2012
The boys arrive at Hadrian's Wall and are taught the basic facts about its history and construction before being taken to see the latrines used by the soldiers who patrolled the wall. They are then shown the bathhouse in the fort before learning about how the soldiers did battle, in particular the Testudo formation. Finally they learn about the Archaeology at the site and are taught about the Vindolanda tablets. Both teams score 32 points so it is taken to "Jedlock" where each tourist is asked which team they thought did best. John and Andy scored 41 points while Edward and Johny scored 35. Winners: John and Andy Forfeit: Edward and Johny are made to take an ice bath to replicate the conditions of a frigidarium, Edward suffered from severe frostburn following this failure.

=== Series 2 (2013) ===
No. overall	No. in series	Location	Team John	Team Edward	Original release date
6	1	Thames	Ed Petrie	Richard Wisker	7 January 2013
The twins arrive in London and are taken on a trip down the River Thames where they are told about the species that live in the river. Following this, they visit The Monument and learn about the Great Fire of London. After learning facts about the display of severed heads of criminals and being shown Cleopatras Needle, the twins are then shown Tower Bridge and learn about its history and construction. John and Ed scored 27 points, while Edward and Richard scored 12. Winners: John and Ed, who won a ride on a speed boat on the River Thames Forfeit: Edward and Richard had to do the fish slapping dance
7	2	Duxford	Naveed Choudhry	Katie McGlynn	8 January 2013
The boys arrive at the Imperial War Museum Duxford and are first shown Battle of Britain planes including a replica Supermarine Spitfire by expert Carl Warner. They then learn about Air-raid shelters used during The Blitz. They are shown into the old Operations Room and learn about how defence operations were planned they also learn about American war planes such as Sally B, a Boeing B-17 Flying Fortress and about how American culture came to Britain in the form of the Jitterbug. They are shown an Avro Lancaster and learn about the bouncing bomb before finally learning about the Special Operations Executive. John and Naveed scored 35, while Edward and Katie scored 29. Winners: John and Naveed, who won a flight in a war plane. Forfeit: Edward and Katie had to stay in a dark bomb shelter while wearing WW2 gas masks,
8	3	Greenwich	Stacey Solomon	Shannon Flynn	9 January 2013
The boys arrive at Greenwich. They first visit the Painted Hall at the Old Royal Naval College and learn all about Admiral Nelson. They then move on to the Queen's House, where they are taught about Baroque music. Then they go on to learn about James I and the introduction of the Union Flag. They are taken to see the Cutty Sark and learn about the conditions on board. Next they go to the Meridian Line before finally learning about the Solar System at Greenwich Observatory .John and Stacey scored 63, while Edward and Shannon scored 45. Winners: John and Stacey, who won a Stargazing experience. Forfeit: Edward and Shannon, who were drenched in cold tea, while Shannon performed a jig in a white nightgown.
9	4	Cheddar Gorge	Jamie Borthwick	Kieran Alleyne	10 January 2013
The boys arrive at Cheddar and begin with a bus tour through Cheddar Gorge where they learn some basic facts and about the wildlife that lives there. They then visit Gough's Cave where they are taught about stalactites and stalagmites, before being shown the remains of Cheddar Man. They are also told about cannabalism at the time. Next they are shown survival techniques of cavemen, such as the use of flint and how to make fire. Finally they are shown how given a brief history of cheese and how it is made. John and Jamie scored 47 points, while Edward and Kieron scored 44. Winners: John and Jamie Forfeit: Edward and Kieron, who had to ride in a zorb filled with curds and whey
10	5	Orkney	Barney Harwood	Sonali Shah	11 January 2013
Jedward arrive on Orkney and are first taught about the ancient burial tomb Maeshowe where they also learn about runes. Next they visit Scara Brae and learn about how Neolithic families would live before moving on to the Ring of Brodgar. They are taught about the Broch of Gurness before finally learning about Viking settlers on the island and why they moved there. John and Barney scored 22 points while Edward and Sonali scored 54 points. Winners: Edward and Sonali, who won a bonfire beach party Forfeit: John and Barney, who were covered in treacle, flour and cornflakes

=== Series 3 (2014) ===
No. overall	No. in series	Location	Team John	Team Edward	Original release date
11	1	Acton Scott	Shannon Flynn	Fergus Flanagan	20 January 2014
The twins visit Acton Scott Historical working farm to learn about rural life in Victorian times. First they learn about farm life during the time. Especially how children were used for labour instead of visiting school. Next they learn how to milk a cow, and how the spread of tuberculosis via infected milk was stopped by the process of pasteurization. The boys then are shown the tools used by a blacksmith and the processes used in metalwork at the time. They are shown how horses were used to pull ploughs and also shown the tools used by a Bodger in wood work. Finally they are taught about the importance of pigs to Victorian families. John and Shannon scored 48 points while Edward and Fergus scored 51 points. Winners: Edward and Fergus who won a picnic Forfeit: John and Shannon who had to muck out manure.
12	2	Giant's Causeway	Victoria Cook	Michelle Ackerley	21 January 2014
Next stop is Northern Ireland's Causeway Coast. First up, they learn all about the formation of Giant's Causeway and the legend of Finn McCool. Next up they learn about salmon fishing in the area and the history of the Carrick-a-Rede Rope Bridge. They then learn about the shipwreck of the Girona and the treasure that was found. Finally they are taught about Dunluce Castle. John and Victoria scored 21 points while Edward and Michelle scored 49 points. Winners: Edward and Michelle, who won Yellowman Ice Cream Forfeit: John and Victoria, who had to eat seaweed.
13	3	Bath	Kelly-Anne Lyons	Iain Stirling	22 January 2014
John and Edward have 24 hours to learn all they can about the city of Bath, first learning about the origin of the hot springs by King Bladud and next about the construction of the Roman Public Baths. They move on to learn about Bath Abbey before being taught about Georgian architecture, specifically The Circus. They are then taught about the use of the pineapple as a status symbol to the Georgians. Finally they learn about Jane Austen and her links to Bath. John and Kelly-Anne scored 38 points while Edward and Iain scored 24 points. Winners: John and Kelly-Anne, who won a spa bath. Forfeit: Edward and Iain, who had to carry John in a Sedan Chair
14	4	Blackpool	Richard Wisker	Katie Thistleton	23 January 2014
Jedward are off for a thrill ride in Blackpool Winners: Edward and Katie, who got to switch on Blackpool Illuminations Forfeit: John and Richard, who had to clean the Ballroom floor in the Blackpool Tower
15	5	Stratford Upon Avon	Bobby Lockwood	Dominique Moore	24 January 2014
The final location for the week is the birthplace of William Shakespeare, Stratford Upon Avon Winners: John and Bobby, who won a falconry experience Forfeit: Edward and Dominque, who were pelted with rotten vegetables
16	6	Hampton Court Palace Part 1	Stacey Solomon	Ben Shires	27 January 2014
The twins visit Hampton Court Palace and learn all the facts Tennis Challenge: Edward and Ben Chocolate Challenge: John and Stacey
17	7	Hampton Court Palace Part 2	Stacey Solomon	Ben Shires	28 January 2014
In the second part to their Hampton Court Palace visit, the teams turn tour guide. Maze Challenge: Edward and Ben Archery Challenge: John and Stacey Winners: John and Stacey, who won a ride on a segway Forfeit: Edward and Ben who had to tidy the bins
18	8	Oxford Part 1	Jade Ewen	Matt Johnson	29 January 2014
The final destination for the series is Oxford 4 minute mile Challenge: John and Jade Croquet Challenge: John and Jade
19	9	Oxford Part 2	Jade Ewen	Matt Johnson	30 January 2014
The teams teach the tourists all that they've learnt Boat Race Challenge: John and Jade Toy Car Race Challenge: Edward and Matt Winners: John and Jade got to ride in a Punt Forfeit: Edward and Matt were locked up in Oxford Prison
20	10	The Jedawards	TBA	TBA	31 January 2014
John and Edward look back at their favourite moments from the series
