= Liam's Story =

- Title card
- Genre: Children; Comedy drama
- Theme music composer: Jeremy Howlland-Smith
- Composer: Simon Rogers
- Country of origin: United Kingdom
- No. of series: 1
- No. of episodes: 10

Production
- Producer: Simon Nelson
- Running time: 2-3 minutes (Individual webisodes); 28 minutes (TV version)

Original release
- Network: CBBC
- Release: 23 March 2014

Related
- The Story of Tracy Beaker; Tracy Beaker Returns; The Dumping Ground

Liam's Story is a television spin-off of the children television series The Dumping Ground. It is a 10 part web-series that was made available on The Dumping Ground website after series 2, episode 3 had aired and continued being released up to episode 12. The webisodes were also aired on CBBC Channel as a 28-minute story on 23 March 2014.

== Cast ==
- Liam O'Donovan - played by Richard Wisker
- Jack O’Donovan - played by Chris Finch
- Poppy Ho - played by Shorelle Hepkin
- PA - played by Jade Byrne
- Stevie - played by Dean Bone
- Dave - played by Drew Horsley
- Engineer - played by Adam Henderson Scott
- Mo Michaels - played by Reece Buttery

== Episodes ==
=== Webisodes (2014) ===
No.	Title	Directed by	Written by	Original release date
1	"Webisode 1"	Jermain Julien	Matt Evans	17 January 2014
2	"Webisode 2"	Jermain Julien	Matt Evans	23 January 2014
3	"Webisode 3"	Jermain Julien	Matt Evans	31 January 2014
4	"Webisode 4"	Jermain Julien	Matt Evans	7 February 2014
5	"Webisode 5"	Jermain Julien	Matt Evans	14 February 2014
6	"Webisode 6"	Jermain Julien	Matt Evans	17 February 2014
7	"Webisode 7"	Jermain Julien	Matt Evans	21 February 2014
8	"Webisode 8"	Jermain Julien	Matt Evans	28 February 2014
9	"Webisode 9"	Jermain Julien	Matt Evans	7 March 2014
10	"Webisode 10"	Jermain Julien	Matt Evans	14 March 2014

=== Television (2014) ===
No.	Title	Directed by	Written by	Original release date
1	"Liam's Story"	Jermain Julien	Matt Evans	23 March 2014
