= Penance (British TV series) =

- Based on: Penance
- Written by: Kate O'Riordan; Ben Morris
- Directed by: Maurice Sweeney
- Starring: Julie Graham; Neil Morrissey; Tallulah Greive; Art Malik; Nico Mirallegro
- Country of origin: United Kingdom
- Original language: English
- No. of series: 1
- No. of episodes: 3

Production
- Executive producers: Jonathan Fisher; Ingrid Goodwin
- Producer: Alex Jones

Original release
- Network: Channel 5
- Release: 17 March – 19 March 2020

Penance is a three-episode drama film first broadcast by Britain's free-to-air Channel 5.

== Cast ==
- Julie Graham as Rosalie Douglas
- Neil Morrissey as Luke Douglas
- Tallulah Greive as Maddie Douglas
- Art Malik as Father Tom Hayes
- Nico Mirallegro as Jed Cousins
- Wanda Ventham as Fay Douglas

== Plot summary ==
Rosalie and Luke are a well-to-do estranged couple whose son was found dead in Thailand. They are introduced to Jed, whose parents died in an auto accident, and are sympathetic. Jed inveigles his way into the household as a gardener, then takes over the son's bedroom. She becomes infatuated and eventually succumbs to his advances. She discovers he is a thief and responsible for her son's death. She lures him to a remote location where, after a scuffle involving her husband, she stabs him with a kitchen knife.

== Home media ==
Penance has been released on DVD by Acorn DVD and distributed by Madman Entertainment.

== Reception ==
- Rotten Tomatoes gave the series a 71% rating, indicating general approval. O'Riordan's writing and Graham's acting were praised.
