= Flesh and Blood (TV series) =

British television family drama series

- Created by: Sarah Williams
- Directed by: Louise Hooper
- Composer: Dan Jones
- Country of origin: United Kingdom
- Original language: English
- No. of seasons: 1
- No. of episodes: 4

Production
- Executive producers: Kate Bartlett; Susanne Simpson; Sarah Williams; Polly Hill
- Producer: Letitia Knight
- Cinematography: Oli Russell
- Editor: Edel McDonnell

Original release
- Network: ITV
- Release: February 2020 – 2020

Flesh and Blood is a British four-episode thriller television series created by Sarah Williams and directed by Louise Hooper. It first aired on ITV in February 2020. The ensemble cast includes Imelda Staunton, Francesca Annis, Stephen Rea, Russell Tovey, and Claudie Blakley.

== Cast ==
=== Main ===
- Imelda Staunton as Mary
- Francesca Annis as Vivien
- Russell Tovey as Jake
- Claudie Blakley as Helen
- Lydia Leonard as Natalie
- Keir Charles as George
- Sharon Small as Stella
- Vincent Regan as Tony
- Lara Rossi as Leila
- David Bamber as DI Doug Lineham
- Stephen Rea as Mark

=== Supporting ===
- Karan Gill as PC Isaac Cory
- Mia Lloyd as Maddie
- Ayden Beale as Aaron
- Grace Hogg-Robinson as Lily
- Pamela Nomvete as Julianne
- Clara Indrani as Meera
- Stephanie Langton as Carla

== Production ==
Filming took place in the coastal village of Pevensey Bay, near Eastbourne in England.
