= Grace Hogg-Robinson =

Actress

- Born: Grace Emily Hogg-Robinson; 18 March 1996 (age 30); High Wycombe, England
- Years active: 2014–present

Grace Emily Hogg-Robinson (born 18 March 1996) is an English actress. On television, she is known for her roles in the BBC series The Coroner (2015–2016), Flatmates (2019–2021) and The Other Bennet Sister (2026), and the Sky One series COBRA (2020–2021).

== Early life ==
Hogg-Robinson was born in High Wycombe. She attended Wycombe High School and took part in the school's chamber choir. She trained at the Jackie Palmer Stage School, and was a member of the local Lane End Players theatre group.

== Career ==
After making her television debut with guest appearances in Suspects and Casualty, Hogg-Robinson had her first main television role in the 2015 BBC One drama The Coroner as the titular coroner Jane Kennedy's (Claire Goose) daughter Beth, a character Hogg-Robinson would play for both series. In 2016, she appeared in the Sky Atlantic comedy miniseries Camping as Catherine. She made her professional stage debut on the Paines Plough tour of Broken Biscuits.

Hogg-Robinson made her feature film debut in the 2018 drama Two for Joy, went on the Dr Jekyll & Mr Hyde tour, and starred in Katherine Parkinson's Sitting at the 2018 Edinburgh Fringe Festival, followed by a run at the Arcola Theatre in London. Visual artist Roxana Halls did paintings of the Sitting cast, including one of Hogg-Robinson as Cassandra. Hogg-Robinson also played Hermione in the Trojan War series Troy: Fall of a City on BBC One and Netflix, and Netflix and Chelsea in the second series of the BBC Three mockumentary Pls Like, and appeared in the likes of Silent Witness, also on BBC One, and Defending the Guilty on BBC Two.

In 2019, Hogg-Robinson began playing Mel in the BBC iPlayer comedy-drama series Flatmates and appeared in the coming-of-age film Days of the Bagnold Summer. This was followed by roles as Ruth in the BBC Two comedy The First Team, Lily in the ITV thriller Flesh and Blood, and Tess Marshall in the Sky One series COBRA. She returned to the stage in 2021 when she made her West End debut in The Ocean at the End of the Lane at the Duke of York's Theatre. She starred in The Snail House at Hampstead Theatre the following year.

== Personal life ==
On the side, Hogg-Robinson runs a small art business called She Hoggs the Paint.

== Filmography ==
=== Film ===
Year	Title	Role	Notes
2014	Birdhouse	Hannah	Short films
2016	Love	Kate	Short films
2016	Candy Floss	Jasmine	Short films
2018	The Nest	Mia, Shop Girl	Short films
2018	Two for Joy	Natalie	
2019	Days of the Bagnold Summer	Katie	
2023	Borne	Kate	Short film

=== Television ===
Year	Title	Role	Notes
2014	Suspects	Daughter	Episode: "Eyes Closed". Uncredited role
2014	Casualty	Rosie Culpepper	Series 28; Episode 42
2015–2016	The Coroner	Beth Kennedy	20 episodes
2016	Doctors	Willow Cobb	Episode: "A Conscious Uncoupling"
2016	Camping	Catherine	Mini-series; Episode 5
2018	Silent Witness	Mel McMorris	Episode: "Family"
2018	Troy: Fall of a City	Hermione	2 episodes
2018	Mum	Danielle	Episode: "June"
2018	The Durrells	Nelly	Series 3; Episode 6
2018	Pls Like	Chelsea	3 episodes
2018–2019	Defending the Guilty	Gracie	2 episodes
2019	Casualty	Angela Crewe	Series 33; Episode 31
2019–2021	Flatmates	Mel	18 episodes (series 1–2)
2020	The Beast Will Rise		Web monologue
2020	The First Team	Ruth	3 episodes
2020	Flesh and Blood	Lily	Mini-series; 4 episodes
2020–2021	COBRA	Tess Marshall	7 episodes (series 1–2)
2020–2023	There She Goes	Caroline	2 episodes
2022	Vera	Zara Swann	Episode: "As the Crow Flies"
2023	Doctors	Lily Madden	Episode: "Fresh Meat"
2024	An American in Austen	Lydia	Television film
2024	Bangmouth Village	Gemma	Pilot/miniseries
2026	The Other Bennet Sister	Lydia Wickham (née Bennet)	Television Series
2026	Miss Scarlet and The Duke	Isabelle Summers	Series 6

=== Video games ===
Year	Title	Voice role	Notes
2019	Another Eden: The Cat Beyond Time and Space	Alma	English version
2019	Arknights	Kroos	English version
2019	Tom Clancy's Ghost Recon Breakpoint	Ruby Mackenzie	
2022	Xenoblade Chronicles 3	Panacea	English version
2023	The Talos Principle 2	Miranda	

== Stage ==
Year	Title	Role	Notes
2016	Broken Biscuits	Holly	Paines Plough tour
2018	Dr Jekyll & Mr Hyde	Annie	Rose Theatre Kingston / tour
2018, 2019	Sitting	Cassandra	Edinburgh Fringe Festival / Arcola Theatre, London
2021	The Ocean at the End of the Lane	Sis	Duke of York's Theatre, London
2022	The Snail House	Sarah	Hampstead Theatre, London
