= Royal Russell School =

Location
- Coombe Lane; Croydon, London, CR9 5BX; England
- Coordinates: 51°21′27″N 0°03′58″W

Information
- Type: Independent day and boarding school
- Motto: Non sibi sed omnibus (Not for oneself but for all)
- Established: 1853; 173 years ago
- Local authority: Croydon
- Headmaster: Chris J. Hutchinson
- Gender: Mixed
- Age: 3 to 19
- Enrolment: 1225 (2025)
- Capacity: 1250
- Houses: Senior school Madden; Cambridge; Oxford; St Andrews; Keable; Hollenden; Buchanan; Reade; Queens; Latessa
- Colour: Maroon
- Publication: ROGUE
- Former pupils: Old Russellians
- Patron: Elizabeth II
- Website: www.royalrussell.co.uk

Royal Russell School (before 1962, the Royal Warehousemen Clerks and Drapers' Schools; before 1953, the Warehousemen Clerks and Drapers' Schools; before 1895, the Warehousemen and Clerks' Schools for Orphan and Necessitous Children) is an independent school in the Shirley area of Croydon, South London. It is a co-educational day and boarding school. The motto of the school is Non sibi sed omnibus meaning "Not for one's self but for all". The school is a member of the Headmasters' and Headmistresses' Conference. The patron of the school was Queen Elizabeth II.

There are 1225 pupils at the Royal Russell School, aged between 3 and 19. The school occupies a site of over 100 acres (0.40 km^{2}) in gardens in a wooded estate two miles south-east of Croydon. The School moved the boys' part of the school from Russell Hill in Purley to the Ballards site in 1924, then moving the girls' section of the school completely to the Ballards site in 1961, and selling the original school site on Russell Hill in Purley in 1961. The Junior and Lower Junior schools are in separate buildings from the Senior School, but are on the same site.

== History ==
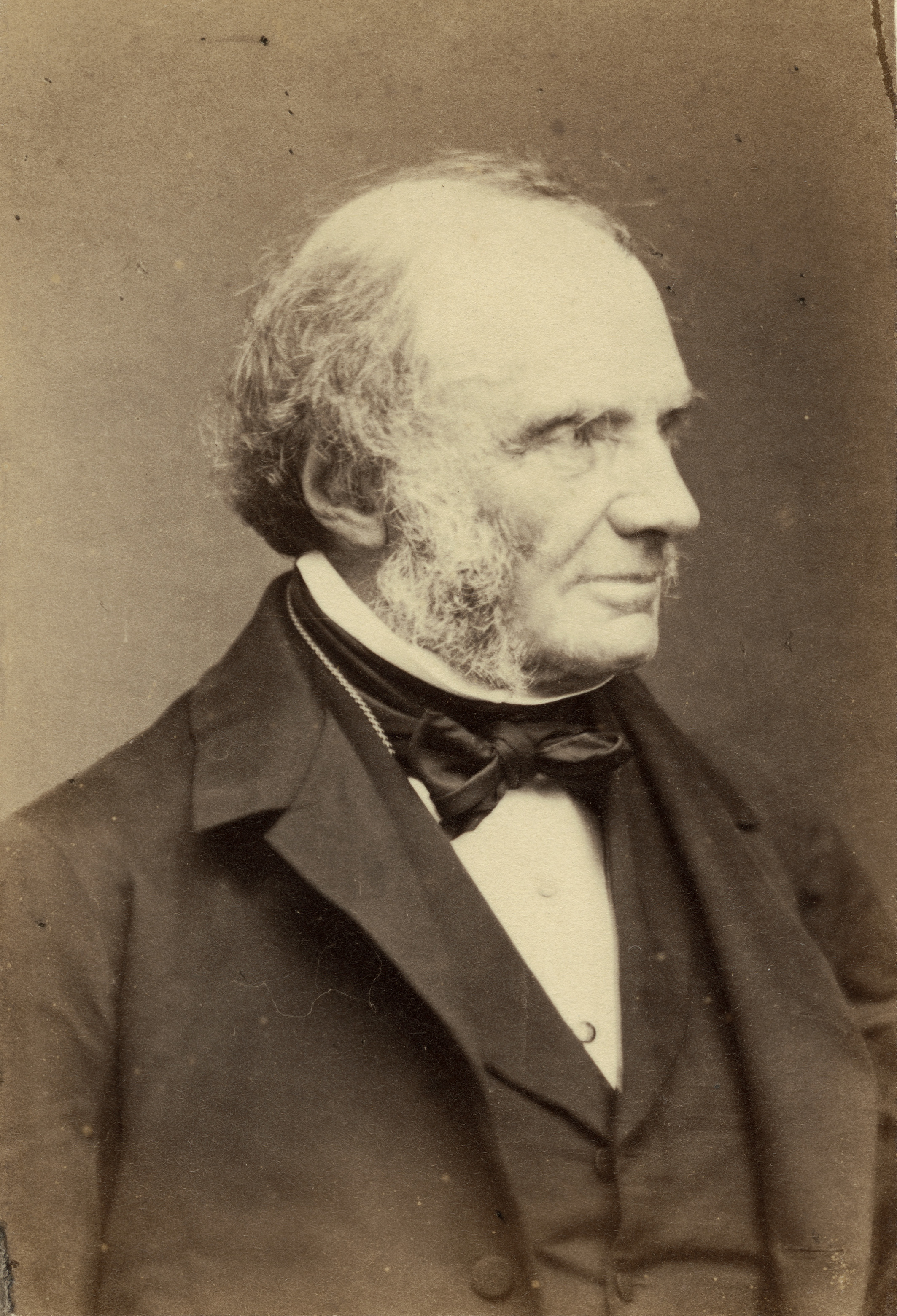
Lord John Russell, the school's first president

In 1924 the school moved to its present site two miles (3 km) south-east of Croydon within the ancient (and ecclesiastical) parish of Addington, taking over a 110-acre (0.45 km^{2}) lightly wooded estate. The school is affiliated to the Church of England, but pupils of all faiths are admitted.

The school has had royal patronage from its early days and Queen Elizabeth II visited the school on four occasions. Her first visit was in 1950 as Princess Elizabeth; in 1963 she opened Cambridge House and the Practical Block: she joined the celebrations of 125 years in 1979 and the sesquicentenary in 2003.

The school is now independent of the Warehousemen, Clerks and Drapers livery companies and operates as a charity under the direction of its own board of governors. There is an IAPS Junior School and HMC Senior School on the one hundred acre estate.

In 2003 the school held celebrations to mark its sesquicentennial year, being commemorated by Queen Elizabeth II visiting the school to open the library and Sixth Form Centre. In 2010 Prince Edward, Earl of Wessex (now the Duke of Edinburgh) visited the school, officially opening the Performing Arts Centre.

=== Academic ===
The most recent ISI report, carried out in 2016, assessed the school in ten specific areas on a three-point scale: unsatisfactory, satisfactory and good. In certain circumstances if the lead inspector decides that the standard exceeds those set nationally then an 'excellent' grading can be given. The inspection lasted from March 15 to March 18 (three days), and in all 10 categories tested Royal Russell School achieved an 'excellent' grading.

Royal Russell's boarding provision was inspected as part of a three-year cycle by Ofsted in which inspectors spent three days reviewing the boarding provision. The school received a 'good' classification in each of the six categories inspected.

== Extra-curricular activities ==
The school teaches music, drama and art. The Drama department have their own drama studios and a purpose-built theatre. It regularly holds school plays. The music department have facilities including a recording studio and practice rooms. There are facilities for sports and games, including a large sports hall, gymnasium, indoor swimming pool, tennis courts, and floodlit pitches. Other facilities include a prep library, senior library and sixth form study centre and sixth form cafe.

=== Royal Russell School Model United Nations ===
The school is involved in the Model United Nations (MUN) encouraging students from year 9 onwards to join. The School's MUN holds regular meetings and debates at least once a week on global issues. The school holds an annual four-day international MUN conference in October; it first held a Model United Nations conference in 1981.

=== Royal Russell Combined Cadet Force ===
The school has a contingent of the Combined Cadet Force with an Army section (affiliated to the Royal Electrical and Mechanical Engineers) and an RAF section. The CCF teaches leadership to cadets, and other skills and qualifications. Formal qualifications include the BTEC Diploma in Public Services run via the Cadet Vocational Qualifications Organisation (CVQO).

== Alumni ==
Notable Old Russellians include:

- Ali M. Ansari - Professor in Modern History at the University of St. Andrews
- Martin Clunes - Actor
- Tyrique George - Footballer for Chelsea and England U21s
- Elly Jackson - Vocalist of the musical duo La Roux
- Naoko Mori - Actor
- Neville Keighley - Singer/songwriter who uses the stage name Belouis Some
- Mims Davies - Conservative Politician
- Mya-Lecia Naylor - Actress
- Rhys Norrington-Davies - Footballer
