= Acting age =

Age range an actor can portray

Acting age is an age, or range of ages, that an actor lists on their résumé. It is not a claim to an actual chronological age, but a suggestion as to what age or ages the actor considers themselves capable of credibly portraying. Casting directors may also give age ranges when writing casting calls for a role.

== Notable examples ==
- Stacey Dash, who played a 17-year-old in both the movie and TV versions of Clueless until the age of 32.
- Estelle Getty, who played the mother of Beatrice Arthur's character Dorothy Zbornak on The Golden Girls who was actually younger than Arthur.
- Sidney Poitier played a teenager in Blackboard Jungle when he was 28.
- Gabrielle Carteris played a 16- to 21-year-old on Beverly Hills, 90210 when she was ages 29 to 34.
- Tom Welling played a young 14- to 24-year-old Clark Kent on Smallville when he was 24 to 34 years old.
- Ralph Macchio played high school teenager Daniel LaRusso in The Karate Kid films when he was in his 20s.
- Rachel McAdams played teenage mean girl Regina George in Mean Girls at the age of between 23 and 25.

== See also ==
- Dawson casting
