= Millie Inbetween =

British television series

- Created by: Elaine Sperber; Gary Parker; Matthew Leys; Will Ing
- Starring: Millie Innes; Tallulah Greive; Hannah Jane Fox; James Bachman; Jeremy Edwards; Theo Stevenson; Jaye Jacobs; Mya-Lecia Naylor; Marley Lockhart; Richard Lumsden; Richard Wisker; Llewella Gideon; Oscar Morgan
- Opening theme: Millie Inbetween Theme Tune
- Country of origin: United Kingdom
- Original language: English
- No. of series: 5
- No. of episodes: 56 (list of episodes)

Production
- Producers: Ali Bryer Carron; Fraser MacDonald; Elaine Sperber; Mellisa Hardinge; Jeffrey Sherriff; Vince Poper; Alan Levy; Millie Innes
- Production locations: Dumbarton, Dunbartonshire, Scotland; BBC Pacific Quay; Northern Ireland
- Running time: 30 minutes
- Production company: Zodiak Kids Studios UK (Note: Known as The Foundation for its first two series)

Original release
- Network: CBBC
- Release: 1 October 2014 – 12 December 2018

Related
- Flatmates

Millie Inbetween is a British children's sitcom series broadcast on CBBC and starring Millie Innes. The first episode premiered on 1 October 2014, with the final episode airing on 12 December 2018. It focuses on 12-year-old Millie and her 15-year-old sister whose parents have recently split up. In August 2019, Richard Wisker confirmed that he, Tallulah Greive and Theo Stevenson would reprise their roles from Millie Inbetween in an iPlayer sitcom Flatmates, aimed at an older audience.

== Production ==
In March 2014, BBC commissioned a new 13-part series called The Millie Show. The show name was then changed to Millie Inbetween. It was filmed in Dumbarton, Scotland at the River City Studios, in Northern Ireland in the BBC Blackstaff Studio Complex, and at local locations that resemble Glasgow.

== Plot ==
=== Series 1 ===
Millie McDonald (Millie Innes) is a 12-year-old girl who lives with her 15-year-old sister Lauren McDonald (Tallulah Greive). Their parents have split up, so the two sisters are constantly swapping living with 'Mum' Sharon, (Hannah Jane Fox) and 'Dad' Tony (James Bachman, later Richard Lumsden). Millie loves the upsides of her new family set-up; two Christmas celebrations, two birthdays, and two bedrooms. However, the downsides are more tricky to come to terms with, as her parents start new relationships. The parents' new partners have children, too - and they all want to move in. Sharon has a new partner called Mike (Jeremy Edwards), who has a son called Craig (Theo Stevenson), who is a nightmare. Tony meets a new partner called Amber (Jaye Jacobs), who has 2 children called Fran (Mya-Lecia Naylor) and Jake (Marley Lockhart).

=== Series 2 ===
Great Aunt Gloria visits, still convinced Sharon and Tony (now played by Richard Lumsden) are still married, Millie celebrates her 13th birthday, Lauren trains for a hike with the school, Millie and Fran go head to head in a spelling-bee, Craig goes to stay with his mum at Christmas when he feels left out at home, Jake and Fran's dad turns up at the flat, Mum loses her job at Sunnyshopper, Mum decides to get tips off of Amber to try to be cool, Millie's English teacher arrives at the house to talk about Millie's poem, Lauren gets all loved up with Craig's new mate, Justin, Tony and Amber split but soon get back together, Jake bonds with Craig after Mike forces Craig to look after him, Mike proposes to Sharon and the whole family go on a camping trip together.

=== Series 3 ===
Tony and Amber are moving to a bigger flat while Craig has a new mate, Millie tries to be bad in order to go to a party, Amber announces she is pregnant, Millie's grandparents unexpectedly turn up on Christmas Day, Mike loses his job at the gym and is too scared to tell Sharon, Millie needs to start thinking about her subject choices at school, Fran gets a temporary tattoo much to the horror of Amber, it is Father's Day and Tony thinks Millie and Lauren have forgotten about him, the house goes electricity free for a week, Millie, Lauren and Craig want to be home alone so they send Mum and Mike to Dad and Amber's flat, Millie fakes a boyfriend to get the attention of Lauren, Mum and Mike eventually get married and Amber gives birth to a baby boy named Hector.

=== Series 4 ===
Craig moves out to go to college and Lauren meets a boy named Declan (Richard Wisker), who later becomes her boyfriend. Dad and Amber move to Spain, so Fran and Jake are looked after by their grandma, Flora(Llewella Gideon). Millie tries to befriend a girl, Jessie (Rhianna Merralls) in her maths class who is a 'wild' girl. Meanwhile, Mike’s nephew, Leo (Oscar Morgan), moves into the house. Lauren deletes her social media after a message mix-up and Mum and Mike spark concern when they start to argue. Millie ends a feud between Fran and Jake. Jessie is having trouble at home so Millie tries to help her and Millie starts blogging to give advice to parents. At the end of that series, Lauren leaves to start college and Millie has to decide between her Mum or Dad's holiday. She picks neither of them and decides to volunteer and help in Kenya. Also, as well as Lauren leaving, so does Leo.

Due to Jaye Jacobs returning to Holby City, she became a recurring cast member. Innes served as an associate producer.

=== Series 5 Specials ===
Declan and Dad each drop a bombshell and everyone's future is turned upside down. Millie and Craig travel to Spain in a mission. Craig and Millie race against time to try and save her dad's job.

== Cast ==
Actor	Character	Series				
Actor	Character	1	2	3	4	5 Specials
Millie Innes	Millie	Main	Main	Main	Main	Main
Tallulah Greive	Lauren	Main	Main	Main	Main	Main
Hannah Jane Fox	Sharon	Main	Main	Main	Main	Main
James Bachman	Tony	Main	—N/a	—N/a	—N/a	—N/a
Richard Lumsden	Tony	—N/a	Main	Main	Recurring	Main
Jeremy Edwards	Mike	Main	Main	Main	Main	Main
Jaye Jacobs	Amber	Main	Main	Main	Recurring	Main
Theo Stevenson	Craig	Main	Main	Main	Recurring	Main
Mya-Lecia Naylor	Fran	Main	Main	Main	Main	Main
Marley Lockhart	Jake	Main	Main	Main	Main	Main
Richard Wisker	Declan	—N/a	—N/a	—N/a	Main	Main
Llewella Gideon	Flora	—N/a	—N/a	—N/a	Recurring	Main
Oscar Morgan	Leo	—N/a	—N/a	—N/a	Main	—N/a
Rhianna Merralls	Jessie	—N/a	—N/a	—N/a	Recurring	—N/a
Natasha Wisniewska	Girl on Bus / Supergirl at Party	—N/a	—N/a	Recurring	Recurring	—N/a

== Episodes ==
Series	Episodes	Originally released	
Series	Episodes	First released	Last released
1	13	26 September 2014	17 December 2014
2	15	19 November 2015	5 April 2016
3	12	20 December 2016	14 March 2017
4	12	1 January 2018	16 March 2018
5	3	10 December 2018	12 December 2018
