= Jaye Jacobs =

British actress

- Born: Emma Jaye Jacobs; 27 May 1982 (age 44); Bristol, England
- Occupation: Actress
- Years active: 2003–present

Emma Jaye Jacobs (born 27 May 1982), known professionally as Jaye Jacobs, is an English actress. She is best known for playing the role of Donna Jackson in BBC medical drama series Holby City (2004-2011, 2017-2022) and Casualty (2023).

Jacobs also portrayed deputy headteacher and science teacher, Sian Diamond in the BBC school-based drama series, Waterloo Road (2011-2013).

== Early life ==
Jacobs was born in Bristol and grew up in Somerset. She was educated at Crispin School, where she became deputy head girl. She attended dance classes at the Joy Tinney School of dancing, where she landed several roles in their yearly musical, including the Lion in The Wizard of Oz. She subsequently trained at the Arts Educational School in London.

== Career ==
In 2003, Jacobs played Alice in the EastEnders spin-off Perfectly Frank.

In 2004, Jacobs joined the cast of the BBC medical drama series Holby City as fun-loving nurse, turned Ward Sister, Donna Jackson. In 2011, Jacobs left the show and the role of Donna Jackson. She reprised her role in June 2017.

In Autumn 2005, Jacobs appeared in the third series of Strictly Come Dancing, dancing with professional partner Andrew Cuerden. However, the couple were eliminated in the second week of the contest and finished in 11th place on the show.

Soon after leaving Holby City, it was announced Jacobs had joined the cast of the BBC school drama Waterloo Road as new Deputy Headteacher and Science Teacher Sian Diamond in the seventh series. In 2012, Jacobs decided to leave the show and made her last appearance on 28 February 2013.

From October 2014 – March 2018, Jacobs played the role of Amber on CBBC children's television program Millie Inbetween. However, due to her return to Holby City, she served as a recurring character in the fourth series.

In 2015, Jacobs appeared in an episode of the ITV drama Midsomer Murders as Police Constable Carolyn Florrie. She voiced Amaya in the fifth episode of the video game Game of Thrones.

In 2022, it was announced that Jacobs would play one of the presenters in the world premiere of Great British Bake Off: The Musical.

In March 2023, it was announced that Jacobs would be reprising her role of Donna Jackson in Holby City's sister show, Casualty, alongside a new cohort of nurses introduced to the show."
