= Hannah Jane Fox =

British actress

- Born: 13 January 1976 (age 50); Enfield, London, England
- Other name: Hannah-Jane Fox
- Education: Mountview Academy of Theatre Arts
- Height: 5' 2''

Hannah Jane Fox (born 13 January 1976) is an English theatre and television actress. She is best known for playing the leading female role of Scaramouche in the original West End production of the Queen jukebox musical We Will Rock You.

== Education ==
Fox is an alumna of Mountview Academy of Theatre Arts, graduating in 1997.

== Career ==
=== Theatre ===
Fox's first professional role after graduating was Columbia in The Rocky Horror Show (1997) at The English Theatre Frankfurt, Germany. She then joined the original London productions of Rent (1998) at the Shaftesbury Theatre, understudying Maureen, and Taboo (2002) at The Venue, playing Virus.

In 2002 Fox was cast as Scaramouche in the original production of We Will Rock You at the Dominion Theatre, playing the role for four years. She featured on the live cast recording, and sang the role alongside Brian May and Roger Taylor at the Party at the Palace, a concert to commemorate the Golden Jubilee of Elizabeth II at Buckingham Palace.

Fox also played the title role in Hackney Empire's Dick Whittington (2008), the Wicked Queen in Snow White and the Seven Dwarves at the Gordon Craig Theatre (winning Best Female Villain at the 2019 Pantomime Awards), Twiggy's mother in Close Up: The Twiggy Musical at the Menier Chocolate Factory (2023), and Felicia Taylor in Kathy and Stella Solve a Murder! (2024) at the Ambassadors Theatre, London.

=== Television ===
Fox played the role of Sharon, the mother of the title character, in CBBC sitcom Millie Inbetween (2014–2018). She has also appeared in several television series created by We Will Rock You writer Ben Elton, including the roles of Vicky in Blessed (2005), Cheryl in The Wright Way (2013), and Mrs. Scratchit in Upstart Crow (2018). Her guest television appearances include episodes of The Bill, EastEnders and Call the Midwife.
