= Richard Wisker =

English actor (born 1995)

- Born: Richard David Kevin Wisker; 1 February 1995 (age 31); Dagenham, East London, England
- Occupations: Actor; television presenter
- Years active: 2008–present

Richard David Kevin Wisker (born 1 February 1995) is an English actor and television presenter, best known for his role as Liam O'Donovan in Tracy Beaker Returns (2010–2012). He also portrayed Rich in the CBBC series Dani's Castle (2013–2015) and Declan in Millie Inbetween (2017–2018) and its spin-off Flatmates (2019–2021). Between 2011 and 2015, he was a presenter on Friday Download.

== Life and career ==
Richard David Kevin Wisker was born on 1 February 1995 in Dagenham, East London. made his television debut in 2008 as a guest star on the British police drama The Bill, playing Mason Kemble in a two-episode story called "Hold Me Tight". He later returned to television as Jono Blake in an episode of Law & Order: UK. He also guest-starred in The Sarah Jane Adventures in 2010, in two episodes titled "Lost in Time", featuring a character named George Woods, from the year 1941. His most notable role is Liam O'Donovan in the CBBC drama Tracy Beaker Returns, which he portrayed from 2010 to 2012, and later reprised the role for the show's spin-off The Dumping Ground in 2013 and 2019 respectively. He also starred in Liam's Story a spin-off based on the character's life after he moves in with his brother.

In 2010, Wisker was nominated for a children's BAFTA for Best Actor.

In May 2011, Wisker began presenting Friday Download on the CBBC Channel, a children's entertainment series alongside Georgia Lock, Dionne Bromfield, Cel Spellman, Tyger Drew-Honey and Aidan Davis. It has so far spanned nine series.

In March 2012, Wisker released his debut single and held a signing at Stratford Centre.

From 2013 to 2015, Wisker portrayed Rich in CBBC comedy Dani's Castle.

He has a starring role in the film Up All Night based on the CBBC show Friday Download. In 2017 Wisker announced he would be starring as the lead in the film Supernova by Noveray Limited. The star filmed himself flying into Monaco to sign the deal.

In July 2023, Wisker joined OnlyFans.

== Filmography ==
Year	Title	Role	Note
2008	The Bill	Mason Kemble	Two episodes
2009	COI Cyber Bullying	Bully	
2009	Law & Order: UK	Jono Blake	One episode
2010	The Sarah Jane Adventures	George Woods	Episode: "Lost in Time"
2010–2012	Tracy Beaker Returns	Liam O'Donovan	Regular role.
2011–2012	Tracy Beaker Survival Files	Liam O'Donovan	Regular role.
2011–2015	Friday Download	Himself	Presenter
2012–2013	All Over The Place	Himself	Co-Presenter
2012	12 Again	Himself	Guest Appearance
2012	Stepping Up	Luca Wilby II	One episode.
2012-2014	Jedward's Big Adventure	Himself	Guest Appearance; three episodes
2013–2015	Dani's Castle	Rich	Main Role
2014	Dani's Castle	Diego	Guest Role
2014	Casualty	Daniel Pemberley	One episode
2014	Liam's Story	Liam O'Donovan	Online webisodes, reprising role from Tracy Beaker Returns
2014, 2018	The Dumping Ground	Liam O'Donovan	Episodes: Face the Music & Missing Presumed Single, reprising role from Tracy Beaker Returns
2015	Up All Night	Himself	
2015	Rise of the Footsoldier Part II	Nicky	
2017–2018	Millie Inbetween	Declan	Regular Role
2019–2021	Flatmates	Declan	Main Role
