= Child actor =

Child acting on stage or in motion pictures or television

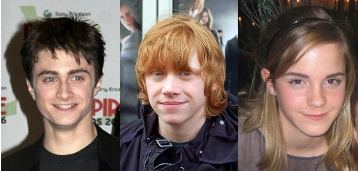
Daniel Radcliffe, Rupert Grint and Emma Watson rose to prominence as child actors in the Harry Potter movies

A child actor or child actress is a child acting on stage, television or in movies. An adult who began their acting career as a child may also be called a child actor or a "former child actor". Closely associated terms include teenage actor or teen actor, which refer to an actor who gained popularity as a teenager.

Many child actors find themselves struggling to adapt as they become adults, mainly due to typecasting. For example, several of the popular Our Gang kids of the 1920s and 1930s, including Mickey Daniels, George "Spanky" McFarland, and Carl "Alfalfa" Switzer, struggled as adults and never achieved sustained adult acting careers. Macaulay Culkin and Lindsay Lohan are two more recent child actors who eventually experienced much difficulty with the fame they acquired at an early age.

A relatively small number of child actors have gone on to successful acting careers as adults; for example Mickey Rooney, Jackie Cooper, Elizabeth Taylor, Robert Blake, Dean Stockwell, Jodie Foster, Diane Lane, Christian Bale, Drew Barrymore, Saoirse Ronan and Natalie Portman. Other child actors have gone on to successful careers in other fields, including ambassador Shirley Temple, director Ron Howard, politicians Lech and Jarosław Kaczyński, businessman James Jebbia, and singer Jenny Lewis.

== Regulation ==
In the United States, the activities of child actors are regulated by the governing labor union, if any, and state laws. Due to high propensity of filming in California, the state requires professionals who work with child performers to obtain a Child Performer Services Permit and are required to register with the State Department of Industrial Relations. Some projects film in distant locations specifically to evade regulations intended to protect the child. Longer work hours or risky stunts prohibited by California, for example, might be permitted to a project filming in British Columbia. US federal law "specifically exempted minors working in the entertainment business from all provisions of the child labor laws." Any regulation of child actors is governed by disparate state laws.

=== California ===
Due to the large presence of the entertainment industry in Hollywood, the state of California has some of the most explicit laws protecting child actors. Being a minor, a child actor must secure an entertainment work permit before accepting any paid work. Compulsory education laws mandate that the education of the child actor not be disrupted while the child is working, whether the child actor is enrolled in public school, private school or even home school. The child does their schoolwork under the supervision of a studio teacher while on the set.

In addition, the Coogan Bill also mandates child actor's employer to set aside 15% of the earnings in a trust to safeguard a portion of their earnings for when they reach the age of majority; such bill was in response to the plight of Jackie Coogan, who earned millions of dollars as a successful child actor of the silent film era, only to discover upon reaching adulthood that his mother and stepfather had spent almost all of his money.

=== United Kingdom ===
In the United Kingdom, a child actor is defined as an actor under school leaving age. Before a child can work, they require a performance license from their Local Education Authority as well as a licensed chaperone. A child does not need a chaperone if they are being cared for by a parent who has parental responsibility for them or by a teacher who would ordinarily provide their education. A chaperone's duties include acting in loco parentis and recording arrival and departure times from the place of performance; chaperones are often asked to monitor and record all the times a child is working, having a break, or being tutored. The standard rule is that children must receive three hours of tutoring on every school day in periods of at least 30 minutes. Children pursuing higher education do not need to have a license, as such education is deemed voluntary. They may still need to seek permission from their school or college if they are likely to miss lessons, however.

There are regulations and guidance to safeguard all actors under the age of 20; Ofcom guidance states a child or young person's health and safety, well-being and welfare are paramount in television production and factors such as their age, maturity and life experiences can affect their performance. Ofcom also advises that broadcasters undertake risk assessments, consider seeking expert advice and follow best practices.

== Issues ==
=== Ownership of earnings ===
In the United States before the 1930s, many child actors never got to see the money they earned because they were not in charge of this money. Jackie Coogan earned millions of dollars from working as a child actor only to see most of it squandered by his parents. In 1939, California weighed in on this controversy and enacted the Coogan Bill, which requires a portion of the earnings of a child to be preserved in a special savings account called a blocked trust. A trust that is not actively monitored can also be problematic, however, as in the case of Gary Coleman, who after working from 1974, later sued his adoptive parents and former business advisor for $3.8 million over misappropriation of his trust fund.

=== Competitive pressure ===
Some people, such as child psychologists, developmental experts, and journalists, also criticize the parents of child actors for allowing their children to work, believing that more "normal" activities should be the staple during the childhood years. Other industry advocates observe that competition is present in all areas of a child's life—from sports to student newspaper to orchestra and band—and believe that the work ethic instilled or the talent developed accrues to the child's benefit.

The child actor may experience unique and negative pressures when working under tight production schedules. Large projects which depend for their success on the ability of the child to deliver an effective performance add to the pressure.

Ethel Merman, who several times worked in long-running stage productions with child actors, disliked what she eventually saw as their over-professionalization—"acting more like midgets than children"—and disapproved of parents pushing adulthood on them .

== After the childhood success ==
There are many instances of troubled adult lives due to the stressful environment to which child actors are subjected. It is common to see a child actor grow up in front of the camera, whether in films, television shows or both. However, it is not uncommon to see child actors continue their careers as actors or in a different professional field.

Jodie Foster started acting at age 3, becoming the quintessential child actor during the 1970s with roles in films such as Tom Sawyer (1973), Alice Doesn't Live Here Anymore (1974), Taxi Driver (1976), Bugsy Malone (1976), The Little Girl Who Lives Down the Lane (1976), and Freaky Friday (1976). A child prodigy, Foster received her first Academy Award nomination at age 13 and later took a sabbatical from films to attend Yale University. She made a successful transition to adult roles, winning two Academy Awards for Best Actress before the age of 30, and starring in several successful and acclaimed films such as The Accused (1988), The Silence of the Lambs (1991), Nell (1994), Maverick (1994), Contact (1997), and The Brave One (2007), thus establishing herself as one of the most accomplished and sought-after actresses of her generation. She has also ventured into directing and her directing credits include films such as Little Man Tate (1991), Money Monster (2016) and television shows such as House of Cards, Orange Is the New Black, and Black Mirror.

Now adults, Daniel Radcliffe, Rupert Grint and Emma Watson, the three leads of the acclaimed Harry Potter film series (2001–2011), starred in every installment in the series, and have since continued to act in film, television, and theater in their early 30s.

Dakota Fanning rose to prominence after her breakthrough performance at age 7 in the film I Am Sam (2001). Her performance earned her a Screen Actors Guild Award nomination at age 8 in 2002, making her the youngest nominee in SAG history. She later appeared in major Hollywood productions, in such acclaimed blockbuster films as Man on Fire (2004), War of the Worlds (2005), Charlotte's Web (2006), Hounddog (2007), The Secret Life of Bees (2008), Coraline (2009), The Twilight Saga film series (2009–2012), The Runaways (2010), and The Motel Life (2012). Fanning's younger sister, Elle Fanning, also rose to prominence as a child actress, having appeared in many films since before she turned 3.

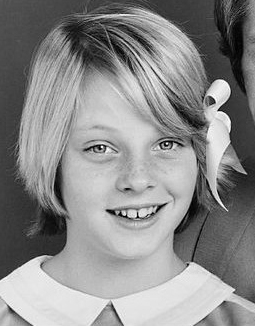
Jodie Foster rose to prominence as a child star in the 1970s.

Miranda Cosgrove, known mainly for her roles as Summer in the film School of Rock and Megan on the Nickelodeon sitcom Drake & Josh as a child, gained more attention for her role as a teenager in the show iCarly. Since the end of the show she has been featured in other roles, including as the voice of Margo in the Despicable Me franchise. Once she was of age, she decided to pursue a college degree in film at the University of Southern California.

Raven-Symoné achieved childhood stardom in her roles on The Cosby Show and Hangin' with Mr. Cooper but would achieve mainstream breakthrough with her role as Raven Baxter in the Disney Channel sitcom That's So Raven and as Galleria in The Cheetah Girls films. After both projects ended, Raven would star in Revenge of the Bridesmaids, the short-lived State of Georgia, and had a long running voiceover gig as Iridessa in the Tinker Bell series. After her run on Broadway's Sister Act in 2012, she briefly retired and enrolled at the Academy of Art University, earning her degree in fine arts. She later returned to the industry to become a co host on The View and returned to the Disney Channel for the spinoff Raven's Home.

Late actress Shirley Temple became a public figure and diplomat, beginning in the 1960s. Some of her duties included representing the United Nations, and becoming a U.S. ambassador in countries such as Ghana and Czechoslovakia.

Mary-Kate Olsen, who shared the role of Michelle Tanner with her twin sister Ashley on the ABC sitcom Full House, was treated for the eating disorder anorexia, but Ashley was less troubled. In an article in Marie Claire, Mary-Kate recalled the bittersweet nature of the twins' childhood. "I look at old photos of me, and I don't feel connected to them at all," she said. "I would never wish my upbringing on anyone... but I wouldn't take it back for the world." The twins eventually retired from acting to pursue a full-time career in the fashion industry, which, to this day, is continuously successful with an estimated net worth of approximately $100,000,000.

Drew Barrymore, a former child star, started acting at age 3. During her childhood she battled with drugs, but recovered and currently continues to act.

Natalie Portman took a small break in acting to get a bachelor's degree in psychology from Harvard University before continuing her career as an actress.

Rider Strong, known as the character "Shawn Hunter" in Boy Meets World, was educated at Columbia University, now writes a successful blog and has published a graphic novel.

Neil Patrick Harris started his career as a child actor in Doogie Howser, M.D.. He continues to act in television, films and theater. Harris is now a cult figure icon.

Jonathan Lipnicki, known mostly for the Stuart Little films, now successfully competes in Brazilian jiu-jitsu.

Sara Gilbert is known for her role on Roseanne and later created and served as a co-host for CBS's The Talk.

Also from Roseanne, Michael Fishman continued to work in film, but behind the scenes and has since been nominated for an Emmy for the work he did in Sports Science. Both Gilbert and Fishman returned for the continuation of Roseanne, The Conners, with Gilbert also serving as an executive producer. She guided the series through its transition after Roseanne Barr was fired after the tenth season of Roseanne.

Kirsten Dunst and Lacey Chabert both made the transition from a child actress to an adult actress with a rough patch including depression. After a stay in a rehabilitation center, Dunst was able to recover and continue her career. She proves that the pressures of growing up under the spotlight may not come without repercussions.

Other examples are Roddy McDowall, who had a long and outstanding career, including roles in the Planet of the Apes film and live-action TV series; Micky Dolenz, who started his career as a child star in the 1950s and who grew up to be a musician in the successful 1960s pop group The Monkees, which had its own successful television show; Ron Howard, who, in addition to being the star of both of the long running The Andy Griffith Show and Happy Days television series, became an Academy Award-winning director in adulthood; and Elijah Wood, who continued his career successfully into adulthood, starring as Frodo Baggins in The Lord of the Rings film series and starring as Ryan Newman in the television series Wilfred.

=== Other careers ===
Many actors' and child actors' careers are often quite short. Many actors, out of personal choice, that start their careers as child actors decide not to pursue the same careers as adults. Shirley Temple, for example, became a public figure and diplomat. Peter Ostrum, appearing in his only role, the lead character of Charlie Bucket in Willy Wonka and the Chocolate Factory, became a large-animal veterinary surgeon. Jenny Lewis, formerly of film Troop Beverly Hills in 1989, is a well-known singer-songwriter and indie rock musician. Renee Olstead, best known for her role in the sitcom Still Standing, became a jazz musician.

In Poland, former child actors and identical twin brothers Lech and Jarosław Kaczyński became successful politicians, at one time Lech being president and Jarosław the prime minister.

== See also ==
- Actor
- Acting age
- Lists of child actors
- Child labor
