= Mya-Lecia Naylor =

English actress (2002–2019)

- Born: Mya Lecia Naylor; 6 November 2002; Warwickshire, England
- Died: 7 April 2019 (aged 16); Thornton Heath, London, England
- Resting place: Our Lady of The Annunciation Catholic Church
- Education: Royal Russell School; Coloma Convent Girls' School
- Occupations: Actress; singer; model
- Years active: 2004–2019
- Television: Tati's Hotel (2011); Millie Inbetween (2014–2018); Almost Never (2019)

Mya Lecia Naylor (6 November 2002 – 7 April 2019) was an English actress, singer and model. With a career that spanned 15 years, she was best known for her roles as Tati in the CITV family series Tati's Hotel (2011), Fran in the CBBC children's sitcom series Millie Inbetween (2014–2018) and Mya in the CBBC musical dramedy Almost Never (2019).

== Early life ==
Mya Lecia Naylor was born in Warwickshire on 6 November 2002, as the eldest child of Martin Naylor and his wife, Zena (née Beggs). She resided in South Norwood in the London Borough of Croydon with her parents and two younger siblings.

Naylor was educated at Royal Russell School and Coloma Convent Girls' School.

== Career ==
Naylor made her television debut as an actress, at the age of two, in the Christmas special in the fifth series of the BBC One sitcom Absolutely Fabulous. The episode, "White Box", was broadcast on 25 December 2004.

Naylor portrayed Little Red Riding Hood in an episode of Cartoonito Tales in 2011.

Naylor portrayed Tati in the CITV family series Tati's Hotel in 2011. The series followed Tati, an eight-year-old who runs a magical hotel which gives a very special view of the world.

Naylor portrayed Bethany in the last two episodes of the three-part ITV psychological thriller series The Last Weekend in 2012.

Naylor made her film debut with the role of Miro in the epic science fiction film Cloud Atlas, written and directed by the Wachowskis and Tom Tykwer. The film is based on the 2004 novel by David Mitchell and has multiple plots occurring during six eras and featuring an ensemble cast who perform multiple roles across these time periods. The film was released in the United Kingdom on 26 October 2012.

Naylor portrayed Miriam in the 2013 film Code Red. She portrayed Moore's daughter in the 2014 film Index Zero.

Naylor portrayed Fran in the CBBC children's sitcom series Millie Inbetween from October 2014 to December 2018.

Naylor voiced Samantha in the BBC Radio 4 radio drama Drama on 4, in the episode "Mr Reasonable", broadcast in April 2015.

Naylor appeared on the 18th episode in the third series of the CBBC quiz show Top Class, which was broadcast in December 2017.

Naylor appeared on an episode of the CBBC live Saturday morning children's magazine entertainment programme Saturday Mash-Up!, with Zara Larsson. The episode was broadcast in January 2019.

Naylor portrayed Mya in the first series of the CBBC musical dramedy series Almost Never from January 2019 until her death.

Naylor was a member of the band Angels N' Bandits.

== Death ==
On 7 April 2019, Naylor was found hanging in a marquee at her home in Thornton Heath, South London by her mother, Zena, and was in cardiac arrest when emergency services were called to the address at 10:00 am. She was pronounced dead an hour and a half later at Croydon University Hospital. Naylor's father stated that his daughter "had not been her normal self" due to stress from her upcoming GCSEs and being grounded; he also added his belief that "she was just making some sort of point" and "did not mean to do it", calling it "a silly spur of the moment thing." Croydon Coroner's Court investigated the cause of her death and in September 2019, assistant coroner Toby Watkin believed Naylor did not intend to kill herself and ruled that the cause was death by misadventure. On 19 May 2019, a memorial service for Naylor was held at Our Lady of The Annunciation Catholic Church in Croydon.

== Filmography ==
Year	Title	Role	Notes
2004	Absolutely Fabulous	Jane	Episode: "White Box"
2011	Cartoonito Tales	Little Red Riding Hood	Episode: "Little Red Riding Hood"
2011	Tati's Hotel	Tati	Main role
2012	The Last Weekend	Bethany	2 episodes
2012	Cloud Atlas	Miro	
2013	Code Red	Miriam	
2014	Index Zero	Moore's daughter	
2014–2018	Millie Inbetween	Fran	Main role
2019	Saturday Mash-Up!	Herself	Episode: "Zara Larsson"
2019	Almost Never	Mya	Main role (season 1)
