= Millie Innes =

Scottish actress

- Born: 5 October 2000 (age 25); Cardonald, Glasgow, Scotland
- Education: Glasgow Academy of Musical Theatre Arts; Rosshall Academy
- Occupation: Actress
- Years active: 2010–present
- Known for: Dani's House; Millie Inbetween

Millie Innes (born 5 October 2000) is a Scottish actress, known for her roles as Maisy in Dani's House and Millie McDonald in Millie Inbetween.

== Early and personal life ==
Innes was born in 2000 to parents Julia and Campbell; she has a younger brother named Murray. Innes attended Rosshall Academy for her secondary education and was trained at the Glasgow Academy of Musical Theatre Arts. She studied English Literature at the University of Glasgow and now works behind the scenes of many TV shows and short films.

== Career ==
Innes' first role was in the four-part BBC drama Single Father, as Evie. Between 2011 and 2013, she appeared in Case Histories as Marlee Brodie, daughter of the protagonist. In 2011, Innes was chosen from 20,000 applicants for the role of Maisy in Dani's House, and she played Fiona in a 2013 episode of Dani's Castle. From 2014 to 2018, Innes portrayed the role of Millie McDonald in CBBC sitcom Millie Inbetween. In 2015, she appeared on Hacker Time and presented a Newsround documentary called Being Me.

== Filmography ==
Year	Title	Role	Notes	Ref(s)
2010	Single Father	Evie	Main role	
2011–2012	Dani's House	Maisy	20 episodes	
2011–2013	Case Histories	Marlee Brodie	8 episodes	
2013	Dani's Castle	Fiona	1 Episode	
2014–2018	Millie Inbetween	Millie McDonald	Main role	
2015	Newsround: Being Me	Herself	Documentary	
2015	Hacker Time	Herself	1 episode	
2016	Ultimate Brain	Herself	1 episode	
2017	Top Class	Herself	1 episode	

== Awards and nominations ==
Year	Award	Category	Work	Result	Ref(s)
2017	British Academy Children's Awards	Performer	Millie Inbetween	Nominated	
