= Tallulah Greive =

Scottish actress (born 1997)

- Born: Tallulah Greive; 23 October 1997 (age 29); Perth, Western Australia, Australia
- Occupation: Actress
- Years active: 2012–present

Tallulah Greive (born 23 October 1997) is an Australian-born Scottish actress. On television, she is known for her roles in the BBC series M.I. High (2013), Millie Inbetween (2014–2018), Flatmates (2019) and Boarders (2024–), and the Amazon Prime series My Lady Jane (2024). Her films include Our Ladies (2020) and Cinderella (2021).

== Early life and education ==
Greive was born in Perth, Western Australia in 1997 to parents Elizabeth "Becc" Sanderson, a jazz singer and performer, and Chris Greive, a jazz trombonist, composer and university lecturer. Greive and her parents moved to the United Kingdom when she was two years old and she was raised in Leith, Edinburgh. She has a younger sister, Lola.

== Career ==
Greive's acting career started on stage in 2012, where she played Genie in 1001 Nights at Widow Twankey's B&B. In 2013, she appeared in a further three plays, which were Emily and the Howler's Hollow as Euphemia, Love Bites as Cupid and Let Sleeping Beauties Lie as Flora. The next play she appeared in was Trash Palace as Celeste in 2014. Greive's first television role was in 2012 playing a daughter in an advert for the Royal Bank of Scotland. She played Melissa Albright in series 6 of M.I. High. In 2014, she appeared in an infomercial for the SNP. From 2014 to 2018, she portrayed the role of Lauren in CBBC's Millie Inbetween. In 2021, she played Princess Gwen in Amazon Studios' Cinderella.

== Filmography ==
Year	Title	Role	Notes
2013	M.I. High	Melissa Albright	Main role (season 6)
2014–2018	Millie Inbetween	Lauren McDonald	Main role
2019	Flatmates	Lauren McDonald	Main role (season 1)
2020	Penance	Maddie Douglas	Main role
2020	Our Ladies	Orla	Film
2021	Cinderella	Princess Gwen	Film
2021	Locked Down	Lily	Film
2024–present	Boarders	Beatrix	Main role
2024	My Lady Jane	Petunia	Recurring role

== Theatre ==
Year	Title	Role	Company	Director	Notes
2012	1001 Nights at Widow Twankey's B&B	Genie			
2013	Emily and the Howlers' Hollow	Euphemia			
2013	Love Bites	Cupid			
2013	Let Sleeping Beauties Lie	Flora			
2014	Trash Palace	Celeste			
2025	The Seagull	Masha	Lyceum Theatre, Edinburgh	James Brining	Mike Poulton's adaptation of the play by Anton Chekhov
2026	The Prime of Miss Jean Brodie	Monica Douglas	National Theatre of Scotland	Vicky Featherstone	David Harrower's adaptation of the novel by Muriel Spark
