= Abel Starkey =

American criminal (died 1827)

- Born: Roxbury, Massachusetts
- Died: September 28, 1827; Old Newgate Prison
- Occupation: Counterfeiter

Abel Starkey (died September 28, 1827) was a convicted counterfeiter whose death is closely tied to Old Newgate Prison after fatally falling during an escape attempt the night before the close of the prison. Starkey was from Roxbury, Massachusetts and became a counterfeiter. Members of a counterfeiting ring had eluded authorities for years, but they finally discovered the secret third attic of a lightning splitter home. Starkey was arrested, tried and convicted of counterfeiting. He was sentenced to a term of twenty years in the prison, where he would amass a sum of money. His attempt to escape ended in his death, accounts of Starkey's attempt continued to be popular in reference to the prison's history.

== Life ==
Abel Starkey was a native of Roxbury, Massachusetts. The story of Starkey's capture was published by George Hubbard in The New England Magazine. Starkey was part of a gang of counterfeiters, including Stephen Burroughs, Samuel Corson and James Smith. Pursued by the authorities, Abel Starkey disappeared in the vicinity of a lightning splitter home that was owned by the Shephardson family. A thorough search of the house was conducted and the authorities found nothing. According to Hubbard, the house was the refuge of the counterfeiters for a number of years. After a time the public and authorities continued to track members of the gang to the location and investigations were performed only to turn up empty. Sheriff Johnson of Worcester tracked the counterfeiters to the house one day and set up a team of men outside and inside the house to uncover and arrest the counterfeiters. A careful search turned up nothing, so measurements of the house were taken to make sure no secret rooms or areas existed. With the inaccessible third attic all but ruled out, the discovery of its access through the chimney was by chance when an officer emptied out his trash into the fireplace. Contained in the trash was some snuff and a sneeze came from above, alerting the officers of hidden occupants in the chimney. After the fire had been extinguished and raked out, Sheriff Johnson attempted to climb up into the chimney. A brick was dropped from above and wounded him. The authorities capped the chimney and smoked the counterfeiters until they fell unconscious. Starkey was amongst the three arrested counterfeiters.

Starkey was tried and convicted of counterfeiting and sentenced to a term of twenty years at Newgate Prison. In prison, Starkey was able to save up and set aside a good amount of money, but his good behavior helped him earn the favor and even friendship of prison officials. The construction of Wethersfield State Prison would lead to the closure and transportation of the inmates and Starkey reportedly made declarations that he'd never go to the new prison. On September 28, 1827, the day prior to the transfer, Starkey requested that he have his final stay in the underground shaft and his request was granted. For reasons unknown, the well hatch was left open and Starkey was able to make an escape attempt by climbing up the well rope. The rope broke and Starkey fell down the shaft and fell to his death. According to Newgate of Connecticut, Starkey would amass a total of $100 in prison, equivalent to $2,846 in 2025. When his body was discovered, it was found that he had $50 in possession and it was believed that a bribe had been paid to leave the hatch open. More modern accounts state that he drowned, whereas earlier sources state that his skull had been crushed. According to Richard Harvey Phelps's Newgate of Connecticut, Starkey's feet were found tied together, likely to aid in ascending the rope.

== In popular culture ==
The connection of Starkey's fatal fall is deeply tied to the closure of Newgate and his death has sparked numerous variations and accounts. In 1967, W. Storrs Lee's published article in American Hertige that has been often cited by later accounts of the prison's history. Contained within is the assertion that Starkey bribed a guard and that the guard left the rope and the bucket for Starkey to climb which is also at odds with reporting from Phelps' 1844 publication and Hubbard's 1907 description of Starkey's capture and fatal escape. In 2007, The Boston Globe even when so far as to state that Starkey was found "still clutching the bag of coins he intended to use to pay off the guard." Many accounts assert that Starkey bribed a guard $50 to leave the bucket and rope hanging to facilitate the escape, whereas others follower earlier accounts that the well hatch was left unlocked.

Suzy Kline's book, Horrible Harry Moves up to the Third Grade features a story on Starkey's deadly escape. The account is given to the characters by a guide, stating Starkey's amassing of the $100 and bribery of a guard. The fictional guide also states that the guard provided the information on the way to escape, and deliberately chose not to warn Starkey of the frayed rope that would cause his fatal fall.
