= Emma Tate =

British actress

- Occupation: Actress
- Years active: 1991–present

Emma Tate is a British voice actress who has worked in various animated films, television shows and video games.

== Career ==
Tate debuted in a 1991 episode of The Bill and from 1999, she commenced work in voice acting, mainly in children's programmes, starting with the U.S. version of Bob the Builder and also on Dream Street, voicing Half-Pint the milk float. In 2006, Emma began to voice Perfect Peter in the TV adaptation of Francesca Simon's book Horrid Henry.

In 2010, she began to appear with Horrid Henry co-star Joanna Ruiz in Everything's Rosie, voicing the main characters. Ruiz voices the title character while Tate voices Raggles the rabbit. In the 2013 video game Broken Sword 5: The Serpent's Curse, she voices the female lead Nicole Collard and other minor roles. She also provided voices for the Warcraft expansion Battle for Azeroth in 2018.

== Filmography ==
=== Film ===
Year	Title	Role	Notes
2005	Valiant	Additional voice	
2005	Corpse Bride	Stella (voice)	
2006	Flushed Away	Fly-Lady, Passerby #2	
2009	Planet 51	Additional voice	
2009	Professor Layton & The Eternal Diva	Emmy Altava & Janice Quatlane & Melina Whistler	
2012	Gladiators of Rome	Circe (voice)	
2013	Moshi Monsters: The Movie	Katsuma (voice)	
2013	Moshi Monsters: The Movie	Luvli (voice)	
2015	Shaun the Sheep Movie	Hazel (voice)	
2018	Monster Family	Head Model (voice)	
2019	Hellboy	Baba Yaga (voice)	
2019	A Shaun the Sheep Movie: Farmageddon	Hazel (voice)	
2026	Pinocchio Unstrung	Wood Mother (voice)	
2026	Shaun the Sheep: The Beast of Mossy Bottom	Hazel (voice)	

=== Television ===
Year	Title	Role	Notes
1999–2012	Bob the Builder	Benny, Marjorie, Saffron, Cassia Sabatini	British/American dub
1999–2012	Bob the Builder	Lofty, Dizzy, Sumsy, Ella	American dub
1999–2002	Dream Street	Half-Pint	
2000–01	The Magic Key	Kipper	British dub
2003–06	The Paz Show	Rabbit	British/American dub
2004–10	The Backyardigans	Tyrone, Tasha (season 3–4)	British dub
2005	New Captain Scarlet	Destiny Angel	
2005–07	Pitt & Kantrop	Deena	
2005–08	Planet Sketch		
2005–08	Harry and His Bucket Full of Dinosaurs	Harry, Harry's mother	British/Australian dub
2006–08	Louie	Louie	British/Australian dub
2006–08	The Magic Roundabout	Ermintrude, Coral	
2006–19	Horrid Henry	Perfect Peter, Spotless Sam, Lazy Linda, Miss Oddbod, Madame Tutu, Additional Voices	
2007–08	Finley the Fire Engine	Jesse, Isabelle, Scooty	British dub
2009–10	Mr. Baby	Carole	English dub
2009	The Mr. Men Show	Little Miss Helpful, Little Miss Magic, Little Miss Sunshine (season 2)	British dub
2010–17	Everything's Rosie	Raggles, Bluebird	
2010–14	Chloe's Closet	Additional voices	
2010–14	The Jungle Book	Mowgli	
2012–16	Peter Rabbit	Flopsy, Mopsy, Cottontail	British dub
2012–13	Teenage Fairytale Dropouts	Fairy Godmother, Mother Goose, Melody	Mexican-Australian animated series
2014–19	Pip Ahoy!	Alba, Mrs. Twitcher, Billy Badger, Amir, Madame Eclair, Mrs. Finn, Trelawney	
2014–15	Toot the Tiny Tugboat	Paula the Trawler, Marge the Barge, Neela, The Posh Yachts, Sasha the Submarine	
2015–present	Shaun the Sheep	Hazel	
2015	Shaun the Sheep: The Farmer's Llamas	Hazel (voice)	Television film
2015–18	Sydney Sailboat	Stormy	
2015–20	Thunderbirds Are Go	Emily Sullivan	Episode: "City Under the Sea"
2016	Kazoops!	Gran	
2017–present	Numberblocks	12, 19, 21/Captain Hexbeard, 27, 32, 33, 45, 49	
2021	Shaun the Sheep: The Flight Before Christmas	Hazel	Television film
2022	His Dark Materials	Harpies (voices)	2 episodes

=== Video games ===
Year	Title	Role	Notes
2005	Wallace & Gromit: The Curse of the Were-Rabbit	Miss Thrip	
2005	Kameo: Elements of Power	Kameo	
2006	Rule of Rose	Susan, Olivia, Martha	
2008	Dragon Quest Swords: The Masked Queen and the Tower of Mirrors	Envoy of Xiphos	
2009	Wallace & Gromit's Grand Adventures	Winnie Gabberley	
2011	Harry Potter and the Deathly Hallows – Part 2	Molly Weasley	
2015	Bloodborne	Hunter (Female)	
2020	Xenoblade Chronicles: Definitive Edition	Kino	
2023	Total War: Warhammer III	N'Kari, Additional Voices	

=== Other ===
Year	Title	Role	Notes
1994	Knots in the Wood	Cherry	Pilot episode
