= Horrid Henry Tricks the Tooth Fairy =

Book by Francesca Simon

Horrid Henry: Tricking the Tooth Fairy Horrid Henry Tricks The Tooth Fairy
- First edition with the book's original title
- Author: Francesca Simon
- Original title: Horrid Henry and the Tooth Fairy
- Illustrator: Tony Ross
- Cover artist: Tony Ross
- Language: English
- Series: Horrid Henry
- Genre: Children's fiction
- Publisher: Orion
- Publication date: 1996
- Publication place: Great Britain
- Media type: Print (hardback)
- ISBN: 978-1-85881-371-4
- Preceded by: Horrid Henry and the Secret Club
- Followed by: Horrid Henry's Nits

First edition to use the best known title

First edition to use the current title

Horrid Henry: Tricking the Tooth Fairy, published from 2000 to 2019 as Horrid Henry Tricks The Tooth Fairy and also published as Horrid Henry and the Tooth Fairy, is the third book of the Horrid Henry series. It was first published in 1996 as Horrid Henry and the Tooth Fairy. It was written by Francesca Simon and illustrated by Tony Ross.

== Plot ==
=== Horrid Henry Tricks The Tooth Fairy ===
Everyone in Horrid Henry's class has lost at least one tooth, except Henry himself. Just today, his younger brother, Perfect Peter, has lost a tooth. Henry decides to eat as many sweets as he can from his sweet jar, despite it being a few days before "Sweet Day", when he is allowed to eat sweets. Henry's attempt proves fruitless when none of his teeth feel wobbly, and worse, his mouth, gums and stomach hurt. Desperate, Henry decides to trick the tooth fairy. Henry silently creeps into Peter's room during the night and steals the tooth Peter placed under his pillow. Henry is nearly caught by his mother, but manages to escape. The next morning, Henry doesn't find a pound coin from the tooth fairy, but Peter does instead. Henry learns from his mother that the tooth fairy checks the gap between the child's teeth. Henry realizes his mistake and places a piece of black paper over his mouth. At night, when he sleeps, he ties his finger to a fake vampire tooth (a substitute for the real one) to make sure that when the tooth fairy comes and takes his tooth, he gets woken up. The next morning, Henry receives a fake 50p coin and a letter from the tooth fairy, mocking him for his trick. Henry's mother calls him down and scolds him for eating all the sweets and tells him to eat apples instead. Henry takes an apple and bites on it. He eventually realises that the bite caused one of his teeth to fall out, and, to his horror, he also swallowed it.

=== Horrid Henry's Wedding ===
Horrid Henry's cousin, Prissy Polly, is set to marry Pimply Paul. Henry has been chosen to be a pageboy, along with Perfect Peter, his brother. A series of problems, such as Henry's pageboy clothes being too "tight", him refusing to go at all, and being caught in a thunderstorm cause the family to arrive late for the wedding. While the priest says all the holy blessings and promises, Henry pretends to be a chef tossing pancakes, only with the wedding rings instead. When the rings are needed (which Henry accidentally loses), Henry gives them a toy pirate ring. Afterwards, when everyone takes wedding photos, Henry jumps in at the last moment and makes rude faces. A while later, during the reception, while everyone is eating their lunch, Henry secretly eats the wedding cake but Pimply Paul catches him. While Paul is chasing Henry, he leaps and lands into the cake. Henry's entire family is surprised that there was no wedding cake.

=== Moody Margaret Moves In ===
Moody Margaret moves into Henry's house for two weeks while her parents go on holiday. His room is given to Margaret, leaving him to sleep in Perfect Peter's room. When Margaret arrives, she immediately orders everyone to do spring cleaning. After that, Margaret consistently gets Henry into trouble during dinner. At bedtime, Margaret booby traps Henry's bed and stresses his parents by complaining. In the morning, Margaret wakes everyone up with her trumpet and forces Mum to make breakfast for her. Additionally, Margaret finds and eats Henry's secret biscuits and crisps, and bans everyone from playing tapes, singing and even breathing just because it annoys her. Finally having had enough, Henry devises a plan to get rid of her. He calls Margaret's parents to come home at once from their holiday, claiming that Margaret is in an emergency. The plan works and Margaret is eventually sent home, but Peter reveals to Mum and Dad what Henry did, having heard him over the telephone. Rather than punish Henry for his actions, however, Mum just simply sends him to his room. Henry believes that sweeter words are never spoken.

=== Horrid Henry's New Teacher ===
Horrid Henry is a teacher's worst nightmare, but not for Ninius Nerdon. When he is Henry's teacher, he demonstrates his resilience perfectly. He backfires Henry's tricks on him and answers back to any statement that Henry gives. He never demonstrates irateness towards Henry and even twists Henry's rude jokes into a nightmare for him. But when Henry tricks him into believing that Peter has fallen to his death out of an upstairs window, Mr. Nerdon faints and gets taken away in an ambulance. Henry, however, is unfazed that the even more notorious teacher Miss Battle-Axe will be teaching his class from then on.

== Publication ==
- The book was first published in hardback in 1996.
- It was published in paperback in 1997.
- The current edition was published in 2000.
- "Horrid Henry's New Teacher" was reprinted in "Horrid Henry's Big Bad Book".
- "Horrid Henry Tricks the Tooth Fairy" was reprinted in "Horrid Henry's Wicked Ways.
- "Moody Margaret Moves In" was reprinted in "Horrid Henry's Evil Enemies'.
- "Horrid Henry's Wedding" was reprinted in "Horrid Henry's Dreadful Deeds".
- The entire book, along with every other Horrid Henry book, was reprinted in Horrid Henry's A-Z of Everything Horrid.
- The entire book was reprinted in paperback with an audio CD with it, with the same title.
- Horrid Henry Tricks the Tooth Fairy and Horrid Henry's Wedding were reprinted in the Early Readers series, aimed at younger children, with colour illustrations in 2013 and 2014, respectively.

== In other media ==
- All the stories were adapted into animated episodes in the Horrid Henry TV series and were respectively adapted by Paul Alexander, Holly Lyons and John Brennan.
