= Everything's Rosie (TV series) =

- Genre: Children's animated series
- Developed by: Vickie Corner
- Written by: Chris Parker; Dave Ingham; James Mason; Gillian Corderoy; Rachel Dawson; Andrew Viner; Lisa Akhurst
- Directed by: John Offord (2010–2012); Jean Flynn (2010–2012); Mark Woollard (2012–2015)
- Starring: Wayne Forester; Emma Tate; Joanna Ruiz; Teresa Gallagher; Harriet Moran
- Composer: Mike Moran
- Country of origin: United Kingdom
- Original language: English
- No. of series: 4
- No. of episodes: 105 (list of episodes)

Production
- Executive producer: Vickie Corner
- Running time: 11 minutes 24 minutes ("When You Wish Upon an Oak")
- Production companies: V&S Entertainment Ltd.

Original release
- Network: CBeebies
- Release: 3 May 2010 – 14 February 2017

Everything's Rosie is a British animated children's TV series. The series was developed by Vickie Corner for V&S Entertainment Ltd. for CBeebies and Baraem (Series 1-2) and produced in HD CGI animation. The series follows the adventures of a little girl named Rosie and her friends. Four series have been aired along with a special episode "When You Wish Upon an Oak". Everything's Rosie is broadcast on CBeebies in the UK and internationally across 160 territories. The show also aired on the CBeebies on BBC Two block, and the BBC HD channel.

== Plot ==
The original logo from 2010 to 2017.

Rosie, the protagonist, is a 6-year-old ragdoll-like child who has educational adventures. She and her friends including a young girl, a blue rabbit, a bear, trees, and a bird teach viewers simple lessons as they play and learn while also getting into various adventures in a colourful 3-D animated world.

== Episodes ==
Season	Episodes	Originally released	
Season	Episodes	First released	Last released
1	26	May 3, 2010	June 28, 2010
2	26	May 23, 2011	July 18, 2011
3	26	June 18, 2012	March 30, 2013
4	26	March 2, 2015	February 14, 2017

== Characters ==
=== Main ===
The 7 main characters. Rosie, Raggles, Holly, Will, Big Bear, Oakley and Bluebird.

- Rosie is the lead character, a 6-year-old girl with ribbons for hair as well as a button at the top of her head. She is voiced by Harriet Moran in seasons 1–3 and Joanna Ruiz in Season 4.
- Raggles is a blue rabbit who is Rosie's best friend. Raggles has a zipper on his tummy where he likes to keep his favourite things. He is voiced by Emma Tate.
- Holly is a sweet, polite young girl who has blonde hair tied in pigtails and a pink dress as well as a purple bow with small yellow polka dots. She is voiced by Teresa Gallagher.
- Will is a condescending, bratty, obnoxious boy who has ginger hair, a red shirt & a pair of jeans; he likes riding his Go Speeder and playing with his football. Will is very whiny, but nobody has the heart to discipline him. He is voiced by Teresa Gallagher.
- Big Bear is a large teddy bear who loves to cook, build & explore with the other friends. He is voiced by Wayne Forester.
- Bluebird is a petulant and egotistical bird who believes she has magical powers and has large vocabulary. When she, Teal & Manny are together, they usually act like dramatic and/or sulky toddlers. She is voiced by Emma Tate.
- Oakley is an ancient old oak tree who sits on a hill near Rosie's house. Oakley is where Bluebird's nest is usually seen, and where the Little Acorns live. He is voiced by Wayne Forester.

=== Other ===
- Archie is a cute, friendly talking chameleon who can become invisible instead of changing colour. Archie's common catchphrase is "Ay, caramba(a catchphrase also said by Bart Simpson from the Simpsons) and he is capable of speaking Spanish.
- Little Acorns are a high-pitched giggling trio of acorns who live on one of Oakley's branches, and like to bounce on Raggles' head.
- Little Bear is Big Bear's nephew who occasionally comes to visit his uncle.
- Saffie is a Cedar of Lebanon and sits in a dip beside The Studio, and makes quotes throughout episodes.
- Teal is a duck with a scouse accent. She likes to point out things that are involved in her sentence.
- Manny is a cheeky, mischievous and stubborn bird. He has a croaky voice.
- The Mordys are a family of dormice. They have one son and one daughter.
- The Dartys are well spoken geckos with high standards and an aloof air. They like to shrug most of the time, but only when confused.
- Mat and Nat are two beavers who have set up home at the Beaver Dam near the waterfall.
- Monty is a cheeky monkey who lives in the branches of the Grand Old Oak in the middle of the magical forest. He wears blue dungarees.
- Grand Old Oak is the oldest oak tree who is surrounded by a ring of cool water in the middle of a forest.
- Auntie Bear is either Big Bear's or Little Bear's auntie, she is unseen but mentioned in "Big Bear In A Spin".
- Grandfather Bear is Big Bear's grandfather. Like Auntie Bear, he is unseen but mentioned in "Across The Universe".

== Locations ==
- The Playhouse is a large pink dome with a helter skelter-esque slide surrounding it. It is where Rosie & Raggles live and is the largest house in Rosie's world.
- Oakley's Hill is the highest hill in Rosie's world, and judging by its name, the hill is where Oakley was planted.
- Big Bear's Den is a big house with ivy growing along the interior walls. Big Bear has his own bed and has the largest garden in Rosie's world.
- The Playground is a large area in Rosie's world. There is a big roundabout, a seesaw, orange and yellow swings, a fountain and a sandpit.
- The Picnic Area is an area in Rosie's world. There are seats and a table, which are all sculpted from trees. The Picnic Area merges into the forest surrounding Rosie's world.
- The Maze is an area in Rosie's world. The maze's walls are made from hedges, and there is a flagpole in the centre, with surrounding buttons that raise the characters' flags.
- The Orchard is a large orchard in front of the playhouse. There are bozberry bushes, apple trees and plum trees, which the characters use to make food.
- The Podswings are near the playhouse and is held up with bamboo, which holds the pod-like seats which the characters like to swing and spin in.
- The Stream is a narrow stream that flows through Rosie's world. Matt and Nat the Beavers and Teal are often seen near the stream with their dams and nest.
- The Showground is located behind Oakley's hill. It is a large blue pitch made of rings and circles, and can turn into different structures, including skating rinks and tennis courts.
- The Studio is a blue semi-detached house implanted in the ground. One half is where Will upgrades his Go-Speeder and invents strange things, and the other half is where Holly keeps all her art equipment.

== Development ==
Everything's Rosie was created by Vickie Corner for V&S Entertainment Ltd and co-produced with JCC, owned by The Qatar Foundation. The series was one of the first international co-productions to air on Baraem TV, which is available throughout the Arabic countries and Europe in the Arabic language.

In development for nearly 10 years since 2001 or 2002 before going into production, the concept was to create a visually appealing girl-led show that would additionally appeal to boys.

== Release ==
On 3 May 2010, the first episode of Everything's Rosie aired on CBeebies. Series 1 introduced the primary characters within Rosie's World and established the relationships between the friends. Production on Series 2 was completed in 2011, with the first episode airing on 23 May. Series 2 introduced a range of new secondary characters and additional locations. The first episode of Series 3 aired on 18 June 2012. A 24-minute feature-length special, "When You Wish Upon an Oak", was commissioned by CBeebies in 2013 and premiered on New Year's Day 2014. The first episode of Series 4 aired on 2 March 2015, with the season completing production at the end of 2015, bringing the total number of episodes to 105.

Everything's Rosie has been sold in over 160 territories worldwide and dubbed into 27 different languages.

== Merchandising ==
The first line of Everything's Rosie toys was released in 2011. Books were published by Egmont, and DVDs were launched in conjunction with Universal Studios Home Entertainment in 2012.

The Everything's Rosie Website is advertising a new line of Everything's Rosie toys. Currently, Rosie herself, Raggles, Big Bear & Holly are advertised.

== Foreign adaptations ==
Everything's Rosie has been produced in 27 languages worldwide. In August 2022, the Serbian Everything's Rosie website was launched.
