= List of Horrid Henry episodes =

The following is a list of Horrid Henry episodes.

== Series overview ==
Series	Episodes	Originally released	
Series	Episodes	First released	Last released
1	52	30 October 2006	9 October 2007
2	52	16 February 2009	23 December 2012
3	52	22 July 2011	1 September 2012
4	52	11 October 2014	25 October 2015
5	42	17 November 2018	21 May 2019
Specials	2	21 October 2019	17 September 2020

== Episodes ==
=== Series 1 (2006–2007) ===
No. overall	No. in series	Title	Directed by	Written by	Original release date	Prod. code
1	1	"Horrid Henry Tricks and Treats"	Dave Unwin	John Brennan	30 October 2006	106
Can Henry do his tricks and get his treats on Halloween when he is banned from going trick or treating and is sent to his room after he shaves Peter's hair off?
2	2	"Horrid Henry's Hobby"	Dave Unwin	Malcolm Williamson	31 October 2006	103
Henry is desperate to get a Golden Gizmo from the cereal through every means possible.
3	3	"Horrid Henry and the Bogey Babysitter"	Dave Unwin	Joe Williams	1 November 2006	110
Mum and Dad go out to dinner, leaving Henry and Peter with Rabid Rebecca, the toughest babysitter in town.
4	4	"Horrid Henry's Hike"	Dave Unwin	Malcolm Williamson	2 November 2006	101
Henry is forced to go on a countryside hike with his family when he'd much rather be watching Rapper Zapper on TV.
5	5	"Moody Margaret Moves In"	Dave Unwin	Holly Lyons	3 November 2006	102
Henry's weekend gets in grave danger when Moody Margaret stays at his house while her parents go on holiday.
6	6	"Horrid Henry's Sports Day"	Dave Unwin	Rebecca Stevens	10 November 2006	105
Henry sabotages the races on his school sports day while trying to get sent home again.
7	7	"Horrid Henry's School Fair"	Dave Unwin	John Brennan	17 November 2006	104
Henry wants to win a Double Drencher at the school fair.
8	8	"Horrid Henry and the Demon Dinner Lady"	Dave Unwin	John Brennan	24 November 2006	108
The new dinner lady is stealing treats from everyone's lunchboxes and Henry must stop her from ruining his lunch.
9	9	"Horrid Henry Eats Out"	Dave Unwin	Katherine Sandford	1 December 2006	114
Henry's family dines at a fancy restaurant with Rich Aunt Ruby and Stuck-Up Steve.
10	10	"Horrid Henry: Who Stole Mr Kill?"	Dave Unwin	Dave Ingham	8 December 2006	111
Henry becomes a detective to see who took his favourite teddy bear, Mr Kill.
11	11	"Horrid Henry Goes Swimming"	Dave Unwin	Paul Alexander	15 December 2006	112
Henry hates swimming lessons and is one of the few students who hasn't gotten his 5-metre badge.
12	12	"Horrid Henry and the Time Machine"	Dave Unwin	Malcolm Williamson	18 December 2006	116
Henry tricks Peter into thinking he's traveled to the future.
13	13	"Horrid Henry's Christmas"	Dave Unwin	Joe Williams	21 December 2006	109
It's Christmas Eve and Henry is desperate to get a Boom Boom Basher but does not want his cousin, Stuck-Up Steve, to get one too.
14	14	"Horrid Henry's Birthday"	Dave Unwin	Malcolm Williamson	8 January 2007	115
Henry hopes his latest Birthday Party will be his best one yet.
15	15	"Horrid Henry and the Tooth Fairy"	Dave Unwin	Paul Alexander	9 January 2007	107
Henry is desperate to get a pound coin from the tooth fairy. Everyone else has a loose tooth except Henry.
16	16	"Horrid Henry Goes to Work"	Dave Unwin	Carol Noble	10 January 2007	113
Henry's idea of what a job is like isn't right to him. Bossy Bill, the son of Henry's dad's boss, Bossy Bob, keeps getting him in trouble.
17	17	"Horrid Henry and the Dinner Guests"	Dave Unwin	Olly Smith	12 February 2007	117
Henry attempts to find a way to wiggle into a dinner party with guests Mr and Mrs. Mossy.
18	18	"Horrid Henry's Horrid Revenge"	Dave Unwin	Chris Trengrove	13 February 2007	120
Henry accidentally paints Peter blue, is sent to his room, and plots revenge.
19	19	"Horrid Henry and the Secret Club"	Dave Unwin	John Brennan	14 February 2007	130
Henry and Margaret have a competition to see whose club is better - The Purple Hand Gang or The Secret Club.
20	20	"Horrid Henry's Perfect Day"	Dave Unwin	Alan MacDonald	15 February 2007	127
After not being allowed to go to the funfair for a bad report card at school, Henry decides to be perfect like Peter for a day.
21	21	"Perfect Peter's Horrid Day"	Dave Unwin	Allan Plenderleith	16 February 2007	121
Peter is tired of being unnoticed for his good deeds, so he decides to be horrid like Henry for a day.
22	22	"Horrid Henry Tidies Up"	Dave Unwin	Dave Ingham	19 February 2007	152
Henry and Peter are competing against each other for having tidy bedrooms in an attempt to go to their favourite restaurants for a Saturday night dinner.
23	23	"Horrid Henry Gets Rich Quick"	Dave Unwin	Malcolm Williamson	20 February 2007	119
To raise money for new toys, Henry decides to sell his parents' belongings to his friends, and sells Peter to Margaret as a 'slave'.
24	24	"Horrid Henry and the Football Fiend"	Dave Unwin	Chris Trengrove	21 February 2007	125
Henry's class are desperate to watch the football game live, but the only way to do so is to be the Player of the Match in a football game.
25	25	"Horrid Henry's Time Capsule"	Dave Unwin	Malcolm Williamson	22 February 2007	132
Henry puts Peter's favourite rabbit toy, Bunny, in the school's time capsule after not being allowed to put his slime in. Henry's now on a mission to retrieve Bunny or his pocket money is history...
26	26	"Horrid Henry Runs Away"	Dave Unwin	Olly Smith	23 February 2007	134
After getting his pocket money taken away, Henry plans to run away from home.
27	27	"Horrid Henry's Horrid Heroes"	Dave Unwin	Dave Ingham	2 April 2007	128
Henry, Ralph and Peter form a band for their school talent show in order for Henry to win tickets to a concert.
28	28	"Horrid Henry's Haunted House"	Dave Unwin	Joe Williams	3 April 2007	138
Stuck-Up Steve tricks Henry into thinking the attic in his mansion is haunted.
29	29	"Horrid Henry and the Injection"	Dave Unwin	Joe Williams	4 April 2007	131
Henry must face his worst fear - Injection day!
30	30	"Horrid Henry's Hideo Video"	Dave Unwin	Dave Ingham	5 April 2007	135
Henry is after some money, so he aims to make some accidents on his family, but Moody Margaret gets the better of him.
31	31	"Horrid Henry's Underpants"	Dave Unwin	Alan MacDonald	6 April 2007	139
Henry is worried that his friends Rude Ralph, Aerobic Al and Beefy Bert will see him wear pink underpants.
32	32	"Horrid Henry, Computer Whizz"	Dave Unwin	Allan Plenderleith	9 April 2007	141
Henry cheats on a computer test, and now everyone wants his computer knowledge.
33	33	"Horrid Henry Makes Some Money"	Dave Unwin	Alan MacDonald	9 April 2007	143
Henry invents a creature called a "Fangmangler" - a thing made out of his hamster, Fang.
34	34	"Horrid Henry and the New Teacher"	Dave Unwin	John Brennan/ Lucinda Whiteley	10 April 2007	136
Miss Battle-Axe is sick with the flu, and so a very strict substitute teacher is sent to teach her class.
35	35	"Horrid Henry Meets the Queen"	Dave Unwin	John Brennan	11 April 2007	140
Henry wants to ask the Queen his lifetime question, but Peter has personally been chosen to meet her. Much hilarity ensues with only a slight hint of anti-royalism until Herny ruins the day for his family.
36	36	"Horrid Henry's New Shoes"	Dave Unwin	Chris Trengrove	12 April 2007	137
Henry is desperate to get new shoes, but not the kind his Mum is wanting to get.
37	37	"Horrid Henry's Household Chores"	Dave Unwin	Alan MacDonald	24 September 2007	146
It's the weekend and Henry is forced to do all of his chores instead of watching TV.
38	38	"Horrid Henry: Where's Fluffy?"	Dave Unwin	Dave Ingham	25 September 2007	148
Peter is distraught when Fluffy the cat runs away. Henry is the main suspect and it's up to him to find him or there'll be big trouble!
39	39	"Horrid Henry's Fairy Dance"	Dave Unwin	Amanda Swift	26 September 2007	149
Henry must stop Peter's endless obsession with fairies.
40	40	"Horrid Henry's Horrid Hamster"	Dave Unwin	Dave Ingham	27 September 2007	144
Henry takes his hamster, Fang, for show and tell, but chaos ensues.
41	41	"Horrid Henry: Happy Birthday Peter!"	Dave Unwin	Allan Plenderleith	28 September 2007	129
At Perfect Peter's Birthday Party, Henry and Ralph want the event to be over to have Peter's birthday cake.
42	42	"Horrid Henry's Diary"	Dave Unwin	Dave Ingham	29 September 2007	150
Henry must keep a diary of his day for homework until Fluffy ruins it.
43	43	"Perfect Peter's Revenge"	Dave Unwin	Paul Alexander	30 September 2007	133
Peter has had enough of Henry, so he plots his revenge on him by sending Moody Margaret a love letter until he ends up in detention.
44	44	"Horrid Henry's Holiday"	Dave Unwin	Alan MacDonald	1 October 2007	126
Henry wants to go to Camp le Fun in France, but his family goes real camping instead.
45	45	"Horrid Henry Trapped!"	Dave Unwin	Paul Alexander	2 October 2007	123
Henry and Peter are locked inside the basement, and Mum can't hear them.
46	46	"Horrid Henry Reads a Book"	Dave Unwin	Jon Groves	3 October 2007	151
Henry cheats his way through a book-reading contest to win a prize, but it isn't what he hoped for.
47	47	"Horrid Henry's Sleepover"	Dave Unwin	Katherine Sandford	4 October 2007	124
New Nick invites Henry over for a sleepover.
48	48	"Horrid Henry's Sick Day"	Dave Unwin	Kelly Marshall	5 October 2007	122
Henry discovers that being sick for a day isn't all that fun.
49	49	"Horrid Henry's School Trip"	Dave Unwin	Kelly Marshall	6 October 2007	118
After a trip to the ice cream factory is cancelled, Henry and his class go to the town museum.
50	50	"Horrid Henry: Aquarium"	Dave Unwin	Toby Rushton	7 October 2007	145
Margaret tags along with Henry, Peter and Dad on a trip to the aquarium.
51	51	"Horrid Henry's Wedding"	Dave Unwin	Paul Alexander	8 October 2007	142
Henry is forced to be a pageboy at his cousin, Polly's wedding. However, he soon causes the wedding to turn into an unanticipated disaster.
52	52	"Horrid Henry's Dance Class"	Dave Unwin	James Henry	9 October 2007	147
Henry is stuck in Madame Tutu's ballet class when he'd rather go to Karate.

=== Series 2 (2009–2012) ===
No. overall	No. in series	Title	Directed by	Written by	Original release date	Prod. code
53	1	"Horrid Henry's Favourite Day"	Dave Unwin	Laura Beaumont/ Paul Larson/ Lucinda Whiteley	16 February 2009	201
Henry decides to be nice to Peter on a holiday titled "Be Nice to Your Brother Day" to win a Gross Class Zero video game.
54	2	"Horrid Henry's School Play"	Dave Unwin	Laura Beaumont/ Paul Larson/ Lucinda Whiteley	17 February 2009	212
Henry always wants the lead part in the school play, but this time he clearly doesn't.
55	3	"Horrid Henry and the Best Boy's Club Sleepover"	Dave Unwin	Jimmy Hibbert/ Lucinda Whiteley	18 February 2009	202
Henry invites himself to Peter's sleepover but then chaos invades it.
56	4	"Horrid Henry's Happy Birthday Steve! [sic]"	Dave Unwin	Laura Beaumont/ Paul Larson/ Lucinda Whiteley	19 February 2009	210
An important Football match takes place on the same day as Stuck-Up Steve's Birthday Tea. How can Henry find a way to watch this important match?
57	5	"Horrid Henry Gets a Job"	Franklin J. Griffin	Dave Ingham/ Lucinda Whiteley	20 February 2009	206
Dad decides to get Henry a Saturday Job cleaning up the Park.
58	6	"Perfect Peter's Pen Pal"	Dave Unwin	Toby Rushton/ Lucinda Whiteley	21 February 2009	207
Is Super Sammy, Peter's French Pen Pal really super?
59	7	"Horrid Henry and the Perfect Plant"	Dave Unwin	Toby Rushton/ Lucinda Whiteley	22 February 2009	213
Henry and Peter take turns being gardeners.
60	8	"Horrid Henry's Hiccups"	Dave Unwin	Laura Beaumont/ Paul Larson/ Lucinda Whiteley	6 April 2009	203
Henry gets the Hiccups, and he could possibly break a world record in doing so!
61	9	"Horrid Henry and the Lost Dog"	Dave Unwin	Allan Plenderleith/ Lucinda Whiteley	7 April 2009	204
Henry finds a dog and must make sure that he finds its owner without Mum finding out.
62	10	"Horrid Henry and the Name Game"	Dave Unwin	Lucinda Whiteley	8 April 2009	209
Henry and Peter can't decide what to call a kitten so they call a vote to prove what name it should be.
63	11	"Horrid Henry and the Gross DVD"	Dave Unwin	Dan Berlinka/ Andy Williams/ Lucinda Whiteley	9 April 2009	214
Henry tries to find a way to watch his Gross Class Zero DVD.
64	12	"Horrid Henry and the Big Dig"	Dave Unwin	Lucinda Whiteley	10 April 2009	220
Mum wants to extend her vegetable garden which means taking down Henry's Fort. Can Henry work with Moody Margaret to save his Fort from being taken down?
65	13	"Horrid Henry's Secret Surprise"	Dave Unwin	Laura Beaumont/ Paul Larson/ Lucinda Whiteley	11 April 2009	223
Henry wonders why everyone is being secretive around him.
66	14	"Horrid Henry and the Alien Invasion"	Dave Unwin	Clive Endersby/ Lucinda Whiteley	25 May 2009	205
Henry thinks Margaret has been invaded by Aliens when she suddenly starts being nice to him.
67	15	"Perfect Peter, Popstar"	Dave Unwin	Lucinda Whiteley	26 May 2009	215
Peter is on the way to winning a singing competition, but Moody Margaret wants a piece of the action.
68	16	"Horrid Henry's Smelly Stuff"	Dave Unwin	Dave Ingham/ Lucinda Whiteley	27 May 2009	216
Henry accidentally spills Mum's perfume on the night before her wedding anniversary, so he and Peter must make a batch before she finds out.
69	17	"Horrid Henry Goes Fishing"	Dave Unwin	Dave Ingham/ Lucinda Whiteley	28 May 2009	217
Henry and Dad think that going fishing is better than going shopping.
70	18	"Horrid Henry: Horrid Headmaster"	Dave Unwin	David Ingham/ Lucinda Whiteley	29 May 2009	208
Henry wins an end-of-term competition to let him be Headmaster for the day.
71	19	"Perfect Peter Pumps Up"	Dave Unwin	David Ingham/ Lucinda Whiteley	1 September 2009	211
Henry discovers that Bossy Bill is bullying Peter, so helps Peter stand up to him.
72	20	"Horrid Henry's Heist"	Dave Unwin	Clive Endersby/ Lucinda Whiteley	2 September 2009	219
Henry's class design posters for the school's anniversary party. However Henry's poster will get him into trouble if the teachers see it, so he works with Margaret to retrieve it.
73	21	"Horrid Henry and the Ice Cream Dream"	Dave Unwin	Allan Plenderleith/ Lucinda Whiteley	3 September 2009	222
Henry imagines a world without any ice cream when the ice cream man retires from his job.
74	22	"Horrid Henry's Petsitting Service"	Dave Unwin	Alan MacDonald/ Lucinda Whiteley	4 September 2009	218
Henry tried his hand at Petsitting to make money for buying toys.
75	23	"Horrid Henry and the School Uniform"	Dave Unwin	Dan Berlinka/ Andy Williams/ Lucinda Whiteley	5 September 2009	221
Henry's school tries out School Uniform - but when the teachers take everyone's stuff Henry comes up with a plan to fight back.
76	24	"Horrid Henry on TV"	Dave Unwin	Laura Beaumont/ Paul Larson/ Lucinda Whiteley	6 September 2009	224
Henry, Margaret, and William are all on the TV show Kidswap, and so swap houses for a week.
77	25	"Horrid Henry Cooks a Meal"	Dave Unwin	Toby Rushton/ Lucinda Whiteley	7 September 2009	227
Henry and Peter are in the kitchen, making a romantic meal for Pimply Paul and Prissy Polly, who are babysitting them for the day.
78	26	"Horrid Henry's Happy Family"	Jake J Schutz	Malcolm Williamson/ Lucinda Whiteley	8 September 2009	226
Henry is reluctant to take part in The Happiest Family Contest until he hears that the grand prize is an island getaway.
79	27	"Horrid Henry's Fun Run"	Dave Unwin	Dan Berlinka/ Andy Williams/ Lucinda Whiteley	9 September 2009	229
Mum thinks that the family needs more exercise, so she enters the household into a Fun Run.
80	28	"Horrid Henry's House Party"	Dave Unwin	Jimmy Hibbert/ Lucinda Whiteley	10 September 2009	225
Great-Aunt Greta babysits Peter and Henry while their parents are out for the weekend. However, Henry is up to something great and horrible.
81	29	"Horrid Henry and the Walking Stick Gang"	Dave Unwin	Dan Berlinka/ Andy Williams/ Lucinda Whiteley	2 November 2009	228
Henry and Margaret win the Giving Week competition so have to spend time with the elderly residents of a local care home.
82	30	"Horrid Henry Gets Married"	Dave Unwin	Alan MacDonald/ Lucinda Whiteley	3 November 2009	232
Henry gets knocked out and dreams about being a grownup and marrying Moody Margaret.
83	31	"Horrid Henry: Untouchable"	Dave Unwin	Alan MacDonald / Lucinda Whiteley	4 November 2009	233
While waiting for ballet class to start, Henry catches Miss Battle-Axe and Soggy Sid at a really embarrassing sight - Ballroom Dancing.
84	32	"Horrid Henry and the Green Machine"	Dave Unwin	Dan Berlinka/ Andy Williams/ Lucinda Whiteley	5 November 2009	235
The Family go green and install a wind turbine.
85	33	"Horrid Henry on Trial"	Dave Unwin	Dave Ingham/ Lucinda Whiteley	6 November 2009	239
Peter saves Miss Oddbod's Cat whilst playing football with Henry, but Henry takes the credit so the school decide to hold a court session to see who is telling the truth.
86	34	"Horrid Henry Takes the Biscuit"	Dave Unwin	Lucinda Whiteley	7 November 2009	238
Mum's Biscuits are a big hit with Henry and his class- and he's determined to know what the secret recipe is.
87	35	"Horrid Henry's Haircut"	Dave Unwin	Alan MacDonald/ Lucinda Whiteley	8 November 2009	240
Mum thinks that Henry should get a haircut- at the hairdressers or with Rabid Rebecca?
88	36	"Horrid Henry Gets Spots"	Dave Unwin	Lucinda Whiteley	9 November 2009	243
Henry ends up getting spots on Fame for a Day and is locked in a room by Soggy Sid.
N–A	N–A	"Horrid Henry and the Big Freeze Wheeze"	Dave Unwin	Lucinda Whiteley	10 November 2009	N/A (Note: For unknown reasons, this episode has been removed from the official production order of the series, instead being replaced with Horrid Henry's Winter Wish, which utilizes clips from this episode.)
Henry and Margaret compete for the best snowman to win free Ice Cream.
89	37	"Horrid Henry's Summer Camp"	Dave Unwin	Alan MacDonald/ Lucinda Whiteley	11 November 2009	236
Mum and Dad go to Paris and Henry and Peter go to summer camp where Henry is desperate to escape.
90	38	"Horrid Henry: When I'm King"	Dave Unwin	Malcolm Williamson/ Lucinda Whiteley	12 November 2009	237
Henry imagines what it would really be like if he were king.
91	39	"Horrid Henry Takes a Shortcut"	Dave Unwin	Dave Ingham/ Lucinda Whiteley	13 November 2009	248
Henry and Ralph take a shortcut so they can win a 5 mile race against the Brickhouse Boys.
92	40	"Horrid Henry Changes a Nappy"	Dave Unwin	Lucinda Whiteley	29 November 2009	242
When Prissy Polly and Vomiting Vera come to visit, Henry ends up in a situation in having to change Vera's stinky nappy.
93	41	"Horrid Henry and the Gross Question"	Dave Unwin	Clive Endersby/ Dan Berlinka/ Andy Williams/ Lucinda Whiteley	2 December 2009	244
Henry, Ralph and Margaret are desperate to find the answer to a really gross question in order to win Gross Class Zero prizes.
94	42	"Horrid Henry and the Birthday Present"	Dave Unwin	Clive Endersby/ Dan Berlinka/ Andy Williams/ Lucinda Whiteley	3 December 2009	246
Henry goes shopping with Stuck-Up Steve and Rich Aunt Ruby to find Mum a birthday present.
95	43	"Horrid Henry and the Zombie Hamster"	Dave Unwin	Lucinda Whiteley	4 December 2009	247
Fang the Hamster has gone missing.
96	44	"Horrid Henry Says Goodbye"	Dave Unwin	Lucinda Whiteley	4 December 2009	245
When Henry's Dad gets a new job across the country, Henry's family may have to move away from Ashton.
97	45	"Horrid Henry: Ace Reporter"	Dave Unwin	Lucinda Whiteley	15 February 2010	241
Something fishy is going on with Margaret being the Magazine Queen! Henry and William attempt to find a scoop on the action.
98	46	"Horrid Henry and the Antiques Rogue Show"	Dave Unwin	Dave Ingham/ Lucinda Whiteley	16 February 2010	249
Henry's Dad goes on an Antique show.
99	47	"Horrid Henry and the Go Kart"	Dave Unwin	Allan Plenderleith/ Lucinda Whiteley	17 February 2010	234
Henry and Dad build a Go-Kart ready for a big race.
100	48	"Horrid Henry Goes to the Movies"	Dave Unwin	Alan MacDonald/ Lucinda Whiteley	18 February 2010	251
Henry and Peter go with Prissy Polly, Pimply Paul and Vomiting Vera to see The Happy Hippos movie in the Cinema but Henry wants to see a scary movie.
101	49	"Horrid Henry and the Killer Boy Rats"	Dave Unwin	Lucinda Whiteley	4 March 2010	250
Henry is upset when Ed Banger of The Killer Boy Rats starts singing "Nice" songs.
102	50	"Horrid Henry Meets B.B. Silver"	Dave Unwin	Lucinda Whiteley	4 March 2010	252
It's Take Your Child to Work Day again, and this time Mum is taking Henry where he meets the author of the Gross Class Zero comics.
103	51	"Horrid Henry's Winter Wish"	Dave Unwin	Lucinda Whiteley	23 December 2012 (TV); 3 April 2015 (DVD)	230
Henry thinks his Winter Wish comes true when it snows. Note: This is simply clips from Horrid Henry's Christmas and Horrid Henry and the Big Freeze Wheeze edited together, and is the replacement episode for the latter in production order.
104	52	"Horrid Henry and the Perfect Pirate Parade"	Dave Unwin	Lucinda Whiteley	26 September 2011 (UK DVD); 3 September 2012 (UK TV)	231
Henry invades Moody Margret's Pirate Party. Note: This episode, along with "Horrid Henry's Winter Wish", was produced after Series 3 was completed, and was used to fill space in Series 2's episode order.

=== Series 3 (2011–2012) ===
No. overall	No. in series	Title	Written by	Original release date
105	1	"Horrid Henry: Rockstar!"	Lucinda Whiteley	22 July 2011
Grounded for not doing his homework, Henry is worried that he will miss the Zero Zombie's gig whilst Ralph tries to stop Margaret from getting in it.
106	2	"Horrid Henry and the Special Spinner"	Lucinda Whiteley	22 July 2011
After Mum and Dad ban Henry from everything, Great-Aunt Greta gives him a special spinner.
107	3	"Horrid Henry and the Weird Werewolf"	Lucinda Whiteley/ Alan MacDonald	1 September 2011
Thanks to yet another of Henry's pranks, Peter thinks he's becoming a werewolf.
108	4	"Horrid Henry Delivers a Message"	Dan Berlinka/ Andy Williams/ Lucinda Whiteley	3 September 2011
At first, Henry has to deliver a message to Miss Oddbod from Soggy Sid. Trouble ensures when everything gets all mixed up!
109	5	"Horrid Henry and the Perfect Plane"	Dan Berlinka/ Andy Williams/ Lucinda Whiteley	4 September 2011
Henry and Steve have a plane battle until Steve gets his plane banned from plane flying in the park.
110	6	"Horrid Henry and the Time Manager"	Alan MacDonald/ Lucinda Whiteley	4 September 2011
Dad's time management plan for Henry's family goes too far when everyone gets 5 mins to watch TV so Henry takes over everything.
111	7	"Horrid Henry's Skipping Lesson"	Lucinda Whiteley	5 September 2011
Henry goes to the park with Great Aunt Greta to have a skipping lesson and a picnic.
112	8	"Horrid Henry and the Climbing Frame Clincher"	Dan Berlinka/ Andy Williams/ Lucinda Whiteley	6 September 2011
It's the Purple Hand Gang vs The Secret Club in a war for the school climbing frame!
113	9	"Horrid Henry and the Winning Ticket"	Alan MacDonald/ Lucinda Whiteley	7 September 2011
Henry buys a raffle ticket and thinks he's won the lottery.
114	10	"Horrid Henry and the Booger Bogey"	Lucinda Whiteley	8 September 2011
Henry discovers a booger in his nose and want to show it to his friends.
115	11	"Horrid Henry's Horrible Homework"	Lucinda Whiteley	9 September 2011
Henry's genius homework excuses go too far when his class has to write the hardest essay they've ever been set.
116	12	"Horrid Henry: Aliens Ate My Homework"	Dan Berlinka/ Andy Williams/ Lucinda Whiteley	12 September 2011
Henry delivers his most elaborate homework excuse yet.
117	13	"Horrid Henry: Grown Up"	Dan Berlinka/ Andy Williams/ Lucinda Whiteley	13 September 2011
Henry dreams of himself being a grown-up.
118	14	"Horrid Henry and the Terrible Teacher"	Lucinda Whiteley	31 October 2011
Rabid Rebecca returns as Henry's substitute teacher, and she's come prepared this time until her behaviour at school gets worse and is sent home.
119	15	"Horrid Henry and the Tickly Treats Thief"	Lucinda Whiteley	1 November 2011
Mum's Tickly Treats keep disappearing and Henry gets the blame until Fluffy turns out to be the real culprit.
120	16	"Horrid Henry Goes to the Park"	Dan Berlinka/ Andy Williams/ Lucinda Whiteley	2 November 2011
Horrid Henry's mother urges him to take a walk in the park.
121	17	"Horrid Henry and the Special Spa Day"	Alan MacDonald/ Lucinda Whiteley	3 November 2011
Henry gives Mum a spa treatment as a Mother's Day present. Note: This episode takes place during the events of Perfect Peter's Perfect Day.
122	18	"Horrid Henry and the Day of the Dinosaur"	Dan Berlinka/ Lucinda Whiteley	4 November 2011
Henry feels depressed for a day.
123	19	"Perfect Peter's Perfect Day"	Alan MacDonald/ Lucinda Whiteley	15 January 2012
Dad and Peter go paintballing. Note: This episode takes place during the events of Horrid Henry and the Special Spa Day.
124	20	"Horrid Henry: Alone at Home"	Dan Berlinka/ Lucinda Whiteley	15 January 2012
Mum, Dad and Peter accidentally leave Henry behind at home. A lifetime for Henry!
125	21	"Horrid Henry's Unhappy Day"	Dan Berlinka/ Andy Williams/ Lucinda Whiteley	7 November 2011
Henry goes to get himself the new Gross Class Zero comic, but Moody Margaret snatches it off him.
126	22	"Horrid Henry and the Scary Scooter"	Dan Berlinka/ Lucinda Whiteley	8 November 2011
Horrid Henry finally gets a scooter he has always wanted.
127	23	"Horrid Henry: The Purple Hand Gang Rules O.K!"	Lucinda Whiteley	9 November 2011
Henry decides that he wants a scooter than anything else in the world.
128	24	"Horrid Henry and the Silly Siblings"	Lucinda Whiteley	14 November 2011
Dad's Brother, Francis, comes round for lunch and Henry discovers that even as adults, they still cannot get along.
129	25	"Horrid Henry and the Christening Crisis"	Lucinda Whiteley	10 November 2011
Vera gets lost during her christening.
130	26	"Horrid Henry: Stamp Collector"	Alan MacDonald/ Lucinda Whiteley	11 November 2011
Mum wants Henry to have a hobby and her idea is Henry being a stamp collector like Peter.
131	27	"Horrid Henry: Bogus Babysitter"	Lucinda Whiteley	8 January 2012
Horrid Henry has to babysit Vicious Vicky!
132	28	"Horrid Henry and the Fashion Show"	Lucinda Whiteley	8 January 2012
Henry and Margaret start a fashion show to sell Henry's old clothes. Note: This episode takes place during the events of Moody Margaret, Superstar.
133	29	"Moody Margaret, Superstar"	Lucinda Whiteley	29 January 2012
Moody Margaret wants to be a supreme Superstar at the fashion show. Note: This episode takes place during the events of Horrid Henry and the Fashion Show.
134	30	"Horrid Henry and the Bogey Brain Sleepover"	Lucinda Whiteley	29 January 2012
Henry goes to a Secret Club sleepover at Margaret's house.
135	31	"Horrid Henry and the Movie Star"	Lucinda Whiteley	5 February 2012
Henry gets the part in an Amazing Phantom movie! Note: This episode takes place during the events of Horrid Henry's Perfect Protest.
136	32	"Horrid Henry's Perfect Protest"	Lucinda Whiteley	5 February 2012
Henry proves the director of the movie that his friends have the talent to be in the movie. Note: This episode takes place during the events of Horrid Henry and the Movie Star.
137	33	"Horrid Henry Joins the Best Boys Club"	Alan MacDonald/ Lucinda Whiteley	12 February 2012
Henry becomes a member of the Best Boys Club just to go to Goody-Goody Gordon's birthday party. But things go wrong when he does NOT get his star.
138	34	"Horrid Henry Goes to the Theatre"	Lucinda Whiteley	14 July 2012
Henry does not want to be present at the theater, until he finds out who is performing!
139	35	"Horrid Henry and the Early Christmas Present"	Lucinda Whiteley	15 December 2011
Tired of never getting any birthday or Christmas presents every year, Henry begs his parents to give him one early.
140	36	"Horrid Henry and the Boodle Poodle"	Lucinda Whiteley	21 July 2012
Fang is challenged by a Boodle Poodle.
141	37	"Horrid Henry and the New Best Friend"	Alan MacDonald/ Lucinda Whiteley	21 July 2012
There's a new girl in Henry's class and she turns out to be more trouble than she seems when she blames Henry for everything.
142	38	"Horrid Henry: Horrid Boy?"	Lucinda Whiteley	19 February 2012
Mum wants Henry to stop being horrid for a week.
143	39	"Horrid Henry: So Not a Girl!"	Lucinda Whiteley	19 February 2012
Margaret teaches Susan how to be a girl and life as a leader.
144	40	"Horrid Henry: Here to Entertain You!"	Lucinda Whiteley	28 July 2012
Henry becomes an entertainer and Margaret's party is crashed when Peter is, too.
145	41	"Horrid Henry in Detention"	Dan Berlinka/ Andy Williams/ Lucinda Whiteley	12 February 2012
Henry's latest prank leads to his entire class getting detention, and on the same day as an important Ashton Juniors football match!
146	42	"Horrid Henry and the Code Crackers"	Dan Berlinka/ Lucinda Whiteley	22 January 2012
Henry enlists the help of his friends to break a mysterious code.
147	43	"Horrid Henry: My Weird Family"	Alan MacDonald/ Lucinda Whiteley	28 July 2012
Henry's family take part on Family Fresh Air Day.
148	44	"Horrid Henry: It's All Your Fault!"	Lucinda Whiteley	4 August 2012
Henry feels like he gets the blame for everything.
149	45	"Horrid Henry: Rocking the World"	Lucinda Whiteley	4 August 2012
Henry helps Rude Ralph to persuade his dreams.
150	46	"Horrid Henry: Nothing But the Truth"	Lucinda Whiteley	11 August 2012
Peter has had enough of Henry's horridness.
151	47	"Horrid Henry Delivers the Milk"	Lucinda Whiteley	11 August 2012
Henry goes to work with Pimply Paul delivering the milk.
152	48	"Horrid Henry Goes Gross"	Dan Berlinka/ Lucinda Whiteley	18 August 2012
Henry finds out who spies on his Purple Hand Gang.
153	49	"Horrid Henry: Money Talks"	Lucinda Whiteley	18 August 2012
Henry has been brought face-to-face with Margaret.
154	50	"Horrid Henry Sells the School"	Lucinda Whiteley	25 August 2012
When Miss Oddbod suggests to "sell the school", Henry and Margaret take it too seriously.
155	51	"Horrid Henry and the King of Bling"	Lucinda Whiteley	25 August 2012
Henry begs Dad for a new mobile phone, while Peter's DJ gift from Great-Aunt Greta has gone too far.
156	52	"Horrid Henry Goes Bananas"	Lucinda Whiteley	1 September 2012
A banana starts a series of problems for Henry.

=== Series 4 (2014–2015) ===
In 2013, another 52 episodes of Horrid Henry were commissioned and set to first premiere in late 2014. This is also the last season to air on CITV.

No. overall	No. in series	Title	Directed by	Written by	Original release date
157	1	"Horrid Henry's Comic Caper"	Dave Unwin	Lucinda Whiteley	11 October 2014
Mum keeps Henry's comic when he has to do chores.
158	2	"Horrid Henry Knows It All"	Dave Unwin	Lucinda Whiteley	12 October 2014
Henry completes a difficult quiz to win Gross Class Zero tickets.
159	3	"Horrid Henry Does His Homework"	Dave Unwin	Lucinda Whiteley	18 October 2014
Henry does his homework, and for real this time.
160	4	"Horrid Henry and the Horrid Hat"	Dave Unwin	Lucinda Whiteley	20 December 2014
Soggy Sid thinks that wearing warm winter clothes is not appropriate for the snow.
161	5	"Horrid Henry's Hit Song"	Dave Unwin	Lucinda Whiteley	19 October 2014
Henry makes a hit song but becomes annoying when loads of people want to join in.
162	6	"Horrid Henry Flicks the Bogey"	Dave Unwin	Lucinda Whiteley	16 November 2014
Henry's yoyo is confiscated, so how can he get it back?
163	7	"Horrid Henry: I Am Not a Hamster"	Dave Unwin	Lucinda Whiteley	26 October 2014
Mum says that Fang is "So Not a Hamster". However, he soon proves himself when Henry has trouble with sorting socks.
164	8	"Horrid Henry Plays Air Guitar"	Dave Unwin	Lucinda Whiteley	1 November 2014
Henry is having a really bad day, until Great Aunt Greta and Doddery Donald come round for lunch.
165	9	"Horrid Henry and the Dangerous Data"	Dave Unwin	Lucinda Whiteley	7 December 2014
Henry learns that data can be dangerous when Peter becomes Chief Secretary of the Purple Hand Gang.
166	10	"Horrid Henry and the Perfect Parents"	Dave Unwin	Lucinda Whiteley	8 November 2014
Henry imagines if his parents were Perfect, but soon regrets it.
167	11	"Horrid Henry and the Single Sock Saga"	Dave Unwin	Lucinda Whiteley	2 November 2014
Henry searches for a missing sock with big help from Vera.
168	12	"Horrid Henry Tells the Truth"	Dave Unwin	Lucinda Whiteley	15 November 2014
Margaret thinks Henry stole her mobile mirror.
169	13	"Horrid Henry and the Phantom Phone"	Dave Unwin	Lucinda Whiteley	30 November 2014
Henry borrows Ralph's phone and it gets confiscated.
170	14	"Horrid Henry Loses Rude Ralph"	Dave Unwin	Lucinda Whiteley	22 November 2014
Rude Ralph is missing, and Henry is desperate to find out where he's gone.
171	15	"Horrid Henry: Eco Warrior"	Dave Unwin	Lucinda Whiteley	23 November 2014
A competition between Peter and Henry happens when Henry becomes a recycling ambassador.
172	16	"Horrid Henry Gives It All Away"	Dave Unwin	Lucinda Whiteley	13 December 2014
Henry gives all his toys away so he can visit toy heaven.
173	17	"Horrid Henry Rewrites the Rules"	Dave Unwin	Lucinda Whiteley	25 October 2014
Peter encourages Henry to rewrite the Purple Hand Gang rules to make everyone happy.
174	18	"Horrid Henry's Marvellous Motto"	Dave Unwin	Lucinda Whiteley	14 December 2014
Henry and Margaret go to war to create a new motto for the school.
175	19	"Horrid Henry's Daring Deed"	Dave Unwin	Lucinda Whiteley	7 March 2015
Henry is not ready for school on the first day of term.
176	20	"Horrid Henry Goes to School"	Dave Unwin	Lucinda Whiteley	29 November 2014
Henry is late for school and everywhere is locked.
177	21	"Horrid Henry Takes the Blame"	Dave Unwin	Lucinda Whiteley	9 November 2014
Henry wonders why he is taken the blame for everything.
178	22	"Horrid Henry and the Purple Pass"	Dave Unwin	Lucinda Whiteley	28 December 2014
Henry invents a 'Purple Pass'.
179	23	"Horrid Henry Meets Mr. Tiddler"	Dave Unwin	Lucinda Whiteley	27 December 2014
Peter is desperate to meet the author who wrote stories about a character called Mr. Tiddler.
180	24	"Horrid Henry's Movie Moments"	Dave Unwin	Lucinda Whiteley	14 March 2015
Henry explains why he held hands with Margaret at "Our Lady Giddiantus" in his own movie.
181	25	"Horrid Henry: Hashtag Henry"	Dave Unwin	Lucinda Whiteley	28 February 2015
Peter solves a mystery about a hashtag.
182	26	"Horrid Henry Goes on Strike"	Dave Unwin	Lucinda Whiteley	28 February 2015
Getting tired of being punished for little things by Miss Battle-Axe, Henry decides to go on strike.
183	27	"Moody Margaret for President"	Dave Unwin	Lucinda Whiteley	6 December 2014
Moody Margaret decides to become a president of the free world and Henry is excited to have her out of his life.
184	28	"Horrid Henry and the Perfect Panto"	Dave Unwin	Lucinda Whiteley	21 December 2014
After the school play is cancelled, Moody Margaret refuses to accept defeat.
185	29	"Horrid Henry and the Catastrophic Cushion"	Dave Unwin	Lucinda Whiteley	8 March 2015
Henry gets a Gross Class Zero cushion.
186	30	"Horrid Henry's Birthday Bonanza"	Dave Unwin	Lucinda Whiteley	28 March 2015
Henry isn't impressed that it's his birthday again.
187	31	"Horrid Henry Helps Out"	Dave Unwin	Lucinda Whiteley	21 March 2015
Henry wonders if Dad is overworking himself.
188	32	"Horrid Henry's Vile Vacation"	Dave Unwin	Lucinda Whiteley	15 March 2015
Henry thinks that he is going on holiday to somewhere exciting and realistic but ends up somewhere very boring.
189	33	"Horrid Henry's Mighty Mission"	Dave Unwin	Lucinda Whiteley	29 March 2015
King Henry and his team go on a mission to save something.
190	34	"Horrid Henry and the Game Changer"	Dave Unwin	Lucinda Whiteley	4 April 2015
Margaret decides to 'change the game'.
191	35	"Horrid Henry: Who's Who?"	Dave Unwin	Lucinda Whiteley	12 April 2015
Henry discovers that the entire class have swapped personalities!
192	36	"Horrid Henry: Good Morning Henry!"	Dave Unwin	Lucinda Whiteley	12 September 2015
Henry wonders how everyone's morning has been.
193	37	"Horrid Henry Gets the Message"	Dave Unwin	Lucinda Whiteley	5 April 2015
Henry doesn't get a message, or does he?
194	38	"Horrid Henry Gets the Gig"	Dave Unwin	Lucinda Whiteley	22 March 2015
A competition goes on with Henry and Margaret in regards to the Zero Zombies.
195	39	"Horrid Henry and the Detention Club"	Dave Unwin	Lucinda Whiteley	13 September 2015
Mr. Soggington makes up a 'Detention Club' on the weekend for people who need detention. It then becomes fun with a good story.
196	40	"Horrid Henry and the Raid of the Century"	Dave Unwin	Lucinda Whiteley	11 April 2015
Henry and Ralph plan a very powerful raid.
197	41	"Horrid Henry and the Phantom Fish Filcher"	Dave Unwin	Lucinda Whiteley	19 September 2015
When Henry brings Vomiting Vera into school, she proves handy when Goldilocks, Soggy Sid's fish - goes missing.
198	42	"Horrid Henry and the Tongue Twisters"	Dave Unwin	Lucinda Whiteley	20 September 2015
Henry is given some Toffee Tongue Twisters by Great-Aunt Greta during Peter's Birthday Party.
199	43	"Horrid Henry and the Number Gnomes Knowhow"	Dave Unwin	Lucinda Whiteley	26 September 2015
A Math test is coming up, and Henry doesn't know what to do.
200	44	"Horrid Henry is Too Cool for School"	Dave Unwin	Lucinda Whiteley	27 September 2015
Is Henry Too Cool For School?
201	45	"Horrid Henry's Animal Antics"	Dave Unwin	Lucinda Whiteley	3 October 2015
A boodle poodle moves into Margaret's.
202	46	"Horrid Henry: How to Be Horrid"	Dave Unwin	Lucinda Whiteley	4 October 2015
Henry teaches the viewers and Margaret how to be horrid.
203	47	"Horrid Henry's Top Ten Things"	Dave Unwin	Lucinda Whiteley	10 October 2015
Henry writes a list of his Top Ten Things.
204	48	"Horrid Henry Mixes It Up"	Dave Unwin	Lucinda Whiteley	11 October 2015
Henry and Ralph become teachers for the day.
205	49	"Horrid Henry and the Evil Mastermind"	Dave Unwin	Lucinda Whiteley	17 October 2015
Miss Battle-Axe is acting very weird and Henry and his classmates see if Miss B has been controlled by an evil mastermind.
206	50	"Horrid Henry and the Miserable Musical"	Dave Unwin	Lucinda Whiteley	18 October 2015
A song is coming on.
207	51	"Horrid Henry's Big Breakfast"	Dave Unwin	Lucinda Whiteley	24 October 2015
Henry completes a challenge and a part of it includes being horrid. This may not sound anything like breakfasts, but it will become clear when it comes to the show!
208	52	"Horrid Henry Looks at Love"	Dave Unwin	Lucinda Whiteley	25 October 2015
Henry discovers what love is.

=== Series 5 (2018–2019) ===
In May 2018, a fifth series was commissioned by Novel Entertainment with another 42 episodes, 10 less than the previous 4 series, making it 250. Netflix premiered the first 12 episodes on 15 December 2018, then 10 more episodes premiered on 14 January 2019, followed with the rest of the series on 17 May 2019. A screening of 3 new episodes was hosted by Dick and Dom in a BAFTA Kids preview at the Princess Anne Royal Theatre, London on 17 November 2018. Another screening of 3 new episodes took place in a BFI Funday TV Preview on 17 February 2019.

No. overall	No. in series	Title	Directed by	Written by	Original release date
209	1	"Horrid Henry's Uber Homework"	Dave Unwin	Lucinda Whiteley	17 November 2018
Henry starts a service that claims to get homework completed. Henry calls on Peter when he ends up with more homework than he initially expected.
210	2	"Horrid Henry and the Lucky Thing"	Dave Unwin	Lucinda Whiteley	15 December 2018
Mum accidentally throws away an object Henry is sure that gives good luck.
211	3	"Horrid Henry: Mi Casa Es Tu Casa"	Dave Unwin	Lucinda Whiteley	14 May 2019
Sharing is something that Henry and Peter dislike doing, but is there anything they can do about it?
212	4	"Horrid Henry's Magic Mayhem"	Dave Unwin	Lucinda Whiteley	15 December 2018
A magic wand can do anything, which Henry and his friends aren't suspecting.
213	5	"Horrid Henry's Titanic TV"	Dave Unwin	Lucinda Whiteley	15 December 2018
Henry fakes being sick to take the day off school, but Dad lets him stay home. A flatscreen television arrives the same day, and Henry and Dad try to set it up.
214	6	"Horrid Henry and the 3D Nightmare"	Dave Unwin	Lucinda Whiteley	15 December 2018
Henry loans a 3D printer from Brian, and they become inventors.
215	7	"Horrid Henry's Class Action"	Dave Unwin	Lucinda Whiteley	15 December 2018
Henry runs for School Council, but finds an unsuspecting rival along the way.
216	8	"Horrid Henry: Silence is Golden"	Dave Unwin	Lucinda Whiteley	15 December 2018
Henry and Peter are tasked to keep quiet so Mum can focus. Henry is eventually motivated to keep quiet when Dad offers to buy a pizza if they remain quiet.
217	9	"Horrid Henry: Good Day, Bad Day"	Dave Unwin	Lucinda Whiteley	18 January 2019
Mum starts a system for keeping track of Henry and Peter's behaviour, and Henry is persuaded to be good so he can win tickets to a movie.
218	10	"Horrid Henry and the Pet Show"	Dave Unwin	Lucinda Whiteley	15 December 2018
Henry is told about a pet show that he is not interested in. However, Fang wants to participate.
219	11	"Horrid Henry and the Snotslimer Redemption"	Dave Unwin	Lucinda Whiteley	14 May 2019
Fang goes off to retrieve Henry's snotslimer after it is taken off of him. Fang also finds a cult-like group of hamsters that ran away.
220	12	"Horrid Henry and the Germy Germ"	Dave Unwin	Lucinda Whiteley	17 November 2018
Sweets are being handed out to pupils at school and Henry wants to get one. Henry also has to get given an injection that has a very low chance of being given to a pupil.
221	13	"Horrid Henry: Eternal Schoolboy"	Dave Unwin	Lucinda Whiteley	16 January 2019
Henry sees what the world would be like if he didn't age. He finds some unexpected paths in the student's lives.
222	14	"Horrid Henry: How to Be Good"	Dave Unwin	Lucinda Whiteley	17 January 2019
Henry has to be good to get a special treat.
223	15	"Horrid Henry: Planet of the Grapes"	Dave Unwin	Lucinda Whiteley	16 January 2019
Henry tricks Peter into convincing him that he has found a planet through his telescope. Peter does not know that the supposed planet is actually a grape.
224	16	"Horrid Henry and the Marvellous Mind Reader"	Dave Unwin	Lucinda Whiteley	15 December 2018
Henry gets stunned when he thinks that Peter can read his mind.
225	17	"Horrid Henry and the Red Roof Gang"	Dave Unwin	Lucinda Whiteley	14 January 2019
Margaret demands Ralph to make his own club.
226	18	"Horrid Henry: Open for Business"	Dave Unwin	Lucinda Whiteley	14 May 2019
Henry creates a new delivery service.
227	19	"Horrid Henry's Parents Evening"	Dave Unwin	Lucinda Whiteley	14 May 2019
Mum and Dad go to Henry's Parents Evening, but find a nasty surprise along the way.
228	20	"Horrid Henry's Teacher Talk"	Dave Unwin	Lucinda Whiteley	18 January 2019
Mum and Dad go out to Peter's Parents Evening, but find themselves talking about Henry instead.
229	21	"Horrid Henry's Girl Talk"	Dave Unwin	Lucinda Whiteley	15 January 2019
Margaret introduces Henry to the art of "Girl Talk".
230	22	"Horrid Henry: King Henry the Ninth"	Dave Unwin	Lucinda Whiteley	17 November 2018
Henry finds a false family tree chart, that was made to fool Henry's dad, that claims he is a descendant of King Henry VIII.
231	23	"Horrid Henry and the Awful Author"	Dave Unwin	Lucinda Whiteley	17 January 2019
Henry's life stories are stolen by an author, so he takes revenge.
232	24	"Horrid Henry and the Detention Diva"	Dave Unwin	Lucinda Whiteley	14 January 2019
Henry has a rival on his hands in the form of Perfect Peter, who wants to be horrid.
233	25	"Horrid Henry: Anything You Can Do"	Dave Unwin	Lucinda Whiteley	14 May 2019
Henry learns how to play the cello, and Peter reveals that he has been practising air guitar in secret.
234	26	"Horrid Henry and the Funny Bunny Hop"	Dave Unwin	Lucinda Whiteley	14 May 2019
Henry makes up a new improved version of a popular game, but not the way he wanted.
235	27	"Horrid Henry: My So Called Life"	Dave Unwin	Lucinda Whiteley	21 May 2019
Margaret unveils her multiple YouGroove channels, one of which is poking fun at Henry. He then tries to convince Margaret to take them down.
236	28	"Horrid Henry: The Road to Nowhere"	Dave Unwin	Lucinda Whiteley	15 January 2019
Peter's new Sat-Nav takes the family on a crazy road trip.
237	29	"Horrid Henry: Make Believe"	Dave Unwin	Lucinda Whiteley	14 May 2019
Are the birds sitting near the Purple Hand Fort a source of good luck or bad luck?
238	30	"Horrid Henry Joins the Secret Club"	Dave Unwin	Lucinda Whiteley	19 May 2019
Henry rewrites membership rules for the Purple Hand Gang, but gets more than he bargained for.
239	31	"Horrid Henry and the Demon Dentist"	Dave Unwin	Lucinda Whiteley	15 December 2018
Mum books a dentist after a prank call caused by Margaret.
240	32	"Horrid Henry and the Jumper Jinx"	Dave Unwin	Lucinda Whiteley	19 May 2019
Henry sits on a worm that he couldn't see, so he gets into an inescapable situation.
241	33	"Horrid Henry: Double Trouble"	Dave Unwin	Lucinda Whiteley	19 May 2019
Henry has a dream where he gets a clone of himself.
242	34	"Horrid Henry and the Dream Drone"	Dave Unwin	Lucinda Whiteley	14 May 2019
Henry wants a new drone after seeing that Ralph has it and that he gets to miss school. The teachers also don't seem to know that Ralph is controlling a drone.
243	35	"Horrid Henry's Home Improvement"	Dave Unwin	Lucinda Whiteley	14 May 2019
Margaret plans to build an improved Secret Club Treehouse.
244	36	"Horrid Henry's Most Horrid Day Ever"	Dave Unwin	Lucinda Whiteley	21 May 2019
Soggy Sid finds himself in the middle of a crime at the bank, and finds what seems to be a piece of Henry's shirt, so he suspects that Henry is behind it.
245	37	"Horrid Henry Stays Up All Night"	Dave Unwin	Lucinda Whiteley	14 May 2019
Henry attends Moody Margaret's sleepover.
246	38	"Horrid Henry and the Hotel Horrid"	Dave Unwin	Lucinda Whiteley	20 May 2019
Henry creates a hotel at his house and gains an unsuspected visitor.
247	39	"Horrid Henry Wins the Cup"	Dave Unwin	Lucinda Whiteley	19 May 2019
Henry goes off to the Brainbox of the Year competition. Note: This episode takes place during the events of Horrid Henry and the Terrific Teenager, Horrid Henry and the Measly Mascot and Horrid Henry: The Great Escape, except focusing on Henry.
248	40	"Horrid Henry: The Great Escape"	Dave Unwin	Lucinda Whiteley	21 May 2019
Mum and Dad go for a romantic weekend out of town, but it is not the kind they wanted. Note: This episode takes place during the events of Horrid Henry and the Measly Mascot, Horrid Henry and the Terrific Teenager and Horrid Henry Wins the Cup, except focusing on Mum and Dad and in some cases, Fang and Fluffy at home.
249	41	"Horrid Henry and the Terrific Teenager"	Dave Unwin	Lucinda Whiteley	21 May 2019
Peter goes to Great-Aunt Greta's house for the weekend, to which she is still concerned that Peter is a teenager. Note: This episode takes place during the events of Horrid Henry Wins the Cup, Horrid Henry: The Great Escape and Horrid Henry and the Measly Mascot, except focusing on Peter and in some cases, Fang and Fluffy at home.
250	42	"Horrid Henry and the Measly Mascot"	Dave Unwin	Lucinda Whiteley	21 May 2019
Peter narrates Henry's trip to the "Brain Box of the Year" competition. Note: This episode takes place during the events of Horrid Henry Wins the Cup, Horrid Henry Reads a book, Horrid Henry and the Terrific Teenager and Horrid Henry: The Great Escape, except focusing on Henry with Peter narrating the majority of the episode.

== Specials ==
In September 2020, it was announced that Novel would be producing new 1-hour specials of Horrid Henry for Netflix, after the successful launch of Horrid Henry's Wild Weekend. Plans for two specials titled Horrid Henry Goes Gross Class Zero and Horrid Henry: The Origin Story were once announced to be development on Novel Entertainment's website, but nothing has been said about them since then.

No.	Title	Original release date
1	"Horrid Henry's Wild Weekend"	21 October 2019 (DVD); 6 June 2020 (Netflix)
Henry is chosen as one of the entries for the Brainbox of the Year competition, Peter stays with Great-Aunt Greta, while Mum and Dad go on a Great Escape out of Ashton. Note: This is a 45-minute feature-length version of four Season 5 episodes - Horrid Henry Wins the Cup, Horrid Henry: The Great Escape, Horrid Henry and the Measly Mascot and Horrid Henry and the Terrific Teenager.
2	"Horrid Henry's Gross Day Out"	17 September 2020 (Netflix)
When Mum goes out of the house, Henry takes advantage of his babysitter Mad Martin's obliviousness and watches the Gross Class Zero marathon. However, when the show comes to life within Henry and Peter's eyes, they are now on a mission with the Gross Class Zero crew to defeat the Evil Emperor - Darius Drek, and his children; Drusilla Drek and Damian Drek, and save the universe before it's too late. Note: This is an original 60-minute special.

== See also ==
- Horrid Henry
- Horrid Henry: The Movie
