= Horrid Henry (book) =

First book of the Horrid Henry series by Francesca Simon

- The cover for the first UK paperback edition
- Author: Francesca Simon
- Illustrator: Tony Ross
- Cover artist: Tony Ross
- Language: English
- Series: Horrid Henry
- Genre: Fantasy
- Publisher: Orion Publishing Group
- Publication date: 1994
- Publication place: United Kingdom
- Media type: Print (hardback)
- Pages: 96
- ISBN: 978-1-85881-070-6
- Followed by: Horrid Henry and the Secret Club

Horrid Henry is the first book of the Horrid Henry series. It was published in 1994 and written by Francesca Simon and illustrated by Tony Ross. The book is a collection of short stories about the same characters, along the lines of the Just William books.

== Plot ==
=== Horrid Henry's Perfect Day ===
Horrid Henry is a boy who loves doing unimaginable horrible things. He throws food, he snatches things, he pushes, shoves and pinches. He has a younger brother named Perfect Peter, an extremely perfect boy who does uncountable good deeds. Peter always says "please" and "thank you", loves vegetables and refuses cake, and never ever picks his nose. One day, Horrid Henry wonders what would happen if he was perfect like Peter. The next day, Henry doesn't wake Peter up by splashing water on his head as usual, which causes them to arrive late for class. Back at home, Henry doesn't bully Peter and instead spends time reading. At dinner time, Henry helps lay the table and ignores Peter's whining that he always lays the table. When the family eat spaghetti and meatballs, Henry does not kick Peter or slurp his food or leave behind his vegetables. Wanting Henry to become horrid again, Peter tries many ways to get Henry to hit him, yet Henry is resilient. When Henry's mum gives Henry some fudge cake and a kiss for being so good, a frustrated Peter flings his plate at Henry but hits Mum by accident. Enraged, Mum sends Peter to his room, and Henry too when he laughs. The story ends with Henry being surprised that being perfect was so much fun.

=== Horrid Henry's Dance Class ===
Henry and Peter attend the school's dance class taught by Miss Impatience Tutu, a very impatient woman who claims to be patient that Henry despises. The class is preparing for an upcoming concert, and everyone is practicing for it. After a series of antics, Impatience Tutu makes Henry sit behind a false bush so he won't embarrass everyone at the concert. At the night of the concert, Henry decides to make his part bigger and by doing so, he ends up ruining the show by accident, causing Impatience Tutu to expel him from dance class. Henry is satisfied, being finally allowed to go to karate class.

=== Horrid Henry & Moody Margaret ===
Horrid Henry has an archenemy; Moody Margaret. She is in Henry's class, lives next door to him, and owns all the things that Henry's parents don't let him have. Henry only plays with her as all of his other friends are busy. The two of them are playing pirates and bickering over who is going to be Captain Hook, while Peter begs to not be the prisoner. Eventually, Margaret reluctantly hands over her role as Captain Hook to Henry and takes his role as Mr. Smee. When Henry orders her and Peter to walk the plank, she gets fed up and decides to stop playing pirates. Henry orders her to carry on, but Margaret shrieks at him until Henry gives her back the hook. Margaret then decides to have a snack in Henry's kitchen, but Henry refuses to share his food with her and gives her horrible cookies. When he mentions "Glop" (a dish of horrible foods mixed together), Margaret decides that she and Henry make the yuckiest Glop of all and eat it. After putting in many different ingredients, Margaret eats a spoonful of it and doesn't show how much she hates it, in fact stating that it is good. When Henry refuses to eat but a tiny spoonful, Margaret picks up a large spoonful of Glop, but is interrupted by a hungry Peter before things go too far. Henry gives Peter the Glop.

=== Horrid Henry's Holiday ===
Henry hates holidays. He has a very specific idea of what constitutes an ideal holiday, but his parents always have other plans. But when his family tell him they are going camping in France, he gets excited. However, their destination doesn't meet Henry's expectations. He tries to knock down tents and play loud music, but Dad stops him. Just as they are about to eat baked beans, it rains. The family sleeps in the tent soundly, but Henry stays awake all night due to the sharp rocks and mosquitoes. The next morning, the family goes for a walk, leaving Henry to collect firewood. Henry uses the dry, wooden pegs holding up the tents as firewood, as well as pegs from other tents nearby. During the night, Henry wakes up only to discover that the tent has flooded and collapsed. Henry then convinces his family to go to the other campsite, and the story ends with the family eating crisps and watching TV.

== Publication history ==
- The book was originally published in hardback in Great Britain, 1994.
- It was first published in paperback in 1995.
- It was reissued in paperback in 2008.
- "Horrid Henry's Holiday" and "Horrid Henry and Moody Margaret" have been reprinted individually as part of the Early Readers series, aimed at younger children, with colour illustrations in 2009 and 2010 respectively.
- "Horrid Henry's Holiday" has been reprinted in Horrid Henry's Wicked Ways.
- "Horrid Henry and Moody Margaret" has been reprinted in Horrid Henry's Evil Enemies.
- "Horrid Henry's Dance Class" has been reprinted in Horrid Henry Rules The World.
- The whole book has been reprinted in A Handful of Horrid Henry.

== Television adaptation ==
Horrid Henry is a British animated series, based on the popular book series of the same name. It is produced by Novel Entertainment for CITV and has been broadcast since 2006. Currently, it is aired on Nicktoons and Netflix. There are 250 episodes within 5 series.

- "Horrid Henry's Perfect Day", "Horrid Henry's Dance Class" and "Horrid Henry's Holiday" were all episodes from the Horrid Henry TV series, adapted respectively by Alan MacDonald and James Henry
- The making of "Glop" from "Horrid Henry and Moody Margaret" was used as a challenge between Henry and Margaret in the episode "Horrid Henry and the Secret Club" except that Margaret didn't eat the "Glop".
