= Dream Street (British TV series) =

- Genre: Children's
- Written by: Ross Hastings; Paul Larson; Chris Trengove; George Tarry; Tim Quinn; Jason Quinn; John Gatehouse; Stuart Galloway; Ian Davis
- Directed by: Brian Johnson
- Voices of: Charlotte Bellamy; Emma Tate; Chris Jarvis; Dave Benson Phillips; Russ Abbot
- Narrated by: Russ Abbot
- Music by: Tom Sayers
- Country of origin: United Kingdom
- Original language: English
- No. of series: 5
- No. of episodes: 65 + 1 Christmas Special

Production
- Producer: Nigel Stone
- Running time: 9 minutes
- Production company: Dream Street Productions Limited (Note: Credited as Dream Street Ltd. in later seasons.)

Original release
- Network: ITV (CITV)
- Release: 6 May 1999 – 7 October 2002

Dream Street is a British children's television series that ran from 6 May 1999 to 2002 on CITV, and from 7 October 2002 to 28 February 2003 on Nick Jr UK. The show is narrated by British comedian Russ Abbot, and was aimed at children aged from 2 to 7. The show features talking toy vehicles, which were radio controlled in real time.

== Characters ==
- Buddy – a young pickup truck with various removable accessories, and the main character of the show as well as Daisy's best friend. He loves to help out his friends with magic. He has a yellow livery with the red B on both doors and he has a red circle with a red B for his nose. His catchphrase is, "It's Magic Time!". He is voiced by Charlotte Bellamy.
- Daisy Do-right – a small 'panda car' police car who is Buddy's best friend. She works with the police and hates it when her Sleeping Policemen fall asleep on patrol (they have narcolepsy). She is responsible for giving do-right duties to characters who do silly things. She also loves to visit the field full of daisies. She has a white livery with pink and orange checkers on the sides and she has a daisy for her nose. Just like Buddy, she is voiced by Charlotte Bellamy.
- Half-Pint – a small, young, and shy milk float. He now likes sleeping in the dark and can be afraid of other things. In the episode "King of the Road", Half-Pint gets bullied by Hot Rodney about being slow, whilst in the episode "Midnight Monstering", he could not sleep last night due to his broken night light. He is voiced by Emma Tate.
- Hot Rodney – a brash, naughty, and reckless hot rod car. In the episode "Building Block Blunder", he shows a helpful side by shunting the building blocks to allow Buddy and Hot-Air to get free after the blocks had collapsed. He has teal livery with flames. He is voiced by Chris Jarvis.
- Hot Air – a strange 3-wheeled vehicle "bug", resembling a balloon on wheels. He travels around Dream Street by driving in reverse and communicates by making noises of a whoopee cushion. He is sometimes very naughty. In the episode "Check Up", he was tricked by Jack and Rodney that he has the case of the "Spotty Botty Bug". Also, in "Beep Beep!!" he takes Rodney's air horn and soon enough Buddy gets him one too.
- Jack Hammer – a pneumatic drill, who can be mischievous like Hot Air and Rodney. In "Building Block Blunder", he ties Hot Air to a lamp post to trick Buddy into thinking he had broken down, which ends up causing an accident that leaves both Buddy and Hot Air trapped in a mess of collapsed building blocks. He wears a blue cap on backwards. He is voiced by Dave Benson Phillips.
- The Wild Bunch – a group of traffic cones which like to cause nothing but trouble.
- Ice Cool – a laid-back and relaxed ice cream van that has a large ice cream cone quiff, who likes to help out serve ice creams to his friends. He is voiced by Dave Benson Phillips.
- The Sleeping Policemen – pedestrian crossings literally consisting of slumbering police constables covered with striped blankets. Their respective names are PC Snooze, PC Snore, and PC Nod Off. They work with Daisy very well and are always very lazy. They sometimes don't pay attention to what they are doing. PC Snooze has pastel green skin with a deep Cockney accent, PC Snore has pastel peach skin with a Birmingham accent, and PC Nod Off has pastel lavender skin with a high Yorkshire accent. They are all voiced by Russ Abbot.
- The Gossips – a pair of traffic lights respectively named Scarlet & Amber who like to make the road safe and sometimes cause serious accidents. They are smart and responsible too. They are both voiced by Chris Jarvis.
- Tech – a grey mechanical robot whose magical powers enable Buddy to take on different roles. His Catchphrase is "Electric Elephants". He is voiced by Russ Abbot.
- Other characters include two unnamed small three wheeled cars. One has a red and yellow livery and the other has a red and blue livery.

== List of episodes ==
Title	Written by
"Hot Air"	Ross Hastings
When Buddy comes across Daisy Do Right with her tyres let down, it is clear that Hot Air is on the loose. Hot Air sucks the air out of tyres leaving cars feeling flat and low.
"Jumping Jack"	Barrie Hemsley
Hot Rodney sets Jack to do dares to hang out with him, he does well with the first few but when Jack gets to the last double dare he gets stuck in a trumpet.
"Dinosaur"	George Tarry
Half-Pint thinks there's a real dinosaur in Dream Street so he and Jack Hammer hatch a plan to catch it only to catch Daisy instead.
"Code Red"	Barrie Hemsley
The Gossips are sick of Ice Cool and start a traffic jam to teach him a lesson, however Daisy disapproves both of them and give them a do-right duty.
"Bossy Boot"	Ross Hastings
Jack Hammer is given the job of supervising the Dream Street roadworks gang, but the power of his position goes to his head.
"Musical Madness"	Chris Trengove
Ice Cool is playing loud music in Dream Street, the Gossips however get annoyed and ask the Sleeping Policemen to arrest him.
"Tech's Magical Carnival"	Ross Hastings
Tech goes missing on the day of his very own carnival and Jack thinks it's because of a joke he made about him.
"King of the Road"	Ross Hastings
Rodney bullies Half-Pint about how he is faster than him. However Buddy challenges him to a race and if he wins, Hot Rodney has to stop bullying Half-Pint.
"Treasure Hunt"	Ross Hastings
Daisy holds a special chocolate egg hunt but Jack takes them all for himself.
"Surprise, Surprise"	Ross Hastings
It's Buddy's birthday and Daisy is throwing a secret party for Buddy but no one can tell him and he gets upset everyone has forgotten, but at the end he is relieved when the party happens.
"By the Book"	Ross Hastings
It is Daisy's police test and she is worried she will fail, so Jack and The Wild Bunch take it upon themselves and become thieves for the day to help Daisy practice then send all the Sleeping Policemen off to sleep to then steal the Big Book of Law.
"Happy Butterday"	Ross Hastings
The Wild Bunch have spread butter all over Skipping Rope Bridge and when PC Snooze comes up to stop them, they push him down and he gets stuck in a pipe. It is also the anniversary of Amber and Scarlet and Tech makes a cake for them.
"Snoring & Touring"	Ross Hastings
The Sleeping Policemen decide they need a holiday and ask for advice, but end up going to The Land of Nod. Sadly though, they reach the top of Skipping Rope Bridge, fall asleep, roll all the way down and end up sleeping through the whole of their holiday and not going anywhere. Meanwhile, Tech misses travelling and Buddy decides to cheer him up.
"Over the Rainbow"	Ross Hastings
A rainbow appears in Dream Street and Jack and Rodney try to catch it with a Rainbow Catching Machine.
"Cool Kids"	Ross Hastings
Half-Pint can't join in with Jack, Hot Air and Rodney's Cool Kids Gang and feels left out.
"Daisy's Deputy"	Paul Larson
The Sleeping Policemen are on the Training Day to find something green, red and white. Hot Rodney and the Wild Bunch steal Half-Pint's milk and Half-Pint becomes Daisy's deputy but ends up crashing into the Wobbly Jelly building's whipped cream after chasing Rodney.
"The Ghost of Peekaboo Park"	Paul Larson
Everybody plays hide and seek, but Rodney pushes Jack into the wishing well and Half-Pint thinks there's a ghost of Peekaboo Park.
"Games Day"	Paul Larson
Today is Games Day on Dream Street. Everyone has fun playing all sorts of different games such as I-Spy and Musical Squares.
"Jack the Joker"	Ross Hastings
Jack is playing a bunch of tricks on everyone but cries wolf too often, angering Rodney who traps him under the building blocks.
"Disappearing Domino"	Paul Larson
Jack and Rodney make the domino building disappear by saying Wibbly Wobbly Witches.
"The Big Pink Furry Thing"	Paul Larson
Hot Rodney thinks that he sees a pink furry thing moving.
"Big Mouth, Big Trouble"	Ross Hastings
Jack Hammer has the best voice on Dream Street, but after upsetting Half-Pint and Hot Rodney he gets stuck in the cheese. Meanwhile, Scarlet loses her voice.
"Monster Bunch"	Paul Larson
Hot Air hears a roaring noise like a monster and starts panicking before he gets squashed by the teddy bear clock. It was Jack making that roaring noise.
"The Big Yellow Pipe"	George Tarry
The big crane is lifting the pipes, Jack and Buddy are working hard telling the crane to move and lower. But then, Amber goes missing with the big yellow pipe.
"Topsy Turvy"	Ross Hastings
The Wild Bunch touch the magic dial to the wrong way at the Depot and everything and everyone except Buddy goes topsy turvy.
"Up, Up and Away"	Chris Trengove
The red balloon floats from Rainbow Island to Dream Street and Hot Air wants the balloon to be his friend.
"Christmas Star"	Ian Davis and Stuart Galloway
Everyone enjoys seasonal activities but when The Gossips inform that Father Christmas won't come because no one has any chimneys, everyone feels down. However, Jack has got two crazy ideas up his sleeve.
"Midnight Monstering"	Ross Hastings
Jack Hammer dresses Hot Air up as a monster to scare Half Pint. Buddy teaches him a very valuable lesson.
"Building Block Blunder"	Paul Larson
Buddy and Hot Air are trapped under some building blocks thanks to a naughty trick by Jack and Hot Rodney is the only one who can help them.
"Check Up"	Ross Hastings
The pals decide to have a check-up, but Hot Rodney and Jack Hammer scare everyone by painting spots on Hot Air.
"King for a Day"	Stuart Galloway
When Half Pint the milk float is made King of Dream Street for the day, Hot Rodney is jealous and plans to steal his crown.
"Beep Beep!!"	Ross Hastings
Hot Air, the raspberry-blowing balloon car, takes a shine to Rodney's new air horn because it sounds just like him.
"Mr Fixit"	Paul Larson
Jack Hammer, the bouncing pneumatic drill, decides to fix a few things, but he wreaks havoc and it is up to Buddy the magical truck to put things right.
"Coughs and Sneezes"	Ross Hastings
Hot Rodney pretends to be ill so that everyone will make a fuss of him. But when all his friends really do get sick, Rodney is the only one fit enough to look after them.
"Go Faster Half-Pint"	Paul Larson
Half-Pint tries to be racey and tough and race around as fast as Hot Rodney, but ends up causing an accident. At the end, Daisy told him his do-right duty is to do a safe driving course.
"Hot and Stinky"	Paul Larson
After some milk jugs are spilled Half-Pint puts blocks around them, little does he know they go all stinky and the smell goes around Dream Street.
"The Amazing Bounceroonie"	Ross Hastings
Jack dresses up as the Amazing Bounceroonie and shows everyone his 'magic powers' but what happens when the secrets eventually get revealed?
"Pop Goes The Movies"	Ross Hastings
Dream Street is buried in popcorn when Jack's Whopper Popper Corny Popster goes wrong.
"Dream Street Fun 5000"	Ross Hastings
Rodney wants to win the fun race and together with Jack are determined to get the others out of the race early. But his tricks end up being his undoing when he ends up stinky thanks to the stink bombs.
"Odd One Out"	Stuart Galloway
One of the Wild Bunch gets covered in the red paint, making him look very different.
"Rodney's Party Poop"	Ross Hastings
Hot Rodney is throwing a party, but no one comes to the party.
"Treasure Map"	Ross Hastings
Jack and Buddy find a treasure map under the domino building, find a shawhositwhatsit in the Puppet in the Box and Rodney wears a funny, flowery hat.
"Rumour, Rumour"	Stuart Galloway
The Gossips mishear Daisy saying that she is closing the crossroads for the afternoon and they decide to spread naughty rumours to everyone.
"Beans Means Bounce"	Ross Hastings
Jack sees the jellybeans that the Gossips think they are jumping beans and Jack is sad because his bounce stops working.
"The Giant Sea Shell"	Paul Larson
Tech finds a seashell on the beach but when one of the Wild Bunch gets trapped in the shell, he may be forced to break it.
"Show and Tell"	Ross Hastings
Everybody in Dream Street collects things for Show and Tell.
"Bedtime"	Paul Larson
Jack and Rodney stay up all night for midnight snack and get tired in the morning.
"The Greatest Show on Earth"	Chris Trengove and Paul Larson
Everyone is putting on a circus in Dream Street. Buddy prepares for a big stunt but Rodney interferes and ends up getting stuck on the big dice building.
"Ready Teddy Go"	Ross Hastings
Rodney loses his teddy and throws a tantrum. But Buddy finds his teddy with his Magic Radar.
"Gungey Goo Day"	Paul Larson
Daisy decides to take a day off and Jack and Rodney squirt green goo everywhere with the Gungey Goo Gun.
"Daisy Fights the Flab"	Chris Trengove and Paul Larson
The Sleeping Policemen are too full to catch the Wild Bunch so Daisy teaches them to keep fit and healthy.
"Lollipop, Lollipop"	Paul Larson
When everyone goes on a lollipop hunt, Rodney cheats so that he can keep them all.
"Marshmallow Monster"	Paul Larson
Jack and Rodney eat Ice Cool's marshmallows and Buddy teaches them a lesson by being The Marshmallow Monster.
"When Time Stood Still"	John Gatehouse
Everyone is going to Peakaboo Park for a picnic at 12 'o clock, but Jack sticks the clock's big hand to 12 and small hand to 7 with goo to make the time stand still to avoid fixing the bridge and Rodney comes with him. Everybody thinks it is still 7 o'clock in the afternoon and one of the Wild Bunch gets stuck on the wobbly loose brick!
"The Milk Round Race"	John Gatehouse
Rodney and Half-Pint are having a race, but Half-Pint is too slow and delivers the milk and Rodney gets stuck in the edge of Skipping Rope Bridge. Rodney gets into trouble for telling fibs about Half-Pint being unwell.
"The Talent Show"	Jason Quinn
It's Rodney's birthday and Jack and the Wild Bunch are doing the talent show for Rodney's birthday but Rodney runs away thinking that everyone has forgotten his birthday.
"Genie of the Lamp"	Jason Quinn
Jack dresses up as a genie and makes magic spells on Dream Street.
"Supermilk"	Jason Quinn
Half-Pint becomes a superhero called Supermilk to help out, but ends up getting trapped under the jelly building.
"High Flying Wild Bunch"	Jason Quinn
Jack and the Wild Bunch play on a see-saw to make the Wild Bunch fly up into the air.
"Big Chief Rodney"	Jason Quinn
Jack, Rodney and the Wild Bunch are playing dressing up, Jack becomes Desperate Jack, Rodney becomes Big Chief Rodney and the Wild Bunch are cowboys. They take Half-Pint's milk and squirt gunge on him, tie up PC Snore and then Jack tumbles down the wishing well as they try to escape.
"Hot Air's Floaty Boat"	John Gatehouse
Hot Air wishes that he can fly so Jack Hammer makes a Floaty Boat for him. It isn't long before Hot Air wishes he was back on the ground again.
"Glow For It"	Jason Quinn
On the day of the Dream Street Magic Lights Show, Hot Rodney becomes a police officer but starts getting very bossy and causes the big wheel of Coney Island to go too fast with the Wild Bunch trapped on it.
"Whodunnit?"	Tim Quinn
Jack is not happy, someone keeps messing up his roadworks.
"Buddy's Day"	John Gatehouse
Tech and Daisy plan a special party for Buddy but Jack and Rodney get very jealous and gives Buddy a surprise present. The Wild Bunch open it up and sneezing powder sprays everywhere causing them and the Gossips to sneeze.
"Gold Star Parade"	Tim Quinn
Jack Hammer is fixing a bubble factory pipe, but never finishes and the bubbles appear everywhere on Dream Street.
"Big Book of Magic"	Tim Quinn
It's a very windy day on Dream Street and Rodney finds Tech's Big Book of Magic in Peekaboo Park.

== Development and Broadcast ==
Carlton International greenlit a fifth series in April 2002. By then, the series had been pre-sold by Carlton in over 60 territories.

The series returned to broadcast on the CITV Channel in 2008, with a new intro sequence.

A remastered version with updated effects and CGI elements was announced in 2016. In September 2017, Platinum Films appointed MarVista Entertainment as international distributor for the remaster.

== Merchandise ==
A magazine was published in July 2002, corresponding with the show's "Get Streetwise" road safety campaign.

There have been VHS and DVD releases of the series by Carlton Video. In 2002, FremantleMedia Home Entertainment released a VHS/DVD entitled "Midnight Monstering".
