= Bicknell–Armington Lightning Splitter House =

Historic house in Rhode Island, United States

- U.S. National Register of Historic Places
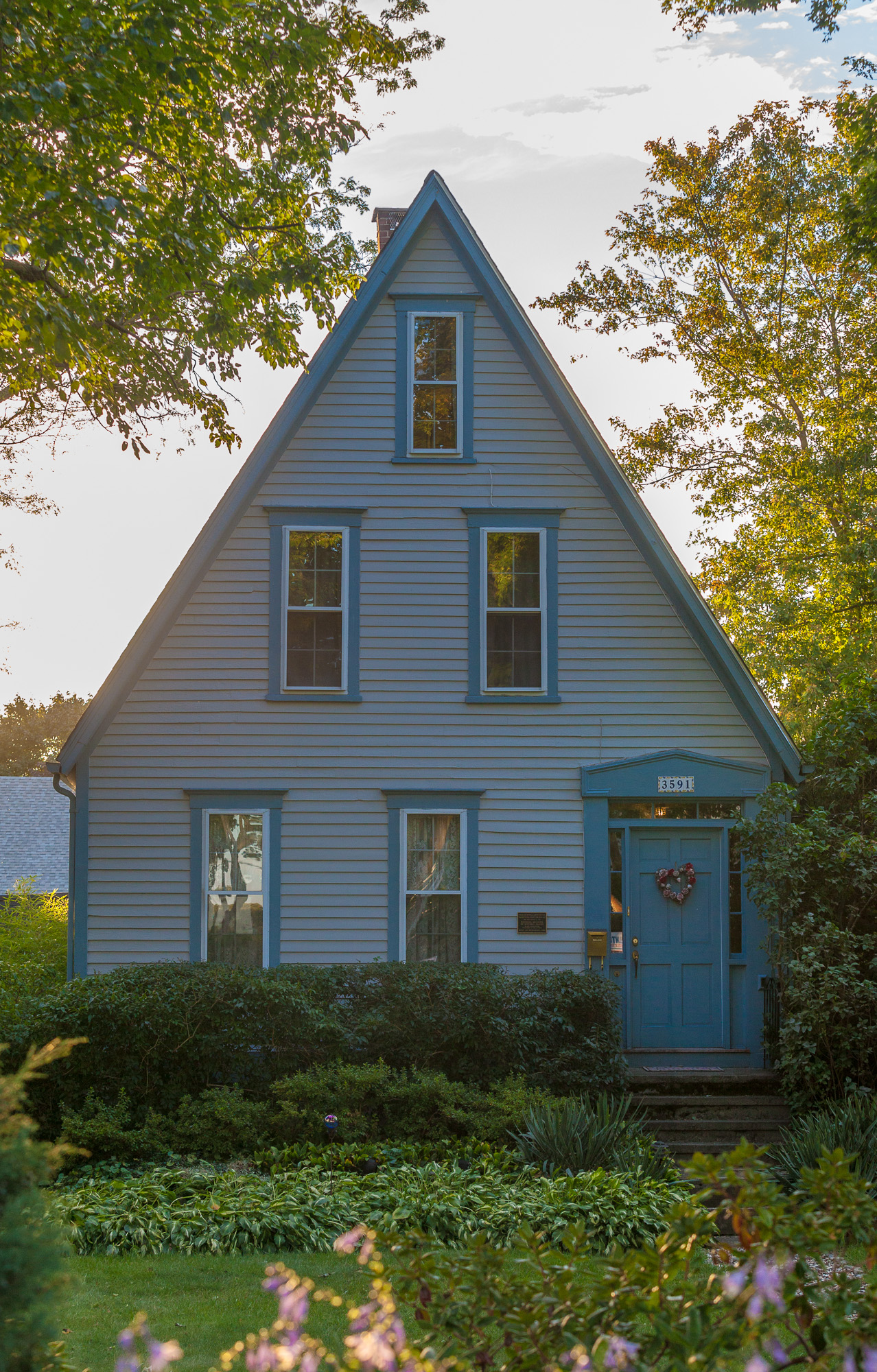

- Location within Rhode Island Location within the United States
- Location: East Providence, Rhode Island
- Coordinates: 41°46′36″N 71°21′43″W
- MPS: East Providence MRA
- NRHP reference No.: 80000085
- Added to NRHP: November 28, 1980

The Bicknell–Armington Lightning Splitter House is a historic house at 3591 Pawtucket Avenue in East Providence, Rhode Island. The house is of a distinctive type, a "Lightning Splitter", of which only a few instances exist in the Providence area. It is a wood-frame structure with a steep two-story gable roof. Records suggest that the house was constructed about 1827, but architectural evidence suggests it was extensively altered in the 1850s. The main entrance and the interior has a simplified Greek Revival styling. The house was listed on the National Register of Historic Places on November 28, 1980.

== Design ==
The date of construction for the house has been billed to both c. 1827 or c. 1850. The City of East Providence Historic District Commission states that the house was built by Pearce Allin as a wedding present for his daughter, Louise. The house is located opposite of Allin's own historic home, better known as Whitcomb Farm. In 1827, Louise married Joseph Bicknell and they would eventually move to Barrington, Rhode Island. They would later pass the property to Dr. Hervey Armington, who married Louisa's sister, Adelia. Thus the provenance of the current name is the names of the first two owners of the home. According to architectural evidence, the house was heavily modified in the 1850s. The house's "Lightning Splitter" design harkens to the superstitious belief that the sharp angled gable would deflect bolts of lightning. The construction or alteration to the steep gable are both possibilities because Providence's surviving examples included new constructions and adaptations dating to the mid-19th century. At the time of the National Register nomination, it was believed that half a dozen examples of the style were still extant in the area in and around Providence.

The house is located on the southwest corner of Pawtucket Avenue and Willett Avenue (Rhode Island Route 103). The house is a wood-framed dwelling resting on a high stone foundation. The house's most prominent and notable feature is its steep two-story gable roof, which is the unique "Lightning Splitter" design. The house has a one-story ell that comes off the basement on the south side and extends beyond the west wall. At the time of its nomination in the 1980s, the house's exterior walls were covered with asbestos shingles, but the original clapboards remained underneath. A simple pilaster-trimmed Greek Revival main doorway is located on northern end of the three-bay front. The second floor of the house has two bays and the third floor has only a single bay. The interior floor plan is divided into three rooms and a small entry hall on the first floor, two rooms on the second floor and two rooms on the third floor. The interior trim was noted to be a highly simplified Greek Revival style.

== Significance ==
The Bicknell–Armington Lightning Splitter House is historically important as a rare example of the unusual design that was rooted in popular folk culture. Additional information on the house, including its ties to Allin were not listed in the National Register of Historic Places nomination serve to further enhance its importance. The house was listed on the National Register of Historic Places on November 28, 1980.

== See also ==
- National Register of Historic Places listings in Providence County, Rhode Island
