= The Gladiators of Rome =

2002 video game

- Developer(s): Cat Daddy Games
- Publisher(s): Activision Value
- Platform(s): Windows
- Release: November 14, 2002
- Genre(s): Action
- Mode(s): Single player, multiplayer

The Gladiators of Rome is a 2002 action strategy game.
