= Lightning splitter =

Style of house in Rhode Island

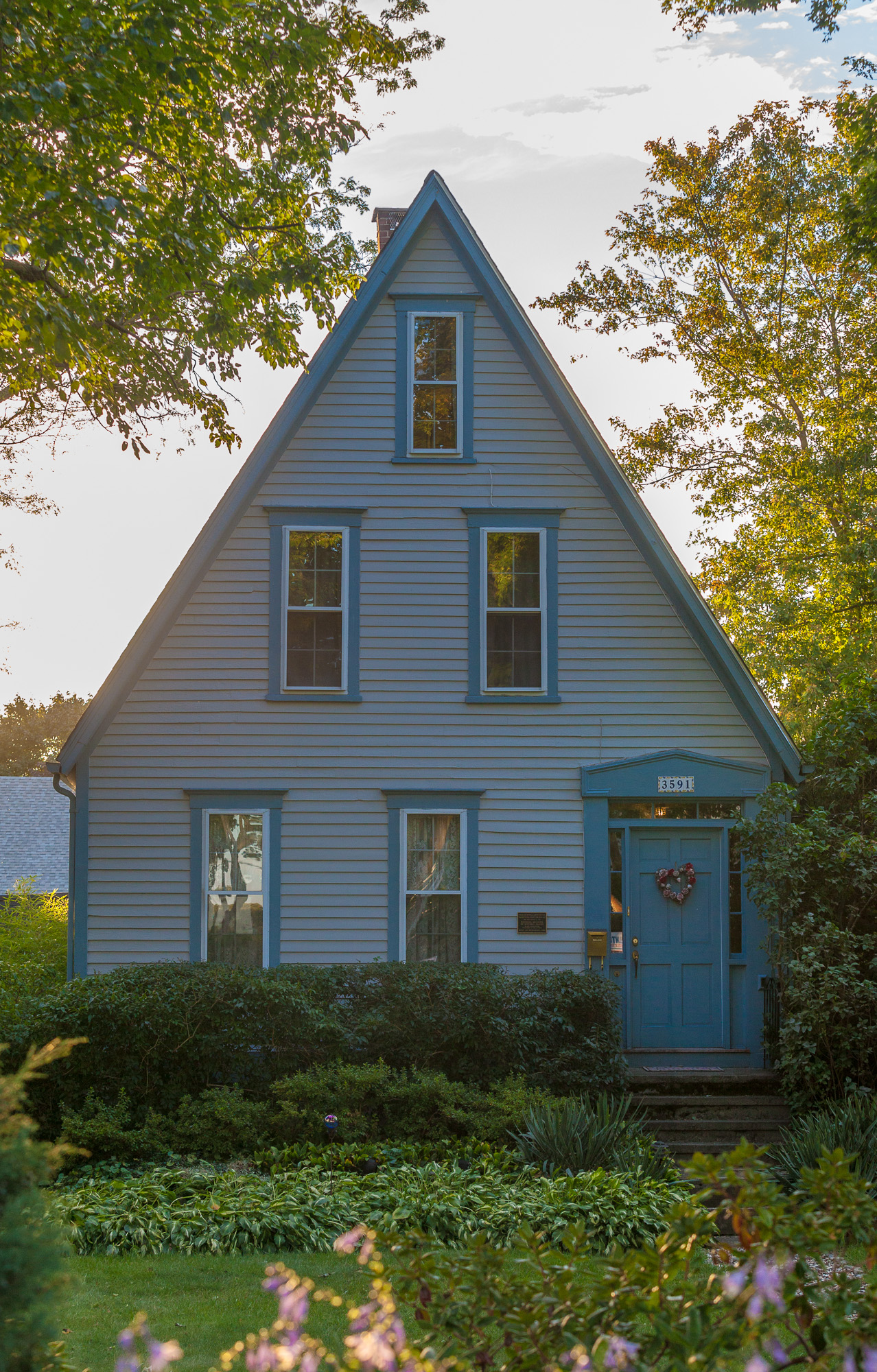
The Bicknell-Armington Lightning Splitter House in East Providence, Rhode Island

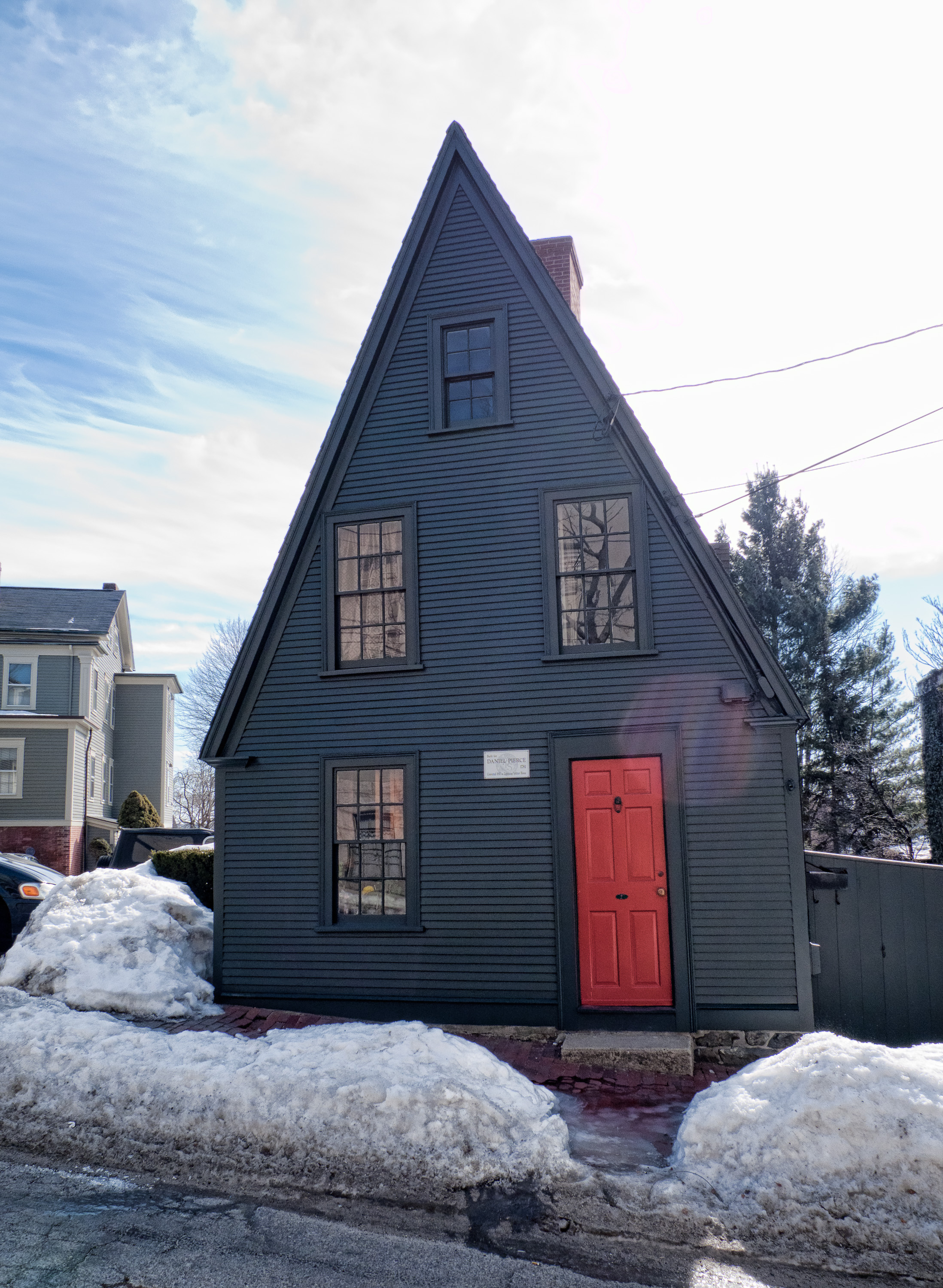
Daniel Pearce House (c1781) at 53 Transit Street in Providence.

A lightning splitter is an architectural design referring to wood-framed homes with sharply angled multi-story gable roof. The sharply angled gable was believed in local Rhode Island folklore to split or deflect bolts of lightning. Architectural evidence suggests that new constructions and modification of existing homes to the style were predominantly in the mid-19th century. By 1980, the number of surviving lightning splitter homes was believed to be about half a dozen.

== Background and design ==
Lightning splitters are named from the folklore or superstitious belief that the sharp angle of the gable will deflect or split lightning. The unique style arose in and around Providence, Rhode Island with the greatest prominence in constructions or modifications occurring in the mid-19th century.

== Surviving examples ==
- The Bicknell–Armington Lightning Splitter House is the only example that is listed on the National Register of Historic Places. Constructed around 1827 and heavily modified around 1850, this house is named for the first two owners of the property.
- The Daniel Pearce (c1755 - 1800) House at 53 Transit Street in Providence is another historic example. Constructed about 1781 and modified to the lightning splitter style circa 1860, the home exhibits a narrower and sharper angle than the Bicknell-Armington House.
- The David Cleveland house built in 1846 located on Halsey Street in the College Hill neighborhood of the East Side of Providence.
- There is also a Lightning Splitter house in Buckland, MA known also as the "Arvid Crittenden House" built in 1900. ScenicByway_Ch5_Franklin-County
