= Horrid Henry =

Book series by Francesca Simon beginning in 1994

- Created by: Francesca Simon
- Original work: Horrid Henry (1994)
- Owners: Orion Publishing Group (publishing); Novel Entertainment (television rights)

Films and television
- Film: Horrid Henry: The Movie
- Television series: Horrid Henry

Official website
- horridhenry.co.uk horridhenry.me

Horrid Henry is a children's book series by Francesca Simon and illustrated by the cartoonist Tony Ross. It has been adapted for television, film and theatre.

== History ==
Following the birth of her son Joshua in 1989, Francesca Simon was asked by Judith Elliott, an editor at Orion Books, to write a story about a horrid child. She also wanted to write about sibling rivalry and families where one child was considered "perfect" and the other "horrid". Inspiration also came from Cain and Abel, Oedipus Rex, Seinfeld, and Simon's own childhood, growing up in California the eldest of four siblings (including her sister Anne), desperately wanting to be an only child. They lived in small houses with confined spaces, with their father Mayo writing upstairs and telling them to be quiet. Simon also stated that she would be perfect and work hard at school, but be horrid and slam doors at home, describing herself as a "mixture of both Henry and Peter". Three more stories were written by Simon at Elliott's request to form a full book.

The first Horrid Henry book was written and published in 1994 by Orion. The books are a slice of life series featuring the titular Henry, a wildly misbehaved boy who will typically be faced with a problem and then will often retaliate in interesting ways that involve trickery, rule-breaking and elaborate practical jokes. Henry has a younger brother, Perfect Peter, who is the exact opposite. Henry despises Peter, whom he refers to as a "worm" or "toad". Almost every character is known by an alliterative nickname (Rude Ralph, Moody Margaret, Brainy Brian, etc.) with a few exceptions e.g. Mum, Dad and Miss Battle-Axe. Many of the books' stories were inspired by events from Simon's life and those of people that she knew, with additional ideas coming from her imagination. Each title in the main series consists of four short stories with black and white illustrations. The titles in the Early Readers series, aimed at younger readers, each consist of a single story with colour illustrations. Each story in that series, except Don't Be Horrid, Henry!, was originally published in a main series title. Don't Be Horrid, Henry! is an original story about Henry as a toddler, illustrated by Kevin McAleenan. Eleven fact books, written from Henry's point of view, have also been published along with eight joke books, eleven colour books and at least twelve activity books as well as a series of annuals. Up until 2015, 24 official Horrid Henry titles were published in the series. The series was published in 31 languages and has sold more than 21 million copies worldwide.

The Horrid Henry stories are read on audiobook by actress Miranda Richardson and published by Orion Audio. Released between 2000 and 2019, the audiobooks were produced by Peter Rinne and Nicholas Jones (for Strathmore Publishing), with music composed by Rinne and Dik Cadbury.

In April 2009, the US Sourcebooks' Jabberwocky imprint released four Horrid Henry paperbacks nationwide, which included Horrid Henry, Horrid Henry's Stinkbomb, Horrid Henry and the Mega-Mean Time Machine and Horrid Henry Tricks the Tooth Fairy. Sourcebooks has released additional Horrid Henry titles including activity pages, event kits and a teacher's guide. In 2019, a special one-off 25th Anniversary book, Horrid Henry: Up, Up and Away, was published.

== Books ==
=== Main series ===
Pre-2019 title	Year of first publication	Current title	Notes
Horrid Henry	1994	Horrid Henry	Series premiere and originally intended to be a single-book
Horrid Henry and the Secret Club	1995	Horrid Henry: Secret Club	
Horrid Henry Tricks the Tooth Fairy	1996	Horrid Henry: Tricking the Tooth Fairy	Originally published as Horrid Henry and the Tooth Fairy
Horrid Henry's Nits	1997	Horrid Henry: Nits Nits Nits!	Also published internationally as Horrid Henry's Head Lice
Horrid Henry Gets Rich Quick	1998	Horrid Henry: Get Rich Quick	Originally published as Horrid Henry Strikes It Rich
Horrid Henry's Haunted House	1999	Horrid Henry: The Haunted House	
Horrid Henry and The Mummy's Curse	2000	Horrid Henry: The Mummy's Curse	
Horrid Henry's Revenge	2001	Horrid Henry: Perfect Revenge	
Horrid Henry and the Bogey Babysitter	2002	Horrid Henry: Bogey Babysitter	
Horrid Henry's Stinkbomb	2002	Horrid Henry: Stinkbombs	
Horrid Henry's Underpants	2003	Horrid Henry: Underpants Panic	
Horrid Henry Meets The Queen	2004	Horrid Henry: The Queen's Visit	
Horrid Henry and the Mega-Mean Time Machine	2005	Horrid Henry: Mega-Mean Time Machine	
Horrid Henry and the Football Fiend	2006	Horrid Henry: Football Fiend	Published internationally as Horrid Henry and the Soccer Fiend
Horrid Henry's Christmas Cracker	2006	Horrid Henry: Christmas Cracker	
Horrid Henry and the Abominable Snowman	2007	Horrid Henry: Abominable Snowman	
Horrid Henry Robs The Bank	2008	Horrid Henry: Bank Robber	
Horrid Henry Wakes The Dead	2009	Horrid Henry: Waking the Dead	
Horrid Henry Rocks!	2010	Horrid Henry: Rock Star	
Horrid Henry and the Zombie Vampire	2011	Horrid Henry: Zombie Vampire	
Horrid Henry's Monster Movie	2012	Horrid Henry: Monster Movie	
Horrid Henry's Nightmare	2013	Horrid Henry: Nightmare	
Horrid Henry's Krazy Ketchup	2014	Horrid Henry: Krazy Ketchup	
Horrid Henry's Cannibal Curse	2015	Horrid Henry: Cannibal Curse	
N/A	2019	Horrid Henry: Up, Up and Away	

=== Extra Book ===
- Horrid Henry's Bedtime (2005; published for World Book Day)

=== Early Readers ===
Title	Year of first publication	Story originally published in	Notes
Don't Be Horrid, Henry!	2000	N/A (original story)	Originally illustrated by Kevin McAleenan. Current illustrations by Tony Ross adopted in 2006.
Horrid Henry's Birthday Party	2009	Horrid Henry: Secret Club	
Horrid Henry's Holiday	2009	Horrid Henry (first book)	
Horrid Henry's Underpants	2009	Horrid Henry: Underpants Panic	
Horrid Henry Gets Rich Quick	2010	Horrid Henry: Get Rich Quick	
Horrid Henry and the Football Fiend	2010	Horrid Henry: Football Fiend	
Horrid Henry's Nits	2010	Horrid Henry: Nits!, Nits!, Nits!	
Horrid Henry and Moody Margaret	2010	Horrid Henry (first book)	
Horrid Henry's Thank You Letter	2011	Horrid Henry: Underpants Panic	
Horrid Henry Reads a Book	2011	Horrid Henry: Stinkbombs	
Horrid Henry's Car Journey	2011	Horrid Henry: Bogey Babysitter	
Moody Margaret's School	2011	Horrid Henry: Bank Robber	
Horrid Henry Tricks and Treats	2011	Horrid Henry: Bogey Babysitter	
Horrid Henry's Christmas Play	2011	Horrid Henry: Christmas Cracker	
Horrid Henry's Rainy Day	2012	Horrid Henry: Abominable Snowman	
Horrid Henry Meets the Queen	2012	Horrid Henry: The Queen's Visit	
Horrid Henry's Sports Day	2012	Horrid Henry: Get Rich Quick	
Horrid Henry's Christmas Presents	2012	Horrid Henry: Christmas Cracker	
Moody Margaret's Makeover	2013	Horrid Henry: Abominable Snowman	
Horrid Henry and the Demon Dinner Lady	2013	Horrid Henry: Perfect Revenge	
Horrid Henry Tricks the Tooth Fairy	2013	Horrid Henry: Tricking the Tooth Fairy	
Horrid Henry's Homework	2013	Horrid Henry: The Mummy's Curse	
Horrid Henry and the Bogey Babysitter	2013	Horrid Henry: Bogey Babysitter	
Horrid Henry's Sleepover	2014	Horrid Henry: Stinkbombs	
Horrid Henry's Wedding	2014	Horrid Henry: Tricking the Tooth Fairy	
Horrid Henry's Haunted House	2014	Horrid Henry: The Haunted House	
Horrid Henry's Christmas Lunch	2014	Horrid Henry: Christmas Cracker	
Horrid Henry's Mother's Day	2015	Horrid Henry: Nightmare	
Horrid Henry and the Comfy Black Chair	2015	Horrid Henry: The Haunted House	
Horrid Henry and the Mummy's Curse	2015	Horrid Henry: The Mummy's Curse	
Horrid Henry and the Abominable Snowman	2015	Horrid Henry: Abominable Snowman	
Horrid Henry and the Mega-Mean Time Machine	2016	Horrid Henry: Mega-Mean Time Machine	
Horrid Henry and the Fangmangler	2016	Horrid Henry: Nits, Nits, Nits	
Horrid Henry's Christmas Ambush	2016	Horrid Henry: Christmas Cracker	
Horrid Henry's Stinkbomb	2016	Horrid Henry: Stinkbombs	
Horrid Henry's Swimming Lesson	2017	Horrid Henry: The Mummy's Curse	
Horrid Henry's Christmas	2017	Horrid Henry: Get Rich Quick	
Horrid Henry's School Fair	2018	Horrid Henry: The Haunted House	
Horrid Henry and the Zombie Vampire	2018	Horrid Henry: Zombie Vampire	
Horrid Henry's Hike	2018	Horrid Henry: Mega-Mean Time Machine	
Horrid Henry's Injection	2019	Horrid Henry: Secret Club	
Horrid Henry's Nightmare	2019	Horrid Henry: Nightmare	
Horrid Henry's Newspaper	2020	Horrid Henry: Bank Robber	

=== Fact books ===
Title	Year of first publication
Horrid Henry's Bodies	2011
Horrid Henry's Dinosaurs	2011
Horrid Henry's Sports	2011
Horrid Henry's Food	2012
Horrid Henry's Bugs	2013
Horrid Henry's Kings and Queens	2013
Horrid Henry's World Records	2013
Horrid Henry's Animals	2014
Horrid Henry's Ghosts	2014
Horrid Henry's Space	2015
Horrid Henry's Crazy Creatures	2015

=== Joke books ===
- Horrid Henry's Joke Book
- Horrid Henry's Jolly Joke Book
- Horrid Henry's Mighty Joke Book
- Horrid Henry's versus Moody Margaret
- Horrid Henry's Hilariously Horrid Joke Book
- Horrid Henry's Purple Hand Gang Joke Book
- Horrid Henry's All Time Favourite Joke Book
- Horrid Henry's Jumbo Joke Book

=== Colour/collection books ===
- Horrid Henry's Big Bad Book
- Horrid Henry's Wicked Ways
- Horrid Henry's Evil Enemies
- Horrid Henry Rules the World
- Horrid Henry's House of Horrors
- Horrid Henry's Dreadful Deeds
- Horrid Henry Shows Who's Boss
- Horrid Henry's A-Z of Everything Horrid
- Horrid Henry's Fearsome Four
- Horrid Henry's Royal Riot
- Horrid Henry's Tricky Tricks
- Horrid Henry: Holiday Horrors (2021)
- Horrid Henry: Rainy Day Disaster (2022)
- Horrid Henry: Party Pandemonium (2023)
- Horrid Henry: Terrible Teachers (2023)
- Horrid Henry: A Yucky Year (2023)
- Horrid Henry: Food Fight (2024)
- Horrid Henry: World's Worst Holiday (2024)
- Horrid Henry: Monster Mayhem (2024)
- Horrid Henry: Fiendish Foes (2025)
- Horrid Henry: Summer of Doom (2025)
- Horrid Henry: Spooks and Scares (2026)

=== Activity books ===
- Horrid Henry's Brainbusters
- Horrid Henry's Headscratchers
- Horrid Henry's Mindbenders
- Horrid Henry's Colouring Book
- Horrid Henry's Puzzle Book
- Horrid Henry's Sticker Book
- Horrid Henry Runs Riot
- Horrid Henry's Annual
- Horrid Henry's Classroom Chaos
- Horrid Henry's Holiday Havoc
- Horrid Henry's Wicked Wordsearches
- Horrid Henry's Mad Mazes
- Horrid Henry's Crazy Crosswords

== Film adaptation ==
On 23 June 2010, Vertigo Films announced that a live action 3-D film of Horrid Henry was in production. The film's plot focuses on Henry and The Purple Hand Gang fighting to prevent the closure of their school by an evil private school Headmaster. The film was released on 29 July 2011 in the United Kingdom and 11 January 2013 in Australia.

== Reception ==
- In April 2008, Horrid Henry and the Abominable Snowman won the Galaxy Children's Book of the Year Award.
- Horrid Henry has twice been nominated for BAFTA's Best Animation; in 2009 and 2010.

== See also ==
- Horrid Henry (TV series)
- Horrible Harry, a different character
