= Suzy Kline =

American writer

- Born: Suzy Weaver; August 27, 1943 (age 82); Berkeley, California
- Occupation: Author
- Years active: 1984 - present
- Notable work: Horrible Harry
- Spouse: Rufus Kline (1968 - present)

Suzy Kline (born 1943 in Berkeley, California) is the author of the Horrible Harry book series as well as the Herbie Jones books.

== Early life and career ==
Kline was born in Berkeley, California, to Harry, a realtor, and Martha Weaver, a substitute teacher. Kline was first inspired to write when she wrote a series of letters to her grandfather. She attended classes at Columbia University during a one-year stay in New York City, and then transferred to the University of California, Berkeley, graduating in 1966 with a BA in history. In 1967 she earned a teaching credential at California State University at Hayward. Kline began teaching at Shannon Elementary School in Richmond, California. She remained there for three years. Over the course of 21 years, Kline wrote and published the entire Herbie Jones series. Kline is also the author of the Horrible Harry series.
