= Horrible Harry =

Children's novel series

Horrible Harry is a children's book series written by Suzy Kline between 1988 and 2019. It is normally used in American elementary schools for teaching reading. It is based on a 2nd (later 3rd) grader named Harry, and his misadventures are told through the words of his best friend, Doug. Harry's and Doug's friends are Sidney, Song Lee, Mary, Ida, and Dexter. His teacher is named Ms. Mackle. His principal is named Mr. Cardini. In addition to the Horrible Harry series, there is a short spin-off book series about Song Lee, also narrated by Doug. As of 2022, there are currently 41 books in the Horrible Harry franchise, including the 4 Song Lee books.

== Horrible Harry characters ==
1. Harry Spooger is the main protagonist of the series. At the end of the last book Horrible Harry Says Goodbye, Harry moves to another town but says goodbye to his friends. Harry likely moves to a new school and continues his "horrible" spark, making new friends. Harry loves being a detective but has a fear of elevators and heights.
2. Doug Hurtuk, the narrator of the series and the secondary protagonist. Doug was one of Harry's classmates before becoming his best friend. After Harry moves away, Doug meets Mohammad and is inspired to write about his adventures with Harry while also continuing to make new friends and keep telling stories with Mohammad.
3. Song Lee Park, Harry's crush and the main protagonist of the Song Lee series. She is best friends with Mary and Ida.
4. Sidney La Fleur is one of the secondary protagonists of Horrible Harry. He is Harry's friendly rival.
5. Mary Berg is one of the secondary protagonists of Horrible Harry. She is one of Song Lee's best friends, along with Ida. Unlike Ida and Song Lee, Mary first doesn't like Harry, but gradually warms up to him.
6. Ida Burrell is one of the secondary protagonists of Horrible Harry. She is one of Song Lee's best friends, along with Mary.
7. Dexter Sanchez is one of the secondary protagonists of Horrible Harry. He is a huge Elvis fan and often says, “Horrible Harry strikes again!”.
8. Ms. Mackle
9. Mr. Cardini

== Horrible Harry titles ==
1. Horrible Harry in Room 2B
2. Horrible Harry and the Green Slime
3. Horrible Harry and the Ant Invasion
4. Horrible Harry's Secret
5. Horrible Harry and the Christmas Surprise
6. Horrible Harry and the Kickball Wedding
7. Horrible Harry and the Dungeon
8. Horrible Harry and the Purple People
9. Horrible Harry and the Drop of Doom
10. Horrible Harry Moves Up to Third Grade
11. Horrible Harry at Halloween
12. Horrible Harry Goes to the Moon
13. Horrible Harry and the Dragon War
14. Horrible Harry and the Holidaze
15. Horrible Harry Goes to Sea
16. Horrible Harry and the Mud Gremlins
17. Horrible Harry and the Locked Closet
18. Horrible Harry and the Goog
19. Horrible Harry Takes the Cake
20. Horrible Harry and the Triple Revenge
21. Horrible Harry Cracks the Code
22. Horrible Harry Bugs the Three Bears
23. Horrible Harry and the Dead Letters
24. Horrible Harry on the Ropes
25. Horrible Harry Goes Cuckoo
26. Horrible Harry and The Secret Treasure
27. Horrible Harry and The June Box
28. Horrible Harry and The Scarlet Scissors
29. Horrible Harry and The Stolen Cookie
30. Horrible Harry and the Missing Diamond
31. Horrible Harry and the Hallway Bully
32. Horrible Harry and the Wedding Spies
33. Horrible Harry and the Top Secret Hideout
34. Horrible Harry and the Birthday Girl
35. Horrible Harry and the Battle of the Bugs
36. Horrible Harry and the Field Day Revenge!
37. Horrible Harry Says Goodbye

== Song Lee Titles ==
1. Song Lee and the Hamster Hunt
2. Song Lee in Room 2B
3. Song Lee and the Leech Man
4. Song Lee and the "I Hate You" Notes
