= Horrid Henry (TV series) =

British animated television series

- Genre: Children's television series Comedy
- Created by: Francesca Simon
- Based on: Horrid Henry by Francesca Simon
- Developed by: Lucinda Whiteley and Mike Watts
- Directed by: Dave Unwin; Franklin J. Griffin and Jake J. Schutz
- Voices of: Lizzie Waterworth-Santo; Emma Tate; Tamsin Heatley; Wayne Forester; Sue Elliott-Nichols; Aidan Cook; Joanna Ruiz
- Opening theme: "Nah Nah Ne Nah Nah" and "I'm Horrid Henry" composed by Lester Barnes and performed by Tim Laws and Matthew Corbett
- Composers: Lester Barnes; Mike Wilkie (Series 1); Matthew and Dave Corbett (Series 1); Tim Laws (31 October 2006 – 23 December 2012)
- Country of origin: United Kingdom
- Original language: English
- No. of series: 5
- No. of episodes: 250 (list of episodes)

Production
- Executive producer: Lucinda Whiteley
- Producer: Mike Watts
- Running time: 11 minutes
- Production company: Novel Entertainment

Original release
- Network: CITV (Series 1–4); Netflix (Series 5) (Note: Reruns of Series 5 aired on Nicktoons UK.)
- Release: 31 October 2006 – 17 September 2020

Horrid Henry is a British animated children's television series based on the British children's book series Horrid Henry by Francesca Simon. The series is produced by British company Novel Entertainment; Canada-based studio Nelvana distributed the program internationally until 2008. It was broadcast from 30 October 2006 to 17 May 2019 on CITV. It is currently available to stream on Netflix in the UK. 250 episodes were produced in total.

== Premise ==
The show tells the story of a 10-year-old boy named Horrid Henry, who enjoys doing naughty and horrid things. He has a 7-year-old younger brother nicknamed Perfect Peter, who happens to be polite and "perfect", the complete opposite of Henry. Henry strongly dislikes Peter and refers to him with insulting nicknames such as a “smelly nappy baby" and "worm". Henry's archenemy is Moody Margaret, his next-door neighbour, and a spoiled brat who always wants her own way. Henry despises her for being a girl and refers to her as "Bogey-Brain".

Other characters in the show include Rude Ralph, Henry's best friend and partner-in-crime; Fang, Henry's pet hamster who communicates with strings of "Yeah-yeah-yeah!"; Miss Battle-Axe, Henry's teacher whom he holds strong contempt for; Sour Susan, Moody Margaret's sidekick who rarely speaks (often mimicking Margaret's words with a mocking tone); Henry's parents, who often ground him for the chaos he causes (the father's first name is Simon, while the mother's remains unknown), Peter's cat Fluffy, Stuck-Up Steve, Henry's snooty, spoiled cousin; Rich Aunt Ruby, Henry's aunt; Prissy Polly, a cousin of Henry's with a squeaky voice; Vomiting Vera, Polly's baby daughter who throws up a lot; Pimpy Paul, Polly's husband and boyfriend; Great-Aunt Greta, an elderly relative of Henry's who believes Henry is a girl; Soggy Sid, Henry's grumpy gym teacher; Miss Oddbod, the headmistress of Ashton Primary School; and Beefy Bert, a classmate of Henry's who only says, "I dunno."

== Episodes ==
Series	Episodes	Originally released	
Series	Episodes	First released	Last released
1	52	30 October 2006	9 October 2007
2	52	16 February 2009	23 December 2012
3	52	22 July 2011	1 September 2012
4	52	11 October 2014	25 October 2015
5	42	17 November 2018	21 May 2019
Specials	2	21 October 2019	17 September 2020

== Characters and cast ==
Character(s)	Voice actor	Ref.
Horrid Henry, (Note: Credited in Horrid Henry's Most Horrible Album.) (Note: Credited in Horrid Henry's Gross Day Out.) Additional Voices	Lizzie Waterworth-Santo	
Perfect Peter, Spotless Sam, Lazy Linda, Miss Oddbod, Madame Tutu, Miss Clutterbuck, Additional Voices	Emma Tate	
Mum, Fang, Fluffy, Tidy Ted, Great-Aunt Greta, Prissy Polly, Vomiting Vera, Ms Tiddler, Tiddles, Burping Belinda, Drusilla Drek, Additional Voices	Tamsin Heatley	
Dad (aka Simon), Aerobic Al, Beefy Bert, Greedy Graham, Pimply Paul, Fred Fartwell, Darius Drek, Additional Voices	Wayne Forester	
Moody Margaret, Mum (episode 49), Anxious Andrew, Weepy William, Greasy Greta (aka Demon Dinner Lady), New Nick, Rich Aunt Ruby, Bogey Barbara, Additional Voices	Sue Elliott-Nichols	
Rude Ralph, Miss Battle-Axe, Brainy Brian, Jolly Josh, Soggy Sid, Tidy Ted (episode 49), Simon Snotful, Dr. Barfington, Additional Voices	Aidan Cook	
Sour Susan, Goody-Goody Gordon, Gorgeous Gurinder, Bossy Bill, Lisping Lily, Miss Lovely, Rabid Rebecca, Singing Soraya, Stuck-Up Steve, Mrs Crunch, Additional Voices	Joanna Ruiz	
DJB	Bella Watts	
Zac Zitface, Damian Drek	Philip Pope	

== Production and development ==
Television rights for the book series were sold for £1 million in 2001. The series was first announced to be in development on 2 October 2003, when Novel Entertainment announced they had secured exclusive TV, film, and home entertainment rights to the franchise from Orion Children's Books. They then announced that a planned animated series was in development, which would feature a new animation style that would bring the books to life. More information was confirmed in March 2004. Novel produced a 1-minute pitch pilot for the series, animated by Peter Dodd and written by Holly Lyons. At Cartoon Forum 2004, 26 episodes were announced to be produced, although no release window was announced at the time. As of 6 December 2005, the animated series was in production. On 17 March 2006, it was announced that the animated series would debut on CITV in late 2006.

The series was produced by Lucinda Whiteley, with Dave Unwin working as animation director. The animation style differs from Tony Ross' illustrations in the books. The animation was mostly done in China, with some additional animation completed in Hungary, with traditionally animated drawings scanned into a computer to be coloured. The incidental music was composed by Lester Barnes, while additional songs were composed by Lockdown Media. The theme songs "Nah Nah Ne Nah Nah" and "I'm Horrid Henry" were performed by Tim Laws and Matthew Corbett, respectively.

In July 2015, Francesca Simon, the author of the book series, revealed that she had never been paid any royalties or income for the show and other Horrid Henry projects produced by Novel, due to Orion not using a lawyer when selling all non-book rights to Novel. She said, "Not understanding the proper value of subsidiary rights was the worst mistake I ever made." In August 2019, Simon stated during a Q&A at the Edinburgh International Book Festival that she did not like the show, due to it differing from the original books.

== Broadcast ==
The second season was commissioned by CITV on 7 May 2008, while the third series was commissioned on 10 February 2011. The fourth series started on 11 October 2014 with another 52 episodes making it 208 in total.

On 10 May 2018, Nicktoons UK announced they had acquired the broadcast rights to all the seasons of the show, and it premiered on 28 May 2018 on Nicktoons in the UK and Ireland with a special "Horrid Half Term". Horrid Henry quickly became the channel's most popular show. On the same day, Novel Entertainment ordered 42 new episodes slated to start airing in 2019. Series 5 took the episode count to 250 in total. In 2019, the series was the number three most-watched animation across all the UK's commercial TV services. CITV lost the rights to the series to Nickelodeon in January 2019, just a few months before the fifth series ended in May that year.

Beginning in 2020, with the successful release of the Horrid Henry's Wild Weekend special, Novel Entertainment announced they would be producing a series of one-hour specials for Netflix, beginning with Horrid Henry's Gross Day Out.

Novel Entertainment has a dedicated page to the in-universe show "Gross Class Zero" on their website, hinting that a spin-off TV series was in the works.

=== International ===
The series was broadcast in more than 90 countries, including France, United States, Germany, South Africa, India, Pakistan, South Korea, Russia, the Philippines and Australia. Nelvana Enterprises originally distributed the series worldwide except in the UK/Ireland and Germany. CITV in the UK, RTÉ in Ireland and ZDF in Germany acquired the rights to the series in the respective countries.

In February 2008, Novel transitioned the show's international distribution to Little Bird Rights. By March, the series was pre-sold to Disney Channel in France, RÚV in Iceland, SVT in Sweden, NRK in Norway and YLE in Finland, with broadcast deals in South Africa, Turkey and Portugal being negotiated. In October 2008, the broadcast rights for the three regions were pre-sold to MNet, Digiturk and RTP respectively, in addition to a Polish deal with Op Art.

In Malta, the series aired on PBS. In the United States, it aired on Starz Kids & Family, and was also available for streaming on Netflix and Amazon Prime Video, it is currently available to watch on The Roku Channel. In the Middle East and North Africa, the series has previously aired on M-Net, as of now, it currently airs on Nicktoons. In 2014, Cartoon Network and Boomerang acquired the series for Australia, New Zealand, Pakistan, India, South-East Asia, South Korea and Taiwan. In the MENA region, it aired on Jeem TV. In 2018, the series premiered in Canada on Toon-A-Vision.

In Wales, the series was dubbed in Welsh and aired on children's block "Stwnsh" on S4C and was titled "Henri Helynt". In Ireland, the series was dubbed into Irish under the title "Dónal Dána" and aired on TG4. In India, the series was later acquired by Sony YAY! and aired on that channel under the title Haste Raho Henry.

== Merchandising ==
On 11 October 2006, Novel appointed the Copyright Promotions Licensing Group as the British and the European licensing agent for the series.

On 19 May 2009, Novel appointed Stella Projects as the licensing agent for the series in Australia and New Zealand.

=== Clothing ===
On 23 July 2007, CPLG appointed Blues Clothing to produce a range a line of nightwear and underwear.

=== Toyline ===
A toyline for the series was announced by CPLG in January 2008 for a Fall release window.

=== Soundtracks ===
On 17 November 2008, Novel Entertainment signed a record deal with EMI to release Horrid Henry's Most Horrible Album, which consisted of new music from the series which would later be featured in Series 2 of the show and was previously featured in the live show Horrid Henry: Live and Horrid!. It was released on 1 December 2008.

In December 2019, the song "Horrid Happy Christmas" was released on Spotify and iTunes.

Horrid Henry's Horrid Album was released on 14 January 2020. New tracks including My Song, Born To Be Rude, Wanna Be Me and Too Cool For School featured on the Vue Cinema special and will be released on the album.

=== Video games ===
On 27 January 2009, CPLG and Novel Entertainment appointed Asylum Entertainment as the show's video game partner. On 1 June 2009, it was announced that SouthPeak Games would co-publish and distribute the game. The game: Horrid Henry: Missions of Mischief, was released for the Nintendo DS and Wii on 4 December 2009. The game was later released on Microsoft Windows, and altogether sold 100,000 units on all three platforms in the UK.

A second game: Horrid Henry's Horrid Adventure was released in November 2010 for the Nintendo DS.

On 25 November 2011, Asylum and Koch Media subsidiary Europress released Horrid Henry: The Good, The Bad and the Bugly for the Nintendo 3DS.

On 21 January 2022, P2 Entertainment released Horrid Henry's Krazy Karts on the Nintendo eShop for Nintendo Switch. A Microsoft Windows port was released on 30 June 2022 on Steam.

=== Apps ===
In December 2010, Novel announced they would release an iOS application based on the series.

== Live show ==
A theatrical stage show titled Horrid Henry: Live and Horrid!, written by John Godber and produced by Watershed Productions and Sheffield Theatres, opened at Lyceum Theatre, Sheffield on 28 August 2008, and ran at the venue until 13 September, after which the show toured the UK at locations such as High Wycombe, Bromley, Newcastle, Hull, Liverpool, and Bradford. The show starred Steven Butler and Steven Tagg as Horrid Henry, Stephen McGill as Horrid Henry Too, Rachael Swift as Moody Margaret and Mum, Alex Tregear as Perfect Peter, Philip Bosworth as Dad, Miss Battle-Axe, Miss Thumper and Ed Banger; Ruth Calkin as Rabid Rebecca, Clark Devlin as Weepy William, Howie McCullough as Aerobic Al, and Katy Porrett as Sour Susan. During Christmas 2008, the show was showcased in London's West End to great fanfare.

In January 2009, it was announced that the show would tour again for the 2009 season due to popular demand during its run. The second run of the show started in Oxford in April before the show travelled to Coventry, Wolverhampton, Nottingham and Cambridge. During the Christmas season that year, the show toured Manchester's Dancehouse.

== Radio series ==
During August and December 2009, Horrid Henry took to the airwaves with his own radio show on the British radio station Fun Kids, hosting a weekly show of comedy and music.

== Awards ==
Year	Award	Category	Recipient(s)	Result	Ref.
2009	British Academy Children's Awards	Best Animation	Lucinda Whiteley, Dave Unwin	Nominated	
2010	British Academy Children's Awards	Best Animation	Lucinda Whiteley, Dave Unwin	Nominated	
2013	British Academy Children's Awards	Kids Vote - Television	Horrid Henry	Nominated	
2016	British Academy Children's Awards	Kids Vote - Television	Horrid Henry	Nominated	
2019	British Academy Children's Awards	Best Performer	Lizzie Waterworth-Santo	Nominated	

== Horrid Henry: Unlocked! ==
During the COVID-19 lockdowns a podcast entitled Horrid Henry: Unlocked! was released on Spotify and iTunes, presented by Lizzie Waterworth (as herself and Henry), and children's radio presenter "Silly" Sean Thorne. The series featured a variety of fun and games, as well as short stories narrated by the title character.

=== Episodes ===
- 26 April 2020 - Not So Fun Run!
- 3 May 2020 - Name Game!
- 10 May 2020 - The Lost Dog!
- 17 May 2020 - The Time Capsule!
- 24 May 2020 - Sleepover!
- 31 May 2020 - Favourite Day!
- 7 June 2020 - The Big Dig!
- 14 June 2020 - Champion Chef!
- 21 June 2020 - Gone Fishing!
- 28 June 2020 - Perfect Peter, Popstar!
- 5 July 2020 - Pet Sitting Mayhem!
- 12 July 2020 - Smelly Stuff!

== See also ==
- Horrid Henry: The Movie
- Horrid Henry
