= Liz May Brice =

English actress

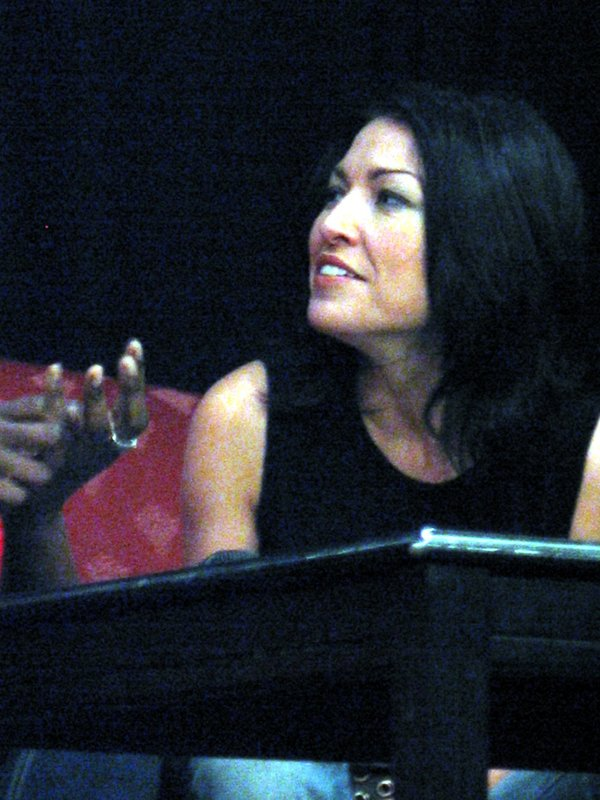
- Born: Elizabeth May Brice; 8 September 1975 (age 51); Redhill, Surrey, England
- Other name: Lisa Brice
- Years active: 1985–present

Elizabeth May Brice (born 8 September 1975) is an English actress. She is known for roles such as the convicted murderess Pat Kerrigan on ITV's Bad Girls, and Agent Johnson in Torchwood: Children of Earth.

== Career ==
Brice was born in Redhill, Surrey. She studied English at the University of Cambridge. Her early acting roles included a schoolgirl witch in the 1986 adaptation of Jill Murphy's novel The Worst Witch and a part in children's sitcom News at Twelve (1988) (for both these roles she was credited as "Lisa" Brice). She joined the cast of prison drama Bad Girls in Series 7, in 2005 as Pat Kerrigan, who is serving life in prison for the murder of her ex-boyfriend. Her character would become the final "Top Dog" of the show.

Brice has appeared in episodes of BBC's Hustle and played the role of Medic in the film version of Resident Evil. She had a cameo in another horror film, AVP: Alien vs Predator. Her CV also includes the film sequel Fortress 2 with Christopher Lambert and the US mini-series The 10th Kingdom. Brice also appeared in the popular Channel 4 sitcom Peep Show in 2007. In the same year, she played the role of Susannah bat Jonah in Roman Mysteries, the CBBC drama based on The Roman Mysteries books by Caroline Lawrence, alongside Nicholas Farrell, with whom she would later work in Torchwood's Children of Earth. In 2008 she played the role of Herrena in the TV adaptation of Terry Pratchett's The Colour of Magic.

She has also starred in her former partner Charlie Brooker's zombie horror Dead Set, and appears as Government assassin Agent Johnson in Torchwood's Children of Earth, aired in July 2009. She has also starred in The Bill as counter-terrorism officer Karen Lacy.

In April 2010 she appeared in the episode "Loves Me, Loves Me Not" of BBC serial drama Casualty, playing the part of Lyn (mother of two of the child patients). She becomes involved with Dr Adam Trueman when he realises she is a single mother.

In the 2012 crime thriller movie Hard Boiled Sweets, Brice portrayed the role of Jenna.

In 2013, Brice played a character called Tara – the new love interest for Billy Mitchell (Perry Fenwick) – in the soap opera EastEnders. She appeared in the soap from 26 to 30 August. Brice's character also made a rival out of the local B&B owner Kim Fox (Tameka Empson). She then appeared as Tina in Misfits.

In 2014, Brice voiced Licia of Lindeldt & Milibeth in Dark Souls II, and later portrayed Gainsborough in the Black Mirror holiday special titled "White Christmas".

== Filmography ==
Film
Year	Title	Role	Director
2000	Fortress 2: Re-Entry	Elena Rivera	Geoff Murphy
2001	The Last Minute	Sally	Stephen Norrington
2002	Resident Evil	Medic	Paul W. S. Anderson
2002	The Princess and the Pea	Hildegard (voice)	Mark Swan
2004	AVP: Alien vs. Predator	Supervisor	Paul W. S. Anderson
2012	Hard Boiled Sweets	Jenna	David L.G. Hughes
2016	Monochrome	Martha Walker	Thomas Lawes
2019	Amaryllis	Jennifer	Thomas Lawes

Television
Year	Title	Role	Notes
1985	Coming Through	Elsa Weekley	TV movie
1986	The Worst Witch	Zoe Chant-Vestry	TV movie
1988	News at Twelve	Tina Swindley	Series 1 (main; all 6 episodes)
1991	Chalkface	Claire	Series 1 (guest; 1 episode)
1997	The Student Prince	Director	TV movie
1998	The Stalker's Apprentice	Heather Brazier-Young	TV movie
1999	A Touch of Frost	PC Clarke	Series 6 (guest; 1 episode)
1999	Comedy Lab	Sarah	Series 2 (guest; 1 episode)
2000	The 10th Kingdom	Mary Ramley	Miniseries (recurring; 3 episodes)
2000	In Defence	PC Sally Higson	Miniseries (guest; 1 episode)
2000	Holby City	Michelle Kash	Series 3 (guest; 1 episode)
2001	Urban Gothic	Stamp	Series 2 (guest; 1 episode)
2002	Stan the Man	Kelly	Series 1 (guest; 1 episode)
2003	Trust	Gabriella Emmanuelle	Miniseries (guest; 1 episode)
2003	Murder in Mind	Mel	Series 3 (guest; 1 episode)
2003	The Bill	Trish Holloway	Series 19 (guest; 1 episode)
2004–2005	Hustle	DC Terri Hodges	Series 1–2 (recurring; 2 episodes)
2004	NY-LON	Karen	Miniseries (guest; 1 episode)
2004	The Bill	Kirsty Brennan	Series 20 (recurring; 2 episodes)
2005	Casualty	Pam Dunbar	Series 19 (guest; series 1)
2005–2006	Bad Girls	Pat Kerrigan	Series 7–8 (main; 19 episodes)
2005	The Robinsons	Judy	Series 1 (guest; 1 episode)
2007	Peep Show	Sally Slater	Series 4 (guest; 1 episode)
2007	Roman Mysteries	Susannah	Series 1 (recurring; 4 episodes)
2007	The Whistleblowers	Zoe Taylor	Series 1 (guest; 1 episode)
2008	Terry Pratchett's The Colour of Magic	Herrena	TV movie
2008	Casualty	Elissa Holt	Series 22 (guest; 1 episode)
2008	The Bill	DI Karen Lacey	Series 24 (recurring; 4 episodes)
2008	Dead Set	Alex Bryson	Miniseries (recurring;episodes 2,3&4)
2009	Torchwood: Children of Earth	Johnson	Main; 5 episodes
2010	Casualty	Lyn Marshall	Series 24 (recurring; 4 episodes)
2011	How TV Ruined Your Life	Various	Miniseries (recurring; 3 episodes)
2013	Casualty	Rachel Farley	Series 27 (guest; 1 episode)
2013	EastEnders	Tara	Soap opera (recurring; 4 episodes)
2013	Misfits	Tina	Series 5 (guest; 1 episode)
2014	Moving On	Claire Jackson	Series 6 (guest; 1 episode)
2014	Black Mirror	Gainsborough	Christmas special (guest)
2016	Drifters	Tracey	Series 4 (guest; 1 episode)
2017	Doctors	Angelica Botham-Hart	Soap opera, Series 19 (recurring; 2 episodes)
2018	Bad Move	News Reader	Series 2 (guest; 1 episode)
2019	Sanditon	Mrs. Harries	Series 1 (guest; 1 episode)
2020	Casualty	Josie Alain	Series 34 (guest; 1 episode)
