= Olivia Hetreed =

British screenwriter and editor

- Born: 1961 (age 64–65)
- Occupations: Screenwriter, editor
- Spouse: Andy Paterson
- Writing career
- Language: English
- Notable works: Girl with a Pearl Earring (film); Wuthering Heights (2011 film)
- Notable awards: Nominated for BAFTA Award for Best Adapted Screenplay

Olivia Hetreed is a British screenwriter and editor, and the former president of the Writers' Guild of Great Britain. In 2003, she received a BAFTA nomination for Best Adapted Screenplay for adapting Tracy Chevalier's best-selling novel Girl with a Pearl Earring into the film of the same name.

== Early life ==
Olivia Hetreed studied English at university. She first worked as an editor of documentaries and films. Later, she began her writing career by working on family films such as The Treasure Seekers (1996) and The Canterville Ghost (1996).

== Career ==
In 1998, she wrote the short film Candy, but found wider fame when she adapted Girl with a Pearl Earring into the 2003 film of the same name. Hetreed had gained access to the novel shortly before its publication, as she and Chevalier shared the same agent. Her husband Andy Paterson convinced the author to sell the film rights, and he co-produced the film with his production company Archer Films. For her work in the film, she received a BAFTA nomination for Best Adapted Screenplay.

Later in 2003, Hetreed wrote an adaptation of Geoffrey Chaucer's story "The Man of Law's Tale" from his work The Canterbury Tales, for the miniseries of the same name. Hetreed's contribution to the series starred Andrew Lincoln and Nikki Amuka-Bird, with direction overseen by Julian Jarrold. The children's television series Roman Mysteries was Hetreed's next project, which she adapted from Caroline Lawrence's work in 2006. In 2011, she co-wrote Wuthering Heights with Andrea Arnold, an adaptation of the novel of the same name by Emily Brontë. As a result of these writing credits, she has been called an "expert in literary adaptations."

In 2013, Hetreed was named the new president of the Writers' Guild of Great Britain. She announced, "Most of the Guild's efforts remain unseen and unknown to members or the outside world. My focus as President will be to make the work of the Guild and its members more visible, both internally and externally."

In 2016, Hetreed co-wrote the Spanish historical drama Altamira, directed by Hugh Hudson, and in 2017, ventured into animation for the children's film Birds Like Us, the first Bosnian full-length computer animated film. She was one of several writers on Mrs. Harris Goes to Paris for Anthony Fabian.

Hetreed, together with Keith Thompson, Carroll Cartwright, and Anthony Fabian won best feature adaption for their work on Mrs. Harris Goes to Paris at the AWGIE Awards 2022.
