= Girl with a Pearl Earring (disambiguation) =

Girl with a Pearl Earring is a painting by Johannes Vermeer.

Girl With a Pearl Earring may also refer to:

- Girl with a Pearl Earring (novel), by Tracy Chevalier
- Girl with a Pearl Earring (film)
  - Girl with a Pearl Earring (soundtrack), from the film
- Girl with a Pearl Earring (play)
