= Valerius Flaccus (poet) =

1st-century Roman poet and writer

Gaius Valerius Flaccus (/ˈflækəs/; died c. AD 90) was a 1st-century Roman poet who flourished during the "Silver Age" under the Flavian dynasty, and wrote a Latin Argonautica that owes a great deal to Apollonius of Rhodes' more famous epic.

== Life ==
The only widely accepted mention of Valerius Flaccus by his contemporaries is by Quintilian (10.1.90), who laments the recent death of "Valerius Flaccus" as a great loss; as Quintilian's work was finished about 90 AD, this traditionally gives a limit for the death of Valerius Flaccus. Recent scholarship, however, puts forward an alternative date of about 95 AD, and definitely before the death of Domitian in 96 AD.

It has been claimed that he was a member of the College of Fifteen, who had charge of the Sibylline books, based on a reference in his work to the presence of a tripod in a "pure home" (1.5). The assumption that this indicates he himself was a member, however, has also been contested.

A contested mention of a poet of the name "Valerius Flaccus" is by Martial (1.76), who refers to a native of Padua. A subscription in the Vatican Library manuscript adds the name Setinus Balbus, a name which suggests that its holder was a native of Setia in Latium, however it is not clear if this inscription refers to "Valerius Flaccus" or someone else. The connection of this "Valerius Flaccus" to Gaius Valerius Flaccus has been contested under the assumption that Martial was referring to his friend's financial strife, and that Gaius Valerius Flaccus was a member of the College of Fifteen, and therefore likely to have been wealthy.

== Argonautica ==
Valerius Flaccus' only surviving work, the Argonautica, was dedicated to Vespasian on his setting out for Britain. It was written during the siege, or shortly after the capture of Jerusalem by Titus in 70 AD. As the eruption of Vesuvius in 79 AD is alluded to, its composition must have occupied him a long time. The Argonautica is an epic poem probably intended to be in eight books (though intended totals of ten and twelve books, the latter corresponding to Virgil's Aeneid, an important poetic model, have also been proposed) written in traditional dactylic hexameters, which recounts Jason's quest for the Golden Fleece.

The Argonautica was lost until 1411, when the first 4½ volumes were found at St Gall in 1417 and published at Bologna in 1474.

The poem's text, as it has survived, is in a very corrupt state; it ends so abruptly with the request of Medea to accompany Jason on his homeward voyage, that it is assumed by most modern scholars that it was never finished. It is a free imitation and in parts a translation of the Argonautica of Apollonius of Rhodes, "to whom he is superior in arrangement, vividness, and description of character" (Loeb Classical Library). The familiar subject had already been treated in Latin verse in the popular version of Varro Atacinus. The object of the work has been described as the glorification of Vespasian's achievements in securing Roman rule in Britain and opening up the ocean to navigation (as the Euxine was opened up by the Argo).

In 1911, the compilers of the Encyclopædia Britannica remarked,

Various estimates have been formed of the genius of Valerius Flaccus, and some critics have ranked him above his original, to whom he certainly is superior in liveliness of description and delineation of character. His diction is pure, his style correct, his versification smooth though monotonous. On the other hand, he is wholly without originality, and his poetry, though free from glaring defects, is artificial and elaborately dull. His model in language was Virgil, to whom he is far inferior in taste and lucidity. His tiresome display of learning, rhetorical exaggeration and ornamentations make him difficult to read, which no doubt accounts for his unpopularity in ancient times.

More modern analysis has been more accepting of Valerius Flaccus' style, noting how it fits in the "long and energetic Roman tradition of appropriation of the golden age and iron age myths" and commenting on his narrative technique:

Valerius has unjustly suffered from being viewed as a doggedly earnest imitator of mightier models; his self-awareness and wry humour have gone largely unnoticed, although he has been commended for the poise of his versification and the acuity of his observation.

== Editions ==
Older editions

- Editio princeps, Bologna 1474
- Giovanni Battista Pio, Bologna 1519 (with commentary and continuation of the poem: remainder of book 8, book 9, and book 10)
- Aldine edition, Venice 1523
- Louis Carrion, Antwerp 1565 (2nd ed. 1566) (Plantin edition)
- Nicolaas Heinius, Leiden 1680 (2nd ed. Utrecht 1702 [by Pieter Burman], 3rd ed. Padua 1720 [by Giuseppe Comino]
- Pieter Burman, Leiden 1724 (variorum edition)
- Bipontine edition, Zweibrücken 1786
- J.A. Wagner, Göttingen 1805 (with commentary)

Modern editions

- G. Thilo, Halle 1863
- C. Schenkl, Berlin 1871
- E. Baehrens, Leipzig 1875 (Bibliotheca Teubneriana)
- P. Langen, Berlin 1896-7
- J.B. Bury, London 1900 (in Postgate's Corpus Poetarum Latinorum)
- C. Giarratano, Palermo 1904
- O. Kramer, Leipzig 1913 (Bibliotheca Teubneriana)
- J.H. Mozley, London & Cambridge, MA, 1934 (Loeb Classical Library)
- E. Courtney, Leipzig 1970 (Bibliotheca Teubneriana)
- W.W. Ehlers, Stuttgart 1980 (Bibliotheca Teubneriana)
- G. Liberman, Paris 1997 (Collection Budé) – Books 1–4
- F. Caviglia, Milan 1999 (Biblioteca Universale Rizzoli [BUR])
- G. Liberman, Paris 2002 (Collection Budé) – Books 5–8

English translations

- J.H. Mozley, London & Cambridge, MA, 1934 (Loeb Classical Library)
- D.R. Slavitt, Baltimore 1999
- Michael Barich, Gambier, OH 2009

== In popular culture ==
Valerius Flaccus appears as a recurring character in Caroline Lawrence's 21st-century Roman Mysteries series of children's novels. He is the husband of the main character, Flavia Gemina. In the television adaptations, the character is played by British actor Ben Lloyd-Hughes.
