= Keith Littler =

Author and television producer (born 1961)

- Born: Keith Reginald Littler; 26 March 1961 (age 65); Ely, Cambridgeshire, England
- Occupations: Producer, Television writer, Author
- Notable credit(s): Little Red Tractor, The Roman Mysteries, The Bopps, Bottom Knocker Street

Keith Reginald Littler (born 26 March 1961) is an English author, writer, composer and producer best known for his work on several children's programmes.

== Bottom Knocker Street ==
Keith Littler, director and founder of Fubuloo Ltd, produced, directed and was lead writer/script editor on 52 X 11mins of Bottom Knocker Street for ITV Southampton (first TX Aug 2013).

The series, based upon an original concept by Paul Galloway and Richard Watson, stars Phill Jupitus and follows the adventures of four children who face random and improbable hurdles in their quest to build a city farm.

Littler also composed and performed the music for the series.

== The Little Entertainment Group Ltd. ==
Littler was also a director of The Little Entertainment Group, which evolved from a post-production company into a full-time television production he formed in 1988. Littler’s company produced several internationally successful TV shows including Little Red Tractor, Merlin the Magical Puppy, Little Monsters, Roman Mysteries, and Billy among others.

Littler is a published author of several children’s books relating to his TV series.

In 2007, Littler founded the children’s music group The Bopps and went on to develop and appear in the TV series with Stan Cullimore, Michael Cross and Joanna Ruiz for Nickelodeon UK.

Littler formed his TV production company in 1988 after ten years of playing in musical bands and football commentating on local radio with Severn Sound.

His passion for motor-sport resulted in him producing and presenting for Sky Sports the Legends Cars Championship.

LEG's post-production dubbing and recording studio subsidiary, Little Entertainment Post (formerly Ten Pin Alley until December 2007, and later Fubuloo Ltd. and then The Little Music Company) has worked on many British English dubs of preschool shows imported from the USA and Canada, such as Finley the Fire Engine, Pinky Dinky Doo, ToddWorld, Diver Dan (as Deep Sea Dick), Clifford the Big Red Dog, The Backyardigans, LazyTown, Ni Hao, Kai-Lan (Series 1 only), and many more.

== Other works ==
Littler has also worked as a sound designer on The Adventures of Dawdle the Donkey (as well as composing the background music) (ITV) and Casper and Friends (TCC), a music composer on Little Monsters (BBC) and a voice director on Watership Down (ITV). Keith Littler also produces and presents the 'YouTube' internet monthly magazine 'Table Football Monthly' focussing on all types of table football - as highlighted in the title - with 'Subbuteo Table Soccer' the magazine's main focus.
