= Girl with a Pearl Earring (soundtrack) =

Girl with a Pearl Earring: Original Motion Picture Soundtrack

Soundtrack album by Alexandre Desplat
- Released: 10 February 2004
- Recorded: 19–23 July 2003
- Studio: Sony Studios (London)
- Length: 50:31
- Label: Decca
- Producers: Anna Champeau; Andy Paterson

Alexandre Desplat chronology
Inquiétudes (2003)	Girl with a Pearl Earring: Original Motion Picture Soundtrack (2004)	Birth (2004)

Girl with a Pearl Earring: Original Motion Picture Soundtrack is the soundtrack album to the 2003 film Girl with a Pearl Earring starring Scarlett Johansson, Colin Firth, Tom Wilkinson, Cillian Murphy and Judy Parfitt. It was composed by French film composer Alexandre Desplat.

Desplat was a veteran of primarily French films since the early 1990s. His work for Girl with a Pearl Earring raised his international profile as his breakout score in Hollywood; it led to a prominent career composing major films like The King's Speech (2010) and The Grand Budapest Hotel (2014). The soundtrack received nominations for the Golden Globe Award for Best Original Score and the BAFTA Award for Best Film Music.

== Development and composition ==
"Period music can be a trap. That's the one advantage to being the last person to see the completed film, as usually I am. I see with fresh eyes what's already there on the screen and I take its pulse. So if a film is set in the Netherlands in the seventeenth century I can see how far the costumes and production design and the dialogue already tell the audience that".
– Alexandre Desplat

The musical score to the film Girl with a Pearl Earring was written by the French composer Alexandre Desplat. Desplat had to work quickly when composing his score, and sought to avoid creating "a period, baroque score", as he felt that genre could "be a trap". According to Desplat, the film's director Peter Webber wished to avoid making a period film, believing the story was timeless. Desplat thought the use of choirs and baroque-like instrumentations "seemed too obvious" for the film. To Desplat, the film's story depicted the repression felt between the two main characters. "The music had to reflect that, so it couldn't be too busy", Desplat said.

Recording his score at Abbey Road, Desplat employed a large string orchestra with piano, woodwinds, celeste, and brass instruments. In his entry for The Encyclopedia of Film Composers, Thomas Hischak felt the score exhibits Desplat's "classical side", for a composer known to employ many different musical influences in his work. Danny Graydon of the film magazine Empire notes a central theme which "dominates the score, appearing in a variety of instrumental forms, including solo piano and violin. Elsewhere, Desplat creates a captivating atmosphere of cautious emotion and wonderment, the true highlight being 'Colour In The Clouds', so simply majestic that it really captures the heart of the story".

== Release and reception ==
Professional ratings
Review scores
Source	Rating
Empire	4/5 stars

Girl with a Pearl Earring was Deplat's breakout score in Hollywood, despite it being his 50th production as composer. Desplat had contributed musical scores to primarily French films since the early 1990s but his score for Girl with a Pearl Earring raised his international profile, leading to a prominent career composing major films such as The King's Speech (2010), Godzilla (2014), and The Grand Budapest Hotel (2014). The album was nominated for the Golden Globe Award for Best Original Score and the BAFTA Award for Best Film Music.

In a 2004 interview, the film's director, Peter Webber commented that Desplat "has done a fantastic job. He's quite rightly been nominated for a Golden Globe. Music is a difficult trick to pull off, because the wrong score could have dragged this film down. Alexander [sic] did the opposite". Writing for The New York Times, Elvis Mitchell described the score as "gorgeous" which "brushes in a haunted gloom that gives the picture life where none seems to exist". Danny Graydon from Empire called the score "a supremely elegant work that should gain him much-deserved attention on the international stage".

== Track listing ==
All music is composed by Alexandre Desplat.

No.	Title	Length
1.	"Girl with a Pearl Earring"	2:18
2.	"Griet's Theme"	4:07
3.	"A New Life"	3:06
4.	"Master's House"	3:16
5.	"Camera Obscura"	1:33
6.	"The Birth Feast"	2:46
7.	"Cornelia"	1:43
8.	"Vermeer's Studio"	3:09
9.	"Winter Nights"	2:08
10.	"Van Ruijven"	3:32
11.	"Home"	1:15
12.	"Colours in the Clouds"	3:28
13.	"The Master Is Painting"	2:07
14.	"By the Canal with Pieter"	1:46
15.	"Catharina's Pearls"	1:23
16.	"Colours in the Clouds" (strings)	3:27
17.	"Girl with a Pearl Earring" (reprise)	2:19
18.	"Silence and Light" (piano solo)	1:40
19.	"Griet's Theme" (reprise)	4:19
20.	"Griet Remembers"	1:09
