= The Bopps =

UK musical group

- Origin: England
- Genre: Children's music
- Years active: 2010 - Present
- Label: Luck Pepper
- Members: Stan Cullimore; Keith Littler; Helena Dowling
- Past members: Joanna Ruiz; Mike Cross
- Website: http://www.thebopps.co.uk

The Bopps are a children's musical group formed in the south west of England in 2010. Their members are Stan Cullimore, Keith Littler, Mike Cross and Joanna Ruiz.

== Formation ==
Stan Cullimore was previously a member of the pop band The Housemartins who were popular during the 1980s. Other members of The Housemartins include Norman Cook otherwise known as Fatboy Slim and Paul Heaton who went on to form The Beautiful South. Since then Stan Cullimore has been involved in the production of children's television and music for such clients as Nickelodeon, CBeebies and CITV.

Keith Littler has run a successful pre-school television production company - The Little Entertainment Group for many years. Amongst his works are Little Red Tractor which is broadcast in the UK by BBC, TV drama Roman Mysteries BBC and Merlin the Magical Puppy (cITV).

== The tale of The Bopps ==
From The Bopps Website

The Bopps love to play their songs to children but had soon played to all of the local playgroups and schools. They needed to think of a way to find more children to play their music to.

Mike Bopp invented The Gloombuster. This special machine allows The Bopps to talk with children everywhere who like to listen and dance to music. Soon The Bopps were travelling all over the country making new friends and inviting everyone to become a Bopper. Over time their special tree house grew and grew until there was a large and comfortable den. Wooden steps inside the trunk of the tree take you to the Gloombuster. Below the Gloombuster is a recording studio and then, at the very bottom of the tree is Mike Bopp’s inventing room and a door to the outside world……which is very well hidden.

== Television series ==
The Bopps first went on air in the United Kingdom on 5 April 2010 on the children's channel Nick Jr.

== Discography ==
=== Albums ===
- The Bopps - The Bopping Tunes from the TV Series (2010)

=== Singles ===
"The Bopps Theme", "Best Friend", "Numbers", "Toy Box", "Park", "Dance", "Hoppity Hop", "Noisy Nigel", "Jelly Shoes", "Sunshine" and "Ghost Song" (December 2010)
