= Harry Stott =

British stage and television actor

- Born: 30 September 1995 (age 30); Oxfordshire, UK
- Occupations: Stage and television actor, journalist

Harry Stott (born 30 September 1995), from Henley-on-Thames, Oxfordshire, is a British stage and television actor and a journalist. As a child he starred in the West End production of Mary Poppins, and later as the lead role in Sir Cameron Mackintosh's Oliver!. He also had television roles, most notably as the character of Lupus in the BBC's Roman Mysteries.

== Acting career ==
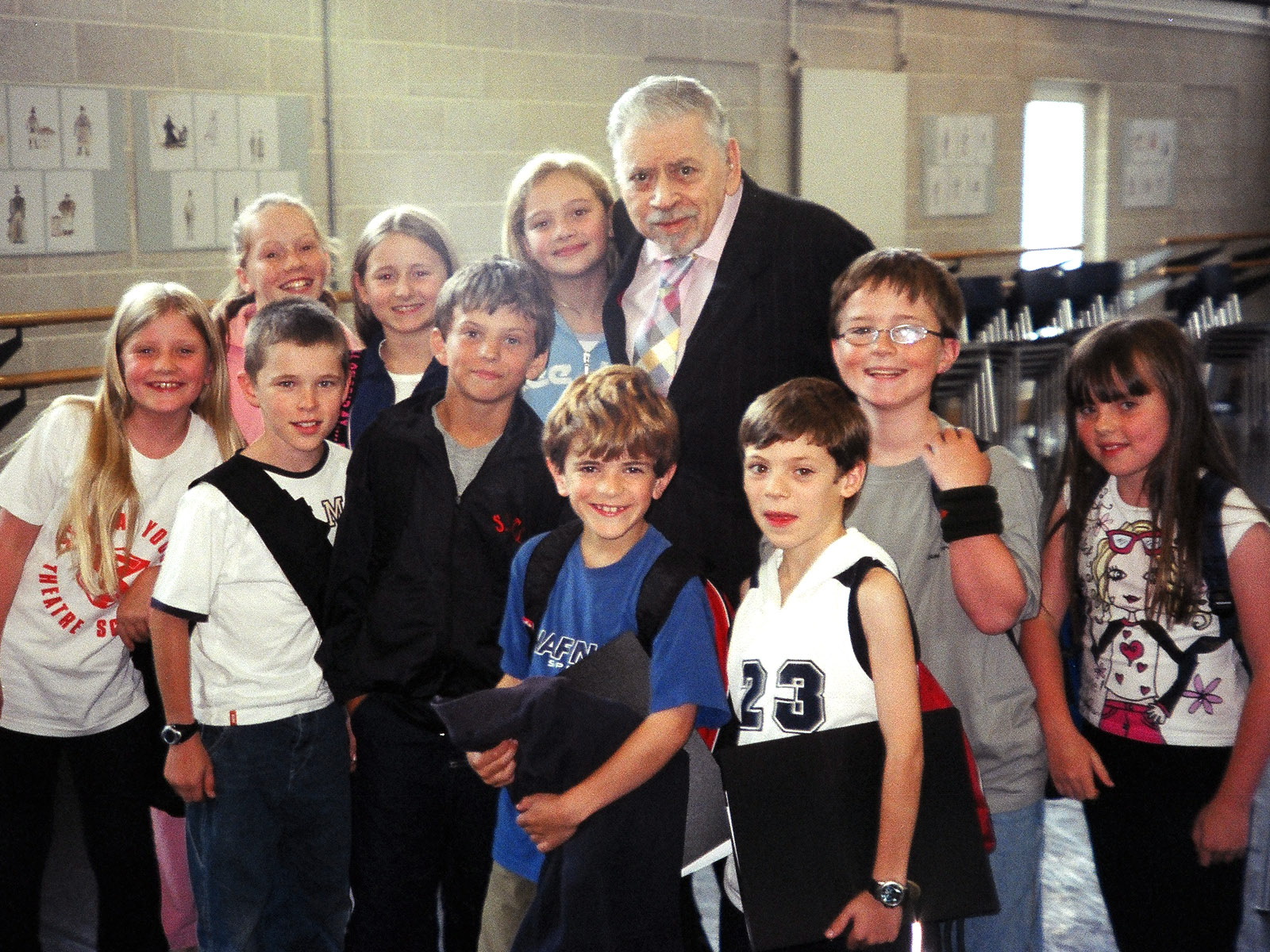
Harry Stott (front centre) and the cast of Mary Poppins, 2004

Stott's theatre experience includes the role of Michael Banks in the West End theatre production of Mary Poppins for which he also sang in the cast recording.

In 2008, he was one of three boys selected on the TV show I'd Do Anything to share the title role in Cameron Mackintosh's 2009 West End revival of Oliver! at the Theatre Royal Drury Lane. He alternated the role with Gwion Wyn Jones and Laurence Jeffcoate. The cast featured Jodie Prenger who won her role of Nancy on I'd Do Anything, Burn Gorman as Bill Sikes and Rowan Atkinson as Fagin. He performed on the show's opening night of 14 January 2009, and is featured on the cast recording. He played the role from January until July 2009.

He played the character of Lupus in the television series Roman Mysteries, based on the novels of the same name by Caroline Lawrence. Lupus cannot speak, and interacts with his friends through sign language, writing and drawing.

== Later career ==
Stott is now an independent journalist, and has worked as a producer at Adrift Entertainment. He now works as a Producer for Message Heard Media and his highlight is attending the ARIAS awards for his self-proclaimed 'amazing show' Power Lines in partnership with The Kyiv Independent. He hosts a monthly radio show on London's TWR (Totally Wired Radio).
