= The Code of Romulus =

2007 novella by Caroline Lawrence

- World Book Day edition
- Author: Caroline Lawrence
- Cover artist: Peter Sutton, Fred van Deelen
- Language: English
- Series: The Roman Mysteries
- Genre: Historical novel
- Publisher: Orion Childrens Books
- Publication date: 1 February 2007
- Publication place: United Kingdom
- Media type: Print (Paperback)
- Pages: 80pp
- ISBN: 978-1-84255-580-4
- OCLC: 73956799

The Code of Romulus is a children's novella by Caroline Lawrence, published in 2007 to celebrate the 10th anniversary of World Book Day. It is a re-publication of the short story Bread and Circuses that appeared in the anthology The Mammoth Book of Roman Whodunits published in 2003.

The story takes place in Ostia in November 79 AD, between the events of the fifth and sixth books (The Dolphins of Laurentum and The Twelve Tasks of Flavia Gemina.)

== Plot summary ==
The story begins with Flavia Gemina, the protagonist of the book, arguing with her tutor, Aristo. Flavia insists that she is a detective, though Aristo doubts there is such a word. Aristo says that if Flavia can solve the mystery of who has been stealing rolls from Pistor the Baker, then they will not do maths for a month, just read stories. However, if Flavia fails, she can never mention the word "detective" again.

Flavia and her friends realise that the theft must be an inside job, and decide to find out more about the baker's household. They make friends with the baker's younger son, Porcius, who shows them around the bakery and introduces them to his family and the slaves who work there. He also shows them his "Circus Minimus", where he races mice. Nubia is especially interested in the donkeys who turn the millstone.

The next day they split up to follow the different suspects. Lupus follows Porcius and his brother to school, Nubia follows his sister to the temple, and Jonathan follows the slave Teneme to the granary, while Flavia talks to the slave Tertius, the bakery accountant. He shows her the magic square puzzle, the Sator square, which eventually leads her to the solution of the mystery.

Flavia and Nubia attend a secret pre-dawn gathering of Christians and unmask the well-meaning thief, but promise not to tell on condition the stealing stops.

== Allusions to other works ==
Aristo is shocked to hear that Flavia has been reading Ovid's Metamorphoses, which is full of "unsuitable" stories, but he admits it is a masterpiece and agrees to read them excerpts. Flavia later secretly consults the scroll to understand Tertius's reference to Erysichthon.

Jonathan refers to the Tanak, particularly the Psalms which he appears to know by heart. He also begins to teach Flavia the Pater Noster.
