= Hard Boiled Sweets =

2012 British crime drama film

- Directed by: David L.G. Hughes
- Written by: David L.G. Hughes
- Produced by: Lara Greenway; Demelza Jones; David L.G. Hughes
- Starring: Adrian Bower; Philip Barantini; Elizabeth Berrington
- Cinematography: Sara Deane
- Edited by: Lloyd George
- Music by: Tom Morrison
- Production company: Fatal Black
- Distributed by: Universal Pictures
- Release date: 9 March 2012
- Running time: 84 minutes
- Language: English
- Box office: $6,462

Hard Boiled Sweets is a 2012 British crime drama film written and directed by David L.G. Hughes. It tells the story of a group of squabbling Essex gangsters. The cast includes two actors (Paul Freeman and Ian Hart) that had appeared in Hughes' earlier short film A Girl and a Gun from which this, his first feature, was developed.

== Plot ==
London crime boss Jimmy the Gent travels to Southend in Essex to collect some monies owed to him by local gangster Shrewd Eddie. There, various assorted gangsters, corrupt police and petty criminals attempt to steal from Jimmy a case containing £1 million in cash.

== Main cast ==
Actor	Role
Philip Barantini	Dean
Elizabeth Berrington	Jackie
Adrian Bower	Gerry
Liz May Brice	Jenna
Paul Freeman	Shrewd Eddie
Ty Glaser	Porsche
Ian Hart	Joyce
Nathaniel Martello-White	Jermaine
Danny Sapani	Leroy
Peter Wight	Jimmy the Gent
Scot Williams	Johnny
René Zagger	Fred

== Critical reception ==
The film was largely negatively received by reviewers. The Guardian's Henry Barnes described it as a glossy hybrid of American noir and British gangster films "with nothing under the wrapper". Tom Seymour of Empire summed it up as "A miserable mess of gangland cliches and narrative tangle". Tom Huddleston of Time Out also found it clichéd – "more Cockernee crime by numbers" – but also suggested that it had "a fistful of decent throwaway gags and enough plot surprises to just about carry it through the rough patches". ScreenDaily praised its technical aspects including Anders Bundgaard's opening credit sequence and Sara Deane's cinematography, describing it overall as "an intriguing debut".

== Box office ==
The film received a limited release and according to Box Office Mojo took only $6,462 in two weeks in cinemas. It was released on DVD and Blu-ray Disc on 30 April 2012.
