= Floopaloo, Where Are You? =

French animated children's TV show

- Genre: Comedy
- Created by: Marc du Pontavice
- Developed by: Fabien Limousin
- Directed by: Jean Cayrol; Hugo Gittard (season 1); Frédéric Martin (season 2)
- Voices of: Lizzie Waterworth; Teresa Gallagher; Gina Murray; Joanna Ruiz; Charlie Hayes; Penny Rawlins; Wayne Forester
- Theme music composer: Vincent Artaud
- Opening theme: "Floopaloo Theme"
- Ending theme: "Floopaloo Theme" (instrumental)
- Composer: Vincent Artaud
- Countries of origin: France; Italy (season 1)
- Original language: French
- No. of seasons: 2
- No. of episodes: 104

Production
- Executive producer: Marc du Pontavice
- Producer: Marc du Pontavice
- Running time: 11 minutes
- Production companies: Xilam; Castelrosso Films (season 1); Rai Fiction (season 1)

Original release
- Network: Canal+ Family; Télétoon+ (2014); France 5 (Zouzous)
- Release: February 4, 2011 – December 4, 2014

Floopaloo, Where Are You? (French: Flapacha, où es-tu?, also simply called Floopaloo) is an animated series based on an original idea by Xilam's producer, Marc du Pontavice, and developed by Fabien Limousin with designs by Aurore Damant and Emmanuelle Fleury. Produced by Xilam in co-production with Castelrosso Films and Rai Fiction for the first season, and in association with France Télévisions for the first season and Télétoon+ and Canal+ Family for the second season, the series ran from 4 February 2011 to 4 December 2014 for two seasons and 104 episodes of 11 minutes each.

Announced in 2010, originally it was going to be called Summer Camp, and characters like Matt had different designs, which were revised by Aurore herself in the final version of the series.

== Plot ==
Two cousins, Matt and Lisa, are staying at summer camp in the woods where a creature named FloopaLoo lives. There, they discover a strange world where fish can play music and memory trees grow.

== Characters ==
- Matt - A very intelligent and cultured 12-year old boy, with the dream of becoming a journalist; he tries at all costs to get news to put on his blog. He dreams of photographing the Floopaloo (diminutive of Flapascià), the king of the forest. He wants to be a reporter. He is considered the most flustered of the characters, given his tendency to blush. Sometimes he behaves strangely. He is madly in love with Annetta, but in "Big Brother", crushes on someone else under the effect of a spell.
- Lisa - Matt's cousin, 11 and a half years old. She is smart and is Greta's best friend. She inherited the sioux from her grandmother, which allows her to discover and access many things about the enchanted forest. She is allergic to strawberries. She is the keeper of the forest's secrets, written in her secret notebook.
- Malik - A very unfortunate boy, he always gets into a lot of trouble from which the Floopaloo saves him regularly. He has always been Bryan's best friend, with whom he stays for most of the day.
- Bryan - Passionate about extreme sports, he loves dirt because he hates washing. He loves everything to do with skateboarding, and is always looking for something new and exciting. In one episode he discovers his ability at painting nails, which he is very good at and is ashamed to tell his friends. His best friend is Malik and they do a lot of things together, even though Malik is always afraid of doing them. He is afraid of heights.
- Jeanne-Marie and Marie-Jeanne - Twins who are experts in fashion and beauty, they always read fashion magazines and love to nail each other and their friends. They define themselves as experts in love and form the "Love Brigade". They hate being the same in everything and hate it when their friends confuse them, but they will work hard to find the differences between the two. They always try to make fun of others, always in the field of love; as in the case of Bryan and Greta.
- Greta - A very intelligent and sensitive girl; she's the only one who loves math and holiday homework. Ignatius often uses it to attend to the accounting. She has a passion for poetry, for which she is very gifted. She is Lisa's best friend. She is stubborn and stubborn, hates making mistakes and once ends up going back in time, trying to avoid making a mistake in counting the score of a game.
- Olga (Beryl in the dub) - The director of the summer camp, she is very sweet and prefers to solve everything calmly and not by the hard way. She is in love with Hippolyte and is always embarrassed when she talks to him.
- Hippolyte (Ignatius in the dub) - Hippolyte may seem stern and at times almost evil, but in reality he is very sensitive and romantic, he is madly in love with Olga and always tries to get her attention and always blushes when he talks to her. He has a mania for giving tags of different colors according to the things done; he usually puts a red card in the children's hair calling it the "most severe punishment of the century". The red and yellow cards consist of weeks of washing dishes; naturally the red card corresponds to the longer punishment. Instead, the "bright card" and the "gold card" are additional cards given to Matt and Bryan respectively: Matt was awarded for a fake magic show, while Bryan had cleaned the campsite under the influence of a magic item from the forest. He is afraid of mice. He considers himself a champion of the card game. He is the only one in the camp who has ever seen the Floopaloo. In addition, he sometimes does the things he forbids the children to do. As a gag, he screams into his "secret jar".
- Annette - Helps supervise the summer camp; she's 18-year-old girl, she is full of energy and often uses nicknames for the kids like "bunnies" or "cubs". However, she becomes very nervous if someone makes her take a test. In one episode she becomes director in place of Olga. She is very young, there are not many years of difference between her and the boys. Matt really likes her.
- Squeak - A very intelligent squirrel who has a passion for candy and soft toys; often accompanies Matt and Lisa in their investigations of the Floopaloo. Lisa sometimes calls him "Squirrel". He is the same age as all the children in the camp.
- Waldo - A very clumsy and careless beaver and, like Squeak, cannot resist the sight of candy or treats, which he is crazy about. He always drops his lollipop in the lake.
- Flapacha (season 1) or Floopaloo (season 2) - the king of the enchanted forest, directs all the forest and through the Oracle of the Forest, to always know when someone is in trouble or needs help. No one has ever seen his true appearance but he is represented with two yellow eyes – some episodes reveal more details, such as blue fur and his scarf that smells of musk and caramel. He always helps all those in need and never hesitates to donate special things that are needed by the children of the camp. He has many helpers like his trusty ants who talk through Matt's cell phone and of course many other forest animals. He lives in a hut that moves, equipped with many comforts and pieces of technology. He usually goes to the Mini-club, a place where one has to eat magic cookies to get in.

== Episodes ==
=== Series overview ===
Season	Episodes	Originally aired	
Season	Episodes	Season premiere	Season finale
1	52	February 4, 2011	2012
2	52	2013	December 4, 2014

=== Season 1 (2011–12) ===
No. overall	No. in season	Title	Directed by	Written by	Storyboard by	Original release date
1	1	"Whodunnit?" "Pas vu, pas pris !"	Hugo Gittard	Fabien Limousin; Story by : Hugo Gittard	Hugo Gittard	February 4, 2011
Clumsy Malik accidentally kicks a soccer ball straight in strict superintendent Ignatius' window, but he suspects Matt and threatens to punish him unless he can prove otherwise. Matt and Lisa use a magic spray made of the legendary Floopaloo's magic plants to find the culprit.
2	2	"Lake Yuck" "Le lac Crado"	Hugo Gittard	Fabien Limousin	Jean Cayrol	TBA
Matt and Lisa encounter Waldo the beaver, who wants to move in the camp after his river is found in a mess. But the longer he stays, the more he wears out his welcome-- and the cousins become more suspicious.
3	3	"Secret Party" "Boum sècrete"	Hugo Gittard	Hugo Gittard	Michael Sanlaville	TBA
To celebrate Greta's birthday, Beryl suggests spending the evening around the campfire, with Ignatius on guitar. Of course the kids think this is a corny idea and so they decide to organize a secret party for Greta in the dorms. The problem is going to be how to distract the adults and carry it off discreetly so that Greta won't find out. While trying to figure out how to get rid of the adults, Matt sits down on an anthill and the leader of the ants' army starts talking to Matt through his MP3 player! Lisa gets all excited when she remembers her grandmother's advice: "When you have a problem with big people ask somebody smaller than you to help". The ants are going to help our friends get rid of the adults during the surprise party... but what the kids didn't count on is that the ants have decided to crash the party too!
4	4	"The River Runs Wild" "Les pieds dans l'eau"	Hugo Gittard	Sébastien Guérout	Jean Cayrol	TBA
All cuddled up in their blankets, the happy campers are outside, looking up at the starry sky above their heads. The adults have accompanied them of course. The kids are very excited at being able to spend the night outside! But early the next morning, they have a rather shocking surprise: during the night, the river has flooded and the bridge that connected them to the mainland has been washed away! Overnight, their campsite has become an island and they have no way of communicating with the outside world! And since the water is continuing to rise, they are going to have to find a way to escape very fast. Suddenly, a huge tree trunk falls and to their astonishment, it straddles the river, creating a life-saving bridge! Evacuation of the island goes without a hitch until a huge wave carries the tree trunk downstream, leaving our two cousins still stranded on the island while Bryan, Greta, Malik and the twins, plus all the adults, are on the mainland. What are they going to do?!
5	5	"An Endless Day" "Nuit blanche"	Hugo Gittard	Maël Le Mée; Raphaelle Rio	Céline Gobinet	TBA
The camp's trip to the woods takes them to an area where the night never falls, and the kids have to make sure the adults don't notice something amiss.
6	6	"Summer Circus" "Cirque d'été"	Hugo Gittard	Maël Le Mée; Raphaelle Rio	Alexandre Viano	TBA
Lisa helps Malik improve his juggling act for the camp's summer circus night with Floopaloo's magic juggling balls. But things fall apart when a jealous Matt borrows a magic wand himself.
7	7	"Enough is Enough!" "Trop, c'est trop"	Hugo Gittard	Hugo Gittard	Céline Gobinet	TBA
Ignatius leaves the camp in a huff after feeling that no one respects him. As he relaxes in a magical cave that provides him luxury, everyone else learns the hard way how much they really need him.
8	8	"The Laughing Seeds" "Graine de clown"	Hugo Gittard	Sébastien Guérout	Andrès Fernandez	TBA
Lisa and Matt discover a plant that can grow candy with the sound of laughter. They and their friends decide to collect as many laughs as possible to grow enough candy and find the Floopaloo with it.
9	9	"The Tree of Wisdom" "L'Arbre de la sagesse"	Hugo Gittard	Hugo Gittard	Alexandre Viano	TBA
Lisa and Matt solve a feud between Bryan and the twins with a magic tree that saps away every amount of negativity, and use it to help the whole camp.
10	10	"Malik's Thing" "Le truc de Malik"	Hugo Gittard and Jean Cayrol	Juliette Turner	Andrès Fernandez	TBA
Malik finds a new blanket after his old one is accidentally shredded, but it belongs to the Floopaloo, whose ensuing tantrums threaten to end summer vacation early.
11	11	"Fortune Teller" "Ruses de Sioux"	Hugo Gittard	Sébastien Guérout	Céline Gobinet	TBA
Inspired by a fortune-reading trick Lisa learned from her grandma, Matt tries it and is convinced everyone will meet the Floopaloo at a dangerous swamp. Lisa must stop them before something bad happens to them.
12	12	"Catch Me If You Can!" "Alerte au glouton !"	Hugo Gittard and Jean Cayrol	Fred Valion	Alexandre Viano	TBA
As he and Lisa are stuck washing dishes as punishment, Matt uses a small yet voracious creature to finish faster, and it soon wreaks havoc on the camp.
13	13	"Matt's Double" "L'Esprit du lac"	Hugo Gittard and Jean Cayrol	Grégory Baranes; Vincent Bonjour	Andrès Fernandez	TBA
A magic river causes an identical, watery copy of Matt to appear, and the kids have to find him and bring him home before the adults notice.
14	14	"The Grumpy Moaner Hunt" "La chasse au bougogneux râleur"	Hugo Gittard and Jean Cayrol	Cédric Stéphan	Céline Gobinet	TBA
The adults pull their annual camp prank on the kids involving a hunt for the "Grumpy Moaner", who is none other than the Floopaloo. The group try to grind the hunt to a halt, but things turn sinister when Annette goes missing.
15	15	"Amazing Glue!" "Ça colle !"	Hugo Gittard and Jean Cayrol	Mélanie Duval	Céline Gobinet	TBA
Malik gets glue stuck to his shoes, and discovers it makes him capable of walking on anything anywhere. But when he, Matt, and Lisa come back to get more, disaster strikes.
16	16	"I Love Sushi!" "Sushi d'Amour"	Hugo Gittard and Jean Cayrol	Augusto Zanovello; Christophe Poujol	Lisa Arioli	TBA
Greta catches a magic fish which is attracted to music, and keeps him as her beloved pet "Sushi". When Sushi wanders off after Annette's harmonica, an investigation launches as Greta accuses Squeak.
17	17	"Close the Door, There's a Breeze!" "Attention aux courants d'air"	Hugo Gittard and Jean Cayrol	Sébastien Guérout	Luca Fernicola	TBA
A severe lack of wind drives Lisa and Matt to investigate, and they discover a doorway which is home to a massive, sentinent tornado that wreaks havoc upon being unleashed.
18	18	"Big Brother" "Le grand frère"	Hugo Gittard and Jean Cayrol	Juliette Turner	Andrès Fernandez	TBA
Bryan borrows some magic manure to help him win a gardening contest, but it comes with the side effect of turning him into a charming young adult who attracts Annette's love.
19	19	"The Hill of Secrets" "La colline aux secrets"	Hugo Gittard and Jean Cayrol	Cédric Stéphan	Thomas Astruc	TBA
Lisa takes Greta to the Hill of Secrets to help her harmlessly spill one, but Matt records its contents and soon finds himself randomly repeating them.
20	20	"The Apple of Love" "Pomme d'amour"	Hugo Gittard and Jean Cayrol	Cédric Stéphan	Andrès Fernandez	TBA
The kids grow an apple of love to bring Ignatius and Beryl together, but a mishap causes him to fall in love with, of all people, Squeak.
21	21	"A Really Old Boy" "Un grand gamin"	Hugo Gittard and Jean Cayrol	Story by : Hugo Gittard; Teleplay by : Fred Valion	Lisa Arioli	TBA
Ignatius encounters the Floopaloo, who wipes his memories in a haste. He soon becomes an unruly teenager in a man's body who bonds with Bryan.
22	22	"Squirrel for a Day" "Miss Casse-Noisettes"	Hugo Gittard and Jean Cayrol	Sébastien Guérout	Thomas Astruc	TBA
A magic plant swaps Lisa and Squeak's bodies, and his owner soon grows jealous when people start paying more attention to Squeak and his feats.
23	23	"Bramble Bush Dreams" "La ronce des rêves"	Hugo Gittard and Jean Cayrol	Maël Le Mée; Raphaelle Rio	Céline Gobinet	TBA
Matt pricks himself on a magical bramble bush that can transport whoever touches it into a dream. When he learns of this, Bryan goads him into playing a payback prank on Ignatius.
24	24	"Wake Up Call" "Réveille-moi si tu peux"	Hugo Gittard and Jean Cayrol	Sébastien Guérout	Luca Fernicola	TBA
A large, docile bear called the Giga-Bear is asleep in the camp's cellar, and grows whenever he is hungry. Can the kids get him out before someone notices?
25	25	"It's Bunny Time!" "Le coup du lapin"	Hugo Gittard and Jean Cayrol	David Robert; Maud Garnier	Christian Ragoust	TBA
The kids take in a bunny that can manipulate time when stroked, while Squeak gets jealous of the newcomer.
26	26	"Strange Tomatoes" "Drôles de tomates"	Hugo Gittard and Jean Cayrol	Mélanie Duval	Andrès Fernandez	TBA
When Beryl grows a flock of sentinent tomatoes with magic manure, Bryan and Matt take them under their wing as the kids try to keep them safe.
27	27	"The Five Spotted Ferret" "Le furet à cinq tâches"	Hugo Gittard and Jean Cayrol	Juliette Turner	Thomas Astruc	TBA
The Floopaloo rewards Beryl for her ecological efforts with a magical ferret that grants five wishes per spot, but misunderstood wishes spark chaos.
28	28	"Adults for a Day" "Chefs d'un jour"	Hugo Gittard and Jean Cayrol	Maël Le Mée; Raphaelle Rio	Alexandre Viano	TBA
Beryl has the adults and the kids swap roles for a day, and the cousins and their friends struggle to fill in their shoes.
29	29	"Scoop of the Century" "Rendez-vous manqué"	Hugo Gittard and Jean Cayrol	Sébastien Guérout	Marco Allard	TBA
Matt and Lisa take Ignatius and Beryl to the Tree of Courage to get them to admit their feelings and help Matt win a bet against the twins, who inadvertently drive a wedge between both adults when they sabotage the plan.
30	30	"The Golden Truffle" "Une truffe en or"	Hugo Gittard and Jean Cayrol	Cédric Stephan	Thomas Astruc	TBA
Ignatius, excited after Squeak unearths a truffle, organizes repeated truffle hunts to find more and earn money. When his renovations threaten the forest, the cousins, with their friends' help, must alert the Floopaloo and put a stop to the whole operation.
31	31	"The Invisible Boy" "Ni vu, ni connu"	Hugo Gittard and Jean Cayrol	Charles Vaucelle; Fred Valion	Floriano Gerardi	TBA
Matt accidentally turns Bryan invisible with a magic shampoo, and while he and the others try to find and undo the effect so he can win a bet against Ignatius, Bryan takes a liking to his new state.
32	32	"Alien Encounters" "Rendez-nous Hippolyte !"	Hugo Gittard and Jean Cayrol	Maël Le Mée; Raphaelle Rio	Jean-Charles Fink	TBA
Ignatius is sent to investigate a mysterious green glow in the forest, and comes back a seemingly changed man whom the kids believe is a disguised alien.
33	33	"Tornado"	Hugo Gittard and Jean Cayrol	Cédric Stephan	Thomas Astruc	TBA
Malik finds a small yet fast snail named Tornado, who helps him win the camp's snail race. However, Tornado is also the Floopaloo's recycler with an insatiable appetite for papers.
34	34	"Supermatt"	Hugo Gittard and Jean Cayrol	Fred Valion	Marco Allard	TBA
Bryan challenges Matt to the camp's summer Olympics, but despite former champion Ignatius' help, Matt just can't match up to him... until the superintendent unwittingly gives him a drink made of plants that makes Matt the strongest of the camp.
35	35	"The Longest Day" "Le jour le plus long"	Hugo Gittard and Jean Cayrol	Anetta Zucchi	Lisa Arioli	TBA
On the longest day of the summer, the kids try to stop Ignatius from beating his record climbing the Red Rock, where the Floopaloo relaxes on this very day.
36	36	"The Lazy Bees" "Jour de miel"	Hugo Gittard and Jean Cayrol	Gaël Gittard	Marco Allard	TBA
Ignatius captures a strange swarm of bees who manage to hypnotize the entire camp one by one to become their slaves. The kids must defeat them in a series of challenges to stop their takeover.
37	37	"Extra-Light Blackberries" "Les mûres légères"	Hugo Gittard and Jean Cayrol	Valentina Mazzola	Christian Ragoust	TBA
To win Beryl's pie contest, Lisa and Matt borrow pick literally Extra-Light Blueberries to make a delicious pie. But when Matt takes a bite, he finds himself floating in the air as the others scramble to bring him down before someone notices.
38	38	"The Floopaloo's Cat" "Le chat du Flapacha"	Hugo Gittard and Jean Cayrol	Valentina Mazzola	Jean-Luc Abiven	TBA
The Floopaloo's cat is enamored with Bryan, who quickly takes a liking to him. The kids have to find a way to convince him to give him back before Ignatius captures it.
39	39	"Surprise Egg" "L'œuf surprise"	Hugo Gittard and Jean Cayrol	Maël Le Mée; Raphaelle Rio	Christophe Leborgne	TBA
The kids find an egg amidst the mountains that Malik volunteers to look over. To everyone's surprise, a baby mountain hatches out of it.
40	40	"Lucky-Charm" "Le porte-bonheur"	Hugo Gittard and Jean Cayrol	Sébastien Guérout	Marco Allard	TBA
Malik goes through a stroke of luck after an incident during a mission to retrieve Wapi-Therese's lost bracelet, and is convinced Squeak is his lucky charm.
41	41	"The Prettiest Plant" "La plus belle plante"	Hugo Gittard and Jean Cayrol	Elena Pandolfi	Thomas Astruc	TBA
Greta is captured by a bush shaped like her after she insults it, and it won't release her unless her friends can prove it is the most beautiful in the land.
42	42	"Cold Snap" "Coup de froid"	Hugo Gittard and Jean Cayrol	Annetta Zucchi	Christophe Leborgne	TBA
When Bryan borrows the Floopaloo's cold stone to save the camp's ice cream stock, he unwittingly causes an early winter.
43	43	"Hey, I'm Dreaming, Right?" "Non mais je rêve !"	Hugo Gittard and Jean Cayrol	Marie Eynard; Claire Espagno	Marco Allard	TBA
A mishap with a magic mushroom causes Annette to learn the truth about the valley. Now the kids must convince her she is dreaming before she can tell Beryl and Ignatius, whom a sick Greta is trying to stall.
44	44	"Flea-Big-Brains" "Grosses têtes"	Hugo Gittard and Jean Cayrol	Emmanuel Leduc	Thomas Astruc	TBA
Bryan and Ignatius hide in a cave which somehow turns them into geniuses-- who can't stop scratching.
45	45	"Yours Truly, Floopaloo!" "Signé Flapacha"	Hugo Gittard and Jean Cayrol	Mélanie Duval	Guillaume Lebois	TBA
When Ignatius' tools go missing, Lisa and Matt believe that the Floopaloo borrowed them, while Ignatius teams up with the latter to catch the "thief".
46	46	"The Long Sleep" "Le grand sommeil"	Hugo Gittard and Jean Cayrol	Juliette Turner	Céline Gobinet	TBA
The Floopaloo's sleep is affecting the whole camp, and the kids must find and wake him up before they fall asleep too.
47	47	"The Slothalopolous" "Le grogloups"	Hugo Gittard and Jean Cayrol	Fred Valion	Stéphane Annette	TBA
Matt and the twins successfully get the camp to go an expedition after the girls' horoscopes detail a legendary encounter, but they find themselves having to avoid running afoul of the gigantic Slothalopolous. Meanwhile, the twins flaunt their horoscope knowledge.
48	48	"Ignatius' Boomerang" "Le boomerang d'Hippolyte"	Hugo Gittard and Jean Cayrol	Valentina Mazzola	Céline Gobinet	TBA
Bryan "borrows" Ignatius' prized boomerang to play with, but when Matt loses it by mistake, they and Lisa have to find it before Bryan suffers a hefty punishment.
49	49	"The Moustache" "La moustache"	Hugo Gittard and Jean Cayrol	Annetta Zucchi	Stéphane Annette	TBA
A mysterious butterfly swipes Ignatius' mustache as punishment for vandalizing the forest's trees, so Lisa and Greta hunt down the thief while the others distract Ignatius.
50	50	"The Bubble" "La bulle"	Hugo Gittard and Jean Cayrol	Marie Eynard; Armand Robin	Thomas Astruc	TBA
The day after the Floopaloo's birthday, the camp is engulfed in a gigantic, invisible bubble, and Matt, Lisa and Squeak escape to get to the bottom of the mystery.
51	51	"Moonless Night" "Nuit sans lune"	Hugo Gittard and Jean Cayrol	Gaël Gittard	Céline Gobinet	TBA
When the moon's light goes out, the kids venture into the forest to find the cause, where Matt and Malik try to overcome their fear of the dark and encounter an owl who may know about something about the issue.
52	52	"Tastes & Colours" "Les goûts et les couleurs"	Hugo Gittard and Jean Cayrol	Fred Valion	Céline Gobinet	2012
The water in the camp runs dry just as the river loses its transparency, and since the camp depends on it, the kids must get to the bottom of it. Meanwhile, Ignatius tries his hand at plumbing to fix the problem.

=== Season 2 (2013–14) ===
No. overall	No. in season	Title	Written by	Storyboard by	Original release date
53	1	"Mouse Trouble" "Soucis de souris"	Frédéric Valion	Cédric Guarneri	2013
One night, Ignatius is bitten by a mouse, and the days after that see various food ransackings in the camp, driving the kids to investigate.
54	2	"Aa-Choo!" "A tes souhaits !"	Mathilde Maraninchi; Antonin Poirée	Cédric Guarneri	TBA
A magic dandelion causes Mary-Jane to start randomly teleporting around the camp with each sneeze. The kids must keep her under control long enough to find a cure.
55	3	"Floopaloo's Treehouse" "La cabane du Flapacha"	Maël Le Mée; Raphaëlle Rio	Mickaël Mérigot	TBA
The kids discover the Floopaloo's treehouse in the forest, but when Ignatius follows Matt one night there and sets up camp, they have to get him out before the Floopaloo finds out.
56	4	"Mini Matt"	Max Mamoud; Georges-Olivier Tzanos	Cédric Guarneri	TBA
Matt eats a magic cookie that shrinks him with each bite, and he and Lisa end up in a particular place in the forest when they go to find a cure.
57	5	"Daredevil" "Poule mouillée, tête brûlée"	Frédéric Vallon	Mickaël Mérigot	TBA
Bryan deviates the camp's forest tour through a new, dangerous path, where Ignatius promptly falls into a river that washes away his fear and turns him into a reckless daredevil.
58	6	"Magic Broccoli" "Brocolicieux"	Eric Rondeaux; Catherine Le Roux	Cédric Guarneri	TBA
Matt swaps out Beryl's broccoli with the Floopaloo's special, more delicious variant, causing nearly everyone to get addicted to them.
59	7	"Malik's Exile" "L'exil de Malik"	Maël Le Mée; Raphaëlle Rio	Mickaël Mérigot	TBA
Tired of being made fun of for his clumsiness, Malik ventures into the forest to find a skill with help from the Floopaloo and his assistant, an equally clumsy yet kind-hearted bird. Meanwhile, his friends head themselves to find him.
60	8	"The Two Queens" "Les deux reines"	Mathilde Maraninchi; Antonin Poirée	Cédric Guarneri	TBA
The twins find a magic crown in the forest that allows them to make everyone obey them. Lisa has to convince them to give it back, especially after Floopaloo finds out and seemingly reveals a terrible secret about it.
61	9	"Beryl's Double" "La main à la pâte"	Catherine Le Roux	Cédric Guarneri	TBA
Ignatius makes a statue of Beryl that goes missing. The next day, he, Matt, and Lisa begin noticing Beryl's odd behavior, particularly when she plans to take Ignatius on a "vacation".
62	10	"Floopaloo's Cold" "Le rhume du Flapacha"	Philippe Clerc	Stéphane Annette	TBA
The Floopaloo catches Malik's cold, so the kids work to find a cure so the king of the forest can handle his duties again.
63	11	"Greedy-Gumdrops" "Le vilain petit gourmand"	Philippe Clerc	Stéphane Annette	TBA
Lisa and Matt feed the Floopaloo Beryl's delicious strawberry pies, but Ignatius interferes-- and soon pays the price for his own gluttony.
64	12	"Ignatius Finds His Voice" "Hippolyte cherche sa voix"	Max Mamoud; Georges-Olivier Tzanos	Stéphane Annette	TBA
Lisa and Matt take Ignatius to a magic tree in the forest to practice his singing, whose plant borrows his voice for a concert for the Floopaloo. Lisa tries to convince it to give it back amidst Matt's sudden suspicious behavior and Ignatius going through Beryl's "cures".
65	13	"Bryan's Admirer" "L'admirateur de Bryan"	Philippe Clerc	Cédric Guarneri	TBA
After Bryan saves his life while evading Ignatius, Floopaloo begins emulating him as a thanks. Unfortunately, both the camp and the forest suffer its smelly effects.
66	14	"Welcome to the Termites" "Bienvenue chez les termites"	Philippe Clerc	Mickaël Mérigot	TBA
The kids body-swap with a group of termites to evade Ignatius' tight schedule, but learn the hard way the colony's boss is stricter than their superintendent.
67	15	"The Delegate" "Le délégué"	Maël Le Mée; Raphaëlle Rio	Stéphane Annette	TBA
Greta competes against Bryan for the position of camp delegate, but when Bryan proves too persuasive, Lisa gives her a magic tie to even the odds.
68	16	"Greta Spreads Her Wings" "Greta sort de son cocon"	Max Mamoud; Georges-Olivier Tzanos	Cédric Guarneri	TBA
Feeling Greta needs a break from all her work for Ignatius, Lisa takes her to a magic flower for a massage, but accidentally turns her into a butterfly whom Ignatius tries to capture.
69	17	"Little Cloud" "Petit nuage"	Yannick Hervieu	Mickaël Mérigot	TBA
The children are in the vegetable garden, and Bryan gets rained on by a little cloud... that follows him everywhere, obeying his commands like a pet puppy. How cool! Bryan uses the cloud to clean the camp, but Floopaloo doesn't appreciate that...
70	18	"Little Ignatius Grows Up" "Petit Hippolyte deviendra grand"	Philippe Clerc	Stéphane Annette	TBA
Ignatius is left in charge for the day, but he is sent flying through the rejuvination trunk after an accident during a hike and becomes an adorable toddler whom the kids look after while Matt handles his chores.
71	19	"A Furry Gift" "Un cadeau au poil"	Philippe Clerc	Cédric Guarneri	TBA
Ignatius knits a scarf out of the Floopaloo's magic fur as a gift for Beryl's birthday, and it soon comes to life and befriends Lisa, who had a falling-out with Squeak just as things around the camp begin to get eaten.
72	20	"Dream Hair" "Une chevelure de rêve"	Catherine Le Roux	Mickaël Mérigot	TBA
To stop them from badgering her about her hair, Lisa tricks the twins with a fake ceremony to make theirs look prettier. But disaster strikes when Mary-Jane goes missing right after she borrows the notebook for a solution.
73	21	"The Clipperbug" "Le scarapince"	Sophie & Stéphane Melchior-Durand; Jérôme Erbin	Mickaël Mérigot	TBA
Bryan turns out be a good manicure artist and takes his skills to the forest, but incurs the wrath of a clipperbug when he unwittingly costs him his business.
74	22	"Spooked Out" "La grande frousse"	Jérôme Erbin	Cédric Guarneri	TBA
Matt manages to scare everyone with a terrifying tale, including the Floopaloo, who has a nightmare that soon traps everyone inside.
75	23	"Help Yourself!" "Faut pas se gêner !"	Max Mamoud; George-Olivier Tzanos	Cédric Guarneri	TBA
Matt and Lisa meet a squirrel-badger, who saves them from falling into a hole. He changes himself into a "human" and invites himself to camp. A fast-talker, the squirrel-badger-man charms Beryl and the kids... and overshadows poor Ignatius...
76	24	"No Downloading" "Téléchargement interdit !"	Baptiste Heidrich	Stéphane Annette	TBA
Matt hacks into Floopaloo's computer to download the Secret Notebook onto his mobile phone. But, though he doesn't realise it right away, whatever he downloads from the computer disappears in the real world...
77	25	"Changing Twins" "Les jumelles désaccordées"	Maël Le Mée; Raphaëlle Rio	Cédric Guarneri	TBA
Unhappy with how people confuse them for the other, the twins go to the Forest Tuner to give one of them a unique personality. Mary-Jane's new tomboy personality, however, makes Mary-Lou feel left out.
78	26	"An Endless Error" "Une erreur sans fin"	Jérôme Erbin	Mickaël Mérigot	TBA
Mortified over a calculation error during a game, Greta uses a time-traveling flower to try and undo it.
79	27	"Floopaloo's Cuddle Toy" "Le doudou gros dodo"	Jean Cayrol	Stéphane Annette	TBA
Matt and Lisa accidentally and gradually put the whole camp to sleep using the Floopaloo's Cuddle Doodle. Meanwhile, Ignatius and a confused Beryl investigate the sudden disappearances.
80	28	"Friends for Life?" "Amis pour la vie ?"	Baptiste Heidrich	Mickaël Mérigot	TBA
Greta and Bryan can't get along-- and things get worse when Lisa seemingly accidentdally binds them together with a magic ritual.
81	29	"Popcorn Break" "Pause Pop-corn"	Elisa Loche	Cédric Guarneri	TBA
Malik's newest gift from the Floopaloo is a magic popcorn kernel that can cause time to stop. Matt recruits him for his magic show, but indavertantly makes Malik feel left out.
82	30	"Prepared to Do Anything" "Prête à tout"	Cédric Guarneri	Mickäel Mérigot	TBA
Lisa will do anything to prove to the Floopaloo that she deserves a mystical feather previously gifted to Wapi-Therese-- until it alienates her friends.
83	31	"Big Fibber!" "Gros menteur !"	Baptiste Heidrich	Stéphane Annette	TBA
The Floopaloo sends Matt a magic cherry that attaches itself to him and grows with each lie, and the only way out is by telling the truth. Meanwhile, Ignatius discovers Matt's photos of "rare animals", which puts the aspiring reporter in a tough spot.
84	32	"The Night of the Shooting Beavers" "La nuit des castors filants"	Renaud Gagnon	Jérôme Fardini	TBA
On the night of the shooting beavers, Lisa comes down with a mysterious allergy just as she gets tickets for the event.
85	33	"The Hole of Forgetfulness" "Le trou de l'oubli"	Baptiste Heidrich	Anh-Tu Cao	TBA
After a falling-out with Bryan, Malik rips a photo of them and drops it into the Hole of Forgetfulness, wiping all his memories with Bryan in the process.
86	34	"The Housework Fairy" "La fée du logis"	Jérôme Erbin	Cédric Guarneri	TBA
The kids accidentally break Beryl's jar where she vents her anger, leaving her unable to control it. Believing she is simply stressed out, they equip Bryan with a pair of magic gloves to handle Beryl's work for her.
87	35	"Bad Losers" "Mauvais joueurs"	Yannick Hervieu; Jérôme Erbin	Mickaël Mérigot	TBA
Lisa is a sore loser when it comes to games, but the Floopaloo's magical cushion seat that she finds seems to change her luck, unaware that her friends are merely letting her win.
88	36	"Let the Party Begin!" "Que la fête commence !"	Fanny Courtillot	Anh-Tu Cao	TBA
Beryl and Ignatius square off in a sleepover competition, but when Ignatius' team's party proves to be lame, Bryan and Matt borrow a magical butterfly that evens the odds.
89	37	"A New Camp Leader" "Une nouvelle directrice"	Jérôme Erbin	Jérôme Fardini	TBA
The kids want to help Annette ace the annual staff test, but the "music" they give her turns her into a punk rock-like girl who ends up becoming the new director.
90	38	"So Emotional!" "Que d'émotions !"	Jean Cayrol	Cédric Guarneri	TBA
The kids borrow a magic sponge to control Ignatius' over-emotional responses, but he removes all of them by mistake and becomes emotionless.
91	39	"The Ace of Jokers" "Le maître de la blague"	Jean Cayrol	Anh-Tu Cao	TBA
Bryan reluctantly takes Ignatius as a student to teach him about the art of humor, while Lisa and Matt uncover a secret behind Bryan's skills.
92	40	"Do You Dare?" "Cap ou pas cap"	Jérôme Erbin	Mickaël Mérigot	TBA
Bryan and Malik's overdone dares lead them activating a switch that seemingly traps the camp inside a marble.
93	41	"Who's Counting?" "Le compte est bon ?"	Baptiste Heidrich; Jean Cayrol	Cédric Guarneri	TBA
Waldo informs the kids that they will lose both the notebook and the permission to borrow magic objects from the valley if they can't find all 500 of them. However, Greta accidentally breaks the last one and tries to stall Waldo behind the other kids' backs.
94	42	"Who is Boss?" "C'est qui le boss ?"	Cédric Guarneri	Jérôme Fardini	TBA
Squeak is discovered to be a year older than Ignatius in human years, and he soon usurps his place as camp leader.
95	43	"Thanks for the Gift!" "Merci du cadeau !"	Marianne Barbier	Anh-Tu Cao	TBA
Ignatius enlists Bryan's help of getting rid of Beryl's hideous makeshift lamp in exchange for his silence. But things turn sinister when the lamp seemimgly comes back to haunt them.
96	44	"Love Is a Rebellious Bird" "L'amour est un oiseau rebelle"	Fanny Courtillot	Cédric Guarneri	TBA
The Floopaloo gives Malik a magic flower to help him detect and learn about love. But it malfunctions and saps away all of Beryl's love for Ignatius in the form of a bird.
97	45	"Unwilling Heroes" "Héros malgré eux"	Jérôme Erbin	Mickaël Mérigot	TBA
Matt and Lisa becomes unwilling heroes when their confiscated gum blocks a leak from wetting their friends' stuff. When the attention gets too much, they set out to find the real hero.
98	46	"First Encounter" "Première rencontre"	Jean Cayrol	Anh-Tu Cao	TBA
Matt and Lisa discover that Ignatius and Beryl cannot remember their first encounter, and take to an odd place filled with memories of the camp.
99	47	"Radio Floopaloo" "Radio Flapacha"	Jérôme Erbin; Baptiste Heidrich	Cédric Guarneri	TBA
Matt and Lisa use the Floopaloo's radio, which alerts him of dangers around the forest, to take over his duties for the day. Meanwhile, Malik enjoys his newest gift, a mobile walker.
100	48	"Greta's Seeds" "Graines de Greta"	Jérôme Erbin	Jean Cayrol	TBA
To handle Ignatius' work and her own project for the talent show, Squeak takes Greta a magic part of the forest where she can grow her own clones out of a piece of hair. The clone soon however decides to grow more clones to help with favors around the camp.
101	49	"Sticky-Stuff" "La patacolle"	Maël Le Mée; Raphaëlle Rio	Cédric Guarneri	TBA
Malik gets in Ignatius' good graces thanks to the Floopaloo's Sticky-Stuff, which he needs to repair the forest when cracks begin to appear.
102	50	"His Majesty Bryan" "Sa majesté Bryan"	Jean Cayrol	Stéphane Annette	TBA
Bryan is crowned king of a group of fish after saving them from Ignatius, and they want his help to cross into a sacred river.
103	51	"Notebook-Less" "Privée de carnet"	Renaud Gagnon	Cédric Guarneri	TBA
Matt dares Lisa to go a whole day without her notebook to curb her dependency, just as various forest animals begin randomly showing up at the camp.
104	52	"Beryl's Pet" "Le chouchou"	Jean Cayrol	Cédric Guarneri	December 4, 2014
Bryan accidentally spills Beryl's tea powder and must find a new one to keep his place as her favorite, which leads to a strange chain of deals.
