= News at Twelve =

Television series

- Genre: Comedy; Sitcom
- Written by: Francis Sinclair
- Directed by: Alex Kirby
- Starring: Patrick Malahide; Sheila Fearn; Julia Foster; Liz May Brice; Mark Billingham; Ewan Phillips; Toni Collier
- Country of origin: United Kingdom
- Original language: English
- No. of series: 1
- No. of episodes: 6

Production
- Executive producer: Lewis Rudd
- Producer: Pamela Lonsdale
- Production company: Central Independent Television

Original release
- Network: ITV
- Release: 22 February – 28 March 1988

News at Twelve is a 1988 British television comedy for children, written by Cliff Francis and Jeremy Sinclair under the pseudonym of Francis Sinclair. The series followed 12-year-old Kevin Doyle (Ewan Phillips) and his nightly "news bulletins" about the events in his life (and some events from his imagination). The name of the TV series came from Kevin's age rather than the time the show itself aired, or of Kevin's news updates, which commonly featured his comical Basset Hound Baxter.

News at Twelve featured Patrick Malahide, Sheila Fearn, Julia Foster, Liz May Brice (credited as "Lisa Brice") and Mark Billingham.

This series was aired on ITV and made by Central TV. A US pilot version was made in 1991 by NBC starring, amongst others, Danny Gerard and Sarah Melici, but it was never screened.
