= Andy Paterson =

British film producer

Andy Paterson is a British film producer, screenwriter and former second unit director. He is married to Olivia Hetreed. He was educated at Bolton School and Oriel College, Oxford.

== Filmography ==
Feature films
| Year | Title | Credited as | | | Ref |
| Year | Title | Producer | Writer | Other | Ref |
|---|---|---|---|---|---|
| 2016 | Altamira | Yes | No | | |
| 2014 | Tigers | Yes | Yes | | |
| 2013 | The Railway Man | Yes | Yes | | |
| 2011 | Burning Man | Yes | No | | |
| 2008 | Incendiary | Yes | No | | |
| 2004 | Beyond the Sea | Yes | No | | |
| 2003 | Girl with a Pearl Earring | Yes | No | second unit director | |
| 1998 | Hilary and Jackie | Yes | No | | |
| 1995 | Restoration | Yes | No | | |
| 1982 | Privileged | Yes | No | assistant director | |
