= Joanna Ruiz =

British voice actress and singer

- Education: Royal Welsh College of Music & Drama
- Occupations: Voice actress, singer
- Years active: 1992–present
- Children: 2

Joanna Ruiz is a British voice actress and singer. She has mainly done voice acting for children's television shows.

== Career ==
In 1993, she moved to Cardiff, Wales and attended the Royal Welsh College of Music & Drama, where she sang in a band and performed jingles for radio and television commercials. Ruiz' breakthrough came when she was asked to audition for the role of Casper the Friendly Ghost for a re-dub of the 1995 film, and got the role after practising from the film's soundtrack. She discovered her skills at imitating young children, and shifted from acting to focus more on voice acting, although she decided to stay and finish her course.

Ruiz has provided voices for various children's television shows and commercials, including Make Way for Noddy, Fireman Sam, LazyTown, Fifi and the Flowertots, Horrid Henry, Poppy Cat, Toby's Travelling Circus, and Dennis & Gnasher: Unleashed!. She also did voices for audiobooks by David Walliams and David Baddiel.

== List of credits ==
- Moomin – Mrs. Fillyjonk (episodes 54-66), Fillyjonk Children, The Witch (episodes 62-78), Flip, The Twins' Mother, Orphanage Director, Sleeky, Bob (episode 74) (UK) (1992-1999)
- The Twins of Destiny – Julie Tournier (UK) (1994-1995)
- Casper – Casper the Friendly Ghost (UK) (1995)
- Loggerheads – Bjorn's Wife, Thora, additional voices (1998)
- Hilltop Hospital – Tiffany, Charlotte, additional voices (1999–2003)
- Make Way for Noddy – Tessie Bear, Martha Monkey, Clockwork Mouse, Mrs Skittle, Cecilia the Beetle (2001-2006)
- Clifford the Big Red Dog – Emily Elizabeth, Mrs. Bleakman (UK dub) (2002)
- Andy Pandy – Looby Loo, Orbie (2002)
- The Haunted Pumpkin of Sleepy Hollow – Nick (2003)
- Fireman Sam – Sarah, James, Helen Flood (Series 5, 2003)
- Little Robots – Sparky 2 (USA) (2003-)
- Miss Spider's Sunny Patch Friends – Squirt, Bounce (UK) (2004)
- Franklin – Mrs. Turtle, Beaver, Rabbit (UK) (2004) – billed as "Jo Ruiz Rodriguez"
- LazyTown – Pixel, Trixie (UK) (2004–2014)
- Clifford's Puppy Days – Emily Elizabeth (UK) (2004)
- Trotro – Trotro (2004–2005)
- Fifi and the Flowertots – Buttercup (UK) (2005)
- Lunar Jim – Ripple (UK) (2006-2007)
- Hana's Helpline – Mrs. Turtle, Mrs. Pig, Mums (2007)
- ToddWorld – Sophie (UK) (2006)
- Horrid Henry – Sour Susan, Miss Lovely, Gorgeous Gurinder, (Note: Credited in Horrid Henry's Most Horrid Album.) Singing Soraya, Goody-Goody Gordon, Stuck-Up Steve, Bossy Bill, Rabid Rebecca, Mrs Crunch, additional voices (2006–2019)
- It's a Big Big World – Burdette (UK) (2007)
- Wakfu – Amelia (2008–present)
- Zigby – Zara, Laurence, Vicky, Celeen, El, Tink (2009)
- The Official BBC Children in Need Medley – Buttercup (2009)
- Team Umizoomi – Geo (UK) (2010)
- The Bopps – Jo Bopp (2010)
- Floopaloo, Where Are You? – Amelia (2011–2014)
- Cloudbabies – Little Star, Moon (2011)
- Lulu Zipadoo – Lulu, Hattie (UK & US Version) (2011)
- Poppy Cat – Zuzu (UK) (2011)
- Toby's Travelling Circus – Toby, Delores, Momo, Li (2012)
- Professor Layton vs. Phoenix Wright: Ace Attorney – Espella Cantabella (2014)
- Kate & Mim-Mim – Valerie, Boomer (UK) (2014–2019)
- Everything's Rosie – Rosie (2015–2017)
- Final Fantasy XIV – Nanamo Ul Namo, Ga Bu, Garuda (2015–present)
- Simon – Patricia, Eva (2017)
- Dennis & Gnasher: Unleashed! – Mrs. Creecher, Anne Finally, Gran (2017)
- Lilybuds – Rose, Bebe (2018)
- Tinpo – Hackpo (2019)
- Xenoblade Chronicles: Definitive Edition – Teelan (2020)
- Daniel Tiger's Neighborhood – Daniel Tiger (UK) (2022)
- Peppa Pig Tales – George Pig, Miss Rabbit, Mummy Rabbit (2022–present)
- Piggy Builders – Dana, Fiona, Kitty (2025)
