= Girl with a Pearl Earring (film) =

2003 drama film by Peter Webber

- UK theatrical release poster
- Directed by: Peter Webber
- Screenplay by: Olivia Hetreed
- Based on: Girl with a Pearl Earring by Tracy Chevalier
- Produced by: Andy Paterson; Anand Tucker
- Starring: Colin Firth; Scarlett Johansson; Tom Wilkinson; Judy Parfitt; Cillian Murphy; Essie Davis; Joanna Scanlan; Alakina Mann
- Cinematography: Eduardo Serra
- Edited by: Kate Evans
- Music by: Alexandre Desplat
- Production companies: UK Film Council; Archer Street Productions; DeLux Productions; Inside Track; Film Fund Luxembourg; Wild Bear Films
- Distributed by: Pathé Distribution (United Kingdom); Lions Gate Films (United States)
- Release dates: 31 August 2003 (Telluride); 16 January 2004 (United Kingdom); 30 January 2004 (United States)
- Running time: 100 minutes
- Countries: United Kingdom; United States; Luxembourg
- Language: English
- Budget: £10 million
- Box office: $31.4 million

Girl with a Pearl Earring is a 2003 drama film directed by Peter Webber from a screenplay by Olivia Hetreed, based on the 1999 novel by Tracy Chevalier. Scarlett Johansson stars as Griet, a young 17th-century servant in the household of the Dutch painter Johannes Vermeer (played by Colin Firth) at the time he painted Girl with a Pearl Earring (1665) in the city of Delft in Holland. Other cast members include Tom Wilkinson, Cillian Murphy, Essie Davis, and Judy Parfitt.

Hetreed read the novel before its publication, and her husband's production company convinced Chevalier to sell the film rights. Initially, the production was to feature Kate Hudson as Griet with Mike Newell directing. Hudson withdrew shortly before filming began, however, and the film was placed on hiatus until the hire of Webber, who re-initiated the casting process.

In his feature film debut, Webber sought to avoid employing traditional characteristics of the period film drama. In a 2003 interview with IGN, he said, "What I was scared of is ending up with something that was like Masterpiece Theatre, [that] very polite Sunday evening BBC kind of thing, and I [was] determined to make something quite different from that ...". Cinematographer Eduardo Serra used distinctive lighting and colour schemes similar to Vermeer's paintings.

Released on 12 December 2003 in North America and on 16 January 2004 in the United Kingdom, Girl with a Pearl Earring earned a worldwide gross of $31.4 million. It garnered a mostly positive critical reception, with critics generally applauding the film's visuals, musical score, and performances while questioning elements of its story. The film was subsequently nominated for ten British Academy Film Awards, three Academy Awards, and two Golden Globe Awards.

== Plot ==
Griet is a shy girl living in the Dutch Republic in 1665. Her father, a Delftware painter, has recently gone blind, rendering him unable to work and leaving his family in a precarious financial situation. Griet is sent to Delft to work as a maid in the household of famed painter Johannes Vermeer and his wife, Catharina. On the way there, she stops momentarily at the compass on the canal bridge leading to the market square.

Griet works diligently and almost wordlessly in the lowest position of a harsh hierarchy. She does her best to adjust, in spite of the unkind treatment from Vermeer's spoiled adolescent daughter, Cornelia. While Griet is on a routine shopping run, a butcher's son, Pieter, is drawn to her. She is slow to return his affection as their relationship develops. As Griet cleans Vermeer's studio, which Catharina never enters, the painter begins to converse with her and encourages her appreciation of painting, light, and colour. He gives her lessons in mixing paints and other tasks while keeping these secret from Catharina, to avoid angering her. In contrast, Vermeer's pragmatic mother-in-law, Maria Thins, sees Griet as useful to Vermeer's career.

Vermeer's rich patron, Pieter van Ruijven, visits the household and notices Griet. He asks if Vermeer will paint Griet alongside him in a commission. Due to van Rujiven's previous scandal that resulted in him impregnating a maid, Vermeer refuses, but agrees to paint a portrait of Griet for him. As he secretly works on the painting, Catharina notices something is amiss. Her growing disdain for the maid becomes apparent, spurred on by van Ruijven's deliberate suggestions of an improper relationship between Vermeer and Griet. A conflicted Griet deals with her growing fascination with Vermeer and his talent while fending off van Ruijven, who attempts to rape her in the courtyard. Later, when Catharina is out for the day, her mother hands Griet her daughter's pearl earrings and asks Vermeer to finish the painting.

At the final painting session, Vermeer pierces Griet's left earlobe so she can wear one of the earrings for the portrait. Tensions heighten when she reacts in pain and Vermeer caresses her face. She runs to Pieter for consolation and distraction from her thoughts of Vermeer. The two make love in a barn. Pieter proposes marriage, but Griet unexpectedly leaves. She returns the earrings to Catharina's mother.

Catharina flies into a rage upon discovering Griet wore her earrings and storms into the studio, accusing her mother of complicity. She demands Vermeer show her the commissioned portrait. Offended by the intimate nature of the painting, Catharina dismisses it as "obscene" and tearfully asks why Vermeer refuses to paint her. When Vermeer responds that she doesn't understand, she tries to destroy the painting in rage, though she is stopped by Vermeer. She banishes Griet from the house, and Vermeer does not object. Griet returns to her parents' home, stopping to stand once again at the compass on the bridge. Later, Griet receives a visit at her parents' home from Vermeer's cook, Tanneke, who brings a gift: the blue headscarf Griet wore in the painting, wrapped around Catharina's pearl earrings.

In the final shot, the camera zooms out from the earring to reveal the full real-life painting, Girl with a Pearl Earring.

== Cast ==
- Colin Firth as Johannes Vermeer
- Scarlett Johansson as Griet
- Tom Wilkinson as Pieter van Ruijven
- Judy Parfitt as Maria Thins
- Cillian Murphy as Pieter
- Essie Davis as Catharina Vermeer
- Joanna Scanlan as Tanneke, the cook
- Alakina Mann as Cornelia Vermeer
- Chris McHallem as Griet's Father
- Gabrielle Reidy as Griet's Mother
- Rollo Weeks as Frans
- Anna Popplewell as Maertge
- Geoff Bell as Paul The Butcher
- John McEnery as Apothecary

== Production ==
=== Development ===
Vermeer's original painting, Girl with a Pearl Earring from 1665

The production of Girl with a Pearl Earring began in 1999, when screenwriter Olivia Hetreed gained access to Tracy Chevalier's novel Girl with a Pearl Earring shortly before its publication in August. (Note: Screenwriter Olivia Hetreed gained early access to the book because she shared the same agent as Chevalier, and read it in two hours.) The novel had not yet become a best-seller, but several groups were beginning to show interest. Hetreed loved the character of Griet and "her determination to be free in a world where that was almost impossible for a girl from her background". Anand Tucker and Hetreed's husband Andy Paterson – both producers with the small British studio Archer Street Films – approached the novel's author, Tracy Chevalier, for a film adaptation. Chevalier agreed, believing that a British studio would help resist Hollywood's urge "to sex up the film". She stipulated that their adaptation avoid having the main characters consummate their relationship. Paterson and Tucker promised to "replicate the 'emotional truth' of the story", and Chevalier did not seek to retain control during the film's creative process, though she briefly considered adapting it herself.

Hetreed worked closely with Tucker and Webber to adapt the book, explaining that "working with them on drafts helped me to concentrate on what the film would be, rather than how beautifully I could make a line work". Her first draft was closest to the source material and it slowly "developed its own character" through rewrites. She avoided using a voiceover, which was present in the novel, "partly because it would make it very literary". Instead, she focused on conveying Griet's thoughts visually – for example, in her adaptation Griet and Vermeer inspect the camera obscura together under his cloak amidst sexual tension; whereas, in the novel Griet views it alone immediately after him and enjoys the lasting warmth and scent he leaves.

The novel maximises the few known facts of Vermeer's life, which Hetreed described as "little pillars sticking up out of the dust of history". To learn more about the artist, the screenwriter researched Dutch society in the 17th-century, talked to artist friends about painting, and interviewed a Victoria & Albert Museum art historian who had restored the original artwork. Hetreed stayed in close contact with Chevalier, and the two became so close near the end of the production that they presented a master class together on screenwriting.

=== Casting ===
Originally, the American actress Kate Hudson was cast as Griet, having successfully pursued the role from the film's producers. In September 2001, however, Hudson pulled out four weeks before filming began, officially due to "creative differences". Hudson's decision scuppered the production and led to the loss of financial support from the production company Intermedia. It also resulted in the withdrawal of Mike Newell as director and Ralph Fiennes as Vermeer; Fiennes left the project to work on his 2002 film Maid in Manhattan. Due to this incident, The Guardian reported that it "now seems unlikely that the film will ever be made".

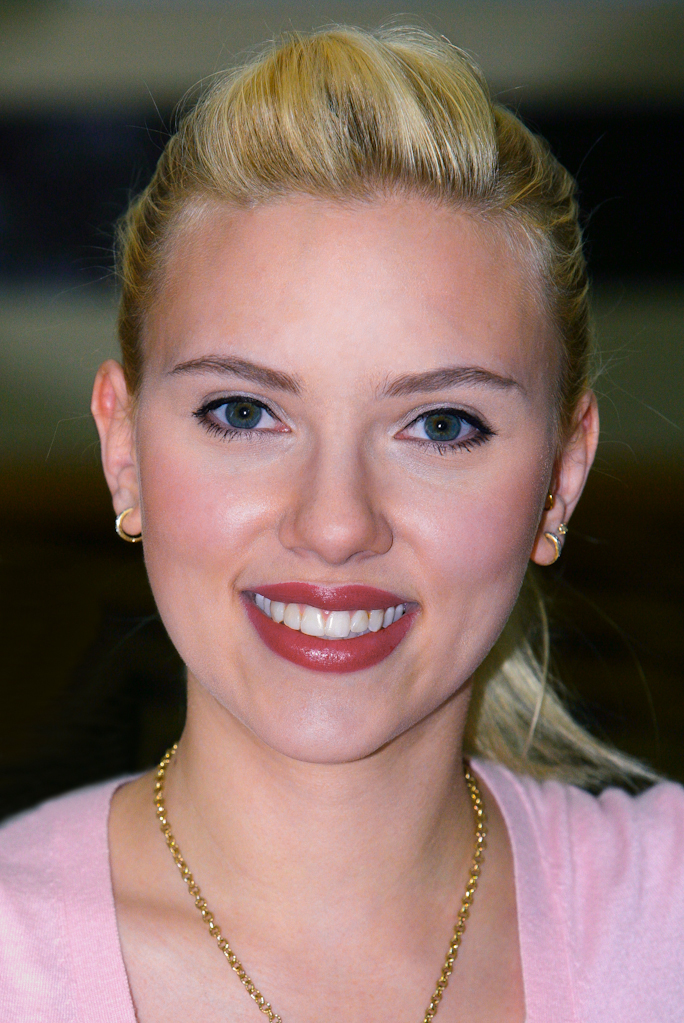
Scarlett Johansson bleached her eyebrows to better resemble the subject of Vermeer's painting.

Production started again later that year when the producers hired the relatively unknown British television director Peter Webber to head the project, despite his not having directed a feature film before. Tucker and Paterson already knew Webber from several earlier projects; the director discovered the project by accident after visiting their office, where he noticed a poster of Vermeer's work and began discussing it. Webber read the script and described it as being "about creativity and the link between art and money and power and sex in some strange unholy mixture". Characterising it as a "coming of age" story with a "fascinating dark undertow", Webber deliberately did not read the book prior to filming, as he was concerned about being influenced by it, opting instead to rely on the script and the period.

The casting of Griet was Webber's first major step and led to interviews with 150 girls before Webber chose the 17-year-old actress Scarlett Johansson. He felt that she "just stood out. She had something distinctive about her." Johansson seemed very modern to Webber, but he believed this was a positive attribute, realising "that what would work was to take this intelligent, zippy girl and repress all that". The actress finished filming Lost in Translation immediately before arriving on set in Luxembourg, and consequently prepared little for the role. She considered the script "beautifully written" and the character "very touching", but did not read the book because she thought it would be better to approach the story with a "clean slate."

After the hiring of Johansson, other major casting decisions quickly followed, beginning with the addition of English actor Colin Firth as Vermeer. Firth and Webber, both of a similar age and background, spent significant time discussing Vermeer's personality and lifestyle in the period leading up to the beginning of filming. While researching the role, Firth realised that Vermeer was "incredibly elusive as an artist". As a result, unlike Webber and Johansson, Firth chose to read the book to gain a better grasp of a man of whom little information existed on his private life. Firth sought to "invent" the character and discover his motivations, and ultimately identified with the artist for having a private space in the midst of a bustling family. Firth also studied painting techniques and visited museums carrying Vermeer works.

After Firth, Webber's next casting decision was Tom Wilkinson as the patron Pieter van Ruijven, who was hired in late 2002. He was soon joined by Judy Parfitt as Vermeer's domineering mother-in-law, and Essie Davis, who portrayed Vermeer's wife Catharina. The Australian daughter of an artist, Davis did not believe her character was the film's "bad guy", as "[Catharina] has a certain role to play for you to want Griet and Vermeer to be involved". Cillian Murphy, known for his recent role in 28 Days Later, was hired as Pieter, Griet's butcher love interest. Murphy, taking on his first period film role, was interested in serving as a foil to Firth's Vermeer, and representing the "ordinary" world that Griet seeks to avoid upon her meeting the artist. Other cast members included Joanna Scanlan as the maid Tanneke, as well as the young actresses Alakina Mann and Anna Popplewell as Vermeer's daughters, Cornelia and Maertge, respectively.

=== Filming ===
During preproduction, Webber and cinematographer Eduardo Serra studied the period's artwork and discussed the different moods they wanted to create for each scene. The director was a lover of the Stanley Kubrick period drama Barry Lyndon, but knew that Girl With a Pearl Earring would be different; unlike the former film's "elaborate and expensive set pieces", Webber's production was to be "about the intimate relationships within a single household". He was not seeking to create a historically accurate biographical film of Vermeer; Webber sought to direct a period film that avoided being "overly slavish" to characteristics of the genre, desiring instead to "bring the film to life" and have viewers "be able almost to smell the meat in the market". Webber employed little dialogue and drew inspiration from the "quiet, tense, mysterious, transcendent world" of Vermeer's paintings. The director also made a conscious effort to slow the pace of the film, hoping that by "slowing things down [we could] create these moments in between the dialogue that were full of emotion. And the more silent the film became, the closer it seemed to be to the condition of those Vermeer paintings and the closer it seemed to capture some kind of truth."

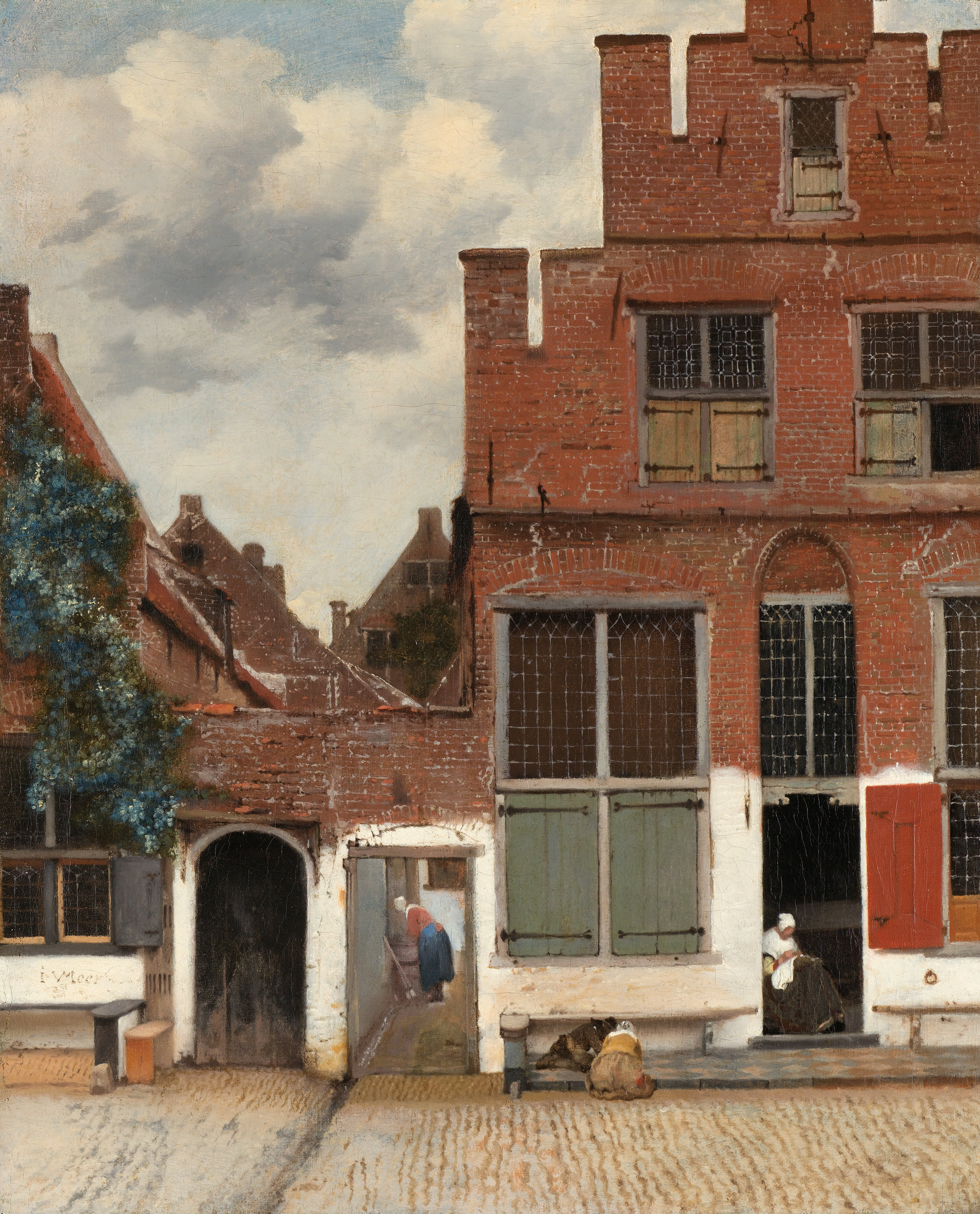
The filmmakers studied Vermeer works such as The Little Street

The film was budgeted at £10 million. While it is set in Delft, the film was primarily shot in Amsterdam, Belgium, and Luxembourg. Chevalier later remarked that Webber and Serra "needed absolute control of the space and light they worked with – something they could never achieve by shutting down a busy Delft street for an hour or two". Only a few exterior shots were filmed in Delft.

Webber hired Ben van Os as his production designer because "he wasn't intimidated by the period obligations. He was much more interested in story and character." For inspiration in constructing the film's sets, Webber and van Os studied the works of Vermeer and other artists of the period, such as Gerard ter Borch. Set designer Todd van Hulzen said the goal was to "reflect that quiet, sober, almost moralizing ethos that you see in Dutch paintings". They built Vermeer's house on one of Luxembourg's largest film soundstages, a three-story set where they designed rooms that were meant to convey a lack of privacy. According to van Os, the film was about "being observed", so they intended Griet to always feel that she was being watched. In addition, they built two other interior sets to represent the homes of Griet and van Ruijven – Griet's home possessed Calvinistic characteristics while van Ruijven's contained mounted animals to reflect his "predatory nature". The Mauritshuis museum made a high-resolution photograph of the actual painting, which was then shot on a rostrum camera to be used in the film.

According to Webber, Serra "was obsessed with reproducing the amazing use of light by the artists of that period, and most particularly Vermeer's use of it". To reflect the "magical luminosity" of Vermeer's artwork, Serra employed diffused lighting and different film stock when filming scenes in the artist's studio. Webber and Serra did not want to be too reliant on Vermeer's aesthetic, however; they wanted audiences to come away focusing their praise on its story, not its visuals.

=== Costume design and make-up ===
In desiring to avoid stereotypes of the costume drama, Webber costumed his actors in simple outfits he termed "period Prada", rather than use the ruffles and baggy costumes common for the era. The intent was to "take the real clothes from the period and reduce them to their essence". Costume designer Dien van Straalen explored London and Holland markets in search for period fabrics, including curtains and slipcovers. For Griet, van Straalen employed "pale colors for Scarlett Johansson to give her the drab look of a poor servant girl." Firth was also outfitted simply, as Vermeer was not rich. Van Straalen created more elaborate costumes for Wilkinson, as van Ruijven was to her "a peacock strutting around with his money".

Make-up and hair designer Jenny Shircore desired that Griet appear without make-up, so Johansson was given very little; rather, Shircore focused on maintaining the actress' skin as "milky, thick and creamy", and bleached her eyebrows. They gave Davis as Catharina a "very simple Dutch hairstyle", which they learned from studying drawings and prints of the period.

=== Music ===
The musical score for Girl with a Pearl Earring was written by the French composer Alexandre Desplat. Webber decided to hire Desplat after hearing a score he had composed for a Jacques Audiard film. Webber explained, "He had a sense of restraint and a sense of lyricism that I liked. I remember the first time I saw the cue where Griet opens the shutters. He was really describing what the light was doing, articulating that in a musical sphere." Desplat was then known primarily for scoring films in his native language.

The score employs strings, piano, and woodwinds, with a central theme featuring a variety of instrumental forms. Desplat created a melody that recurs throughout the film, stating in a later interview that "it evolves and it's much more flowing with a very gentle theme that's haunting". The score, his career breakthrough, gained him international attention and garnered him further film projects. The soundtrack was released in 2004; it earned a nomination for the Golden Globe Award for Best Original Score, helping increase Desplat's name recognition in Hollywood.

Desplat's work also garnered positive reviews. The New York Times described it as a " gorgeous score ...[which] brushes in a haunted gloom that gives the picture life where none seems to exist", whilst Boston.com said it "burbles with elegant baroque minimalism". Empire magazine called his score "a supremely elegant work" that "creates a captivating atmosphere of cautious emotion and wonderment, the true highlight being 'Colours in the Clouds', so simply majestic that it really captures the heart of the story".

=== Editing ===
In the interest of shortening the adaptation, approximately one-third of the story was eventually edited out; entire subplots and characters were removed. Before becoming a screenwriter Hetreed worked as an editor, and credits this experience for knowing "about structure and what you need to say and what you can leave out. I am a big enthusiast for leaving things out." She focused the story on the relationship between Griet and Vermeer, deciding what other storylines were "distracting and had to be jettisoned. Before editing, there was great stuff there, but Peter was fantastically ruthless". Changes from the novel did not bother Chevalier, who felt that as a result the film gained "a focused, driven plot and a sumptuous visual feast".

== Themes and analysis ==
According to Webber, Girl with a Pearl Earring is "more than just a quaint little film about art" but is concerned with themes of money, sex, repression, obsession, power, and the human heart. Laura M. Sager Eidt, in her book Writing and Filming the Painting: Ekphrasis in Literature and Film, asserts that the film deviates significantly from the source material and emphasises a "socio-political dimension that is subtler in the novel". Girl with a Pearl Earring, Sager Eidt says, "shifts its focus from a young girl's evolving consciousness to the class and power relations in the story".

In Film England: Culturally English Filmmaking Since the 1990s, Andrew Higson notes that the film overcomes the novel's "subjective narration" device by having the camera stay fixed on Griet for much of the film. But, Higson says, "no effort is made to actually render her point of view as the point of view of the film or the spectator".

Vermeer channels Griet's sexual awakening into his painting, with the piercing of her ear and his directives to her posing being inherently sexual. In the opinion of psychologist Rosemary Rizq, the pearl Griet dons is a metaphor, something which normally would convey wealth and status. But, when worn by Griet, the pearl is also a directive to the audience to look at the "psychological potential within" her erotic, unconsummated bond with Vermeer, unclear up to that point if it is real or not.

The film incorporates seven of Vermeer's paintings into its story. (Note: These paintings were Woman with a Water Jug, View of Delft, The Milkmaid, The Girl with the Wine Glass, Girl with a Pearl Earring, The Concert, and Woman with a Pearl Necklace.) Thomas Leitch, in Film Adaptation and Its Discontents: From Gone with the Wind to The Passion of the Christ, writes that while Chevalier's Griet describes ten Vermeer paintings (without naming them), Webber's film avoids "show[ing] an external world that looks like a series of Vermeer paintings", as this would have been a trivialisation of the artist's achievements. Leitch adds the director "compromises by showing far fewer actual Vermeer paintings than Chevalier's Griet describes but lingering longer over the visual particulars of the studio in which he creates them".

== Release ==
=== Box office ===
Girl With a Pearl Earring's world premiere occurred at the Telluride Film Festival on 31 August 2003. In North America it was distributed by Lions Gate Entertainment. The film was limited in release to seven cinemas on 12 December 2003, landing in 32nd place for the week with $89,472. Lions Gate slowly increased its release to a peak of 402 cinemas by 6 February 2004. Its total domestic gross was $11,670,971.

The film was released in the United Kingdom on 16 January 2004 by Pathé Films. In its opening week, the film finished in tenth place with a total of £384,498 from 106 cinemas. In the UK and Ireland, the film finished in 14th place for the year with a total box office gross of £3.84 million. It had a worldwide gross of $31,466,789.

=== Home media ===
In the US, the Girl With a Pearl Earring DVD was released on 4 May 2004 by Lions Gate. The Region 2 DVD's release on 31 May 2004 included audio commentaries from Webber, Paterson, Hetreed, and Chevalier; a featurette on "The Art of Filmmaking"; and eight deleted scenes.

== Reception ==
"In paring the novel down, he's taken the fire out of the fusion of art and eroticism which powers Griet's and Vermeer's feeling for one another. For all the sunlight that shines into his studio, there's no air – the sense of two people breathing easily in one another's company. And the film needs that. Without it, for all Webber's fetish for exquisite detail, it's a strangely remote experience. You come away soothed by its beauty. But later, when its tranquillising effects wear off, you wonder about the risks not taken and the opportunities missed."

— Sandra Hall in a review for The Sydney Morning Herald

Critical reception of Girl With a Pearl Earring was mostly positive, with reviewers positively emphasizing the film's visuals, musical score, and performances while questioning elements of its story. The review aggregator Rotten Tomatoes calculated a 73% approval rating based on 179 reviews, with an average score of 6.90/10. The website reported the critical consensus as "visually arresting, but the story could be told with a bit more energy". Metacritic assigned the film a weighted average score of 72 out of 100, based on 37 critics, indicating "generally favorable" reviews. Historian Alex von Tunzelmann, writing for The Guardian, praised the film for its "sumptuous design and incredible Vermeerish appearance" but felt that "it's a bit too much like watching paint dry". In The Observer, Philip French referred to the film as "quiet, intelligent and well-acted" and believed that "most people will be impressed by, and carry away in their mind's eye, the film's appearance ... [Serra, van Os, and van Straalen] have given the movie a self-conscious beauty".

The BBC's review, written by Susan Hodgetts, described the film as "a superior British costume drama that expertly mixes art history with romantic fiction", which would appeal to "anyone who likes serious, intelligent drama and gentle erotic tension". Hodgetts said that both Firth and Johansson gave "excellent" performances and did "a grand job of expressing feelings and emotions without the use of much dialogue, and the picture is the better for it". Elvis Mitchell of The New York Times called the film an "earnest, obvious melodrama with no soul, filled with the longing silences that come after a sigh". Mitchell did however laud its cinematography, production design, and musical score, as did the Film Journal International's Erica Abeel. Despite praising its visuals, Abeel criticized Girl with a Pearl Earring for being "a chick flick dressed up in Old Master clothes" and for failing "to render Griet's growing artistic sensibility dramatically credible". She cited its melodramatic villains as another failing, but concluded that it was "to Johansson's credit that she alone pulls something plausible out of her character".

Sandra Hall of The Sydney Morning Herald praised Webber's ability to "build individual moments [such as] the crackle of a bed-sheet which has grown an ice overcoat after being hung out to dry in the wintry air", but opined that he failed to "invest these elegant reproductions of the art of the period with the emotional charge you've been set up to expect". Griet and Vermeer's relationship, Hall wrote, lacked "the sense of two people breathing easily in one another's company". Owen Gleiberman, writing for Entertainment Weekly, remarked that Girl with a Pearl Earring "brings off something that few dramas about artists do. It gets you to see the world through new – which is to say, old – eyes". Gleiberman added that while Johansson is silent for most of the film, "the interplay on her face of fear, ignorance, curiosity, and sex is intensely dramatic". In Sight & Sound, David Jays wrote that "Johansson's marvellous performance builds on the complex innocence of her screen presence (Ghost World, Lost in Translation)". Jays concluded his review by praising Webber and Serra's ability to "deftly deploy daylight, candle and shadow, denying our desire to see clearly just as Vermeer refuses to explicate the situations in his paintings. The film's scenarios may be unsurprising, but Webber's solemn evocation of art in a grey world gives his story an apt, unspoken gravity."

=== Accolades ===
Award	Category	Recipients	Result
Academy Awards	Best Art Direction	Ben van Os	Nominated
Academy Awards	Best Cinematography	Eduardo Serra	Nominated
Academy Awards	Best Costume Design	Dien van Straalen	Nominated
Art Directors Guild	Excellence in Production Design for a Period Film	Ben van Os, Christina Schaffer	Nominated
British Academy Film Awards	Best British Film		Nominated
British Academy Film Awards	Best Adapted Screenplay	Olivia Hetreed	Nominated
British Academy Film Awards	Best Actress	Scarlett Johansson	Nominated
British Academy Film Awards	Best Actress in a Supporting Role	Judy Parfitt	Nominated
British Academy Film Awards	Best Art Direction	Ben van Os	Nominated
British Academy Film Awards	Best Cinematography	Eduardo Serra	Nominated
British Academy Film Awards	Best Costume Design	Dien van Straalen	Nominated
British Academy Film Awards	Best Makeup & Hair	Jenny Shircore	Nominated
British Academy Film Awards	Best Score	Alexandre Desplat	Nominated
British Academy Film Awards	Outstanding Debut	Peter Webber	Nominated
British Independent Film Awards	Best Achievement in Production		Nominated
British Independent Film Awards	Best Actress	Scarlett Johansson	Nominated
British Independent Film Awards	Douglas Hickox Award (Debut Director)	Peter Webber	Nominated
British Society of Cinematographers	Best Cinematography Award	Eduardo Serra	Nominated
Camerimage	Bronze Frog	Eduardo Serra	Won
Camerimage	Golden Frog	Eduardo Serra	Nominated
European Film Awards	Best Cinematographer	Eduardo Serra	Won
European Film Awards	Best Composer	Alexandre Desplat	Nominated
Golden Globe Awards	Best Actress – Motion Picture Drama	Scarlett Johansson	Nominated
Golden Globe Awards	Best Original Score	Alexandre Desplat	Nominated
Los Angeles Film Critics Association Awards	Best Cinematography	Eduardo Serra	Won
San Diego Film Critics Societys	Best Cinematography	Eduardo Serra	Won
San Sebastián International Film Festival	Best Cinematography	Eduardo Serra	Won

== See also ==
- 2003 in film
- Girl with a Pearl Earring (play)
- List of paintings by Johannes Vermeer

== Bibliography ==
- Costanzo Cahir, Linda (2006). Literature into Film: Theory and Practical Approaches. McFarland & Company. ISBN 978-0-7864-2597-6.
- Higson, Andrew (2011). Film England: Culturally English Filmmaking Since the 1990s. I.B. Tauris. ISBN 978-1-84885-454-3.
- Leitch, Thomas (2009). Film Adaptation and Its Discontents: From Gone with the Wind to The Passion of the Christ. Johns Hopkins University Press. ISBN 978-0-8018-9271-4.
- Rizq, Rosemary (August 2005). "Finding the self in mind: Vermeer and reflective function". Psychodynamic Practice. 11 (3): 255–268. doi:10.1080/14753630500232156. S2CID 144813929.
- Sager Eidt, Laura M. (2008). Writing and Filming the Painting: Ekphrasis in Literature and Film. Amsterdam: Rodopi. ISBN 978-90-420-2457-1.
- Neumeyer, David (2013). "Film II". In Shephard, Tim; Leonard, Anne (eds.). The Routledge Companion to Music and Visual Culture. Routledge. ISBN 978-0-415-62925-6.
