= The Roman Mysteries =

Series of children's books by Caroline Lawrence

- Book 1 in the series
- The Thieves of Ostia; The Secrets of Vesuvius; The Pirates of Pompeii; The Assassins of Rome; The Dolphins of Laurentum; The Twelve Tasks of Flavia Gemina; The Enemies of Jupiter; The Gladiators from Capua; The Colossus of Rhodes; The Fugitive from Corinth; The Sirens of Surrentum; The Charioteer of Delphi; The Slave-Girl from Jerusalem; The Beggar of Volubilis; The Scribes from Alexandria; The Prophet from Ephesus; The Man from Pomegranate Street
- Author: Caroline Lawrence
- Illustrator: Fred van Deelen, Peter Sutton, Richard Carr
- Country: United Kingdom
- Genre: Historical, detective fiction
- Publisher: Orion
- Media type: Print (hardback & paperback)

The Roman Mysteries is a series of historical novels for children by Caroline Lawrence. The first book, The Thieves of Ostia, was published in 2001, and the seventeenth and final book, The Man from Pomegranate Street, in 2009. The series has sold over a million copies in the UK and has been translated into 14 languages. It was followed by a sequel series, a number of "mini-mysteries", a spin-off series, and several companion titles. The BBC produced a television adaptation in 2007 and 2008.

The books take place in the ancient Roman Empire during the reign of the Emperor Titus. They follow four children who solve mysteries and have adventures in Ostia Antica, Rome, Greece, and beyond: Flavia, a rich Roman girl who lives in Ostia; Nubia, a freed slave girl from Nubia in North Africa; Jonathan, a Jewish/Christian boy; and Lupus, an orphaned mute beggar boy.

== Characters ==
=== The four detectives ===
- Flavia Gemina: A wealthy Roman girl, daughter of a sea captain, Marcus Flavius Geminus
- Jonathan ben Mordecai: A kind but pessimistic Jewish/Christian boy, Flavia's neighbour
- Nubia (birth name: Shepenwepet): A Nubian girl, a freedwoman (former slave of Flavia), a talented musician and good with animals
- Lupus (birth name: Lukos): A mute Greek beggar boy with a tragic past; he communicates using a wax tablet and stylus

=== Other characters ===
- Marcus Flavius Geminus: Flavia's father, a sea captain
- Mordecai ben Ezra: Jonathan's father, a doctor
- Miriam bat Mordecai: Jonathan's older sister
- Aristo: Greek tutor of the children

=== Characters based on historical persons ===
- Pliny the Elder, admiral of the Misenum fleet and an accomplished natural historian.
- Pliny the Younger, nephew of the Elder
- Titus, Emperor of Rome
- Berenice of Cilicia, Titus' exiled Jewish mistress
- Domitian, Titus' younger brother
- Gaius Suetonius Tranquillus, the famous historian, who appears as a young man initially betrothed to Flavia
- Gaius Valerius Flaccus, the poet, who appears in several novels as a teenaged man, and a love interest of Flavia's
- Titus Flavius Josephus, famous Jewish historian
- Domitia Longina, Domitian's wife
- Julia Flavia, Titus' daughter

== The Roman Mysteries novels ==
=== Main novels ===
1. The Thieves of Ostia (2001)
2. The Secrets of Vesuvius (2001)
3. The Pirates of Pompeii (2002)
4. The Assassins of Rome (2002)
5. The Dolphins of Laurentum (2003)
6. The Twelve Tasks of Flavia Gemina (2003)
7. The Enemies of Jupiter (2003)
8. The Gladiators from Capua (2004)
9. The Colossus of Rhodes (2005)
10. The Fugitive from Corinth (2005)
11. The Sirens of Surrentum (2006)
12. The Charioteer of Delphi (2006)
13. The Slave-Girl from Jerusalem (2007)
14. The Beggar of Volubilis (2008)
15. The Scribes from Alexandria (2008)
16. The Prophet from Ephesus (2009)
17. The Man from Pomegranate Street (2009)

=== Omnibus editions ===
1. The Roman Mysteries Omnibus I: The Thieves of Ostia, the Secrets of Vesuvius and the Pirates of Pompeii.
2. The Roman Mysteries Omnibus II: The Assassins of Rome, the Dolphins of Laurentum, the Twelve Tasks of Flavia Gemina.
3. The Roman Mysteries Omnibus III: The Enemies of Jupiter, the Gladiators from Capua, the Colossus of Rhodes.

=== Special features ===
Each of the novels has at least one map of the area covered in the story, sometimes also plans or diagrams; these are by Richard Russell Lawrence. The chapters are called scrolls, after the rolls of papyrus which were Roman 'books', and are numbered with Roman numerals. The glossary explaining Roman terms is called "Aristo's Scroll", after Flavia's tutor, and the author's note, which separates fact from fiction, is called "The Last Scroll".

== Mini-Mysteries ==
1. Bread and Circuses (short story published in 2003 in The Mammoth Book of Roman Whodunits); re-published in a shorter version as a novella, titled The Code of Romulus for World Book Day in April 2007)
2. Trimalchio's Feast and other mini-mysteries (2007)
3. The Legionary from Londinium and other mini-mysteries (2010)

== Companion books ==
1. The First Roman Mysteries Quiz Book
2. The Second Roman Mysteries Quiz Book
3. The Roman Mysteries Treasury (2007)
4. From Ostia to Alexandria with Flavia Gemina: Travels with Flavia Gemina (2008)

== The Roman Quests (sequel series) ==
1. Escape from Rome (2016)
2. The Archers of Isca (2016)
3. Death in the Arena (2017)
4. Return to Rome (2018)

The Roman Quests is a sequel series to The Roman Mysteries, set in Roman Britain, ten years after the epilogue of The Man from Pomegranate Street. The series follows a new set of child detectives: the Roman siblings Juba, Fronto and Ursula, and a British girl called Bouda. The books reintroduce Jonathan's nephews, who were babies at the end of The Roman Mysteries. The original four detectives make appearances as adults.

=== Sequel series development ===
In 2008 a sequel trilogy for young adults was proposed, with the main characters being Jonathan's 14-year-old orphaned twin nephews. The stories were to be partly set in Roman Britain. The first book was to be published in March 2010. The working title for the trilogy was The Flavian Trilogy, with individual books being called "Brother of Jackals", "Companion of Owls" and "Prey of Lions". The content was deemed too mature for the Roman Mysteries brand; Caroline Lawrence reworked the idea for younger readers and instead wrote The Roman Quests.

== The Roman Mystery Scrolls (spin-off series) ==
1. The Sewer Demon (2012)
2. The Poisoned Honey Cake (2012)
3. The Thunder Omen (2013)
4. The Two-Faced God (2013)

The Roman Mystery Scrolls is a spin-off series that follows Threptus, an 8-year-old Ostian beggar boy who makes appearances in the final Roman Mystery, The Man from Pomegranate Street, and the final short story in The Legionary from Londinium and other mini-mysteries. The series is aimed at younger readers than the original series.

== TV series ==
The BBC produced a television series based on the books, entitled Roman Mysteries. The first season was broadcast in 2007, the second season in 2008.
