= Roman Mysteries (TV series) =

British children's television series (2007–2008)

- The Roman Mysteries Title Card
- Genre: Children's; Action; Adventure; Period
- Created by: Caroline Lawrence
- Starring: Eli Machover; Rebekah Brookes-Murrell; Harry Stott; Francesca Isherwood
- Composer: Cross Wyre
- Country of origin: United Kingdom
- Original language: English
- No. of series: 2
- No. of episodes: 20

Production
- Executive producers: Jon East; David Hunt; Keith Littler
- Producers: David Ball; Martyn Auty
- Production locations: Malta; Tunisia; Bulgaria
- Editor: Adam Green
- Running time: 60 minutes (30 minutes per episode)

Original release
- Network: BBC One, CBBC
- Release: 8 May 2007 – 2 September 2008

Roman Mysteries is a television series based on the series of children's historical novels by Caroline Lawrence. It aired on CBBC from 2007 to 2008. It is reportedly the most expensive British children's TV series to date at £1 million per hour.

The series began filming in June 2006 in Malta, Tunisia and Bulgaria, and was first broadcast from 8 May 2007. The series is divided into "scrolls", each based on one book, starting with The Secrets of Vesuvius. The stories are told in the same order as the book series, except for book 6, The Twelve Tasks of Flavia Gemina, which is transposed to the second series. Books 11 and 12 were not adapted, and the series ends with the adaptation of Book 13. Each scroll consists of two half-hour episodes. The first scroll guest-starred Simon Callow as Pliny the Elder.

On 22 May 2007, after just two episodes, Anne Foy announced on CBBC on BBC One that the show has been postponed due to recent events in the news and would return later in the year on CBBC on BBC One. Since "The Pirates of Pompeii" was about children being kidnapped, the postponement was most likely due to the then recent disappearance of Madeleine McCann. On 19 June the series began broadcasting again from the beginning.

Filming for the second series began on 13 August 2007 and the second series was first broadcast from 8 July 2008.

The series has been successful internationally, and both series have been released on DVD.

== Characters ==
- Flavia, played by Francesca Isherwood
- Nubia, played by Rebekah Brookes-Murrell
- Jonathan, played by Eli Machover
- Lupus, played by Harry Stott
- Polla Pulchra, played by Millie Binks
- Marcus, Flavia's father, played by Eoin McCarthy
- Gaius, Flavia's uncle, played by Eoin McCarthy
- Mordecai, Jonathan's father, played by Stephen Mapes
- Miriam, Jonathan's sister, Gaius's wife, played by Natasha Barrero
- Caudex, played by Jamie Baughan (Series 2)
- Venalicius, played by Richard Ridings (Series 1)
- Aristo, played by Christopher Harper (Series 2)

== Episodes ==
=== Series overview ===
| Series | Episodes | UK airdate | |
| Series | Episodes | First episode | Last episode |
|---|---|---|---|
| 1 | 10 | 8 May 2007 | 21 August 2007 |
| 2 | 10 | 8 July 2008 | 2 September 2008 |

=== Series 1 (2007) ===
| No. overall | No. in series | Title | Directed by | Written by | Original release date | UK viewers (millions) |
|---|---|---|---|---|---|---|
| 1 | 1 | "The Secrets of Vesuvius Part 1" | Paul Marcus | Olivia Hetreed | 8 May 2007 | N/A |
Flavia's father sends her and her three friends away from the dangers of Ostia to the safety of Pompeii. However, the mystery of Mount Vesuvius casts an ominous shadow over the city.
| 2 | 2 | "The Secrets of Vesuvius Part 2" | Paul Marcus | Olivia Hetreed | 15 May 2007 | N/A |
The full force of Vesuvius is unleashed in this second part as Flavia and her friends convince Admiral Pliny of the danger of Mount Vesuvius. But is there anything that he and his fleet can do against the might of a giant volcano?
| 3 | 3 | "The Pirates of Pompeii Part 1" | Paul Marcus | Olivia Hetreed | 3 July 2007 | N/A |
The children deal with the aftermath of a catastrophic volcanic eruption. The eruption of Mount Vesuvius has left a trail of destruction. In the chaos of the refugee camp, Flavia is shocked to discover that children are being abducted. The mystery deepens further with the arrival of the enigmatic Felix.
| 4 | 4 | "The Pirates of Pompeii Part 2" | Paul Marcus | Olivia Hetreed | 10 July 2007 | N/A |
The four friends get caught up in a kidnapping in this second part. Flavia and friends find themselves in great peril as they get a little too close to a kidnapping plot. The children must all pull together or face a lifetime of slavery.
| 5 | 5 | "The Assassins of Rome Part 1" | Paul Marcus | Alison Hume | 17 July 2007 | N/A |
The drama continues as Jonathan gets embroiled in a plot to assassinate Emperor Titus. For Jonathan, birthdays are no cause for celebration and true to form this happy day is marred by the arrival of his uncle Simeon. After upsetting his friends, Jonathan is tricked into going to Rome and gets entangled in a plot to assassinate Emperor Titus.
| 6 | 6 | "The Assassins of Rome Part 2" | Paul Marcus | Alison Hume | 24 July 2007 | N/A |
Jonathan is utterly alone. Plagued by dreams of a Cyclops, confused by speculation that his mother was not killed in the siege of Jerusalem but living in the Golden House of Titus. His friends are desperate to find him and save Titus but with a third assassin on the loose, time is running out.
| 7 | 7 | "The Dolphins of Laurentum Part 1" | Paul Marcus | Olivia Hetreed | 31 July 2007 | N/A |
When Flavia hears of a sunken treasure ship it seems like the ideal way out of her family's sudden poverty. Captain Marcus Flavius Geminus returns from sea but the news is not good; he has lost his ship, his precious cargo, everything. With the family hounded by debt collectors, Flavia and friends are forced to take extreme measures – they go in search of sunken treasure. This time, they may be out of their depth.
| 8 | 8 | "The Dolphins of Laurentum Part 2" | Paul Marcus | Olivia Hetreed | 7 August 2007 | N/A |
While Lupus dives for lost treasure, the shipwreck conceals a nasty surprise! The lure of a quick fortune has attracted others and the repulsive Venalicius makes an unwelcome return. However, the shipwreck is reluctant to give up its treasures easily and has a surprise waiting in the depths. Lupus is no longer alone when he dives.
| 9 | 9 | "The Enemies of Jupiter Part 1" | Paul Marcus | Alison Hume | 14 August 2007 | N/A |
Rome, ravished by a devastating plague is the backdrop to the penultimate episode of what has been an epic series. Emperor Titus has a premonition – When a Prometheus opens Pandora's box, Rome will be devastated. Powerless, he watches as his city is decimated by a great plague. To help unmask this mysterious Prometheus and hopefully end the suffering of his people, he turns to Flavia and her friends.
| 10 | 10 | "The Enemies of Jupiter Part 2" | Paul Marcus | Alison Hume | 21 August 2007 | N/A |
In the last episode of the series, we discover who invited Doctor Mordecai to Rome. There is no time for recriminations as a fast acting poison threatens the life of a loved one. Flavia will have to overcome her numbing fear of snakes if they are to find an antidote. But, will the poisoner have the last word?

=== Series 2 (2008) ===
| No. overall | No. in series | Title | Directed by | Written by | Original release date | UK viewers (millions) |
|---|---|---|---|---|---|---|
| 11 | 1 | "The Gladiators From Capua Part 1" | Marcus D.F. White | Barry Purchese | 1 July 2008 | N/A |
A ship docks at Ostia carrying a team of gladiators, booked to entertain at a private function. Nubia thinks she may have glimpsed her missing brother amongst them. As the children go to the arena, they discover a mystery that endangers the life of the emperor's brother, Domitian.
| 12 | 2 | "The Gladiators From Capua Part 2" | Marcus D.F. White | Barry Purchese | 8 July 2008 | N/A |
Jonathan must face the most frightening of the gladiators and Flavia and Nubia need all their courage to deal with a ravenous beast.
| 13 | 3 | "The Trials of Flavia Gemina Part 1" | Jill Robertson | Robin Mukherjee | 15 July 2008 | N/A |
An abandoned ship washes up in Ostia with a strange cargo. Flavia has another challenge when her father brings home a mysterious woman who he is thinking of marrying. Everything is turned upside down during the comedy and dancing of the Saturnalia festival as Pulchra returns.
| 14 | 4 | "The Trials of Flavia Gemina Part 2" | Jill Robertson | Robin Mukherjee | 22 July 2008 | N/A |
| 15 | 5 | "The Colossus of Rhodes Part 1" | Jill Robertson | Shaun Prendergast | 29 July 2008 | N/A |
Lupus narrowly escapes kidnap by slave traders, but his friend Porcius and other Ostian children are snatched. Flavia and her friends sail after the traders, but their ship faces many dangers that prove they have a traitor right there on board with them.
| 16 | 6 | "The Colossus of Rhodes Part 2" | Jill Robertson | Shaun Prendergast | 5 August 2008 | N/A |
Lupus finds out whether his mother is alive or dead and has a final encounter with Magnus, the mythical figure who masterminds the slave trade.
| 17 | 7 | "The Fugitive from Corinth Part 1" | Marcus D.F. White | Barry Purchese | 12 August 2008 | N/A |
Marcus's life hangs in the balance and Jonathan is left behind to nurse him. Only Nubia has faith that the gentle Aristo, their tutor, could not possibly be behind the attack.
| 18 | 8 | "The Fugitive from Corinth Part 2" | Marcus D.F. White | Barry Purchese | 19 August 2008 | N/A |
The children take a carruca into the hills outside Ostia, in pursuit of the man Flavia thinks has murdered her father.
| 19 | 9 | "The Slave Girl from Jerusalem Part 1" | Jill Robertson | Dom Shaw | 26 August 2008 | N/A |
Flavia has to save Hepzibah, a slave wrongly accused of terrible crimes. Miriam is determined to protect her friend who will deliver the babies she is expecting, and Jonathan has a prophetic dream that someone will die.
| 20 | 10 | "The Slave Girl from Jerusalem Part 2" | Jill Robertson | Dom Shaw | 2 September 2008 | N/A |
Nubia, Lupus, Flavia and Jonathan have to race against the clock to find the evidence that will clear Hepzibah. Meanwhile, the comical drunken Floridius befriends Lupus and does his daft best to help out. A death shatters the group.

== Differences from the books ==
- The children are older.
- Lupus is mute but his tongue has not been cut out.
- Because The Thieves of Ostia was not adapted, the meeting of the children takes place at a different time (just before the eruption of Vesuvius) and under different circumstances.
- In the book The Assassins of Rome, Simeon is dragged off to be tortured but is rescued (by Titus) before he is maimed or blinded as was threatened. In the TV series he is not rescued. Although it was improbable for him ever to have been rescued, this is a major plot-change.
- It is Titus's decision for Susannah to stay.
- Susannah says she did not leave Jerusalem because her father had heart attack, not because of her love for Jonathan the Zealot.
- Jonathan returns home at the end of "The Enemies of Jupiter".
- "The Gladiators of Capua" and "The Fugitive from Corinth" are set in Ostia, rather than Rome and Greece, respectively.
- Pulchra appears in "The Twelve Tasks of Flavia Gemina" in Jonathan's place.
- Aristo is missing from some of the episodes such as the "Secrets of Vesuvius".
- Several minor characters have been omitted or combined for the television episodes.
- In "The Slave Girl from Jerusalem", a new character, Floridius (played by Mark Benton), was introduced for comic relief.
- When bought as a slave, Nubia's head has not been shaved and she is clothed. Flavia's father no longer pays the extra amount demanded for Nubia and the warm reception she then receives from the house cook is turned into one of hostility and rebuke.
- There is a deliberate effort to dumb down the role of adults, with the notable exception of Doctor Mordecai.

== Reception ==
"Roman Mysteries is a tremendous way for younger viewers to learn about ancient history. Set in the Roman Empire in AD79, it is based on a series of novels by Caroline Lawrence that have sold more than a million copies worldwide. It isn't hard to see why – they graft child-friendly adventure on to careful research, and the same care has been taken to transfer them faithfully to the screen with the help of a strong cast and healthy-looking budget. The first episode this afternoon gives a vivid sense of gladiatorial combat, without the risk of children waking up in the middle of the night screaming." The Times

'Impressively staged children's drama – a sort of Rome for pre-teens – about four friends in AD79.' The Independent

'The adventure series set in ancient Rome returns, with some nice acting by the young cast...' The Mail on Sunday

'...you certainly don't have to be a child to enjoy this adventure series set in the days of the Roman Empire and boasting some very decent production values, convincing fight scenes and crucially, good storylines.' East Anglian Times
