= Caroline Lawrence =

English-born American author

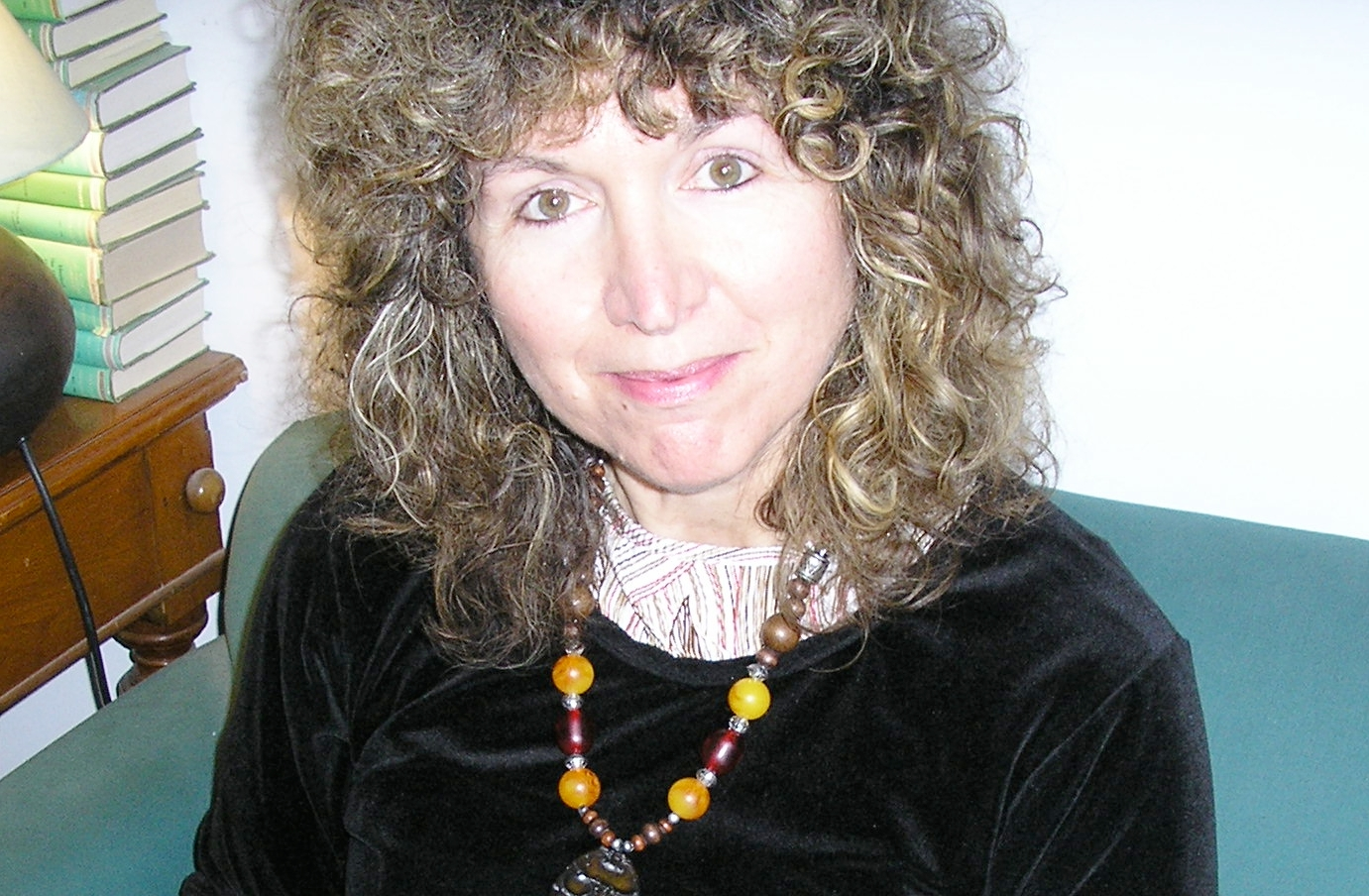
- Born: 1954 (age 71–72); London, England
- Writing career
- Genres: Historical fiction, children's literature, detective fiction
- Notable works: The Roman Mysteries, The P.K. Pinkerton Mysteries

Caroline Lawrence (born 1954) is an English-born American children's author, best known for The Roman Mysteries, a series of historical novels following four child detectives in Ancient Rome. The series has won numerous awards and has been published in many different languages worldwide. Lawrence is also known for her historical mystery series called The P.K. Pinkerton Mysteries (or The Western Mysteries), set in Virginia City, Nevada Territory, in the early 1860s.

== Biography ==
Lawrence was born in London, England. Her American parents returned to the United States shortly afterwards and she grew up in Bakersfield, California, with her younger brother and sister. Her father was Jewish. Her mother was an artist and her father taught French and Drama at a middle school.

When she was twelve, Lawrence's family moved to Stanford University in northern California so that her father could study Linguistics. She afterwards studied classics at University of California, Berkeley, where she won a Marshall Scholarship to the University of Cambridge. There, at Newnham College, she studied classical art and archaeology.

After Cambridge, Lawrence remained in England, and later took a Master of Arts (MA) degree in Hebrew and Jewish studies at University College London. She then taught Latin, French and art at a small London primary school.

In 2000, she wrote The Thieves of Ostia, which was published in 2001, the first in a series of children's mystery-adventure stories set in Ancient Rome, called The Roman Mysteries. The 17 book series has sold over a million copies in the United Kingdom and has been translated into 14 languages. The books were adapted as a TV series by the BBC from 2007–2008. Lawrence went on to write several sequels, spin-offs and companion books.

In 2009, Lawrence won the Classical Association Prize of £5000 (equivalent to £8,000 in 2025) for "a significant contribution to the public understanding of Classics". Lawrence has also worked on the University of Reading's educational website Romans Revealed, creating stories about Roman Britain closely based on archaeological finds. In 2013, she was chosen to be President of JACT (The Joint Association of Classical Teachers) following in the footsteps of Boris Johnson, Bettany Hughes and Paul Cartledge.

Lawrence has a son, Simon, from a previous marriage, and she now lives by the Thames in London with her husband Richard, a graphic designer.

== Bibliography ==
=== The Roman Mysteries ===
1. The Thieves of Ostia (2001)
2. The Secrets of Vesuvius (2001)
3. The Pirates of Pompeii (2002)
4. The Assassins of Rome (2002)
5. The Dolphins of Laurentum (2003)
6. The Twelve Tasks of Flavia Gemina (2003)
7. The Enemies of Jupiter (2003)
8. The Gladiators from Capua (2004)
9. The Colossus of Rhodes (2005)
10. The Fugitive from Corinth (2005)
11. The Sirens of Surrentum (2006)
12. The Charioteer of Delphi (2006)
13. The Slave-girl from Jerusalem (2007)
14. The Beggar of Volubilis (2007)
15. The Scribes from Alexandria (2008)
16. The Prophet from Ephesus (2009)
17. The Man from Pomegranate Street (2009)

=== The Roman Mystery Scrolls ===
1. The Sewer Demon (2012)
2. The Poisoned Honey Cake (2012)
3. The Thunder Omen (2013)
4. The Two-Faced God (2013)

=== The Roman Quests ===
1. Escape from Rome (2016)
2. The Archers of Isca (2016)
3. Death in the Arena (2017)
4. Return to Rome (2018)

Short stories

- The Code of Romulus (World Book day promotion) (2007)
- Trimalchio's Feast and other mini-mysteries (2007)
- The Legionary from Londinium and other mini-mysteries (2010)

Associated non-fiction books include:

- The First Roman Mysteries Quiz Book (2007)
- The Roman Mysteries Treasury (2007)
- From Ostia to Alexandria with Flavia Gemina (2009)

=== The P.K. Pinkerton Mysteries/The Western Mysteries ===
1. The Case of the Deadly Desperados (2011)
2. The Case of the Good-Looking Corpse (2012) (US title: P.K. Pinkerton and the Petrified Man)
3. The Case of the Pistol-Packing Widows (2013)
4. The Case of the Bogus Detective (2015)

=== The Time Travel Diaries ===
1. The Time Travel Diaries (2019)
2. Adventure in Athens (2020)

=== Tales from Virgil's Aeneid ===
1. Night Raid (2014), republished as Nisus and Euryalus: The Night Raid (2025)
2. Queen of the Silver Arrow (2016), republished as Camilla: Queen of the Silver Arrow (2025)

=== Standalone works ===
1. Mystery & Mayhem: Twelve Deliciously Intriguing Mysteries (2016) (contributor, short story anthology)
2. How To Write a Great Story (2019) (non-fiction)
3. Amarantus and his Neighbourhood (2021) (illustrated by Laura Jenkinson-Brown)
4. Aesop's Fables (2022)
5. Pantheon: An Illustrated Handbook to the Greek Gods & Goddesses (2024) (illustrated by Flora Kirk)
