= List of Horrid Henry characters =

The following is a list of characters that appear in Horrid Henry, a British series of children's books written by Francesca Simon. It also includes names from the TV series of the same name and the 2011 film.

== Main characters ==
=== Horrid Henry ===
Horrid Henry is the main character of the series. He wears a horizontally yellow striped light blue T-shirt, blue sewn jeans and green and white shell-toe shoes with yellow soles and laces. He is a very determined and relentless boy who believes that life is unfair, and fights against "the tyranny of adults", mostly anything children hate in a stereotypical view, from vegetables to school. Indeed, Henry's teachers, relatives, and babysitters in the series try their best to avoid him as they admittedly dislike his frequent antics. Henry is often rude, selfish, impatient, hot-tempered, impulsive, arrogant, and hardly ever learns from his mistakes, refusing to acknowledge them. He is also unafraid of telling people how much he hates them right to their faces. However, he is willing to act nice and collude with Moody Margaret and even his younger brother Perfect Peter, but only if it means he will get to have his own way. Because of his young age, however, Henry can get frightened by talk of ghosts or monsters, and is revealed to have a fear of needles in "Horrid Henry's Injection". He is also very imaginative, as he indulges in fantasies, usually transforming into terrifying creatures and attacking the source of his anger, and often has what he thinks is a "spectacularly wonderful idea" ("Eureka moments" in the TV series). In every story, there is something Henry has to get or do (or occasionally avoid doing) and the ensuing chaos is the consequence of this overriding desire. Whenever Henry thinks of a plan it is simply to get his own way, never to make trouble purely for its own sake. He is more often than not seen taking life very seriously and he sincerely believes in what he is doing. It has also been further hinted that deep down, Henry never really means to be horrid, and only acts that way as a wanting to get attention and a need to feel good about himself, particularly when dealing with Peter. He has a club called the Purple Hand Gang (a parody of the Black Hand Gang), with its headquarters being a fort hidden behind branches in Henry's back garden.

According to Francesca Simon, she got the idea for Horrid Henry when Judith Elliott, an editor at Orion Books, asked her to write a story about a horrid child. She also wanted to write about sibling rivalry and families where one child was considered "perfect" and the other "horrid". Henry was drawn with long hair and a striped shirt by Tony Ross in order to make him "recognisable from all angles". Henry is voiced by Lizzie Waterworth in the TV series. In Horrid Henry: The Movie, he is portrayed by Theo Stevenson.

=== Perfect Peter ===
Perfect Peter is Henry's perfect younger brother, with whom he is in conflict. He wears a red jumper with a white shirt underneath, grey trousers, and brown lace-up shoes. He is often referred to as a "worm" or "toad" by Henry. Being quite mature for his age, he exhibits ideal traits including cleanliness, neatness, eating his vegetables, using his fork and knife, good manners and high academic prowess, resulting in his parents favouring him. He also often shows off how good he is, particularly when Henry is being reprimanded for his misbehaviour. Henry gets into trouble when Peter tells Mum or Dad that he has done something wrong, usually with the phrases "Mum/Dad! Henry's being horrid/mean to me!" or "Mum/Dad! Henry called me a worm/a toad/told me to shut up!" Despite being perfect, Peter is also naïve, as he believes Henry's odd stories without question. He can also be desperate for praise and attention and manipulates situations to his advantage. He is also the leader of the Best Boys Club.

In the TV series, Peter is revealed on several occasions to be, in reality, very whiny and spoiled. In addition to being desperate for praise and attention (e.g. getting his toys out just to tidy them again in "Horrid Henry Joins the Best Boys Club"), he tries to take credit for Henry's rare good deeds at times, as shown in episodes such as "Horrid Henry's Perfect Day" and "Horrid Henry: Horrid Headmaster". Peter seldom defies orders or complains about said orders, though as the series progresses, he indeed does defy adults or rules in revenge against Henry or while attempting to frame him. Despite all this, Henry will still help Peter out on occasion, such as rescuing him from a falling shelf in the cellar in "Horrid Henry: Trapped!".

The inspiration for Peter came when Francesca Simon wanted to write about sibling rivalry and families where one child was considered "perfect" and the other "horrid". Tony Ross stated that he found Peter "challenging" to draw due to his innocent posture, so he mostly "put [the character's] hands behind his back and turned the face upwards". Peter is voiced by Emma Tate in the TV series. In Horrid Henry: The Movie, he is portrayed by Ross Marron.

=== Mum ===
Mum is the mother of Henry and Peter. Due to Henry's behaviour, she appears to be quite stressed and irritable, and is strict towards him. She unfairly treats Henry most of the time, sending him to his room and banning him from watching television, pocket money, sweets and the computer, and believing him to have done terrible things that he has not done, as shown in "Perfect Peter's Horrid Day". Mum favours Peter over Henry and constantly praises him on his hard work and achievements, though will discipline him when needed. She usually wears a purple turtleneck cardigan with a pink shirt under it, blue sewn jeans, and magenta ballet pumps. Despite her strictness towards Henry and favouring of Peter, she does care for both her children and wants to know about their well-being. Tony Ross drew Mum with jeans and trainers to differentiate her from other mothers and give her a "trendier" look. In the TV series, Mum works part-time as the assistant manager of a library for Mrs Mossy. She enjoys reading and fashion and is interested in beauty products like perfume. She also likes going in the cosmetics store "I'm A Lady". Mum is shown to be quite close to her sister, Rich-Aunt Ruby, though she is slightly annoyed by Ruby's wealth. She is voiced by Tamsin Heatley in the TV series, except for the episode "Horrid Henry's School Trip", where she is voiced by Sue Elliott-Nichols. In Horrid Henry: The Movie, she is portrayed by Siobhan Hayes.

=== Dad ===
Silly Simon is the father of Henry and Peter. He wears a blue jacket with pockets, an orange turtleneck jumper underneath, brown trousers, and dark brown shoes. Like Mum, he has never trusted Henry to be well behaved. He also likes making Henry and Peter very healthy packed lunches. Peter often shows off to Dad by being perfect while Henry misbehaves. Specifically, he punishes Henry by banning the TV and/or the computer, but mostly resorts to cancellation or reduction of pocket money, as shown in "Horrid Henry's Hike". He shows favouritism when it comes to Henry and Peter. He tends to believe the best of Peter and the worst of Henry, as even if Henry was telling the truth (such as when Peter misbehaves), he will still dismiss it as "rubbish" and will find excuses for him; a good example being in "Perfect Peter's Horrid Day" when Peter sprays Henry with a hose deliberately, even chasing him around the garden, and he ended up telling Henry that he should have got out of the way when Peter was "watering the flowers". Although strict, he is much more tolerant and patient with Henry than Mum is by giving him second chances. He is often shown to be capable of distracting Henry enough that he behaves. Dad works as an office manager at Tingly Toothbrushes. His work boss is Big Bob, whom Dad does not seem to like as a friend, but he does take him seriously when it comes to working. In terms of the way that he gets treated by Bob and Henry, Dad prefers Henry's treatment instead of Bob's as he is very strict. It is revealed that "Gross Class Zero" was his favourite show when he was a boy. At the end of "Horrid Henry and the Silly Siblings", it is revealed that his childhood nickname is "Silly Simon", and it is also implied that Henry gets his horrid streak from him, while Peter gets his perfect nature from Fussy Uncle Francis. He is voiced by Wayne Forester. In Horrid Henry: The Movie, he is portrayed by Mathew Horne.

=== Moody Margaret ===
Moody Margaret is a girl who is portrayed as the primary main antagonist in the Horrid Henry franchise, and serves as Horrid Henry's competitive arch-enemy and next-door neighbour. She is very bossy and domineering, and is capable of releasing violent, piercing screams when her demands remain unfulfilled, as shown in "Horrid Henry and Moody Margaret" and "Moody Margaret Moves In". She wears a green cardigan with a white and lavender striped shirt underneath, a dark green skirt, frilly light lavender socks, and purple cap toe lace-up boots. Her parents spoil her and let her do anything that she wants. Margaret has a tendency to gloat about her various accomplishments in a ridiculously narcissistic fashion, looking down on others and domineering her friends and peers. True to this, she is resented by her best friend Sour Susan because of her rudeness, but Susan seems to have no other choice than to reluctantly obey Margaret's commands. Margaret leads the Secret Club in various plots formulated against Henry's Purple Hang Gang. In "Perfect Peter's Revenge", she is happy when Peter sends her a forged letter saying that Henry loves and wants to marry her, although it is unknown if Margaret truly has a crush on Henry or not. Margaret, however, occasionally assists Henry in his plans in episodes like "Horrid Henry's Horrid Revenge" and "Horrid Henry and the Big Dig". In "Horrid Henry: Rockstar!", her full name is revealed to be Margaret Millicent Maudita Smythe. Despite being a bit of a bully, Margaret is friends with most of the girls in her class. She is also very vain, frequently fussing over her appearance and trying to outshine her friends in fashion and toys. She is also quite athletic and loves to play football.

While Francesca Simon was in the process of creating Moody Margaret, she suggested a boy called Moody Martin, but her husband Martin Stamp did not approve of the idea as he thought that Moody Martin was too similar to Horrid Henry, the main character. Therefore, Simon made him a girl instead, and his name was changed into Moody Margaret. Simon stated in an interview that Margaret was based on herself at a young age and how she imagined Margaret Thatcher to have been as a child. Margaret is voiced by Sue Elliott-Nichols in the TV series. In Horrid Henry: The Movie, she is portrayed by Scarlett Stitt.

=== Rude Ralph ===
Rude Ralph is Horrid Henry's best friend, who lives the life of luxury that Henry dreams of having. He wears a red jacket with a zipper, white trousers, and blue shoes. In Series 4, he sometimes wears a blue jacket. He gladly assists Henry in many of his plans, including plots to raid Moody Margaret's Secret Club, with him being a member of Henry's Purple Hand Gang, and even joining with Henry in bullying Perfect Peter in some stories (e.g. calling Peter a "crybaby" in "Horrid Henry's Stinkbomb"). In the TV series, contrary to his alliterative nickname, he is actually much more friendly, laid-back, and sensible than Henry. Unlike Henry, he does not mind eating healthy food or hanging out with girls, and he even befriends Peter in a few episodes. Besides Henry, he is often seen with Aerobic Al and Beefy Bert. He is voiced by Aidan Cook. In Horrid Henry: The Movie, he is portrayed by Lloyd Howells.

=== Sour Susan ===
Sour Susan is Moody Margaret's best friend. She wears a lime-green dress and gren and white trainers. She is rude, a bit dense, sassy and immature, and likes to copy Margaret by saying, "Yeah, [whatever Margaret said]," when she insults people (mainly boys) such as Horrid Henry, Rude Ralph or even Perfect Peter. Margaret is often a bad friend to Susan, as they always have arguments (e.g. an annoyed Margaret telling her that she will take her to the Ashton Athletics match if she is nice towards her in "Horrid Henry and the Football Fiend"). She always moans at Margaret when she thinks that she is being selfish and unfair. In "Horrid Henry's Stinkbomb", Susan is stated to hate Lazy Linda as she had not invited her to a sleepover. However, in "Moody Margaret's Sleepover", Susan and Linda seem to get along fine. In the TV series, her face is mostly puckered, like when someone eats sour food. She is voiced by Joanna Ruiz. In Horrid Henry: The Movie, she is portrayed by Helena Barlow.

=== Miss Battle-Axe ===
Miss Boudicca Battle-Axe is a strict Scottish teacher and the secondary antagonist. She teaches Horrid Henry and many of his classmates such as Moody Margaret, Rude Ralph and Sour Susan. She seems to have a particular disliking towards Henry, usually due to his horrid behaviour which disrupts her class. She once said that Henry's class was the worst she ever taught in "Horrid Henry's School Project". Her mother, Mother Battle-Axe, appears in the story "Horrid Henry Dines at Restaurant Le Posh" and a few episodes, where she disciplines her daughter greatly. In several episodes like "Horrid Henry Delivers a Message", Miss Battle-Axe is hinted to secretly have a crush on Soggy Sid. Despite hating Henry's class, it is apparent that Miss Battle-Axe is tough enough to survive teaching it, as all of Henry's teachers prior to her are mentioned to have quit because of him. In the Series 4 episode "Horrid Henry's Movie Moments", she is revealed to have an identical twin sister who is also called Miss Battle-Axe, but is the Headmistress of Our Lady Giddiantus Private School, and talks with a posh English Received Pronunciation accent. However, in Horrid Henry: The Movie, the Headmistress of Our Lady Giddiantus is named "Miss Dinesta Clutterbuck" on the sign outside.

Tony Ross stated that Miss Battle-Axe was "the character [he] enjoyed drawing [the] most", drawing inspiration from one of his first primary school teachers. Miss Battle-Axe is voiced by Aidan Cook in the TV series. In Horrid Henry: The Movie, she is portrayed by Anjelica Huston.

== Recurring characters ==
- Aerobic Al: An extremely athletic boy who is one of Henry's closest friends. He is often displayed engaging in various athletic endeavours. He wears a white T-shirt, blue shorts, and lime and white shoes. In the TV series, he speaks with a Brummie accent and is voiced by Wayne Forester. In Horrid Henry: The Movie, he is portrayed by Jack Sanders.
- Anxious Andrew: A nervous and meek boy who always worries about unnecessary things, and one of Henry's classmates. He wears a pale green shirt, a green jumper-vest, blue-grey trousers, and brown shoes. He is best friends with Weepy William. He is voiced by Sue Elliott-Nichols.
- Beefy Bert: The biggest boy in Henry's class. He wears a blue jacket with a yellow shirt underneath, brown trousers, and white trainers. Whenever anyone asks him a question, his immediate answer is "I dunno," which is actually the only line that Bert ever says throughout the entire book series (apart from "Horrid Henry's School Project", where he also says, "Mine!"). Both his parents and his brother also say "I dunno," as revealed when he films them for a school project in the story "Horrid Henry Tells It Like It Is". In the TV series, Bert is usually seen in the crowds of children at Ashton Primary School, and is normally seen with Ralph and Al. He is voiced by Wayne Forester; his voice was originally low-pitched and deep, but from the second series onwards, it was changed to a higher-pitched, nasally one. Like his book counterpart, the only word he says is "I dunno." However, in the Series 1 episode "Horrid Henry Gets Rich Quick", he says "Have you got any food?", and in the Series 4 episode "Horrid Henry: Who's Who?", after switching personalities with Brainy Brian, he gives his answers in full sentences. He has an aunt who, unlike Bert and his parents, does not say, "I dunno," as revealed in "Horrid Henry's Sleepover". In Horrid Henry: The Movie, he is portrayed by Connor O'Mara.
- Big Bob: Dad's strict work boss. First appearing in "Horrid Henry Goes to Work", he is extremely proud of his son, Bill, whom he believes is perfect. However, he discovers that this is not the case after catching Bill photocopying his bottom. He grounds Bill for a month and sends him home. He is mentioned in "Horrid Henry's Arch Enemy". In the TV series, he is referred to as Bob or Bob Sir, and is the CEO of Tingly Toothbrushes, a company that makes toothbrushes in their factory. Dad is one of his employees. He appeared in the adaptation of "Horrid Henry Goes to Work", and has also appeared in "Horrid Henry's Heist" as the school inspector at the fancy dress party (where his character design looks like an older version of his son, Bill), "Horrid Henry's Skipping Lesson" when he was in the park on his way to an appointment with Bill's headmaster, and "Horrid Henry Helps Out". He is voiced by Aidan Cook.
- Bossy Bill: The stuck-up son of Dad's boss Big Bob. His father thought he was perfect until Henry tricked him into photocopying his bottom at the office, but he still is a mischievous boy, as is evident from when he made tea, but added salt instead of sugar. In the books, he appears in "Horrid Henry Goes to Work", "Horrid Henry's Arch Enemy" and "Horrid Henry's Horrid Weekend". In the TV series, he is voiced by Joanna Ruiz and has a Scouse accent. He appears in "Horrid Henry Goes to Work", "Perfect Peter Pumps Up", "Horrid Henry Says Goodbye", "Perfect Peter's Perfect Day", "Horrid Henry's Skipping Lesson" and "Horrid Henry Helps Out".
- Brainy Brian: An intelligent boy in Henry's class. He wears blue glasses, a pink short-sleeved shirt with a blue pen in his pocket, green floral short trousers, and white and blue trainers. In the books, he and Clever Clare dislike each other, although the spin-off book Horrid Henry's Annual 2008 states that they are best friends. He is voiced by Aidan Cook. In Horrid Henry: The Movie, he is portrayed by Reuben Lee.
- Bunny: Peter's toy rabbit. He is named "Bunnykins" in the books. His most major roles in the TV series are in "Horrid Henry and the Time Capsule", in which Henry gives Bunny to the capsule and rescues him; "Horrid Henry: Trapped!", in which Henry has Bunny in the hospital after he was injured whilst saving Peter from a falling shelf in the cellar; and "Perfect Peter Pumps Up", in which Henry realises that the only way to turn Peter aggressive is to steal Bunny and make fun of him.
- Clever Clare: The smartest girl in Henry's class. She wears a magenta shirt, blue trousers, white socks, purple medium heeled shoes, and carries a purse over her right shoulder. She is best friends with Brainy Brian. In "Horrid Henry's Double Dare", she has to get all her spellings wrong. She only appears in the TV series as a minor character in an Ashton Primary school photograph in "Horrid Henry: Nothing But The Truth" as a member of Perfect Peter's class. She also appears in "Horrid Henry: It's All Your Fault" when she was singing with Sour Susan, Gorgeous Gurinder and Singing Soraya in the musical number, "Born To Be Rude". She is voiced by Joanna Ruiz in "Horrid Henry: Ace Reporter" and Sue Elliott-Nichols in "Horrid Henry and the Funny Bunny Hop".
- Crabby Chris: A teenager who once babysat Horrid Henry but never came back after Henry hid her homework and spilt grapefruit juice on her jeans. She is only seen in a flashback in "Horrid Henry and the Bogey Babysitter", and appears in several episodes as a background character. She is voiced by Emma Tate.
- Dr Dettol is a doctor who gives injections. She appears at the end of "Horrid Henry's Injection", voiced by Joanna Ruiz, and "Horrid Henry and the Germy Germ", voiced by Sue Elliott-Nichols. She speaks with an Irish accent.
- Fang: Henry's loyal, vicious hamster. He often feuds with Fluffy, and has a helpful ear when Henry needs someone to talk to. He is an unusual hamster in which he is up in the day, sleeps in a bed, and is able to say, "Yeah, yeah, yeah!" He is also useful to Henry for when he plots revenge against an enemy. Fang acts like a dog and sniffs out the missing Fluffy in ""Horrid Henry: Where's Fluffy?". In another episode, Fang has a major role, when he goes missing. The family presumes that he died, and when Henry finds him a day later, he dresses Fang up as a poodle for him to pose for Peter's replacement pet. Sometimes he is mistaken for a rat, which is what Moody Margaret calls him. His vocal effects are provided by Tamsin Heatley. In "Horrid Henry and the Snotslimer Redemption", Fang is given a speaking role with an American accent, provided by Wayne Forester. His only book appearances are in the spin-off books Horrid Henry's Annual 2008 and Horrid Henry's A-Z of Everything Horrid.
- Fluffy: Henry's family's white cat. She is incredibly lazy and likes sleeping, and hates moving about. In the TV series, she feuds with Henry's hamster Fang, and her fur is coloured grey. She is shown in most episodes sitting by the sitting room window sill at night, using the TV remote (later changed to a tablet in Series 4) during the night to switch to sunrise. Like Peter, she seems to dislike Henry as she once framed him for eating several packets of a snack that Mum likes. Despite being female, she is sometimes referred to as a "he". Peter is completely devoted to her, and never believes that she does anything wrong, even though she started chasing Fang in one episode, and Peter said that Fang started the fight. Her vocal effects are provided by Tamsin Heatley.
- Goody-Goody Gordon: One of Peter's best friends. He usually wears a yellow jumper with a white shirt underneath, blue trousers, and gray shoes. He is a member of the Best Boys Club and is friends with Tidy Ted and Spotless Sam. Gordon's dad (voiced by Aidan Cook) is seen in "Horrid Henry Goes to Work" where he is a Tingly Toothbrushes employee, and as a news reporter in a few episodes. He often speaks with a lisp, and is voiced by Joanna Ruiz. In Horrid Henry: The Movie, he is portrayed by Joshua-James Thomas.
- Gorgeous Gurinder: A beautiful and vain Indian-British girl who appears to be best friends with Singing Soraya and Lazy Linda. They are all members of the Secret Club. She wears a light pinkish-white shirt with purple flowers on it, pink trousers, light pinkish-white ballet pumps, and a blue bracelet on each arm. In later episodes, she also has a good knowledge of makeup products as she is seen teaching Henry how to put on hand cream. She is voiced by Joanna Ruiz. In Horrid Henry: The Movie, she is portrayed by Nikita Mistry.
- Greasy Greta: A lady from the counter in the school cafeteria who is in charge of the packed lunch room. She first appeared in "Horrid Henry and the Demon Dinner Lady", where she is sent to look after the kids in the lunch room because they were always playing with their food. She always takes the children's treats and eats them, but runs away after eating hot chili powder biscuits that Henry brought in. In the TV series, she eats far too many treats and is wheeled out of the school on a trolley by Soggy Sid, saying that she is banning packed lunches and putting all students on school dinners. She returns in "Horrid Henry and the Revenge of the Demon Dinner Lady" from the book, Horrid Henry's Nightmare. This time she inspects lunch boxes to promote healthy eating, and has a daughter named Pasty Patsy. When Henry asks Patsy why she does not get her lunchbox inspected, she replies that she is Greta's daughter and can have what she wants, much to Henry's surprise. Greta is fired when Miss Oddbod catches her in the cupboard eating the confiscated sweets that were supposed to be donated to charity. She is voiced by Sue Elliott-Nichols. In Horrid Henry: The Movie, she is portrayed by Jo Brand.
- Great Aunt Greta: Henry's great aunt. She thinks that Henry is a little girl called Henrietta (or Henry in "Horrid Henry's Underpants"), and that Peter is a teenager. This is reflected in the presents that she sends to the boys. Although Henry's Mum and Dad have told her countless times that Henry is a boy and that Peter is six, Greta refuses to believe this and usually doesn't hear, most likely due to her having some form of dementia. Her dementia is such that she once cooked cat food for the boys and believed that Fluffy was a dog named Fido. She also mistook the time of day to be the middle of the night when in fact it was only half past five in the afternoon. She is voiced by Tamsin Heatley. In Horrid Henry: The Movie, she is portrayed by Prunella Scales.
- Greedy Graham: A greedy boy in Henry's class. He usually wears an orange T-shirt with a blue collar and sleeve hems, blue sweatpants with a single white stripe on each leg, and red and white trainers. He is always hungry and is often seen eating carrots and junk food in the earlier episodes. He is shown to be one of Henry's close friends. He has a Cockney accent in some early episodes and a Cornish accent for the majority of his appearances, and is voiced by Wayne Forester.
- Jolly Josh: A boy in Henry's class who is always jolly, happy, and loves to play pranks and practical jokes on others. He wears a red and white striped shirt, yellow trousers, blue and white shoes and long red socks. He is voiced by Aidan Cook.
- Killer Boy Rats: A Norwegian-American rock band formed in 2000, and Horrid Henry's favourite band. The band consists of lead singer Ed Banger (Norwegian), guitarists Franky Fastfingers and Angus Airbrain the Third (both British), and keyboardist Fizz Whizz McTizz (American; formerly British). In the episode "Horrid Henry and the Killer Boy Rats", Ed leaves the band and begins writing and singing "nice songs", much to Henry's ire and Peter's delight. After Henry gets up on stage during a concert and sings (loudly and off-key) one of his Killer Boys Rats songs, his manager phones Henry and congratulates him. Henry is then given tickets to the next Killer Boy Rats concert. On television, Ed says that he is going back to being a Killer Boy Rats member and his manager explains that it was Henry inspired him to return to the music group. Henry and his family then go to the concert where the Killer Boy Rats sing a song ("Gonna Be a Rock Star") as a token of thanks and appreciation to Henry, who is on stage with them as a drummer. In "Horrid Henry and the Bogey Brain Sleepover", a temporary member, guitarist Ziggy, is mentioned by Moody Margaret to have performed on one of their albums. The band members' speaking voices are provided by Aidan Cook (Ed, Fizz Whizz in "Horrid Henry and the Killer Boy Rats"), Wayne Forester (Angus) and Sue Elliott-Nichols (Fizz Whizz in "Horrid Henry and the Lucky Thing" and "Horrid Henry and the Hotel Horrid"), while Matthew Corbett and Nick Blackman perform the vocals for the songs. In Horrid Henry: The Movie, Ed is portrayed by Noel Fielding. The story "Horrid Henry: Up, Up and Away" features a different lead singer for the group, named "King Killer".
- Lazy Linda: A lazy girl in Henry's class who is often seen sleeping. She wears a green short-sleeved polo shirt, a magenta button up dungaree dress, frilly white socks and white and turquoise grippy trainers. She uses the word "like" and has a Cockney accent. She is a member of the Secret Club, which she initially joined as a replacement for Susan. At one point, Margaret fired her and Susan returned; however, at another point Linda returned as well. She and Susan are foes and sometimes friends. Linda is voiced by Emma Tate. (Note: Credited in Horrid Henry's Gross Day Out.) In Horrid Henry: The Movie, she is portrayed by Ela Warburton.
- Lisping Lily: A toddler and New Nick's younger sister, who is largely infatuated with Horrid Henry (pronouncing his name "Henwy") and is known for her noticeable lisp. Her common catchphrases in the book are "I love you, Henwy," and "Will you mawwy with me, Henwy?" She also has a doll that sprays water in Henry's face. She is voiced by Joanna Ruiz.
- Madame Tutu: A dance teacher at Ashton Primary School. She first appeared in "Horrid Henry's Dance Class", referred to as "Miss Impatience Tutu" in the book story. As her name suggests, she is very mean and impatient. Despite this, she describes herself as a patient woman. She is said to hate teaching, noise, children, and Horrid Henry. In the TV series, she is referred to as "Madame Tutu" and speaks with a French accent when talking to her class, but speaks with an English accent when talking to Henry individually. She seems to be a lot nicer in the TV series than in the books. She organises the show "I Hear Thunder" in "Horrid Henry's Dance Class". Madame Tutu is voiced by Emma Tate. In Horrid Henry: The Movie, she is portrayed by Tamsin Heatley.
- Miss. Oddbod: The head teacher of Ashton Primary School. Her name is revealed as "Mrs Oddbod" in the story "Horrid Henry's School Project". Despite being strict and stern, she still recognises Peter's good behaviour and chooses him to greet the Queen when she visits her school. In the TV series and film, she is addressed as "Miss Oddbod". Despite her title as head teacher, she is somewhat kinder to Henry than Miss Battle-Axe. She is generally good-natured but can act strange at times (e.g. digging up time capsules from the school grounds at night in "Horrid Henry and the Time Capsule"). Her first name is Cynthia, as revealed in the episode "Horrid Henry: Horrid Headmaster". She is voiced by Emma Tate. In Horrid Henry: The Movie, she is portrayed by Rebecca Front.
- Miss. Lovely: Peter's teacher. As her name suggests, she has a gentle nature. She is very proud of Peter's progress and behaviour and is always saying nice things about him to his parents. However, she loses her temper on some occasions (e.g. in "Horrid Henry's Computer" when Peter hands in a "Why I Hate My Teacher" essay, which he wrote as "Why I Love My Teacher", which Henry edited the night before, and "Horrid Henry Peeks at Peter's Diary" when Peter reads his diary, "improved" by Henry). Her first name is Lydia, as revealed in the story "Horrid Henry Runs Away", and she is revealed to be a vegetarian in "Horrid Henry and the Zombie Vampire". In the TV series, she is often seen in the library on duty when she is in the reading area. During early seasons, Miss Lovely spoke with an Indian accent. However, later on in the series, she speaks with a Welsh accent. She often uses the word "lovely". She is voiced by Joanna Ruiz. In Horrid Henry: The Movie, she is portrayed by Parminder Nagra.
- Mr. Kill: Henry's teddy bear. He genuinely cares about him, as shown in "Horrid Henry: Who Stole Mr Kill?". According to Francesca Simon, Mr Kill got his name when one of her son Joshua Stamp's friends called his teddy "Mr Kill". She thought that was so funny that she stole the name.
- Mr. Nerdon: A teacher who first appeared in the story "Horrid Henry's New Teacher". His first name is Ninius. After a prank pulled by Henry involving Peter, he collapses and Miss Battle-Axe takes over the class. In the TV series, he is a substitute teacher for Henry's class when Miss Battle-Axe gets the flu, although a prank involving frogs makes him run away screaming from the class. He later appears in the Series 5 episodes "Horrid Henry Wins the Cup" and "Horrid Henry and the Measly Mascot" and the special "Horrid Henry's Wild Weekend", where he works at Brick House School and leads the Brick House Boys for the Brainbox of the Year contest. He speaks with a Welsh accent, and is voiced by Wayne Forester.
- Mr. and Mrs. Smythe: Moody Margaret's lenient parents who spoil her and give her everything that her heart desires. They first appear in "Moody Margaret Moves In" when Margaret spends a week in Henry's home, but misbehaves and is punished. In "Horrid Henry on TV", Henry swaps houses with Margaret, but then gets kicked out because he sat on Mr Smythe's chair. Mrs Smythe is voiced by Sue Elliott-Nichols and Mr Smythe is voiced by Aidan Cook. In Horrid Henry: The Movie, Mr Smythe is portrayed by Philip Pope.
- New Nick: The newest boy in Henry's class. He wears a yellow shirt with a red collar around his neck, blue trousers and brown shoes. He first appears in "Horrid Henry's Sleepover", where he invites Henry to stay the night at his house. When Henry arrives, he finds that the house has a lot of dogs and Nick's parents are opera karaoke singers (dressed as a Viking and vampire, respectively; voiced by Emma Tate and Aidan Cook), and has a thoroughly miserable evening. Nick has appeared a couple of times since, but it is not clear to whether he ever renews his friendship with Henry. His singing voice is very melodramatic, implying that he picked it up from his parents. He is voiced by Sue Elliott-Nichols.
- Nurse Needle: A nurse who appears in "Horrid Henry's Injection". She tries to give Henry an injection, but Henry pretends to be sick and is sent home. She returns in "Horrid Henry and the Germy Germ". She speaks with a Yorkshire accent and is voiced by Tamsin Heatley.
- Pimply Paul: Henry and Peter's cousin-in-law, and Prissy Polly's grouchy husband. They get married in "Horrid Henry's Wedding", and later have a baby daughter, Vomiting Vera, as shown in "Horrid Henry's Car Journey". The TV series adaptation of "Horrid Henry's Wedding" reveals that his surname is Peregrine. Paul and Henry have a mutual hatred for each other, with Paul calling Henry a "brat" or "brat face" and Henry hating Paul because he is a sourpuss. Despite appearing to be grouchy and cynical, he loves his wife Polly and daughter Vera and would do anything for the latter, and he seems to like Peter as well. In Series 4, Paul later starts to like Henry, and is revealed to work as a milkman in "Horrid Henry Delivers the Milk". After the events in that episode, he no longer calls Henry a "brat", discovers how much they have in common and becomes his friend. He is voiced by Wayne Forester.
- Prissy Polly: Henry and Peter's older cousin and Pimply Paul's wife. They get married in "Horrid Henry's Wedding", and together they have a daughter, Vomiting Vera. Polly is an emotional, fussy, spoiled, nagging young woman who wants everything to be her way. In Series 1 of the TV series, she appears to be much more spoiled and childish and a bit meaner than in the books and also has fits of anger, usually around Henry. She usually appears smiling, giggling hysterically (even when outraged), and is not very bright. Despite her selfish and spoiled ways, she does not mean to behave this way and is sweet-natured. When things do not go her way, she will even cry about it. "Horrid Henry's Wedding" reveals that her surname is Penelope, implying that is the rest of Henry's family surname, while she took Paul's surname, Peregrine, after their marriage. From Series 2 onwards she starts to treat Henry a lot better. She is voiced by Tamsin Heatley. In Horrid Henry: The Movie, she is portrayed by Kimberley Walsh.
- Rabid Rebecca: A very strict babysitter and the toughest teenager in town. Introduced in "Horrid Henry and the Bogey Babysitter", she babysits Henry and Peter. Henry has a tough job getting rid of her, eventually succeeding after discovering that she is scared of spiders. She returns in "Horrid Henry and the Revenge of the Bogey Babysitter", accompanied by her best friend Rancid Rachel, who is even meaner than Rebecca and is scared of nothing at all. In the TV series, she also appears in "Horrid Henry's Smelly Stuff", "Horrid Henry's Haircut", where she is training to become a hairdresser; "Horrid Henry and the Terrible Teacher", where she is referred to as Miss Rancid and is a substitute teacher for Miss Battle-Axe, who is on holiday, only to be fired when Miss Oddbod sees her chasing Peter; "Horrid Henry and the Football Fiend", where she is seen in the audience at the match; and "Horrid Henry and the Killer Boy Rats", where she is seen in the audience reacting in shock to Henry singing, "Slimy, slimy, slime!" She has very large teeth that are always visible, even when her mouth is shut. She is voiced by Joanna Ruiz.
- Rich Aunt Ruby: Henry and Peter's wealthy aunt, Mum's sister, Dad's sister-in-law and Stuck-Up Steve's mother. She is shown to be a very posh lady and is dressed fashionably and lives in a very large mansion with Steve. She first appeared in "Horrid Henry's Christmas", where she buys Steve loads of great presents and Henry "somehow" manages to help himself to a few of them by switching the labels. She also appears in "Horrid Henry's Haunted House", where Henry scares Steve from his room and she assures Steve that there are no monsters under his bed (in the TV series adaptation, Henry scares her and Steve away from their house); and "Horrid Henry Dines at Restaurant Le Posh", where she takes Steve and Henry's family to a fancy French restaurant. Ruby speaks with a posh-sounding accent and is voiced by Sue Elliott-Nichols. In Horrid Henry: The Movie, she is portrayed by Helen Lederer.
- Singing Soraya: A girl in Henry's class who loves to sing. She wears a golden shirt, light blue jeans, and red and white shell-toe trainers. She even sings most of her sentences to her friends. Singing is more than just a hobby or interest to her, and Soraya is musically gifted. She is a member of the Secret Club with Sour Susan, Moody Margaret, Gorgeous Gurinder and Lazy Linda. Margaret reveals that Soraya is good at maths, despite not usually being noticed for her talent. She is voiced by Joanna Ruiz in the TV series. In Horrid Henry: The Movie, she is portrayed by Nethra Tilakumara.
- Soggy Sid: Horrid Henry's swimming teacher. He first appeared in "Horrid Henry's Swimming Lesson". Sid is shown to be strict and impatient, dismissing Henry's excuses as to why he can't take part in the swimming lesson, and ordering him out of the pool when he misbehaves. He prefers to give orders than teach; instead of helping the students who are not strong swimmers to improve their swimming abilities, he just tells them to start swimming. Not many of the students seem to like him. In the TV series, he is also the school's PE teacher and detention supervisor, and undertakes caretaking/cleaning duties in a few episodes. In some episodes like "Horrid Henry and the Miserable Musical" and "Horrid Henry: Untouchable", it is implied that he has a crush on Miss Battle-Axe. In one episode, his full name is revealed to be Sidmouth Soggington. He is voiced by Aidan Cook in the TV series. In Horrid Henry: The Movie, he is portrayed by David Schneider.
- Spotless Sam: One of Peter's friends and a member of the Best Boys Club. He has light tan skin and black hair, appearing to be of Asian descent. He wears a white shirt with a blue stripe, blue trousers, and blue shoes. He is voiced by Emma Tate in the TV series, with the exception of "Horrid Henry's Tricks and Treats", where he was voiced by Sue Elliott-Nichols. In Horrid Henry: The Movie, he is portrayed by Frank Kauer.
- Stuck-Up Steve: Henry and Peter's older cousin, Mum and Dad's nephew, and the son of Rich Aunt Ruby who is one of Henry's enemies. He is hated by Henry because he is rich, greedy and spoiled, brags about his wealthiness, and refuses to share with his cousin. Ruby buys him anything that he wants and loves to spoil him. However, she will discipline Steve when he is naughty or embarrasses her. Steve is also snobby and selfish as he makes fun of people who are poorer than him, as shown in "Horrid Henry's Christmas" when he exclaims, "What a dump!" while Henry's family are cleaning up. In that story, Henry switches the labels on his and Steve's presents, allowing him to help himself to some presents intended for Steve, while Steve receives presents intended for Henry, such as socks. In "Horrid Henry's Haunted House", Steve disallows Henry to play with his toys, so Henry convinces him that there is a monster under his bed. In "Horrid Henry Dines at Restaurant Le Posh" and "Horrid Henry Eats Out", Henry eats snails and tripe when Steve dared him to. In "Horrid Henry's Horrid Weekend", Henry is forced to spend a whole weekend with Steve and Bossy Bill. When they trick him into breaking his bed, Henry is banned from going to their friend Hoity-Toity Tim's paintballing party, but he tricks them into going in their pyjamas, leaving them humiliated. In the Series 5 episode "Horrid Henry's Class Action", he faces Henry in the School Council election. Steve attends Brick House School, a school for rich kids, along with the Brick House Boys. He speaks with an upper class London accent and is voiced by Joanna Ruiz. In Horrid Henry: The Movie, he is portrayed by Tyger Drew-Honey.
- Tetchy Tess: A bad-tempered teenage girl who once babysat Horrid Henry but refused to come back after Henry flooded the bathroom. She appears in the TV series adaptation of "Horrid Henry and the Bogey Babysitter" (in a flashback) and "Horrid Henry Goes to the Park", where she is quite laid-back. She likes listening to music and as such does so on her earphone MP3 player, and does not like to be disturbed if so. She does not get her revenge on anyone and forgets about anything bad that has happened, as she accepts Henry's apology when he last saw her after he flooded the bathroom. Tess is later revealed to idolise Ed Banger, based on her reaction when seeing him (she faints). She speaks with a Mancunian accent and is voiced by Sue Elliott-Nichols.
- Tidy Ted: One of Peter's friends and a member of the Best Boys Club who is always tidy, hence his name. He wears a purple jumper, a teal necktie white shirt, blue-grey trousers and dark red shoes. His dad (voiced by Aidan Cook) works as a plumber, first appearing in "Horrid Henry's Sick Day". He is confirmed to be Ted's father as seen in the Horrid Henry Father's Day post. He is voiced by Tamsin Heatley in most of his appearances, save for "Horrid Henry Tricks and Treats" where he was voiced by Sue Elliott-Nichols, and "Horrid Henry's School Trip", where he was voiced by Aidan Cook. In Horrid Henry: The Movie, he is portrayed by Gabriel Werb.
- Vomiting Vera: Prissy Polly and Pimply Paul's infant daughter and Horrid Henry and Perfect Peter's first cousin once removed. She tends to vomit on anyone or anything in sight, much to others' annoyance. Henry hopes never to see her again until she is grown up and behind bars. Vera is described as being prissy and pimply like her parents in the books, while in the TV series she has pale skin and blond hair and wears a bow, a pink shirt and pink tights. She is voiced by Tamsin Heatley. In Horrid Henry: The Movie, she is portrayed by Lily and Sasha Demetriou Ottaway.
- Weepy William: A boy in Henry's class who often cries at the slightest things. He wears a purple jumper with a pale green shirt, beige trousers, and brown shoes. He is best friends with Anxious Andrew, and also appears a lot with Greedy Graham and Brainy Brian as well. He is a member of the Purple Hand Gang. William's dad (voiced by Lizzie Waterworth) is a newspaper reporter, and the most successful and famous journalist in Ashton, according to Moody Margaret. William is voiced by Sue Elliott-Nichols. In Horrid Henry: The Movie, he is portrayed by Billy Kennedy.

== Books ==
- Babbling Bob: A boy in Henry's class who won't stop talking.
- Dizzy Dave: A boy in Henry's class who is always spinning and knocking things over. He is shown to be one of Henry's close friends.
- Fiery Fiona: A girl in Henry's class who has a fiery temper and argues a lot.
- Helpful Hari: A boy in Peter's class. He only appears in "Perfect Peter's Pirate Party".
- Inky Ian: A boy in Henry's class. He only appears in the book version of "Horrid Henry and the Football Fiend" and "Horrid Henry's Chicken". According to Francesca Simon, Ian was based on a young Ian Rankin, the author of the Inspector Rebus series.
- Jazzy Jim: A boy in Henry's class who likes music. He appears in "Horrid Henry Meets the Queen", "Horrid Henry and the Football Fiend", "Horrid Henry's Arch Enemy" and "Horrid Henry's Bake Off".
- Kind Kasim: A boy in Henry's class who dislikes his behaviour. He is mentioned in "Perfect Peter's Revenge" and "Horrid Henry's Christmas Presents", and appears in "Horrid Henry and the Football Fiend" and "Horrid Henry's Arch Enemy".
- Kung-Fu Kate: A girl in Henry's class who likes martial arts and is friends with Margaret.
- Magic Martha: A girl in Henry's class who performs magic tricks.
- Megaphone Meg: A girl in Henry's class who is always shouting.
- Mini Minnie: A girl in Peter's class. She is invited to Peter's party in "Perfect Peter's Pirate Party" and is revealed to have twin sisters in "Horrid Henry and the Zoom of Doom".
- Nitty Nora: A nit nurse who is called in by Ashton Primary School to track down the infected during an outbreak of nits. She finds the entire class, including Miss Battle-Axe, to be infested with nits, all except Henry. In Horrid Henry: The Movie, she is portrayed by Lizzie Waterworth.
- Norwegian Norris: A Norwegian boy in Henry's class who dislikes practices in Henry's school, saying that they would not happen in his home country. He was submitted by a Belgian boy named Keir as part of a competition where children created their own characters to be featured in a Horrid Henry story.
- Perky Parveen: A boy in Peter's class. He only appears in "Perfect Peter's Pirate Party" and "Horrid Henry and the Zoom of Doom".
- Stone-Age Steven: A boy in Henry's class who pretends to be a caveman. He appeared in "Horrid Henry Wakes the Dead", "Horrid Henry's Autobiography", and "Horrid Henry Writes a Story". According to Francesca Simon, Steven was based on actor and writer Steven Butler, who portrayed Henry in Horrid Henry: Live and Horrid!.
- Tell-Tale Tim: A boy in Peter's class. He only appears in "Perfect Peter's Pirate Party".
- T.J. Fizz: Horrid Henry's favourite author and Perfect Peter's least favourite, as he mentions that her books are too scary. She only appears in "Horrid Henry's Author Visit". Miss Battle-Axe sends Henry off to Peter's class due to his horrid behaviour, where he gets stuck with Milksop Miles, his least favourite author. Her counterpart in the TV series is B.B. Silver, the author of the "Gross Class Zero" books and comics, who appears in "Horrid Henry Meets B.B. Silver". Silver's design is based on Francesca Simon, the author of the original Horrid Henry books. She is voiced by series producer Lucinda Whiteley.
- Tough Toby: a boy in Henry's class who is often regarded as tough. He invited Henry to his party at Lazer Zap in "Horrid Henry's Birthday Party".
- Zippy Zoe: A quick girl in Henry's class. She appears in "Horrid Henry's School Election", "Horrid Henry Wakes the Dead", and "Horrid Henry Tells It Like It Is".

== TV series ==
- Brick House Boys: A duo of students from Brick House School. They first appeared in "Horrid Henry Takes a Shortcut", where they race against Horrid Henry and Rude Ralph (who fill in for Aerobic Al and Beefy Bert) in the cross country race. They appear in "Horrid Henry in Detention", having a football match against Henry's classmates, in which Ashton defeats them again. They later appear in Series 5 in "Horrid Henry Wins the Cup" and "Horrid Henry and the Measly Mascot" and the special Horrid Henry's Wild Weekend, as part of the Brick House team with Stuck-Up Steve for the Brainbox of the Year contest. Here they are far more unintelligent and silly, copying everything that Steve says and making fun of the Ashton Adventurers like Steve does. They are voiced by Wayne Forester in "Horrid Henry Takes a Shortcut", and Aidan Cook in "Horrid Henry Wins the Cup", "Horrid Henry and the Measly Mascot" and "Horrid Henry's Wild Weekend".
- Graham's Mum: A dinner lady who works in the school cafeteria in Series 4. She is very friendly, and also likes to give a special portion of food whenever it is a special school day. She appears in "Horrid Henry Goes to School", "Horrid Henry's Vile Vacation", "Horrid Henry: Who's Who?", "Horrid Henry's Magic Mayhem", "Horrid Henry and the Red Roof Gang" and "Horrid Henry: Eternal Schoolboy". She is voiced by Sue Elliott-Nichols.
- Mischievous Mike: One of Horrid Henry's friends who loves planes. He first appeared in "Horrid Henry Goes Fishing". Henry once borrowed his yellow plane in "Horrid Henry and the Perfect Plane", but Stuck-Up Steve crashed it, making Mike upset. He also appears in the episodes "Horrid Henry's Horrible Homework", "Horrid Henry and the Terrible Teacher", "Horrid Henry Flicks the Bogey", "Horrid Henry Goes on Strike" and "Horrid Henry's Class Action". All episodes reveal that he is a part-time student attending Ashton Primary School, as he is seen doing his paper round during school hours. He is voiced by Aidan Cook.
- Mrs. Crunch: A tour guide who works at Our Town Museum. She also runs Camp Sunshine, under the name Captain Crunch (similar to the American breakfast cereal Cap'n Crunch). She is very stern and does not take kindly to Henry's horrid behaviour. However, in spite of that, she realises Henry's potential at Camp Sunshine, and seems to be proud of his performance when presenting him with an award, much to his surprise. She speaks in an upper class accent and is voiced by Joanna Ruiz.
- Miss. Tiddler: A pessimistic elderly lady who lives on the same street as Horrid Henry and Perfect Peter, and is their neighbour. She is more commonly referred to as the Little Old Lady. Ms Tiddler owns a dog called Tiddles. She dislikes Henry's family and always calls them, as well as anyone, everything and anything, "horrid". She also does not seem to care for other people, as shown when she lets Tiddles pee on whoever he likes. In "Horrid Henry Meets Mr Tiddler", she has a twin sister (whose character design is reused for her in Series 5), a famous author who wrote Peter's favourite book, "The Story Of Mr Tiddler". She is voiced by Tamsin Heatley.
- Nasty Nicola: A girl who joins Henry's class in "Horrid Henry and the New Best Friend". She appears nice to begin with, but turns out to be nasty and vicious. She is voiced by Wayne Forester. A lookalike appeared in "Horrid Henry Meets B.B. Silver" calling herself Ashen Annabel, who looks exactly like Nicola, except smaller and with a different voice.
- Tiddles: A very poorly-trained dog who belongs to Miss. Tiddler, the elderly neighbour of Horrid Henry. He is more commonly referred to as the Dog That Wees. Miss. Tiddler is an irresponsible owner who spoils Tiddles usually and lets him wee on Henry and several other people's legs. In Series 2-4, he has light brown fur and blue eyes, and wears an orange collar and a red dog coat, which his yellow lead is connected to, rather than his collar. In Series 5, Tiddles has white fur and brown eyes, and wears a pink collar and a purple coat, which is always connected to a pink lead when he and his owner Miss. Tiddler are on walks. His vocal effects are provided by Tamsin Heatley.
- Wheely Walter: A disabled science teacher at Ashton Primary School who uses a wheelchair. He is introduced in "Horrid Henry and the Climbing Frame Clincher", teaching science. His name is revealed in "Horrid Henry and the Movie Star" when he auditions for the part of a dead ringer for Lose Laser Larry, but is fired for being "too wheely". He appears to get along with Henry, unlike the other teachers, but still sends him along with Moody Margaret to Miss Oddbod's office when they argue in his class. In "Horrid Henry's Teacher Talk", he claims that Horrid Henry once turned the ceiling blue in his class while he was making a cup of tea, and does not know who Perfect Peter is when asked about him. He is voiced by Wayne Forester. In Horrid Henry: The Movie, he is portrayed by Grant Logan.

== Horrid Henry: The Movie ==
=== Vicious Vicky ===
Vicious Vicky is Sour Susan's younger sister. She first appears in Horrid Henry: The Movie and in the Series 3 episode "Horrid Henry: Bogus Babysitter". In the film, she bites people for no reason. In the Series 2 episode "Horrid Henry Changes a Nappy", Susan mentions a baby sister whom she has to change her nappies, explaining her experience. In "Horrid Henry: Bogus Babysitter", after being thrown out by Moody Margaret, Vicky finds her way into Horrid Henry's house and raids the kitchen. She does feel remorse for her actions and makes up for it by stealing Margaret's cutlass, and uses it to frame her. Henry is impressed by this after initially being afraid of her. However in her next appearance in "Horrid Henry: It's All Your Fault", she scares Henry away from the climbing frame in the school playground and also intimidates Wheely Walter. In "Horrid Henry and the Game Changer", Vicky helps Aerobic Al and Henry win the round by taking the big book out of the treehouse, and Al splats Margaret in Gross Goo. She also appears in a flashback in "Horrid Henry's Girl Talk". Vicky is portrayed by Kia Pegg in Horrid Henry: The Movie, and voiced by Sue Elliott-Nichols in the TV series.

=== Vic Van Wrinkle ===
Vic Van Wrinkle is the strict, fiery-tempered headmaster of Brick House School and the main antagonist in Horrid Henry: The Movie. He tries to close Ashton Primary School and send all the students to Brick House School so he can earn enough money to close all the schools in Ashton. Despite being the main antagonist, Wrinkle never comes face to face with Horrid Henry or has any form of interaction with him. Instead he relies on his subordinates, two school inspectors (portrayed by Metin and Timur Ahmet), to sabotage his efforts in order to close down Ashton Primary. Perfect Peter reveals his plan to Miss Oddbod over the phone, and thwarts his escape by tying his shoelaces once the police locate his whereabouts. Wrinkle falls out the window, and, along with the school inspectors, is arrested and sent to jail. Wrinkle is portrayed by Richard E. Grant.
