= Guy Potter =

British actor, director and producer (born 1992)

- Born: Guy William Grahame Potter; 25 April 1992 (age 32); Cheltenham, Gloucestershire, U.K.
- Occupations: Actor; Director; Producer
- Years active: 2012 - present
- Known for: Ready Player One
- Website: www.guypotter.com

Guy Potter (born 25 April 1992) is a British actor, director and producer. He has featured in film, television and stage alongside working under his company High Sierra Films.

== Early life ==
Potter was born in Cheltenham, Gloucestershire in 1992. Potter attended Blundell's School in Devon, where he began performing in school productions and his class' self-scripted play The Importance of Being a Man, which was invited to go to the National Student Drama Festival (2010). Inspired by a school visit from Nina Gold for an audition for Steven Spielberg's War Horse, he decided to take acting seriously as a profession.

== Career ==
=== Acting ===
Potter first appeared in small parts in productions such as Mission Impossible: Rogue Nation and Ready Player One in which he also worked as a Stand-In for Jeremy Renner's character Brandt and Tye Sheridan's Wade Watts

In 2015, Potter left to study at the American Academy of Dramatic Arts in Los Angeles, studying under Scott Reiniger, star of Dawn of The Dead (1978). He was also accepted into the National Youth Film Academy in London studying under Rafael Kapelinski, the director of Butterfly Kisses (2017). This was also the year of his television debut on an episode of Endeavour as Gerald Ashbourne, a victim of heroin addiction.

In summer 2016, Potter was brought on board to Steven Spielberg's Ready Player One to work as a stand-in/double for Tye Sheridan. He was also cast as Leonard in Magpie and was invited to attend the 73rd Venice International Film Festival.

In 2017 he was cast in a lead role of 'Dan' in Felipe Torres Urso's directorial debut A Little Italian Vacation.

In 2018, he was cast as 'Tank' and other NPC's in Tom Clancy's The Division 2. Later in the year, Potter was cast in a supporting role in the BBC drama MotherFatherSon, sharing a scene with Richard Gere.

In 2019 he was accepted onto a mentorship programme with Sudance Co//ab under the Sundance Film Festival. and began pre-production on his Directorial Debut Trengellick Rising.

=== Directing ===
In 2019, Potter approached the Sundance Institute for support with the project and was accepted to take part in the Sundance Co//ab programme. This also led him to making the short Prey.

Soon after, Potter began writing and pre-producing his debut short film Trengellick Rising. Set in the 1700s and shot on 16mm black and white film, the film was to be spoken entirely in the Cornish Language.

In 2023 Trengellick Rising was accepted into the Oscar and BAFTA qualifying 'Encounters Film Festival', which was subsequently released in cinemas in January and March 2024. Devon & Cornwall Film described the film as "a force of nature" and the film won an award from Gorsedh Kernow in recognition for its contribution to Cornish Culture and Language.

In late 2024, pre-production began on the follow up film Hegoledh, with filming due to begin early spring.

=== Producing ===
In December 2015, Potter formed his production company High Sierra Films.

In 2016 he teamed up with French 75 to create his first co-produced venture Whatever the Weather which aired on BBC Points West and ITV News.

In 2023, Potter's first publicly released film Trengellick Rising was accepted into the Oscar and BAFTA qualifying 'Encounters Film Festival', which was subsequently released in cinemas in January and March 2024. Devon & Cornwall Film described the film as "a force of nature" and the film won an award from Gorsedh Kernow in recognition for its contribution to Cornish Culture and Language.

In late 2024, pre-production began on the follow up film Hegoledh, with filming due to begin early spring.

== See also ==
- List of directorial debuts
- List of British actors
