= Horrid Henry: The Movie =

2011 film by Nick Moore

- British theatrical release poster
- Directed by: Nick Moore
- Written by: Lucinda Whiteley
- Story by: Francesca Simon (uncredited)
- Based on: Horrid Henry by Francesca Simon
- Produced by: Allan Niblo; Rupert Preston; Mike Watts; Lucinda Whiteley
- Starring: Theo Stevenson; Richard E. Grant; Parminder Nagra; Kimberley Walsh; Mathew Horne; Dick and Dom; Noel Fielding; Jo Brand; Anjelica Huston
- Cinematography: Sam McCurdy
- Edited by: Simon Cozens
- Music by: Michael Price; Lester Barnes (uncredited)
- Production companies: Novel Entertainment; Prescience; Aegis Film Fund; UK Film Council
- Distributed by: Vertigo Films
- Release date: 29 July 2011 (United Kingdom)
- Running time: 93 minutes
- Country: United Kingdom
- Language: English
- Box office: $10.1 million

Horrid Henry: The Movie is a 2011 British comedy film directed by Nick Moore and produced by Allan Niblo, Rupert Preston, Mike Watts, and Lucinda Whiteley, who wrote it. In the film, Henry and the Purple Hand Gang fight to prevent the closure of their school by an evil private school headmaster. It is based on the fictional character Horrid Henry from the children's book series of the same name by Francesca Simon. The film stars Theo Stevenson, Richard E. Grant, Parminder Nagra, Kimberley Walsh, Mathew Horne, Siobhan Hayes, Dick and Dom, Noel Fielding, Jo Brand, and Anjelica Huston.

Horrid Henry: The Movie was released in cinemas on 29 July 2011 in 2D, RealD 3D, and 3D formats by Vertigo Films in the United Kingdom. Phase 4 Films and Entertainment One released the film in theatres in the United States and Canada on 22 December 2012. It received negative reviews from critics and grossed $10.1 million worldwide. It was then released on DVD and Blu-ray on 28 November 2011 in the United Kingdom and sold over 750,000 DVD copies in the UK.

== Plot ==
After once again neglecting to finish his homework, Horrid Henry has his friend, Brainy Brian, forge a note from his mother claiming that his cat ate it. His teacher, Miss Battle-Axe, sees through Henry's ruse because the word "homework" is spelled correctly, something Henry struggles with. While Henry is in detention, his friends join him, and they rehearse for a school talent contest; they are interrupted by Miss Oddbod, the Headmistress, and two school inspectors.

Meanwhile, Vic Van Wrinkle, the corrupt headmaster of the prestigious Brick House School, influences the school inspectors to close Ashton Primary, the school Henry attends, hoping to profit from an influx of new students. The inspectors encourage Henry's pranks and even frame him, resulting in Miss Battle-Axe and her colleague, Miss Lovely, being dismissed for failing to enforce discipline. Furthermore, Miss Oddbod prohibits Henry's band, the Zero Zombies, from entering the talent contest.

With Ashton Primary on the brink of closing, Henry's Great Aunt Greta offers to pay for Henry to attend Our Lady Giddiantus, an all-girls private academy (as she has long been under the impression Henry is a girl) and his younger brother, Perfect Peter, to attend Brick House. Miss Lovely applies for a job at Brick House and spies on Van Wrinkle; she is captured, but passes notes about Van Wrinkle's plan to Peter. After Henry escapes from his new school with the help of Margaret, who has also been transferred there, he and the Zero Zombies perform in the talent contest and win. Henry thinks that their victory will garner enough fame to keep Ashton Primary open, but Miss Oddbod tells him that fame alone cannot change the school's fate.

Henry later receives an invitation to compete on the game show 2Cool4School, and Margaret realizes that the cash prize could be used to bribe the school inspectors into leaving Ashton Primary alone. In the final round of the game, Henry is confronted by Miss Battle-Axe, who challenges him to spell "homework". Using Miss Battle-Axe's phrase "Oh, Henry" as a mnemonic device, he finally spells the word correctly and wins. To Henry's surprise, Miss Battle-Axe reveals that she is a former 2Cool4School champion herself and she used her connections to orchestrate Henry’s appearance on the show.

Meanwhile, Peter and his friends try to rescue Miss Lovely, but are captured by Van Wrinkle. Miss Lovely tricks Van Wrinkle into explaining his plan while Peter has her mobile phone on a call with Miss Oddbod, who contacts the police. Van Wrinkle attempts to escape, but falls over due to Peter tying his shoelaces together; he and the school inspectors are arrested. Miss Oddbod declines the cash prize, which is instead used to throw a large party at Henry's house.

== Cast ==
- Theo Stevenson as Horrid Henry, a mischievous boy considered horrid due to his behaviour
- Anjelica Huston as Miss Boudicca Battle-Axe, the teacher of Henry and his class who despises him, yet is determined to teach him something
- Scarlett Stitt as Moody Margaret, the archenemy of Henry who lives next door to him and the Leader of the Secret Club
- Ross Marron as Perfect Peter, the younger brother of Henry who is good and well-behaved
- Richard E. Grant as Vic Van Wrinkle, the evil Headmaster of Brick House
- Parminder Nagra as Miss Lovely, Perfect Peter's teacher who is kind and optimistic
- Kimberley Walsh as Prissy Polly, Henry and Peter's older cousin
- Mathew Horne as Dad, the father of Henry and Peter and the husband of Mum
- Siobhan Hayes as Mum, the mother of Henry and Peter and the wife of Dad
- Rebecca Front as Miss Cynthia Oddbod, the strict and no-nonsense Headmistress of Ashton Primary who often confiscates toys from her students
- David Schneider as Soggy Sid, the PE teacher at Ashton Primary who despises Henry
- Dick and Dom as the co-presenters of 2 Cool 4 School
- Noel Fielding as Ed Banger, the lead singer of the Killer Boy Rats, Henry's favourite band
- Jo Brand as Greasy Greta, a dinner lady who serves Henry vegetable stew on 2 Cool 4 School
- Prunella Scales as Great Aunt Greta, Henry's great aunt in the belief that Henry is a girl named Henrietta and that Peter is a teenager
- Helen Lederer as Rich Aunt Ruby, the sister of Mum, the sister-in-law of Dad, the mother of Stuck-up Steve and the wealthy aunt of Henry and Peter
- Lloyd Howells as Rude Ralph, Henry's best friend
- Jack Sanders as Aerobic Al, an athletic boy who is good friends with Henry
- Connor O'Mara as Beefy Bert, a friend of Henry's who lacks intelligence and only ever says "I dunno"
- Reuben Lee as Brainy Brian, a friend of Henry's and the most intelligent student in his class
- Billy Kennedy as Weepy William, a friend of Henry's and a sensitive boy who often gets emotional
- Helena Barlow as Sour Susan, Moody Margaret's best friend who usually copies what she says
- Nikita Mistry as Gorgeous Gurinder, a vain girl who is friends with Margaret
- Ela Warburton as Lazy Linda, a lazy girl who often sleeps in class and a friend of Margaret's
- Nethra Tilakumara as Singing Soraya, a girl who enjoys singing and often sings her sentences and a friend of Margaret's
- Metin and Timur Ahmet as the School Inspectors, the Henchmen of Vic Van Wrinkle who are being paid to help get Ashton Primary closed down
- Frank Kauer as Spotless Sam, a tidy boy and one of Peter's best friends
- Joshua-James Thomas as Goody Goody Gordon, a well-behaved boy and one of Peter's best friends
- Gabriel Werb as Tidy Ted, a tidy boy who is best friends with Peter
- Tyger Drew-Honey as Stuck-up Steve, the snobby older cousin of Henry and Peter, the son of Rich Aunt Ruby and the nephew of Mum and Dad who attends Brick House and is heavily spoiled by his mother
- Tamsin Heatley as Miss Tutu, the dance teacher at Ashton Primary who teaches some students ballet
  - Heatley also provides the voice of Fang, Henry's vicious pet hamster.
- Philip Pope as Moody Margaret's Dad, the lenient father of Margaret who spoils her
- Kia Pegg as Vicious Vicky, the younger sister of Sour Susan who frequently bites others
- Grant Logan as Wheely Walter, the Science teacher at Ashton Primary who uses a wheelchair
- Lily and Sasha Demetriou Ottaway as Vomiting Vera, the baby daughter of Prissy Polly
- Lizzie Waterworth as Nitty Nora, the nit nurse at Ashton Primary

== Production ==
Horrid Henry: The Movie was filmed in London for seven weeks in November and December in 2010. It was reported to be the first British children's film to be shot in 3D.

== Soundtrack ==
Horrid Henry: The Movie: Original Motion Picture Soundtrack

Soundtrack album by Various artists
- Released: 1 January 2011
- Recorded: 2010
- Genre: Pop rock
- Label: Universal Music TV
- Producer: Various artists

Singles from Horrid Henry: The Movie: Original Motion Picture Soundtrack
- 1. "Too Cool for School" Released: 2011

The soundtrack was released on 1 January 2011, by Universal Music TV.

Track	Song	Artists
1	"Too Cool for School"	Theo Stevenson
2	"Everybody Dance"	Kimberley Walsh
3	"Boys and Girls"	Pixie Lott
4	"Party Rock Anthem"	LMFAO featuring Lauren Bennett and GoonRock
5	"(Gonna Be a) Rockstar"	Theo Stevenson
6	"Beat of My Drum"	Nicola Roberts
7	"One Time"	Justin Bieber
8	"Shine a Light" (Radio Edit)	McFly ft. Taio Cruz
9	"When I'm King"	Emma Tate, Tamsin Heatley, Wayne Forester and Theo Stevenson
10	"Get Down"	Twenty Twenty
11	"Special Brew"	Bad Manners
12	"Horrid Homework Haze"	Killer Boy Rats
13	"I Gotta Feeling" (Movie Soundtrack Edit)	Black Eyed Peas
14	"Rock Down"	Free Amigos
15	"Ego"	The Saturdays
16	"Underdog"	You Me at Six
17	"Monster"	The Automatic
18	"Dynamite"	Taio Cruz
19	"All the Small Things (Blink-182 cover)"	Jedward
20	"I'm Horrid Henry"	Killer Boy Rats (Lucinda Whiteley, Matthew Corbett and Mike Wilkie)

== Release ==
Horrid Henry: The Movie was theatrically released on 29 July 2011, in the United Kingdom by Vertigo Films. It was later released on DVD and Blu-ray on 28 November, that same year, in the United Kingdom.

== Reception ==
=== Box office ===
The film opened at #5 in the box office in the United Kingdom with £1.3 million, in a Top 10 led by Harry Potter and the Deathly Hallows – Part 2 and Captain America: The First Avenger. It was knocked down the next week to #7, by Super 8 and Mr. Popper's Penguins.

=== Critical response ===
On the review aggregator website Rotten Tomatoes, 9% of 22 critics' reviews are positive, with an average rating of 3.60/10. Common criticisms included the unfunny, juvenile humour, stuttering plot, and unimaginative use of stereoscopy. The bright colour palette was widely praised, but generally said to be wasted, given the overall low quality of the film.

Leslie Felperin of Variety stated: 'Thinly scripted, even for a kidpic, but luridly colored enough to keep even nap needing tots (or parents) awake, this sophomore effort by Brit helmer Nick Moore (Wild Child) reps something of a waste of its impressive roster of supporting thespian talent, while its use of 3D is likewise less than imaginative.'

Derek Adams offered the film mild praise in Time Out: "Horrid Henry is indelibly flawed and disorderly in tone but not devoid of rambunctious charm". When interviewed on Desert Island Discs by Kirsty Young, Horrid Henry book author Francesca Simon stated, 'I haven't seen [the film]...I had nothing to do with it.' She would also express her dislike of the film during a Q&A at the Edinburgh International Book Festival in August 2019, stating that it differed from the books. Sandie Angulo Chen of Common Sense Media gave this a film two stars out of five, describing as a "forgettable British kid comedy [that] is pretty horrid indeed."

== Future ==
In an interview with Novel Entertainment, aired out in January 2020 after the success of Horrid Henry: The Movie being aired on Nicktoons, executive producer Lucinda Whiteley said she was "absolutely [working on a sequel]! And not just one but two sequels, as the story of how Henry ends up saving the world needs more than just 90 minutes!"

== See also ==
- Horrid Henry
- Horrid Henry (TV series)
