= Fred Claus =

2007 American Christmas comedy film

- Theatrical release poster
- Directed by: David Dobkin
- Screenplay by: Dan Fogelman
- Story by: Jessie Nelson; Dan Fogelman
- Produced by: Joel Silver; Jessie Nelson; David Dobkin
- Starring: Vince Vaughn; Paul Giamatti; Miranda Richardson; John Michael Higgins; Elizabeth Banks; Rachel Weisz; Kathy Bates; Kevin Spacey
- Cinematography: Remi Adefarasin
- Edited by: Mark Livolsi
- Music by: Christophe Beck; Alan Silvestri (uncredited, score portions of MouseHunt)
- Production companies: Silver Pictures; David Dobkin Pictures; Jessie Nelson Productions
- Distributed by: Warner Bros. Pictures
- Release date: November 9, 2007
- Running time: 116 minutes
- Country: United States
- Language: English
- Budget: $100 million
- Box office: $97.8 million

Fred Claus is a 2007 American Christmas comedy film directed by David Dobkin, written by Dan Fogelman from a story by Fogelman and Jessie Nelson, and starring Vince Vaughn, Paul Giamatti, Miranda Richardson, John Michael Higgins, Elizabeth Banks, Rachel Weisz, Kathy Bates, Trevor Peacock, Ludacris, and Kevin Spacey. It is loosely based on the poem "A legend of Santa and his brother Fred" written by Donald Henkel.

The film was first announced in October 2005 with Mike Mitchell attached to direct.

The film was released in the United States on November 9, 2007, by Warner Bros. Pictures. It received mixed-to-negative reviews from critics and was a box-office bomb, grossing $97.8 million worldwide against the production budget of $100 million.

== Plot ==
In the Middle Ages, the young boy Fred Claus eventually gets a younger brother named Nick. He grows up in the shadow of the younger, due to Nick's selfless and kind attitude which constantly wins the approval of their family over Fred. Their strained relationship is permanently damaged when Nick cuts down a tree, inadvertently destroying the bird house in which Fred's bird Chirp Chirp lived. Due to Nick's generous and helpful personality, he is deemed a Saint, and the family is gifted with immortality.

In the present, Saint Nick has become the modern-day Santa Claus, delivering gifts to the children of the world, while Fred has become a Chicago repossession agent. He lives alone and is friends with orphan Samuel "Slam" Gibbons. In an attempt to raise seed money to open an illegal casino plan, Fred is arrested for collecting donations, similar to a Salvation Army employee, but has no permit. His girlfriend Wanda then breaks up with him, as he unintentionally stood her up for her birthday dinner, and he is fired from his job.

Fred asks Nick for bail and the seed money. He only agrees on the condition that he comes to the North Pole to work for the money. Just before leaving, Slam asks Fred to pretend to be his father but ends up being taken away and sent to an orphanage.

Head Elf Willie escorts Fred to the North Pole. Nick gives him the task of assigning children as naughty or nice based on their behavior. Efficiency expert Clyde Northcutt, from an agency which monitors the activities of supernatural entities, arrives to analyze the North Pole's dwindling performance on a three-strike assessment.

Fred picks a fight with the workshop's DJ Donnie after he plays "Here Comes Santa Claus" non-stop. The disruption causes a disruption that leads to Northcutt assigning the North Pole their first strike. Nick sandbags Fred into having dinner that evening with their parents.

Later that night, Northcutt shreds the children's letters. Fred is falsely blamed for "losing" them, and the lack of backup copies leads to a second strike. Not believing Fred's denials, Nick has security abduct Fred, and brings him to an intervention, attended by their parents, Nick's wife Annette, Wanda, and a psychologist. Angered by Fred's self-centeredness and his obnoxious attitude, Wanda leaves.

Fred grows upset by Wanda's departure from the intervention, so insults Nick and lambasts his parents for their favoritism. Following the intervention, Northcutt messes with Fred’s head, causing further resentment of Nick. Later, Fred sees Slam at the top of the Naughty List, then sees that Slam’s bad behavior is due to being bullied at the orphanage. He assigns every naughty child as nice.

The brothers get into a fight over Fred's decision, which leads to Nick injuring his back, afterward Fred bitterly tells Nick he wishes he was never born. Unable to now produce enough gifts for every good child, the North Pole falls far behind schedule, leading Northcutt to assign the third strike, shutting down the workshop. Fred leaves, taking his money and a gift from Nick.

Fred opens his gift: a replica of the birdhouse Chirp Chirp lived in and a note from Nick apologizing for cutting down the tree. With a change of heart, he uses the seed money to make his way back to the North Pole. There, Fred motivates the elves to make as many gifts as possible, having them focus on simple toys.

Due to his back injury, Nick is unable to deliver gifts. Feeling guilty, Fred decides to deliver the presents (as only a Claus can deliver them). He reminds Nick that naughty kids are not bad, just kids going through bad situations, and suggests every child deserves a gift on Christmas. Fred gets the workshop to quickly make simple gifts so that every child gets a toy.

Fred and Willie begin to deliver the gifts, but Northcutt sabotages their efforts and fires the elves. Nick confronts him and, realizes he was also bullied as a child, leading him to lash out at others. He apologizes to Northcutt for putting him at the top of the Naughty List in 1968, so gives him the Superman cape he had asked for as a child.

Disguised as Santa, Fred visits Slam and gives him the puppy he wanted for Christmas and advice to become a better person. After every gift is delivered, Fred returns to the North Pole while Willie finally starts a relationship with the tall elf, Charlene, Santa's "little" helper. Fred reconciles with Wanda and takes her to Paris.

The next Christmas, Fred and Nick have made amends and the now-reformed Northcutt has been hired to work at the North Pole as quality control, while Slam is adopted. On New Year’s Eve the Claus family reunite, and Chirp Chirp finally returns to the Clauses, living in the birdhouse Nick gave Fred.

== Cast ==
- Vince Vaughn as Frederick "Fred" Claus
  - Jordon Hull as 6 year old Fred
  - Liam James as 12 year old Fred
- Paul Giamatti as Nicholas "Nick"/"Santa" Claus, Fred's younger brother.
  - Theo Stevenson as 6 year old Nick
- Miranda Richardson as Mrs. Annette Claus, Nick's wife.
- John Michael Higgins as Willie, Nick's head elf whom Fred befriends and helps to hook up with Charlene.
- Elizabeth Banks as Charlene, a tall, blonde elf with whom Willie becomes enamored.
- Chris "Ludacris" Bridges as DJ Donnie
- Bobb'e J. Thompson as Samuel "Slam" Gibbons, a young orphan boy that Fred mentors.
- Rachel Weisz as Wanda Blinkowski, Fred's girlfriend and a parking enforcement officer.
- Kathy Bates as Mother Claus, Fred and Nick's mother.
- Kevin Spacey as Clyde Archibald Northcutt, an efficiency expert who comes to assess the situation at the North Pole.
- Stephen Baldwin as Himself at a Siblings Anonymous meeting Fred attends.
- Roger Clinton as Himself at a Siblings Anonymous meeting Fred attends.
- Frank Stallone as Himself at a Siblings Anonymous meeting Fred attends.
- Allan Corduner as Dr. Greg Goldfarb
- Trevor Peacock as Father Claus, Fred and Nick's father. Peacock also serves as the narrator.
- Jeremy Swift as Bob Elf
- Elizabeth Berrington as Linda Elf
- Dylan Minnette, Justin McEwen, and Tyler Kelley as orphanage kids
- Jeffrey Dean Morgan (cameo) as unnamed man getting parking ticket.
- Ethan Cutkosky as Carl
- Burn Gorman as an Elf
- Rusty Goffe as Bartender Elf

== Soundtrack ==
Original music is composed by Christophe Beck, although portions of Alan Silvestri's Mouse Hunt score also appear. In addition to starring in the film, Ludacris contributed an original song titled "Ludacrismas", which includes portions of "Here Comes Santa Claus". The film also features Elvis Presley's 1969 single "Rubberneckin'".

== Reception ==
=== Critical response ===
On the review aggregator website Rotten Tomatoes, 20% of 141 critics' reviews are positive, with an average rating of 4.3/10. The website's consensus reads: "A slew of talent is wasted in this contrived and overly sentimental Christmas film, which can't quite get the balance between slapstick humor and schmaltzy uplift." Metacritic, which uses a weighted average, assigned the film a score of 42 out of 100, based on 31 critics, indicating "mixed or average" reviews. Audiences polled by CinemaScore gave the film an average grade of "B" on an A+ to F scale.

=== Box office ===
The film grossed $18,515,473 in its first weekend, and closed on February 14, 2008, with a final gross of $72,006,777 in North America and another $25,831,572 in other territories for a total worldwide gross of $97,838,349. The film became number 1 in the UK on its first weekend, bringing in £1.93m. It held the top spot for one week until it was surpassed by The Golden Compass.

== Home media ==
Fred Claus was released on DVD and Blu-ray on November 25, 2008, by Warner Home Video.

== See also ==
- List of Christmas films
- Santa Claus in film
