= The Roly Mo Show =

2004 British educational television series

- Genre: Preschool
- Country of origin: United Kingdom
- Original language: English
- No. of series: 1
- No. of episodes: 100

Production
- Production location: Bray Studios
- Running time: 15 minutes
- Production company: Novel Entertainment (Note: As Novel Finders Limited)

Original release
- Network: CBeebies
- Release: 8 November 2004 – 25 March 2005

Related
- Fimbles

The Roly Mo Show is a British children's television series produced by Novel Entertainment and aired on CBeebies. The series is set in the home of Roly Mo, where his niece and his friends come over each day to visit him. It is an educational series, with a primary focus on literature. It is a spin-off of Fimbles.

The Roly Mo Show was broadcast on CBeebies from 8 November 2004 up to and including 25 March 2005, with reruns continuing until 2009. The series consists of 100 episodes, each 15 minutes in length.

== Overview ==
The Roly Mo Show is set underneath the fictional "Fimble Valley". Roly Mo is a mole who lives under Fimble Valley, and he is often visited by Little Bo, his niece; Yugo and Migo, two energetic 'snoots'; and Rockit, an inquisitive tree frog.

=== Episode structure ===
1. Little Bo is visiting Roly Mo after school. She hangs up her rucksack and hat and goes down a slide into the main part of Roly Mo's house.
2. One of the characters has a problem; this is the main plot element throughout the episode.
3. Little Bo looks in her 'Busy Book', starting the segment of an animated Fimble solving an educational puzzle.
4. Someone reads a story from Roly Mo's library, preceded by the "When You Take a Look Inside a Book" song. Most of the time, the storyteller is Roly Mo, although sometimes it is Little Bo, Rockit, Yugo and Migo or a combination. The story is related to the problem and often gives an idea for its solution.
5. The problem is solved, often coinciding with a song.
6. The show closes with voice-overs during the credits, which are often humorous or provide further closure.

== Cast and characters ==
- Wayne Forester as Roly Mo, the titular character of the show. He is a mole with purple and green stripes who loves to read. He made many appearances in Fimbles prior to The Roly Mo Show.
- Tamsin Heatley as Little Bo, the niece of Roly Mo. She is a young and highly intelligent mole with pink and purple stripes.
- Philip Pope as Yugo, an energetic orange fox-like creature with yellow stripes. He is a member of a rare species known as 'snoots'.
- Duncan Wisbey as Migo, an energetic yellow snoot with red spots.
- Wayne Forester as Rockit, a boisterous blue tree frog. He appeared often in Fimbles prior to The Roly Mo Show.

== Episodes ==
=== Series overview ===
Series	Episodes	Originally released	
Series	Episodes	First released	Last released
1	100	8 November 2004	25 March 2005

=== Episode list ===
1. "Sandwiches"
2. "Growing Up"
3. "Bibby"
4. "Hands in Gloves"
5. "Little Bo Peep!"
6. "Rockit's Birthday"
7. "Teatime!"
8. "Bookworm"
9. "Sleepover"
10. "Lights Out!"
11. "Umbrellas"
12. "Jigsaws"
13. "Afternoon Nap"
14. "Babysitting"
15. "Beaches"
16. "Painting"
17. "Seeds"
18. "Tidying Up"
19. "Torches"
20. "Yugo's Lazy Days"
21. "You Can Drive My Car"
22. "Little Bo Riding Hood"
23. "Making Music"
24. "Onions"
25. "Rollerskating"
26. "Thunderstorm"
27. "Washing Up"
28. "Scarves Tale"
29. "Dressing Up"
30. "Cuddlies Picnic"
31. "Homeworks"
32. "Little Bo's Sad"
33. "Little Bo's Cold"
34. "Snudge is Missing!"
35. "Roly's Sleepy Day"
36. "Playtime!"
37. "Guess Who's Coming For Tea?"
38. "Bathtime!"
39. "What's That Sound?"
40. "What a Card!"
41. "Little Bo's Birthday"
42. "Peace and Quiet"
43. "Treasure Hunt"
44. "Red Letters Day"
45. "Sports Day"
46. "Ssshh!"
47. "Mine!"
48. "Bump"
49. "Dear Diary"
50. "Rushing About"
51. "Library Tidy Up"
52. "Too Cold!"
53. "The First Time"
54. "Tickly Bits"
55. "Small is Beautiful"
56. "What's in Little Bo's Rucksack?"
57. "When the Rain Comes"
58. "Snap!"
59. "Surprise!"
60. "Too Hot!"
61. "Hiding Hiccups"
62. "Music Class"
63. "Spend, Spend, Spend"
64. "Oh Yes It Is!"
65. "Come Dancing"
66. "Looking For Clues"
67. "Sweet Dreams"
68. "Fimbles Storytime"
69. "Rubber Moles"
70. "Think of a Numbers"
71. "What Happens Next?"
72. "For True Life"
73. "Imagine"
74. "When I'm 64"
75. "Strings Tale"
76. "The Collector"
77. "Four Seasons in One Day"
78. "Like a Rolling Stones"
79. "Three Amigos"
80. "Can I Help You?"
81. "Picnic in the Garden"
82. "Pleased to Meet You"
83. "Blow Out"
84. "Everyone's a Winner!"
85. "Perfect Days"
86. "My Best Things"
87. "Out of the Blues"
88. "No Place Like Home"
89. "Just a Minute!"
90. "Show and Tell"
91. "Double Identity"
92. "Doctor Who?"
93. "Valley of the Moles"
94. "Stick 'em Up"
95. "On Being a Snoot"
96. "Hide and Peep"
97. "Happy Families"
98. "Snoot the Moon"
99. "Word Up!"
100. "Chinese Whispers"

== Other media ==
A short spin-off series was created by Novel Entertainment, named Storytime with Roly Mo. It consists of 30 episodes, each 2 minutes in length. Each episode is about a story that Roly Mo reads to Little Bo.

The characters of The Roly Mo Show have been referenced many times in the TV series Horrid Henry, as both shows were created by Novel Entertainment.

On 28 December 2007, a special puppet edition of The Weakest Link aired on BBC One, featuring Roly Mo as one of the contestants. Prior to the fourth round, he led the other puppets in a rendition of the "When You Take a Look Inside a Book" song at the request of Anne Robinson and the audience. He was voted off after the fifth round.

== Awards ==
- Royal Television Society Educational Television Awards 2004
  - Nominated for Best Early Years Programme
- Royal Television Society Educational Television Awards 2005
  - Nominated for Best Schools Programme - 0–5 Years (for the episode Imagine)
