= Strike (2018 film) =

2018 animated stop-motion film directed by Trevor Hardy

- Film poster
- Directed by: Trevor Hardy
- Screenplay by: Neil James
- Story by: Trevor Hardy; Neil James; Edward Catchpole; Jeremy Davis
- Produced by: Jeremy Davis; Edward Catchpole
- Starring: Lizzie Waterworth-Santo; Jacob Scipio; Ken Stott
- Cinematography: Chris Roe; Trevor Hardy
- Edited by: Daniel Harding
- Music by: Peter Michael Davison
- Animation by: Daniel Wilkinson; Tommy Vaughn; Will Hodge
- Production companies: Pigbird; Gigglefish Animation Studios; Homesick Angel
- Distributed by: Bright Spark
- Release dates: 16 December 2018 (Carrefour du Cinéma d'Animation); 16 March 2019
- Running time: 101 minutes
- Country: United Kingdom
- Language: English

Strike is a 2018 British stop-motion animated film directed by Trevor Hardy. It tells the story of Mungo, a young mole who aspires to become a footballer. It is the first feature film made by Gigglefish Studios. The film premiered at the 2018 Carrefour du cinéma d'animation.

== Voice cast ==
- Lizzie Waterworth-Santo as Mungo
- Alex Kelly as Hedy
- Naomi McDonald as Ryan
- Jacob Scipio as Jay "Mac" Mackenzie
- Ken Stott as the boss, A Villainous Persian Cat, who is the boss of Raven Corp
- Beth Chalmers as Xenia, a Stoat who acts as the intel of the boss
- Jordon Long as Lewie, a Bull who acts as the muscle of Raven Corp

== Plot ==
The movie starts with Mungo, who is a young mole with dreams to become a football star.
