= Reuniting the Rubins =

- Directed by: Yoav Factor
- Written by: Yoav Factor
- Produced by: Yoav Factor; Jonathan Weissler
- Starring: Timothy Spall; Honor Blackman; James Callis; Theo Stevenson; Rhona Mitra; Blake Harrison
- Cinematography: Miles Cook
- Edited by: Anthony Stadler
- Production companies: Balagan Productions; Factor Films
- Distributed by: monterey media inc. (US); Kaleidoscope Entertainment (UK)
- Release date: 1 July 2010
- Country: United Kingdom
- Language: English
- Budget: $7.5 million
- Box office: $12,631

Reuniting the Rubins is a 2010 film directed by Yoav Factor and starring Timothy Spall, Rhona Mitra, and James Callis. The majority of the film was shot in Radlett, Hertfordshire, England and South Africa.

== Plot ==
The film is a family comedy chronicling a reluctantly Jewish man (Timothy Spall) who tries to re-unite his dysfunctional family in time for the Jewish celebration of Pesach so as to appease his ailing mother Honor Blackman. Although they are all from the same family his estranged children hardly seem like they are from the same planet. He must reunite his son the capitalist James Callis, his daughter the eco-warrior Rhona Mitra, his son the Buddhist Monk, and his last son, a born-again rabbi.

== Principal cast ==
- Timothy Spall as Lenny Rubins
- James Callis as Danny Rubins
- Rhona Mitra as Andie Rubins
- Honor Blackman as Gran Rubins
- Hugh O'Conor as Yona Rubins
- Asier Newman as Clarity Rubins
- Loo Brealey as Miri Rubins
- Blake Harrison as Nick
- Theo Stevenson as Jake Rubins
- Eloise Derbyshire as young Andie Rubins
- Anthony Cowan as Rabbi's student (extra)

== Release ==
In September 2011, Monterey Media bought the United States distribution rights from Kaleidoscope Film Distribution.

=== Festivals ===
Reuniting the Rubins was selected to screen at the following festivals

- Washington DC Jewish Film Festival
- East Bay Jewish Film Festival
- Broward County Jewish Film Festival
- Pioneer Valley Jewish Film Festival
- Miami Jewish Film Festival
- Worcester Jewish Film Festival
- Lenore Marwil Jewish Film Festival
- Grand Rapids Jewish Film Festival
- New Jersey Jewish Film Festival
- Cherry Hill Jewish Film Festival
- Westchester Jewish Film Festival
