= All Stars (2013 film) =

- Theatrical release poster
- Directed by: Ben Gregor
- Written by: Paul Gerstenberger
- Produced by: Allan Niblo; James Richardson; Jim Spencer
- Starring: Theo Stevenson; Akai; Fleur Houdijk; Dominic Herman-Day; Amelia Clarkson; Gamal Toseafa; Ashley Jensen; Ashley Walters; Kevin Bishop; Hugh Dennis; Mark Heap; Javine Hylton; Kimberley Walsh; John Barrowman
- Cinematography: Ben Wheeler
- Edited by: Jono Griffith
- Music by: Simon Woodgate
- Distributed by: Vertigo Films
- Release date: 3 May 2013
- Running time: 106 minutes
- Country: United Kingdom
- Language: English

All Stars is a 2013 British dance film directed by Ben Gregor. The film was released in the United Kingdom on 3 May 2013, and stars an ensemble cast led by Theo Stevenson and Akai as two children trying to save their youth centre that is under threat of closure.

== Synopsis ==
When their youth centre is threatened with Closure, six children decide to come together and put on a dance show. Each has their own reason for performing aside from saving the youth centre. Jaden (Akai) loves to dance but is forbidden to do so by his strict parents Kelly (Javine Hylton) and Mark (Ashley Walters). Ethan (Theo Stevenson) hopes to impress the girl of his dreams. Amy (Fleur Houdijk) holds a secret crush on Ethan and hopes to use this as an outlet for the emotions she has from taking care of her father, who is suffering from depression. They're helped along by Brian (Gamal Toseafa), Tim (Dominic Herman-Day), and Rebecca (Amelia Clarkson), and they all hope to manage to save the centre and make their hopes come true.

== Cast ==
- Theo Stevenson as Ethan
- Akai as Jaden
- Ashley Jensen as Gina
- Fleur Houdijk as Amy
- Dominic Herman-Day as Tim
- Amelia Clarkson as Rebecca
- Gamal Toseafa as Brian
- Summer Davies as Sadie
- Kimberley Walsh as Trish, Ethan's mother
- Kevin Bishop as Andy, Ethan's father
- Kieran Lai as Kurt
- Ashley Walters as Mark, Jaden's father
- Javine Hylton as Kelly, Jaden's mother
- John Barrowman as Amy's dad
- Mark Heap as Simon Tarrington
- Hugh Dennis as Mr. Hart
- Simon Farnaby as the Foreman
- Amit Shah as the Science Teacher

== Reception ==
Critical reception for All Stars was mixed. On Rotten Tomatoes it has an approval rating of 43% based on reviews from 23 critics. Den of Geek panned the film and wrote "Very young kids might find some enjoyment in All Stars, but it's corny, light-entertainment cinema at its most irritating."
