= Peter Michael Davison =

British composer, orchestrator, arranger and conductor

- Born: Sunderland, UK
- Occupation(s): Composer, Orchestrator, Arranger & Conductor
- Website: petermichaeldavison.com

Peter Michael Davison is a British composer, orchestrator, arranger and conductor. His most notable work includes his scores for the stop motion animation Strike! (2018) and Australian film Emu Runner (2018).

== Work ==
=== Film and television ===
In 2018, Davison composed, orchestrated and conducted for the stop motion animation film Strike!; produced by Gigglefish Studios and a select team from Aardman. The film was part of Seville Film Festival’s Official Selection in 2018.

Davison’s Australian success grew after scoring the film, Emu Runner (2018), directed by Imogen Thomas. Davison also wrote additional music for Mike Brook’s “rockumentary” about The Church’s front man; Something Quite Peculiar: The Life and Times of Steve Kilbey (2017). He is also a composer with Australian music production company beatboxmusic.com.

=== Games ===
Davison is a known orchestrator and conductor on the PS4 epic, Horizon Zero Dawn (2017). Davison worked with double Ivor Novello winner Joris de Man on the project. In 2017, he also worked with de Man and the City of Prague Philharmonic Orchestra as a conductor and orchestrator on Animortal’s Chuck Steel: Night of the Trampires. Davison is also currently composing music for Jagex's RuneScape: Dragonwilds.

=== Off-screen work ===
In 2017, he conducted the Royal Liverpool Philharmonic’s Ensemble 10/10. Davison also arranged and orchestrated the 1960s seminal album by Roger McGough and Andy Roberts; Summer with Monika.

Davison has written for Judie Tzuke, Oysterband and Claire Martin OBE. The latter included her 2014 tour and collaborative work on the album ‘Time and Place’. His arrangements for Martin and the Montpellier Cello Quartet were performed at Kings Place, the Royal Albert Hall and Union Chapel in London. Davison’s arrangement of David Bowie’s ‘Man Who Sold the World’ for Claire Martin’s album featured several high-profile artists including Joe Stilgoe, Laurence Cottle, Richard Rodney Bennett, Gareth Williams, and Geoffrey Keezer.
