= Trengellick Rising =

British short film

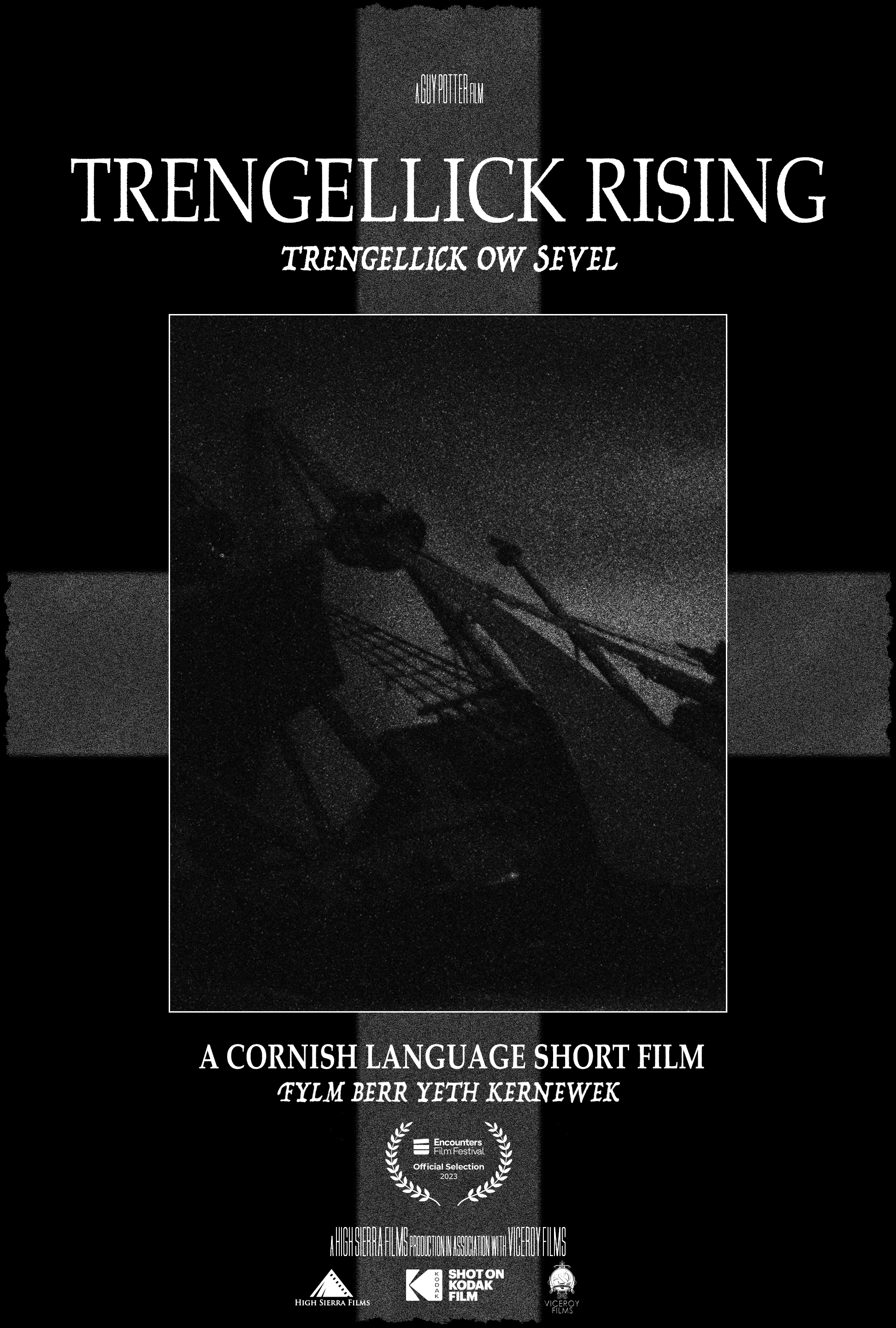
- Official Poster (2023)
- Directed by: Guy Potter
- Written by: Guy Potter
- Starring: Jeremy Manning; Guy Potter; Zennor Rose; Michael Fenner
- Cinematography: William Pope
- Music by: Peter Arthur Moon
- Production company: High Sierra Films
- Release date: 2023
- Country: United Kingdom
- Language: Cornish
- Budget: £14,000

Trengellick Rising is a 2023 Cornish language short film written and directed by Guy Potter. The film was successfully funded via Kickstarter and has received support from Cornwall Council, Falmouth University and the Sound/Image Cinema Lab.

== Synopsis ==
Set in 1735, the film follows Private Gerren Pascoe, who is exiled without trial to a distant coastal outpost to scout enemy vessels.

== Cast ==
- Guy Potter as Private Gerren Pascoe
- Jeremy Manning as Jago Helghyer
- Zennor Rose as Persephone Cadieux
- Michael Fenner as The Constable
- Gwilym Evans as Jeffra
- Bryn Evans as Branok
- Kamil Simpson as Kensa
- Arthur Southwick as Peran
- Edie Moles as The Messenger

== Production ==
=== Development ===
Development of the film began in late 2019, with Guy Potter writing the script as a follow up to his micro-short Prey, a film created on assignment for Sundance Collab. Intending to expand on the format of Prey, it was decided that Trengellick Rising should also be shot on black and white 16mm film, and hand-processed in much the same way. This became an integral part of the Trengellick Rising production.

In March 2021, it was decided that the film be performed entirely in Kernewek, or the Cornish language. The script was translated by Cornwall Council and the Trengellick Rising fundraising page was launched on Kickstarter.

On 1 April 2021, Trengellick Rising was successfully financed through Kickstarter, achieving 145% of its target. The project raised £6,550 from 103 different pledges from all over the world.

=== Filming ===
Filming began in August 2021 in locations around Bodmin (including Jamaica Inn) as well as near the Hartland Heritage Coast. Filming on the project wrapped a few weeks later.

=== Processing and developing ===
In October 2021, the director Guy Potter began to develop the footage by hand, in a makeshift darkroom at home. Mixing the chemicals and processing the film himself, he developed over 3,500 ft, over a kilometre of film negative. In an interview with BBC Cornwall, he described this as “the hardest part of the production so far” but that the resulting aesthetic was “scratchy, raw and rough around the edges, much like the story itself.”

=== Post-production ===
In August 2023 post-production finished on the project after a year of editing and sound design. It was subsequently entered into festivals and released in cinemas.

== Release ==
In September 2023 Trengellick Rising was accepted and screened at the BAFTA/Oscar Qualifying Encounters Film Festival and screened as part of their South West Programme. Its festival journey continued into 2023 and it was subsequently released in Merlin Cinemas in Cornwall in January 2024 with an expanded cinematic release in March 2024.
