= Fimbles =

2002 British children's television series

- Created by: Sarah Hayes
- Developed by: BBC Broadcast
- Written by: Simon Davies; Alan MacDoanld; Jan Page; Lucinda Whiteley; Toby Rushton; Mike Watts; Christine Secombe; Tamsin Heatley; Rosemary Barratt; Lucy Murphy; Adrian Hedley; Alison Stewart
- Directed by: Helen Sheppard; Jamie Langton; Vivienne Cozens; Adrian Hedley; Alison Stewart; Peter Leslie
- Voices of: Aidan Cook; Shelley Longworth; Kate Harbour; Tamsin Heatley; Wayne Forester
- Theme music composer: Paul K. Joyce
- Composers: Paul K. Joyce; Kick Production; Philip Pope; Lester Barnes
- Country of origin: United Kingdom
- Original language: English
- No. of series: 2
- No. of episodes: 200

Production
- Executive producers: Clare Elstow; Mike Watts; David Hamilton
- Producer: Lucinda Whiteley
- Production location: Bray Studios
- Camera setup: Ian Baldwin; Alan Beal; Paul Freeman; Steve Jellyman and others
- Running time: 20 minutes approx
- Production company: Novel Entertainment

Original release
- Network: CBeebies
- Release: 23 September 2002 – 24 September 2004

Related
- The Roly Mo Show

Fimbles is a British children's television series created and produced by Novel Entertainment for the BBC. The series has 200 episodes, airing from September 23, 2002 to September 24, 2004 with repeats airing until early 2012 on CBeebies. The Fimbles are Fimbo, Florrie and Baby Pom, three magical characters who all live in a bright, lush, and colourful place called Fimble Valley. The production of the show itself was filmed at Bray Studios in Berkshire.

The programme has been broadcast in over 100 countries, including the countries Canada, China and all the countries in mainland Europe.

== Overview ==
The series features three magical hippopotamus/pig/tapir-like hybrid creatures called the "Fimbles", who are portrayed by "skin" actors in complex, fluffy animatronic suits and all look quite similar apart from their colour and size. The characters explore Fimble Valley and can find things through a special "sixth sense". When the Tinkling Tree tinkles its bell-like blossoms, it makes the nose, fingers and topknot of one or more Fimbles twitch as they get the "Fimbling Feeling". This tells the character(s) that they are going to find something. It may be a natural phenomenon—a patch of sunlight for example, an everyday object, e.g. a tambourine, or something which would be totally inexplicable in the real world, such as a puddle of blue "galoo". Whatever is found becomes the catalyst for the episode's adventures and the trigger for the Fimbles' creative play. The other characters featured are large-scale puppets who normally help out the Fimbles with something.

The snouted and concentrically-ringed appearance of the Fimbles was based on the eponymous antagonists of Lucy Anna and the Finders, written and illustrated by Sarah Hayes. Although Hayes is cited in the credits of Fimbles, and she was involved in adapting the characters for the television series, the implacably omnivorous Finders (who, throughout the book, threaten to eat Lucy Anna) have nothing else in common with the Fimbles.

== Characters ==
- Fimbo – A yellow Fimble with green stripes. Fimbo is the oldest, tallest and only male of the trio. He likes to play his Shimmi Shaker and eat crumble crackers. He is operated by John Tobias, Steve Poole and Adam Blaug and voiced by Aidan Cook.
- Florrie – A blue Fimble with purple stripes. She likes to sing songs and is normally seen with a doll that resembles a Fimble called "Little One". She is operated by Jenny Hutchinson, Leah Green and Holli Hoffman and voiced by Shelley Longworth (Season 1) and Kate Harbour (Season 2).
- Baby Pom – A green Fimble with pink stripes. Being the youngest and smallest, she has a personality similar to that of a toddler. She generally follows the other Fimbles around their world and normally pushes a yellow wagon called the "Trundle Truck". She is operated by Samantha Dodd and Denise Dove and voiced by Tamsin Heatley.
- Bessie – A plump pink bird who lives near the waterfall with Ribble. She normally gives out a summary at the end of the program of what the Fimbles did in the episode and she shows the Fimbles what the found items are. The episode, "Yodelling Echo", reveals she knows how to yodel. She is puppeteered by Neil Sterenberg, Steven Kynman and Robert Skidmore (assistant) and voiced by Tamsin Heatley.
- Roly Mo – A purple and green striped mole. He has a huge underground library, where he finds a book to show off to the Fimbles in every episode. He is puppeteered by Neil Sterenberg and Iestyn Evans (assistant) and voiced by Wayne Forester.
- Rockit – A blue tree frog who is normally seen hopping around and being quite inquisitive and energetic. He is puppeteered by Simon Buckley and Katherine Smee and voiced by Wayne Forester.
- Ribble – An orange male fluffball chick with a light blue beak who is Bessie's son. He makes squeaks that the other characters can understand. He was given black eyes in later episodes. He is operated by Garry Rutter, Dan Carlisle and Matthew Lyons and voiced by Tamsin Heatley.

== Episodes ==
There are 200 episodes altogether.

=== Series 1 (2002-03) ===
1. Suitcase (23 September 2002)
2. Wig
3. Red (25 September 2002)
4. Tambourine
5. Jingly Hat
6. Tissues
7. Spots
8. Blue (17 October 2002)
9. Wellington
10. Hoop
11. Woolly Hat
12. Puzzle
13. Red Nose
14. Ball
15. Shiny Button
16. Tent
17. Watering Can
18. Pebbles
19. Hooter
20. Cotton Wool
21. Party Hat
22. Wind
23. Mirror
24. Sock
25. Wooden Spoon
26. Shopping Basket
27. Cushion
28. Sticky Patch
29. Windmill
30. Clockwork Toy
31. Gnome
32. Balloon
33. String
34. Russian Dolls
35. Sunbeam
36. Picture Frame
37. Reflection
38. Funnel
39. Pedal Bin
40. Moon (1 November 2002)
41. Squeaky Toy
42. Shoes
43. Magic Wand
44. Postcard (18 November 2002)
45. Stepping Stones (22 November 2002)
46. Money Box
47. Raincloud
48. Envelope
49. Cards
50. Invitation
51. Circle
52. Furry Material
53. Rainbow
54. Lunch Bag
55. Box of Coins
56. Treasure Chest
57. Arrow
58. Hairbrush
59. Radio
60. Yellow
61. Music Box
62. Keys
63. Cuddle
64. Bubbles
65. Tune
66. Star
67. Glitter
68. Snowflake
69. Wrapping Paper
70. Sleeping Bag
71. Feather
72. Tube
73. Picture Book
74. Building Blocks (16 December 2002)
75. Hiccup
76. Triangle
77. Baby's Shoes
78. Traffic Light
79. Spinning Top
80. Leaf
81. Whisper
82. Toy Phone
83. Tin Tray
84. Signpost
85. Yawn
86. Feather Boa
87. Scarf (20 February 2003)
88. Big Box (21 February 2003)
89. Box of Straws (27 February 2003)
90. Baby's Rattle
91. Bird Song (3 March 2003)
92. Door
93. Handbag
94. Apron
95. Jack in the Box (11 March 2003)
96. Coconut (12 March 2003)
97. Bucket and Spade (13 March 2003)
98. Broom
99. Sand Timer
100. China Plate

=== Series 2 (2003–04) ===
1. Trumpet
2. Flag (17 March 2003)
3. Glove
4. Smell
5. Purse
6. White Line
7. Silver Foil
8. Coloured Block
9. Stripy Towel
10. Brown Paper Bag
11. Quiet Place (8 April 2003)
12. Bracelet
13. Echo
14. Bell Pull (11 April 2003)
15. Maraca
16. Alarm Clock
17. Round Mat
18. Feather Duster (18 April 2003)
19. Trousers
20. Snowman
21. Kiss
22. Chime Bars
23. Tickle
24. Egg Cup
25. Pick Up Stick
26. Horse Shoe
27. Cactus
28. Drum
29. Curtains
30. Rose
31. Scrap Book
32. Rugby Ball
33. Smelly Sock
34. Comb
35. Cloth Bib
36. Fan
37. Ticket
38. Plaster
39. Musical Baton
40. Small Box
41. Bagpipes
42. White Football
43. Hoppy Ball
44. Flowery Hat
45. Chequered Flag
46. Pop-Up Frog
47. Tennis Ball
48. Wheelbarrow
49. Skipping Rope
50. Snow Globe
51. Red Tree
52. Handbell
53. Yellow Flag
54. Three Bowls
55. Bean Bag
56. Pot of Glitter
57. Pom's Triangle
58. Acorn
59. Pillow
60. Top Hat
61. Chalk and Board
62. Kite
63. Cowboy Hat
64. Birthday Present
65. Teddy Bear
66. Blue Cloth
67. Hole
68. Toy Box
69. Gold Star
70. Shadow
71. Dog Basket
72. Umbrella
73. Clockwork Mouse
74. Yodelling Echo
75. Seashell
76. Shoelaces
77. Cardboard Box
78. Jelly
79. Tinsel
80. Gold Coin
81. Stethoscope
82. Rollerskate
83. Wobbly Board
84. Pumpkin
85. Modelling Balloon
86. Raindrop
87. Widget
88. Castanets
89. Bead Counter
90. Whistle
91. Kazoo
92. Joke Teeth
93. Cold Place
94. Pop-Up Book
95. Chef's Hat
96. Nodding Dog
97. Queen's Crown
98. Zills
99. Wishing Stone
100. Squiggle

== Related material and spin-offs ==
In 2004, The Roly Mo Show began airing on CBeebies. As with the original show, this series was also produced by Novel Entertainment and stars Roly Mo and a cast of other characters including Roly's niece Little Bo. The Roly Mo Show concentrates on literacy and books and is made as an educational programme.

Fimbly Songtime, a shortened version of the programme featuring only the songs, has also aired in the past. The programme has also erroneously been listed as Fimbles Songtime.

A radio series titled Rockit's Pocket, featuring the Rockit character, aired on the long-gone CBeebies Radio strand on BBC Radio 7 (now BBC Radio 4 Extra) in 2009.

Horrid Henry, another Novel Entertainment program, has referenced the show and characters frequently throughout the series.

A live touring show produced by BBC Worldwide titled Fimbles Live! - It's A Party toured theatres across the United Kingdom from April–November 2006 and was devised by the playwright and author David Wood CBE. The show focused on the characters planning a party, with CBeebies presenter Sarah-Jane Honeywell as the special guest, being the first human to visit Fimble Valley.

== Merchandise ==
BBC Worldwide signed a master toy deal with Mattel's Fisher-Price subsidiary for the series in May 2002.

== International airings ==
Until the early 2010s, the series' distribution and marketing was handled by BBC Worldwide. After the deal expired, distribution reverted to Novel Entertainment.

In the Republic of Ireland, Fimbles was broadcast on Network 2 (later changed to RTÉ2 in 2004) as part of a line-up of programmes for younger children called The Den and started airing on 20 January 2003.

In Australia from 3 February 2003 to 30 September 2008, Fimbles was broadcast on ABC and its third digital channel ABC2.

Fimbles (핌블핌블) has been extremely popular in South Korea, where KBS 2TV broadcast the programme under a partnership with the BBC from 23 June 2003 to 29 October 2004. Yoo Sang-won directed the Korean dub, which led the show to become well-known and liked among Koreans at the time because of its both fun and educational aspects.

In Spain Fimbles was broadcast on La 2 from March 2004 until Late 2000s during Los Lunnis, Starting from 2005, it was also shown on Playhouse Disney.

As of 1 June 2007 Fimbles (粉宝乐园) is being broadcast in China on Shanghai Media Group's children's network HAHA TV. All 200 episodes are being shown sequentially and dubbed in Mandarin Chinese. As the show in its original format is only 19 minutes long, the show has been lengthened by 5 minutes for the Chinese market.

In Vietnam, since 2008, Fimbles is a part of the show 5 Minutes to Learn English Everyday (5 phút học [tiếng Anh] mỗi ngày), which is produced by HTV4 together with many famous English centres and international schools. However, in VBC, it is a separate show named Những chú heo con Fimbles.

Since June 2008, the show has also been broadcast by Tata Sky DTH in India under a partnership with the BBC on the country's variant of the CBeebies channel.

In Colombia from 2004 and 2007, it was broadcast by Señal Colombia.

In New Zealand, the show was played on TV2.

In South Africa, Fimbles began airing on SABC 1.

In Singapore, it was broadcast by Central and played on their children's block Kids Central. The series aired in Singapore from 2003 to January 2006 and then on Okto in 2011.

In Hong Kong, the series was screened on TVB Pearl.

In Malta, Fimbles was aired on TVM.

In Thailand, the English version of the series was broadcast on Thai cable television TrueVisions (originally known as UBC at the time) on their children's network UBC Spark.

The show has aired on Bang Bang in Albania under the title Fimbëllsat, with re-runs continuing to air as recently as 2012. It is dubbed in Albanian.

In Israel, Fimbles has been broadcast in Hebrew on the Hop! Channel. One of the voice artists of that dub is Ami Mandelman, who also voiced Bert on Rechov Sumsum, and Goofy from The Mickey Mouse Series.

== Awards ==
=== Award nominations ===
- BAFTA Children's Awards 2003
  - Nominated for Best Pre-school Live Action Series
- BAFTA Children's Awards 2004
  - Nominated for Best Pre-school Live Action Series
