= Theo Stevenson =

English actor (born 1998)

- Born: Theodore John Stevenson; 27 February 1998 (age 28); Harlow, Essex, England
- Education: St John's School
- Occupations: Actor, musician
- Years active: 2007–present
- Known for: Horrid Henry: The Movie; All Stars; Millie Inbetween

Theodore John Stevenson (born 27 February 1998) is an English actor and musician.. He is best known for portraying the lead role of Horrid Henry in Horrid Henry: The Movie (2011) and Ethan in All Stars (2013). He went on to appear as Craig in the sitcom Millie Inbetween (2014–2018) and its spin-off Flatmates (2019–2021), as well as playing Toby in the sci-fi drama Humans (2015–2018).

== Life and career ==
In 2007, Stevenson became an actor and took his first film role in Fred Claus as Young Nicolaus. He then appeared in the black comedy In Bruges in 2008. In 2010, he starred in Reuniting the Rubins where he played the role of Jake Rubins. In 2011, he took on his best-known role as Horrid Henry in Horrid Henry: The Movie where he worked alongside Tyger Drew-Honey and Anjelica Huston. He also appeared in the film's music video and appeared on Daybreak in late 2011.

A year after Horrid Henry: The Movie, Vertigo Films announced that Stevenson would star in an upcoming secondary school version of Streetdance called Streetdance Juniors which was renamed All Stars in June 2012, releasing on 3 May 2013. He stars alongside Akai Osei, Ashley Jensen, Kimberley Walsh and John Barrowman amongst others.

From 2014 to 2018, Stevenson had a main role in Millie Inbetween, a CBBC comedy-drama, playing the role of the main character Millie's stepbrother. He later reprised the role for the spin-off Flatmates.

Between 2015 and 2018, Stevenson had a main role as Toby Hawkins in the drama Humans.

== Filmography ==
Year	Title	Role	Notes
2007	Fred Claus	Young Nick	Film
2008	In Bruges	Boy in Church	Film
2010	Reuniting the Rubins	Jake Rubin	Film
2011	Horrid Henry: The Movie	Horrid Henry	Film
2012	Little Cracker	Boy	1 episode
2013	All Stars	Ethan	Film
2014–2018	Millie Inbetween	Craig	Main role (seasons 1–3); Recurring role (season 4)
2015–2018	Humans	Toby	Main role
2017	Butterfly Kisses	Jake	Film
2019–2021	Flatmates	Craig	Main role
2021	A Woman At Night	Nick the Banker	Short film
2021	And Then The Tide Came In	Dylan	Short film
