= Helena Barlow =

English actress (born 1998)

- Born: Helena Josephine Barlow; 5 September 1998 (age 28); Lambeth, London, England
- Education: University of Leeds; Royal Central School of Speech and Drama
- Occupation: Actress
- Years active: 2009–present

Helena Josephine Barlow (born 5 September 1998) is an English actress. She began her career as a child actress, playing Rose Granger-Weasley in Harry Potter and the Deathly Hallows – Part 2 (2011). The following year, she starred as young Estella in Mike Newell's Great Expectations.

== Early life ==
Barlow was born in Lambeth and has two sisters and a brother. She attended Alleyn's School. She went on to graduate with a Bachelor of Arts in English Literature from the University of Leeds in 2020 and a Master of Arts in Acting for Screen from the Royal Central School of Speech and Drama in 2021. She also took a summer course at RADA.

== Career ==
Barlow began her career on the small British stage in 2009, where she appeared in a bit part in The Nutcracker for the English Youth Ballet and later participated in the opening number for the Michael Croft Theatre, a host to a variety of school productions, including the Alleyn's Junior School, which Barlow attended in 2010. Her first leading role was Wendy Darling for the Alleyn's Junior School Year Six production of Peter Pan, adapted by Maggi Law. Like many of the school's productions, it too was performed in the Michael Croft Theatre.

Her most notable role came in 2011 when it was announced in June that she had been cast as Rose Granger-Weasley—oldest child of Hermione Granger and Ron Weasley in the commercially successful Harry Potter and the Deathly Hallows – Part 2. At the age of 12, this was her first professional film credit.

She went on to appear the same year in Horrid Henry: The Movie, an adaptation of Francesca Simon's children's book series of the same name and in 2012, in Mike Newell's adaptation of Charles Dickens' Great Expectations as the younger version of Estella Havisham played by Holliday Grainger as an adult, respectively. She appeared alongside Harry Potter alums Helena Bonham Carter, Ralph Fiennes, Robbie Coltrane and Jessie Cave.

In 2013, her project is Harriet and the Matches in the titular role, a five-minute short film directed by Miranda Howard-Williams and written by Heinrich Hoffmann. According to the official site synopsis, the film is an adaptation of "a traditional German fairy tale" and "is a dark cautionary tale about a lonely little girl."

Her latest project is ITILY: I Think I Love You a thirteen-minutes short film directed and written by Agnes Fernandes. The film is a summer romance between an English bus driver and a young architect brightens up the morning commute of his hilarious passengers and leads to the driver taking his double decker all the way to Rome to prove himself deserving of her love.

== Filmography ==
=== Film ===
Year	Title	Role	Notes
2011	Harry Potter and the Deathly Hallows – Part 2	Rose Granger-Weasley	
2011	Horrid Henry: The Movie	Sour Susan	
2012	Great Expectations	Young Estella Havisham	
2013	Harriet and the Matches	Harriet	Short film
2019	ITILY: I Think I Love You	Mia	Short film

=== Television ===
Year	Title	Role	Notes
2023	Father Brown	Penny Briggs	Episode: "The Show Must Go On"
2023	Rosamunde Pilcher	Keira Merchant	Episode: "Schlagzeile Liebe"
2025	Professor T	Ophelia McQueen	Episode: "Overboard"
TBA	Danny Boy †	Marie	Television film; completed

=== Theatre ===
Year	Title	Role	Notes
2009	The Nutcracker	Ensemble dancer	English Youth Ballet
2009	Opening of Michael Croft Theatre	Schoolgirl	Dir. Edward Alleyn; Michael Croft Theatre/Alleyn's Junior School
2010	Peter Pan	Wendy Darling	Alleyn's Junior School
