= Butterfly Kisses (2017 film) =

- Directed by: Rafael Kapelinski
- Written by: Greer Ellison
- Produced by: Merlin Merton; Jaceq Szumlas
- Starring: Theo Stevenson; Thomas Turgoose; Rosie Day
- Cinematography: Nick Cooke
- Edited by: Andrew Walton
- Music by: Nathan W Klein
- Production companies: Blue Shadows Films; Solopan
- Distributed by: M-Appeal
- Release date: 2017
- Running time: 89 minutes
- Countries: United Kingdom; Poland
- Language: English

Butterfly Kisses is a 2017 British-Polish drama directed by Rafael Kapelinski and written by Greer Ellison. It stars Theo Stevenson, Thomas Turgoose and Rosie Day.

== Plot ==
We follow Jake and his two best friends through a world distorted by sex and porn. They all have their own demons, but Jake's secret is one that he can't tell anyone.

== Cast ==
- Theo Stevenson as Jake
- Thomas Turgoose as Shrek
- Elliot Cowan as Billy
- Rosie Day as Zara
- Charlotte Beaumont as Amy
- Honor Kneafsey as Lilly

== Reception ==
The film has received favorable reviews.
