= Lizzie Waterworth =

British voice actress

Elizabeth Waterworth-Santo is a British voice actress, best known for voicing the titular character of CITV's Horrid Henry, for which she was nominated for the British Academy Children's Awards Best Performer in 2019. She has also voiced other characters in animations, including Dougpo in Tinpo, Bello in Jelly Jamm, Uniqua and Austin in The Backyardigans, several characters from Alphablocks, Franklin in the UK dub of Franklin, Mungo in Strike, Marcus in Marcus Level, Seymour in Seymour Science and Cutie in It Takes Two.

In 2023, Waterworth published How to Talk so People Will Listen, a guide on confident speaking. Aimed at an audience age 9 and older, the book provides tips on breathing and voice control and preparing to speak to audiences, utilising cartoon illustrations to depict storing these tips in an imaginary confidence toolbox.
