= Tamsin Heatley =

British actress

- Occupation: Actress

Tamsin Heatley is a British actress. She has appeared on television programmes such as The Bill, The Young Ones, Horrid Henry, Fimbles, Tweenies, Big & Small and various other children's television shows. Her father was Norman Heatley, a biochemist who helped pioneer early penicillin research.

== Films and TV ==
- 1999 - Tweenies
- 2002 - Fimbles
- 2004 - The Roly Mo Show
- 2006 - Horrid Henry
- 2011 - Big and Small
