= Polyplocology =

Polyplocology from the Ancient Greek ‘polys’ (multiple), ‘plokè’ (entangled and plot) and ‘logos’ (account of) is an expression introduced by Lambros Couloubaritsis in his 2014 work “La philosophie face à la question de la complexité : le défi majeur du 21^{e} siècle.” (philosophy confronted with the complexity question: the biggest challenge for the 21st century). It addresses reality conceived as a multitude of entangled stories and has the same etymological origin as ‘complexity’ and ‘complicated’.

Complexity and complicated can be retraced to the Latin terms ‘com’ (together) and ‘plex’ (from ‘plicāre’ or to fold) which finds its origin in the Ancient Greek ‘ploké’. Couloubaritsis, following others such as Edgar Morin and Olivier Hamant, emphasizes that something complex and something complicated are altogether different. Something complicated, such as a watch, which generally is linear, is characterized by local (inter)relations which do not lead to the emergence of something new. Something complex is also characterized by (inter)actions or entities in close collaboration, which through their interactions give rise to the emergence of something new.

The polyplocology or complexology endeavours to understand reality in its complexity because it implies a multitude of interactions. These interactions actualize dynamic relations and feed backs, antagonisms and associations, interactive entanglements and interwovenness between all things (live beings and their activities as well as the non-living) and their environments, which are actualised through their configurating activity.

Couloubaritsis endeavours to surpass different approaches of henology of the One and the Multitude, which often are detached from everyday experiences, by reverting to models and abstraction, but nevertheless demonstrate a metaphysical structure. According to Couloubaritsis nor ontology, nor the study of complexity can grasp complexity.

The polyplocology, following Couloubaritsis, is the method to understand complexity because it combines henology, agathology and ontology to understand complexity. Carlo Rovelli known for his interpretation of quantum mechanics as relational in Helgoland describes the universe as a "[...] web of entanglement".

In her doctoral thesis "Being in Becoming. A philosophical Study of Entanglement or the Rationale of the Polyplocology" Photis Schurmans proposes a new worldview starting from Lambros Couloubaritsis's polyplocology and integrating Rovelli's web of entanglement. She argues that reality is a fundamental interweaving, in which all phenomenons are entangled with each other in permanent complexity. Systems according to her are not static, but are continuously formed by their interactions. Reality is not a set of fixed 'things' but a permanent process of becoming through the profound entanglement. The polyplocology is a methodology to grasp the transition from chaos to meaningful structures. Reality is both a unity and a multitude whereby a new henological, ontological and agathological approach is proposed.
