= List of students of Plotinus =

Students of 3rd century Neoplatonist Plotinus

The following is a list of students of Plotinus. The philosopher Plotinus was the founder of a tradition later known as Neoplatonism.

== Porphyry ==
Porphyry, the most important of Plotinus's pupils, was born in Tyre c. 233. He was taught first by Cassius Longinus in Athens, before travelling to Rome in 262 where he studied under Plotinus for six years. After the death of Plotinus, he edited and published the Enneads, which had been compiled by his teacher. He also wrote a biography of his teacher, and many commentaries and philosophical works, some of which survive and is famous for his attacks on Christianity compiled in his Adversus Christianos, of which only fragments preserved by his Christian opponents remain.

== Amelius ==
Amelius was originally a student of the works of Numenius of Apamea, before attending the lectures of Plotinus in the third year after Plotinus came to Rome, and never left him until the end of his life. Amelius read and wrote voraciously, writing over 100 volumes of sayings and commentaries, none of which survive. His most important convert to Neoplatonism was Porphyry.

== Castricius Firmus ==
Castricius Firmus was a 3rd-century neoplatonist and disciple of Plotinus. Plotinus was on the most familiar terms with him (Zethos), and used to stay with him at his country place, six miles from Minturnae, a property which had formerly belonged to Castricius Firmus.

Porphyry stated of Castricius Firmus in the Life of Plotinus, "Castricius was excelled by none of the group in appreciation of the finer side of life: he venerated Plotinus; he devoted himself in the most faithful comradeship to Amelius in every need, and was in all matters as loyal to myself as though I were his own brother."

== Eustochius of Alexandria ==
Eustochius of Alexandria was a 3rd-century neoplatonic philosopher and student of Plotinus. Porphyry stated in the Life of Plotinus, "Among closer personal friends was Eustochius of Alexandria, also a doctor, who came to know Plotinus towards the end of his life, and attended him until his death: Eutochius consecrated himself exclusively to Plotinus' system and became a veritable philosopher."

== Marcellus Orontius and Sabinillus ==
Senators Marcellus Orontius and Sabinillus were 3rd century neoplatonists and disciples of Plotinus. Porphyry stated of them in the Life of Plotinus, "There were also among Plotinus' hearers not a few members of the Senate, amongst whom Marcellus Orontius and Sabinillus showed the greatest assiduity in philosophical studies."

== Paulinus ==
Paulinus was a 3rd-century neoplatonist and disciple of Plotinus. Porphyry stated of Paulinus in the Life of Plotinus, "The group included also one Paulinus, a doctor of Scythopolis, whom Amelius used to call Mikkalos in allusion to his blundering habit of mind."

== Rogatianus ==
Rogatianus was a 3rd-century neoplatonist and disciple of Plotinus. Porphyry stated of Rogatianus in the Life of Plotinus. "Another Senator, Rogatianus, advanced to such detachment from political ambitions that he gave up all his property, dismissed all his slaves, renounced every dignity, and, on the point of taking up his praetorship, the lictors already at the door, refused to come out or to have anything to do with the office. He even abandoned his own house, spending his time here and there at this friends' and acquaintances', sleeping and eating with them and taking, at that, only one meal every other day. He had been a victim of gout, carried in a chair, but this new regime of abstinence and abnegation restored his health: he had been unable to stretch out his hands; he came to use them as freely as men living by manual labour. Plotinus took a great liking to Rogatianus and frequently praised him very highly, holding him up as a model to those aiming at the philosophical life."

== Serapion ==
Serapion was a 3rd-century neoplatonic philosopher and student of Plotinus. Porphyry wrote of Serapion in the Life of Plotinus that "Then there was Serapion, an Alexandrian, who began life as a professional orator and later took to the study of philosophy, but was never able to conquer the vices of avarice and usury."

== Zethos ==
Zethos was a 3rd-century neoplatonist and disciple of Plotinus. Porphyry stated of Zethos in the Life of Plotinus, "Another friend was Zethos, an Arabian by descent, who married a daughter of Ammonius' friend Theodosius. Zethos, too, was a doctor. Plotinus was deeply attached to him and was always trying to divert him from the political career in which he stood high. Plotinus was on the most familiar terms with him, and used to stay with him at his country place, six miles from Minturnae, a property which had formerly belonged to Castricius Firmus."

== Zoticus ==
Zoticus was a 3rd-century neoplatonic philosopher and student of Plotinus. Porphyry stated in the Life of Plotinus that Zoticus was a critic and poet who also amended the text of Antimachus. Zoticus also authored a poem upon the Atlantis story. His sight failed, and he died a little before Plotinus, as also did Paulinus.
