= Ammonius of Alexandria (disambiguation) =

Ammonius (Ancient Greek: Ἀμμώνιος) of Alexandria was the name of several people from ancient history:

- Ammonius of Alexandria, ancient Olympic athlete who won the stadion race in the 131st Olympiad in 256 BCE
- Ammonius of Alexandria, ancient grammarian
- Ammonius of Alexandria (Christian philosopher), philosopher of the 3rd century CE
- Ammonius (Alexandrian monk), 5th century CE Christian monk

== See also ==
- Ammonius Saccas
