= John N. Deck =

Canadian philosopher (1921–1979)

John Norbert Deck (born Buffalo, New York, December 2, 1921; died September 5, 1979) was a Canadian philosopher. Adhering to neither sartorial nor intellectual fashions, Deck inspired generations of students with his highly idiosyncratic form of idealism, deriving from Plotinus but equally rooted in Thomas Aquinas and Hegel.

== Education and career ==
He was educated at Assumption College in Windsor, Ontario, which at that time was affiliated with the University of Western Ontario (B.A., 1946, M.A., 1946). He received his Ph.D. in philosophy at the University of Toronto in 1960. His doctoral dissertation reappraised the Neoplatonic philosophy of Plotinus from the standpoint of a central doctrine in his Enneads, exploring how "contemplative producing" gives rise to every level of reality, including the physical world; it was published as Nature, Contemplation, and the One: A Study in the Philosophy of Plotinus by the University of Toronto Press in 1967.

After serving as Assistant Professor of Philosophy at Boston College and a brief stint working for the Canadian Pacific Railway, in 1957 he became Professor of Philosophy at Assumption College, (later known as the University of Windsor), where he taught graduate and undergraduate courses in metaphysics and the history of philosophy until his death. The University of Windsor awards the John N. Deck Memorial Prize in Philosophy each year "in recognition of outstanding scholastic achievement or proficiency."

At a time when Neoplatonism in philosophy, as well as philosophy itself in the university, was considered hopelessly outdated, he developed a freshman class called "Dream worlds and real worlds" that brought the message of Plotinus to the most unpromising students; it proved to be immensely popular, disconcerting his academic rivals.

Although he died in 1979, he is arguably more popular and influential now than ever before. Nature, Contemplation, and the One was republished in 1991 (back in print for the first time after over twenty years, and in a convenient paperback) and now a proliferation of websites such as Anthony Flood's are making available his articles for ongoing discussion.

== Legacy ==
R. Baine Harris, Director of the International Neoplatonic Society, has called Nature, Contemplation and the One "the best book on Plotinus" and said that "it must be read by all modern serious students of Plotinus."

Anthony Damiani, a longtime student of Paul Brunton and founder of Wisdom's Goldenrod Center for Philosophic Studies in upstate New York, considered Deck's magnum opus, Nature, Contemplation, and the One to be the best guide to Plotinus. His publishing house, Larson, has republished it in paperback with a brief introduction by Deck's friend and executor, Lawrence Dewan, which places Deck as a member of the "workshop of Plotinus." They have also reissued an edition of Stephen MacKenna's translation of the Enneads of Plotinus, which footnotes alternate translations from all the later scholars, especially Deck.

== Books and selected articles ==
=== Books ===
- Nature, Contemplation, and the One: A Study in the Philosophy of Plotinus. Toronto: University of Toronto Press, 1967. Reprinted: Burdett: Larson, 1991.

=== Selected articles ===
- Review of Jacques Maritain, Bergsonian Philosophy and Thomism, and The Social and Political Philosophy of Jacques Maritain, Philosophy and Phenomenological Research, 18:4, June 1958, 561-62.
- Review of Ethics: The Introduction to Moral Science by John A. Oesterle, Philosophy and Phenomenological Research, Vol. 19, No. 4 (Jun., 1959), p. 544
- Review of Social Philosophy by Martin G. Plattel. Philosophy and Phenomenological Research, Vol. 27, No. 1 (Sep., 1966), pp. 128–129.
- St. Thomas Aquinas and the Language of Total Dependence. Dialogue: Canadian Philosophical Review. 6, June 1967, 74-88. Reprinted in Aquinas: A Collection of Critical Essays, ed. Anthony Kenny, University of Notre Dame Press, 1977.
- The Itself: In-Another Pattern and Total Dependence. Idealistic Studies: An Interdisciplinary Journal of Philosophy, 5, January 1975, 59-69.
- Plotinus and Sartre: An Ontological Investigation of Being-Other-Than. The Significance of Neoplatonism, ed. R. Baine Harris, Studies in Neoplatonism: Vol. 1, The State University of New York Press, 1976, 319-31.
- A Discussion on Individuality and Personality. Dionysius, 2, December 1978, 93-99. [With A. H. Armstrong ]
- The Categories of Unthought. Idealistic Studies: An Interdisciplinary Journal of Philosophy, 10, May 1980, 173-179.
- The One, or God, Is Not Properly Hypostasis: A Reply to Professor Anton. The Structure of Being, Albany: State University of New York Press, 1982.
- Metaphysics or Logic? New Scholasticism, 63, Spring 1989, pp. 229–240.

== See also ==
- Plotinus
- Neoplatonism
- Thomas Aquinas
- Hegel
- University of Toronto
- University of Windsor
