= Reskadinnick =

Coordinates: 50.226°N 5.317°W

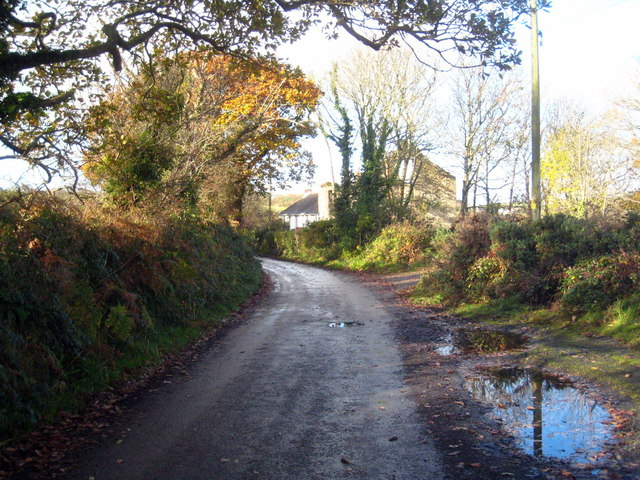
- Minor road approaching Reskadinnick from the east

- Location within Cornwall
- OS grid reference: SW635415
- Unitary authority: Cornwall
- Ceremonial county: Cornwall
- Region: South West
- Country: England
- Sovereign state: United Kingdom
- Post town: Camborne
- Postcode district: TR14
- Dialling code: 01209

Reskadinnick is a hamlet north of Camborne in west Cornwall, England, UK The postal code for Reskadinnick, Cornwall is TR14 OBL.

== Stephen MacKenna ==
Stephen MacKenna was a journalist, linguist and writer of Irish descent. He is perhaps most well known for his important English translation of the Greek-speaking philosopher Plotinus. He was resident at Reskadinnick in his latter years.

== Molly Hughes ==
Molly Hughes (Nee Thomas) 1866-1956 wrote several memoirs about growing up in London in the nineteenth century. in A London Child of the 1870s she devotes four chapters to a family visit to Reskadinnick, the home of her maternal grandfather, Joseph Vivian, and numerous Vivian relatives. This provides a detailed and vivid account of Reskadinnick in the late 1870s.
