= Origen the Pagan =

3rd century Alexandrian Platonist philosopher

Origen the Pagan (Greek: Ὠριγένης; fl. early 3rd century) was a Platonist philosopher who lived in Alexandria. He was a student of Ammonius Saccas and a contemporary of Plotinus in Ammonius's philosophy school in Alexandria. Some researchers posit that this Origen is the very same famous Christian philosopher and theologian Origen of Alexandria, who was educated by Ammonius Saccas. The pagan philosopher is sometimes referred to as Origenes to distinguish him more easily from the Christian Origen.

Origen is mentioned three times in Porphyry's Life of Plotinus, where he is treated much more kindly than the Christian Origen, whom Porphyry disliked. He is also mentioned several times by Proclus, and it is clear that Origen's fellow students Plotinus and Longinus treated him with respect. According to Porphyry, Plotinus estimated him so far as to say that he has nothing to teach him.

The only aspect of his philosophical views which are known is that he did not make the first principle of reality the One beyond intellect and being as Plotinus did, but rather the first principle was the supreme intellect and primary being, which suggests that his views were that of traditional Middle Platonism, rather than the Neoplatonism of Plotinus.
