= Agathology =

Agathology from the Ancient Greek Agathós, something good, the good, an ultimate principle, summum bonum, concerns the multiple practices of the Good or how to make the best choices, since Plato, to secure 'what all things search for'. With ontology and henology, it is part of the ultimate references of traditional metaphysics.

For Plato knowledge of the Good, or more exactly the highest type of knowledge is dialectical. Dialectics for Plato is an activity of more and more precise identification of the undetermined through the scrutiny of the claims of pleasure and wisdom. It is not enough to say that the Good is a measurement unit, beauty or truth, one needs to discover and understand the result. The one that understands the Good possesses a perfect combination of the limited and the unlimited in the mixture of pleasure and wisdom, whereby the latter determines the former. The dialectical practice sustains continuous active thought in this mixture which requires permanent reflection.

Aristotle defines 'what all things search for' as happiness, i.e. activity in accordance with virtue. Virtue is a quality amongst other qualities, such as cold and warm. The cross section between the two extremes transposed on an arch (see figure) is the Good. It is virtue which is the measure of all actions and it confers the agent with moral quality. The transcendent Good no loner is Plato's One (see henology) but the end, the final cause.

Plotinus, as does Plato, identifies the One (see henology) with the Good.

== See also ==
- Metaphysics, philosophical concept
