= Theodidaktos =

Theodidaktos (from Ancient Greek: theos, 'god', and didaktos, 'taught') were "the immediate disciples of Ammonius Saccas, who was called Theodidaktos, "God-Taught" – such as Plotinus and his follower Porphyry."
