= RQM =

RQM or rqm may refer to:

- Relational quantum mechanics, an interpretation of quantum mechanics
- Relativistic quantum mechanics, a theory in quantum mechanics
- Rekem, a former name of the archaeological city Petra
- Regimental quartermaster, a type of military quartermaster
