= Lloyd P. Gerson =

American Neoplatonism scholar (born 1948)

- Born: December 23, 1948 (age 77); Chicago, Illinois

Academic background
- Education: University of Toronto (PhD)
- Thesis: The Unity of Plato's "Parmenides" (1975)

Academic work
- Era: Contemporary philosophy
- Region: Western philosophy
- Institutions: University of Toronto

Lloyd Phillip Gerson (Dec. 23, 1948, Chicago, Illinois) is an American-Canadian professor emeritus of philosophy at the University of Toronto.

Gerson is a scholar of ancient philosophy, the history of philosophy, metaphysics, and Neoplatonism. He is a fellow of the Royal Society of Canada. He is best known for his work on Plotinus, particularly his full-length translation of the Enneads that is based primarily on the Henry-Schwyzer editio minor (HS^{2}) Greek text.

== Works ==
- God and Greek Philosophy: Studies in the early history of natural theology, London: Routledge, 1990
- Plotinus, London: Routledge, 1994, (Arguments of the Philosophers Series)
- Knowing Persons. A Study in Plato, Oxford: Oxford University Press, 2004
- Aristotle and Other Platonists, Ithaca: Cornell University Press, 2005
- Ancient Epistemology, Cambridge: Cambridge University Press, 2009
- From Plato to Platonism, Ithaca: Cornell University Press, 2013
- The Enneads, Cambridge University Press, 2018 (translated and edited with George Boys-Stones, John M. Dillon, R.A. King, Andrew Smith and James Wilberding)
- Platonism and Naturalism. The Possibility of Philosophy, Cornell University Press, 2020
- Plato's Moral Realism. Cambridge University Press, 2023.
