= Relational quantum mechanics =

Interpretation of quantum mechanics

Relational quantum mechanics (RQM) is an interpretation of quantum mechanics which treats the state of a quantum system as being relational, that is, the state is the relation between the observer and the system. This interpretation was first delineated by Carlo Rovelli in a 1994 preprint, and has since been expanded upon by a number of theorists. It is inspired by the key idea behind special relativity, that the details of an observation depend on the reference frame of the observer, and Wheeler's idea that information theory would make sense of quantum mechanics.

The physical content of the theory has not to do with objects themselves, but the relations between them. As Rovelli puts it:

"Quantum mechanics is a theory about the physical description of physical systems relative to other systems, and this is a complete description of the world".

The essential idea behind RQM is that different observers may give different accurate accounts of the same system. For example, to one observer, a system is in a single, "collapsed" eigenstate. To a second observer, the same system is in a superposition of two or more states and the first observer is in a correlated superposition of two or more states. RQM argues that this is a complete picture of the world because the notion of "state" is always relative to some observer. There is no privileged, "real" account. The state vector of conventional quantum mechanics becomes a description of the correlation of some degrees of freedom in the observer, with respect to the observed system. The terms "observer" and "observed" apply to any arbitrary system, microscopic or macroscopic. The classical limit is a consequence of aggregate systems of very highly correlated subsystems. A "measurement event" is thus described as an ordinary physical interaction where two systems become correlated to some degree with respect to each other.

Rovelli criticizes describing this as a form of "observer-dependence" which suggests reality depends upon the presence of a conscious observer, when his point is instead that reality is relational and thus the state of a system can be described even in relation to any physical object and not necessarily a human observer.

The proponents of the relational interpretation argue that this approach resolves some of the traditional interpretational difficulties with quantum mechanics. By giving up our preconception of a global privileged state, issues around the measurement problem and local realism are resolved.

== History and development ==
Relational quantum mechanics arose from a comparison of the quandaries posed by the interpretations of quantum mechanics with those resulting from Lorentz transformations prior to the development of special relativity. Rovelli suggested that just as pre-relativistic interpretations of Lorentz's equations were complicated by incorrectly assuming an observer-independent time exists, a similarly incorrect assumption frustrates attempts to make sense of the quantum formalism. The assumption rejected by relational quantum mechanics is the existence of an observer-independent state of a system.

The idea has been expanded upon by Lee Smolin and Louis Crane, who have both applied the concept to quantum cosmology, and the interpretation has been applied to the EPR paradox, revealing not only a peaceful co-existence between quantum mechanics and special relativity, but a formal indication of a completely local character to reality.

In 2020, Rovelli published an account of the main ideas of the relational interpretation in his pop-science book Helgoland.

In 2023, Rovelli published a paper with Emily Adlam that presented a significant revision to relational quantum mechanics. Adlam and Rovelli introduced a new axiom, positing the existence of "cross-perspective links", which has been seen as a major move away from relationalism.

== The problem of the observer and the observed ==
This problem was initially discussed in detail in Everett's thesis, The Theory of the Universal Wavefunction. Consider observer $O$, measuring the state of the quantum system $S$. We assume that $O$ has complete information on the system, and that $O$ can write down the wavefunction $|\psi\rangle$ describing it. At the same time, there is another observer $O'$, who is interested in the state of the entire $O$-$S$ system, and $O'$ likewise has complete information.

To analyse this system formally, we consider a system $S$ which may take one of two states, which we shall designate $|{\uparrow}\rangle$ and $|{\downarrow}\rangle$, ket vectors in the Hilbert space $H_S$. Now, the observer $O$ wishes to make a measurement on the system. At time $t_1$, this observer may characterize the system as follows:

$$| \psi \rangle = \alpha|{\uparrow}\rangle + \beta|{\downarrow}\rangle ,$$

where $|\alpha|^2$ and $|\beta|^2$ are probabilities of finding the system in the respective states, and these add up to 1. For our purposes here, we can assume that in a single experiment, the outcome is the eigenstate $|{\uparrow}\rangle$ (but this can be substituted throughout, without loss of generality, by $|{\downarrow}\rangle$). So, we may represent the sequence of events in this experiment, with observer $O$ doing the observing, as follows:

$$\begin{matrix} t_1 & \rightarrow & t_2 \\
\alpha |{\uparrow}\rangle + \beta |{\downarrow}\rangle & \rightarrow & |{\uparrow}\rangle.
\end{matrix}$$

This is the description of the measurement event given by observer $O$. Now, any measurement is also a physical interaction between two or more systems. Accordingly, we can consider the tensor product Hilbert space $H_S \otimes H_{O}$, where $H_{O}$ is the Hilbert space inhabited by state vectors describing $O$. If the initial state of $O$ is $|\text{init}\rangle$, some degrees of freedom in $O$ become correlated with the state of $S$ after the measurement, and this correlation can take one of two values: $|O_{\uparrow}\rangle$ or $|O_{\downarrow}\rangle$ where the direction of the arrows in the subscripts corresponds to the outcome of the measurement that $O$ has made on $S$.

If we now consider the description of the measurement event by the other observer, $O'$, who describes the combined $S+O$ system, but does not interact with it, the following gives the description of the measurement event according to $O'$, from the linearity inherent in the quantum formalism:

$$\begin{matrix}
t_1 & \rightarrow & t_2 \\
\left( \alpha |{\uparrow}\rangle + \beta |{\downarrow}\rangle \right)
\otimes |\text{init}\rangle
& \rightarrow
& \alpha |{\uparrow}\rangle \otimes |O_{\uparrow}\rangle
+ \beta |{\downarrow}\rangle \otimes |O_{\downarrow}\rangle.
\end{matrix}$$

Thus, on the assumption (see hypothesis 2 below) that quantum mechanics is complete, the two observers $O$ and $O'$ give different but equally correct accounts of the events $t_1 \rightarrow t_2$.

Note that the above scenario is directly linked to the Wigner's Friend thought experiment, which serves as a prime example when understanding different interpretations of quantum theory.

== Central principles ==
=== Observer-dependence of state ===
According to $O$, at $t_2$, the system $S$ is in a determinate state, namely spin up. And if quantum mechanics is complete, then so is this description. But, for $O'$, $S$ is not uniquely determinate, but is rather entangled with the state of $O$ – note that his description of the situation at $t_2$ is not factorisable no matter what basis chosen. But, if quantum mechanics is complete, then the description that $O'$ gives is also complete.

Thus the standard mathematical formulation of quantum mechanics allows different observers to give different accounts of the same sequence of events. There are many ways to overcome this perceived difficulty. It could be described as an epistemic limitation – observers with full knowledge of the system, we might say, could give a complete and equivalent description of the state of affairs, but obtaining this knowledge is impossible in practice. But which observer? What makes $O$'s description better than that of $O'$, or vice versa? Alternatively, we could claim that quantum mechanics is not a complete theory, and that by adding more structure we could arrive at a universal description (the troubled hidden variables approach). Yet another option is to give a preferred status to a particular observer or type of observer, and assign the epithet of correctness to their description alone. This has the disadvantage of being ad hoc, since there are no clearly defined or physically intuitive criteria by which this super-observer ("who can observe all possible sets of observations by all observers over the entire universe") ought to be chosen.

RQM, however, takes the point illustrated by this problem at face value. Instead of trying to modify quantum mechanics to make it fit with prior assumptions that we might have about the world, Rovelli suggest to modify our view of the world to conform to what amounts to our best physical theory of motion. Just as forsaking the notion of absolute simultaneity helped clear up the problems associated with the interpretation of the Lorentz transformations, so many of the conundrums associated with quantum mechanics dissolve, provided that the state of a system is assumed to be observer-dependent – like simultaneity in special relativity. This insight follows logically from the two main hypotheses which inform this interpretation:

- Hypothesis 1: the equivalence of systems. There is no a priori distinction that should be drawn between quantum and macroscopic systems. All systems are, fundamentally, quantum systems.
- Hypothesis 2: the completeness of quantum mechanics. There are no hidden variables or other factors which may be appropriately added to quantum mechanics, in light of current experimental evidence.

Thus, if a state is to be observer-dependent, then a description of a system would follow the form "system $S$ is in state $|{\uparrow}\rangle$ with reference to observer $O$" or similar constructions, much like in relativity theory. In RQM it is meaningless to refer to the absolute, observer-independent state of any system.

=== Information and correlation ===
It is generally well established that any quantum mechanical measurement can be reduced to a set of yes–no questions or bits that are either 1 or 0. RQM makes use of this fact to formulate the state of a quantum system (relative to a given observer!) in terms of the physical notion of information developed by Claude Shannon. Any yes/no question can be described as a single bit of information. This should not be confused with the idea of a qubit from quantum information theory, because a qubit can be in a superposition of values, whilst the "questions" of RQM are ordinary binary variables.

Any quantum measurement is fundamentally a physical interaction between the system being measured and some form of measuring apparatus. By extension, any physical interaction may be seen to be a form of quantum measurement, as all systems are seen as quantum systems in RQM. A physical interaction is seen by other observers unaware of the result, as establishing a correlation between the system and the observer, and this correlation is what is described and predicted by the quantum formalism.

But, Rovelli points out, this form of correlation is precisely the same as the definition of information in Shannon's theory. Specifically, an observer O observing a system S will, after measurement, have some degrees of freedom correlated with those of S, as described by another observer unaware of the result. The amount of this correlation is given by log_{2}k bits, where k is the number of possible values which this correlation may take – the number of "options" there are, as described by the other observer.

Note that if the other observer is aware of the measurement result, there is only one possible value for the correlation, so they will not regard the (first observer's) measurement as producing any information, as expected.

=== All systems are quantum systems ===
All physical interactions are, at the bottom level, quantum interactions, and must ultimately be governed by the same rules. Thus, an interaction between two particles does not, in RQM, differ fundamentally from an interaction between a particle and some "apparatus". There is no true wavefunction collapse, in the sense in which it occurs in some interpretations of quantum mechanics.

Because "state" is expressed in RQM as the correlation between two systems, there can be no meaning to "self-measurement". If observer $O$ measures system $S$, the state of $S$ is represented as a correlation between $O$ and $S$. $O$ itself cannot say anything with respect to its own state, as it is defined only relative to another observer ($O'$). If the $S+O$ compound system does not interact with any other systems, then it will possess a clearly defined state relative to $O'$. However, because $O$'s measurement of $S$ breaks its unitary evolution with respect to $O$, $O$ will not be able to give a full description of the $S+O$ system (since it can only speak of the correlation between $S$ and itself, not its own behaviour). A complete description of the $(S+O)+O'$ system can only be given by a further external observer, and so forth.

Taking the model system discussed above, if $O'$ has full information on the $S+O$ system, it will know the Hamiltonians of both $S$ and $O$, including the interaction Hamiltonian. Thus, the system will evolve entirely unitarily (without any form of wavefunction collapse) relative to $O'$, if $O$ measures $S$. The only reason that $O$ will perceive a "collapse" is because $O$ has incomplete information on the system (specifically, $O$ is unable to know its own Hamiltonian, and the interaction Hamiltonian for the measurement).

== Consequences and implications ==
=== Coherence ===
In our system above, $O'$ may be interested in ascertaining whether or not the state of $O$ accurately reflects the state of $S$. We can draw up for $O'$ an operator, $M$, which is specified as:

$$M\left(|{\uparrow}\rangle \otimes |O_{\uparrow}\rangle \right) = |{\uparrow}\rangle \otimes |O_{\uparrow}\rangle$$
$$M\left(|{\uparrow}\rangle \otimes |O_{\downarrow}\rangle \right) = 0$$
$$M\left(|{\downarrow}\rangle \otimes |O_{\uparrow}\rangle \right) = 0$$
$$M\left(|{\downarrow}\rangle \otimes |O_{\downarrow}\rangle \right) = |{\downarrow}\rangle \otimes |O_{\downarrow}\rangle$$

with an eigenvalue of 1 meaning that $O$ indeed accurately reflects the state of $S$. So there is a 0 probability of $O$ reflecting the state of $S$ as being $|{\uparrow}\rangle$ if it is in fact $|{\downarrow}\rangle$, and so forth. The implication of this is that at time $t_2$, $O'$ can predict with certainty that the $S+O$ system is in some eigenstate of $M$, but cannot say which eigenstate it is in, unless $O'$ itself interacts with the $S+O$ system.

An apparent paradox arises when one considers the comparison, between two observers, of the specific outcome of a measurement. In the "problem of the observer observed" section above, let us imagine that the two experiments' results are compared. If the observer $O'$ has the full Hamiltonians of both $S$ and $O$, he will be able to say with certainty that at time $t_2$, $O$ has a determinate result for $S$'s spin, but he will not be able to say what $O$'s result is without interaction, and hence breaking the unitary evolution of the compound system (because he doesn't know his own Hamiltonian). The distinction between knowing "that" and knowing "what" is a common one in everyday life: everyone knows that the weather will be like something tomorrow, but no-one knows exactly what the weather will be like.

But, let us imagine that $O'$ measures the spin of $S$, and finds it to have spin down (note that nothing in the analysis above precludes this from happening). What happens if he compares his result with $O$'s experiment? $O$ remembers he measured a spin up on the particle, and this would appear to be paradoxical: the two observers realise that they have disparate results.

However, this apparent paradox only arises as a result of the question being framed incorrectly: as long as we presuppose an "absolute" or "true" state of the world, this would, indeed, present an insurmountable obstacle for the relational interpretation. However, in a fully relational context, there is no way in which the problem can be coherently expressed. The consistency inherent in the quantum formalism, exemplified by the "M-operator" defined above, guarantees that there will be no contradictions between records. The interaction between $O'$ and whatever he chooses to measure, be it the $S+O$ compound system or $O$ and $S$ individually, will be some physical interaction (a quantum interaction), and so a complete description of it can only be given by a further observer $O''$, who will have a similar "M-operator" guaranteeing coherency (from his point of view), and so on. In other words, a situation such as that described above cannot violate any physical observation, as long as the physical content of quantum mechanics is taken to fully relational.

=== Relational networks ===
An interesting implication of RQM arises when we consider that interactions between material systems can only occur within the constraints prescribed by special relativity, namely within the intersections of the light cones of the systems: when they are spatiotemporally contiguous, in other words. Relativity tells us that objects have location only relative to other objects. By extension, a network of relations could be built up based on the properties of a set of systems, which determines which systems have properties relative to which others, and when (since properties are no longer well defined relative to a specific observer after unitary evolution breaks down for that observer). On the assumption that all interactions are local (which is supported by the analysis of the EPR paradox presented below), one could say that the ideas of "state" and spatiotemporal contiguity are two sides of the same coin: spacetime location determines the possibility of interaction, but interactions determine spatiotemporal structure. The full extent of this relationship, however, has not yet fully been explored.

=== RQM and quantum cosmology ===
The universe is the sum total of everything in existence with any possibility of direct or indirect interaction with a local observer. A (physical) observer outside of the universe would require physically breaking of gauge invariance, and a concomitant alteration in the mathematical structure of gauge-invariance theory.

Similarly, RQM conceptually forbids the possibility of an external observer. Since the assignment of a quantum state requires at least two "objects" (system and observer), which must both be physical systems, there is no meaning in speaking of the "state" of the entire universe. This is because this state would have to be ascribed to a correlation between the universe and some other physical observer, but this observer in turn would have to form part of the universe. As was discussed above, it is not possible for an object to contain a complete specification of itself. Following the idea of relational networks above, an RQM-oriented cosmology would have to account for the universe as a set of partial systems providing descriptions of one another. Such a construction was developed in particular by Francesca Vidotto.

== Relationship with other interpretations ==
The only group of interpretations of quantum mechanics with which RQM is almost completely incompatible is that of hidden variables theories. RQM shares some deep similarities with other views, but differs from them all to the extent to which the other interpretations do not accord with the "relational world" put forward by RQM.

=== Copenhagen interpretation ===
RQM is, in essence, quite similar to the Copenhagen interpretation, but with an important difference. In the Copenhagen interpretation, the macroscopic world is assumed to be intrinsically classical in nature, and wave function collapse occurs when a quantum system interacts with macroscopic apparatus. In RQM, any interaction, be it micro or macroscopic, causes the linearity of Schrödinger evolution to break down. RQM could recover a Copenhagen-like view of the world by assigning a privileged status (not dissimilar to a preferred frame in relativity) to the classical world. However, by doing this one would lose sight of the key features that RQM brings to our view of the quantum world.

=== Hidden-variables theories ===
Bohm's interpretation of QM does not sit well with RQM. One of the explicit hypotheses in the construction of RQM is that quantum mechanics is a complete theory, that is it provides a full account of the world. Moreover, the Bohmian view seems to imply an underlying, "absolute" set of states of all systems, which is also ruled out as a consequence of RQM.

We find a similar incompatibility between RQM and suggestions such as that of Penrose, which postulate that some process (in Penrose's case, gravitational effects) violate the linear evolution of the Schrödinger equation for the system.

=== Relative-state formulation ===
The many-worlds family of interpretations (MWI) shares an important feature with RQM, that is, the relational nature of all value assignments (that is, properties). Everett, however, maintains that the universal wavefunction gives a complete description of the entire universe, while Rovelli argues that this is problematic, both because this description is not tied to a specific observer (and hence is "meaningless" in RQM), and because RQM maintains that there is no single, absolute description of the universe as a whole, but rather a net of interrelated partial descriptions.

=== Consistent histories approach ===
In the consistent histories approach to QM, instead of assigning probabilities to single values for a given system, the emphasis is given to sequences of values, in such a way as to exclude (as physically impossible) all value assignments which result in inconsistent probabilities being attributed to observed states of the system. This is done by means of ascribing values to "frameworks", and all values are hence framework-dependent.

RQM accords perfectly well with this view. However, the consistent histories approach does not give a full description of the physical meaning of framework-dependent value (that is it does not account for how there can be "facts" if the value of any property depends on the framework chosen). By incorporating the relational view into this approach, the problem is solved: RQM provides the means by which the observer-independent, framework-dependent probabilities of various histories are reconciled with observer-dependent descriptions of the world.

== EPR and quantum non-locality ==
The EPR thought experiment, performed with electrons. A radioactive source (center) sends electrons in a singlet state toward two spacelike separated observers, Alice (left) and Bob (right), who can perform spin measurements. If Alice measures spin up on her electron, Bob will measure spin down on his, and vice versa.

RQM provides an unusual solution to the EPR paradox. Indeed, it manages to dissolve the problem altogether, inasmuch as there is no superluminal transportation of information involved in a Bell test experiment: the principle of locality is preserved inviolate for all observers.

=== The problem ===
In the EPR thought experiment, a radioactive source produces two electrons in a singlet state, meaning that the sum of the spin on the two electrons is zero. These electrons are fired off at time $t_1$ towards two spacelike separated observers, Alice and Bob, who can perform spin measurements, which they do at time $t_2$. The fact that the two electrons are a singlet means that if Alice measures z-spin up on her electron, Bob will measure z-spin down on his, and vice versa: the correlation is perfect. If Alice measures z-axis spin, and Bob measures the orthogonal y-axis spin, however, the correlation will be zero. Intermediate angles give intermediate correlations in a way that, on careful analysis, proves inconsistent with the idea that each particle has a definite, independent probability of producing the observed measurements (the correlations violate Bell's inequality).

This subtle dependence of one measurement on the other holds even when measurements are made simultaneously and a great distance apart, which gives the appearance of a superluminal communication taking place between the two electrons. Put simply, how can Bob's electron "know" what Alice measured on hers, so that it can adjust its own behavior accordingly?

=== Relational solution ===
In RQM, an interaction between a system and an observer is necessary for the system to have clearly defined properties relative to that observer. Since the two measurement events take place at spacelike separation, they do not lie in the intersection of Alice's and Bob's light cones. Indeed, there is no observer who can instantaneously measure both electrons' spin.

The key to the RQM analysis is to remember that the results obtained on each "wing" of the experiment only become determinate for a given observer once that observer has interacted with the other observer involved. As far as Alice is concerned, the specific results obtained on Bob's wing of the experiment are indeterminate for her, although she will know that Bob has a definite result. In order to find out what result Bob has, she has to interact with him at some time $t_3$ in their future light cones, through ordinary classical information channels.

The question then becomes one of whether the expected correlations in results will appear: will the two particles behave in accordance with the laws of quantum mechanics? Let us denote by $M_A(\alpha)$ the idea that the observer $A$ (Alice) measures the state of the system $\alpha$ (Alice's particle).

So, at time $t_2$, Alice knows the value of $M_A(\alpha)$: the spin of her particle, relative to herself. But, since the particles are in a singlet state, she knows that

$$M_A(\alpha)+M_A(\beta)=0 ,$$

and so if she measures her particle's spin to be $\sigma$, she can predict that Bob's particle ($\beta$) will have spin $-\sigma$. All this follows from standard quantum mechanics, and there is no "spooky action at a distance" yet. From the "coherence-operator" discussed above, Alice also knows that if at $t_3$ she measures Bob's particle and then measures Bob (that is asks him what result he got) – or vice versa – the results will be consistent:

$$M_A(B)=M_A(\beta)$$

Finally, if a third observer (Charles, say) comes along and measures Alice, Bob, and their respective particles, he will find that everyone still agrees, because his own "coherence-operator" demands that

$M_C(A)=M_C(\alpha)$ and $M_C(B)=M_C(\beta)$

while knowledge that the particles were in a singlet state tells him that

$$M_C(\alpha)+M_C(\beta) = 0.$$

Thus the relational interpretation, by shedding the notion of an "absolute state" of the system, allows for an analysis of the EPR paradox which neither violates traditional locality constraints, nor implies superluminal information transfer, since we can assume that all observers are moving at comfortable sub-light velocities. And, most importantly, the results of every observer are in full accordance with those expected by conventional quantum mechanics.

Whether or not this account of locality is successful has been a matter of debate.

== Derivation ==
A promising feature of this interpretation is that RQM offers the possibility of being derived from a small number of axioms, or postulates based on experimental observations. Rovelli's derivation of RQM uses three fundamental postulates. However, it has been suggested that it may be possible to reformulate the third postulate into a weaker statement, or possibly even do away with it altogether. The derivation of RQM parallels, to a large extent, quantum logic. The first two postulates are motivated entirely by experimental results, while the third postulate, although it accords perfectly with what we have discovered experimentally, is introduced as a means of recovering the full Hilbert space formalism of quantum mechanics from the other two postulates. The two empirical postulates are:

- Postulate 1: there is a maximum amount of relevant information that may be obtained from a quantum system.
- Postulate 2: it is always possible to obtain new information from a system.

We let $W\left(S\right)$ denote the set of all possible questions that may be "asked" of a quantum system, which we shall denote by $Q_i$, $i \in W$. We may experimentally find certain relations between these questions: $\left\{\land, \lor, \neg, \supset, \bot \right\}$, corresponding to {intersection, orthogonal sum, orthogonal complement, inclusion, and orthogonality} respectively, where $Q_1 \bot Q_2 \equiv Q_1 \supset \neg Q_2$.

=== Structure ===
From the first postulate, it follows that we may choose a subset $Q_c^{(i)}$ of $N$ mutually independent questions, where $N$ is the number of bits contained in the maximum amount of information. We call such a question $Q_c^{(i)}$ a complete question. The value of $Q_c^{(i)}$ can be expressed as an N-tuple sequence of binary valued numerals, which has $2^N = k$ possible permutations of "0" and "1" values. There will also be more than one possible complete question. If we further assume that the relations $\left\{\land, \lor\right\}$ are defined for all $Q_i$, then $W\left(S\right)$ is an orthomodular lattice, while all the possible unions of sets of complete questions form a Boolean algebra with the $Q_c^{(i)}$ as atoms.

The second postulate governs the event of further questions being asked by an observer $O_1$ of a system $S$, when $O_1$ already has a full complement of information on the system (an answer to a complete question). We denote by $p\left(Q|Q_c^{(j)}\right)$ the probability that a "yes" answer to a question $Q$ will follow the complete question $Q_c^{(j)}$. If $Q$ is independent of $Q_c^{(j)}$, then $p=0.5$, or it might be fully determined by $Q_c^{(j)}$, in which case $p=1$. There is also a range of intermediate possibilities, and this case is examined below.

If the question that $O_1$ wants to ask the system is another complete question, $Q_b^{(i)}$, the probability $p^{ij}=p\left(Q_b^{(i)}|Q_c^{(j)}\right)$ of a "yes" answer has certain constraints upon it:

1. $0 \leq p^{ij} \leq 1, \$

2. $\sum_{i} p^{ij} = 1, \$

3. $\sum_{j} p^{ij} = 1. \$

The three constraints above are inspired by the most basic of properties of probabilities, and are satisfied if

$$p^{ij} = \left|U^{ij}\right|^2$$,

where $U^{ij}$ is a unitary matrix.

- Postulate 3 If $b$ and $c$ are two complete questions, then the unitary matrix $U_{bc}$ associated with their probability described above satisfies the equality $U_{cd} = U_{cb}U_{bd}$, for all $b, c$ and $d$.

This third postulate implies that if we set a complete question $|Q^{(i)}_c \rangle$ as a basis vector in a complex Hilbert space, we may then represent any other question $|Q^{(j)}_b \rangle$ as a linear combination:

$$|Q^{(j)}_b \rangle = \sum_i U^{ij}_{bc} |Q^{(i)}_c \rangle.$$

And the conventional probability rule of quantum mechanics states that if two sets of basis vectors are in the relation above, then the probability $p^{ij}$ is

$$p^{ij} = |\langle Q^{(i)}_c | Q^{(j)}_b \rangle|^2 = |U_{bc}^{ij}|^2.$$

=== Dynamics ===
The Heisenberg picture of time evolution accords most easily with RQM. Questions may be labelled by a time parameter $t \rightarrow Q(t)$, and are regarded as distinct if they are specified by the same operator but are performed at different times. Because time evolution is a symmetry in the theory (it forms a necessary part of the full formal derivation of the theory from the postulates), the set of all possible questions at time $t_2$ is isomorphic to the set of all possible questions at time $t_1$. It follows, by standard arguments in quantum logic, from the derivation above that the orthomodular lattice $W(S)$ has the structure of the set of linear subspaces of a Hilbert space, with the relations between the questions corresponding to the relations between linear subspaces.

It follows that there must be a unitary transformation $U \left( t_2 - t_1 \right)$ that satisfies:

$$Q(t_2) = U \left( t_2 - t_1 \right) Q(t_1) U^{-1} \left( t_2 - t_1 \right)$$

and

$$U \left( t_2 - t_1 \right) = \exp({-i \left(t_2 - t_1 \right)H})$$

where $H$ is the Hamiltonian, a self-adjoint operator on the Hilbert space and the unitary matrices are an abelian group.

== Problems and discussion ==
The question is whether RQM denies any objective reality, or otherwise stated: there is only a subjectively knowable reality. Rovelli limits the scope of this claim by stating that RQM relates to the variables of a physical system and not to constant, intrinsic properties, such as the mass and charge of an electron. Indeed, mechanics in general only predicts the behavior of a physical system under various conditions. In classical mechanics this behavior is mathematically represented in a phase space with certain degrees of freedom; in quantum mechanics this is a state space, mathematically represented as a multidimensional complex Hilbert space, in which the dimensions correspond to the above variables. Dorato, however, argues that all intrinsic properties of a physical system, including mass and charge, are only knowable in a subjective interaction between the observer and the physical system. The unspoken thought behind this is that intrinsic properties are essentially quantum mechanical properties as well.

Rovelli clearly is concerned with the philosophical implications of his interpretation of quantum mechanics. He goes back to Anaximander. Photis Schurmans in her PhD links Rovelli's "web of meaning" as being the universe with Lambros Couloubaritsis' Polyplocology, the universe as an entangled web of stories.

== See also ==
- Coherence (physics)
- Measurement in quantum mechanics
- Measurement problem
- Philosophy of information
- Philosophy of physics
- Quantum decoherence
- Quantum entanglement
- Quantum information
- Quantum Zeno effect
- Schrödinger's cat
