= Mohammad Ilkhani =

Iranian philosopher (born 1958)

- محمد ایلخانی (Persian)
- Born: 1958 (age 67–68); Tehran, Iran

Education
- Thesis: La philosophie de la création chez Achard de Saint-Victor (1999)
- Doctoral advisor: Lambros Couloubaritsis

Philosophical work
- Era: 21st century philosophy
- Region: Western philosophy
- School: Medieval
- Main interests: Christian theology

Mohammad Ilkhani (Persian: محمد ایلخانی; born 1958) is an Iranian philosopher and professor and chair of the department of philosophy at the Shahid Beheshti University. He is known for his research on Achard of St. Victor, Boethius and Christian theology. Ilkhani received his PhD from Free University of Brussels under the supervision of Lambros Couloubaritsis.

== Bibliography ==
- La Philosophie de la creation chez chard de Saint Victor, Paris: Brielle's, 1999
- De unitate et pluritale, Achard's Latin text, translation and commentary, University of Dallas
- Boethius's Metaphysics, Tehran: Ilham, 2002
- History of Medieval philosophy, Tehran: SAMT, 2004
- Islamic and Western Schools and Universities in Middle Ages, Tehran: IHCS

== See also ==
- Iranian philosophy
