= Enneads =

Six collections of nine books by the Neoplatonic philosopher Plotinus

The Enneads (/ˈɛniædz/; Ancient Greek: Ἐννεάδες), fully The Six Enneads, is the collection of writings of the philosopher Plotinus, edited and compiled by his student Porphyry (c. AD 270). Plotinus was a student of Ammonius Saccas, and together they were founders of Neoplatonism. His work, through Augustine of Hippo, the Cappadocian Fathers, Pseudo-Dionysius the Areopagite and several subsequent Christian and Muslim thinkers, has greatly influenced Western and Near-Eastern thought.

== Contents ==
Porphyry edited the writings of Plotinus in fifty-four treatises, which vary greatly in length and number of chapters, mostly because he split original texts and joined others together to match this very number. Then, he proceeded to set the fifty-four treatises in groups of nine (Greek. ennea) or Enneads. He also collected The Enneads into three volumes. The first volume contained the first three Enneads (I, II, III), the second volume has the Fourth (IV) and the Fifth (V) Enneads, and the last volume was devoted to the remaining Ennead. After correcting and naming each treatise, Porphyry wrote a biography of his master, Life of Plotinus, intended to be an introduction to the Enneads.

Porphyry's edition does not follow the chronological order in which Enneads were written (see Chronological listing below), but responds to a plan of study which leads the learner from subjects related to his own affairs to subjects concerning the uttermost principles of the universe.

Although not exclusively, Porphyry writes in chapters 24–26 of the Life of Plotinus that the First Ennead deals with human or ethical topics, the Second and Third Enneads are mostly devoted to cosmological subjects or physical reality. The Fourth concerns the Soul, the Fifth knowledge and intelligible reality, and finally the Sixth covers being and what is above it, the One or first principle of all.

== Citing the Enneads ==
Since the publishing of a modern critical edition of the Greek text by Paul Henry and Hans-Rudolf Schwyzer (Plotini Opera. 3 volumes. Paris-Bruxelles, 1951–1973; H-S^{1} or editio major text) and the revised one (Plotini Opera. 3 volumes. Oxford: Clarendon Press, 1964–1984; referred to as the H-S^{2} or editio minor text) there is an academic convention of citing the Enneads by first mentioning the number of Ennead (usually in Romans from I to VI), the number of treatise within each Ennead (in arabics from 1 to 9), the number of chapter (in arabics also), and the line(s) in one of the mentioned editions. These numbers are divided by periods, commas, or blank spaces.

E.g. For Fourth Ennead (IV), treatise number seven (7), chapter two (2), lines one to five (1-5), we write:

- IV.7.2.1-5

E.g. The following three mean Third Ennead (III), treatise number five (5), chapter nine (9), line eight (8):

- III, 5, 9, 8
- 3,5,9,8
- III 5 9 8

It is important to remark that some translations or editions do not include the line numbers according to P. Henry and H.-R. Schwyzer's edition. In addition to this, the chronological order of the treatises is numbered between brackets or parentheses, and given below.

E.g. For the previously given:

- IV.7 (2).2.1-5 since treatise IV.7 was the second written by Plotinus.
- III, 5 [50], 9, 8 since III.5 was the fiftieth written by Plotinus.

== Table of contents ==
The names of treatises may differ according to translation. The numbers in square brackets before the individual works refer to the chronological order they were written according to Porphyry's Life of Plotinus.

=== First Ennead ===
- I.1 [53] - "What is the Living Being and What is Man?"
- I.2 [19] - "On Virtue"
- I.3 [20] - "On Dialectic [The Upward Way]."
- I.4 [46] - "On True Happiness (Well Being)"
- I.5 [36] - "On Whether Happiness (Well Being) Increases with Time."
- I.6 [1] - "On Beauty"
- I.7 [54] - "On the Primal Good and Secondary Forms of Good [Otherwise, 'On Happiness']"
- I.8 [51] - "On the Nature and Source of Evil"
- I.9 [16] - "On Dismissal"

=== Second Ennead ===
- II.1 [40] - "On Heaven"
- II.2 [14] - "On the Movement of Heaven"
- II.3 [52] - "Whether the Stars are Causes"
- II.4 [12] - "On Matter"
- II.5 [25] - "On Potentiality and Actuality"
- II.6 [17] - "On Quality or on Substance"
- II.7 [37] - "On Complete Transfusion"
- II.8 [35] - "On Sight or on How Distant Objects Appear Small"
- II.9 [33] - "Against Those That Affirm The Creator of the Cosmos and the Cosmos Itself to be Evil" [generally quoted as "Against the Gnostics"]

=== Third Ennead ===
- III.1 [3] - "On Fate"
- III.2 [47] - "On Providence (1)."
- III.3 [48] - "On Providence (2)."
- III.4 [15] - "On our Allotted Guardian Spirit"
- III.5 [50] - "On Love"
- III.6 [26] - "On the Impassivity of the Unembodied"
- III.7 [45] - "On Eternity and Time"
- III.8 [30] - "On Nature, Contemplation and the One"
- III.9 [13] - "Detached Considerations"

=== Fourth Ennead ===
- IV.1 [21] - "On the Essence of the Soul (1)"
- IV.2 [4] - "On the Essence of the Soul (2)"
- IV.3 [27] - "On Problems of the Soul (1)"
- IV.4 [28] - "On Problems of the Soul (2)"
- IV.5 [29] - "On Problems of the Soul (3)” [Also known as "On Sight"].
- IV.6 [41] - "On Sense-Perception and Memory"
- IV.7 [2] - "On the Immortality of the Soul"
- IV.8 [6] - "On the Soul's Descent into Body"
- IV.9 [8] - "Are All Souls One"

=== Fifth Ennead ===
- V.1 [10] - "On the Three Primary Hypostases"
- V.2 [11] - "On the Origin and Order of the Beings following after the First"
- V.3 [49] - "On the Knowing Hypostases and That Which is Beyond"
- V.4 [7] - "How That Which is After the First Comes from the First, and on the One."
- V.5 [32] - "That the Intellectual Beings are not Outside the Intellect, and on the Good"
- V.6 [24] - "On the Fact that That Which is Beyond Being Does not Think, and on What is the Primary and the Secondary Thinking Principle"
- V.7 [18] - "On Whether There are Ideas of Particular Beings"
- V.8 [31] - "On the Intellectual Beauty"
- V.9 [5] - "On Intellect, the Forms, and Being"

=== Sixth Ennead ===
- VI.1 [42] - "On the Kinds of Being (1)"
- VI.2 [43] - "On the Kinds of Being (2)"
- VI.3 [44] - "On the Kinds of Being (3)"
- VI.4 [22] - "On the Presence of Being, One and the Same, Everywhere as a Whole (1)"
- VI.5 [23] - "On the Presence of Being, One and the Same, Everywhere as a Whole (2)"
- VI.6 [34] - "On Numbers"
- VI.7 [38] - "How the Multiplicity of Forms Came Into Being, and on the Good"
- VI.8 [39] - "On Free Will and the Will of the One"
- VI.9 [9] - "On the Good, or the One"

=== Plotinus's original chronological order ===
The chronological listing is given by Porphyry (Life of Plotinus 4–6). The first 21 treatises (through IV.1) had already been written when Porphyry met Plotinus, so they were not necessarily written in the order shown.

- I.6, IV.7, III.1, IV.2, V.9, IV.8, V.4, IV.9, VI.9
- V.1, V.2, II.4, III.9, II.2, III.4, I.9, II.6, V.7
- I.2, I.3, IV.1, VI.4, VI.5, V.6, II.5, III.6, IV.3
- IV.4, IV.5, III.8, V.8, V.5, II.9, VI.6, II.8, I.5
- II.7, VI.7, VI.8, II.1, IV.6, VI.1, VI.2, VI.3, III.7
- I.4, III.2, III.3, V.3, III.5, I.8, II.3, I.1, I.7

In table format, the chronological order of Porphyry corresponding each of the Ennead treatises is:

Chronological order	Ennead treatise
1	1.6
2	4.7
3	3.1
4	4.2
5	5.9
6	4.8
7	5.4
8	4.9
9	6.9
10	5.1
11	5.2
12	2.4
13	3.9
14	2.2
15	3.4
16	1.9
17	2.6
18	5.7
19	1.2
20	1.3
21	4.1
22	6.4
23	6.5
24	5.6
25	2.5
26	3.6
27	4.3
28	4.4
29	4.5
30	3.8
31	5.8
32	5.5
33	2.9
34	6.6
35	2.8
36	1.5
37	2.7
38	6.7
39	6.8
40	2.1
41	4.6
42	6.1
43	6.2
44	6.3
45	3.7
46	1.4
47	3.2
48	3.3
49	5.3
50	3.5
51	1.8
52	2.3
53	1.1
54	1.7

== Note on the Plotiniana Arabica or Arabic Plotinus ==
After the fall of Western Roman Empire and during the period of the Byzantine Empire, the authorship of some Plotinus' texts became clouded. Many passages of Enneads IV-VI, now known as Plotiniana Arabica, circulated among Islamic scholars (as Al-Kindi, Al-Farabi and Avicenna) under the name The Theology of Aristotle or quoted as "Sayings of an old [wise] man". The writings had a significant effect on Islamic philosophy, due to Islamic interest in Aristotle. A Latin version of the so-called Theology appeared in Europe in 1519. (Cf. O'Meara, An Introduction to the Enneads. Oxford: 1995, 111ff.)

== Bibliography ==
Critical editions of the Greek text

- Bréhier, Émile. Plotin: Ennéades (with French translation), Collection Budé, 1924–1938.
- Henry, Paul, and Hans-Rudolf Schwyzer. Plotini Opera. (Editio maior in 3 vols. including English translation of Plotiniana Arabica or The Theology of Aristotle) Bruxelles and Paris: Museum Lessianum, 1951–1973.
- Henry, Paul, and Hans-Rudolf Schwyzer. Plotini Opera. (Editio minor in 3 vols.) Oxford: Clarendon Press, 1964–1982.

Complete English translations

- Taylor, Thomas. Collected Writings of Plotinus, Frome, Prometheus Trust, 1994. ISBN 1-898910-02-2 (contains approximately half of the Enneads)
- Guthrie, Kenneth Sylvan. Plotinos, Complete Works in 4 vols., Comparative Literature Press, 1918.
- Plotinus. The Enneads (translated by Stephen MacKenna), London, Medici Society, 1917–1930 (an online version is available at Sacred Texts); 2nd edition, B. S. Page (ed.), 1956.
- Armstrong, A. H. Plotinus. Enneads (with Greek text), Loeb Classical Library, 7 vol., 1966–1988.
- Gerson, Lloyd P. (ed.); George Boys-Stones, John M. Dillon, Lloyd P. Gerson, R.A. King, Andrew Smith and James Wilberding (trs.). The Enneads. Cambridge University Press, 2018.

Commentaries

- The Enneads of Plotinus Series. Edited by John M. Dillon and Andrew Smith. Parmenides Publishing. 2012–Ongoing.
- Atkinson, Michael. Plotinus' Ennead V.1: On the Three Principal Hypostases Oxford: OUP, 1983.
- Bussanich, John. The One and Its Relation to Intellect (Translation and commentary of selected treatises). Leiden: Brill, 1988.
- Fleet, Barrie. Plotinus Ennead III.6. Oxford: Clarendon Press, 1995.
- Kalligas, Paul. The Enneads of Plotinus: A Commentary (Volume 1: Enneads I–III). Princeton University Press, 2014.

Lexicons and bibliographies

- Sleeman, J. H. and Pollet, G. Lexikon Plotinianum. Leiden: Brill, 1980.
- Dufour, R. Plotinus. A Bibliography: 1950-2000. Leiden: Brill, 2002.
- Radice. R. and Bombacigno, R. Lexicon II: Plotinus. (Includes a CD containing the entire Greek text) Milan: Biblia, 2004.

== See also ==
- Allegorical interpretations of Plato
- Henosis
- Henology
