= Lycopolis (Delta) =

Segin al-Kom *ϣⲉϫⲓⲛ سجين الكوم
- Location in Egypt
- Coordinates: 30°54′31.18″N 31°3′19.71″E
- Country: Egypt
- Governorate: Gharbia

Population (2006)
  - Total: 25,623
- Time zone: UTC+2 (EET)
  - Summer (DST): UTC+3 (EEST)

Segin al-Kom (Arabic: سجين الكوم, from Coptic: *ϣⲉϫⲓⲛ, Ancient Egyptian: Škȝn) is a historical village in the Gharbia Governorate of Egypt.

It was known as Lycopolis or Lykopolis (Greek: Λυκούπολις) in the Antiquity, an ancient town in the Sebennytic nome in Lower Egypt.

== History ==
From its appellation, the city was apparently founded by a colony of Osirian priests from the town of Lycopolis in Upper Egypt.

The city is mentioned in the inscription on the Rosetta Stone. It was besieged by Ptolemy V (r. 204-180 BC) during a civil uprising:

He went to the stronghold of Shekan [which was] fortified by the enemy with every device... he laid siege to the stronghold in question with a wall around its exterior on account of the enemies who were within it who had inflicted great wrong upon Egypt, having abandoned the path of duty to Pharaoh and duty [to the] gods.

Ptolemy "seized the stronghold... by force in a short time" after cutting off its water supply and seizing the irrigation canals.

== See also ==
- List of ancient Egyptian towns and cities
