= Helgoland (book) =

Book by Carlo Rovelli

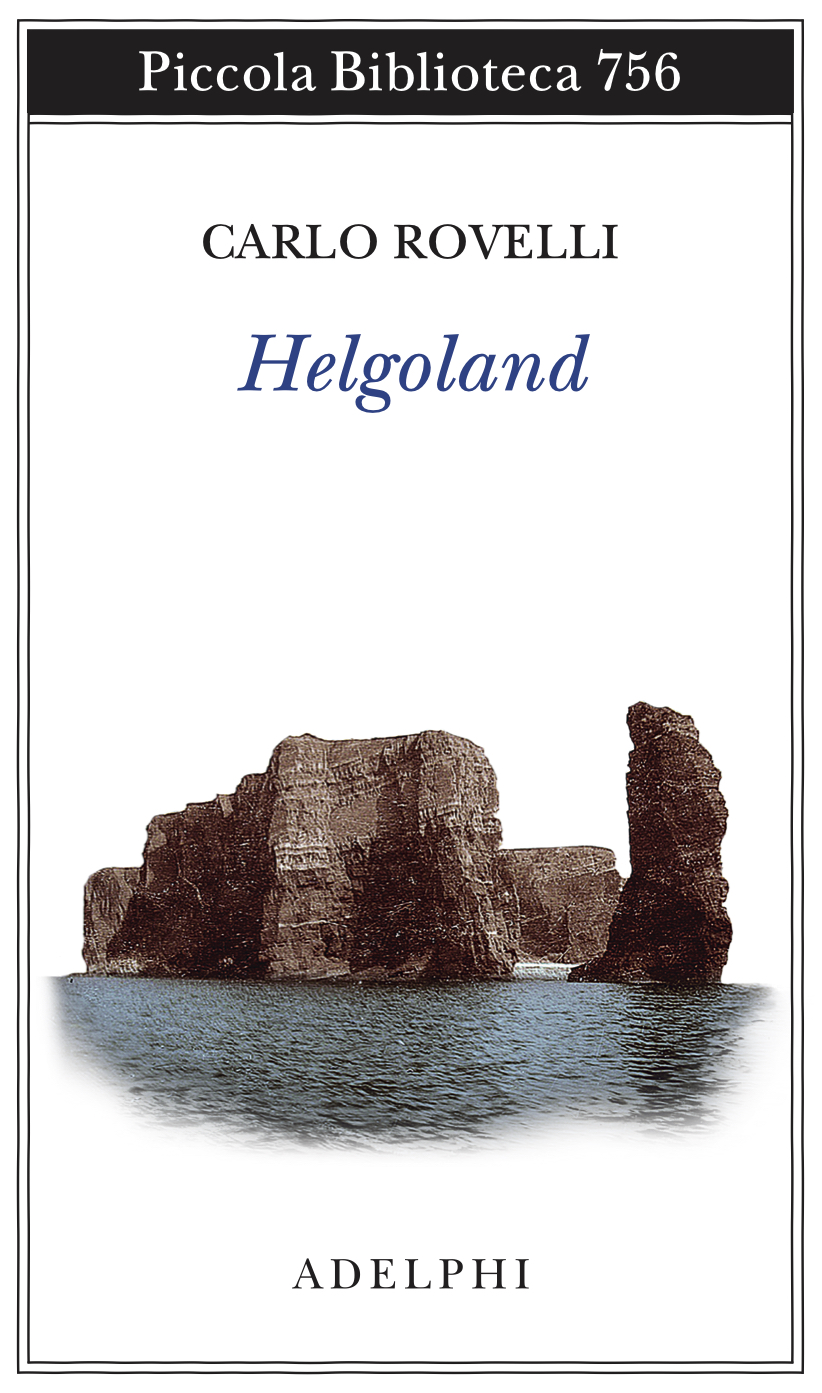
- First Italian edition (2020)
- Author: Carlo Rovelli
- Original title: Helgoland
- Language: Italian
- Subject: Physics
- Genre: Non-fiction
- Publisher: Penguin Books (English edition)
- Publication date: 2020
- Publication place: Italy
- English publication date: 2021
- Media type: Print, digital, audio CD
- Pages: 226 (Italian edition)
- ISBN: 88-459-3505-1 (Italian edition)

Helgoland is a book by Italian physicist Carlo Rovelli about quantum mechanics and the relational interpretation of it that Rovelli developed. The title refers to Heligoland, an island in the North Sea where Werner Heisenberg secluded himself while developing the basic ideas of quantum mechanics in 1925.

The book was first published in Italian in 2020, and an English translation by Erica Segre and Simon Carnell was published the following year. The Persian translation, translated by Samane Noroozi (Chatrang Publisher), was published the following year in Iran.

The book is divided into seven parts.

== Part One ==
I. Looking into a Strangely Beautiful Interior

"How a young German physicist arrived at an idea that was very strange indeed, but described the world remarkably well – and the great confusion that followed."

Rovelli discusses the approach developed by Heisenberg during he experience of isolation whilst staying on the island Helgoland in the summer of 1926. (p.12)

== Part Two ==
II. A Curious Bestiary of Extreme Ideas

III. Is It Possible That Something is Real in Relation to You But Not in Relation to Me?

IV. The Web of Relations That Weaves Reality

== Part Three ==
V. The Unambiguous Description of an Object Includes the Objects to Which It Manifests Itself

Aleksander Bogdanov

VI. ‘For Nature It is a Problem Already Solved’

VII. But is It Really Possible?
