= Ammonius of Alexandria (Christian philosopher) =

3rd century Alexandrian Christian philosopher

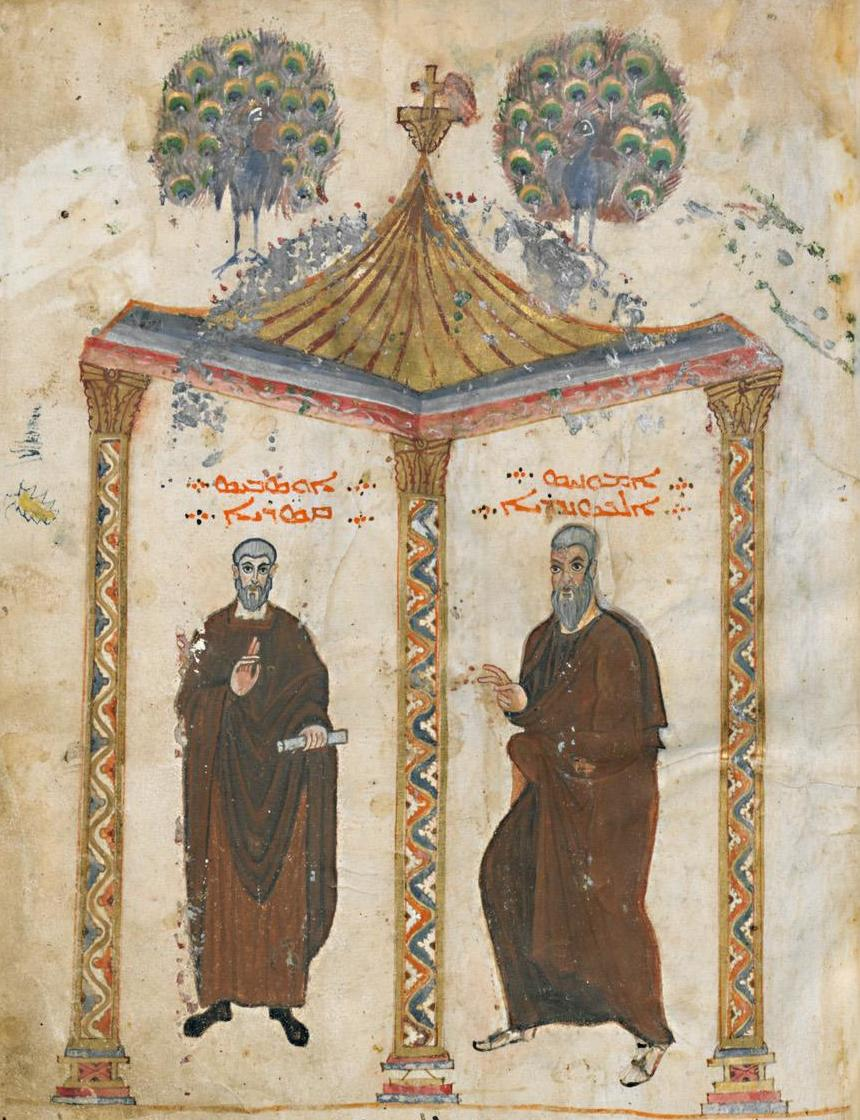
A portrait of St. Eusebius of Caesarea (left) and Ammonius of Alexandria (right), prefacing the letter Eusebius wrote to him in the Rabbula Gospels (6th cent. AD)

Ammonius of Alexandria (/əˈmoʊniəs/; Ancient Greek: Ἀμμώνιος) is assumed to be a Christian philosopher who lived in the 3rd century. He is possibly Ammonius Saccas, the Neoplatonist philosopher, also from Alexandria.

== Life ==
Eusebius, who is followed by Jerome, asserted that Ammonius was born a Christian, and remained faithful to Christianity throughout his life. He wrote that Ammonius produced several scholarly works, most notably The Harmony of Moses and Jesus. Eusebius also wrote that Ammonius composed a synopsis of the four canonical gospels, traditionally assumed to be the Ammonian Sections, now known as the Eusebian Canons.

Eusebius attacks Porphyry for saying that Ammonius apostatized early in his life and left no writings behind him, but Eusebius was presumably confusing Ammonius with the Neoplatonist of the same name.

Ammonius developed the forerunner of modern gospel harmony as the Ammonian Sections in which he started with the text of Matthew and copied along parallel events. However there are no extant copies of the harmony of Ammonius and it is only known from a single reference in the letter of Eusebius to Carpianus.
