= Cassius Longinus (philosopher) =

Neoplatonist philosopher (c.213–273)

- Born: c. 213 AD; Emesa, Syria
- Died: 273 AD; Emesa, Syria
- Occupations: Philosopher, rhetorician
- Writing career
- Period: Late antiquity
- Literary movement: Platonism

Cassius Longinus (/ˈkæʃəs lɒnˈdʒaɪnəs/; Greek: Κάσσιος Λογγῖνος; c. 213 – 273 AD) was a Greek rhetorician and philosophical critic. Born in either Emesa or Athens, he studied at Alexandria under Ammonius Saccas and Origen the Pagan, and taught for thirty years in Athens, one of his pupils being Porphyry. Longinus did not embrace the Neoplatonism then being developed by Plotinus, but continued as a Platonist of the old type and his reputation as a literary critic was immense. During a visit to the east, he became a teacher, and subsequently chief counsellor to Zenobia, queen of Palmyra. It was by his advice that she endeavoured to regain her independence from Rome. Emperor Aurelian, however, crushed the revolt, and Longinus was executed.

== Life ==
The origin of his gentile name Cassius is unknown; it can only be conjectured that he was the client to some Cassius Longinus, or that his ancestors had received the Roman franchise through the influence of some Cassius Longinus. He was born about 213, and was killed in 273, at the age of sixty. The suggestion that his original name was Dionysius arose only because the 1st century rhetorical treatise On the Sublime was ascribed to a "Dionysius or Longinus" in the medieval period.

His native place is uncertain; some say that Longinus was a born in Emesa, while others say he was born in Athens. The Suda states that Fronto of Emesa, the uncle of Longinus, taught rhetoric at Athens, and on his death in Athens left behind him Longinus, the son of his sister Frontonis.

It would seem that Fronto took special care of the education of his nephew, and on his death-bed he made him his heir. In the preface to his work On Ends, which is preserved in Porphyry's Life of Plotinus, Longinus himself relates that from his early age he made many journeys with his parents, that he visited many countries and became acquainted with all those who at the time enjoyed a great reputation as philosophers, among whom the most illustrious were Ammonius Saccas, Origen the Pagan, Plotinus, and Amelius. Of the first two Longinus was a pupil for a long time, but Longinus did not embrace the Neoplatonism then being developed by Ammonius and Plotinus, rather he continued as a Platonist of the old type.

Longinus in his study of philosophy made himself thoroughly familiar with Plato's works; and that he himself was a genuine Platonist is evident from the fragments still extant, as well as from the commentaries he wrote on several of Plato's dialogues. The few fragments of his commentaries which have come down to us show that he was free from the allegorical notions by which his contemporaries claimed to have discovered the wisdom of the ancients. His commentaries not only explained the subject-matter discussed by Plato, but also his style and diction. In opposition to Plotinus, Longinus upheld the doctrine that the Platonic ideas existed outside the divine Nous. Plotinus, after reading his treatise On First Principles, remarked that Longinus might be a scholar, but that he was no philosopher.

After Longinus had learnt all he could from Ammonius at Alexandria and the other philosophers whom he met in his travels, he returned to Athens. He there devoted himself with so much zeal to the instruction of his many pupils that he scarcely had any time left for writing. The most distinguished of his pupils was Porphyry. At Athens, Longinus seems to have lectured on philosophy and criticism, as well as on rhetoric and grammar, and the extent of his knowledge was so great, that Eunapius calls him "a living library" and "a walking museum;". The power for which Longinus was most celebrated was his critical skill, which was indeed so great that the expression "to judge like Longinus" became synonymous with "to judge correctly".

After having spent much of his life at Athens composing the best of his works, he went to the East, either to see his friends at Emesa or to settle some family affairs. It seems to have been on that occasion that he became known to queen Zenobia of Palmyra, who, being a woman of great talent, and fond of the arts and literature, made him her teacher of Greek literature. As Longinus had no extensive library at his command at Palmyra, he was obliged almost entirely to abandon his literary pursuits. He soon discovered another use for his talents, for when king Odaenathus died Queen Zenobia undertook the government of the empire. She availed herself of the advice of Longinus; it was he who advised and encouraged her to shake off Roman rule and become an independent sovereign. As a result, Zenobia wrote a spirited letter to the Roman emperor Aurelian. In 273, when Aurelian took and destroyed Palmyra, Longinus had to pay with his life for the advice which he had given to Zenobia. Longinus must have been especially pained by this catastrophe, as the queen asserted her own innocence after having fallen into the hands of the Romans, and threw all the blame upon her advisers, particularly Longinus. He bore his execution with a firmness and cheerfulness worthy of Socrates.

In his private life Longinus seems to have been amiable; for although his pupil Porphyry left him, declaring that he would seek a better philosophy in the school of Plotinus, Longinus did not show him any ill-will, but continued to treat him as a friend, and invited him to come to Palmyra. He had an ardent love of liberty, and a great frankness both in expressing his own opinions and exposing the faults and errors of others.

== Writings ==
Notwithstanding his many avocations, Longinus composed a great number of works, which appear to have been held in the highest estimation, all of which have perished. It was once thought that the extant rhetorical treatise On the Sublime was written by him, but it is now thought to have been written by an unknown 1st century writer. Among the works listed by the Suda there are Homeric Questions, Homeric Problems and Solutions, Whether Homer is a Philosopher, and two publications on Attic diction. The most important of his philological works, Philological Discourses, consisting of at least 21 books, is omitted. A considerable fragment of his On the Chief End is preserved by Porphyry. Under his name there are also extant Prolegomena to the Handbook of Hephaestion on metre, and the fragment of a treatise on rhetoric, inserted in the middle of a similar treatise by Apsines. It gives brief practical hints on invention, arrangement, style, memory and other things useful to the student.
