= Lambros Couloubaritsis =

Greek-born Belgian philosopher (born 1941)

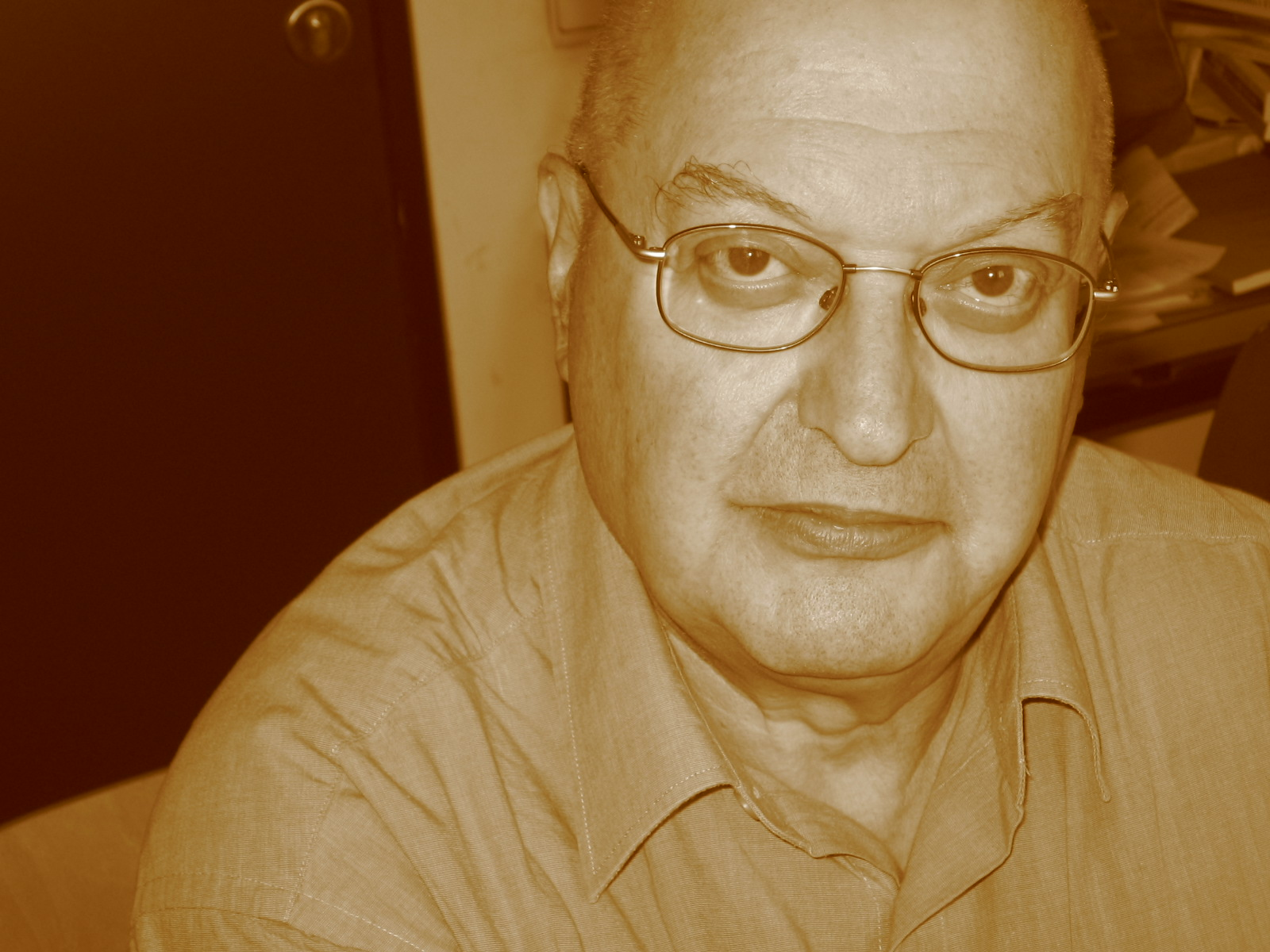
- Born: 1941 (age 84–85); Belgian Congo

Philosophical work
- Era: 21st-century philosophy
- Region: Western philosophy
- School: Medieval
- Main interests: Christian theology

Lambros Couloubaritsis (born 1941) is a Greek-born Belgian philosopher.

== Life ==
Lambros Couloubaritsis received his PhD in philosophy from the Free University of Brussels after studying chemistry at the University of Liège. He teaches philosophy at the Free University of Brussels, where he is also the director of Ancient Philosophy Center. He is internationally recognized as a specialist of Aristotle. He has received honorary doctorates from the universities of Oradea, Crete, Athens, Liège and Charles de Gaulle University – Lille III.

Couloubaritsis is the author of numerous articles and books on ancient and medieval philosophy. He was awarded the Montyon Prize, the Gegner Prize of Académie des Sciences Morales et Politiques and Duculot Prize of Royal Academy of Science, Letters and Fine Arts of Belgium. Couloubaritsis is also the editor of Revue de philosophie ancienne.

In his work about complexity he coins the term 'polyplocology', from the Greek ‘logos’ (account of), ‘polys’ (multiple) and ‘plokè’ which means ‘interweaving’ as well as ‘plot’, with the same etymological root as ‘complexity’ and ‘complicated’, i.e. woven together, to apprehend complexity philosophically. The many entangled in the one, unifying personal and shared experiences, co-determining the whole and its parts.

== Bibliography ==
- La philosophie face à la question de la complexité. Le défi majeur du 21e siècle. Tome 1 Complexités intuitive, archaïque et historique (Bruxelles, Ousia, 2014); Tome 2 Complexités scientifique et contemporaine. (Bruxelles, Ousia, 2014)
- La proximité et la question de la souffrance humaine (Bruxelles, Ousia, 2005)
- Histoire de la philosophie ancienne et médiévale, Figures illustres (Paris, Grasset, 1998)
- La Physique d'Aristote (Bruxelles, Ousia, 1998, ISBN 2-87060-062-3)
- Aux origines de la philosophie européenne, De la pensée archaïque au néoplatonisme (Bruxelles, De Boeck, 1992; 3e éd. 2000; 4e édition 2004)
- Traduction, avec introduction et commentaires, du livre II de la Physique d'Aristote, Sur la Nature (Paris, Vrin, 1992)
- Mythe et Philosophie chez Parménide (Bruxelles, Ousia, 1986; 2e éd., 1990)
- Penser l'Informatique, Informatiser la Pensée. Mélanges offerts à André Robinet (Bruxelles, Editions de l'Universite de Bruxelles, 1987)
- L'avènement de la science physique (Bruxelles, Ousia, 1980)

== See also ==
- Mohammad Ilkhani
- Carlo Rovelli

== Sources ==
- Centre de philosophie ancienne à l'ULB
- Lambros Couloubaritsis, docteur honoris causa de l'université Lille 3
- « L’initié, le poète, le philosophe : les chemins du savoir dans le papyrus de Derveni»
