= Ammonius Saccas =

Hellenistic Platonist philosopher (175–243)

- Born: 175; Alexandria, Roman Egypt
- Died: 243 (aged 67–68); Alexandria, Roman Egypt

Philosophical work
- Era: Ancient philosophy
- Region: Western philosophy
- School: Neoplatonism
- Notable students: Origen of Alexandria; Origen the Pagan; Plotinus
- Main interests: Metaphysics
- Notable ideas: Immateriality of the soul

Ammonius Saccas (/əˈmoʊniəs/; Ancient Greek: Ἀμμώνιος Σακκᾶς; 175–243 AD) was a Hellenistic Neoplatonic self-taught philosopher from Alexandria, Roman Egypt, generally regarded as the precursor of Neoplatonism or one of its founders. He is mainly known as the teacher of Plotinus, whom he taught from 232 to 243. He was undoubtedly the most significant influence on Plotinus in his development of Neoplatonism, although little is known about his own philosophical views. Later Christian writers stated that Ammonius was a Christian, but it is now generally assumed that there was a different Ammonius of Alexandria who wrote biblical texts.

== Life ==
=== Disputed origins ===
India

The origins and meaning of Ammonius' cognomen, "Sakkas", are disputed. Many scholars have interpreted it as indicating he was a porter in his youth, a view supported in antiquity by Byzantine bishop Theodoret. Others have asserted that this is a misreading of "Sakkas" for "sakkophoros" (porter). Some others have connected the cognomen with the "Śākyas", an ancient ruling clan of India, claiming that Ammonius Saccas was of Indian origin. This view has been both subsequently contested and supported by more recent scholarship. Some scholars supporting Ammonius' Indian origin have also contended that this ancestry is consistent with the passion of his foremost student Plotinus for India, and helps to explain the philosophical similarities between Vedanta and Neoplatonism, which many scholars attribute to Indian influence.

Greece

On the other hand, scholars contesting his Indian origins point out that Ammonius was from the Brucheion quarter of Alexandria, which was the royal quarter of the city inhabited mostly by Greeks, and that the name "Ammonius" was common to many Greeks, with a number of scholars and historians supporting a Greek origin for Ammonius.

Egypt

However, his name is theophoric to the deity Amun, indicating possible Egyptian origins.

== Teaching ==
=== Plotinus ===
Most details of Ammonius' life come from the fragments left from Porphyry's writings. The most famous pupil of Ammonius Saccas was Plotinus, who studied under Ammonius for eleven years. According to Porphyry, in 232, at the age of 28, Plotinus went to Alexandria to study philosophy:

In his twenty-eighth year he [Plotinus] felt the impulse to study philosophy and was recommended to the teachers in Alexandria who then had the highest reputation; but he came away from their lectures so depressed and full of sadness that he told his trouble to one of his friends. The friend, understanding the desire of his heart, sent him to Ammonius, whom he had not so far tried. He went and heard him, and said to his friend, "This is the man I was looking for." From that day he stayed continually with Ammonius and acquired so complete a training in philosophy that he became eager to make acquaintance with the Persian philosophical discipline and that prevailing among the Indians.

== Synchretic background ==
Ammonius came from a diverse intellectual and religious background. According to Porphyry, the parents of Ammonius were Christians, but upon learning Greek philosophy, Ammonius rejected his parents' religion for paganism. This conversion is contested by the Christian writers Jerome and Eusebius, who state that Ammonius remained a Christian throughout his lifetime:

[Porphyry] plainly utters a falsehood (for what will not an opposer of Christians do?) when he says that ... Ammonius fell from a life of piety into heathen customs. ... Ammonius held the divine philosophy unshaken and unadulterated to the end of his life. His works yet extant show this, as he is celebrated among many for the writings which he has left.

However, we are told by Longinus that Ammonius wrote nothing, and if Ammonius was the principal influence on Plotinus, then it is unlikely that Ammonius would have been a Christian. One way to explain much of the confusion concerning Ammonius is to assume that there were two people called Ammonius: Ammonius Saccas who taught Plotinus, and an Ammonius the Christian who wrote biblical texts. Another explanation might be that there was only one Ammonius but that Origen, who found the Neoplatonic views of his teacher essential to his own beliefs about the essential nature of Christianity, chose to suppress Ammonius' choice of Paganism over Christianity. The insistence of Eusebius, Origen's pupil, and Jerome, all of whom were recognized Fathers of the Christian Church, that Ammonius Saccas had not rejected his Christian roots would be easier for Christians to accept than the assertion of Porphyry, who was a Pagan, that Ammonius had chosen Paganism over Christianity.

To add to the confusion, it seems that Ammonius had two pupils called Origen: Origen the Christian, and Origen the Pagan. It is quite possible that Ammonius Saccas taught both Origens. And since there were two Origens who were accepted as contemporaries it was easy for later Christians to accept that there were two individuals named Ammonius, one a Christian and one a Pagan. Among Ammonius' other pupils there were Herennius and Cassius Longinus.

== Philosophy ==
Hierocles, writing in the 5th century, states that Ammonius' fundamental doctrine was that Plato and Aristotle were in full agreement with each other:

He was the first who had a godly zeal for the truth in philosophy and despised the views of the majority, which were a disgrace to philosophy. He apprehended well the views of each of the two philosophers [Plato and Aristotle] and brought them under one and the same nous and transmitted philosophy without conflicts to all of his disciples, and especially to the best of those acquainted with him, Plotinus, Origen, and their successors.

According to Nemesius, a bishop and Neoplatonist c. 400, Ammonius held that the soul was immaterial.

Little is known about Ammonius's role in the development of Neoplatonism. Porphyry seems to suggest that Ammonius was instrumental in helping Plotinus think about philosophy in new ways:

But he [Plotinus] did not just speak straight out of these books but took a distinctive personal line in his consideration, and brought the mind of Ammonius' to bear on the investigation in hand.

Two of Ammonius's students – Origen the Pagan, and Longinus – seem to have held philosophical positions which were closer to Middle Platonism than Neoplatonism, which perhaps suggests that Ammonius's doctrines were also closer to those of Middle Platonism than the Neoplatonism developed by Plotinus (see the Enneads), but Plotinus does not seem to have thought that he was departing in any significant way from that of his master. Like Porphyry (The Life of Plotinus, 3, 24–29), Nemesius also refers to Ammonius Saccas as the teacher or the master of Plotinus (Nemesius, Nature of Man, 2.103).

== See also ==
- Theodidaktos
