= Henology =

Philosophical discourse surrounding "The One"

Henology (from Ancient Greek ἕν (hen) 'one') stems from the pre-Socratic philosophical search for an arche or First principle, or the reduction of the variety of existences back to a single stuff or substance. The Multiple and Being are the One which is not a subspecies of anything.

== Ancient philosophy ==
Plato addresses the One and the plurality as a dialectical problem, the One is a generic form which extends through many forms that lie apart, i.e. the One is identified as the transcendent Good. In Neoplatonic tradition, Parmenides' primary bodies or substances are considered a transcendent One.

For Aristotle the One is a 'transcendental', the measure of everything. There are four modes of the One and the Multiple: continuous/discontinuous; whole/parts; universals (specificity, kind, analogy); and things numerically one (in each category). These modes are supplemented with essential attributes of the One and the Multiple: identity, otherness, difference, similar, dissimilar, equal, unequal, opposite, etc. Based on these he develops the different possible relations of multiple things and the One: the synonymic, almost homonymic, unity in succession, etc. Moreover, in his analysis of the One and the Multiple, he introduces his theory of the Four causes in an attempt to organize the whole universe without any reference to the invisible. Reality is constituted by distinctiveness.

For Plotinus realities (Hypostases), in hierarchic order, are the One, the Intellect and the Soul which he integrates into a complex metaphysical and ethical worldview. The One is a transcendent first principle that is beyond Being, apprehension, and description. It is the immobile center of all our motions (e.g. sensation, discursive reasoning). Being is associated with the Intellect, with what is thinkable and thought, since without it the intellect would be idle, and Being without intellect would be nothing. Plotinus defends the absolute transcendence of the One and at same time its immanence by means of the Intellect and the Soul. The One is everywhere and at the same time nowhere.

The Neoplatonists since Plotinus approached it as a theological practice of the transcendent Divine One situated above Being. As such the Neoplatonists unify the Whole around the One, by considering the One as an emergent power which is everywhere and at the same time nowhere, because it is above all and beyond the Whole. However until the 13th century it is more often the metaphysical account of the One and the Multiple.

== Medieval philosophy ==
It is Thomas Aquinas who brought down henology to the advantage of ontology in De Veritate, where the One becomes the negative of Being, as a result of the divine process of division. He promotes dialectics and looks for simplicity through the generalization of being at the expense of the One which can be converted in Being. Reality is constituted by the individual through which intelligence thinks. Abstraction is the means to shape Being as well as what is shared by everything and as what transcends them because it is the condition for them to be. The transcendental refers to the general properties of Being: One, True and Good.

== Early modern period ==
Francis Bacon associates henology and alchemy. He thought that every body contains a 'naturating nature' which maintains the unity of the form in unifying its elements and on which one can act to reproduce or transform it. Metaphysical knowledge can only be obtained by knowing the possible realities of the past, the present and the future.

René Descartes discards ontology in favor of henology based on Aristotle's continuous/discontinuous mode integrating the Neoplatonist hypostases in his conception of 'substance'. He identifies three substances: God, which is supremely perfect and cause of itself; the passive corporeal substance which is the immediate subject of extension and of occurrences which presuppose extension of the shape, the situation, the local movement, etc. and therefore is divisible; and the active non extended incorporeal substance which is the subject in which thinking resides and is called the Soul, which is indivisible. For compounds, the idea is that the whole is identical to the sum of its parts.

Baruch Spinoza demonstrates that in nature there are objective orders of magnitude, which are associated with reciprocal actions and interactions. The distinction between the ’whole’ and its ‘parts’ appears to be relative: what is a part at one level becomes a whole at another, and vice versa. In the interplay between naturating and natured nature, the parts are the result of a process of individuation of an unfinished whole, where the whole acts on its parts and the parts on the whole. For Spinoza, things are parts of a whole when they both adapt to each other as harmoniously as possible. When modified, each entity must be considered part of the whole universe, i.e. it must agree with the whole it belongs to and has to cohere with the other entities. The distinction between the whole and its parts is relative..

Gottfried Wilhelm Leibniz advances an inverse henological practice, i.e. one dominated by the multiple. His finite monads, which are simple, that is indivisible or the multiple, encompass the infinite, the One or God, they are part of a scale dependent organizational system, i.e. a pre-established harmony. This harmony provides an infinite multiplicity of intersections based on the essential unity of the whole, however without relations or interactions between the monads.

In wanting to establish a transcendental logic which surpasses classical logic which is more appropriate for ontology, Immanuel Kant, rejects the original meaning of the transcendental as the general properties of Being. Kant introduces a new interpretation of henology by the use of connections, relationships, syntheses and unifications. He does not problematize Being but discards what is (Being) in favor of what appears to the subject and the organism, and what organizes it to achieve a theory of knowledge which can be considered a henology of human activities.

== Modern period ==
Georg Wilhelm Friedrich Hegel continues Kant's effort to dismiss ontology. He proposes a new practice of the One and the Multiple. Hegel uses the notions of being, essence, concept and idea which are linked to each other. Measurement of the qualities of 'what is' transforms them into quantities, i.e. their essence. Three essences succeed each other: as reflection in oneself; as the phenomenon itself and its connections; and as factual reality which consists of substance, cause, action and reciprocal reaction. To come to the notions of concept proper, teleological concept (the science of ends) and idea. In his knowledge theory the idea is the immediate unity of the concept and reality; it is a whole where the parts do not exist for themselves, but through the whole and in the whole and where the whole is not less through its parts. It is an organic system.

Karl Marx chooses to depart from Hegel's organist approach by introducing the concept of 'set' - Marx's interpretation of the whole in the context of social relationships - thereby de-totalizing the whole by itself. In doing so, instead of uniting a multiplicity of properties to make a whole, an indefinite scope of metamorphoses and historical transformations is opened. The relationship between the One and the Multiple is seen as a non-totalizing whole characterized by historical and current connections and relationships.

For Alfred North Whitehead the role of philosophy is to recover the totality which is obscured by simplification or selection. Everything which is actualized contributes to the circumstances of its origins and is dependent on its history and environment to constitute its individuality. Therefor it is also stands in relationship with whatever else is actualized. Knowledge theoretically, consciousness obscures the totality from which it originates and which it embodies.

When Edgar Morin sees unity he also sees diversity as part of the unity and when there is diversity one looks for unity. He approaches the One and the Multiple in their reciprocal, recursive and retroactive relation within which the multiple is scale dependent. In his thinking, the whole can as well be more as less than the sum of its parts. For Morin the whole cannot be reduced to its parts, nor the parts to the whole, which have to be considered together with their antagonisms and complementary nature. The whole is considered a unitas multiplex (a dynamic differentiated whole, a concrete object organized as a system) in which antagonistic terms are necessarily coupled. Thereby the whole becomes a macro-unit and its parts have a double identity, their own which cannot be reduced to the whole and a shared one. .

== Areas of inquiry ==
Since Plotinus (ca. 204-270), henology is generally considered to be a theological practice of the divine one transcending being, subsequently this evolved to an ontologisation of metaphysics starting with Aquinas while the theological aspect lost its primacy. Martin Heidegger's fundamental ontology and/or Edmund Husserl and the analytical philosophy's formal ontology opt for an extreme reading of henology where the One and the Multiple are absorbed into univocal Being. Starting from Leibniz, whose monads prompt the prevalence of the multiple, relativizing the One to the perspective of each monad, henology is transformed in its opposite: ‘diaphorology’ (from the ancient Greek 'diaphora' or 'difference'). Postmodern philosophy reversed the previous tendency to emphasise the importance of the One as being by focusing on the Multiple, on alterity, because being would be the result of becoming, identity that of difference, and the one the consequence of the multiple. In associating the perspective of alterity to the Multiple, philosophers such as Jacques Derrida, Gilles Deleuze, Alain Badiou and the second Ludwig Wittgenstein, have opted for the other extreme practice: the domination of the Multiple. However, there are various philosophical interpretations possible of the One and the Multiple. In both cases, complexity is reduced to one of the extremes within henology without taking into consideration the possible relations, interactions, and entanglements of the One and the Multiple. Neither of them reflect on the totality and multiplicity of the One, hence both dismiss metaphysical questions.

== See also ==
- Transcendentals
- Metaphysics
