= Plotinus =

Egyptian philosopher (c. 204/5–270)

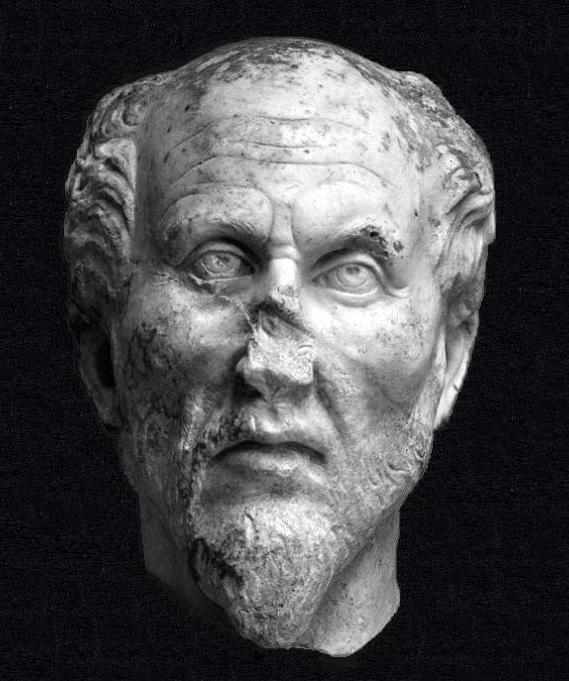
- Head in white marble. The identification as Plotinus is plausible but not proven.
- Born: c. 204/5 AD; Asyut or Lycopolis, Egypt, Roman Empire
- Died: 270 (aged 64–65) AD; Campania, Roman Empire

Education
- Academic advisor: Ammonius Saccas

Philosophical work
- Era: Ancient philosophy
- Region: Western philosophy
- School: Neoplatonism
- Notable students: Porphyry
- Main interests: Platonism, metaphysics, mysticism
- Notable works: The Enneads
- Notable ideas: Emanation of all things from the One; Three main hypostases: the One, Intellect, and Soul; Henosis

Plotinus (/plɒˈtaɪnəs/; Ancient Greek: Πλωτῖνος, Plōtînos; c. 204/5 – 270 AD) was an Egyptian philosopher and scholar. He specialized in Ancient Greek philosophy. He is widely regarded by modern scholars as the founder of Neoplatonism.

Plotinus was a student of the self-taught philosopher Ammonius Saccas, who belonged to the Platonic tradition. Historians in the 19th century coined the term "Neoplatonism" to describe Plotinus and his philosophy. This philosophical tradition was vastly influential during late antiquity, the Middle Ages, and the Renaissance.

In his metaphysical writings, Plotinus described three fundamental principles: the One, the Intellect, and the Soul. His works have inspired generations of pagan, Jewish, Christian, Gnostic, and early Islamic metaphysicians and mystics. His ideas shaped metaphysical works, particularly his work on duality of the One. These ideas later influenced several mainstream theological concepts within different religions.

== Early life ==
Plotinus' student and biographer Porphyry records in his Life of Plotinus that Plotinus died at the age of sixty-six at the end of the second year of the reign of the Roman emperor Claudius II (269/70 AD), and therefore calculates that Plotinus was born in the thirteenth year of the reign of Septimius Severus (204/5 AD). Eunapius reported that Plotinus was born in Lyco, which could either refer to the modern Asyut in Upper Egypt or Deltaic Lycopolis, in Lower Egypt. This has led to speculations that his family was either (Hellenized) Egyptian, Greek, or Roman. Historian Lloyd P. Gerson states that Plotinus was "almost certainly" a Greek. A.H. Armstrong, one of the foremost authorities on the philosophical teachings of Plotinus, writes that: "All that can be said with reasonable certainty is that Greek was his normal language and that he had a Greek education". Plotinus himself was said to have had little interest in his ancestry, birthplace, or that of anyone else for that matter. His native language was Greek.

Plotinus had an inherent distrust of materiality (an attitude common to Platonism), holding to the view that phenomena were a poor image or mimicry (mimesis) of something "higher and intelligible" (Enneads VI.I) which was the "truer part of genuine Being". This distrust of material world extended to the human body, including his own; it is reported by Porphyry that at one point he refused to have his portrait painted, presumably because he regarded bodily appearance as an inferior representation. Likewise, Plotinus never discussed his ancestry, childhood, or his place or date of birth. From all accounts his personal and social life exhibited the highest moral and spiritual standards.

== Thought ==
Plotinus took up the study of philosophy at the age of twenty-eight, around the year 232, and travelled to Alexandria to study. There he was dissatisfied with every teacher he encountered, until an acquaintance suggested he listen to the ideas of the self-taught Platonist philosopher Ammonius Saccas. Upon hearing Ammonius' lecture, Plotinus declared to his friend: "this is the man I was looking for". He began to study intently under his new instructor and remained with him as his student for eleven years. Besides Ammonius, Plotinus was also influenced by the philosophical works of Aristotle, the pre-Socratic philosophers Empedocles and Heraclitus, the Middle Platonist philosophers Alexander of Aphrodisias and Numenius of Apamea, along with various Stoics and Neopythagoreans.

== Career ==
=== Expedition to Persia and return to Rome ===
After having spent eleven years in Alexandria, he then decided, at the age of around thirty-eight, to investigate the philosophical teachings of the Persian and Indian philosophers. In the pursuit of this endeavor he left Alexandria and joined the army of the Roman emperor Gordian III as it marched on Persia (242–243). However, the campaign ended in a failure and after Gordian's eventual death, Plotinus found himself abandoned in a hostile land. It was with great difficulty that found his way back to safety in Antioch.

At the age of forty, during the reign of Emperor Philip the Arab, he came to Rome, where he stayed for most of the remainder of his life. There he attracted a number of students. His innermost circle included Porphyry, Amelius Gentilianus of Tuscany, the senator Castricius Firmus, and Eustochius of Alexandria, a doctor who devoted himself to learning from Plotinus and attended to him until his death. Other students included: Zethos, an Arab by ancestry who died before Plotinus, leaving him a legacy and some land; Zoticus, a critic and poet; Paulinus, a doctor of Scythopolis; and Serapion from Alexandria. He had students amongst the Roman Senate beside Castricius, such as Marcellus Orontius, Sabinillus, and Rogantianus. Women were also numbered amongst his students, including Gemina, in whose house he lived during his residence in Rome, and her daughter, also Gemina; and Amphiclea, the wife of Ariston, the son of Iamblichus. Finally, Plotinus corresponded with the philosopher Cassius Longinus.

== Works ==
=== The Enneads ===
Plotinus wrote the essays that became the Enneads (from Greek ἐννέα (ennéa), or group of nine) over a period of several years from c. 253 until a few months before his death seventeen years later. Porphyry makes note that the Enneads, before being compiled and arranged by himself, were merely the enormous collection of notes and essays which Plotinus used in his lectures and debates, rather than a formal book. Plotinus was unable to revise his own work due to his poor eyesight, yet his writings required extensive editing, according to Porphyry: his master's handwriting was atrocious, he did not properly separate his words, and he cared little for niceties of spelling. Plotinus intensely disliked the editorial process, and turned the task to Porphyry, who polished and edited them into their modern form.

== Later life ==
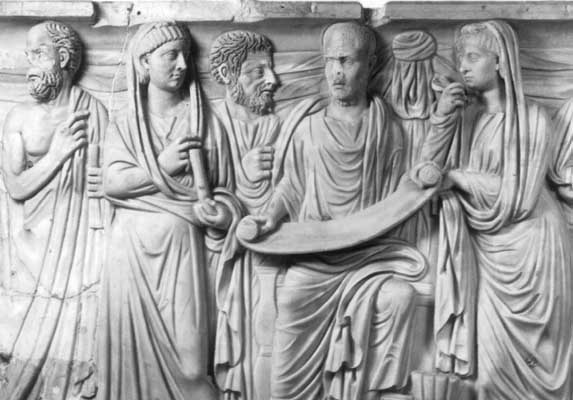
Presumed depiction of Plotinus and his disciples on a Roman sarcophagus in the Museo Gregoriano Profano, Vatican Museums, Rome

While living in Rome, Plotinus gained the respect of the Roman Emperor Gallienus and his wife Salonina. At one point, Plotinus attempted to persuade Gallienus to rebuild an abandoned settlement in Campania as the 'City of Philosophers', where the inhabitants would live under the constitution as set out in Plato's Laws. An Imperial subsidy was never granted for reasons unknown to Porphyry, who reports the incident.

== Death ==
Plotinus subsequently went to live in Sicily. He spent his final days in seclusion on an estate in Campania which his friend Zethos had bequeathed him. According to the account of Eustochius, who attended him at the end, Plotinus' final words were: "Try to raise the divine in yourselves to the divine in the all." Eustochius records that a snake crept under the bed where Plotinus lay, and slipped away through a hole in the wall; at the same moment the philosopher died.

Porphyry reported that Plotinus was sixty-six years old when he died in 270 AD and calculated his birthdate from that figure.

== Philosophy ==
=== The One ===
Plotinus taught that there is a supreme, totally transcendent "One" (τὸ Ἕν, tò Hén), containing no division, multiplicity, or distinction; beyond all categories of being and non-being. His "One" "cannot be any existing thing", nor is it merely the sum of all things (compare the Stoic doctrine of disbelief in non-material existence), but "is prior to all existents". Plotinus identified his "One" with the concept of 'Good' and the principle of 'Beauty'. (I.6.9)

His "One" concept encompassed thinker and object. Even the self-contemplating intelligence (the noesis of the nous) must contain duality. "Once you have uttered 'The Good,' add no further thought: by any addition, and in proportion to that addition, you introduce a deficiency." (III.8.11) Plotinus denies sentience, self-awareness or any other action (ergon) to the One (V.6.6). Rather, if we insist on describing it further, we must call the One a sheer potentiality (dynamis) without which nothing could exist. (III.8.10) As Plotinus explains in both places and elsewhere (e.g. V.6.3), it is impossible for the One to be Being or a self-aware Creator God. At (V.6.4), Plotinus compared the One to "light", the Divine Intellect/Nous (Νοῦς, Nous; first will towards Good) to the "Sun", and lastly the Soul (Ψυχή, Psyche) to the "Moon" whose light is merely a "derivative conglomeration of light from the 'Sun'". The first light could exist without any celestial body.

The One, being beyond all attributes including being and non-being, is the source of the world—but not through any act of creation, since activity cannot be ascribed to the unchangeable, immutable One. Plotinus argues instead that the multiple cannot exist without the simple. The "less perfect" must, of necessity, "emanate", or issue forth, from the "perfect" or "more perfect". Thus, all of "creation" emanates from the One in succeeding stages of lesser and lesser perfection. These stages are not temporally isolated, but occur throughout time as a constant process.

The One is not just an intellectual concept but something that can be experienced, an experience where one goes beyond all multiplicity. Plotinus writes, "We ought not even to say that he will see, but he will be that which he sees, if indeed it is possible any longer to distinguish between seer and seen, and not boldly to affirm that the two are one."

=== Emanation by the One ===
Although Plotinus never mentions Christianity in any of his works, he seems to offer an alternative to the orthodox Christian notion of creation ex nihilo (out of nothing), though this is disputed. The metaphysics of emanation (ἀπορροή aporrhoe (ΙΙ.3.2) or ἀπόρροια aporrhoia (II.3.11)) (literally a flowing, ροη, out, απο), similar to the metaphysics of Creation, describes the absolute transcendence of the One or of the Divine, as the source of the Being of all things, but which remains transcendent of them in its own nature. The One is in no way affected or diminished by these emanations, just as the Christian God in no way is augmented or diminished by the act of Creation. Plotinus, using a venerable analogy that would become crucial for the (largely neoplatonic) metaphysics of developed Christian thought, likens the One to the Sun which emanates light indiscriminately without thereby diminishing itself, or reflection in a mirror which in no way diminishes or otherwise alters the object being reflected.

The first emanation is Nous (Divine Mind, Logos, Order, Thought, Reason), identified metaphorically with the Demiurge in Plato's Timaeus. It is the first Will toward Good. From Nous proceeds the World Soul, which Plotinus subdivides into upper and lower, identifying the lower aspect of Soul with nature. From the world soul proceed individual human souls, and finally, matter, at the lowest level of being and thus the least perfected level of the cosmos. Plotinus asserted the ultimately divine nature of material creation since it ultimately derives from the One, through the mediums of Nous and the world soul. It is by the Good or through beauty that we recognize the One, in material things and then in the Forms. (I.6.6 and I.6.9)

The essentially devotional nature of Plotinus' philosophy may be further illustrated by his concept of attaining ecstatic union with the One (henosis). Porphyry relates that Plotinus attained such a union four times during the years he knew him. This may be related to enlightenment, liberation, and other concepts of mysticism common to many Eastern traditions.

=== The true human and happiness ===
The philosophy of Plotinus has always exerted a peculiar fascination upon those whose discontent with things as they are has led them to seek the realities behind what they took to be merely the appearances of the sense.

— The philosophy of Plotinus: representative books from the Enneads, p. vii

Authentic human happiness for Plotinus consists of the true human identifying with that which is the best in the universe. Because happiness is beyond anything physical, Plotinus stresses the point that worldly fortune does not control true human happiness, and thus “… there exists no single human being that does not either potentially or effectively possess this thing we hold to constitute happiness.” (Enneads I.4.4) The issue of happiness is one of Plotinus’ greatest imprints on Western thought, as he is one of the first to introduce the idea that eudaimonia (happiness) is attainable only within consciousness.

The true human is an incorporeal contemplative capacity of the soul, and superior to all things corporeal. It then follows that real human happiness is independent of the physical world. Real happiness is, instead, dependent on the metaphysical and authentic human being found in this highest capacity of Reason. “For man, and especially the Proficient, is not the Couplement of Soul and body: the proof is that man can be disengaged from the body and disdain its nominal goods.” (Enneads I.4.14) The human who has achieved happiness will not be bothered by sickness, discomfort, etc., as his focus is on the greatest things. Authentic human happiness is the utilization of the most authentically human capacity of contemplation. Even in daily, physical action, the flourishing human’s “… Act is determined by the higher phase of the Soul.” (Enneads III.4.6) Even in the most dramatic arguments Plotinus considers (if the Proficient is subject to extreme physical torture, for example), he concludes this only strengthens his claim of true happiness being metaphysical, as the truly happy human being would understand that which is being tortured is merely a body, not the conscious self, and happiness could persist.

Plotinus offers a comprehensive description of an individual who has achieved eudaimonia. “The perfect life” involves a man who commands reason and contemplation. (Enneads I.4.4) A happy person will not sway between happy and sad, as many of Plotinus' contemporaries believed. Stoics, for example, question the ability of someone to be happy (presupposing happiness is contemplation) if they are mentally incapacitated or even asleep. Plotinus disregards this claim, as the soul and true human do not sleep or even exist in time, nor will a living human who has achieved eudaimonia suddenly stop using its greatest, most authentic capacity just because of the body’s discomfort in the physical realm. “… The Proficient’s will is set always and only inward.” (Enneads I.4.11)

Overall, happiness for Plotinus is "... a flight from this world's ways and things." (Theaet. 176) and a focus on the highest, i.e. Forms and the One.

Plotinus regarded happiness as living in an interior way (interiority or self-sufficiency), and this being the obverse of attachment to the objects of embodied desires.

=== Henosis ===
Henosis is the word for mystical "oneness", "union", or "unity" in classical Greek. In Platonism, and especially neoplatonism, the goal of henosis is union with what is fundamental in reality: the One (τὸ Ἕν), the Source, or Monad.

As is specified in the writings of Plotinus on henology, one can reach a state of tabula rasa, blank state where the individual may grasp or merge with The One. (Note: Plotinus: * "Our thought cannot grasp the One as long as any other image remains active in the soul. To this end, you must set free your soul from all outward things and turn wholly within yourself, with no more leaning to what lies outside, and lay your mind bare of ideal forms, as before of the objects of sense, and forget even yourself, and so come within sight of that One. (6.9.7) * "If he remembers who he became when he merged with the One, he will bear its image in himself. He was himself one, with no diversity in himself or his outward relations; for no movement was in him, no passion, no desire for another, once the ascent was accomplished. Nor indeed was there any reason or though, nor, if we dare say it, any trace of himself." (6.9.11)) This absolute simplicity means that the nous or the person is then dissolved, completely absorbed back into the Monad. Here within the Enneads of Plotinus the Monad can be referred to as the Good above the demiurge. The Monad or dunamis (force) is of one singular expression (the will or the one which is the good); all is contained in the Monad and the Monad is all (pantheism). All division is reconciled in the one; the final stage before reaching singularity, called duality (dyad), is completely reconciled in the Monad, Source or One (see monism). As the one source or substance of all things, the Monad is all encompassing. As infinite and indeterminate all is reconciled in the dunamis or one. It is the demiurge or second emanation that is the nous in Plotinus. It is the demiurge (creator, action, energy) or nous that "perceives" and therefore causes the force (potential or One) to manifest as energy, or the dyad called the material world. Nous as being; being and perception (intellect) manifest what is called soul (World Soul).

Henosis for Plotinus was defined in his works as a reversing of the ontological process of consciousness via meditation (in the Western mind to uncontemplate) toward no thought (Nous or demiurge) and no division (dyad) within the individual (being). Plotinus words his teachings to reconcile not only Plato with Aristotle but also various World religions that he had personal contact with during his various travels. Plotinus' works have an ascetic character in that they reject matter as an illusion (non-existent). Matter was strictly treated as immanent, with matter as essential to its being, having no true or transcendential character or essence, substance or ousia (οὐσία). This approach is called philosophical Idealism.

=== Relation with contemporary philosophy and religion ===
==== Plotinus's Relation to Plato ====
For several centuries after the Protestant Reformation, neoplatonism was condemned as a decadent and 'oriental' distortion of Platonism. In a 1929 essay, E. R. Dodds showed that key conceptions of neoplatonism could be traced from their origin in Plato's dialogues, through his immediate followers (e.g., Speusippus) and the neopythagoreans, to Plotinus and the neoplatonists. Thus Plotinus' philosophy was, he argued, 'not the starting-point of neoplatonism but its intellectual culmination.' Further research reinforced this view and by 1954 Merlan could say 'The present tendency is toward bridging rather than widening the gap separating Platonism from neoplatonism.'

Since the 1950s, the Tübingen School of Plato interpretation has argued that the so-called 'unwritten doctrines' of Plato debated by Aristotle and the Old Academy strongly resemble Plotinus's metaphysics. In this case, the neoplatonic reading of Plato would be, at least in this central area, historically justified. This implies that neoplatonism is less of an innovation than it appears without the recognition of Plato's unwritten doctrines. Advocates of the Tübingen School emphasize this advantage of their interpretation. They see Plotinus as advancing a tradition of thought begun by Plato himself. Plotinus's metaphysics, at least in broad outline, was therefore already familiar to the first generation of Plato's students. This confirms Plotinus' own view, for he considered himself not the inventor of a system but the faithful interpreter of Plato's doctrines.

==== Plotinus and the Gnostics ====
At least two modern conferences within Hellenic philosophy fields of study have been held in order to address what Plotinus stated in his tract Against the Gnostics and to whom he was addressing it, in order to separate and clarify the events and persons involved in the origin of the term "Gnostic". From the dialogue, it appears that the word had an origin in the Platonic and Hellenistic tradition long before the group calling themselves "Gnostics"—or the group covered under the modern term "Gnosticism"—ever appeared. It would seem that this shift from Platonic to Gnostic usage has led many people to confusion. The strategy of sectarians taking Greek terms from philosophical contexts and re-applying them to religious contexts was popular in Christianity, the Cult of Isis and other ancient religious contexts including Hermetic ones (see Alexander of Abonutichus for an example).

According to A. H. Armstrong, Plotinus and the neoplatonists viewed Gnosticism as a form of heresy or sectarianism to the Pythagorean and Platonic philosophy of the Mediterranean and Middle East. (Note: From Introduction to Against the Gnostics in Plotinus' Enneads as translated by A. H. Armstrong, pp. 220–222: The treatise as it stands in the Enneads is a most powerful protest on behalf of Hellenic philosophy against the un-Hellenic heresy (as it was from the Platonist as well as the orthodox Christian point of view) of Gnosticism. There were Gnostics among Plotinus's own friends, whom he had not succeeded in converting (Enneads ch.10 of this treatise) and he and his pupils devoted considerable time and energy to anti-Gnostic controversy (Life of Plotinus ch.16). He obviously considered Gnosticism an extremely dangerous influence, likely to pervert the minds even of members of his own circle. It is impossible to attempt to give an account of Gnosticism here. By far the best discussion of what the particular group of Gnostics Plotinus knew believed is M. Puech's admirable contribution to Entretiens Hardt V (Les Sources de Plotin). But it is important for the understanding of this treatise to be clear about the reasons why Plotinus disliked them so intensely and thought their influence so harmful.) Also according to Armstrong, Plotinus accused them of using senseless jargon and being overly dramatic and insolent in their distortion of Plato's ontology." (Note: From Introduction to Against the Gnostics in Plotinus' Enneads as translated by A. H. Armstrong, pp. 220–222: Short statement of the doctrine of the three hypostasis, the One, Intellect and Soul; there cannot be more or fewer than these three.: 1. Criticism of the attempts to multiply the hypostasis, and especially of the idea of two intellects, one which thinks and that other which thinks that it thinks. (Against the Gnostics, Enneads ch. 1). The true doctrine of Soul (ch. 2).; 2. The law of necessary procession and the eternity of the universe (ch. 3).; – Attack on the Gnostic doctrine of the making of the universe by a fallen soul, and on their despising of the universe and the heavenly bodies (chs. 4–5). – The sense-less jargon of the Gnostics, their plagiarism from and perversion of Plato, and their insolent arrogance (ch. 6).: 3. The true doctrine about Universal Soul and the goodness of the universe which it forms and rules (chs. 7–8).; 4. Refutation of objections from the inequalities and injustices of human life (ch. 9).; 5. Ridiculous arrogance of the Gnostics who refuse to acknowledge the hierarchy of created gods and spirits and say that they alone are sons of God and superior to the heavens (ch. 9).; 6. The absurdities of the Gnostic doctrine of the fall of "Wisdom" (Sophia) and of the generation and activities of the Demiurge, maker of the visible universe (chs. 10–12).; 7. False and melodramatic Gnostic teaching about the cosmic spheres and their influence (ch. 13).; 8. The blasphemous falsity of the Gnostic claim to control the higher powers by magic and the absurdity of their claim to cure diseases by casting out demons (ch. 14).; 9. The false other-worldliness of the Gnostics leads to immorality (ch. 15).; 10. The true Platonic other-worldliness, which loves and venerates the material universe in all its goodness and beauty as the most perfect possible image of the intelligible, contracted at length with the false, Gnostic, other-worldliness which hates and despises the material universe and its beauties (chs. 16–18).; A. H. Armstrong, Introduction to Against the Gnostics in Plotinus' Enneads, pages 220–222) Armstrong argues that Plotinus attacks his opponents as untraditional, irrational and immoral (Note: From Introduction to Against the Gnostics in Plotinus' Enneads as translated by A. H. Armstrong, pp. 220–222: The teaching of the Gnostics seems to him untraditional, irrational and immoral. They despise and revile the ancient Platonic teaching and claim to have a new and superior wisdom of their own: but in fact anything that is true in their teaching comes from Plato, and all they have done themselves is to add senseless complications and pervert the true traditional doctrine into a melodramatic, superstitious fantasy designed to feed their own delusions of grandeur. They reject the only true way of salvation through wisdom and virtue, the slow patient study of truth and pursuit of perfection by men who respect the wisdom of the ancients and that know their place in the universe. Pages 220–222) (Note: Introduction to Against the Gnostics in Plotinus' Enneads as translated by A. H. Armstrong, pp. 220–222: 9. The false other-worldliness of the Gnostics leads to immorality (Enneads ch. 15).) and arrogant. (Note: Introduction to Against the Gnostics in Plotinus' Enneads as translated by A. H. Armstrong, pp. 220–222: Ridiculous arrogance of the Gnostics who refuse to acknowledge the hierarchy of created gods and spirits and say that they alone are sons of God and superior to the heavens (Enneads ch. 9)) Armstrong believed that Plotinus also attacks them as elitist and blasphemous to Plato for the Gnostics despising the material world and its maker. (Note: They claim to be a privileged caste of beings, in whom alone God is interested, and who are saved not by their own efforts but by some dramatic and arbitrary divine proceeding; and this, Plotinus says, leads to immorality. Worst of all, they despise and hate the material universe and deny its goodness and the goodness of its maker. This for a Platonist is utter blasphemy, and all the worse because it obviously derives to some extent from the sharply other-worldly side of Plato's own teaching (e.g. in the Phaedo). At this point in his attack Plotinus comes very close in some ways to the orthodox Christian opponents of Gnosticism, who also insist that this world is the good work of God in his goodness. But, here as on the question of salvation, the doctrine which Plotinus is defending is as sharply opposed on other ways to orthodox Christianity as to Gnosticism: for he maintains not only the goodness of the material universe but also its eternity and its divinity. The idea that the universe could have a beginning and end is inseparably connected in his mind with the idea that the divine action in making it is arbitrary and irrational. And to deny the divinity (though a subordinate and dependent divinity) of the World-Soul, and of those noblest of embodied living beings the heavenly bodies, seems to him both blasphemous and unreasonable. Pages 220–222)

For decades, Armstrong's was the only translation available of Plotinus. For this reason, his claims were authoritative. However, a modern translation by Lloyd P. Gerson doesn't necessarily support all of Armstrong's views. Unlike Armstrong, Gerson didn't find Plotinus to be so vitriolic against the Gnostics. According to Gerson:

As Plotinus himself tells us, at the time of this treatise’s composition some of his friends were ‘attached’ to Gnostic doctrine, and he believed that this attachment was harmful. So he sets out here a number of objections and corrections. Some of these are directed at very specific tenets of Gnosticism, e.g. the introduction of a ‘new earth’ or a principle of ‘Wisdom’, but the general thrust of this treatise has a much broader scope. The Gnostics are very critical of the sensible universe and its contents, and as a Platonist, Plotinus must share this critical attitude to some extent. But here he makes his case that the proper understanding of the highest principles and emanation forces us to respect the sensible world as the best possible imitation of the intelligible world.

Plotinus seems to direct his attacks at a very specific sect of Gnostics, most notably a sect of Gnostics that held anti-polytheistic and anti-daemon views, and that preached salvation was possible without struggle. At one point, Plotinus makes clear that his major grudge is the way Gnostics 'misused' Plato's teachings, and not their own teachings themselves:

There are no hard feelings if they tell us in which respects they intend to disagree with Plato [...] Rather, whatever strikes them as their own distinct views in comparison with the Greeks’, these views – as well as the views that contradict them – should be forthrightly set out on their own in a considerate and philosophical manner.

The neoplatonic movement (though Plotinus would have simply referred to himself as a philosopher of Plato) seems to be motivated by the desire of Plotinus to revive the pagan philosophical tradition. (Note: "... as Plotinus had endeavored to revive the religious spirit of paganism".) Plotinus was not claiming to innovate with the Enneads, but to clarify aspects of the works of Plato that he considered misrepresented or misunderstood. Plotinus does not claim to be an innovator, but rather a communicator of a tradition. Plotinus referred to tradition as a way to interpret Plato's intentions. Because the teachings of Plato were for members of the academy rather than the general public, it was easy for outsiders to misunderstand Plato's meaning. However, Plotinus attempted to clarify how the philosophers of the academy had not arrived at the same conclusions (such as misotheism or dystheism of the creator God as an answer to the problem of evil) as the targets of his criticism.

==== Against causal astrology ====
Plotinus seems to be one of the first to have argued against the then popular notion of causal astrology. In the late tractate 2.3, "Are the stars causes?", Plotinus makes the argument that specific stars influencing one's fortune (a common Hellenistic theme) attributes irrationality to a perfect universe, and invites moral depravity. He does, however, claim the stars and planets are ensouled, as witnessed by their movement.

== Legacy ==
=== Ancient world ===
The emperor Julian the Apostate was deeply influenced by Neoplatonism, as was Hypatia of Alexandria. Neoplatonism influenced many Christians as well, including Pseudo-Dionysius the Areopagite. St. Augustine, though often referred to as a "Platonist", acquired his Platonist philosophy through the mediation of the Neoplatonist teachings of Plotinus.

=== Christianity ===
Plotinus' philosophy had an influence on the development of Christian theology. In A History of Western Philosophy, philosopher Bertrand Russell wrote that:

To the Christian, the Other World was the Kingdom of Heaven, to be enjoyed after death; to the Platonist, it was the eternal world of ideas, the real world as opposed to that of illusory appearance. Christian theologians combined these points of view, and embodied much of the philosophy of Plotinus. [...] Plotinus, accordingly, is historically important as an influence in moulding the Christianity of the Middle Ages and of theology.

The Eastern Orthodox position on energy, for example, is often contrasted with the position of the Roman Catholic Church, and in part this is attributed to varying usages of Aristotelian and Plotinian concepts, either through Thomas Aquinas for the Roman Catholics or Gregory Palamas for the Orthodox Christians.

=== Islam ===
Neoplatonism and the ideas of Plotinus influenced medieval Islam as well, since the Mutazilite Abbasids fused Greek concepts into sponsored state texts, and found great influence amongst the Ismaili Shia and Persian philosophers as well, such as Muhammad al-Nasafi and Abu Yaqub Sijistani. By the 11th century, neoplatonism was adopted by the Fatimid state of Egypt, and taught by their da'i. Neoplatonism was brought to the Fatimid court by Hamid al-Din al-Kirmani, although his teachings differed from Nasafi and Sijistani, who were more aligned with the original teachings of Plotinus. The teachings of Kirmani in turn influenced philosophers such as Nasir Khusraw of Persia.

=== Judaism ===
As with Islam and Christianity, neoplatonism in general and Plotinus in particular influenced speculative thought. Notable thinkers expressing neoplatonist themes are Solomon ibn Gabirol (Latin: Avicebron) and Moses ben Maimon (Latin: Maimonides). As with Islam and Christianity, apophatic theology and the privative nature of evil are two prominent themes that such thinkers picked up from either Plotinus or his successors.

=== Renaissance ===
In the Renaissance the philosopher Marsilio Ficino set up an Academy under the patronage of Cosimo de Medici in Florence, mirroring that of Plato. His work was of great importance in reconciling the philosophy of Plato directly with Christianity. One of his most distinguished pupils was Pico della Mirandola, author of An Oration on the Dignity of Man.

=== England ===
In England, Plotinus was the cardinal influence on the 17th-century school of the Cambridge Platonists, and on numerous writers from Samuel Taylor Coleridge to W. B. Yeats and Kathleen Raine.

=== India ===
Sarvepalli Radhakrishnan and Ananda Coomaraswamy used the writing of Plotinus in their own texts as a superlative elaboration upon Indian monism, specifically Upanishadic and Advaita Vedantic thought. Coomaraswamy has compared Plotinus' teachings to the Hindu school of Advaita Vedanta (advaita meaning "not two" or "non-dual"). M. Vasudevacharya says, "Though Plotinus never managed to reach India, his method shows an affinity to the 'method of negation' as taught in some of the Upanishads, such as the Brhadaranyaka Upanishad, and also to the practice of yoga."

Advaita Vedanta and neoplatonism have been compared by J. F. Staal, Frederick Copleston, Aldo Magris and Mario Piantelli, Radhakrishnan, Gwen Griffith-Dickson, and John Y. Fenton.

The joint influence of Advaitin and Neoplatonic ideas on Ralph Waldo Emerson was considered by Dale Riepe in 1967.

== See also ==
- Allegorical interpretations of Plato
- Antiochus of Ascalon
- Disciples of Plotinus
- Ecstasy in philosophy
- Emanationism
- Form of the Good
- The One in Neoplatonism
- Pantaenus
- Platonic Academy
- Plato's unwritten doctrines
- Plutarch of Chaeronea
- The Theology of Aristotle
- Thomas Taylor

== Film studies ==
Plotinian concepts have been discussed in a cinematic context and relate Plotinus' theory of time as a transitory intelligible movement of the soul to Bergson’s and Deleuze’s time-image.

== Works ==
Critical editions of the Greek text

- Émile Bréhier, Plotin: Ennéades (with French translation), Collection Budé, 1924–1938.
- Paul Henry and Hans-Rudolf Schwyzer (eds.), Editio maior (3 volumes), Paris, Desclée de Brouwer, 1951–1973.
- Paul Henry and Hans-Rudolf Schwyzer (eds.), Editio minor, Oxford, Oxford Classical Text, 1964–1982.

Complete English translations

- Thomas Taylor, Collected Writings of Plotinus, Frome, Prometheus Trust, 1994. ISBN 1-898910-02-2 (contains approximately half of the Enneads)
- Plotinus. The Enneads (translated by Stephen MacKenna), London, Medici Society, 1917–1930 (an online version is available at Sacred Texts); 2nd edition, B. S. Page (ed.), 1956.
- A. H. Armstrong, Plotinus. Enneads (with Greek text), Loeb Classical Library, 7 vol., 1966–1988.
- Lloyd P. Gerson (ed.), George Boys-Stones, John M. Dillon, Lloyd P. Gerson, R.A. King, Andrew Smith and James Wilberding (trs.). The Enneads. Cambridge University Press, 2018.

Lexica

- J. H. Sleeman and G. Pollet, Lexicon Plotinianum, Leiden, 1980.
- Roberto Radice (ed.), Lexicon II: Plotinus, Milan, Biblia, 2004. (Electronic edition by Roberto Bombacigno)

The Life of Plotinus by Porphyry

- Porphyry, "On the Life of Plotinus and the Arrangement of his Works" in Mark Edwards (ed.), Neoplatonic Saints: The Lives of Plotinus and Proclus by their Students, Liverpool, Liverpool University Press, 2000.

Anthologies of texts in translation, with annotations

- Kevin Corrigan, Reading Plotinus: A Practical Introduction to Neoplatonism, West Lafayette, Purdue University Press, 2005.
- John M. Dillon and Lloyd P. Gerson, Neoplatonic Philosophy: Introductory Readings, Hackett, 2004.
- Long, Anthony A., ed. (2022). Ennead II.4: On matter. Las Vegas: Parmenides Publishing. ISBN 9781733535762.

Introductory works

- Erik Emilsson, Plotinus, New York: Routledge, 2017.
- Kevin Corrigan, Reading Plotinus. A Practical Introduction to Neoplatonism, Purdue University Press, 1995.
- Lloyd P. Gerson, Plotinus, New York, Routledge, 1994.
- Lloyd P. Gerson (ed.), The Cambridge Companion to Plotinus, Cambridge, 1996.
- Dominic J. O'Meara, Plotinus. An Introduction to the Enneads, Oxford, Clarendon Press, 1993. (Reprinted 2005)
- John M. Rist, Plotinus. The Road to Reality, Cambridge, Cambridge University Press, 1967.

Major commentaries in English

- Cinzia Arruzza, Plotinus: Ennead II.5, On What Is Potentially and What Actually, The Enneads of Plotinus Series edited by John M. Dillon and Andrew Smith, Parmenides Publishing, 2015, ISBN 978-1-930972-63-6
- Michael Atkinson, Plotinus: Ennead V.1, On the Three Principal Hypostases, Oxford, 1983.
- Kevin Corrigan, Plotinus' Theory of Matter-Evil: Plato, Aristotle, and Alexander of Aphrodisias (II.4, II.5, III.6, I.8), Leiden, 1996.
- John N. Deck, Nature, Contemplation and the One: A Study in the Philosophy of Plotinus, University of Toronto Press, 1967; Paul Brunton Philosophical Foundation, 1991.
- John M. Dillon, H.J. Blumenthal, Plotinus: Ennead IV.3–4.29, "Problems Concerning the Soul", The Enneads of Plotinus Series edited by John M. Dillon and Andrew Smith, Parmenides Publishing, 2015, ISBN 978-1-930972-89-6
- Eyjólfur K. Emilsson, Steven K. Strange, Plotinus: Ennead VI.4 & VI.5: On the Presence of Being, One and the Same, Everywhere as a Whole, The Enneads of Plotinus Series edited by John M. Dillon and Andrew Smith, Parmenides Publishing, 2015, ISBN 978-1-930972-34-6
- Barrie Fleet, Plotinus: Ennead III.6, On the Impassivity of the Bodiless, Oxford, 1995.
- Barrie Fleet, Plotinus: Ennead IV.8, On the Descent of the Soul into Bodies, The Enneads of Plotinus Series edited by John M. Dillon and Andrew Smith, Parmenides Publishing, 2012. ISBN 978-1-930972-77-3
- Lloyd P. Gerson, Plotinus: Ennead V.5, That the Intelligibles are not External to the Intellect, and on the Good, The Enneads of Plotinus Series edited by John M. Dillon and Andrew Smith, Parmenides Publishing, 2013, ISBN 978-1-930972-85-8
- Sebastian R. P. Gertz, Plotinus: Ennead II.9, Against the Gnostics, The Enneads of Plotinus Series edited by John M. Dillon and Andrew Smith, Parmenides Publishing, 2017, ISBN 978-1-930972-37-7
- Gary M. Gurtler, SJ, Plotinus: Ennead IV.4.30–45 & IV.5, "Problems Concerning the Soul", The Enneads of Plotinus Series edited by John M. Dillon and Andrew Smith, Parmenides Publishing, 2015, ISBN 978-1-930972-69-8
- W. Helleman-Elgersma, Soul-Sisters. A Commentary on Enneads IV, 3 (27), 1–8 of Plotinus, Amsterdam, 1980.
- James Luchte, Early Greek Thought: Before the Dawn. London: Bloomsbury Publishing, 2011. ISBN 978-0567353313.
- Kieran McGroarty, Plotinus on Eudaimonia: A Commentary on Ennead I.4, Oxford, 2006.
- P. A. Meijer, Plotinus on the Good or the One (VI.9), Amsterdam, 1992.
- H. Oosthout, Modes of Knowledge and the Transcendental: An Introduction to Plotinus Ennead V.3, Amsterdam, 1991.
- J. Wilberding, Plotinus' Cosmology. A study of Ennead II. 1 (40), Oxford, 2006.
- A. M. Wolters, Plotinus on Eros: A Detailed Exegetical Study of Enneads III, 5, Amsterdam, 1972.

General works on Neoplatonism

- Robert M. Berchman, From Philo to Origen: Middle Platonism in Transition, Chico, Scholars Press, 1984.
- Frederick Copleston, A History of Philosophy: Vol. 1, Part 2. ISBN 0-385-00210-6
- Hartmann, Udo (2018). Der spätantike Philosoph. Die Lebenswelten der paganen Gelehrten und ihre hagiographische Ausgestaltung in den Philosophenviten von Porphyrios bis Damaskios (in German). 3 volumes. Bonn: Habelt, ISBN 978-3-7749-4172-4
- P. Merlan, "Greek Philosophy from Plato to Plotinus" in A. H. Armstrong (ed.), The Cambridge History of Later Greek and Early Medieval Philosophy, Cambridge, 1967. ISBN 0-521-04054-X
- Pauliina Remes, Neoplatonism (Ancient Philosophies), University of California Press, 2008.
- Thomas Taylor, The fragments that remain of the lost writings of Proclus, surnamed the Platonic successor, London, 1825. (Selene Books reprint edition, 1987. ISBN 0-933601-11-5)
- Richard T. Wallis, Neoplatonism and Gnosticism, University of Oklahoma, 1984. ISBN 0-7914-1337-3 and ISBN 0-7914-1338-1

Studies on some aspects of Plotinus' work

- R. B. Harris (ed.), Neoplatonism and Indian Thought, Albany, 1982.
- Girard, Charles (2023). L'homme sans dualité: la question du sujet le " nous " chez Plotin. Paris: Librairie Philosophique J. Vrin. ISBN 9782711630684.
- Giannis Stamatellos, Plotinus and the Presocratics. A Philosophical Study of Presocratic Influences in Plotinus' Enneads, Albany, 2008.
- N. Joseph Torchia, Plotinus, Tolma, and the Descent of Being, New York, Peter Lang, 1993. ISBN 0-8204-1768-8
- Antonia Tripolitis, The Doctrine of the Soul in the thought of Plotinus and Origen, Libra Publishers, 1978.
- M. F. Wagner (ed.), Neoplatonism and Nature. Studies in Plotinus' Enneads, Albany, 2002.
