= Il compagno di viaggio =

1956/2007 novella by Curzio Malaparte

- Author: Curzio Malaparte
- Language: Italian
- Publisher: Excelsior 1881
- Publication date: November 2007
- Publication place: Italy
- Pages: 98
- ISBN: 9788861580244

Il compagno di viaggio (lit. 'The Travel Companion') is an unfinished novella by the Italian writer Curzio Malaparte. Set in September 1943, as Italy is defeated by the Allied invasion in World War II, it follows the private Italian soldier Calusia who tries to bring his lieutenant's dead body from Calabria to Naples, witnessing disorder, horror and migrations along the way. Malaparte wrote the story in 1956 but left it unfinished. It remained unpublished until 2007, when Excelsior 1881 published it to commemorate that 50 years had passed since Malaparte's death.

Télérama described Il compagno di viaggio as "dense and pure like a rock", and as simultaneously a "near realistic" portrayal of Italy in 1943 and an allegory about Malaparte's complex relationship with the country. Robert Lévesque of La Presse described it as more restrained than Malaparte's "furious" novels Kaputt and The Skin. Clara Dupont-Monod of Marianne called the novella a "stunning marvel" where Malaparte suggests the real enemy of the Italians is the Italians themselves.

Malaparte sent the unpublished manuscript to a film producer, hoping it would be adapted for cinema, but this came to nothing. The novella was adapted into the French comic book Il ne devra plus y avoir d'orphelins sur cette terre, written by Aurélien Ducoudray, illustrated by Thomas Azuélos and published by Futuropolis in 2024.
