= The Kremlin Ball =

Unifinished novel by Curzio Malaparte

- Adelphi edition (2012)
- Author: Curzio Malaparte
- Original title: Il ballo al Kremlino
- Translator: Jenny McPhee
- Language: Italian
- Publisher: Vallecchi
- Publication date: 1971
- Publication place: Italy
- English publication date: 10 April 2018

The Kremlin Ball (Italian: Il ballo al Kremlino) is an unfinished novel by the Italian writer Curzio Malaparte, published posthumously in 1971.

== Plot ==
Inspired by Malaparte's visit to Moscow in 1929, the novel consists of scenes and interactions with high-level Communist Party officials. The novel's protagonist describes and analyses this "communist nobility" as a continuation of the decadent ruling elite it replaced, only more vulgar. He also interacts with leading Russian writers of the time, including Mikhail Bulgakov and Vladimir Mayakovsky.

== Publication ==
The novel was left unfinished, but the material was published posthumously in 1971 in the last volume of Vallecchi's edition of Malaparte's complete works. Adelphi Edizioni published a version edited by Raffaella Rodondi in 2012, and New York Review Books put out an English translation of this version in 2018. It has the subtitle Material for a Novel (Italian: materiale per un romanzo).

== Reception ==
Mario Andrea Rigoni of Corriere della Sera wrote that The Kremlin Ball, if finished, could have been the third part in a triptych about Europe's decadence, after Malaparte's novels Kaputt (1944) and The Skin (1949). Rigoni wrote that the state of the work means it contains repetitions and inconsistencies, but that this does not make Malaparte's writing obscure. He described the book as an unusual combination of literary portrait and anecdote.

Alessandro Gnocchi of Il Giornale wrote that the ideological snobbery and sense of moral superiority Malaparte attributes to the Soviet leaders make them reminiscent of later radical chic trends, and that "Malaparte's pen, extremely attentive to detail, is ruthless".

Publishers Weekly called the book "strange, aimless, and impassioned" in its descriptions and "halfway successful" in its ambition to portray the vanity and tragedy of the Soviet Union before the Great Purge.
