= Liliana Cavani =

Italian film director and screenwriter (born 1933)

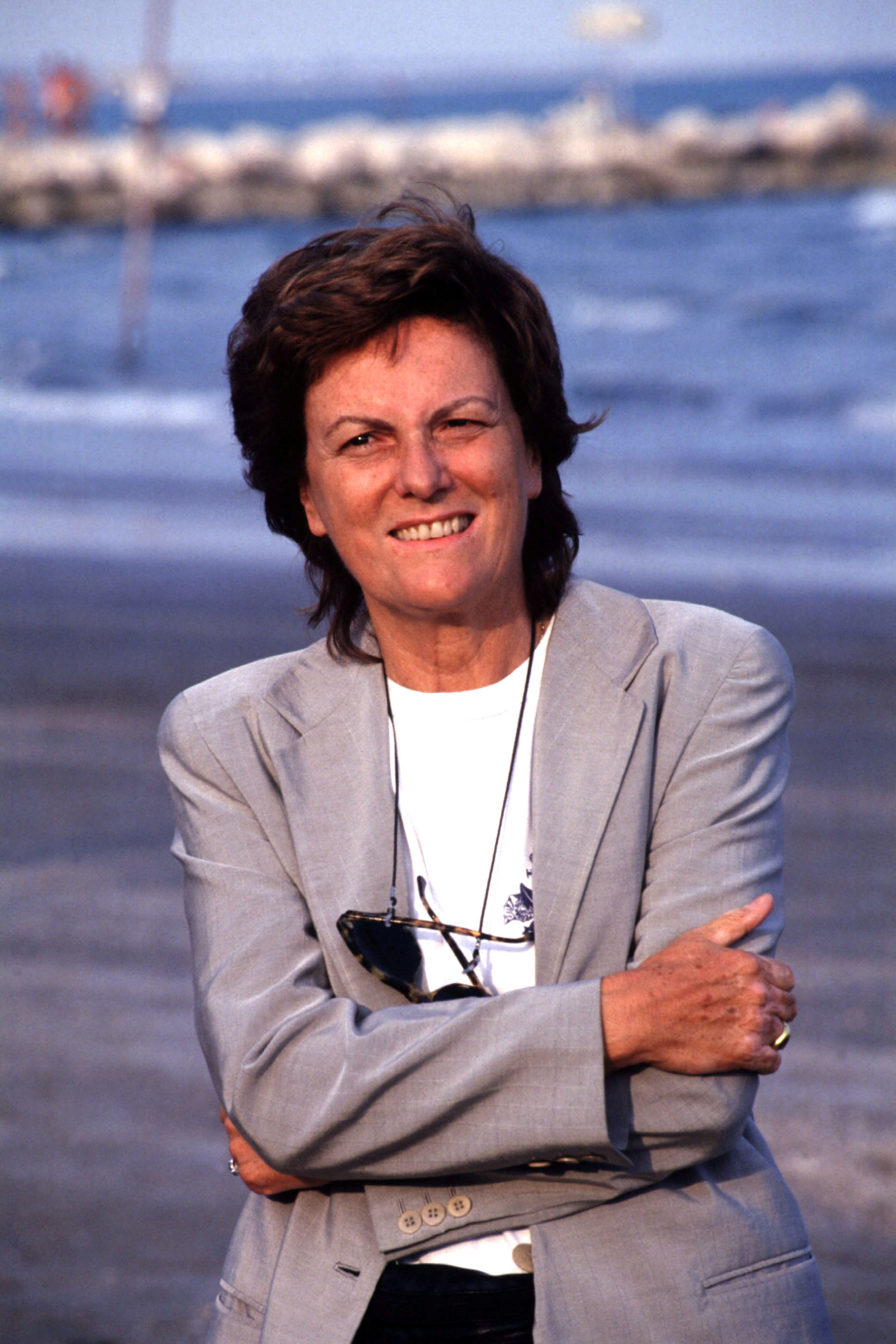
- Cavani in 1993
- Born: 12 January 1933 (age 93); Carpi, Kingdom of Italy
- Education: University of Bologna (1959)
- Occupations: Film director, screenwriter
- Years active: 1961–present

Liliana Cavani (born 12 January 1933) is an Italian film director and screenwriter. Cavani became internationally known after the success of her 1974 feature film Il portiere di notte (The Night Porter). Her films have historical concerns. In addition to feature films and documentaries, she has also directed opera.

== Early life ==
Cavani was born in Carpi, near Modena in the regione of Emilia-Romagna. Cavani's father, an architect from Mantua, belonged to a conservative bourgeois family of landowners. "My father was an architect interested in urban development. He took me to museums. He had worked in urban planning in Baghdad in 1956, when Iraq was still under British control. My mother was very strong, very capable, and very sweet", Cavani explained in an interview. Her mother was passionate about films and took her to the movies every Sunday from an early age. On her mother's side, Cavani came from a working-class family of militant antifascists. Her maternal grandfather, a syndicalist, introduced her to the works of Engels, Marx and Bakunin.

She graduated in literature and philology at Bologna University in 1959, writing a dissertation on the fifteenth-century poet and nobleman Marsilio Pio. She had intended to become an archeologist, a profession she soon abandoned in order to pursue her passion for the moving image. She attended Rome's renowned Centro Sperimentale di Cinematografia. She studied documentary filmmaking and obtained her diploma with the short films Incontro notturno (1961), about the friendship between two men, a white man and a Senegalese, and L'evento (1962) about a group of tourists who killed for fun.

== Film career and later life ==
=== Early films (1961–1965) ===
While attending film school, Cavani won a competition at RAI, Italy's national television network, and took a job there as a director of historical documentaries in 1961. Her professional career thus began making documentaries for RAI between 1961 and 1965, which included Storia del III Reich, (History of the Third Reich) (1962–1963), which chronicles the rise of the Nazi regime.

It was the first historical investigation of German totalitarianism to appear on television. Other documentaries are: L'età di Stalin ("The Stalin Years"), an investigation into the Soviet leader's years; La donna nella Resistenza (1965); Philippe Pétain, processo a Vichy, winner of the Golden Lion at Venice film festival in 1965 in the documentary section. In this period she also made Il giorno della pace, a four-hour documentary on immigration south-to-north within Italy.

=== Francesco di Assisi (1966) ===
Cavani made her first non-fiction feature film in 1966 with Francesco di Assisi (Francis of Assisi). Made for television and aired in two parts, it drew comparisons to the films of Roberto Rossellini and Pier Paolo Pasolini. Lou Castel portrays Francis of Assisi as a slightly depressed protester and an avid, albeit mad, supporter of armed brotherhood. The film was a critical success, but also received controversially. Called "heretical, blasphemous and offensive for the faith of the Italian people", it caused the first of many polemical reactions to Cavani's work.

=== Galileo (1968) ===
Her next film Galileo focuses on the seventeenth-century conflict between science and religion. Astronomer Galileo Galilei's heliocentric theories collide with the dogmas of the church, resulting in his interrogation by the Inquisition. Originally intended as a miniseries co-produced by Italian and Bulgarian film companies, radio and television company RAI refused to broadcast the finished film and sold the distribution rights to Cineriz.

=== The Year of the Cannibals (1969) ===
The Year of the Cannibals (I Cannibali), Cavani's first film to rely on an independent production company, uses the myth of Antigone to present the contemporary political state of Italy. The film, set in the industrial city of Milan, recounts the struggle of a young woman against the authorities that prevents burying the bodies of rebels killed by the police, to serve as a warning to its citizens. The only rebel in a city crushed by dictatorship, she is aided by a mysterious man who speaks an unknown language. The example of these two is soon followed by others. This work was not very well received by the public, so Cavani returned to television with the series of documentaries I bambini e noi (1970).

=== The Guest (1971) ===
Cavani's subsequent film L’ospite (The Guest) furthered her interest in social and psychological themes. The plot centers on a woman who, after being released from a mental hospital, tries in vain to fit into society and flees into a fantasised past. The film, starring Lucia Bosè, was produced by RAI on a minuscule budget and shown at the Venice Film Festival.

=== Milarepa (1973) ===
The director undertook a venture into Oriental mystical experiences with Milarepa (1973). A story inspired in a classic text of Tibetan literature, Milarepa moves back and forth in time between the story of the title character, a mystic of the eleventh century and a young westerner whose travails are not very different, both being torn between the search for knowledge and a quest for power. The film was praised by Pier Paolo Pasolini who called it a "truly beautiful film".

=== The Night Porter (1974) ===
Cavani was not well known beyond Italy until she made the 1974 film The Night Porter (Il portiere di notte), which remains the film for which she is best remembered. The plot, set in Vienna in 1957, follows an SS camp guard and a former concentration camp survivor engaging in a sadomasochistic relationship after meeting again by a chance encounter. A deeply controversial film, it starred Dirk Bogarde and Charlotte Rampling.

American critic Roger Ebert called it "despicable", and both major New York critics, Pauline Kael (The New Yorker) and Vincent Canby (The New York Times) dismissed it as "junk". The German Filmdienst categorised the film as "political pornography". In later years, The Night Porter was seen as a ground-breaking attempt to probe the unsettling sexual and psychological ambiguities generated by war.

=== Beyond Good and Evil (1977) ===
In 1977 she made Beyond Good and Evil (Al di là del bene e del male), which recounts the intense relationship between German philosophizer Friedrich Nietzsche, his friend author Paul Rée and Russian writer and feminist Lou Andreas-Salomé. They meet in Rome in 1882 and move to Germany in a failed ménage à trois while attempting to live their lives and satisfy their intellectual needs rejecting morality. Nietzsche goes mad from a venereal disease and Paul discovers his repressed homosexuality with tragic consequences. Lou, the most liberated of the three, following the banner of feminism, is the only survivor. The film, starring Dominique Sanda, Erland Josephson and Robert Powell, was entangled in controversy.

In 1979 she began directing operas with Wozzeck in Florence; since then she has produced and directed several operas for many theaters in Europe. Subsequent operas include Iphigénie en Tauride (1984) and Medea (1986) at the Opera of Paris; Cardillac (1991) in Florence; La vestale (1993) at the Teatro alla Scala in Milan; and La cena delle beffe (1995) in Zürich.

=== The Skin (1981) ===
Her 1981 film, La pelle (The Skin), was based on the novel with the same name by Curzio Malaparte. Shown in competition for the Palme d'Or at the Cannes Film Festival, it was aimed at the international market with a star-studded cast, including Marcello Mastroianni, Claudia Cardinale, Carlo Giuffrè and Burt Lancaster. The film is set during the American occupation of Naples in 1944 during World War II.

=== Beyond the Door (1982) ===
The plot of 1982's Beyond the Door (Oltre la porta), set in North Africa, follows a love triangle between Mathew, an American oil ring worker in love with Nina, a young woman entangled in an affair with her stepfather Enrico, an Italian diplomat who is in jail for the death of Nina's mother. The film, starring Marcello Mastroianni, Tom Berenger and Eleonora Giorgi, disappointed audiences and critics.

=== The Berlin Affair (1985) ===
The Berlin Affair (Interno berlinese), made in 1985, was loosely based on the novel Quicksand by Jun'ichirō Tanizaki. Set in Berlin in 1938, on the verge of war, the film tells the story of a German official working for the foreign office and his wife, both of whom are seduced by the young daughter of the Japanese Ambassador to the Third Reich and are dragged into a perverse love triangle.

The film continued Cavani's interest in transgressive relationships. It was the third part of her trilogy of films with a German setting that began with The Night Porter and continued with Beyond Good and Evil.

=== Francesco (1989) ===
With Francesco (1989) Liliana Cavani returned to the life of St Francis of Assisi in a film starring American actor Mickey Rourke as the title character, and English actress Helena Bonham-Carter as Chiara. The film bore little stylistic resemblance to Cavani's earlier efforts.

In the 1990s Cavani became more interested in staging operas, and devoted less time to filmmaking. She returned to her television roots and directed three TV opera production: Verdi's La Traviata (1992), Cavalleria rusticana on Pietro Mascagni (1996) and Puccini's Manon Lescaut (1998).

=== Where Are You? I'm Here (1993) ===
Where Are You? I'm Here (Dove siete? Io sono qui) (1993), recounts the love story of Fausto and Elena two deaf people from different backgrounds. He belongs to a wealthy family who has raised him as if he were not deaf, while she comes from a more humble working-class family and has to struggle to complete her education. Set in contemporary Italy, the film is similar to The Year of the Cannibals and The Guest in its exploration of the themes of silence and isolation. Like many of Cavani's films, it includes the use of dance.

=== Ripley's Game (2002) ===
In 2002, Cavani made Ripley's Game (Il Gioco di Ripley), based on the novel of the same name by Patricia Highsmith, a sequel to The Talented Mr. Ripley. Ripley's Game, was presented out of competition at the Venice Film Festival.

=== The Order of Time (2023) ===
In 2023, Cavani directed The Order of Time. The screenplay was written by Cavani and Paolo Costella in collaboration with physicist Carlo Rovelli. The film is freely inspired by Rovelli's 2017 essay of the same name. The film tells the story of a gathering of old friends at a seaside villa who soon discover that the world might be ending within the space of a few hours. It premiered out of competition at the 80th Venice International Film Festival, where Cavani was presented with the Golden Lion for Lifetime Achievement.

The Order of Time is first feature film in over 20 years by Cavani, who was 89 years old at the time of the film's production.

== Personal life ==
Cavani currently lives in Rome. Carpi, her hometown, has established the Associazione Fondo Liliana Cavani, where her films are preserved and made available for consultation.

== Filmography as director ==
| Year | English title | Original title | Notes |
|---|---|---|---|
| 1966 | Francis of Assisi | Francesco di Assisi | Made for television |
| 1968 | Galileo | Galileo | Made for television |
| 1969 | The Year of the Cannibals | I Cannibali | |
| 1971 | The Guest | L'ospite | |
| 1973 | Milarepa | Milarepa | |
| 1974 | The Night Porter | Il portiere di notte | |
| 1977 | Beyond Good and Evil | Al di là del bene e del male | |
| 1981 | The Skin | La pelle | Based on the novel by Curzio Malaparte |
| 1982 | Beyond the Door | Oltre la porta | |
| 1985 | The Berlin Affair | Interno Berlinese | Based on the novel Quicksand by Jun'ichirō Tanizaki |
| 1989 | Francesco | Francesco | |
| 1993 | Where Are You? I'm Here | Dove siete? Io sono qui | |
| 2002 | Ripley's Game | Il gioco di Ripley | |
| 2005 | De Gasperi, The Man of Hope | De Gasperi, l'uomo della speranza | Made for television |
| 2008 | Einstein | Einstein | Made for television |
| 2012 | Un corpo in vendita | Un corpo in vendita | |
| 2014 | Francesco | Francesco | Made for television |
| 2023 | The Order of Time | L'ordine del tempo | |

== Awards ==
| Year | Award | Category | Notes |
|---|---|---|---|
| 2023 | Venice Film Festival | Golden Lion for Lifetime Achievement | |

== See also ==
- List of female film and television directors
- List of LGBT-related films directed by women
