= Finland–Spain relations =

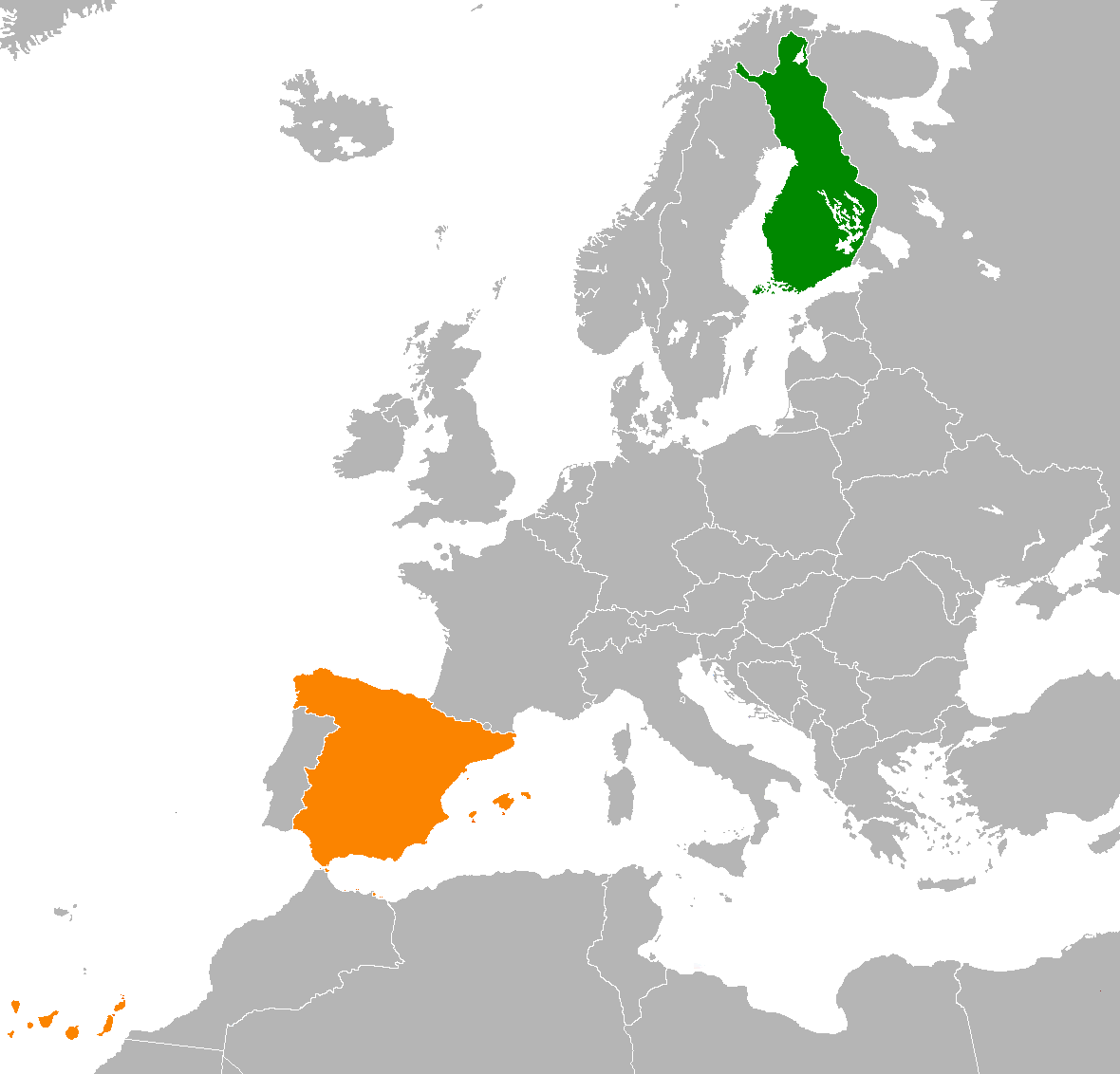
- Finland: Spain

Finland–Spain relations are the bilateral relations between Finland and Spain. Both nations are members of the Council of Europe, the European Union, the United Nations, the Schengen Area, the eurozone, and NATO. Spain supported Finland's NATO membership during Finland's accession into NATO, which was finalized on 4 April 2023. Spain is also one of the favorite destinations of Finnish tourism. Approximately ten percent of the Finnish population travels on vacation each year to Spain. Furthermore, the Finns are the fastest growing European community in Málaga, as Fuengirola is home to the second largest colony of Finns in the world, after Sweden.

== History ==
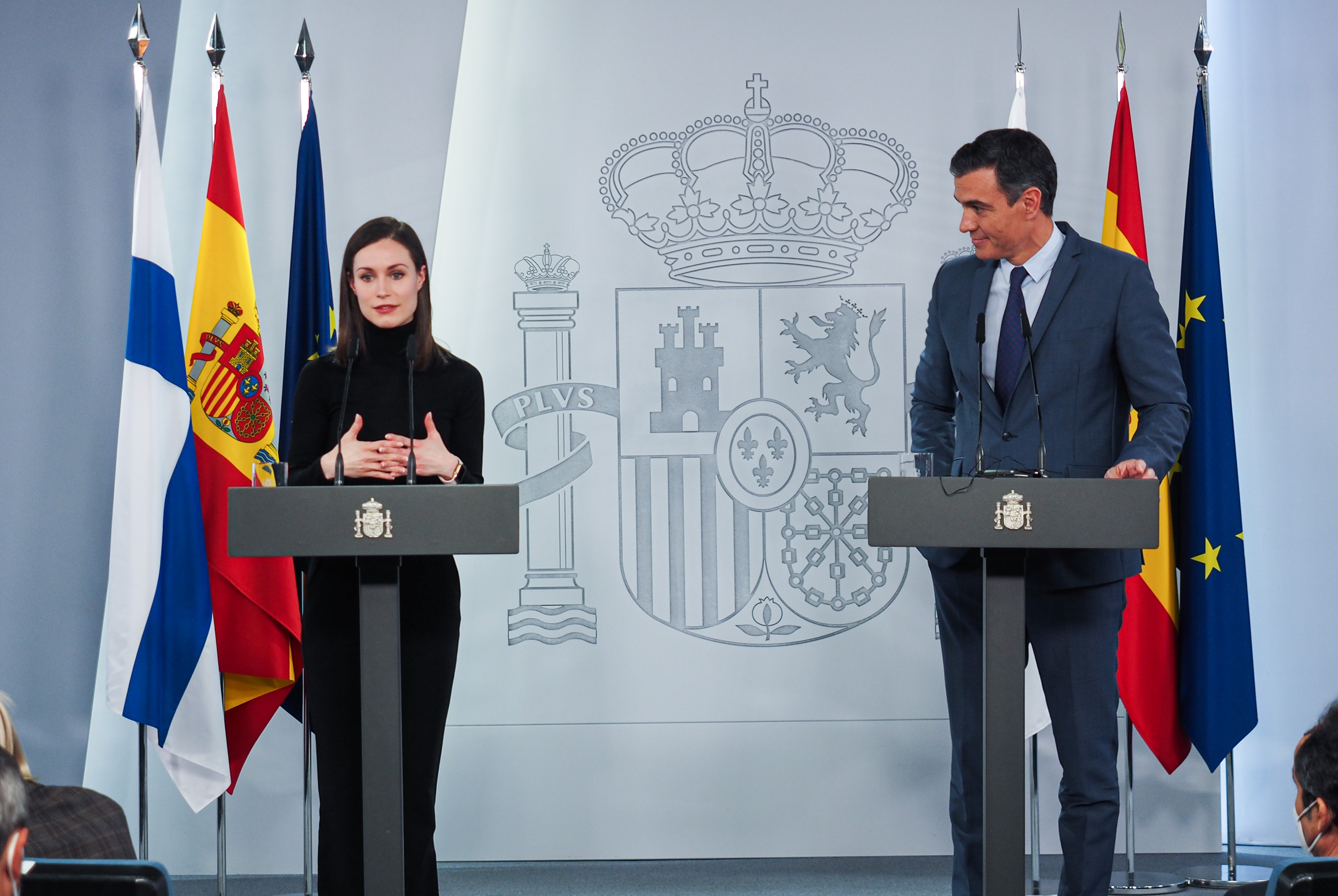
Prime Ministers Sanna Marin and Pedro Sánchez held a press conference at La Moncloa, 2022

Early relations between Finland and Spain took place via-Stockholm as Finland was part of Sweden from 1250 to 1809. Under Swedish rule, Finnish and Spanish troops fought each other during the Thirty Years' War. In 1809, Finland was ceded to the Russian Empire as autonomous Grand Duchy and on 6 December 1917, Finland declared its full independence from Russia, which initiated the Finnish Civil War. Spain became one of the first nations to recognize Finland's independence on 21 February 1918. Both nations established diplomatic relations on 16 August 1918.

During the Spanish Civil War, Finland relocated its embassy from Madrid to Lisbon, Portugal in 1936 to avoid the fighting. A few Finnish citizens made up part of the International Brigades fighting for the Second Spanish Republic. With the victory of Francisco Franco and the end of the civil war, Finland recognized the new Spanish government on 31 March 1939. During World War II, both nations maintained diplomatic relations, however, neither country had a resident ambassador.

In 1942, Count Agustín de Foxá, Minister at the Spanish Legation in Helsinki, helped the Italian writer Curzio Malaparte - at the time a war correspondent in Finland - smuggle to Italy the manuscript of his book Kaputt and prevent its falling into the hands of the Gestapo.

Diplomatic relations between both nations normalized in 1955 with the naming and posting of resident ambassadors in their respective capitals.

In 1978, President Urho Kekkonen became the first Finnish head-of-state to pay an official visit to Spain. In July 1989, King Juan Carlos I paid his first and only visit to Finland. Both nations work closely together within the European Union with Spain becoming a member in 1986 and Finland joining the union in 1995.

On 17 May 2022, Spanish Prime Minister Pedro Sánchez welcomed the recent Finnish drive to apply for NATO membership and vowed a "swift" effort to ratify a formal application at the Cortes Generales. In October 2022, Spain fully ratified Finland's NATO membership application.

== Bilateral agreements ==
Both nations have signed several bilateral agreements such as a Treaty of conciliation, judicial settlement and arbitration (1928); Agreement to avoid double taxation on income and property taxes (1967); Agreement for the establishment of scheduled air services (1973); Agreement on international road transport (1976); Agreement on Cultural Cooperation (1979); Exchange of Notes on the reciprocal granting of authorizations to radio amateurs of both countries (1981); Agreement on Social Security Cooperation (1985); Agreement on reciprocal protection of classified information (2009); Memorandum of Understanding in the field of renewable energies between the Finnish Ministry of Economic Affairs and Employment and the Spanish Ministry of Industry (2010) and an Agreement to avoid double taxation and prevent tax evasion in the area of income taxes (2018).

== Tourism and transportation ==
In 2017, close to 800,000 Finnish citizens visited Spain for touristic purposes. That same year, Finnish tourists spent €867 million Euros in Spain. There are direct flights between Finland and Spain with the following airlines: Finnair, Iberia, Jet Time, Novair, Thomas Cook Airlines Scandinavia and Vueling.

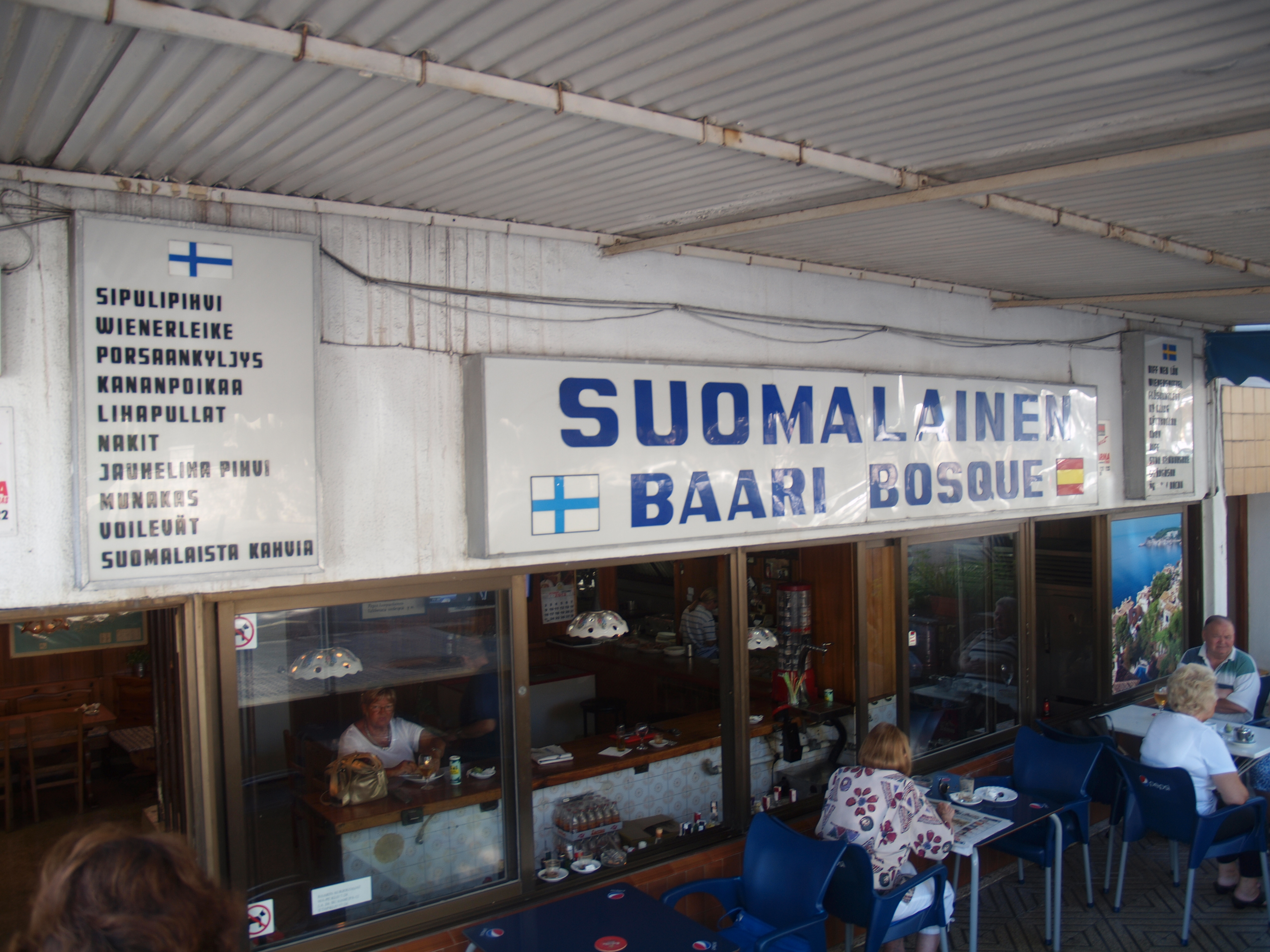
Finnish-style bar in Palma de Mallorca, Spain.

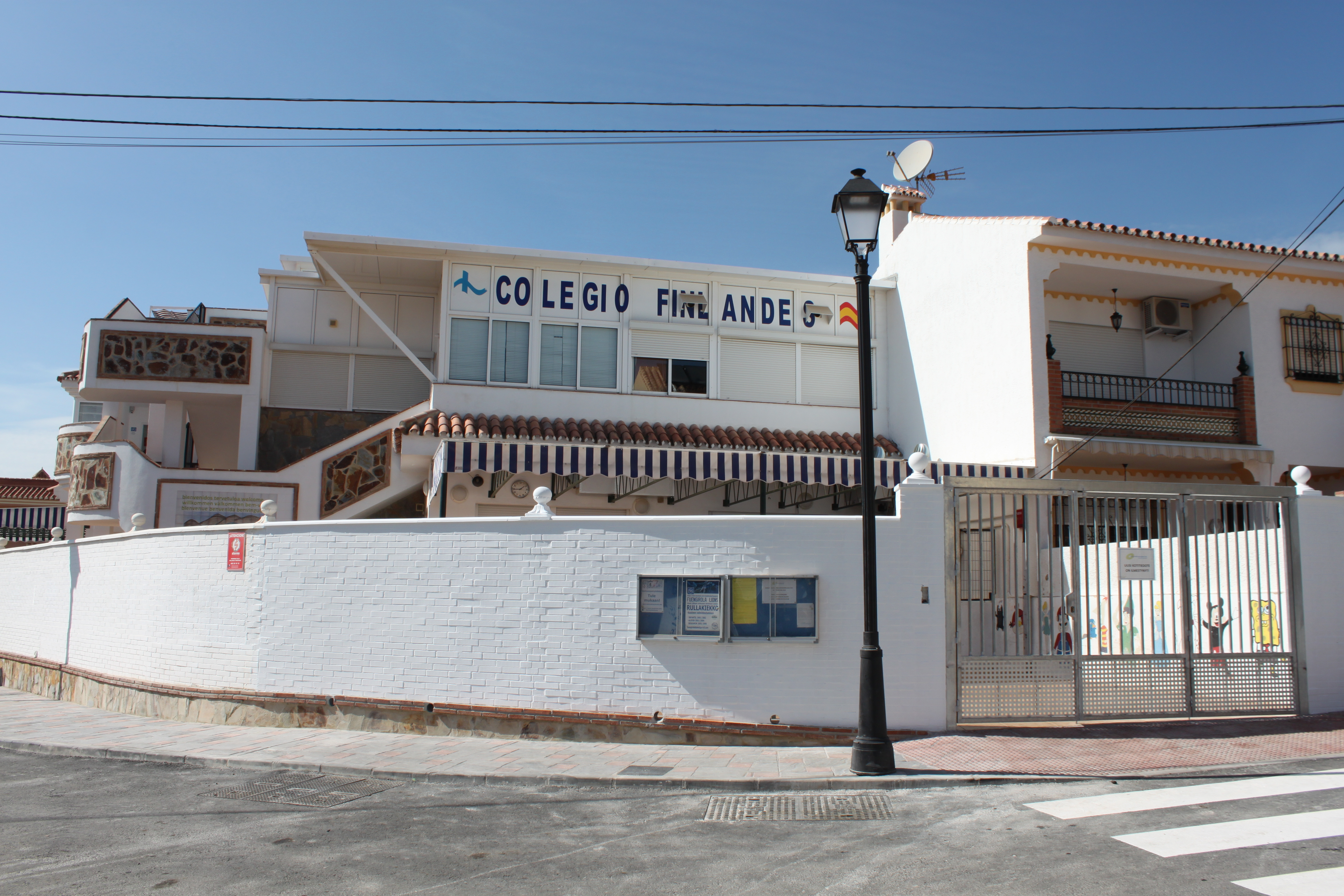
Colegio finlandés is a Finnish private school in Fuengirola, Costa del Sol, Spain.

== Trade ==
In 2025, trade between Finland and Spain totaled €2.7 billion Euros. Finland's main exports to Spain include: paper and cardboards; industrial machinery; machines and engines; and chemical based products. Spain main exports to Finland include: vehicles; iron and steel; and fruits and vegetables. In 2016, Spanish companies invested €196 million Euros in Finland. Over 250 Finnish companies operate in Spain.

== Resident diplomatic missions ==
- Finland has an embassy in Madrid.
- Spain has an embassy in Helsinki.
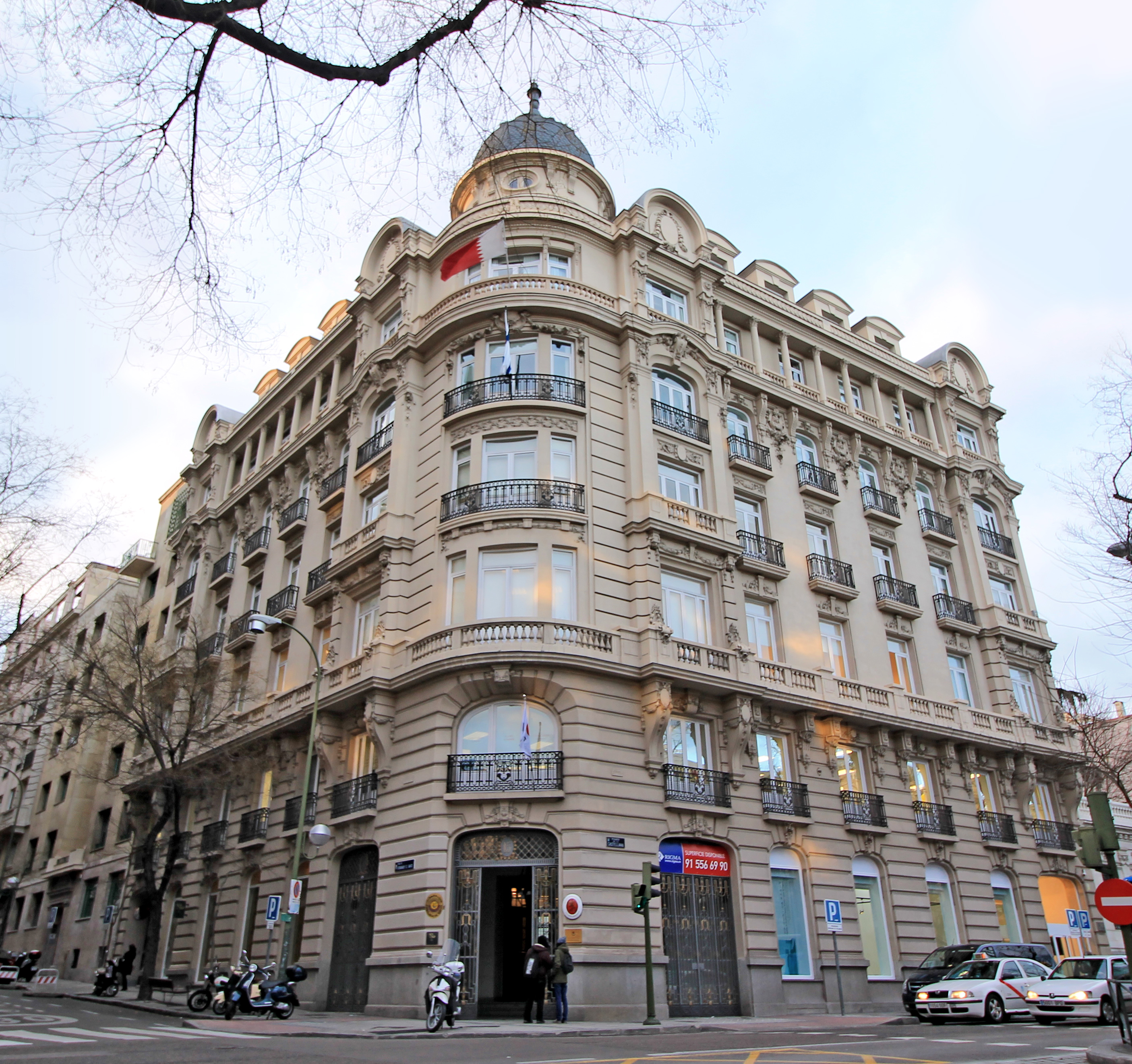
Embassy of Finland in Madrid

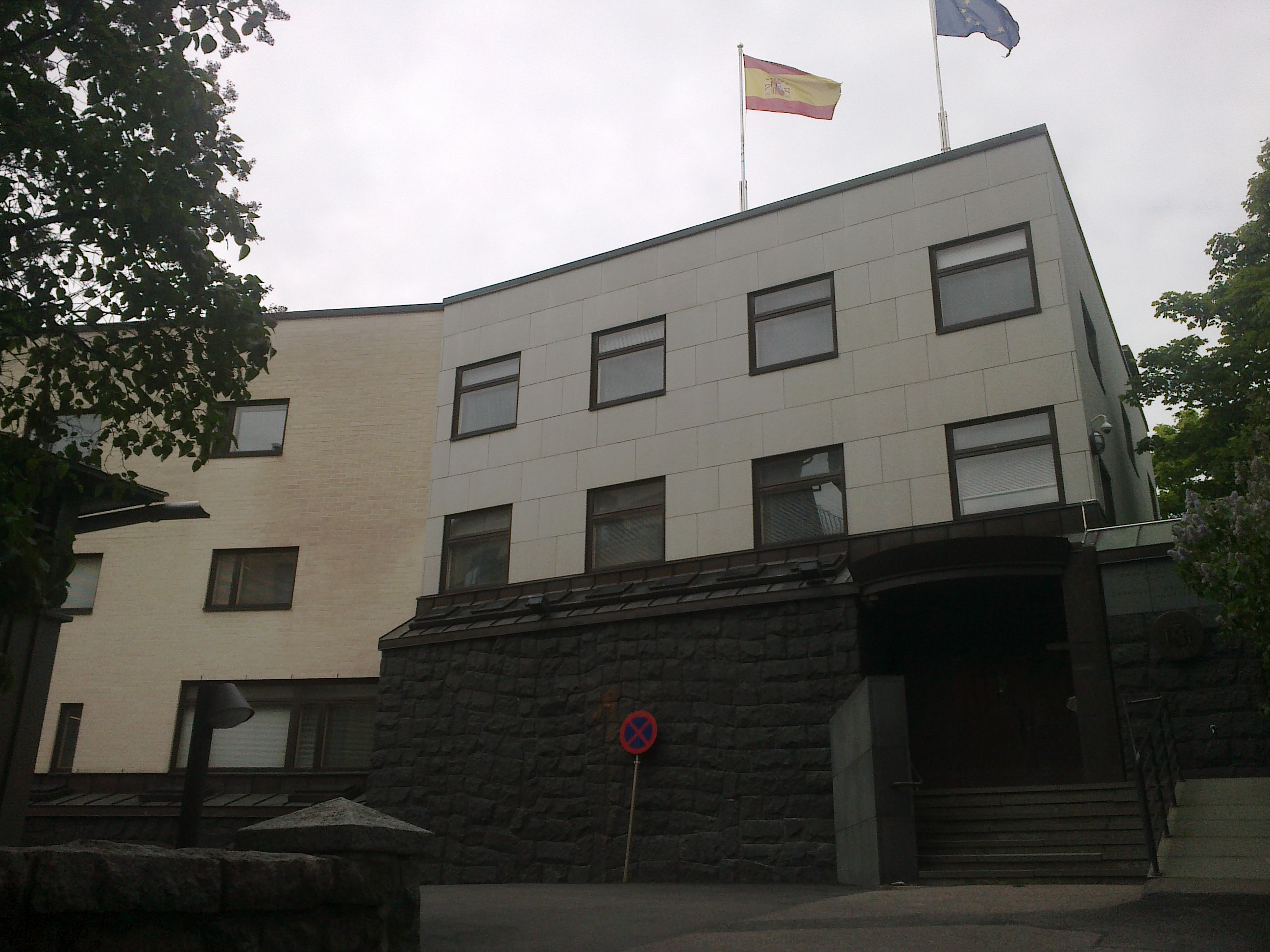
Embassy of Spain in Helsinki

== See also ==
- Foreign relations of Finland
- Foreign relations of Spain
- NATO-EU relations
