= The Volga Rises in Europe =

1943 book by Curzio Malaparte

- Title page for Il Volga nasce in Europa (1951 version)
- Author: Curzio Malaparte
- Original title: Il Volga nasce in Europa
- Translator: David Moore
- Language: Italian
- Genre: journalism
- Publisher: Bompiani
- Publication date: 1943
- Publication place: Italy
- English publication date: 1957
- Pages: 324

The Volga Rises in Europe (Italian: Il Volga nasce in Europa) is a book of World War II journalism by the Italian writer Curzio Malaparte.

== Summary ==
The book is a collection of newspaper articles about the Eastern Front during World War II that Malaparte wrote for the Corriere della Sera.

== Publication ==
The book was printed twice in 1943. The first edition was destroyed in Allied bombing and the second repressed by German authorities. It was republished and reached readers in Italy in 1951, and in English translation in 1957.

== Reception ==
The Times Literary Supplement wrote in its review: "If The Volga Rises in Europe does not quite come up to the level of [Malaparte's 1944 novel] Kaputt, and one has very much the feeling that it has already been stripped of many of its plums for earlier and other use, yet it convincingly confirms Malaparte's right, whatever his faults, to be rated one of the most brilliant reporters of our time." International Affairs wrote that The Volga Rises in Europe and Kaputt share the same "virtues and faults", but that Kaputt covers some of the same events in a more substantial way. The critic called Malaparte an "epic scene-painter of extraordinary power" and wrote that his sociological reflections about World War II are striking, although ultimately unconvincing.
