= Cicognini =

Cicognini is a surname. Notable people with the surname include:

- Alessandro Cicognini, (1906–1995) Italian film composer
- Giacinto Andrea Cicognini, (1606–1651) Italian playwright
- Jeanine Cicognini (born 1986), Swiss badminton player

== See also ==
- Cicognini National Boarding School, boarding school in Prato, Italy
