= Girolamo Seripando =

Augustinian friar

His Eminence Girolamo Seripando O.S.A.
- Archbishop of Salerno
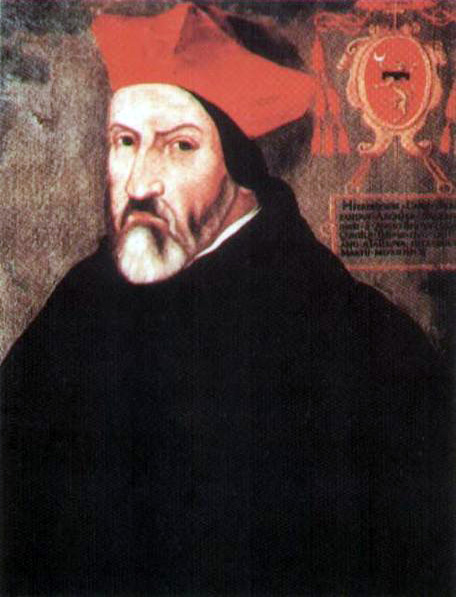
- Portrait of Cardinal Seripando, 16th century
- Church: Catholic Church
- Archdiocese: Salerno
- Appointed: 30 March 1554
- Term ended: 17 March 1563
- Predecessor: Lodovico Torres
- Successor: Gaspar Cervantes de Gaeta
- Other posts: Cardinal-Priest of Santa Susanna (1561-1563)

Orders
- Ordination: 1516
- Consecration: 15 May 1554 by Giovanni Michele Saraceni
- Created cardinal: 26 February 1561 by Pope Pius IV
- Rank: Cardinal-Priest

Personal details
- Born: 6 May 1493 Troia, Apulia, Italy
- Died: 17 March 1563 (aged 69) Trento, Italy
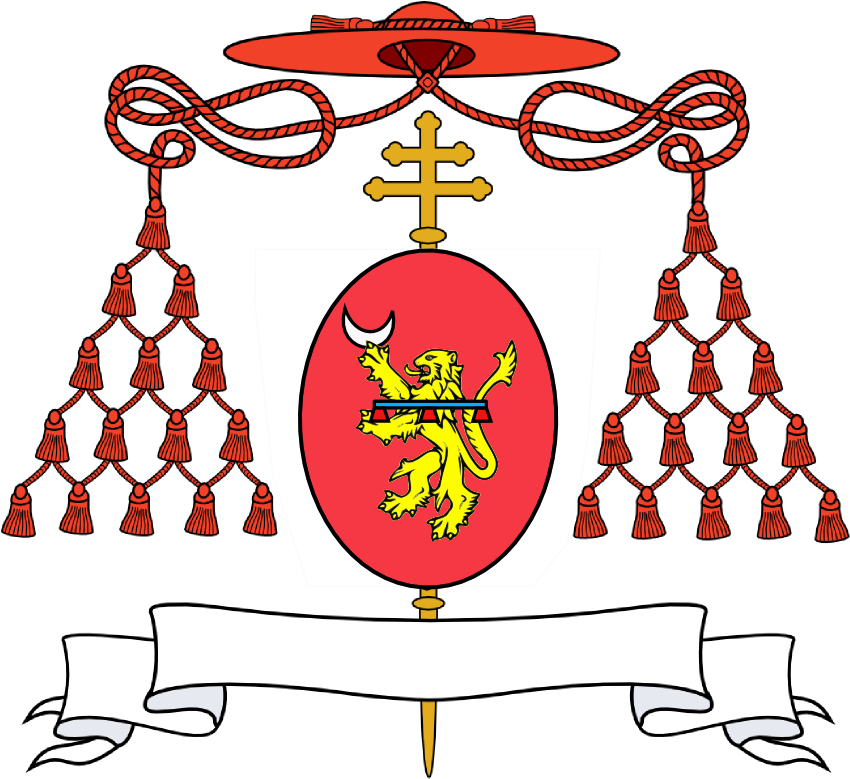
- Coat of arms

Girolamo Seripando (Troja, Apulia, 6 May 1493 – Trento, 17 March 1563) was an Augustinian friar, Italian theologian and cardinal.

== Life ==
He was of noble birth, and intended by his parents for the legal profession. After their death, however, at the age of fourteen, he entered the mendicant Order of Saint Augustine, at Viterbo, where he studied Greek and Hebrew as well as philosophy and theology.

After a short period in Rome, where he had been called by his prior general, he was appointed lecturer at Siena (1515), professor of theology at Bologna (1517). In 1532 he became vicar-general of the order, a role he filled with great credit for two years. He won such a reputation for eloquence by his discourses in the principal cities of Italy, that the Emperor Charles V often made it a point to be present at his sermons.

Elected prior general in 1539, he governed for twelve years. The 1913 Catholic Encyclopedia describes him as displaying "singular prudence, zeal, and piety." In 1546, he attended the sessions of the Council of Trent, where he distinguished himself by his zeal for the purity of biblical texts, and also by his views concerning original sin and justification that some council fathers felt were more in line with Lutheran opinions.

Pope Paul III sent him as papal legate to the emperor and to the King of France, after which he was offered the diocese of Aquila. Seripando not only declined this, but even resigned his position as prior general (1551), and withdrew to a small convent. In 1553 he was called from retirement to undertake a mission from the city of Naples to Charles V. Upon its completion he was appointed Archbishop of Salerno. The Catholic Encyclopedia describes him as a "zealous and efficient pastor."

In 1561 Pope Pius IV made Seripando a cardinal and appointed him the second legate of the Holy See at the Council of Trent. Upon the death of Cardinal Ercole Gonzaga, he became the council's first president.

== Works ==
The Catholic Encyclopedia describes Seripando as "an elegant and prolific writer, and a vigorous controversialist, rather than an orator." The following are his principal published works:

- Novae constitutiones ordinis S. Augustini (Venice, 1549)
- Oratio in funere Caroli V imperatoris (Naples, 1559)
- Prediche sopra il simbolo degli Apostoli, etc. (Venice, 1567)
- Commentarius in D. Pauli epistolas ad Galatas (Venice, 1569)
- Commentaria in D. Pauli epistolas ad Romanos et ad Galatas (Naples, 1601)
- De arte orandi (Lyons, 1670)
- several letters, included by Lagomarsini in Poggiani epist. et orationes (Rome, 1762).

== Sources ==
- Louis Ellies du Pin, L'histoire de l'Eglise (Paris, 1703)
- Odorico Raynaldi and Mansi, Annales Ecclesiastici (Lucca, 1735–6)
- Johann Felix Ossinger, Bibliotheca Augustiniana (Ingolstadt, 1768)
- Miranda, Salvador. "SERIPANDO, O.E.S.A., Girolamo (1493-1563)". The Cardinals of the Holy Roman Church. Florida International University. OCLC 53276621. Archived from the original on 2017-12-14.
- Abbondanza, Rocchina (1982). Girolamo Seripando tra Evangelismo e Riforma Cattolica. (in Italian). Naples: Editrice Ferraro 1982.
- Cesareo, Francesco C. (1999). A Shepherd in Their Midst: The Episcopacy of Girolamo Seripando (1554-1563). Augustinian Press, 1999.
- Jedin, Hubert (1947). Papal Legate at the Council of Trent: Cardinal Seripando. trans. Frederic C. Eckhoff (St. Louis: B. Herder, 1947).
- Olivier, D. (1968). "Les deux sermons sur la double et la triple justice," (in French). Öcumenica 3 (1968), pp. 39–69.
- Schmitz, Edwin F. (1955). Girolamo Seripando and Justification at the Council of Trent. St. Mary's Seminary (Baltimore, Md.), 1955.

Catholic Church titles
Preceded by Giovanni Vera	Archbishop of Salerno; 1554–1563	Succeeded by Gaspar Cervantes de Gaeta
Preceded by Jacques d'Annebaut	Cardinal-Priest of S. Susanna; 1561–1563	Succeeded by Francisco Pacheco de Toledo
