= Norman Lewis (writer) =

British travel writer and novelist (1908–2003)

- Born: John Frederick Norman Lewis; 28 June 1908; Forty Hill, Enfield, England
- Died: 22 July 2003 (aged 95); Saffron Walden, Essex, England
- Occupations: Travel writer; novelist

John Frederick Norman Lewis (28 June 1908 – 22 July 2003) was a British writer. While he is best known for his travel writing, he also wrote twelve novels and several volumes of autobiography.

Subjects he explored in his travel writing include life in Naples during the Allied liberation of Italy (Naples '44); Vietnam and French colonial Indochina (A Dragon Apparent); Indonesia (An Empire of the East); Burma (Golden Earth); tribal peoples of India (A Goddess in the Stones); Sicily and the Mafia (The Honoured Society and In Sicily); and the destruction caused by Christian missionaries in Latin America and elsewhere (The Missionaries).

His newspaper article entitled "Genocide in Brazil" (1969) prompted the creation of Survival International—an organisation dedicated to the protection of indigenous peoples around the world.

Graham Greene described Lewis as "one of the best writers, not of any particular decade, but of our century".

== Early life ==
Lewis came from a Welsh family and in later life identified – at least partially – as Welsh, but he was born at "Clifton" (which Lewis called a "quiet, rather dismal little house"), 343, Carterhatch Lane, Enfield, Middlesex, a suburb of London, to pharmacist Richard George Lewis (d. 1936) and his wife Louise Charlotte (née Evans; d. 1950). His parents became spiritualists after the deaths of Lewis's elder brothers, and hoped young Lewis would grow up to become a medium. A clever child, Lewis was bullied by other children, and sent by his parents to live for a couple of years with three deeply religious "half-mad aunts" in Wales. Having been educated at Enfield Grammar School, as a young man, Lewis tried a variety of ways to make a living in the Great Depression of the 1930s, including self-employed wedding photographer, auctioneer, umbrella wholesaler and briefly a motorcycle racer at Harringay Stadium and White City. At this time of his life, he was a "young rake and dandy" with a "love of fast cars and adventure". For some years during this period, he set up home in Woodberry Down near Manor House in London.

Lewis's different books give varying accounts of his British Army service in World War II. In his autobiography, Jackdaw Cake, he says he served in the Intelligence Corps in Algiers, Tunisia and Naples in 1942-44; elsewhere says he was eventually commissioned as a second lieutenant and served with the 1st King's Dragoon Guards, an armoured regiment in the Italian Campaign. His account of experiences during the Allied occupation of Italy, Naples '44 (1978) was called by The Telegraph "one of the great first-hand accounts of the Second World War." Shortly after the war he wrote books about Burma, Golden Earth (1952), and French Indochina, A Dragon Apparent (1951), which The Telegraph similarly praised as " the finest record of Indo-China before the devastation wrought by the Vietnam War".

== Tribal societies ==
Another major concern of Lewis's was the impact of missionary activity on tribal societies in Latin America and elsewhere. He was hostile to the activities of missionaries, especially American evangelicals. This is covered in his book The Missionaries, and several shorter pieces. He frequently said that he regarded his life's major achievement as the worldwide reaction to writing on tribal societies in South America. In 1968, his article "Genocide in Brazil", published in the Sunday Times after a journey to Brazil with the war photographer Don McCullin, created such an outcry that it led to the creation of the organisation Survival International, dedicated to the protection of first peoples around the world. Lewis later said of this article that it was "the most worthwhile of all my endeavours".

== Writing ==
Lewis was fascinated by cultures which were little touched by the modern world. This is reflected in his books on travels in Indonesia, An Empire of the East, and among the tribal peoples of India, A Goddess in the Stones.

Lewis wrote several volumes of autobiography, concerned primarily with his observations of the many places in which he lived at various times, including St Catherine's Island in South Wales near Tenby, the Bloomsbury district of London during the Second World War, Nicaragua, a Spanish fishing village (Voices of the Old Sea), and a village near Rome.

Lewis also wrote twelve novels. Some of these enjoyed significant success at the time of publication, but his literary reputation rests mainly on his travel writing.

== Family ==
Lewis's first wife, Ernestina Corvaja, was a Swiss-Sicilian. Sicilian life, including the role of the Mafia, was a major theme, which he explored in The Honoured Society (1964) and In Sicily (2000). While never losing sight of the horrors inflicted by the Mafia, his accounts were not sensationalist. They were based on a detailed understanding of Sicilian society, and a deep sympathy with the sufferings of the Sicilian people. The Latin connection encouraged him to travel, resulting in his first book, Spanish Adventure (1935). The marriage had, however, failed by the start of the Second World War in 1939. He was briefly married a second time, after the war.

He died in Saffron Walden, Essex, survived by his third wife, Lesley, and their three children; and by two children from his second marriage with Hester; and by a son from his first marriage.

Lewis said that he believed in "absolutely nothing" and indeed "I do not believe in belief." He did not believe that humanity was making progress. He talked about "the intense joy I derive from being alive", and said that he was "exceedingly happy".

== Bibliography ==
=== Novels ===
- Samara (Cape 1949)
- Within the Labyrinth (Cape 1950; US: 1986 Carroll)
- A Single Pilgrim (Cape 1953; US: 1953 Rinehart)
- The Day of the Fox (Cape 1955; US: 1955 Rinehart)
- The Volcanoes Above Us (Cape 1957; US: 1957 Pantheon, not dated)
- Darkness Visible (Cape 1960; US: 1960 Pantheon)
- The Tenth Year of the Ship (Collins 1962; US: 1962 Harcourt)
- A Small War Made to Order (Collins 1966; US: 1966 Brace)
- Every Man's Brother (Heinemann 1967; US: 1968 Morrow)
- Flight from a Dark Equator (Collins 1972; US: 1972 Putnam)
- The Sicilian Specialist (Random 1974; UK: 1975 Collins)
- The German Company (Collins 1979)
- The Cuban Passage (Collins 1982; US: 1982 Pantheon)
- A Suitable Case for Corruption (Hamilton 1984; US: 1984 Pantheon, as The Man in the Middle)
- The March of the Long Shadows (Secker 1987)

=== Travel and miscellaneous ===
- Spanish Adventure (1935, later disowned)
- Sand and Sea in Arabia (Routledge 1938)
- A Dragon Apparent: Travels in Indo-China (Cape 1951, Eland 1982; US: Scribner's 1951)
- Golden Earth: Travels in Burma (Cape 1952; US: Scribner's 1952)
- The Changing Sky: Travels of a Novelist (Cape 1959; US: Pantheon 1959)
- The Honoured Society: The Mafia Conspiracy Observed (Collins 1964, Eland 2003; US: Putnam's 1964)
- Naples '44: An Intelligence Officer in the Italian Labyrinth (Collins 1978, Eland 1983; US: Pantheon 1978)
- Voices of the Old Sea (Hamilton 1984; US: Viking 1985)
- Jackdaw Cake (Hamilton 1985; new edition by Eland 2013) – an autobiography
- A View of the World (Eland 1986)
- The Missionaries (Secker 1988; US: McGraw 1988)
- To Run Across the Sea (Cape 1989)
- A Goddess in the Stones: Travels in India (Cape 1991; US: Holt 1992) (Thomas Cook Travel Book Award)
- An Empire of the East: Travels in Indonesia (Cape 1993; US: Holt 1993)
- I Came I Saw (Picador 1994) – extended issue of 'Jackdaw Cake'
- The World, The World: Memoirs of a Legendary Traveler (Cape 1996; US: Holt 1997)
- The Happy Ant-Heap (Cape 1998)
- In Sicily (Cape 2000)
- A Voyage by Dhow (and other pieces) (Cape 2001)
- The Tomb in Seville (Cape 2003)
