= The Skin (film) =

- Theatrical release poster
- Directed by: Liliana Cavani
- Written by: Robert Katz; Liliana Cavani; Catherine Breillat
- Based on: The Skin by Curzio Malaparte
- Produced by: Manolo Bolognini; Renzo Rossellini
- Starring: Marcello Mastroianni; Burt Lancaster
- Cinematography: Armando Nannuzzi
- Edited by: Ruggero Mastroianni
- Music by: Lalo Schifrin
- Distributed by: Cinefrance (Germany); Gaumont Italia (Italy)
- Release date: 27 August 1981
- Running time: 131 minutes
- Country: Italy
- Languages: Italian; English

The Skin (Italian: La pelle) is a 1981 Italian war film directed by Liliana Cavani and starring Marcello Mastroianni, Burt Lancaster, Ken Marshall, Carlo Giuffrè and Claudia Cardinale from Curzio Malaparte's 1949 novel The Skin. It was entered into the 1981 Cannes Film Festival.

== Plot ==
Naples, 1944. General Mark Clark, commander of the United States Fifth Army, is negotiating with Eduardo Marzullo, a Camorra mobster, the delivery of 112 German soldiers captured during the four days of insurrection. Marzullo demands from the Americans a bribe of one hundred lire per kilo, susceptible to strong increases if not quickly paid, for each prisoner. The intermediary is the Italian liaison captain Curzio Malaparte who is also given the task of pleasing the aviator wife of an American senator, and of organizing a Renaissance style dinner that has as its highlight a fish: a "siren" of the Naples aquarium which looks like a cooked child.

Meanwhile in the slums, mothers sell their children as prostitutes to the Moroccan soldiers, and Jim, the young American liaison captain friend of Malaparte, falls in love with a young girl. He discovers she is being exposed by her father for a fee as the only virgin existing in the city. Malaparte moves in this "hell on earth" scenario with detachment. He tries to explain to the woman, during an orgy of homosexuals, that it is the corrupting power of the Americans which has so reduced the moral qualms of the starving people of the city, who are now severely impoverished by the war.

Vesuvius suddenly breaks out in an eruption, during which the aviator undergoes a cruel rape experience from a group of drunken and upset soldiers, an experience that brings her to the same level of all the other innocent and defeated women around her.

The story ends with the arrival of the Fifth Army in Rome through the Appian Way. Among the crowd that welcomes the Americans, and amidst the enthusiasm of the liberation, an unfortunate man ends up crushed under a military tank.

== Cast ==
- Marcello Mastroianni - Curzio Malaparte
- Burt Lancaster - Gen. Mark Clark
- Claudia Cardinale - Princess Consuelo Caracciolo
- Ken Marshall - Jimmy Wren
- Alexandra King - Deborah Wyatt
- Carlo Giuffrè - Eduardo Mazzullo
- Yann Babilée - Jean-Louis
- Jeanne Valérie - Princess in Capri
- Liliana Tari - Maria Concetta
- Peppe Barra - Taylorman (as Giuseppe Barra)
- Cristina Donadio - Friend of Anna
- Rosaria Della Femmina - Jimmy's lover (as Maria Rosaria Della Femmina)
- Jacques Sernas - Gen. Guillaume
- Gianni Abbate
- Anna Maria Ackermann
- Richard E. Carr - PVT Kaminski
