= Don Camaleo =

1946 novel by Curzio Malaparte

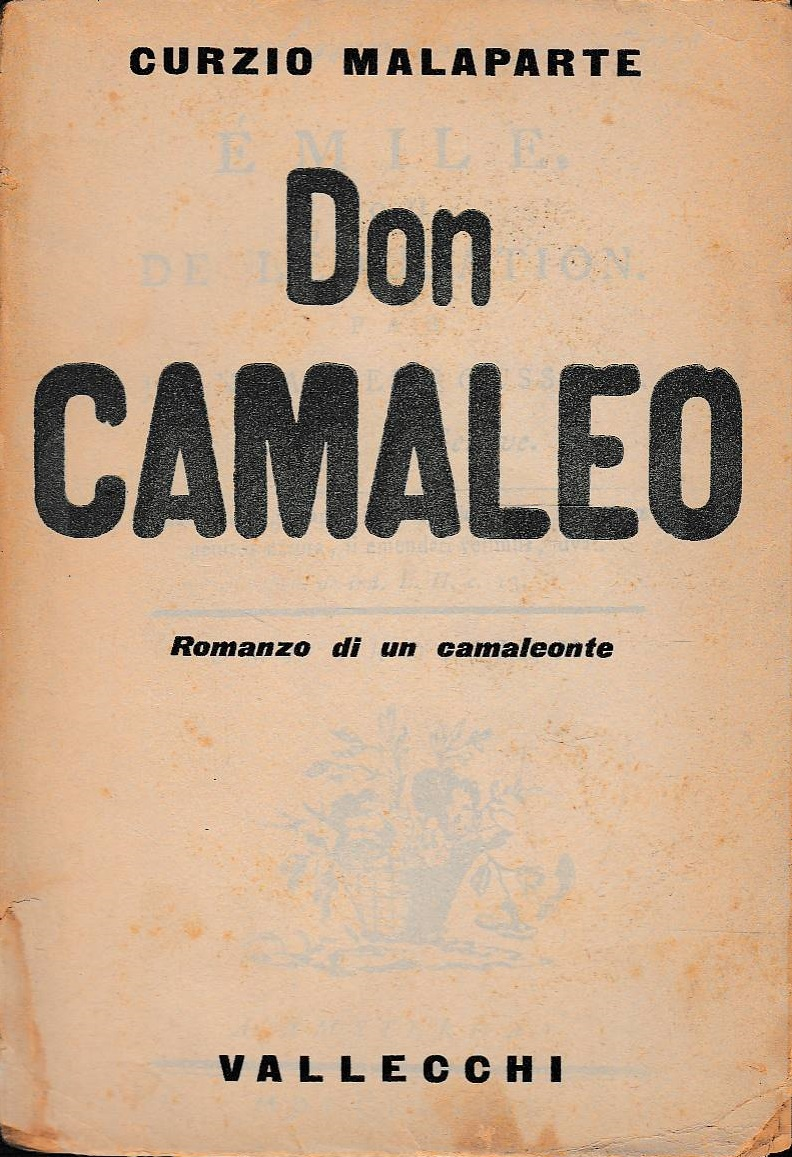
- Author: Curzio Malaparte
- Language: Italian
- Publisher: Vallecchi
- Publication date: 1946
- Publication place: Italy
- Pages: 342

Don Camaleo. Romanzo di un camaleonte is a novel by the Italian writer Curzio Malaparte. A satirical story targeted at Italy's political class, it is about a chameleon who learns to speak, is taught about human culture and succeeds to get elected to the parliament.

== Publication ==
Malaparte wrote Don Camaleo in 1926. Its premise was inspired by Piero Gobetti's assessment of contemporary Italy, and the intention was that Gobetti should publish the book. When Gobetti went into exile in France and died there, Malaparte abandoned the book for two years. He revived it in 1928, when it was supposed to be serialised in Giornale di Genova's cultural supplement La Chiosa and published as a book by Leo Longanesi's La Voce. Only a few chapters were serialised before it was stopped by the state censorship. Malaparte was reprimanded by the fascist government, and soon thereafter La Chiosa was banned and Giornale di Genova's editor-in-chief forced to resign. Malaparte revised Don Camaleo before Vallecchi published the full novel in 1946.
