= Galileo (1968 film) =

1968 Italian film

- Directed by: Liliana Cavani
- Written by: Liliana Cavani; Tullio Pinelli; Fabrizio Onofri
- Produced by: Leo Pescarolo
- Starring: Cyril Cusack; Georgi Kaloyanchev; Piero Vida
- Cinematography: Alfio Contini
- Edited by: Nino Baragli
- Music by: Ennio Morricone
- Production companies: Rizzoli Film; Fenice Cinematografica; Kinozenter
- Distributed by: Cineriz
- Release date: September 7, 1968 (Italy)
- Running time: 105/92 minutes
- Countries: Italy; Bulgaria
- Language: Italian

Galileo (also known as Galileo Galilei) is a 1968 Italian–Bulgarian biographical drama film directed by Liliana Cavani. It depicts the life of Galileo Galilei and particularly his conflicts with the Catholic Church over his scientific theories.

== Plot ==
Astronomer Galileo Galilei teaches at the University of Padua. While he questions the ideas of Ptolemy and Aristotle, the official scientific dogmas imposed by the Catholic Church, he remains secretive about his doubts. His more candid friend, philosopher Giordano Bruno, is reported to the Inquisition for his revolutionary ideas and later executed as a heretic. Still, Galileo continues his studies with a telescope constructed by Dutch technicians and perfected by him, and comes to the conclusion that Copernico's heliocentric system is valid. He publishes his discoveries in a book, which leads to a series of interrogations by the Inquisition. Facing a possible death sentence, Galileo publicly recants his theories.

== Cast ==
- Cyril Cusack as Galileo Galilei
- Georgi Kaloyanchev as Giordano Bruno
- Nevena Kokanova as Marina
- Nicolai Doicev as Cardinal Bellarmino
- Georgi Cherkelov as Paolo Sarpi
- Piero Vida as Pope Urban VIII
- Gigi Ballista as Dominican Commissioner
- Paolo Graziosi as Gian Lorenzo Bernini
- Maia Dragomanska as Galilei's daughter
- Lou Castel as Father Charles
- Giulio Brogi as Sagredo

== Production and release ==
Originally intended as a miniseries co-produced by Italian and Bulgarian film companies, radio and television company RAI refused to broadcast the finished film and sold the distribution rights to Cineriz, who trimmed the originally 105 minutes long film to 92 minutes running time.

Galileo was shown in competition at the 1968 Venice International Film Festival.

== Home media ==
Galileo was released in 2010 as a Region 2 DVD.

== See also ==
- Life of Galileo, a play by Bertolt Brecht
- Galileo, a 1975 film adaptation of Brecht's play
