= Those Cursed Tuscans =

1956 book by Curzio Malaparte

- Author: Curzio Malaparte
- Original title: Maledetti toscani
- Translator: Rex Benedict
- Language: Italian
- Subject: Tuscany
- Publisher: Vallecchi
- Publication date: 1956
- Publication place: Italy
- English publication date: 7 September 1964
- Pages: 261

Those Cursed Tuscans (Italian: Maledetti toscani) is a 1956 book by the Italian writer Curzio Malaparte.

== Summary ==
The book is a long essay on the Italian region of Tuscany, its culture and its capital Florence. Curzio Malaparte seeks to define what distinguishes the region and what, in his view, makes other Italians fear the Tuscans. Malaparte argues that Tuscans value intelligence, are direct and realistic. Unlike other Italians, they have a way of speaking and writing that is not musical and ornated with phrases. Because of these and other characteristics, he argues that Tuscans have resisted succumbing to church authorities and political oppressors.

== Reception ==
The New York Times wrote that the book "contains all the assets and defects of Malaparte's artistic gift", calling it "amusing, paradoxical and challenging", "often pretentious and bombastic", and saved by "the humor and the acute intelligence of the author". Kirkus Reviews called the book a "capriciously acid portrait" and praised the translation by Rex Benedict, who rendered its "mischievous prose" into English. Time described Those Cursed Tuscans as Malaparte's apologia for his own lifestyle and an exposition of his personal philosophy, which appears in strong contrast to fascist "mass hysteria".
