= Naples '44 =

1978 memoir by Norman Lewis

- Title page for Naples '44 (1978)
- Author: Norman Lewis
- Language: English
- Genre: memoir, diary
- Publisher: William Collins; Eland Books
- Publication date: 1978 (hardback); 1983 (paperback)
- Publication place: United Kingdom
- Media type: Print
- Pages: 206

Naples '44: An Intelligence Officer in the Italian Labyrinth is a military memoir of the Second World War written by the British travel writer and novelist Norman Lewis that was first published in 1978.

The book is in the form of a diary that was kept by Lewis while he was a sergeant in the Field Security Service of the British Army Intelligence Corps in southern Italy from September 1943 to October 1944.

The military historian Sir John Keegan has described it, together with George MacDonald Fraser’s Quartered Safe Out Here, as "one of the great personal memoirs of the Second World War".

Lewis's memoir is notable for its depiction of the wartime suffering endured by the civilian population of the city of Naples. His harrowing and moving account of a group of orphaned blind girls being refused food in a restaurant in the city has been referenced by several other authors:

The experience changed my outlook. Until now I had clung to the comforting belief that human beings eventually come to terms with pain and sorrow. Now I understood I was wrong, and like Paul I suffered a conversion – but to pessimism. These little girls, any one of whom could be my daughter, came into the restaurant weeping, and they were weeping when they were led away. I knew that, condemned to everlasting darkness, hunger and loss, they would weep on incessantly. They would never recover from their pain, and I would never recover from the memory of it.

Naples '44 was first published by William Collins in 1978 and republished as a paperback by Eland Books in 1983.

An Italian/English documentary film based upon it, Napoli '44/Naples '44, directed by Francesco Patierno and narrated by Benedict Cumberbatch, premiered at the Rome International Film Festival in October 2016.

== See also ==
- The Skin, a similar account of Naples under Allied occupation
