= Coup d'État: The Technique of Revolution =

1931 book by Curzio Malaparte

- Tecnica del colpo di stato, 1948 Italian translation
- Author: Curzio Malaparte
- Original title: Technique du coup d'état
- Translator: Sylvia Saunders
- Language: French
- Subject: Coup d'état
- Publisher: Éditions Grasset
- Publication date: 1931
- Publication place: France
- English publication date: 1932
- Pages: 297

Coup d'État: The Technique of Revolution (French: Technique du coup d'état; Italian: Tecnica del colpo di stato) is a 1931 book by the Italian writer Curzio Malaparte.

== Summary ==
Coup d'État: The Technique of Revolution consists of Curzio Malaparte's reflections on modern coups d'état. It devotes chapters to the Bolshevik Revolution with a focus on Leon Trotsky's and Vladimir Lenin's roles, the 1920 Battle of Warsaw, the Kapp Putsch in Germany, Napoleon Bonaparte as the inventor of the modern coup d'état, Miguel Primo de Rivera's rise to power in Spain, Benito Mussolini and the March on Rome, and the possibility that Adolf Hitler will come to power in Germany.

== Publication ==
The book was written in Paris after Malaparte had fallen out with the Italian Fascist Party, with which he had a turbulent relationship. It was first published in French in 1931 by Bernard Grasset, from a translation by Juliette Bertrand (293 pages) and in English translation by Sylvia Saunders in 1932 (New York : E.P. Dutton & Co.). In Italian it appeared in 1948 as Tecnica del colpo di stato (Milano, Valentino Bompiani). The book created controversy and Malaparte was accused of cynicism and hypocrisy. Because of its negative assessment of Hitler, Malaparte was persecuted and imprisoned in Italy for spreading "antifascist propaganda abroad".

After being out of print for decades, the book has been republished by Tikhanov Library, in the Saunders translation, as Coup d'Etat. This version contains an appendix consisting of a speech given by Leon Trotsky addressing his portrayal by Malaparte.
