= The Skin (novel) =

1949 novel by Curzio Malaparte

- Author: Curzio Malaparte
- Original title: La pelle
- Language: Italian
- Publisher: Aria d'Italia
- Publication date: 1949
- Publication place: Italy
- Pages: 416

The Skin (Italian: La pelle) is a 1949 autobiographical novel by the Italian writer Curzio Malaparte.

== Plot ==
The Skin is a fictionalised account of the Allied occupation of Naples after Italy's defeat in World War II, during which Malaparte, whose homonymous author persona appears as the book's narrator, worked as a liaison officer for the American army. The book consists of vignettes about degradation, prostitution and cruelty.

== Reception ==
Like Malaparte's 1944 book Kaputt, The Skin became successful internationally. In 2006, Gary Indiana wrote in Bookforum that The Skin has "the densely packed, peripatetic, demonic abandon of a vaudeville revue in hell" and makes the supposed liberation of Italy appear as a gross nightmare. When it was published in the NYRB Classics series in 2013, Time Out New York wrote that it has a "unique, smirking idiom" and that the main character comes off as cynical and as "a sort of spokesman for the defeated nation, at once obsequious and condescending to his new American overlords".

== Adaptation ==
The book was adapted into the 1981 film The Skin directed by Liliana Cavani.

== See also ==
- Naples '44, a similar account of Naples under Allied occupation
