= Girolamo Lagomarsini =

Italian humanist

Reverend Girolamo Lagomarsini
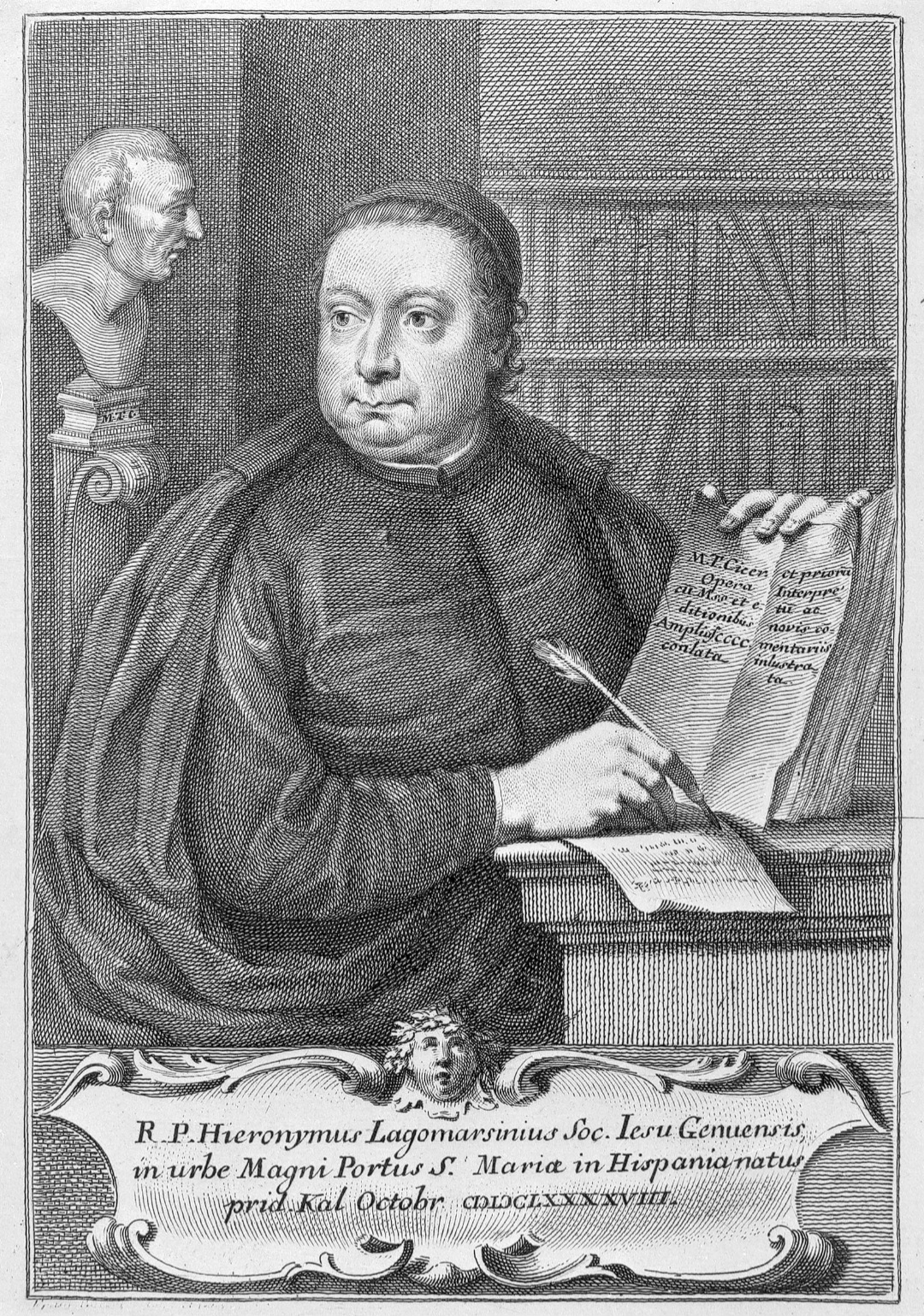
- Engraved portrait of Girolamo Lagomarsini by Francesco Bartolozzi
- Born: September 30, 1698; El Puerto de Santa María, Spain
- Died: 18 May 1773 (aged 74); Rome, Papal States
- Occupations: Jesuit priest; Philologist; Classical scholar
- Known for: Critical edition of the works of Cicero

Academic background
- Education: Cicognini National Boarding School; Collegio Romano

Academic work
- Discipline: Classics, Latin literature
- Institutions: Pontifical Gregorian University
- Influenced: Barthold Georg Niebuhr; Amedeo Peyron; Karl Gottlob Zumpt; Friedrich Ellendt

Girolamo Lagomarsini SJ (30 September 1698 – 18 May 1773) was an Italian humanist and philologist. Born into a wealthy Genoese family in Spain, he studied classical literature in Arezzo and Rome. Later holding a chair at the Collegium Gregorianum he published a collection of Latin orations and conducted influential research on the text of the Roman author Cicero.

== Biography ==
Girolamo Lagomarsini was born on 30 September 1698 at El Puerto de Santa María (Spain), of a wealthy Genoese family. In 1708, he went to Italy and commenced his studies in the College of the Jesuits at Prato, in Tuscany. In 1721, he began to teach rhetoric at the college of Arezzo. Four years afterwards, he went to Rome to complete his theological studies, after which he returned to his duties at Arezzo. In 1732, he was appointed to the chair of rhetoric at Florence, and in 1751 to that of Greek in the Collegium Gregorianum at Rome, which position he occupied until his death on 18 May 1773.

== Works ==
Lagomarsini left several works on classical literature; he published Latin orations (1746) and epistles, a poem On the Origin of Springs, (De Origine Fontium, 1749), and other works.

From 1735 to 1744, he collected material for a new edition of Cicero, which, however, was never published. Barthold Georg Niebuhr was the first to make use of Lagomarsini's vast collection of various readings preserved in the Roman College. An industrious scholar, Lagomarsini collated all the manuscripts of Cicero accessible to him in Florence and elsewhere. In such a vast bulk of material, there is much that is valuable, and yet a great deal is of little use to the modern scholar because of the indiscriminate way in which the material was gathered. Reading follows upon variant reading without any critical analysis of the text or any attempt at a new interpretation. To be sure, this is not so much a personal fault of Lagomarsini as a characteristic of the era in which he lived and worked. At that time, the mere gathering of erudite material was considered to be valuable and a sense of discrimination had not yet been attained. Nonetheless, the variants collected by Lagomarsini stimulated questions concerning textual history, thus making a valuable contribution to the development of modern textual criticism.

== Bibliography ==
- This article incorporates public domain material from McClintock, John; Strong, James (1867–1887). Cyclopædia of Biblical, Theological and Ecclesiastical Literature. Harper and Brothers.
- Arato, Franco (2004). "LAGOMARSINI, Girolamo". Dizionario Biografico degli Italiani (in Italian). Vol. 63: Labroca–Laterza. Rome: Istituto dell'Enciclopedia Italiana. ISBN 978-88-12-00032-6.
- Prete, Sesto (1960). "The codices Vaticani Latini 11414-11709". Traditio. 16: 522–529. doi:10.1017/S036215290000619X. JSTOR 27830419. S2CID 151814081.
