= Cicognini National Boarding School =

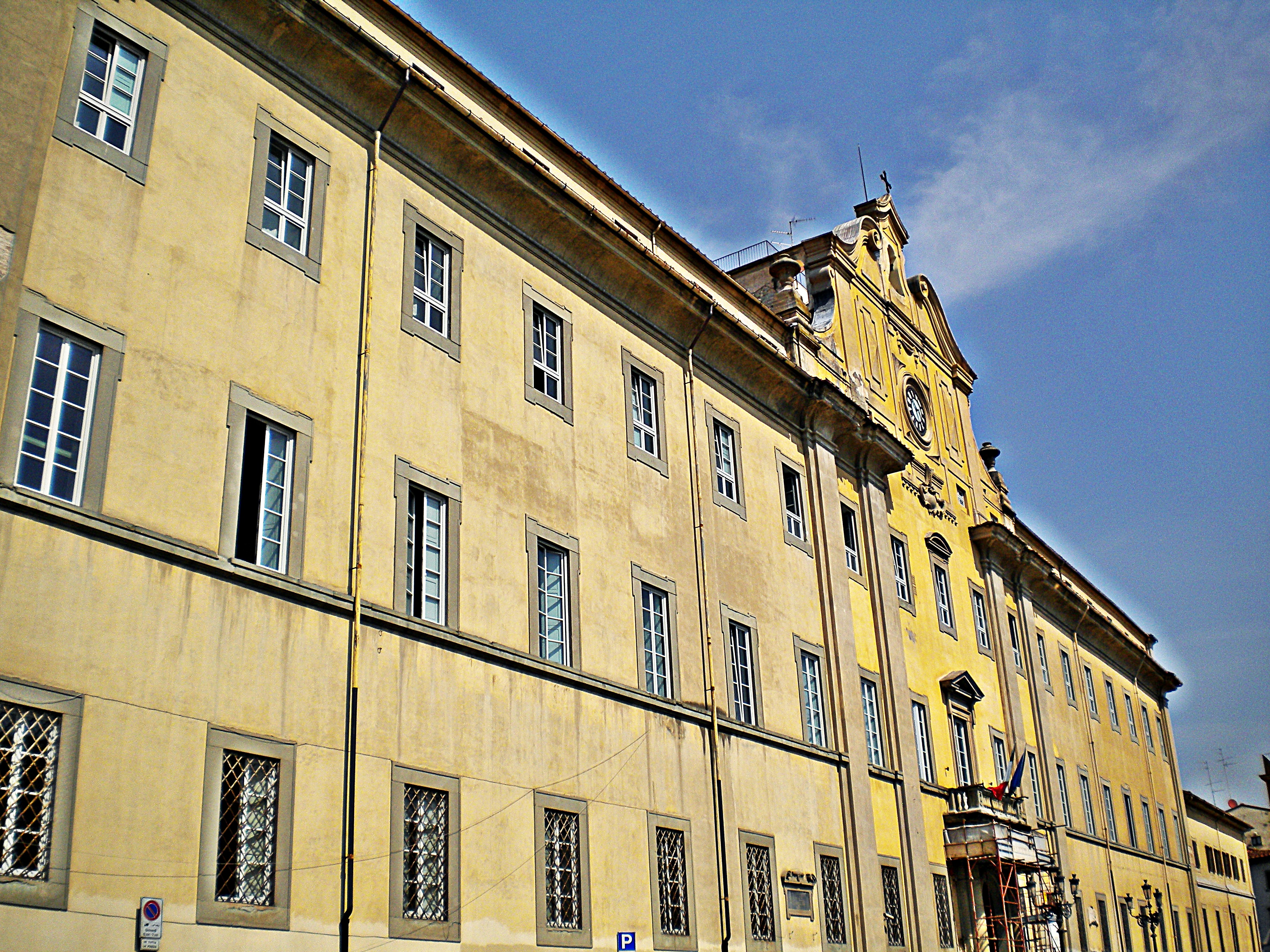
- Facade of the Cicognini National Boarding School

Location
- Prato, Tuscany; Italy; 43°52′44″N 11°05′38″E

Information
- Type: Private primary and secondary school
- Religious affiliation: Catholicism
- Denomination: Jesuits
- Established: 1692; 334 years ago

The Cicognini National Boarding School is a private Catholic primary and secondary school located in Prato, Tuscany, Italy. Established by the Jesuits in c. 1692, the school is the oldest school in the city and follows the legacy of Francesco Cicognini.

== Boarding school history ==
The Cicognini National Boarding School of Prato is the oldest educational institution in the city. Founded in 1692 by Jesuit priests, it was the center of culture in the Grand Duchy of Tuscany, the Kingdom of Italy, and the Italian Republic. Cicognini National Boarding School remains a cultural and training centre for Italy, with significant influence in Tuscany and the metropolitan area of Prato-Florence-Pistoia.

== Interior ==
The school contains a theater dedicated to Gabriele D'Annunzio, with frescoes decorating the ceiling and stage. The school also houses the Chapel of the Boarders, with a Baroque altar, Madonna, organ, and paintings. The school's refectory is decorated by frescoes as well, and its reception room has a painting dedicated to Gabriele D'Annunzio.

== Notable alumni ==
- Gabriele D'Annunzio, (1863–1938) – writer, poet, journalist, and political activist who attended the Cicognini National High School from 1874 to 1881
- Sem Benelli – writer and playwright
- Giovanni Bertini
- Ranieri de' Calzabigi – poet and librettist
- Carlo Azeglio Ciampi – President of the Republic
- Girolamo Lagomarsini, (1698–1773) – humanist and philologist
- Giovanni Lami – jurist, historian, and antiquarian
- Tommaso Landolfi – writer, translator and literary critic
- Curzio Malaparte, (1898–1957) – journalist, dramatist, writer, and diplomat who was born in Prato
- Marcello Pera – Senate President
- Bettino Ricasoli – statesman

== Gallery ==
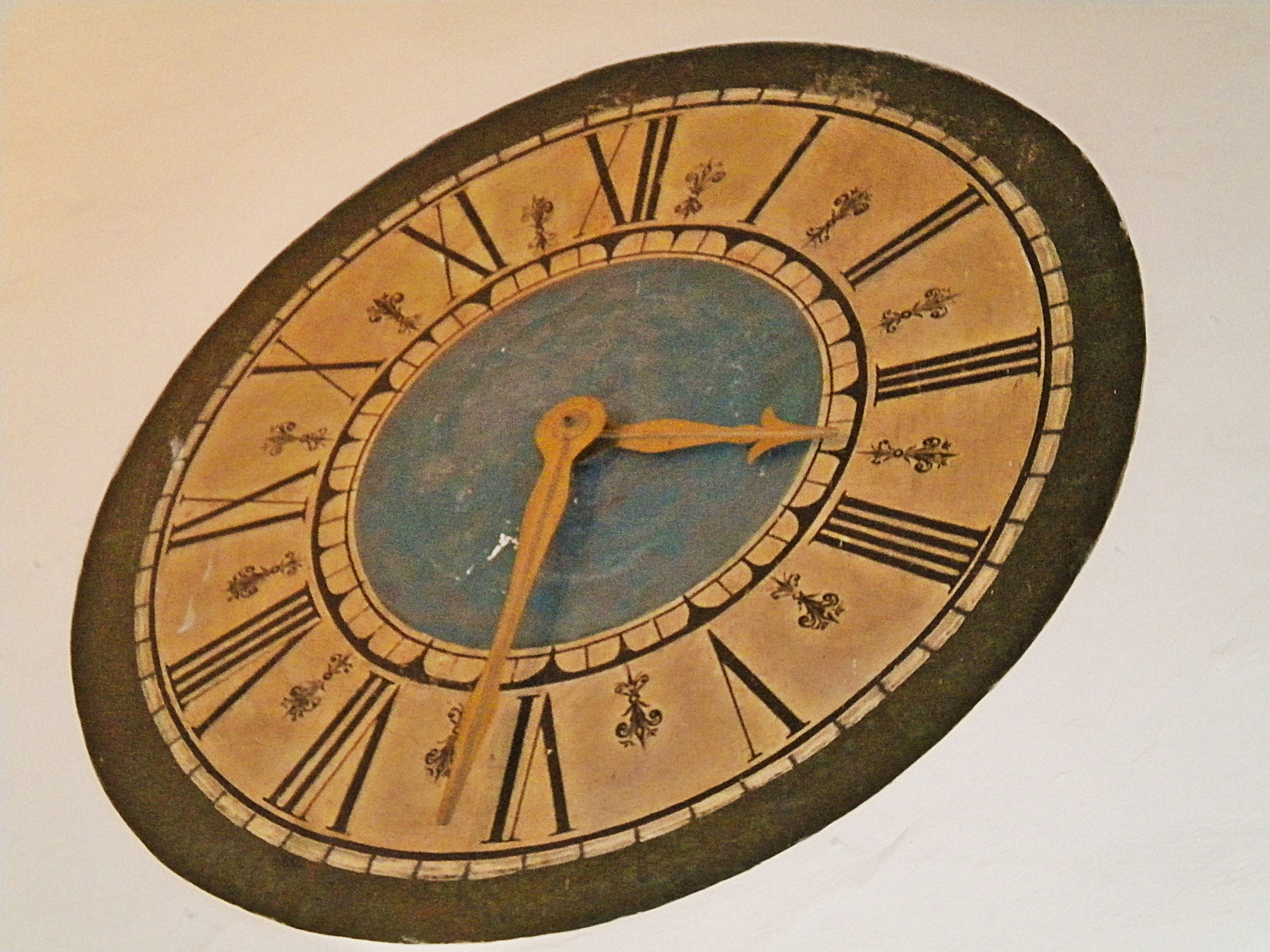
Clock in the interior

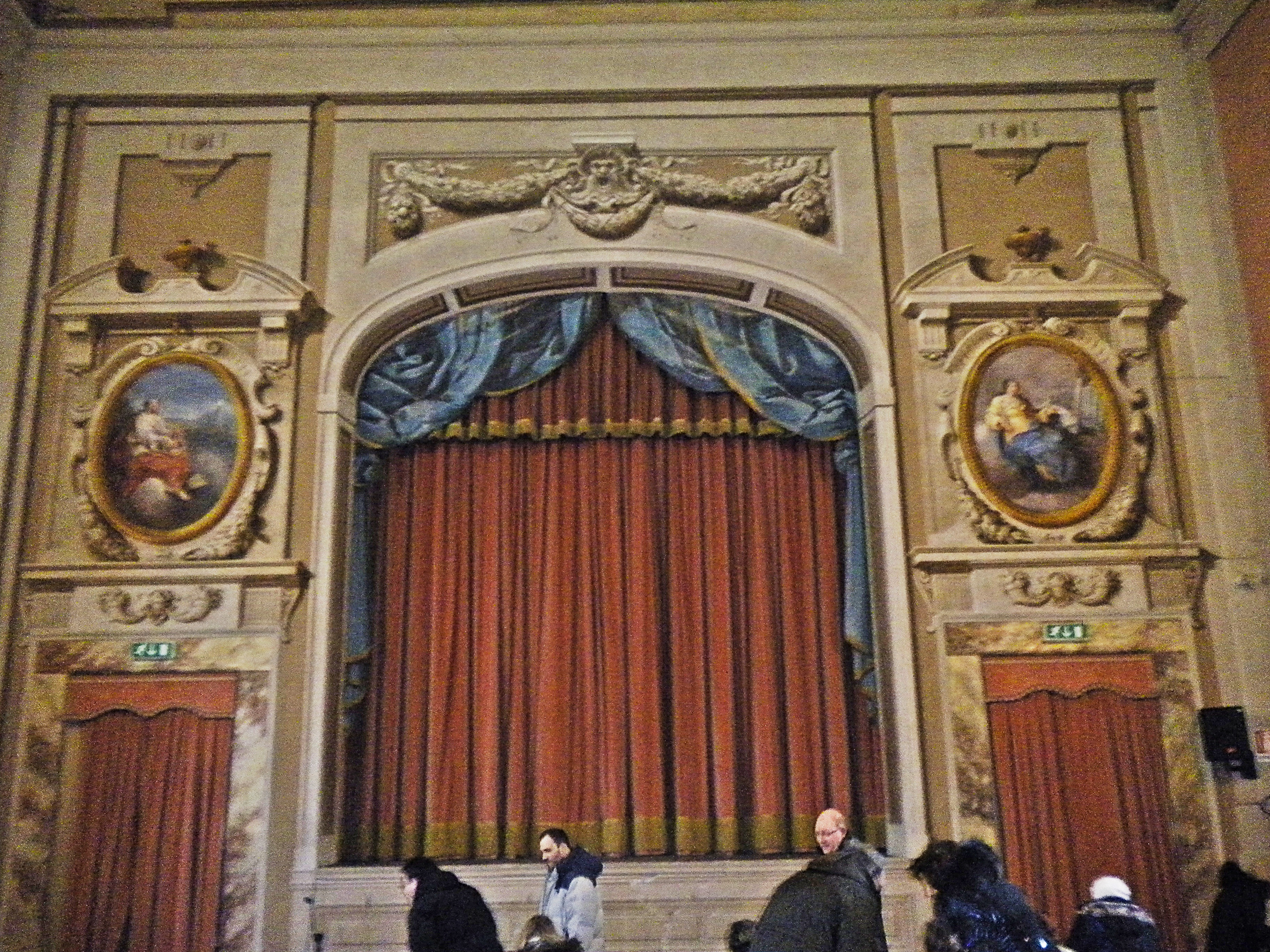
Theater Gabriele D'Annunzio

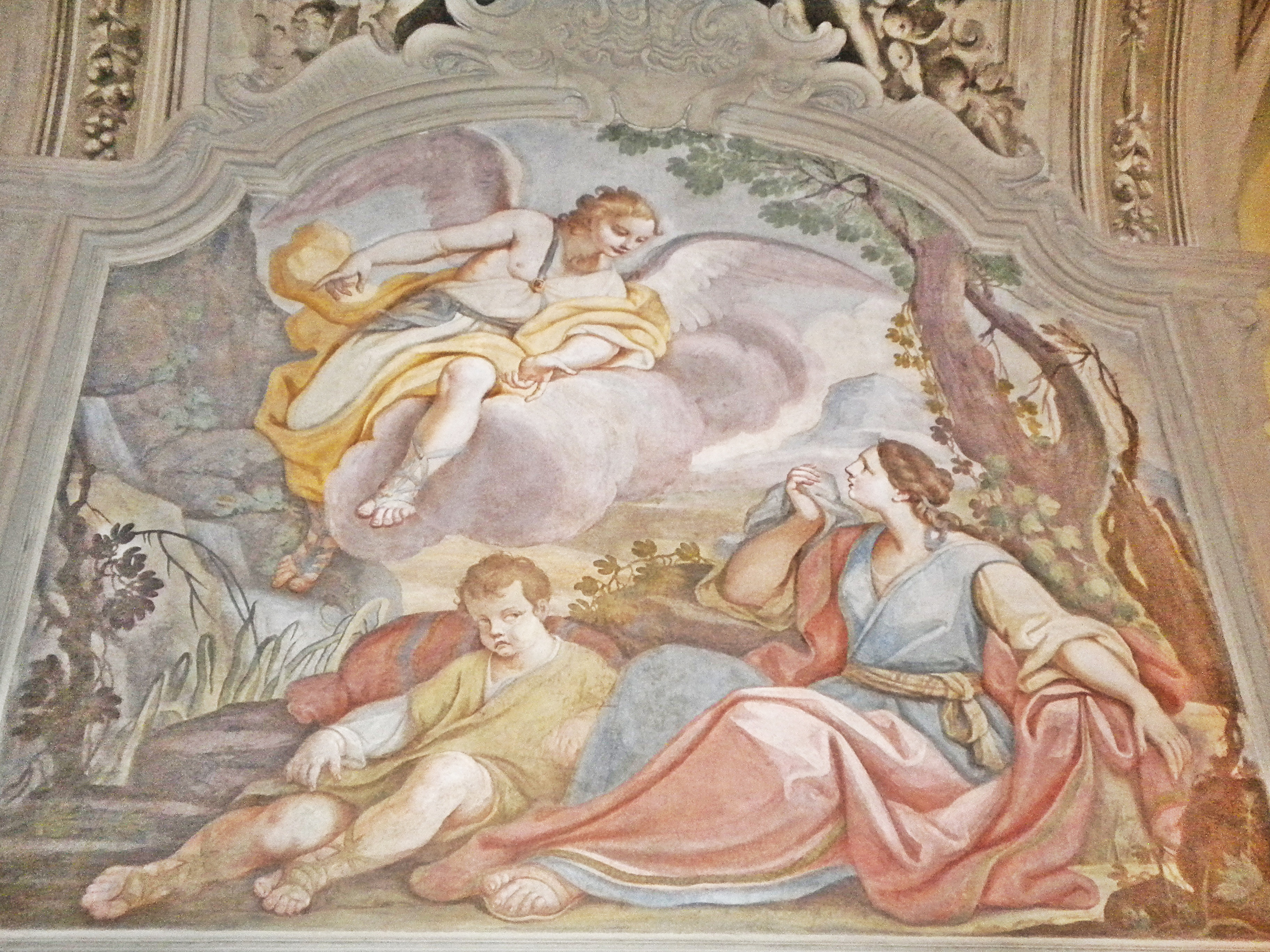
Fresco in the refectory

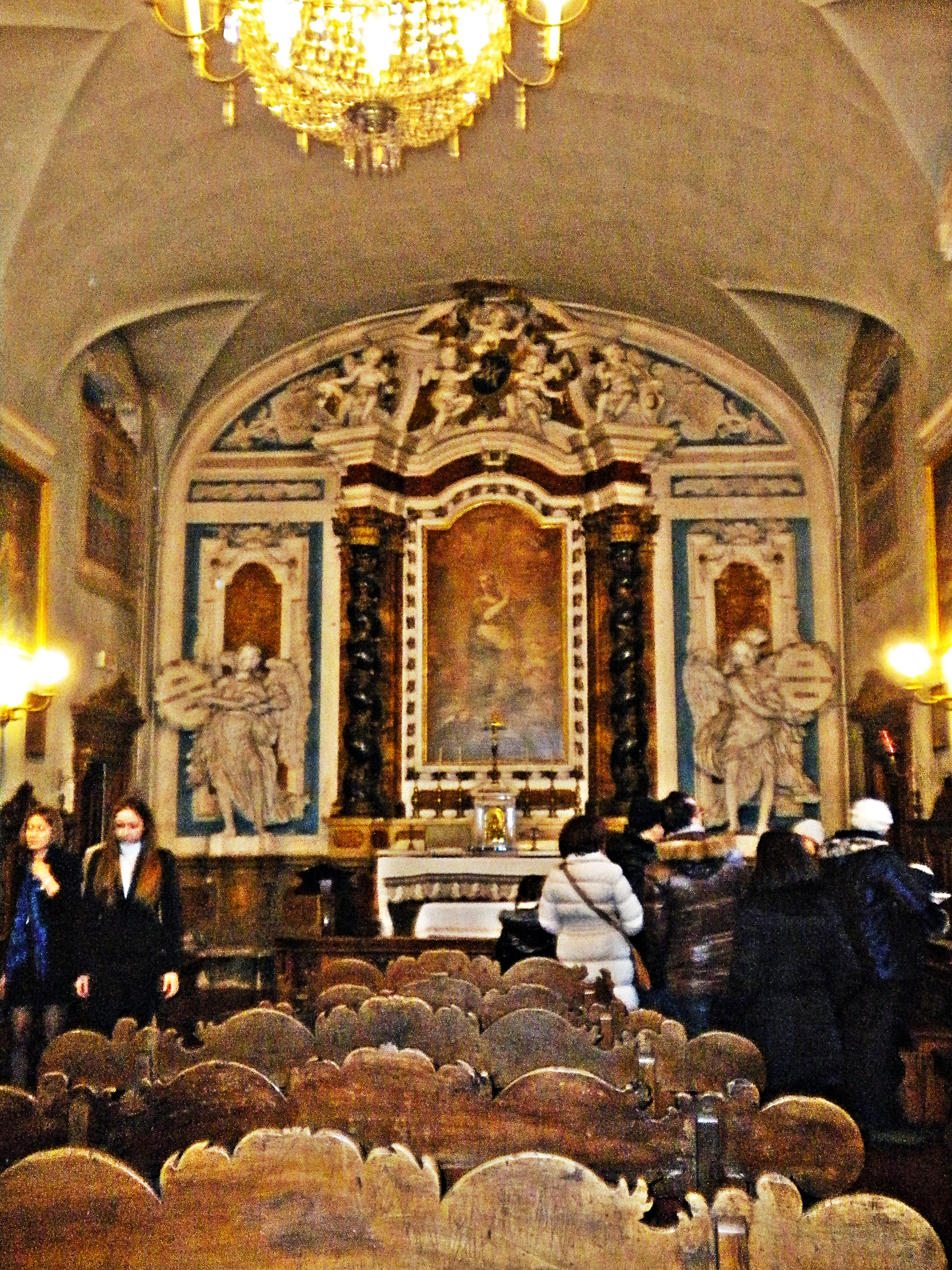
Chapel

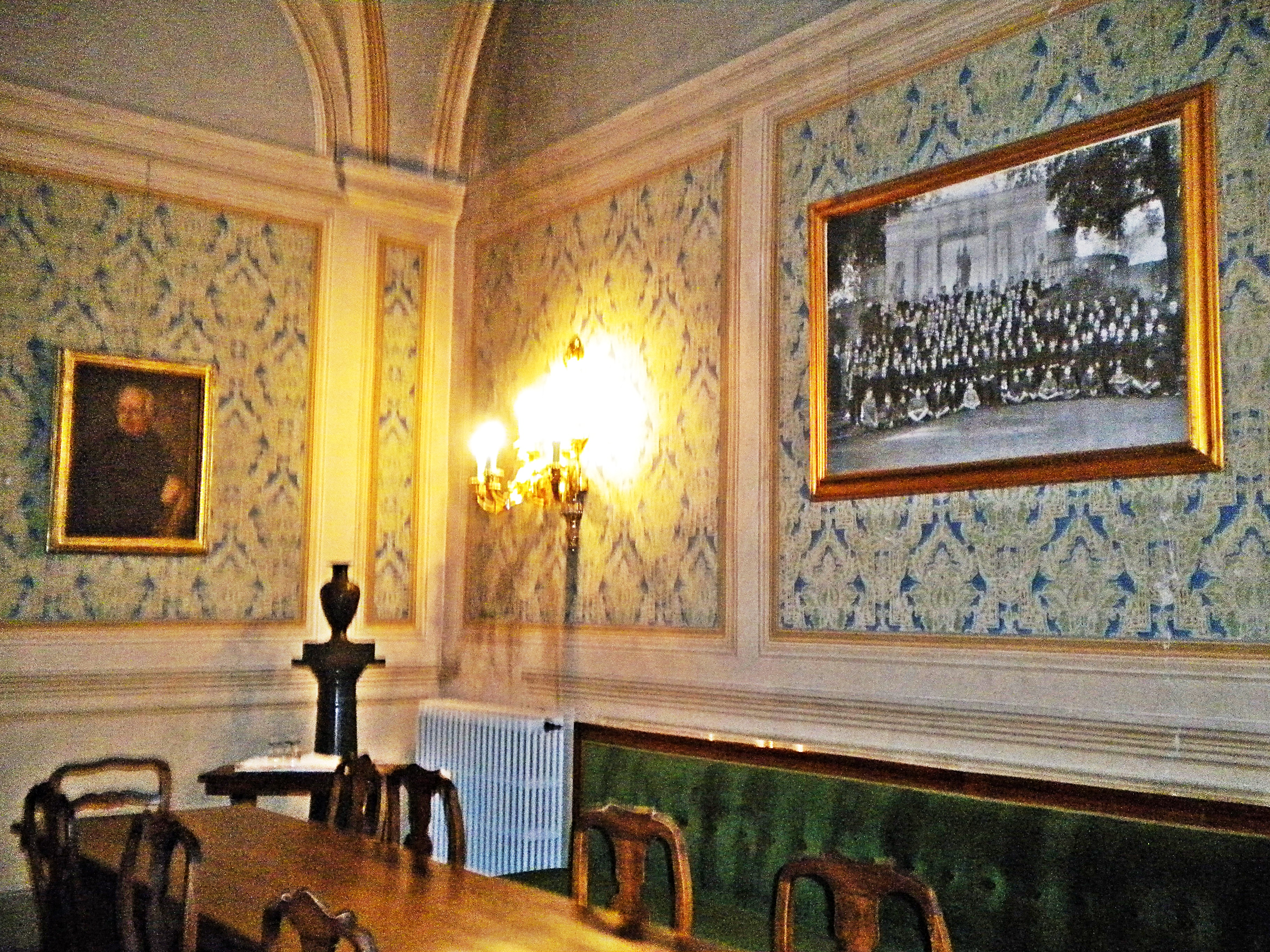
Reception room

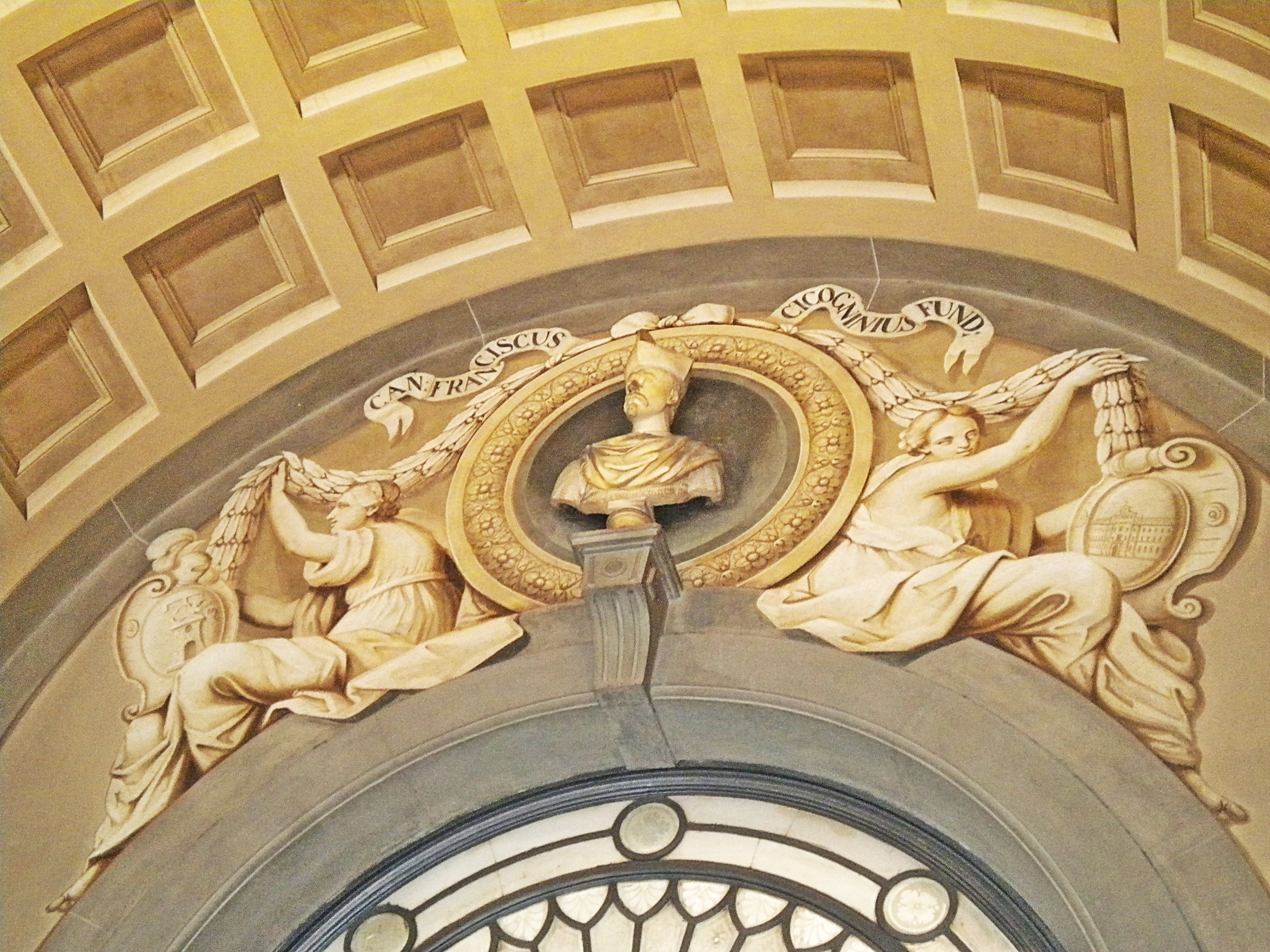
Francesco Cicognini, the founder

== See also ==
- List of schools in Italy
- List of Jesuit schools
- Liceo Classico
