= Kaputt (novel) =

1944 novel by Curzio Malaparte

- Book cover for Kaputt (1946 English language edition)
- Author: Curzio Malaparte
- Translator: Cesare Foligno
- Language: Italian
- Publisher: Editore Casella
- Publication date: 1944
- Publication place: Italy
- English publication date: 1946
- Pages: 645

Kaputt is a 1944 autobiographical novel by the Italian writer Curzio Malaparte.

== Plot ==
The book was inspired by Malaparte's experiences as a war correspondent at the Eastern Front of World War II. It presents itself as Malaparte's personal witness account of intense violence and cruelty, but the content is largely fictional.

== Reception ==
The book was an international success. Already at the publication, several European critics received the book's narrator as a fictionalised author persona, and the book as an attempt from Malaparte to position himself after Italy's defeat and his own past as a fascist sympathiser. When the English translation was published in 1946, Kirkus Reviews received it as a true account and called it "a subtly brilliant piece of writing" where Malaparte is "whipping the sensibilities to a sharp awareness of the degradation of Europe, of the utter collapse of morality, integrity, and so on".

== Translations ==
The book was translated into Lithuanian by Tomas Venclova.
