= Daz Black =

English YouTuber (born 1985)

- Born: 7 August 1985 (age 41); Hastings, East Sussex, England
- Occupations: YouTuber; actor; comedian; film director; screenwriter; producer

YouTube information
- Channel: Daz Games
- Years active: 2013–present
- Genres: Let's Play; comedy; vlog
- Subscribers: 9.55 million
- Views: 3.39 billion
- Last updated: 25 October 2026
- Website: Official website

Daz Black (born 7 August 1985), known online as Daz Games, is an English social media personality. His content, made for YouTube and Vine, includes comedy sketches, ghost hunting, and a diatribe against Andrew Tate. He has also appeared on the game show The Wheel, the E4 series Suped Up Set Up, and in the films Eddie the Eagle (2015), Brotherhood (2016), and Kill Ben Lyk (2018).

== Life and career ==
Daz Black was born on 7 August 1985. He grew up in Hastings, England, and worked in construction before opening his social media accounts. After opening an account on Vine in April 2013, he went viral that year for uploading "Girls With Annoying Laughs" to the platform. At the time of Vine's closure in 2017, he had over three million followers and his videos had more than a billion views, making him the most followed British creator on the app. Some of his most popular videos were his comedy sketches of Keeping Up with the Kardashians and a video titled "Happy Cloud".

Black appeared in Eddie the Eagle in 2015, and Brotherhood in August 2016. By October, he had begun uploading ghost hunting to his channel. He then appeared in the film Kill Ben Lyk in 2018 and in the music video for I Prevail's song "Gasoline" in 2019. A 2021 episode of The Wheel that featured Black as an expert was repeated in February 2022, by which time he had appeared in an episode of E4's Suped Up Set Up. A diatribe against misogynist influencer Andrew Tate that Black had uploaded to YouTube went viral that year, leading many to credit it with prompting social media platforms to delete Tate's accounts.

By 2023, Black had amassed eight million subscribers on YouTube; that year, he partnered with Alton Towers to create the AI-inspired escape room Panic. In 2024, Black announced a United States tour, spanning 23 cities across the country, including Los Angeles, Chicago and San Francisco. That November, Black co-hosted a five-and-a-half-hour Halloween themed stream for childrens' charity Rays of Sunshine, raising more than £22,000 in the process.

== Filmography ==
=== Film ===
Filmography: Film
Year	Title	Role	Notes
2015	Eddie the Eagle	Bus passenger	Uncredited
2016	Brotherhood	Chippy Staff Member	
2018	Kill Ben Lyk	Young Ben Lyk	

=== Television ===
Filmography: Television
Year	Title	Role	Production
2021	The Wheel	Celebrity expert	BBC One
2022	Suped Up Set Up	Himself	E4

== Discography ==
Discography
Year	Title	Credit	Ref.
2018	"Clickbait"	The Midnight Beast, Daz Black, Soheila	
2020	"Not My Teacher"	Daz Black, Sadikbeats	
2021	"You Are My Fire"	Lil Tribz, Daz Black	
