= List of House of Anubis characters =

The following is a list of characters from Nickelodeon live-action show House of Anubis.

== Sibuna Cast ==
=== Nina Martin ===
Nina Martin is an American girl who lived with her grandmother in the United States before moving to Anubis House in England. Nina was the leader of the group Sibuna in the first two seasons. With the help of her friends Fabian and Amber, the three manage to hold all of the other Sibunas together in one piece. She is usually caring, level-headed, clever, and fearless, but is sometimes shy.

Nina arrives at Anubis House on a scholarship from the United States on the same day Joy was hidden away by the Secret Society. She obtained a locket from Sarah (under the alias of Emily) prior to beginning her adventures in solving the mystery behind Anubis House. Joined by a few of her roommates, Nina became the leader of the Sibuna club while developing feelings for Fabian. Eventually, as she and Sibuna find the Ankh Pieces after Sarah's passing, Nina learns that she is the actually the Chosen One who can assemble the Cup of Ankh. After tricking Rufus off their backs and finally beginning a relationship with Fabian, they kiss each other right at the end of the season.

In season two, she is reunited with her friends. She unknowingly lets the spirit Senkhara loose. Senkhara tells Nina that she must find the Mask of Anubis or forfeit her life. She, along with the other Sibuna members, search for the Mask of Anubis in a secret set of tunnels beneath the House of Anubis. Senkhara burns the Mark of Anubis onto Nina's arm. Nina competes for Fabian's affections against Joy, who is determined to win Fabian back after her absence last year. When she finds the Mask of Anubis, she discovers it's missing something: the Frobisher-Smythe gem! At the library, she wears the Mask and almost enters the portal, but Eddie, who is the Osirian, banishes Senkhara from her body. In the process, Nina shoots Fabian with lightning, but Joy gets hit. She almost dies, but is saved when the Mask contains the last tear of gold and Victor puts a touch of the gold on Joy's lips. At Fabian and Nina are dancing (to the song they first danced to at the end of season 1) and he reveals that their breakup was a mistake, and they share a kiss, before being interrupted in a big hug by the rest of the gang.

In season three, Nina decides not to return to Anubis House; rather, she plans to stay at home in the U.S. with her grandmother who is ill again. To continue solving the mysteries within the house, Nina gives Eddie her locket and a letter to Fabian explaining her sudden decision not to return. Eddie takes Nina's place as Sibuna's leader.

Nina Martin is portrayed by Nathalia Ramos.

=== Fabian Rutter ===
Fabian Rutter is a resident at the House of Anubis and also Nina's on-and-off boyfriend. He is Nina's second-in-command of the Sibuna club but when Nina says it's too risky she backs out and gives Fabian the locket, however he convinces her to join again. At the end of the finale he and Nina share their first kiss (starting a relationship between them) after they are announced prom king and queen, as a couple, by Amber, who knows the two have chemistry. Fabian is shown to be attracted towards Nina throughout the season, though he never tells this to any other members of Anubis house, however he does make her known about his feelings for her, as demonstrated when he says her eyes are pretty, when he and Nina are hiding in the attic from Victor he wraps his jacket over Nina's shoulders to warm her up, or in the season finale when he calls her "beautiful." He also found it difficult to ask her to prom. He was the first to welcome Nina into the house of Anubis, and he is also shown to play the guitar. Fabian has an uncle named Ade who is running a local antique shop. Uncle Ade is the one who gives him the book "Unlocking the Eye" which helps Sibuna with the Egyptian mysteries. Fabian shares a dorm with Mick in the first season.

In Season 2, he, along with his fellow Sibuna members, search for the Mask of Anubis in the cellar of the House of Anubis, guarded by a secret set of tunnels. He is marked with the Mark of Anubis. He is forced to choose between Nina and Joy most of the time because they both want to win Fabian's affections. He is much closer to Nina and just wants to be friends with Joy (although she wants to be more than friends). He gets hexed by Senkhara and begins to lose his memory, forgetting everything and everyone. Joy, however, decided she wasn't going to put up with him and finally left him alone until after Sibuna begins the next task. Mara and Eddie find footage of Senkhara and begin to write an article about it, until Nina convinces Fabian to sweet talk them into dropping the article. Nina tells Fabian to talk to Joy and convince her not to run the article. Joy wanted Fabian to kiss her in order to not put up the article (since she's in charge of the website), but Fabian denies it because he still has feelings for Nina. As Nina listens to the conversation through the door, she discovers that Fabian still has feelings for her. Although he and Joy would never be together, Fabian cares for her deeply, as with all his friends, and when Joy briefly dies, Fabian breaks down in tears screaming until Joy is given tears of gold. In the season finale, he and Nina have one last dance, and they kiss, implying that they are back together. Then, the rest of the gang appears and they celebrate.

In season 3, Fabian becomes upset after finding out that Nina will not be returning. He finds a letter that Eddie gave him from Nina saying why she won't come back, along with that it says that they should break up. He along with Amber, Patricia, and Alfie reform Sibuna and try to figure out what Victor's bracelet is for. After Amber leaves for fashion school, he, Patricia, and Alfie team up with Eddie and KT and try to stop a great evil to be awaken which is Robert Frobisher-Smythe who was cursed in 1922. He becomes Frobisher's fourth sinner of Pride when Frobisher tricks him, making him evil. He, along with Patricia trick Eddie and K.T. into finding the last piece of the staff. In the end, he is brought back to normal.

Fabian Rutter is portrayed by Brad Kavanagh.

=== Eddie Miller ===
Eddie Miller, also known as Edison Sweet is the new student from America who joins the cast in season two.

When he first arrives at the school, Patricia bumps into him and she talks for a while so he calls her "Yacker". Because he calls her "Yacker," Patricia calls Eddie "Weasel". He hides a secret from everybody, which is later revealed to be the identity of his father, Mr. Sweet (who is also the school's headmaster). Patricia finds out and she keeps it a secret, even though Eddie acted as if he couldn't trust her. Even though they are rivals, Eddie and Patricia develop feelings for one another. Eddie and Patricia share a kiss, starting a relationship between them. However, after kissing Piper by mistake, Eddie's secret of being Mr. Sweet's son is exposed via the intercom, with all the kids in the school start calling him "Sweetie Junior." In the middle of the season, Eddie and Patrica had a fight so Eddie tries to make Patrica jealous by hanging around with Mara. He also is a troublemaker. In the season finale, Eddie is revealed to be an Osirian, a descendant of the Egyptian god Osiris who is a protector of the Chosen One. Learning of this, Eddie uses his power to banish Senkhara and to save Nina.

In Season 3, Patricia and Eddie have broke up during the summer, but no one understands why; they just said it was a "mutual" decision. Nina does not return to Anubis so she gives Eddie her locket and a note to deliver to Fabian. Eddie begins to receive strange visions of the future that Nina never experienced, the first anticipating the arrival of the new student KT Rush. KT begins to feel uncomfortable when Eddie is constantly interrogating her about her moon key and her grandfather, but they eventually begin to bond together. Eddie helps KT search for the door that the key unlocks, accidentally discovering that the history teacher Miss Denby also has a key. After sneaking into Miss Denby's house, Eddie and KT find the tank containing the sleeping Robert Frobisher-Smythe. When Amber leaves the school due to a conspiracy involving Victor's ceremonial bracelet, she initiates Eddie and KT into Sibuna. Eddie is unanimously chosen to become the new leader of Sibuna, in place of Nina. They work together to stop the teachers from performing Robert's awakening ceremony incorrectly and causing him to become evil. He often comforts KT when she gets emotional, much to the dismay of Patricia. Once Robert begins collecting sinners at the gatehouse, Patricia and Eddie become a couple once again. Things go awry when Patricia discovers a love letter written to Eddie. In order to make him jealous, she earns the affection of Eddie's rival, Ben Reed. Eddie makes things right with Patricia while desperately trying to defeat Ben (whom he calls "Benji") in the school's dodgeball tournament. Anubis House wins the tournament, and Eddie patches things up with Ben. Later, he is devastated to discover that the Sibuna members had betrayed him. He is tricked into completing the Staff of Osiris, which Robert steals in order to open the portal for Ammut's arrival. Eddie and KT seek the help of Willow when they have no one else to turn to. Harriet Denby, Miss Denby's sister, gives them advice to help them restore Robert to his peaceful state. She advises them to collect both keys together at the base of the staff. Eddie and KT complete the task, defeating Ammut, and saving the school from total destruction. He and Patricia make up and reaffirm their feelings for each other.

Not long afterwards, around the time of the students' graduation, Eddie meets the new girl, Sophia. At their field trip to the museum, Eddie, Dexter, and Sophia discover the Touchstone of Ra, an ancient artifact required to complete the Pyramid of Ra. When Mr. Sweet finds out that one of the students stole the artifact, it is confiscated by Victor. After overhearing the teachers' plans, Sibuna gets on the case, opting Sophia and Mara to join them. Eddie later realizes that Sophia is not who she seems, as she plans to build the pyramid herself. Sibuna teams up with Victor to stop Sophia from completing the Pyramid of Ra. In the aftermath of the confrontation, Eddie loses his Osirian powers.

Eddie is portrayed by Burkely Duffield.

=== Patricia Williamson ===
Patricia Williamson is a resident of Anubis House, a head-strong, witty, goth tomboy who thinks her way out of things and will help her friends out of situations that they can't get out of themselves.

At the beginning of the series, after her best friend Joy is removed by the Secret Society who cover up her history in the school, Patricia went to great lengths to find her. Patricia originally believed Nina to be connected to Joy's disappearance, acting vicious, cold, and dark towards her. She met with the mysterious private investigator Dr. Renee Zeldman (later revealed to be Rufus Zeno), who convinces her that he can help find Joy. After witnessing Victor dragging away an unconscious Rufus (Patricia's only link to Joy), she joins Sibuna, learning that Anubis House's secret is connected to Joy's disappearance. In the end, she and Nina clear their misunderstandings.

In the second season, though annoyed by Joy's schemes to win Fabian from Nina, Patricia begins to get close to the new student Eddie in a love-hate relationship. Patricia then rejoined Sibuna to help her friends find the Mask of Anubis, getting marked by the Mark of Anubis before her twin sister Piper arrived. Soon Patricia asked Piper to stay, which led to even more drama. Patricia sent Piper on a date with Eddie to impress Mr. Sweet but soon Eddie mistakes her for Patricia and kisses her. Mr. Sweet, who is secretly Eddie's dad, finds out and soon accepts her to stay at his school. Patricia finds out that she kissed Eddie and was mad at him for not telling her about it. He thought she was just mad at him because he kissed her sister. She soon forgave him but, she sees that Mara and Eddie have spent a lot of time together as ghost hunters. She even found them asleep in the cellar coming out of the Frobisher Library, and they mistake her voice for the ghost. Mara is only his friend, but he tries to make Patricia jealous every time she sees them together. He later, while on their blind-date, admits this and adds that it's because it shows that she likes him back. At the end of season 2 she and Eddie begin their relationship.

In the third season, Patricia and Eddie have broken up during the summer and she is beginning to dislike the new girl, KT. She becomes the second sinner of jealousy when Miss Denby tricks her. To cover up her treason, she destroys the phonograph and frames KT. She is returned to normal when Ammut is destroyed. She and Eddie later reconcile and begin their relationship once again.

Patricia and Fabian are the only two characters to appear in every episode of the series.

Patricia Williamson is portrayed by Jade Ramsey.

=== Amber Millington ===
Amber Millington is a resident of the House of Anubis and one of Nina's best friends. She is a very girly, sweet, beautiful, naive girl with a flair for fashion and a strong, unbreakable bond with the group. Amber is very fashion forward - she reads dozens of gossip magazines, owns tons of dresses, shoes and jewelry, and decorates her side of her dorm with all things pink. Amber's father is hinted to be a successful business man and very rich, as she shops all the time and in the beginning of the first season, she talks on her phone with her father, saying she wants a bigger allowance because she saw a beautiful pair of shoes. Amber is hinted to be Nina's third-in-command, as she is the only one Nina could trust next to Fabian. At the beginning of the series she roomed with Mara until the love triangle between them and Mick forces her to room with Nina, becoming one of Nina's best friends and practically her sister. Amber would ultimately play a role as not only one of three founding members of the Sibuna Club, but also giving their group its name and membership gesture. Eventually, after making her peace with Mara and letting Mick go, Amber is taken by Alfie to the prom dance.

In Season 2, she searches for the Mask of Anubis with Nina and Fabian while dealing with Alfie as her boyfriend, Patricia joins the gang as well. Eventually, Amber too is branded with the Mark of Anubis before being hexed by Senkara to grow old at an alarming rate. In the beginning of Season 2, Amber doesn't really like Alfie. In the finale, Amber asks Alfie if they should try "Amfie" or "Alber" again and they do.

In Season 3, Amber seems to have a small role, although she is still part of Sibuna. She ends up being locked in the tank room, while Sibuna is investigating at the Gate House and she finds Robert Frobisher-Smythe in the tank, although unaware it is him. She is then missing at the school as her father makes an appearance. She is then discovered in the tank room by Ms. Denby. Her father ultimately decides Amber will no longer be attending the school, and will instead go to fashion school in New York City. Although, Amber reveals, to Sibuna and KT, she gave the teachers a fake bracelet and gives the real one back to Sibuna, she then leaves the school and says that it might be a good idea to reform Sibuna, and nominates Fabian to be the leader.

Amber Millington is portrayed by Ana Mulvoy Ten.

=== Alfie Lewis ===
Alfie Lewis is a resident of the House of Anubis, roommates with Jerome and often goofs around with him. He is always getting into trouble, and frequently wears some kind of animal mask or head. He has a huge crush on Amber. He and Jerome often tease Patricia for her obsession about finding Joy, such as when Jerome brought Patricia into their room and tried to convince her that they could see where Joy is through his fake crystal ball. While he and Jerome attempt to get back at 7th and 8th graders for getting them put under probation, Alfie ends up trapped in the cellar where he is traumatized by witnessing a Society ritual prior to Sibuna finding him in a catatonic state.

After leaving the hospital, Alfie found one of the puzzle pieces and believed it to be an alien artifact. Patricia manages to get the puzzle piece back from him, with Sibuna playing off his alien delusion so he would not get caught up in their antics. However, after he attacks Mrs. Andrews on the assumption that she's an alien, Patricia and Fabian are forced to tell Alfie about the treasure and the quest before being made a member of Sibuna. While dealing with Jerome using him to give intel on the club's activities to Rufus, Alfie tries to ask Amber out to the prom under the Internet alias "King Tut" . After Rufus drinks the fake elixir from the Cup of Ankh, Alfie pretends to die to convince the villain that he won. And after Rufus leaves Anubis House Alfie got up and told the gang he was fine, but Amber cared for him secretly and so Alfie thought that meant that they were officially a couple, but which he soon finds out is that in Season 2 Amber reveals to him to become her official boyfriend he has to go through lot of tests that Amber gives him which were complete nonsense.

In season 2, learning that Amber was having second thoughts of being his girlfriend despite what she said when she thought he was going to die, Alfie goes to extreme lengths and doing ridiculous tasks to become her official boyfriend. He tries to break up with her after a while, but Amber told him that she decides when they get to break up. Later on in the episode, Amber does break up with Alfie. Alfie later gets hexed by Senkhara with an age regression curse. He gets back to normal and helps with the tasks. He starts to fall in love with Patrica's sister, Piper. But when Piper leaves the Anubis house he was not happy, but what Piper explained to him is that all she needed is a break from the music academy and told him she may visit once more. After some trailing events, including defeating evil, Amber asks if they should give "Amfie" another go and they do.

Alfie Lewis is portrayed by Alex Sawyer.

=== Joy Mercer ===
Joy Mercer is a resident of the House of Anubis who is known for complex personality. Joy is quirky, creative, bubbly, artsy, and dramatic, always demanding the spotlight and loving to be the center of attention. She is a bit of an oddball and loves joking around. However, Joy is a very debatable and complicated character, she is neither black or white, nor good or bad; she is a gray character. She has many sides to her that no one else sees. On the outside, she can appear tough and snarky, but on the inside she is a sensitive girl who is misunderstood by her peers. She is known to have a dangerous streak about her. She is very unpredictable and has a sneaky attitude with a strong determination that constantly gets her into trouble. Joy has been rejected and hurt many times by the people she has loved, which has caused a subconscious distrust of her friends and herself. She herself has never been happy or loved by a guy in a way she's wanted, not once. However, her and Jerome are getting closer mostly because they both understand each other's feelings, as where no one else does. Deep down Joy wants to protect her friends and the people she loves, but her actions may not always be the right way to go about things. In the end, Joy just needs to be loved by someone who won't hurt her because of who she is.

In season 1, she was taken out of the school and into the Society's care on the day that Nina arrived at the school, and all history of her enrollment removed. That worried her best friend, Patricia, who went through great lengths to find her. It was revealed that Joy was believed by the Society to be the Chosen One, the only person able to reassemble the Cup of Ankh. However, though she was born on the 7th day of the 7th month, Joy was actually born at 7 PM and that she could not restore the Cup of Ankh.

In season 2, returning to Anubis House as a student, Joy makes it her goal to become Fabian's girlfriend, severing his relationship with Nina by kissing him while wearing her mask at the ball. Later, Joy tells Nina that stealing someone's boyfriend isn't something she usually does, and offers that if Nina still wants to be with Fabian, she's okay with it. However, despite washing her hands of Fabian while he was under Senkhara's forgetfulness curse, Joy is determined to stop him and Nina from getting back together by making up an article about the latter and posting it on the school news website under Mara's anonymous blog. Once Mara is revealed to the true anonymous poster (JackJackal), Joy becomes an outcast. Though Joy later is made a temporary member to help in the senet challenge to save Nina, she instead follows the Sibunas into the tunnels when they decide to play Victor into guiding them through the senet board. Senkhara takes over Nina. Joy gets hit by a fireball, thrown by Nina/Senkhara, while trying to protect Fabian. Joy dies but is brought back to life by the tears of gold that Victor put on her lip. At the season finale, after a near death experience, Joy becomes one of Nina's friends. Since she was a big part of the mystery in season 1, she joined Sibuna and help them find the Mask of Anubis.

In season 3, Joy is unsettled when it is revealed Nina won't be attending school, fearing something similar happened to Nina as it did to her. Joy started up the old Sibuna again in the beginning of season 3, but ended up quitting a few episodes after. She is a descendant, as her grandmother was on the trip. It was revealed that Joy has a fear of robes after her experiences in the first and third season. Joy is often in the middle of the mysteries that go on in House of Anubis.

Joy Mercer is portrayed by Klariza Clayton.

=== Mara Jaffray ===
Mara is thought of in the first season as a normal geek, or "The Beauty With the Brains," but by the time it comes to the second season she is more involved with Jerome's mystery, about the gem of Anubis that was due to be returned into the shield at the School, when Mara helps Jerome she is also helping Jerome's sister Poppy, with information about John Clarke (Jerome and Poppy's Dad) she later finds out about Mick's return for a few days, she decides to go out with him during his return, but Poppy asks her to go to John's hearing, this is due to Jerome being captured by Rufus Zeno, after the hearing John is released from Jail, Poppy announces to Jerome and John that she is leaving.

In Season Three, Mara breaks up with Jerome over a silly mistake and he moves on to Willow, Mara forgives him saying that she was wrong about the break-up in the first place, but Joy tells Willow and Mara that Jerome is cheating on them, Joy eventually ends up having to date Jerome, but when they break up due to Mara's Revenge Plot, Joy ends up getting upset and ending her friendship with Mara, Willow ends up sorting this out when she is heartbroken by the Alfie Sinner, meanwhile all five sinners have been captured, Patricia ends up turning Mara, Willow and Joy into Sinners, but this doesn't last long due to Eddie and KT's victory against RFS.

In Touchstone of Ra, Mara finds out about Sibuna, and begins to unravel the mystery alongside Fabian but she remains unaware of Rufus or any of Sibuna's past, apart from that of Ra, and the evil new girl in Anubis House (Sophia) and asks Fabian about some hieroglyphics, he asks Sibuna who had actually touched the stone and tells them "Anyone who has ever touched the touchstone turns to stone" Mara later almost becomes the sacrifice, but if this happened then Victor, Fabian, Eddie and Alfie would turn to stone, also anybody else who touched the stone, The Osirian dies to stop Ra and Banish her before she destroyed the world, meanwhile Victor agrees to leave Anubis House, Trudy and Mr Sweet eventually miss him, Mara talks to Fabian at the end of the special and agrees to share the coin of Ra as the medal, when she put it on and the Touchstone was built it took her soul.

Mara Jaffray is portrayed by Tasie Lawrence.

=== KT Rush ===
KT Rush, known as Kara Tatianna, is in season 3. She is the new girl from America, that Patricia feels is supposed to replace Nina. She was sent by her grandfather to protect everyone from a great evil that is about to be awoken in the Anubis house. KT is already starting to get on Mara's good side while Patricia thinks that Eddie, her ex-boyfriend has a crush on her. KT runs into Eddie a bunch of times in episode 1 of season 3, and which Eddie keeps trying to talk to her about seeing her in his dream but ends up upsetting her when he talks about her grandfather. At the end of episode 1 Eddie touches Kt's key and has a frightening dream and freaks out. He sits on the stairs and she asks him if he's okay. She becomes a member of Sibuna but later on they think she is the sinner and kick her out. Also she is the great-granddaughter of Robert Frobisher-Smythe. She has a cheery personality and has a unique friendship with Joy.

KT Rush is played by Alexandra Shipp.

=== Jerome Clarke ===
Jerome Clarke is a resident of Anubis House and Alfie's best friend/roommate. His high intelligence and degree of cunning allow him to orchestrate pranks on other students which sometimes go too far. Jerome has attained boarding school since he was five, which caused his trouble-making antics but is actually a deep person with abandonment issues. He has some feelings for Mara, becoming very frustrated when she and Mick start dating. When he learns of Alfie joining Sibuna, leaving him out of the loop, Jerome gets into contact with Rufus and becomes his informant using what he gets from Alfie. But once Alfie learns the truth, Jerome finds himself in mortal danger as he steals one of his friend's Ankh Pieces to keep Rufus from killing him. He eventually joins Sibuna as a temporary member for protection when he accepts to help them stop Rufus.

During the second season, avoiding his sister Poppy when she starts attending his school, Jerome is forced by Mara to help Poppy reconnect with their father. Finding his father, managing to make his peace with him, Jerome learns of his father's action of stealing the gem of the Frobisher-Smythe Shield, a paddleball trophy, and agrees to help his father restore it to its rightful place with Mara helping him. Eventually, Jerome gets the gem and wins the Frobisher-Smythe Shield back from a rival boarding school. But when Jasper steals the gem from the Frobisher Shield, Jerome learns of Collector and his true identity as Rufus. Later, he gets captured by Rufus. He is then rescued by Alfie, Patricia, and Fabian. In the season finale, Jerome confesses to Mara his love and began a relationship with her.

He has been involved with Sibuna many times; being a Sibuna member in season 1, an unofficial Sibuna member in season 2, and knowing partially about the mystery in season 3 (as he was forced to participate in the awakening ceremony).

Jerome Clarke is portrayed by Eugene Simon.

== Other House of Anubis Cast ==
=== Mick Campbell ===
Mick Campbell is a former resident of the House of Anubis. His father was a doctor although he was more attached to sports than academics. At the beginning of the series he was dating Amber but broke up with her when she could not attend any of their "dates" because of Sibuna. He gained a crush on Mara and kisses her in one episode, however he told Jerome and Alfie that he was not interested, and made it sound like he thought she was boring. This caused her to take on a bad girl personality, and become set on ruining him. He kisses her again during a scene in the school play, but they continue kissing even after the curtain is down. After this they become boyfriend and girlfriend. He thought he would get expelled because Mara took pictures of him and Ms. Robinson training together, cropped and doctored the photos to look like the two were involved with each other, and sent them to Mr. Sweet. He almost was expelled until Mara came in and confessed, saving Mick. However he breaks up with her for it, saying that what she did was sick. He forgives her after she writes him a letter apparently saying sorry 17 times, but they decide to stay just friends. Soon after, he leaves for his sports scholarship tryout. He comes back later, and asks Mara out. She says yes and they become an official couple. He supported Mara all the way during the school election. He bribed Robbie, the ballot counter, for school rep with a date with Patricia. Mara eventually won legitimately because Robbie forgot to put the votes in the ballot box, which he left in his book bag. Mara still broke up with him out of anger, but forgave him when he performed his "Apology Cheer" with pom-poms, while wearing a 'Mara I'm Sorry' T-shirt. They made up when they were both doing the dishes, and they started a water fight. He starts taking dance lessons from Amber to prepare to the prom. Near the end of season 1 he(along with Mara and Amber) tried to get Fabian to confess to Nina that he likes her. He and Mara are an on again-off again couple. He goes to prom with Mara at the end of season 1. Mick is not part of the Sibuna club, along with Mara, Jerome & Joy.

In season 2, Mick continues his relationship with Mara. When Mick's dad moves to Australia, he transfers to a boarding school there, and is forced to end his relationship with Mara, until he and Mara decide to have a long-distance relationship in House of Heist/House of Alibis. However, returning in the season finale for a visit, Mick sees that he and Mara are not meant to be together when she finally admits her true feelings towards Jerome.

He is the only main character to never know anything about the mystery, or Sibuna.

Mick Campbell is portrayed by Bobby Lockwood.

=== Willow Jenks ===
Willow Jenks, is in season 3. She is a new girl who began as living in another house but moved to Anubis House when Amber leaves for fashion school. She is a quirky red head with blond highlights who idolizes Amber Millington. In S3 EP1 she always wanted to share with Amber because she's so amazing. One day in Later, Willow finds out she is Joy's long lost cousin. She helps Sibuna with Joy's riddle "In The Place Of Rest, You Will Succeed". At the end of season 3, Willow helped Sibuna (KT and Eddie). She also dates Alfie Lewis.

Willow Jenks is played by Louisa Connolly-Burnham.

== Recurring prominent ==
=== Victor Rodenmaar Jr. ===
Victor Rodenmaar Jr. is the caretaker of Anubis House and is revealed to be a tragic villain as the series progresses, driven to madness by his thirst for eternal life and the workings of his cold hearted father, Victor Rodenmaar Sr. As a child in the 1920s, Victor befriended Sarah Frobisher-Smythe during her childhood on his father's order to find the location of the Cup of Ankh. But eventually, Victor becomes as cruel as his father and used the Elixir of Life to extend his life, which made him biologically in his nineties. After his father died of unknown circumstances, taking the secret of making the Elixir with him, Victor is forced to take over leading the Society that his father created. He owns a stuffed raven (Corbierre) that he keeps in his office.

During the first season, having Joy be removed from the Anubis House under the notion that she was the Chosen One, Victor went to great lengths to conceal her being there. At that time, before learning the truth, Nina and Fabian believed Victor to young Sarah's guardian after her parents were killed. But Nina and Fabian later find an old photograph of Victor as a child alongside his father, whom he resembles in everyway. Eventually, Victor finds Sarah in the rest home and makes a final attempt to get her to reveal the Cup's location, only for her to instead forgive him for what his father intended to do. Though Sarah died soon after, Victor learns that the kids have been finding Ankh pieces and manages to get his hand on them and Joy to begin the ritual. But when Joy is unable to assemble the cup, Victor dismisses the other Society members. When Rufus Zeno beats him to the Cup of Ankh, a completely desolate Victor learns that how the Cup of Ankh's power works before being forced to watch the item be seemingly destroyed. After the Chosen Hour passes, and learning what remained of the Elixir of Life has been destroyed, Victor slowly ascends the stairwell to his study, utterly crushed and defeated.

As revealed in the second season, Victor spent the entire summer trying to recreate the recipe for the Elixir of Life, eventually forced to obtain the Book of Isis. However, the Society being nearly dissolved forces Victor to act on his own while obtaining help from Vera, unaware of her own agenda in Anubis House.

Victor is given a much more sympathetic role in the season two finale. Despite his thirst for the Mask, he gives the tears of gold to Joy to revive her. Weeping at the loss of his last chance at eternal life, Nina gives him his father's ring. He is last seen in his study, opening the ring to reveal the final tear of gold, bringing the possibility of eternal life back. The second season ends with Victor holding the tear, his thirst for eternal life reawoke, leaving an open door for a third season. During episode 1 in season 3, Victor marks a date in a book in which he was to meet the Seeker and the Keeper. When he arrives he finds Eric Sweet there and warns him to leave, and Mr. Sweet reveals to him that he is the Seeker and Victor reveals that he is The Great Enabler. He becomes the first sinner for Robert Frobisher Smythe in season 3. Also in the Touchstone of Ra he helps Sibuna and then leaves Anubis house.

Victor Rodenmaar Jr. is portrayed by Francis Magee.

=== Trudy Rehmann ===
Trudy Rehmann is the housemother of the House of Anubis, one of the few people to be unaware of the mystery and the events. Trudy is a nice person, and she helps the students when she needs to and as much as she can, even small problems. She seems to have a crush on Fabian's Uncle Ade. In season 2, she has a short relationship with Fabian's godfather, Jasper. She gets a new job and is replaced by the new house mother, Vera, whom Trudy did not trust and realize was up to no good. She then finds out that Vera stole the ox bell and Vera then kidnaps her, placing her in Rufus's custody before she sent a message to the school in code saying "Help me." It is the revealed in "House of Sabotage/House of Nine Lives" that The Collector wanted Trudy because he thought she knew something about the dollhouse, but when she doesn't give enough information, The Collector decides to get rid of her, and also loses her memory escaping Rufus, but she slowly regains it as well as having strange dreams. However, her mind was altered by Rufus Zeno's memory box as he visited her posing as a memory doctor and used that opportunity to have Trudy forget any connection she had to the mystery. In Season 3, she returns as the housekeeper again after knowing that Vera is gone.

Trudy Rehmann is portrayed by Mina Anwar.

=== Eric Sweet ===
Eric Sweet is the principal of the school and is also seen teaching Chemistry class. He is shown to have feelings for Ms. Andrews. He is strict but understanding, sometimes called "Sweety Sweet" and "Ol Sweety". In season 2, he has given up on the search for the Elixir of Life though goes along with Victor's plan to bring the Egyptian exhibit to the school for its benefit. He is also Eddie's father, something that both he and Eddie tried to keep quiet. However, Patricia eventually finds out and in "House of Tricks/House of Whispers" she accidentally tells the entire school when she turns on the PA system. At the end of Season 2, Mr. Sweet reveals to Eddie that the real reason he kept him away for so long was because Eddie was actually the Osirian. During the beginning of episode of 1 the new teacher Miss Denby made everyone do a Family tree project, but when Eric found out he made her cancel the project. Also at the end of the episode we learn that Victor was meeting The Seeker who ends up being Eric Sweet.

Mr. Sweet is portrayed by Paul Antony-Barber.

=== Daphne Andrews ===
Daphne Andrews is the French (and as seen in one episode, English) teacher at the school. Though one of the high-ranking members of the Society, Ms. Andrews is more concerned of her duties as a teacher with a sixth sense if something is wrong. In the second season, having seemingly abandoned the quest for eternal life, Ms. Andrews focus more on her duties as a teacher while attempting to help Trudy to find out who Vera really is by having Mara gather information. When Mara is expelled after she posted her findings outline with Vera covering her tracks, Ms. Andrews reveals to Mr. Sweet her part and offers her resignation in place of Mara's expulsion. Though Mara was able to get off the hook, wanting to wash her hands of Victor, Ms. Andrews left the school anyway to start fresh.

Mrs. Andrews is portrayed by Julia Deakin.

=== Sarah Frobisher-Smythe ===
Sarah Frosbisher-Smythe is a confused elderly woman that gave Nina the eye of Horus necklace. When she's in the middle of a conversation, she will often get into certain details and then drift off, so Nina can only get a certain amount of information from her at a time. Going by the alias of Emily Grant, she lived at a nursing home near the Anubis House. She meets Nina in the first episode when she is sitting on a bench in front of the House of Anubis. Nina brings her back to the nursing home where she lives and she gives Nina her necklace as only she can find the Cup of Ankh. Since then, Nina would visit Sarah whenever she and Sibuna needed clues. It would be later revealed that Sarah's parents were apparently murdered by Victor's father, with Gustav and Isabel Zeno becoming her legal guardians, in order to force her to reveal the location of the Cup of Ankh as she was also a Chosen One. Eventually, having lost contact with her, Victor found Sarah in the rest home and arranged for her be taken into Anubis house. Though mistaking Victor for his father at first, Sarah regains her full memories and makes her peace with Victor before returning to the home. It would later be revealed that Sarah died later that night, leaving some of her possessions to help her find the rest of the Puzzle pieces. In death, her spirit continues to guide Nina until the Cup of Ankh is restored. In the season finale, both Sarah and her parents finally rest in peace with the Curse of Anubis being broken at long last and entrusting Nina to keep the Cup of Ankh safe.

In season 2, Sarah helps Nina on occasions with finding clues to find the Mask of Anubis through the dollhouse she owned as a little girl. Nina later learned of Sarah's nature as the previous Chosen One from Rodemnar. After Sarah's dollhouse was stolen, the dollhouse was damage and gone forever.

Sarah Frobisher-Smythe is portrayed by Rita Davies.

=== Jason Winkler ===
Jason Winkler is the drama teacher at the school. He was good-looking and understanding. He was the only one who believes Patricia about how something really bad has happened to Joy, before he had the talk with Victor about what happened with Joy. At the beginning of the series, it hinted that he likes Patricia. He found Joy's cell phone on the streets by the school by the trash cans. Mr. Winkler was concerned about Patricia, as he went to Ms. Andrew's classroom to get some information about the disappearance of Joy. However, Ms. Andrews is interrupted by Mick as he is talking to her. He later visits Mr. Sweet's office and is initially told that he would be better off not knowing about Joy, but is then told to talk to Victor. Offered a place in the Society, Mr. Winkler joins the conspiracy in return to drink from the Cup of Ankh to be saved from an incurable degenerative disease. His final fate is unknown after the ritual failed, although it is possible he has come to accept his fate. He also has a crush on Miss Robinson.

Mr. Winkler is portrayed by Jack Donnelly.

=== Rufus Zeno ===
Rufus Zeno is a former member of the Society born in the 1915 who is an Osirian, a protector of the Chosen One. However, as revealed by Victor Rodemnar Sr., Zeno let the title go to his head when he learned the truth behind the Cup of Ankh's life-giving ability. As result, Zeno betrayed the Society years prior and is now acting on his own to become immortal. Taking on the alias of Rene Zeldman, he first appeared to Patricia as a detective looking for Joy before holding her ransom. Towards the end of first season, after his attempt to have Jerome spy for him backfired, Rufus takes the Sibuna group hostage on the night of the Chosen Hour in exchange for Joy and the Elixir of Life. However, they escape with Rufus disfigured by his own poisonous insects before he gets the cup when he threatens to harm Amber. He then drinks what he thought was the elixir and leaves Anubis house, believing that he destroyed the cup.

In season 2, Patricia shows an obituary for Rufus under his alias, revealing that Rufus had apparently died. But in reality, he took on the new alias of the Collector and uses Vera to get the Mask of Anubis for him. He eventually holds Trudy hostage, though intending to dispose of her eventually. However, Jasper gives Rufus a fake Mask of Anubis so Sibuna can save Trudy. But Rufus soon learns that he has been tricked and threatens Vera to get him the real mask. After posing as a memory doctor to alter Trudy's memories, Rufus encounters Jerome while looking for Vera and abducts him as a trump. Though he eventually gets the Mask of Anubis, Rufus is revealed not to be of pure-heart to enter Aaru and instead, while possessed by Senkhara, falls into the fiery abyss with only the Mask remaining behind.

Rufus Zeno is portrayed by Roger Barclay.

=== Senkhara ===
Senkhara is a spirit of a forgotten ruler from Ancient Egypt who was imprisoned for centuries within the Cup of Ankh, until being freed unintentionally by Nina in the second season. She wants the Mask of Anubis for Nina to put it on so she could enter the afterlife and reign as a goddess once again. Her personality and history are both shrouded in mystery, though was hinted in the Song of Hathor to have played a role in the death of Tutankhamun and that only her diadem was found in her tomb. Prior to her name being revealed, Senkhara commands Nina and the rest of Sibuna to find the Mask, rewarding them with the promise of "tears of gold" while branding them with the Mark of Anubis so they would all die if they fail her. Senkhara also has the ability to curse people by words and black magic. She can age, de-age, and cast hexes through "The Power of Ma'at." She also seems to possess a sadistic sense of humor, but is not above helping Sibuna to forward her own goals, such as when she begrudgingly provides them with the Song of Hathor to complete one of the tunnel tasks.

In the finale, Senkhara's goals are revealed to becoming a goddess by using Nina's body to enter Aaru, the "field of golden rushes" where the gods dwell. Though she considered finding the Osirian instead as a tool to find the mask and become her vessel, Senkhara goes with her plan to possess Nina, revealing her goal to enter Aaru. However, Eddie, revealed to be the Osirian, exorcizes Senkhara as Rufus takes the mask. As a result, Senkhara possesses the unworthy Rufus and they are both dragged into the lake of fire in the Duat.

Senkhara is portrayed by Sophiya Haque.

=== Jasper Choudhary ===
Jasper Choudhary is Fabian's godfather, originally looking after Ade's antique shop while he was away. However, getting caught up with the Collector who threatens harm on Fabian, Jasper is forced to help Vera find the Mask of Anubis. Managing to become the curator at the school's Egypt Exhibit, Jasper arranged it that Trudy would work under him while Vera takes her place in Anubis House. Jasper is always acting very suspicious and once has stolen an item from the tunnels. Trudy (Mina Anwar) has spotted Jasper with the Collector many times. However, having second thoughts of working for Rufus once learning that he kidnapped Trudy (Mina Anwar) and refused to return her once getting him Sarah's dollhouse, Jasper resolves to aid the Sibunas. Jasper is now furious with Rufus and with the help of the Sibunas getting Trudy back.

Jasper Choudhary is portrayed by Sartaj Garewal.

=== Vera Devenish ===
Vera Devenish is an evil woman who works for Rufus in return for immortality. Forcing Jasper to help her obtain the Mask of Anubis, Vera manages to take Trudy's place as new Anubis House mother and play on Victor's emotions to work incognito while portraying herself as a kind-hearted woman and his confidant in undermining Sibuna. However, with help from Mara and Ms. Andrews, Trudy saw through Vera's act and attempted to expose her. This in turn forces Vera to kidnap Trudy and give her to Rufus. After Jasper betrays them, Rufus takes his frustrations on Vera while threatening her life if he does not get the real mask. Eventually, after Victor learns the truth, Vera is evicted from Anubis House.

Vera Devenish is portrayed by Poppy Miller.

=== Robert Frobisher-Smythe ===
Robert Frobisher-Smythe is the founder of the Anubis estate who only makes brief appearances in seasons 1 and 2 but is featured more prominently in season 3. Prior to the events in the series, he attended Howard Carter's expedition to Tutankhamen's tomb in Egypt, where he stole several important artifacts, including the Cup of Ankh. Many of these objects were hidden in the house. Robert is shown to be a very intelligent man, as he created hidden tunnels underneath the house and set several traps to prevent anyone from discovering the treasure. For a while, he lived at the Anubis estate. The Rodenmaar family eventually came to reside there as well. As Robert started exploring more, he stayed home less, causing Sarah to feel neglected and constantly bothered by the Rodenmaars. Before his marriage to Louisa Frobisher-Smythe, Robert was previously married with a son who was KT Rush's grandfather. This makes KT the great-granddaughter of Robert.

He and his wife were believed to have died many years before. Their daughter Sarah even suggests that Victor murdered them. This is revealed to be false, as Robert is found to still be alive living inside a tank protected by "the keeper". Before he was put inside the tank, he gave instructions to specific people (and left heavy loads of information in a secret room within the house) on how to properly awaken him when the time came. Victor was the enabler, Mr. Sweet was the seeker, and Harriet Denby was the keeper. The ceremony was not to be performed by the impure of heart. Since Caroline Denby renounced her sister's identity as the keeper and took it upon herself to take part in the ceremony, Robert was awakened evil. At first, he kept his presence within the gatehouse a secret from everyone else. He uttered strange incantations, calling out to an unknown force. His plan was described to Caroline - he had to collect five sinners inside the sarcophagi inside the tank room to summon Ammut. These people were Victor, Patricia, Mr. Sweet, Fabian, and Alfie. Robert instructed Patricia to destroy the phonograph in the secret room and replaced the recorded message with a new one telling the Sibunas to build the Staff of Osiris. His plan was set into motion, and Eddie unknowingly brought the staff right to him. Once Ammut was summoned, Robert used an enchanted book to collect more followers for Ammut to make her strong enough to leave the gatehouse. The only one with immunity to his attack was Willow, who was protected by the moon key. Eddie, KT, and Harriet infiltrated the gatehouse to prevent Ammut from gaining more power. Before they could unite the sun and moon keys to close the portal, Robert tried to reason with them. KT wanted to help, but Eddie ignored him and pressed on, destroying the staff, closing the portal, and defeating Caroline. Robert's good intentions finally returned, and he decided to go off to Egypt with Harriet.

Robert Frobisher-Smythe is portrayed by John Sackville.

=== Caroline Denby ===
Caroline Denby is the new History and Business Ed Teacher in season 3. She is previously known as Harriet Denby until her real name, Caroline Denby, is revealed later in the season. On her first day she had the class do a family tree project on the first day, and Mr. Sweet canceled it so KT doesn't find out she is Frobisher's great-granddaughter and for Patricia, Alfie, Joy and Jerome not to find out they are the descendants of his friends who went to Egypt with him. She lives in the Gatehouse. She has Robert Frobisher-Smythe in her attic, and is the sibling of Harriet Denby, who is in a mental hospital after Caroline puts her there. It is also revealed that Caroline is adopted. After the ceremony does not go well, she leaves the school, but when she finds that the ceremony worked, she agrees to stay at the school. She helps Robert find all the sinners. In the end gets sucked into the underworld with Ammut.

Caroline Denby is portrayed by Susy Kane.

=== Harriet Denby ===
Harriet Denby is the adopted sister of Caroline Denby, and is in a mental hospital because of her sister, Caroline Denby. She is then locked in the gatehouse with Caroline and Frobisher, but then she drinks pills and becomes a normal person. She tries to help Eddie, KT, and Willow to try to destroy Ammut and Frobisher so the sinners can no longer be them and the bad souls in the students at the school can be gone. She then gets a soul into her by Ammut and KT and Eddie get Ms. Denby's key and KT's key and stop Ammut. In the end she and Robert head off to Egypt.

Harriet Denby is portrayed by Bryony Afferson.

== Other characters ==
=== Sergeant Roebuck ===
Sergeant Roebuck is a member of the police who Patricia turns to, tricking her into thinking that he called Joy's parents and that she was safe and living at home, along with writing email from Joy saying that she had to leave the school because her dad got a new job. Since the society disbanded, Roebuck has not been seen since.

Sergeant Roebuck is portrayed by Nicholas Bailey.

=== Ade Rutter ===
Ade Rutter is the uncle of Fabian. He operates a local antique shop and is consulted by Fabian about the cylinders. He also gives him the book "Unlocking the Eye" that becomes vital in the search. He believes and repeatedly mentions Nina and Fabian becoming a couple. He seems to like Trudy when he first meets her at the house and attends the play that Nina wrote with Fabian

Ade Rutter is portrayed by Simon Chandler.

=== Frederick Mercer ===
Frederick Mercer is Joy's father and a member of the society, he helps to try to keep Joy being the Chosen One a secret. He tricks the Sibuna gang into believing their only protecting Joy from Rufus but it turned out to be a lie. He appears in the season finale where the society was about to build the cup and drink from it. However, they all fail due to Joy not being the Chosen One and Frederick presumably quit the society.

Frederick Mercer is portrayed by Michael Lumsden.

=== Nurse Delia ===
Nurse Delia is a nurse working at a hospital close to Anubis School and is a member of the society. When Victor kidnaps Rufus, he delivers him to Nurse Delia at the hospital where she holds him hostage while he is still in a coma. But Patricia rescues him and Delia tells Victor he got away. She appears in the season finale where the society attempt to assemble the Cup of Ankh, but they fail and Delia presumably quit the society.

Nurse Delia is portrayed by Sheri-An Davis.

=== Esther Robinson ===
Esther Robinson or Ms. Robinson, as the students call her, is the athletics teacher. Jerome tried to impress her by saving everyone from a fake fire. She also helped Mick train for a sports scholarship when Mara stopped helping Mick. While helping Mick train, she was framed by Mara. As a consequence, she was fired, for a short amount of time since Mara confessed later in the show. She is not shown in season 2.

Mrs. Robinson is portrayed by Catherine Bailey.

=== Poppy Clarke ===
Poppy Clarke is Jerome's little sister, seen in season 2. She is determined to find her Dad and unknowingly finds out he is a criminal when she overhears Jerome and Mara talking. She is bestfriends with Mara. Jerome calls Poppy "poopy" while Poppy usually refers to Jerome as "Gerbil." She is not in Season 3 as Poppy changed schools to be closer to her father.

Poppy Clarke is portrayed by Frances Encell.

=== Gran ===
Gran is the grandmother of Nina Martin. Nina has been living with her since her parents' passing in America. After the holidays, she stays at a hotel near the House of Anubis but it floods. Since her hotel flooded she shared a room with Nina and Amber at the House of Anubis. She then went sight-seeing and had an accident. She is currently in a hospital and the doctor says it is nothing serious. Trudy and Nina visit her frequently. But after time passed. It was recently revealed that she was the timepiece and she has the Mark of Anubis because she was cursed by Senkhara. Senkhara threatens Nina by telling her that the "old one" will die at sunset tomorrow after Fabian and Joy choose saving the Sibunas over the mask. In the Season 2 Finale, at the end of the episode Gran is cured and is released from the hospital. She attends the party at Anubis House and celebrates. It was revealed in Season 3 that she became ill once again.

Gran was voiced by Barbara Barnes in the first season. She is currently portrayed by Gwyneth Powell.

=== John Clarke ===
John Clarke is the father of Jerome and Poppy. He was a resident of Anubis House, along with Eric Sweet. He used to be in prison. He got released from prison on the season 2 finale.

John Clarke is portrayed by Philip Wright.

=== Miss Valentine ===
Miss Valentine is the new French teacher that replaced Mrs. Andrews in season 2. Miss Valentine previously worked at the school that Mick transferred to in Australia. She claims that she decided to work at the school because Mick told her so much about his friends there. She accidentally read the message that Mick gave to her for his friends as "I can't wait to introduce my girl from Australia" instead of "I can't wait to introduce my girl to Australia".

Miss Valentine is portrayed by Sarah Paul.

=== Piper Williamson ===
Piper Williamson is Patricia's twin sister who skipped her flight to a music academy in Milan to visit her sister in England. She first appears when people mistakenly believe she is Patricia; she is caught walking near the Frobisher Library and is brought back to the school for an interrogation. Victor is certain she has the Ox Bell, thinking her as Patricia, and is infuriated when he finds nothing. Her and Patricia seem to be complete opposites. She is musically gifted. She is jealous of Patricia because Patricia is the "fun twin." She has a crush on Alfie, who returns her feelings. She and Eddie share a passionate kiss, as he mistakes her for Patricia. He later realizes his mistake and regrets what happened. It later leads to severe conflict with Patricia. In Season 3, Piper appears briefly to help Eddie with the nursery rhyme, since Patricia forgot, to find the missing artifact in "the summerhouse beneath the weeds".

Piper Williamson is portrayed by Nikita Ramsey, who is Jade Ramsey's real life twin sister.

=== Victor Rodemnaar Sr. ===
Victor Rodemnaar Sr. is Victor's father and was the founding leader of the Society. Using Victor, abusing him with threats and molding him in his image, Rodemnaar intended to force Sarah to tell him the location of the Cup of Ankh to no avail and translated the formula for the Elixir of Life to extend not only his life before also to Victor and their followers. However, while searching for the Mask of Anubis, Rodemnaar fell through a trapdoor while playing Senet and died there, and the formula to the Elixir of Life was lost. Appearing to Nina as a spirit, Rodemnaar reveals the power of the Chosen One and the Osirian to her before giving her his ring to give to Victor as parting gift as his way of apologizing for wrong him, which contain the last of the Tears of Gold. Which at the end of season 2 Victor found the tear and there was another mystery he had to solve.

Like his son, Victor Rodemnaar Sr. is portrayed by Francis Magee.

=== Ben Reed ===
Ben Reed (or Benji) is Eddie's rival who comes to the school on a sports exchanged. He boards at Isis House and preps his housemates for the school's annual dodgeball tournament. He manages to snag the attention of Eddie's girlfriend, Patricia. After the Anubis House residents win the dodgeball tournament, Ben reveals that he was jealous of Eddie. The two put their differences aside and finally become friends before Ben leaves the school.

Ben Reed is portrayed by Freddie Boath.

=== Sophia Danae ===
Sophia Danae arrives at Anubis House prior to the students' graduation. She instantly falls for Eddie, which makes Patricia angry. She appears to be completely new and forms a rift with Victor, who may have recognized her. At the museum, Sophia, Dexter, and Eddie marvel at the Touchstone of Ra, a rare artifact needed to construct the Pyramid of Ra. It is later revealed that Sophia forged a false invitation to the museum by Mr. Cornelian and sent it to Mr. Sweet so she could steal the artifact. She manages to slip the Touchstone inside of Eddie's bag in order to frame him. During an interrogation later that day, Victor confiscates the Touchstone from the students. In the cellar, the students organize a secret party. During the festivities, Sophia sneaks away and steals the Touchstone. She is initiated into Sibuna after the gang overhears Victor and Mr. Sweet talking about building the Pyramid of Ra and a sacrifice needed to do so. She does not get along with Patricia whatsoever but everyone else likes her. After stealing the Touchstone from Eddie's room, Sophia tricks the Sibunas. KT and Alfie discover her disloyalty when she appears in many previous graduation photos, leading them to believe she is potentially taking the elixir. Mara realize that Sophia's father is the alchemist, Robert Frobisher-Smythe's business partner. During the graduation, she harnesses the power of the Touchstone to create the Pyramid and lure Mara (the one to be sacrificed) to its grounds. Eddie defeats Sophia, transforming her into stone, but loses his Osirian powers.

Sophia Danae is portrayed by Claudia Jessie.
