= Animals (2012 film) =

2012 film

- Film poster
- Directed by: Marçal Forés
- Starring: Oriol Pla; Augustus Prew
- Music by: Natalie Holt
- Release date: 27 September 2012 (SSIFF)
- Running time: 94 minutes
- Country: Spain
- Languages: Catalan; English

Animals is a 2012 Spanish drama film directed by Marçal Forés.

== Cast ==
- Oriol Pla - Pol
- Augustus Prew - Ikari
- Dimitri Leonidas - Mark
- Roser Tapias - Laia
- Javier Beltrán - Llorenç
- Martin Freeman - Albert
