= Alexandra Shipp =

American actress

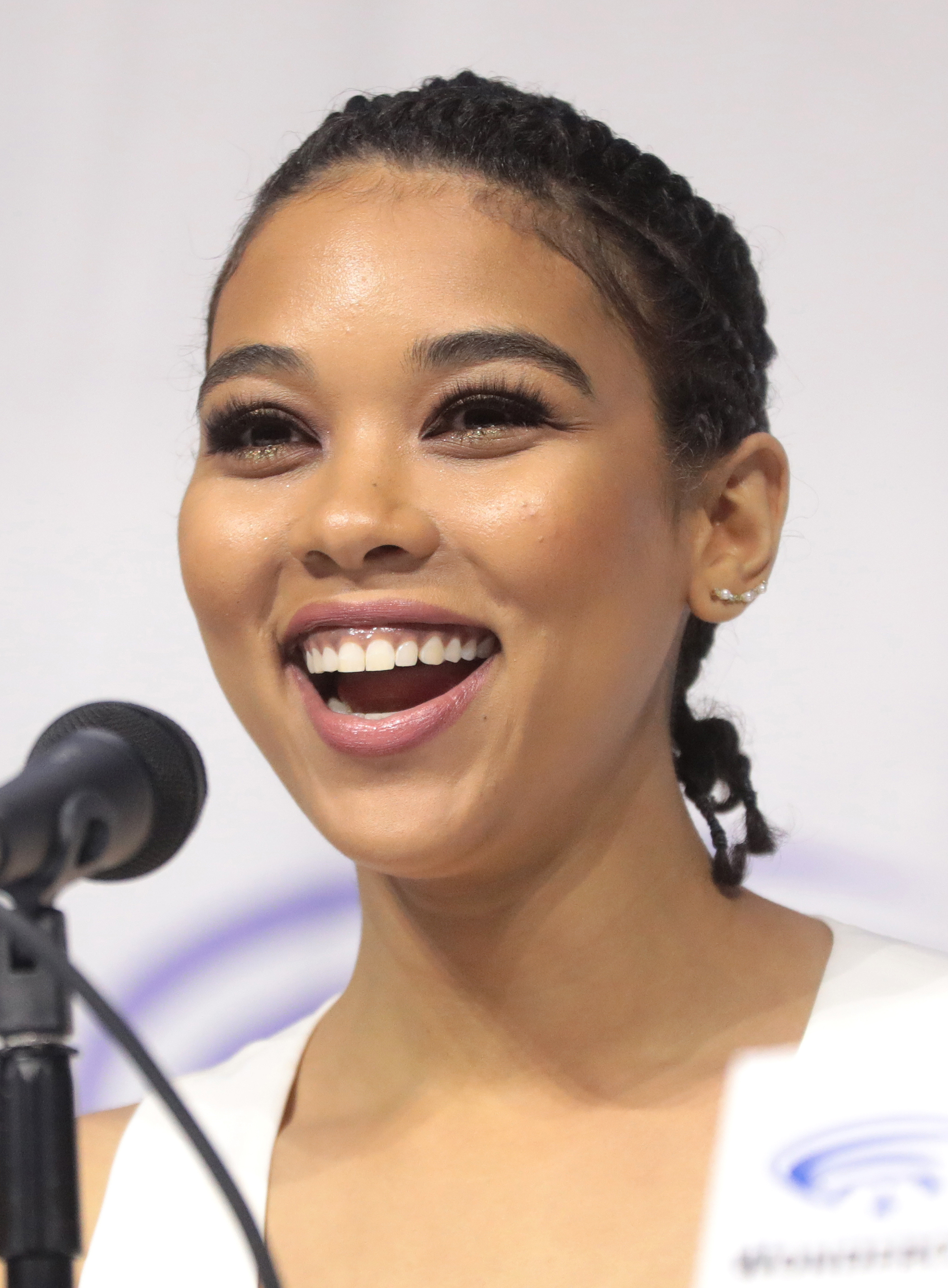
- Shipp in 2019
- Born: July 16, 1991 (age 35); Phoenix, Arizona, U.S.
- Occupations: Actress; singer
- Years active: 2009–present

Alexandra Shipp (born July 16, 1991) is an American actress and singer who rose to prominence for portraying singer Aaliyah in the Lifetime television film Aaliyah: The Princess of R&B (2014), and Kimberly Woodruff, in the film Straight Outta Compton (2015).

Shipp is best known for playing Storm in the X-Men franchise, starting with X-Men: Apocalypse, Abby Suso in the 2018 romantic comedy Love, Simon, and Susan Wilson in musical drama tick, tick... BOOM!

== Early life ==
Shipp was born in Phoenix, Arizona. Her mother is a Kundalini yoga teacher, and her father James Sr. is a marketing executive. She has two brothers, James and Jordan, and a stepsister, Kasia. Shipp was educated at Squaw Peak Elementary School, Arizona School for the Arts, and St. Mary's Catholic High School in Phoenix. She moved to Los Angeles at the age of 17 to pursue an acting career.

== Career ==
In 2009, Shipp made her acting debut with a minor role in Alvin and the Chipmunks: The Squeakquel. She went on to star in the third season of Nickelodeon's mystery teen drama series House of Anubis, playing the role of KT Rush.

In 2014, Shipp gained attention for her roles as Dani Raymond in the VH1 television film sequel Drumline: A New Beat and Aaliyah Haughton, the title role, in the Lifetime television film Aaliyah: The Princess of R&B. For the latter performance, Shipp also sang. She next portrayed Ice Cube's wife, Kimberly Woodruff, in the biographical drama film Straight Outta Compton, which chronicled the careers of hip hop group N.W.A. In 2016, she co-starred in Bryan Singer's superhero film X-Men: Apocalypse as Ororo Munroe/Storm, a weather-controlling mutant previously portrayed by Halle Berry. In 2018, she starred alongside Nick Robinson and Jorge Lendeborg Jr. in Love, Simon and Kathryn Prescott and Lucy Hale in Dude, both high school comedy films.

She reprised the role of Ororo Munroe / Storm in the 2019 film Dark Phoenix, and, the same summer, also starred as Sasha Arias in the Shaft sequel. In 2021 she starred in the film adaptation of tick, tick... BOOM! as Susan.

Shipp starred in Greta Gerwig’s Barbie, released on July 21, 2023. In November 2023, Shipp was cast in the revenge thriller film Violent Ends, which co-stars Billy Magnussen and Nick Stahl. Additionally, she starred in the horror film Forbidden Fruits as a member of a witch cult operating out of a retail store. Both films were released by IFC Films in 2026.

== Personal life ==
Shipp publicly came out as LGBT in June 2021.

== Filmography ==
Key
†	Denotes films that have not yet been released

=== Film ===
Year	Title	Role	Notes
2009	Alvin and the Chipmunks: The Squeakquel	Valentina	
2015	Straight Outta Compton	Kimberly Woodruff	
2016	X-Men: Apocalypse	Ororo Munroe / Storm	
2017	Tragedy Girls	McKayla Hooper	
2018	Spinning Man	Anna	
2018	Love, Simon	Abby Suso	
2018	Dude	Amelia	
2018	Deadpool 2	Ororo Munroe / Storm	Uncredited cameo
2019	A Dog's Way Home	Olivia	
2019	Dark Phoenix	Ororo Munroe / Storm	
2019	Shaft	Sasha Arias	
2019	Jexi	Cate Finnegan	
2020	All the Bright Places	Kate Finch	
2020	Endless	Riley Jean Stanheight	Also executive producer
2020	Father of the Bride, Part 3(ish)	Rachel Banks	Short film
2021	Silk Road	Julia Vie	
2021	Tick, Tick... Boom!	Susan Wilson	
2022	Space Oddity	Daisy Taylor	
2022	Asking for It	Regina	
2023	The Good Half	Zoey Abbot	
2023	Barbie	Writer Barbie	
2023	Anyone but You	Claudia	
2025	Glenrothan	Amy	
2025	Violent Ends	Emma Darling	
2026	Forbidden Fruits	Fig	
2026	Misty Green	Bella	
TBA	Kung Fury 2 †	Rey Porter	Completed
TBA	Midnight †	Emma	Post-production; Also producer
TBA	White Elephant †		Post-production

=== Television ===
Year	Title	Role	Notes
2011	Switched at Birth	Ashley	Episode: "Dance Amongst Daggers"
2012	Victorious	Elise	Episode: "The Gorilla Club"
2013	House of Anubis	KT Rush	41 episodes
2013	House of Anubis: The Touchstone of Ra	KT Rush	TV special
2013	Occult	Alana Hutchins	Unsold A&E pilot
2013	Awkward	Abby Martin	Episode: "Less Than Hero"
2014	Ray Donovan	Tiffany	Episode: "Yo Soy Capitan"
2014	Days of Our Lives	Mary Beth	3 episodes
2014	Drumline: A New Beat	Dani Raymond	Television film
2014	Aaliyah: The Princess of R&B	Aaliyah Haughton	Television film
2015	Your Family or Mine	Lucy	Episode: "Pilot"
2020	Make It Work!	Herself	Television special
2024	Laid	Aubrey	Episode: "More Handsome Than Joe Jonas"

=== Video games ===
Year	Title	Role
2019	Telling Lies	Ava

=== Music videos ===
Year	Title	Artist(s)	Role
2021	"Chance"	Hayley Kiyoko	Love interest
2025	"Mad"	Reneé Rapp	Mad partner

== Discography ==
=== Singles ===
Title	Year	Album
"Dirty Long Sleeve Shirt"	2021	TBA

=== Promotional singles ===
Title	Year	Album
"30/90" (with Andrew Garfield, Joshua Henry, Vanessa Hudgens, Robin de Jesús and Mj Rodriguez)	2021	Tick, Tick... Boom! (Soundtrack from the Netflix Film)

=== Music videos ===
Title	Year	Director
"Dirty Long Sleeve Shirt"	2021	John Duff

== Awards and nominations ==
Year	Award	Category	Nominated work	Result	Ref.
2016	Teen Choice Awards	Choice Movie: Breakout Star	X-Men: Apocalypse	Nominated	
2017	Nickelodeon Kids' Choice Awards	Favorite Squad	X-Men: Apocalypse	Nominated	
