= Kill Ben Lyk =

- Film poster
- Directed by: Erwan Marinopoulos
- Written by: Erwan Marinopoulos; Jean-Christophe Establet; Oliver Maltman
- Produced by: Erwan Marinopoulos
- Starring: Eugene Simon; Simone Ashley; Dimitri Leonidas; Bronson Webb
- Production company: ZORG Studios
- Release date: 4 November 2018 (Unrestricted View)
- Running time: 77 minutes
- Countries: United Kingdom; France
- Language: English

Kill Ben Lyk is a British comedy thriller film written by Jean-Christophe Establet, Oliver Maltman and Erwan Marinopoulos, produced by the latter, released 2018 before a French release on VOD in 2020.

In London, in two days, three people named Ben Lyk were killed. Scotland Yard decides to reunite in an isolated house all of remaining Ben Lyks to ensure their safety.

== Plot ==
In London, Ben Lyk (portrayed by Eugene Simon), a young YouTuber dreaming of fame is worried: in two days, three people who shared his name were assassinated. He fears he might be the next on the list. After a cry for help, he is taken in by Scotland Yard and driven to an isolated house far away from the city. The police are investigating the serial murders and have decided to reunite all of the Ben Lyks who live in the capital to protect them while they are solving the case. However, this respite is short lived: it seems that the killer managed to infiltrate the place...

== Cast ==
- Eugene Simon : Ben Lyk
- Martyn Ford : Bale
- Charlie Rawes: Rugby Ben Lyk
- Simone Ashley: Girl Ben Lyk
- Dimitri Leonidas: Roberto
- Bronson Webb: Nervous Ben Lyk
- Andrew Hall: Older Ben Lyk
- Scroobius Pip: Hipster Ben Lyk
- Gretchen Egolf: Talister
- Ashley Thomas: Charming Ben Lyk
- Bruce Mackinnon: Banker Ben Lyk
- Meera Rayann: Anna
- Dan Cade: Officer Hillvalley
- Adam Astill: Officer Hawkins
- Daz Black: Young Ben Lyk
- Ania Gauer: Waiting Girl
- Alexandra Naoum: Knight Ben Lyk's mistress
- James Clamers: Scott
- Avant Strangel: Officer Sunnydale
- Guy Combes: Ben Lyk's neighbour
- Suzanne Procter: Ben Lyk's neighbour's wife
- William Sciortino: Mafia boss
- Guillaume Clément: Police officer
- Stéphane Otero: Dave
- Thomas Croisière: Alpaga gunman
- Daniel Page: Knight Ben Lyk
- Tristan Tenardier: Hospitalized Ben Lyk
- François Vincentelli: O'Sullivan
- George Colebrook: Officer Haddonfield

== Reception ==
On the review aggregator website Rotten Tomatoes, 83% of 6 critics' reviews are positive, with an average rating of 6.1/10. Evan Saathoff wrote, during the 2019 edition of Fantasporto: "Great dose of fun, ends on a punchline for the ages". Alex Saveliev, on his review for the site Film Thread, has a more mixed opinion: "The indie, British answer to Rian Johnson’s Knives Out, Erwan Marinopoulos’ Kill Ben Lyk may lack the sophistication, razor-sharp wit and immaculate plotting of its bigger Hollywood brother, but still provides a diverting, mindless 70 minutes or so of quirky, cheeky fun. Perhaps a better comparison would be Ben Wheatley’s Free Fire, as both films similarly shoot themselves in the foot by stuffing one plot complication too many into the otherwise-minimalist narrative."

== Awards ==
In 2018, Kill Ben Lyk was nominated for the best thriller category during the Nightmares Film Festival and won the best British feature award during the London Independent Film Awards.
