= Eugene Simon =

English actor

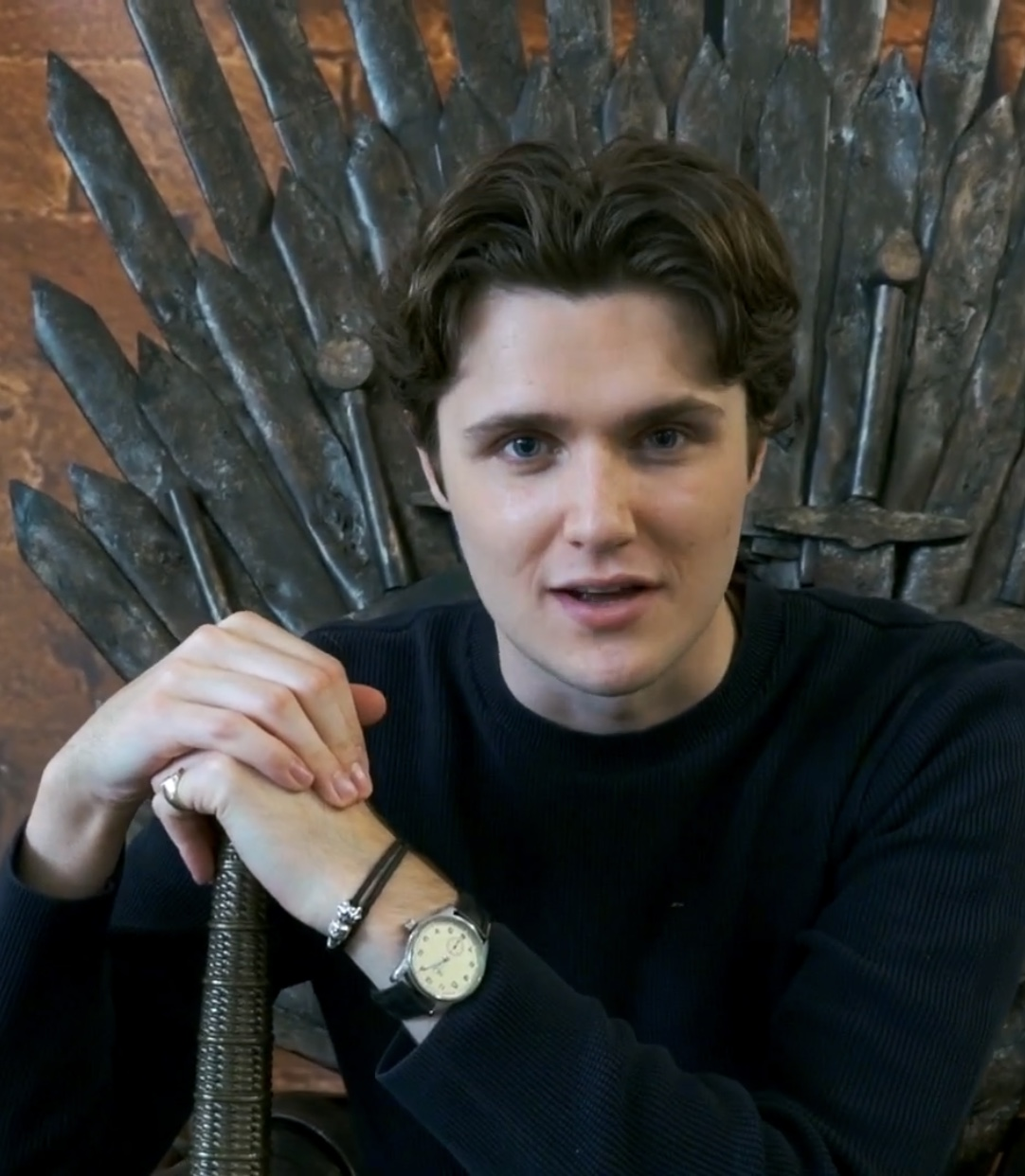
- Simon at the 2020 Filmbörse Dortmund
- Born: Eugene Michael Simon; 11 June 1992 (age 34); Westminster, London, England
- Occupation: Actor
- Years active: 2003–present
- Website: eugenesimon.co.uk

Eugene Michael Simon (born 11 June 1992) is an English actor. He is best known for his roles as Jerome Clarke in the Nickelodeon mystery series House of Anubis (2011–2013) and Lancel Lannister in the HBO fantasy series Game of Thrones (2011–2016).

== Early life and education ==
Simon was born in London to Anton (died 2017) and Teresa (née Stopford) Simon. He has two older brothers, Charles (born 1987) and Harry, and a younger sister, Fleur. Simon attended Downside School in Somerset and Bryanston School in Dorset. He trained at Joseph Pearlman's acting academy in Los Angeles.

== Career ==
Around eight years old, Simon's mother signed him up for an acting agency. He began appearing in commercials before appearing in film roles as a young Gerald Durrell in My Family and Other Animals and then as a young Giacomo Casanova in Casanova in 2005.

On his eighteenth birthday, Simon received the news that he had been cast as Lancel Lannister in the HBO series Game of Thrones and as Jerome Clarke in the Nickelodeon series House of Anubis.

Simon played young Eugene Devlin in 2013 film Before I Sleep and Kennefick in the 2015 film Eden. He went on to star as Sean Nally in the 2017 Irish film The Lodgers and as the titular role in the 2018 film Kill Ben Lyk. He appeared in the 2018 production of For King and Country at Southwark Playhouse and the 2019 stage adaptation of A Room with a View at L.A. Theatre Works.

== Personal life ==
Simon is based between London and Los Angeles. In 2019, he led acting workshops in Valletta. He has been vocal about men's mental health and suicide prevention on social media, appearing on the 2020 Well Beings Virtual National Town Hall & Panel Discussion.

== Filmography ==
=== Film roles ===
Year	Title	Role	Notes
2005	Casanova	Giacomo Casanova (11 Years Old)	
2006	Alpha Male	Young Felix Methuselah	
2013	Before I Sleep	Young Eugene Devlin	
2015	Eden	Kennefick	
2017	The Lodgers	Sean Nally	
2017	Resonance	Toby	Short film
2018	Kill Ben Lyk	Ben Lyk	
2018	Mens Sana	Mark	Short film
2018	Love Have I Known	Young Captain James Piney	Short film
2021	Sensation	Andrew Cooper	
2022	The Fence	Andrew Knight	

=== Television roles ===
Year	Title	Role	Notes
2003	My Dad's the Prime Minister	Harry	4 episodes
2004	Murder in Suburbia	Josh Taylor	Episode: " A Good Deal of Attention"
2004	Noah and Saskia	Eddie	7 episodes
2005	My Family and Other Animals	Gerald Durrell	
2010	Ben Hur	Young Judah Ben Hur	
2011–2013	House of Anubis	Jerome Clarke	Main Character; 191 episodes
2011–2013	Anubis Unlocked	Himself	19 episodes
2011–2016	Game of Thrones	Lancel Lannister	16 episodes
2012	Summer in Transylvania	Max	Episode: "I Dated a Teenage Vampire"
2013	House of Anubis: Touchstone of Ra	Jerome Clarke	TV special
2015	Vidfest Diaries	Himself	Episode: 2.9
2016	Last Week	Himself	Episode: "Last Week I Made Evan Cry"
2017	Genius	Eduard Einstein	2 episodes
2017–2019	Thronecast	Himself	2 episodes

== Stage ==
Year	Title	Role	Notes
2018	For King and Country	Padre	From John Wilson's play Hamp, adapted by Paul Tomlinson, Southwark Playhouse
2019	A Room with a View	George Emerson	Adaptated from E.M. Forster's novel A Room with a View, by Kate McAll, L.A. Theatre Works

== Awards and nominations ==
Year	Association	Category	Work	Result	Notes
2018	Nightmare Film Festival	Best Actor	Kill Ben Lyk	Won	
2020	Love Story Film Festival	Best Actor	Love Have I Known	Won	
