= Eden (2015 film) =

- Theatrical release poster
- Directed by: Shyam Madiraju
- Screenplay by: Mark Mavrothalasitis
- Story by: Nate Parker
- Produced by: Jaume Collet-Serra; Shyam Madiraju; Nate Parker; Hernany Perla; Juan Sola
- Starring: Nate Parker; Ethan Peck; Jessica Lowndes; Diego Boneta; James Remar; Sung Kang; Mario Casas; Rob Mayes; Eugene Simon; Joey Pollari; Leore Hayon
- Cinematography: Khalid Mohtaseb
- Edited by: Todd E. Miller; Sean Valla
- Music by: José Villalobos
- Distributed by: Voltage Pictures
- Release date: September 18, 2015
- Running time: 97 minutes
- Countries: United States; Spain
- Language: English

Eden is a 2015 survival film directed by Shyam Madiraju. The film stars Ethan Peck, Nate Parker, Jessica Lowndes, Diego Boneta, James Remar, and Sung Kang.

== Plot ==
The story is about a partially filled United States men's national soccer team plane, returning to the US from Brazil after a FIFA World Cup match, that crashes off an uninhabited Malaysian tropical island. After the crash, the coach and his wife, along with several players and the entire crew, are dead. The 15 survivors that reach the island find themselves in the most dire of circumstances with limited resources, dwindling food supply and no rescue coming any time soon. On day one, when they recover some food from the offshore wreck, team bench warmer Kennefick panics at the sight of a shark and lets the food float away.

Team spirit evaporates as disagreements cause the group to separate into factions – a violent one led by assistant team captain Andreas, and a compassionate one led by team captain Slim. On the seventh day, Connie commits suicide, reducing the group to 14. Later that day, Georgie – brother of Andreas – steps on a land mine and dies that night, reducing the group to 13. On the eighth day, Patton and McKenna leave in the only rubber raft, rather than let Eva cut it up as a water collector, reducing the island to 11.

Elena starts having sexual relations with Andreas, while her sister, Eva, starts having sexual relations with Felix. On the ninth day, when they discover that Kennefick has stolen a third of the limited rations for himself, Andreas attempts to cut his throat, but is stopped by Slim and Felix, though Felix is accidentally stabbed and dies, reducing the island to ten. In the early hours of day 14, Doug kills Markese, then Slim kills Arnie, leaving eight survivors. As the sun comes up, rescue helicopters arrive, having found Patton and McKenna on the raft that Slim wanted to destroy. Andreas hides rather than return with Slim and the other five, and those six sentence Andreas to death by lying and saying that no one else is on the island.

== Cast ==
- Nate Parker as "Slim"
- Ethan Peck as Andreas
- Sung Kang as Connie
- Diego Boneta as Arnie
- Jessica Lowndes as Elena
- Leore Hayon as Eva
- Rob Mayes as Markese
- Ryan Mulkay as Sevy
- Mario Casas as Felix
- Joey Pollari as Georgie
- Eugene Simon as Kennefick
- Michael Cardelle as McKenna
- Brad Schmidt as Patton
- Matthew Testro as Doug
- James Remar as Coach DaFoe

== Production ==
Parker presented the idea to Hernany Perla at Lionsgate Films. The two collaborated on the idea until Parker's agents at the William Morris Endeavor sought Mark Mavrothalasitis to write a screenplay. Parker directed a teaser in order to seek funding for the film prior to June 2013 when Ethan Peck, Diego Boneta and Nate Parker were attached to the project. The North American distribution rights were acquired by Vertical Entertainment in February 2015. Voltage Pictures handled international distribution rights at the 2015 Berlin Film Festival.

== Critical reception ==
The film was met with limited negative reviews. As of February 2016, the film does not have an official score at Metacritic because 4 reviews are required. Both of the film's Metacritic reviewers (Michael Rechtshaffen of Los Angeles Times and Chris Packham of The Village Voice) gave the film a 30 score out of 100. Nick Schager of Film Journal International used terms like "insufferable", "third-rate" and "hellish" to summarize the film and described its actors as "lousy".
