= Tick, Tick... Boom! (soundtrack) =

2021 soundtrack album by the cast of Netflix's film tick, tick...BOOM!

Tick, Tick... Boom! (Soundtrack from the Netflix Film)
- Album cover

Soundtrack album by The Cast of Netflix's film tick, tick...BOOM!
- Released: November 12, 2021
- Genre: Film soundtrack
- Length: 54:03
- Labels: Maisie Music Publishing; Masterworks Broadway
- Producers: Alex Lacamoire; Bill Sherman; Kurt Crowley; Greg Wells

Singles from Tick, Tick... Boom! (Soundtrack from the Netflix Film)
- 1. "30/90" Released: October 5, 2021; 2. "Louder Than Words" Released: October 22, 2021

Tick, Tick... Boom! (Soundtrack from the Netflix Film) is the soundtrack for the American biographical musical drama film Tick, Tick... Boom!. Directed by Lin-Manuel Miranda in his feature directorial debut, it is the adaptation of Jonathan Larson's musical of the same name. The tracks were performed by the film's ensemble cast consisted of Andrew Garfield, Robin de Jesús, Alexandra Shipp, Joshua Henry, Judith Light, and Vanessa Hudgens. All Jonathan Larson songs in the film were produced by Alex Lacamoire, Bill Sherman, and Kurt Crowley. The songs were mixed by Greg Wells, and music supervised by Stephen Gizicki.

The Tick, Tick... Boom! soundtrack was released for streaming and digital download on November 12, 2021, by Masterworks Broadway on the same day as the film's theatrical release. A physical CD was launched on December 3, 2021. Two singles – "30/90" was released via streaming on October 5, 2021 and "Louder Than Words" was also released as a single along with the album's pre-order date on October 22, 2021.

== Production ==
Miranda and screenwriter Steven Levenson felt it was important for the film to play with the credit "score by Jonathan Larson" and so sourced many songs from the Library of Congress archives, including several that had never received an official release. This includes three songs from Superbia not included in the soundtrack: "Ever After" (used to underscore the focus group meeting), "LCD Readout", and "Sextet". Kurt Crowley released a solo arrangement of the latter featuring Joshua Henry during the COVID-induced break in the film's production. After considerable fan demand, the newly titled "Sextet Montage" was released as a single on February 4, 2022 in honor of what would have been Larson's 62nd birthday.

The film also includes three stand-alone songs by Larson: "Rhapsody", which plays in the background of Susan's dance recital and over the film's credits; "Out of My Dreams" covered by Veronica Vazquez, which can be heard when Jonathan meets Susan on the roof; and "It Only Takes a Few", covered by The Mountain Goats, which plays over the credits. Of these, only "Out of My Dreams" and "It Only Takes a Few" were released on the film's soundtrack.

== Track listing ==
All tracks are written by Jonathan Larson.

Tick, Tick... Boom! (Soundtrack from the Netflix Film) track listing
| No. | Title | Performer(s) | Length |
|---|---|---|---|
| 1. | "30/90" | Andrew Garfield; Joshua Henry; Vanessa Hudgens; Robin de Jesús; Alexandra Shipp; Mj Rodriguez | 4:22 |
| 2. | "Boho Days" | Garfield; de Jesús; Shipp; Henry; Hudgens | 1:28 |
| 3. | "Green Green Dress" | Henry | 0:42 |
| 4. | "No More" | Garfield; de Jesús | 3:11 |
| 5. | "Johnny Can't Decide" | Garfield; Hudgens; Henry | 3:31 |
| 6. | "Sunday" | Garfield; The Moondance Diner Ensemble | 2:50 |
| 7. | "Play Game" | Tariq Trotter | 1:12 |
| 8. | "Therapy" | Garfield; Hudgens | 2:44 |
| 9. | "Swimming" | Garfield; Hudgens; Henry | 3:16 |
| 10. | "Come to Your Senses" | Shipp; Hudgens | 4:27 |
| 11. | "Real Life" | de Jesús | 1:43 |
| 12. | "Why" | Garfield | 5:22 |
| 13. | "Louder Than Words" | Garfield; Hudgens; Henry | 4:53 |
| 14. | "Come to Your Senses" (end credit version) | Jazmine Sullivan | 4:09 |
| 15. | "Green Green Dress" (bonus track) | Garfield; Shipp | 2:42 |
| 16. | "Out of My Dreams" (bonus track) | Veronica Vasquez | 3:25 |
| 17. | "Only Takes a Few" (bonus track) | The Mountain Goats | 4:09 |
| Total length: | | | 54:03 |

== Charts ==
Chart performance for Tick, Tick... Boom! (Soundtrack from the Netflix Film)
| Chart (2021) | Peak position |
|---|---|
| UK Compilation Albums (OCC) | 5 |
| UK Digital Albums (OCC) | 29 |
| UK Soundtrack Albums (OCC) | 6 |
| US Soundtrack Albums (Billboard) | 15 |

== Release history ==
Release dates and formats for Tick, Tick... Boom! (Soundtrack from the Netflix Film)
| Region | Date | Format(s) | Label | Version(s) | Ref. |
|---|---|---|---|---|---|
| Various | November 12, 2021 | Digital download; streaming | Maisie Music; Masterworks | Standard | |
| Various | December 3, 2021 | CD | Maisie Music; Masterworks | Standard | |
| Various | January 1, 2022 | Vinyl | Ultra | Deluxe | |
