= Dimitri Leonidas =

British actor (born 1987)

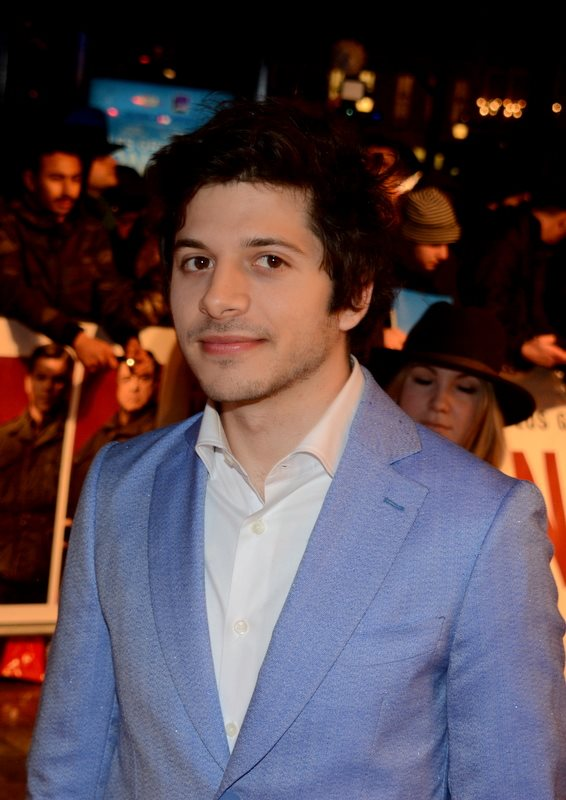
- Leonidas in 2014
- Born: 14 November 1987 (age 38); Brent, London, England
- Occupation: Actor
- Years active: 2001–present
- Relatives: Stephanie Leonidas (sister); Georgina Leonidas (sister)

Dimitri Leonidas (born 14 November 1987) is an English actor, best known for his roles in the films The Monuments Men, and Rosewater (both 2014) and the television series Riviera (2017–2020).

== Early life ==
Leonidas was born on 14 November 1987 in Brent, London, the son of a Greek Cypriot father and an English mother. He also has Welsh ancestry through his mother. He has three sisters: Stephanie and Georgina, both actresses, and Helena, a teacher.

== Career ==
Leonidas first appeared in a film in 1997, as an extra in Charles Sturridge's FairyTale: A True Story. His first speaking part came in 2001 in the BBC series Grange Hill, in which he stayed for four seasons. Until 2008, he was credited mostly as Shane Leonidas.

In 2009, he co-starred in the teen horror Tormented, and in 2010 he appeared in Centurion, starring Michael Fassbender. In the following years, his works included the TV series Sinbad, a guest role in Doctor Who and the Spanish film Animals.

Leonidas had a breakthrough year in 2013: he was cast by George Clooney in his Second World War drama The Monuments Men, starring Clooney himself, Matt Damon, Bill Murray and Cate Blanchett. He also landed a role in Jon Stewart's Rosewater. This led him to be named as one of Screen International's Stars of Tomorrow.

In 2015, Leonidas had a brief role in the Emmy-nominated television film Killing Jesus. He then appeared in the action film Renegades and in the comedy-horror film Kill Ben Lyk. From 2017 to 2020, he was part of the cast of the series Riviera, followed by a role in the 2021 Netflix science fiction/crime-drama The One. In 2023, he played the role of Hober Mallow in season two of the Apple TV+ science fiction series Foundation. Leonidas starred as Scorpus in the 2024 historical drama series Those About to Die.

== Filmography ==
=== Film ===
| Year | Title | Role | Notes |
|---|---|---|---|
| 1997 | FairyTale: A True Story | —N/a | Extra |
| 2009 | Tormented | Alex | |
| 2010 | Centurion | Leonidas | |
| 2012 | Animals | Mark | |
| 2014 | The Monuments Men | Sam Epstein | |
| 2014 | Rosewater | Davood | |
| 2017 | Renegades | Jack Porter | |
| 2018 | Kill Ben Lyk | Roberto | |

=== Television ===
| Year | Title | Role | Notes |
|---|---|---|---|
| 2001 | Casualty | Ross | Episode: "Heroes and Villains" |
| 2001–2004 | Grange Hill | Josh Irvine | Television debut: 23 January 2001 |
| 2002 | The Bill | Josh Harvey | Episode: "Honeytrap" |
| 2005 | The Bill | Ryan Greaves | Episode: "Word to the Wise" |
| 2007 | Holby City | Jez Patterson | Episode: "I Feel Pretty" |
| 2007 | Doctors | Mike Andreus | Episode: "Chemistry" |
| 2008 | Banged Up Abroad | Scott White | Episode: "Kuwait" |
| 2011 | Hustle | Pete Wilson | Episode: "The Fall of Railton FC" |
| 2011 | Doctor Who | Howie Spragg | Episode: "The God Complex" |
| 2012 | Sinbad | Anwar | 12 episodes |
| 2015 | Killing Jesus | James | Television film |
| 2017–2020 | Riviera | Christos Clios | 21 episodes |
| 2018 | Genius | Kostas Axelos | Episode: "Picasso: Chapter Nine" |
| 2021 | The One | James Whiting | 8 episodes |
| 2023 | Foundation | Hober Mallow | Season 2; 7 episodes |
| 2024 | Masters of the Air | Sgt. George J. Petrohelos | Miniseries, episode: "Part Five" |
| 2024 | Those About to Die | Scorpus | 10 episodes |
| 2026 | The Split Up | Luke Christos | |

=== Theatre ===
| Year | Title | Role | Notes |
|---|---|---|---|
| 2010 | Through a Glass Darkly | Max | |
