= Centurion (film) =

2010 French-British historical action film

- Theatrical release poster
- Directed by: Neil Marshall
- Written by: Neil Marshall
- Produced by: Christian Colson; Robert Jones
- Starring: Michael Fassbender; Dominic West; Olga Kurylenko; Noel Clarke; Liam Cunningham; David Morrissey; Riz Ahmed; JJ Feild; Dimitri Leonidas; Imogen Poots; Ulrich Thomsen
- Cinematography: Sam McCurdy
- Edited by: Chris Gill
- Music by: Ilan Eshkeri
- Production companies: Pathé; UK Film Council; Celador Films; Canal+
- Distributed by: Warner Bros. Entertainment UK
- Release dates: 15 February 2010 (Austin Asian Film Festival); 23 April 2010
- Running time: 97 minutes
- Countries: United Kingdom; United States; France
- Languages: English; Gaelic
- Budget: $12–15 million
- Box office: $7.9 million

Centurion is a 2010 British historical action film written and directed by Neil Marshall, loosely based on the disappearance of the Roman Empire's Ninth Legion in Caledonia in the early second century AD. The film stars Michael Fassbender, Dominic West and Olga Kurylenko. It received mixed reviews and performed poorly at the box office, earning $7.9 million against a $12–15 million budget.

== Plot ==
The Roman Empire has been unable to fully conquer Britain, reaching a harsh stalemate in the North. The Picts engage in guerrilla warfare against the Romans along the Glenblocker forts and the Gask Ridge at the southern border of the Scottish Highlands. At the Roman outpost of Pinnata Castra, Pict warriors led by Vortix and Aeron kill the entire garrison, taking only the second-in-command, Centurion Quintus Dias, because he can speak the Pictish language. Brought before Pict king Gorlacon, who has united the northern tribes, Dias is brutally interrogated, but escapes on foot.

A messenger from the fort reaches Gnaeus Julius Agricola, Roman governor of Britannia, who hopes to obtain favour with the Roman Senate and transfer back to the comforts of Rome. He dispatches the Ninth Legion under General Titus Flavius Virilus to eradicate the Pict threat, providing him with a Celtic Brigantian scout, Etain. Marching north, the legion rescues Dias from his pursuers.

Etain leads them into an ambush where, surprised by flaming pitch-wood 'boulders', they are massacred and the wounded Virilus is captured. The few survivors – Dias, the legionaries Bothos, Thax, Brick, Macros and Leonidas, and the cook Tarak – set out to rescue Virilus, finding him at Gorlacon's village. Sneaking in at nightfall, they are unable to break his chains, and he orders them to return to Roman territory without him. In Gorlacon's hut, Thax suffocates the king's young son to prevent him giving them away.

The next morning, Gorlacon burns his son's body on a funeral pyre and forces Virilus to fight Etain, who as a child witnessed her parents raped and slaughtered by the Romans; she kills him with a spear through the heart. Gorlacon sends her after the legionaries at the head of a group of mounted warriors, including Vortix and Aeron, to avenge his son's death.

The Romans plan to travel north away from Roman territory, to throw the Picts off their trail, then head west and back south. After several days' pursuit, the Picts continually catch up with the fugitives, who jump off a cliff into a river to escape them; Tarak is killed before he can jump, and Macros and Thax become separated from the others. Dias' group camp for the night while their pursuers camp across the river. Dias and Brick raid the enemy camp, killing two men and wounding a third, who reveals they are being pursued because of the death of Gorlacon's son, which Thax had kept secret. Etain has launched her own attack on the Romans, and Dias and Brick return to discover Leonidas dead and Bothos wounded.

Meanwhile, Macros and Thax have washed up further down river. The two encounter a wolf pack and end up running. When Thax falls Macros returns to help him, only for Thax to cut his Achilles tendon and leave him to the wolves.

Dias, Bothos, and Brick find the forest hut of Arianne, an exiled Briton accused of witchcraft who learned Latin from a nearby Roman outpost. She gives them shelter, food, and medical attention for Bothos. When Etain and her warriors arrive, Arianne hides the Romans under her floorboards. When Bothos, Dias, and Brick leave Arianne's in the morning; Arianne, having become fond of Dias, is saddened to see him go.

They find the outpost abandoned, with an order declaring that the Roman troops have retreated south by order of Emperor Hadrian. Seeing Etain's warriors approaching and tired of running, they set up a defensive position inside the fort. Brick is killed, as are Vortix, Aeron, and the rest of the Britons, with Dias finally killing Etain.

Taking the Picts' horses, Dias and Bothos continue south, reuniting with Thax. Reaching Hadrian's Wall, now under construction, Thax threatens Dias, afraid he will report his dishonourable actions. They fight, with Dias choking Thax to death. Bothos, joyfully riding toward the Romans, is mistaken for a charging Pict and shot by an archer. Devastated, Dias reports to Agricola, who worries that news of the legion's annihilation will lead other tribes to revolt. Fearful of his reputation being tainted by a military failure, he decides the Ninth Legion's fate should remain a mystery and Dias must be silenced. Dias foils the attempt on his life by Agricola's daughter Drusilla. Badly wounded in the thigh, he knocks Drusilla unconscious and escapes from the camp, returning to Arianne in the forest. The film ends with Arianne kissing him after he falls from his horse.

== Cast ==
- Michael Fassbender as Quintus Dias, a centurion. His father was Scipio Dias, a renowned and later freed gladiator. Formerly the second-in-command at the Inchtuthil garrison, Quintus is the only survivor of the fort and the only Roman to escape King Gorlacon. Quintus joins the Ninth Legion's march into Caledonia and is later betrayed by Governor Agricola.
- Olga Kurylenko as Etain, a warrior, scout, hunter and tracker from the Brigantes tribe. After seeing her family raped and murdered by the Romans, Etain was raped herself and had her tongue cut out. She fled north and was taken in by the Picts, who trained her and sent her back to the Romans as a spy. Marshall said of the character, "Etain is kind of revenge incarnate. Her family were butchered by the Romans, she had her tongue cut out by the Romans, she's had a hell of a time and she's out for Roman blood ... She's quite furious because one sense is not there – she can’t speak – all the others are more developed. She sees very well and hears very well: she is an animal!"
- Dominic West as Titus Flavius Virilus, the general (legate) of the Ninth Legion. Virilus is a tough veteran, far more comfortable with the ordinary soldiers, who would follow him anywhere, than with his fellow patricians.
- Liam Cunningham as Brick (Ubriculius), a veteran legionary of the Ninth Legion. He is on his last tour before settling down on a farm in Tuscany.
- David Morrissey as Bothos, a veteran legionary in Septus's century of the Ninth Legion. He joined the army as an orphan on the streets of Rome.
- JJ Feild as Thax, a self-serving legionary in Septus's century of the Ninth Legion.
- Noel Clarke as Macros, a legionary of the second cohort of the Ninth Legion. Originally from Numidia, he was a noted marathon runner in Greece before joining the army.
- Riz Ahmed as Tarak, a cook with the Ninth Legion.
- Dimitri Leonidas as Leonidas, a Greek legionary scout of the Ninth Legion.
- Ulrich Thomsen as Gorlacon, the leader of the Britons.
- Imogen Poots as Arianne, a young Briton woman exiled for witchcraft by Gorlacon.
- Lee Ross as Septus, a veteran centurion of the Ninth Legion and an old friend of General Virilus.
- Dave Legeno as Vortix, an axe-wielding Briton warrior.
- Axelle Carolyn as Aeron, a Briton archer.
- Paul Freeman as Gnaeus Julius Agricola, Roman governor of Britannia. This is an anachronism; the historical Julius Agricola was actually governor some 30 years before the events depicted in the film, and was already dead by the time Hadrian's Wall began construction. The governor at the time of the Pictish war, the disappearance of the Ninth Legion and the beginning of the construction of Hadrian's Wall in 119 AD was actually Quintus Pompeius Falco.
- Rachael Stirling as Drusilla, Governor Agricola's daughter.
- Michael Carter as Antoninus, one of Agricola's generals.
- Tom Mannion as Tesio, one of Agricola's generals.
- Peter Guinness as Cassius, one of Agricola's generals.
- Jake Maskall as Argos, an officer of the Ninth Legion, one of General Virilus's aides.
- Eoin Macken as Achivir, a Briton warrior.
- Neil Marshall as Archer on Hadrian's Fort, an uncredited cameo as the watchman who mistakes Bothos for a Pict.

== Production ==
Centurion was written originally by director Neil Marshall under the working title Ninth Legion. The Ninth Legion, according to one legend, marched into Scotland from York with over 3,000 men and disappeared. In recent years, historians have disputed the fate of the legion; some believe they were disbanded, while others believe they were massacred in Germania or in the East fighting the Persians during the early years of the second century. Marshall said of his take of the story, "It's not meant to be historically perfect. I'm picking up on a legend and exploring it... it's an action thriller." The tide of academic opinion seems to be returning to the view that the Legion was probably wiped out in Britain. In a recent book, Dr Miles Russell of Bournemouth University observes that there is strong evidence for a catastrophic British war resulting in the annihilation of the legion early in the reign of Hadrian.

Filming began towards the end of February 2009. Filming locations included the Scottish locations Badenoch, Strathspey, and Glenfeshie Estate in the Cairngorms. Filming also took place at Ealing Studios in London and in Surrey locations, such as Alice Holt Forest and Hurtwood Forest in the Surrey Hills. Historical re-enactment groups were enlisted to play Britions and Roman soldiers in the practical filming at Badenoch and Strathspey. Filming was completed in March, after seven weeks. Production design was by Simon Bowles, with art direction by Jason Knox-Johnston. The sets were built by DRS Construction.

The film was screened on 18 March 2010 at the South by Southwest Film Festival as the "Super Secret TBD" film. It was also the opening night premiere for the inaugural ActionFest film festival. The film was released on 30 July 2010 as video on demand on the Xbox Live Marketplace and Amazon.

== Reception ==
On Rotten Tomatoes, the film holds an approval rating of 60% based on 113 reviews, and an average rating of 5.5/10. The website's critical consensus reads, "It's a bloody geyser of Neil Marshall's typically stylish B-movie action, but Centurion is too focused on hacking and slashing to deliver original dialogue or interesting characters." On Metacritic, the film has a weighted average score of 62 out of 100, based on 21 critics, indicating "generally favorable reviews".

The Birmingham Post gave the film two stars out of five saying "this hideously violent, formula one chase movie lacks the novelty of Mel Gibson's Apocalypto". Empire gave the film three stars out of five stating that the film "could have done with a lot more character-meat on those bones." Film4 gave the film two stars out of five stating "It's just a shame none of this stuff was thought through a little more carefully, because there's a talented cast here who have been hung out to dry." The Guardian gave the film two stars out of five stating that "this is exercise-bike cinema: energetic, relentless and tipping towards monotony".

== See also ==
- The Eagle of the Ninth, 1954 historical novel by Rosemary Sutcliff, which first popularised the story of the lost Ninth Legion.
- The Eagle, an unrelated 2011 film that also involves the Ninth Legion.
- List of historical drama films
- Legio IX Hispana
- Survival film
