= Renegades (2017 film) =

- Theatrical release poster
- Directed by: Steven Quale
- Written by: Luc Besson; Richard Wenk
- Produced by: Luc Besson; Raphaël Benoliel
- Starring: Sullivan Stapleton; Charlie Bewley; Alain Blažević; Sylvia Hoeks; Joshua Henry; Andrej Dojkić; Diarmaid Murtagh; Dimitri Leonidas; Clemens Schick; Ewen Bremner; J. K. Simmons
- Cinematography: Brian Pearson
- Edited by: Florent Vassault
- Music by: Éric Serra
- Production companies: EuropaCorp; Studio Babelsberg
- Distributed by: EuropaCorp Distribution (France); Universum Film/Centralfilm (Germany)
- Release dates: September 1, 2017 (Germany); September 6, 2017 (France)
- Running time: 105 minutes
- Countries: France; Germany
- Language: English
- Budget: €66.2 million ($77.5 million)
- Box office: $2.2 million

Renegades, known as American Renegades in the United States, is a 2017 English-language action thriller film directed by Steven Quale and written by Luc Besson and Richard Wenk. The film stars Sullivan Stapleton, J. K. Simmons and Charlie Bewley, and follows a team of Navy SEALs who are asked to salvage Nazi gold stored in a bank vault in a submerged town at the bottom of a Bosnian lake. It was released in Germany on September 1, 2017, and in France on August 29, 2018. It was released on Blu-ray and DVD in the United States on January 22, 2019, by Lionsgate Home Entertainment.

== Plot ==
In August 1944, in Nazi-occupied France, the German military decides to move captured treasure, paintings, and about 25 tons of gold ingots from Paris to a safe location. The gold is then transported to the small Bosnian town of Bosansko Grahovo, where it is put into the bank vault. German forces arrest all the townspeople while a little boy escapes as they execute the townspeople. Yugoslav partisans find the little boy.

In 1995, during the Bosnian war, a team of U.S. Navy SEALs disguised as journalists leads a covert operation to successfully capture and extract Bosnian Serb General Milić, who is responsible for numerous atrocities against ethnic minorities in Sarajevo. However, the team is compromised and is forced to escape from his second-in-command Petrović and the pursuing Serbs in a tank, causing extensive damage throughout the city. Back in the base, the team is reprimanded by their commanding officer, Rear Admiral J. Levin, for their actions and put on a three-day leave. A team member, Stanton Baker, has a romantic interest in a local waitress, Lara. After spending a night together, a couple of thugs led by Lara's brother Milenko enter and demand something from her. Luckily, Stallon's team leader, Matt Barnes, arrives to fight off the thugs, and Lara then reveals that the thugs are after the gold ingot she is keeping, worth about $150,000.

She explains that her grandfather was the little boy who survived the civilian massacre in Grahovo by German forces. He stole a gold ingot and buried it before he was found by the partisans who blew up the nearby dam and flooded the town as revenge for the massacre. Her grandfather retrieved the gold and shared his story with her. She reveals that there were at least 2,000 gold ingots worth at least $300 million, which would help her benefit the Bosnian people to rebuild their war-torn country. She found the vault, but the lake was miles behind enemy territory controlled by Petrović, who has been attacking NATO forces hunting the SEAL team.

Despite being ordered to be sent home for their safety, the team decides to retrieve the gold. Using their connections inside the base and around the nearby town, they obtain the necessary equipment and transport it to the lake. Meanwhile, Milenko and his thugs search her flat, find the gold, and show it to Petrović, who decides to stop the SEAL team from extracting it. He learns the location from Lara's map.

The SEAL team and Lara establish an air pocket inside a church and break into the vault, only to discover that it contains only ten gold ingots. However, Barnes finds a covered opening in a wall where the remaining gold is hidden. They then transport the gold to the surface using an air-filled cargo parachute. Petrović and his forces arrive at the lake and send divers after them before sending grenades to explode below and force them to the surface.

Petrović and the Serbian forces corner the team and Lara. However, a U.S. Navy Super Stallion, sent by Levin, arrives just in time to defeat the enemy and kill Petrović. The team extracts the gold and is safely flown back to base. Levin confronts the team for breaking military regulations but decides not to punish them because they did manage to kill Petrović.

The President of France awards Lara with the Legion of Honour. Half of the gold is returned to France, while the other half is sold anonymously. The money is distributed to the team, with Lara receiving most of the sum. However, the team members decide to give Lara their shares and head to the bar in celebration.

== Cast ==
- Sullivan Stapleton as Matt Barnes
- J. K. Simmons as Rear Admiral J. Levin
- Charlie Bewley as Stanton Baker
- Clemens Schick as Petrović
- Diarmaid Murtagh as Kurt Duffy
- Alain Blažević as Boris
- Sylvia Hoeks as Lara Simić
- Joshua Henry as Ben Moran
- Dimitri Leonidas as Jack Porter
- Ewen Bremner as Jim Rainey
- Peter Davor as General Milić

== Production ==
On September 30, 2014, it was announced that EuropaCorp had hired Steven Quale to direct the Navy SEALs action thriller The Lake from a screenplay written by Luc Besson and Richard Wenk. On March 2, 2015, Sullivan Stapleton was set to play the lead role. J. K. Simmons, Charlie Bewley and Diarmaid Murtagh were added to the cast of the film. Sylvia Hoeks, Joshua Henry and Dimitri Leonidas also joined the cast of the film.

Filming began on April 30, 2015. It took place in Croatia (in Hum, Karlovac, Ogulin and Zagreb, and at the Lokve and Čiče lakes), Germany and Malta.

The film received funds of €5 million, from the German Federal Film Fund (DFFF), as well as €275,000 from the Bavarian Film Fund (FFF Bayern).

== Release ==
In March 2015, EuropaCorp set the film for a July 15, 2016 release. In February 2016, the film was pushed back to January 20, 2017. In May 2016, the film was pushed back to January 27, 2017, and again in early November 2016 pushed to February 3, 2017, and the title of the film was changed to Renegades. In January 2017, the film was pushed back again to September 1, 2017. In July, the film was moved from September 1, 2017, to an undetermined release date. Lionsgate Home Entertainment released the film on Blu-ray and DVD on January 22, 2019, under the title American Renegades.

== Reception ==
=== Box office ===
Renegades has grossed $2.2 million worldwide against a production budget of $77.5 million.

=== Critical response ===
On review aggregator website Rotten Tomatoes, the film holds a 11% rating based on 19 reviews, with an average rating of 4.2/10.

Renegades was panned by critics for its far-fetched narrative, script, "gung-ho" themes, and lack of action. Several critics compared the film unfavourably to the 1980s action television series The A-Team. However, the performance of J.K. Simmons was praised.

== See also ==
- List of films featuring the United States Navy SEALs
- Three Kings, A 1999 movie about a gold heist in a 1990s conflict
