= Riviera (TV series) =

Irish-British drama television series (2017–2020)

- Created by: Neil Jordan
- Based on: An idea by Paul McGuinness
- Starring: Anthony LaPaglia; Julia Stiles; Lena Olin; Adrian Lester; Iwan Rheon; Roxane Duran; Dimitri Leonidas; Igal Naor
- Opening theme: "Was It Love?" by Isabella 'Machine' Summers
- Countries of origin: United Kingdom; Ireland
- Original language: English (and French)
- No. of series: 3
- No. of episodes: 28

Production
- Executive producers: Neil Jordan; Liza Marshall; Kris Thykier; Paul McGuinness
- Running time: 41–50 minutes
- Production companies: Archery Pictures; Primo Productions

Original release
- Network: Sky Atlantic
- Release: 15 June 2017 – 3 December 2020

Riviera is an Irish-British drama television series originally created by Neil Jordan, who however disowned it as finally released. It premiered on Sky Atlantic on 15 June 2017. The series stars Anthony LaPaglia, Julia Stiles, Lena Olin, Adrian Lester, Iwan Rheon, Dimitri Leonidas, Igal Naor, and Roxane Duran. The first season of Riviera was released on 15 June 2017 on Sky Box Sets and NOW TV, and was Sky's most successful original series, with an audience of 2.3 million an episode, and more than 20 million downloads and views total. The first season premiered in the U.S. on 9 February 2019 on Ovation. The second season premiered on the network beginning on May 8, 2021 as part of the "Mystery Alley" block in a deal with Sky Studios. The second season was announced on 21 November 2017. It was renewed for a third and last season on 24 May 2019.

== Synopsis ==
Set in the French Riviera, the series follows American art curator Georgina Clios, whose life is upended after her billionaire husband Constantine dies in a yacht accident. Georgina becomes immersed in a world of lies, double-dealing and crime, as she seeks to uncover the truth about her husband's death.

== Cast and characters ==
=== Main ===
- Julia Stiles as Georgina Marjorie Clios (née Ryland), an American art curator, and second wife of Constantine
- Anthony LaPaglia as Constantine Clios, a billionaire banker and philanthropist who dies in a yacht accident (series 1–2)
- Lena Olin as Irina Atman Clios, Constantine's first wife (series 1–2)
- Dimitri Leonidas as Christos Clios, Constantine and Irina's youngest son, who becomes the head of the Clios business empire (series 1–2)
- Roxane Duran as Adriana Clios, Constantine and Irina's daughter (series 1–2)
- Igal Naor as Jakob Negrescu, Constantine's former head of security who has links with drugs, prostitution and gambling (series 1–2)
- Poppy Delevingne as Daphne Al-Qadar, Cassandra's daughter and Nico's twin sister, who is married to Raafi Al-Qadar (series 2–3)
- Jack Fox as Nico Eltham, Cassandra's son and Daphne's twin brother (series 2–3)

=== Series 1 ===
- Adrian Lester as Robert Carver; an art dealer and friend of Georgina, who deals in forgeries and stolen artwork
- Iwan Rheon as Adam Clios; Constantine and Irina's eldest son, who rejects his family's extravagant lifestyle
- Phil Davis as Jukes; a British art fraud investigator working in the Serious Financial Crime Agency of Interpol
- Amr Waked as Karim Delormes; an inspector in the Nice police force

=== Series 2 ===
- Juliet Stevenson as Lady Cassandra Eltham; head of the prestigious Eltham dynasty
- Will Arnett as Jeff Carter; Georgina's uncle
- Grégory Fitoussi as Noah Levy; an ex-soldier and pilot-for-hire, and love interest of Georgina
- Alex Lanipekun as Raafi Al-Qadar; a wealthy philanthropist and businessman, married to Daphne Eltham
- Mark Holden as Martin Sinclair; private investigator, hired by Irina

=== Series 3 ===
- Rupert Graves as Gabriel Hirsch, an antiquities recovery expert and new ally of Georgina
- Clare-Hope Ashitey as Ellen Swann, Chief of Staff to Alexandra Harewood
- Synnøve Macody Lund as Alexandra Harewood, a technology billionaire who is founder and CEO of Harewood Technologies
- Gabriel Corrado as Victor Alsina-Suarez, the Mayor of Buenos Aires who is in league with Alexandra Harewood
- Franco Masini as Cesar Alsina-Suarez, the younger son of Victor who undertakes illicit activities on behalf of his father
- Eliseo Barrionuevo as Dario Alsina-Suarez, the elder son of Victor and his designated successor

== Episodes ==
=== Series overview ===
| Series | Episodes | Originally released | |
| Series | Episodes | First released | Last released |
|---|---|---|---|
| 1 | 10 | 15 June 2017 | 17 August 2017 |
| 2 | 10 | 23 May 2019 | 18 July 2019 |
| 3 | 8 | 15 October 2020 | 3 December 2020 |

=== Season 1 (2017) ===
Note: Every episode was available in the United Kingdom by download from Sky "catch up" following the first episode satellite broadcast.

| No. overall | No. in series | Français title | English title | Directed by | Written by | Original release date | UK viewers (millions) |
|---|---|---|---|---|---|---|---|
| 1 | 1 | "Villa Carmella" | Villa Carmella | Philipp Kadelbach | Neil Jordan & John Banville | 15 June 2017 | 1.19 |
After newlywed Georgina's billionaire husband Constantine is killed in a yacht explosion, she is shocked to discover the fortune and lifestyle he maintained was surrounded by violence, lies and drugs. She soon must step out of her comfort zone to protect the family and herself.
| 2 | 2 | "Faussaires" | Counterfeiters | Philipp Kadelbach | Neil Jordan & John Banville | 22 June 2017 | 1.01 |
Georgina is informed that Constantine's dealings are under investigation by Interpol, while Irina makes a deal with a prominent figure in the Riviera underworld.
| 3 | 3 | "La chambre secrète" | The Secret Room | Damon Thomas | Lydia Adetunji | 29 June 2017 | 0.78 |
Georgina searches for answers by reviewing Constantine's movements on the day of the explosion. Christos's hedonistic behaviour spirals out of control.
| 4 | 4 | "Tableaux de famille" | Family Paintings | Damon Thomas | Christopher Smith | 6 July 2017 | 0.58 |
Following her discovery in the safe room, Georgina attempts to track down her husband's elusive art collector. Delormes finds a way to bring Negrescu (Igal Naor) to justice.
| 5 | 5 | "Elena" | Elena | Hans Herbots | Stacey Gregg | 13 July 2017 | 0.61 |
A frustrated Georgina uses the Clios Foundation's lavish gala as an opportunity to pin down a person of interest, but the party receives an uninvited guest.
| 6 | 6 | "Travail d'artiste" | Artist's Work | Foz Allen | Stacey Gregg | 20 July 2017 | 0.49 |
The Clios family are questioned by police after the events of the gala. Meanwhile, Delormes uncovers wreckage from the yacht that may change everything.
| 7 | 7 | "Le Don" | The Gift | Adrian Lester | Lydia Adetunj | 27 July 2017 | 0.53 |
With Interpol's net closing in on Georgina, she and Carver set out to close the investigation once and for all. Irina reveals a family secret to Negrescu.
| 8 | 8 | "La Clé" | The Key | Paul Norton Walker | Guy Burt | 3 August 2017 | 0.36 |
Georgina must join forces with an unlikely ally when she receives a threat from a stranger. Christos's rehab goes well, but a new relationship puts him in danger.
| 9 | 9 | "Œil pour œil" | An Eye for an Eye | Paul Norton Walker | Guy Burt | 10 August 2017 | 0.32 |
To keep her family safe, Georgina crosses a line she can never return from. Delormes uncovers the identity of his opponent and attempts to take them down.
| 10 | 10 | "À la vue de tous" | For All to See | Paul Norton Walker | Guy Burt & Sophie Petzal | 17 August 2017 | 0.36 |
In the face of tragedy, Georgina resolves to free her family from danger and faces her opponents head-on.

=== Season 2 (2019) ===
Note: Every episode was available in the United Kingdom by download from Sky "catch up" following the first episode satellite broadcast.

| No. overall | No. in series | Français title | English title | Directed by | Written by | Original release date | UK viewers (millions) |
|---|---|---|---|---|---|---|---|
| 11 | 1 | "J'ai vu ce que tu as fait" | I Saw What you Did | Hans Herbots | Gabbie Asher | 23 May 2019 | N/A |
Caught in the eye of a torrential rainstorm hours after disposing of Adam's body, a distressed Georgina is pulled from the sea by Raafi Al-Qadar, a wealthy businessman on honeymoon with his wife Daphne. Daphne befriends Georgina and offers to help her salvage her boat once the storm passes. Raoul (Merveille Lukeba), an art prodigy nurtured from a young age by the Clios foundation, later invites Georgina to an exhibition of his latest work, only for her to find his lifeless body just hours later.
| 12 | 2 | "Révélations" | Revelations | Hans Herbots | Gabbie Asher | 23 May 2019 | N/A |
Christos chairs the first meeting of the Clios bank's shareholders as CEO, but is warned that only his resignation to allow a new figurehead to take over the reins will secure the bank's future. Georgina is taken aback when the police arrive to question Daphne and Nico over the death of Raoul. Irina begins to become increasingly suspicious of Georgina's involvement in Adam's disappearance. Lady Cassandra continues to hide a devastating secret from the rest of her family.
| 13 | 3 | "À travers les portes closes" | Through the Closed Doors | Hans Herbots | Matt Evans | 30 May 2019 | N/A |
Georgina returns home to New York for her father's funeral, with a skeptical Irina and Adriana in tow, who are determined to find out why she claimed her father died years ago. With the help of her uncle Jeff (Will Arnett), Georgina tries to unravel the truth about what really happened to her mother twenty-five years ago. Irina seizes the opportunity to arrange for a private detective to look into Adam's disappearance, while Christos goes head-to-head with Raafi for the ownership of a championship-winning racehorse.
| 14 | 4 | "Renaissance" | Renaissance | Paul Norton Walker | Steve Bailie | 6 June 2019 | N/A |
Irina and Georgina come head to head when a body wrapped in a sail bag washes ashore. Unable to keep her silence any longer, Georgina finally reveals the truth about what happened to Adam - but warns Irina that revealing the truth may destroy what little is left of the Clios empire. Christos is delighted when Raafi agrees to come on board as the bank's new investor. Adriana visits her father in prison, determined to find out what has really happened to Adam.
| 15 | 5 | "Triste anniversaire" | Sad Birthday | Paul Norton Walker | Steve Bailie | 13 June 2019 | N/A |
Georgina and Noah continue the search for the stolen Vermeer, with a little help from Georgina's contacts on the black market. Irina informs the family of her decision to declare Adam officially missing. Adriana's 18th birthday celebrations are overcast when Christos collapses after having his drink spiked by Nico. Georgina and Noah speak with an underworld art collector who shows them photographs which suggest the Vermeer may be located somewhere in the grounds of the Eltham's estate.
| 16 | 6 | "Remords" | Remorse | Paul Norton Walker | Damian Wayling | 20 June 2019 | N/A |
Pressured, Georgina confesses the truth to Jeff. Cassandra's secret finally gets out and Georgina comes face to face with Constantine.
| 17 | 7 | "Sur les ruines de nos rêves" | On the Ruins of our Dreams | Destiny Ekaragha | Liz Lake | 27 June 2019 | N/A |
Georgina uses Raoul's memorial to channel her grief over Constantine's sudden death, while a newly-motivated Nico sets his sights on the Clios empire.
| 18 | 8 | "Mises au point" | Developed | Destiny Ekaragha | Matt Evans | 4 July 2019 | N/A |
Desperate to turn the tables on Nico, Georgina and Jeff follow a drug trail.
| 19 | 9 | "Sur le chemin de la vérité" | On the Way to Truth | Hans Herbots | Matt Evans | 11 July 2019 | N/A |
Jeff's loyalty to Georgina is pushed to its limit, while Irina threatens to crack under pressure as the family's suspicions grow.
| 20 | 10 | "L'Eau et le feu..." | Water and Fire... | Hans Herbots | Gabbie Asher | 18 July 2019 | N/A |
Georgina's world, and own nature, come undone as sins are revealed at last.

=== Season 3 (2020) ===
Note: Every episode was available in the United Kingdom by download from Sky "catch up" following the first episode satellite broadcast.

| No. overall | No. in series | Français title | English title | Directed by | Written by | Original release date | UK viewers (millions) |
|---|---|---|---|---|---|---|---|
| 21 | 1 | "La Dolce Vita" | The Good Life | Paul Norton Walker | John Jackson | 15 October 2020 | N/A |
While Georgina attempts to restore order to her life by reinventing herself as an art restitution lecturer, noted expert Gabriel Hirsch has other ideas.
| 22 | 2 | "Le mistral" | The Mistral | Paul Norton Walker | John Jackson | 22 October 2020 | N/A |
Georgina is mugged and races after the thief. There's a shock in store for Georgina when she comes face to face with old friends - and foes - as she and Gabriel try to uncover the truth about the relationship between Alex and Victor, and the importance of the rosary.
| 23 | 3 | "Ce qui tombe à l'eau" | What falls into the water | Paul Norton Walker | Matt Evans | 29 October 2020 | N/A |
Georgina and Gabriel interrogate a hungover Cesar about Tomas Castillo. Later, Georgina runs into trouble with Ellen when visiting Alex.
| 24 | 4 | "Coup de grâce" | Coup de grace | Sarah Harding | Matt Evans | 5 November 2020 | N/A |
Georgina wakes up in a remote psychiatric unit, owned by Alex. Convinced she's been put there because she knows too much, she protests - but to no avail. An increasingly anxious Gabriel asks Daphne to help him to report Georgina's disappearance.
| 25 | 5 | "Deux tombes" | Two graves | Sarah Harding | Steve Bailie | 12 November 2020 | N/A |
Alex is angered to learn that Georgina and Gabriel are on the run – but, with their enemies now all too aware that they're getting closer to the truth, they run deeper into the plot. In Buenos Aires, Victor and Dario are delighted to have Cesar back in one piece.
| 26 | 6 | "Oui nous pouvons" | Yes We Can | Óskar Thór Axelsson | Damian Wayling | 19 November 2020 | N/A |
It's election day in Buenos Aires and corrupt mayor Victor is hellbent on securing another term in office with one last chance to persuade the city to vote for him. Georgina and Gabriel are determined to topple the conspiracy when they are blindsided by revelations from a very unexpected quarter. Meanwhile, Daphne is confronted by Georgina.
| 27 | 7 | "Oeil pour oeil" | An eye for an eye | Óskar Thór Axelsson | Catherine Tregenna | 26 November 2020 | N/A |
The fallout from the drive-by shootings on the red carpet at Victor's party send shockwaves through Buenos Aires as well as takes an emotional toll on Georgina and Gabriel, and their friendship.
| 28 | 8 | "Réduire au silence" | Silence | Óskar Thór Axelsson | Steve Bailie | 3 December 2020 | N/A |
It's a race against time for Georgina and Gabriel, who must use all their strength and cunning to escape. What does their future hold?

== Production ==
Neil Jordan has disowned Riviera, due to his scripts being reworked by others. He says he has no idea who rewrote these episodes. "They were changed, to my huge surprise and considerable upset. There were various sexual scenes introduced into the story and a lot of very expository dialogue. I objected in the strongest terms possible."

Filming for season 1 began in August 2016 in the South of France until February 2017. The Clios' lavish "Villa Carmella" estate was filmed at the Chateau Diter in the Cote d'Azur. In a 2018 interview, Sophie Petzal explained she had been brought in to the rewrite the finale. The first episode of the series debuted at the MIPTV Media Market event in Cannes on 3 April 2017.

Filming for season 2 started on 21 May 2018 to September 2018 in the Cote d'Azur, Monza, Nice, and Monaco for a 2019 release. Joining the show are Will Arnett, Juliet Stevenson, Poppy Delevingne, Jack Fox and Grégory Fitoussi, returning cast include Julia Stiles, Lena Olin, Roxane Duran and Dimitri Leonidas.

== Reception ==
=== Ratings ===
Sky stated that first episode of Riviera drew 1.2 million viewers live and on-demand, the largest audience for a Sky original series premiere since Fortitude in 2015. BARB announced official consolidated ratings for the episode as 709,000. Variety reported an audience of 2.3 million an episode, and more than 20 million downloads and views total.

=== Critical response ===
==== Season 1 ====
The Irish Independent's Darragh McManus described the season as an "exceedingly well-crafted soap" that is "beautifully filmed...with a stately pace, top-of-the-range acting talent and some interesting little philosophical musings on the nature of money." Writing for The Guardian, Euan Ferguson wrote "the presences and talents of Julia Stiles, Adrian Lester, Phil Davis and Lena Olin," and called the series "borderline unmissable".

On the other hand, The Telegraph's Michael Hogan gave the first episode three stars out of five, noting that with Academy Award-winner Neil Jordan as the series' creator and Booker Prize-winner John Banville as co-writer, "the script should have soared but was disappointingly pedestrian." The Guardian's Sam Wollaston called the series "awful", concluding that "Riviera might be flashy and moneyed but it lacks personality, charm, humour, soul. It is shallow, vulgar and boring."

==== Season 2 ====
Reviewing the first two episodes, Hogan of The Telegraph gave them two stars, befuddled by the show's success and then declaring "Indeed, amid all the pampered beauties and stubbly playboys, it was hard to find anybody to like, let alone root for. By the end, I was willing that rampaging boar to decimate the lot." Carol Midgley of The Times stated "Riviera is one of those shows about which one could almost write: "So bad it's good." But not quite because it's mostly just bad." This reviewer gave it two stars.

==== Season 3 ====
Carole Midgley of The Times gave the season two out of five stars, stating 'It is a collection of ghastly, charmless people dripping in euro-bling, living obscenely rich lives in places such as Venice and St Tropez, yet who are unhappy because they are not quite rich enough.'.
