= Scorpus =

Roman chariot racer

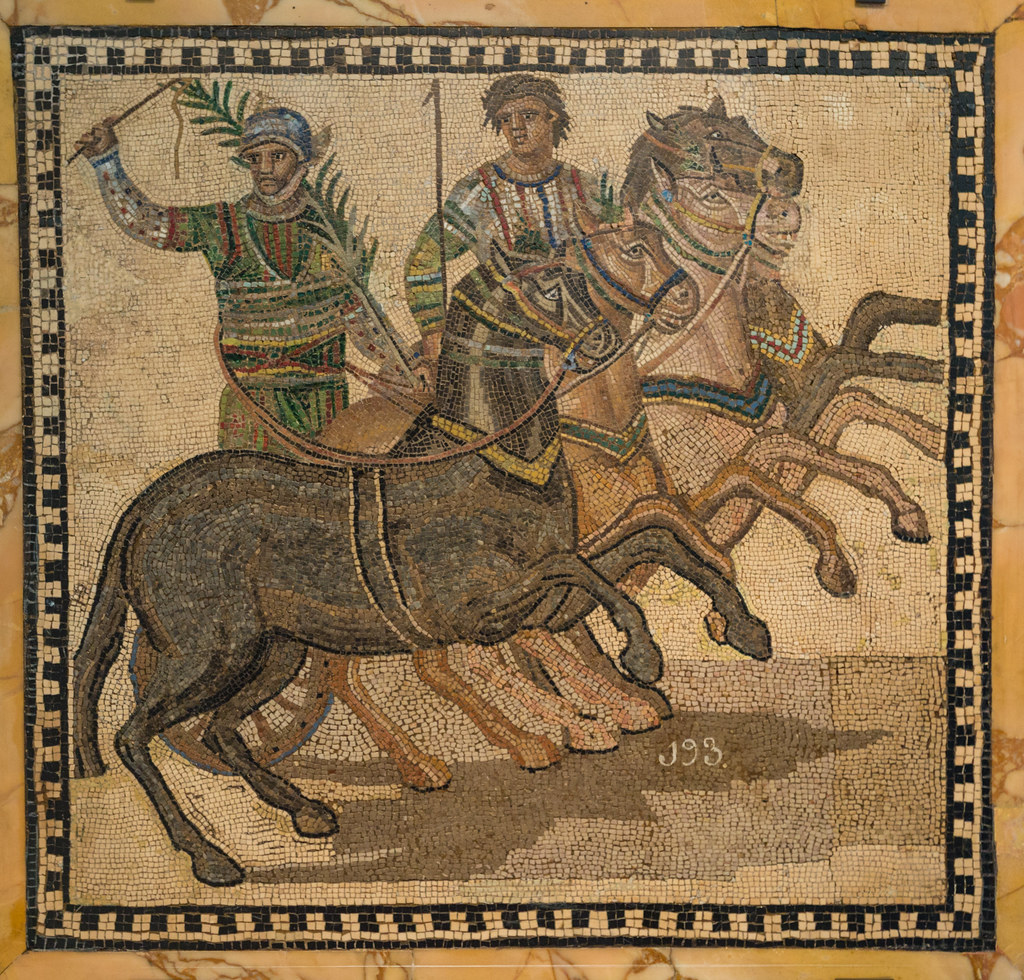
- Mosaic showing victorious charioteer with the victor's palm
- Born: c. 68 AD
- Died: c. 95 AD (age 27); Rome
- Occupation: Charioteer

Flavius Scorpus also known as Scorpius (c. 68–95 AD) was a charioteer in Roman times who lived at the end of the 1st century AD. Scorpus rode for the Green faction during his lifetime and accumulated 2,048 victories. As one of the most famous drivers in Roman history, he earned extraordinarily large amounts of money; his income surpassing that of professional Roman sponsors. Scorpus died young, at 27 years of age.

Scorpus was a slave, as were many charioteers, and was born at Hispania, the nowadays Iberian Peninsula. He received the laurel wreath many times, which is a symbol of continuous victory. Often at the end of a victorious game, fans threw him money. Eventually, he bought his freedom, becoming a libertus (freed slave).

Martial, a Roman poet, refers to Scorpus twice in Book X of his Epigrams, composed between 95 and 98 AD:

Oh! sad misfortune! that you, Scorpus, should be cut off in the flower of your youth, and be called so prematurely to harness the dusky steeds of Pluto. The chariot-race was always shortened by your rapid driving; but O why should your own race have been so speedily run? (10.50)

and

O Rome, I am Scorpus, the glory of your noisy circus, the object of your applause, your short-lived favourite. The envious Lachesis, when she cut me off in my twenty-seventh year, accounted me, in judging by the number of my victories, to be an old man. (10.53)

Although the cause of Scorpus' death is unknown, it is likely to have been in one of the numerous crashes that occurred during chariot races, known as naufragia ("shipwrecks").

== In popular culture ==
Scorpus is portrayed by Dimitri Leonidas in the 2024 historical drama television series Those About to Die.
