= The Order of Time =

The Order of Time may refer to:

- The Order of Time (album), by American singer and songwriter Valerie June
- The Order of Time (book), by Italian theoretical physicist and writer Carlo Rovelli
- The Order of Time (film), by Italian filmmaker Liliana Cavani, freely inspired by Rovelli's book
