= Dinner Party =

Dinner Party or The Dinner Party may refer to:

- A type of party or formal dinner

== Arts and entertainment ==
- Dinner Party (play), by Pier Vittorio Tondelli, 1994
- The Dinner Party (play), by Neil Simon, 2000
- The Dinner Party, a 1979 artwork by Judy Chicago
- "The Dinner Party", a painting by Sam Walsh, inspired by Millais' Pre-Raphaelite painting Isabella

=== Music ===
- Dinner Party, Jazz/hip-hop supergroup, members:
  - Terrace Martin
  - Kamasi Washington
  - Robert Glasper
  - 9th Wonder
- Dinner Party (album), by Niall Horan, 2026
  - "Dinner Party" (song), the title track
- Dinner Party (EP), by Dinner Party, 2020

=== Television episodes ===
- "Dinner Party" (The Brak Show), 2002
- "Dinner Party" (Filthy Rich & Catflap), 1987
- "Dinner Party" (The Office), 2008
- "Dinner Party" (The Ren & Stimpy Show), 1995
- "Dinner Party" (Upload), 2022
- "Dinner Party", a 1999 episode of Frasier
- "The Dinner Party" (Dynasty), 1981
- "The Dinner Party" (The IT Crowd), 2007
- "The Dinner Party" (Miranda), 2013
- "The Dinner Party" (Outnumbered), 2007
- "The Dinner Party" (Seinfeld), 1994
- "The Dinner Party" (The Vampire Diaries), 2011

=== TV & film ===
- Dinner Party, a short film by Lisa Cholodenko
- The Dinner Party (film), 2020
- The Dinner Party (talk show), a live arts talk show hosted by Elysabeth Alfano

== Other uses ==
- The Last Dinner Party, a British rock band, formerly known as the Dinner Party
