= Planck star =

Hypothetical astronomical object

In loop quantum gravity theory, a Planck star is a hypothetical astronomical object, theorized as a compact, exotic star, that exists within a black hole's event horizon, created when the energy density of a collapsing star reaches the Planck energy density. Under these conditions, assuming gravity and spacetime are quantized, a repulsive "force" arises from Heisenberg's uncertainty principle. The accumulation of mass–energy inside the Planck star cannot collapse beyond this limit because it violates the uncertainty principle for spacetime itself.

The key feature of this theoretical object is that this repulsion arises from the energy density, not the Planck length, and starts taking effect far earlier than might be expected. This repulsive "force" is strong enough to stop the star's collapse well before a singularity is formed and, indeed, well before the Planck scale for distance: for a stellar mass black hole the Planck star would be of the order of 10^{−12} m – for a primordial black hole, the order of 10^{−16} m; whilst tiny, these scales are many orders of magnitude larger than the Planck length of 10^{−35} m. Then too, this allows adequate room for all the information captured inside a black hole to be encoded in the star, thus avoiding information loss.

While it might be expected that such a repulsion would act very quickly to reverse the collapse of a star, relativistic effects of the extreme gravity of such an object make such a process extremely languid for external frames of reference. Seen from outside the star's Schwarzschild radius, the rebound of a Planck star takes approximately fourteen billion years, such that even hypothesized primordial black holes would only now be perceptibly displaying rebound.

Carlo Rovelli and Francesca Vidotto, who first proposed the existence of Planck stars, theorized in 2014 that Planck stars form inside black holes as a solution to the black hole firewall and the black hole information paradox. Confirmation of emissions from rebounding black holes could provide evidence for loop quantum gravity. Recent work demonstrates that Planck stars may exist inside black holes as part of a cycle between black and white holes.

A somewhat analogous object theorized under string theory is the fuzzball, which similarly eliminates the singularity within a black hole and accounts for a way to preserve the quantum information that falls into a black hole's event horizon.

== See also ==
- List of nearest black holes
- Supermassive black hole
- Intermediate-mass black hole
- Stellar black hole
- Micro black hole
- Neutron star
- Quasi-star
