= Separate Rooms =

Separate Rooms may refer to:

- Separate Rooms (Our Story (film)), 1984 French film directed by Bertrand Blier
- Separate Rooms (Camere Separate), 1989 Italian novel by Pier Vittorio Tondelli
