= Tea gown =

Woman's at-home dress for informal entertaining

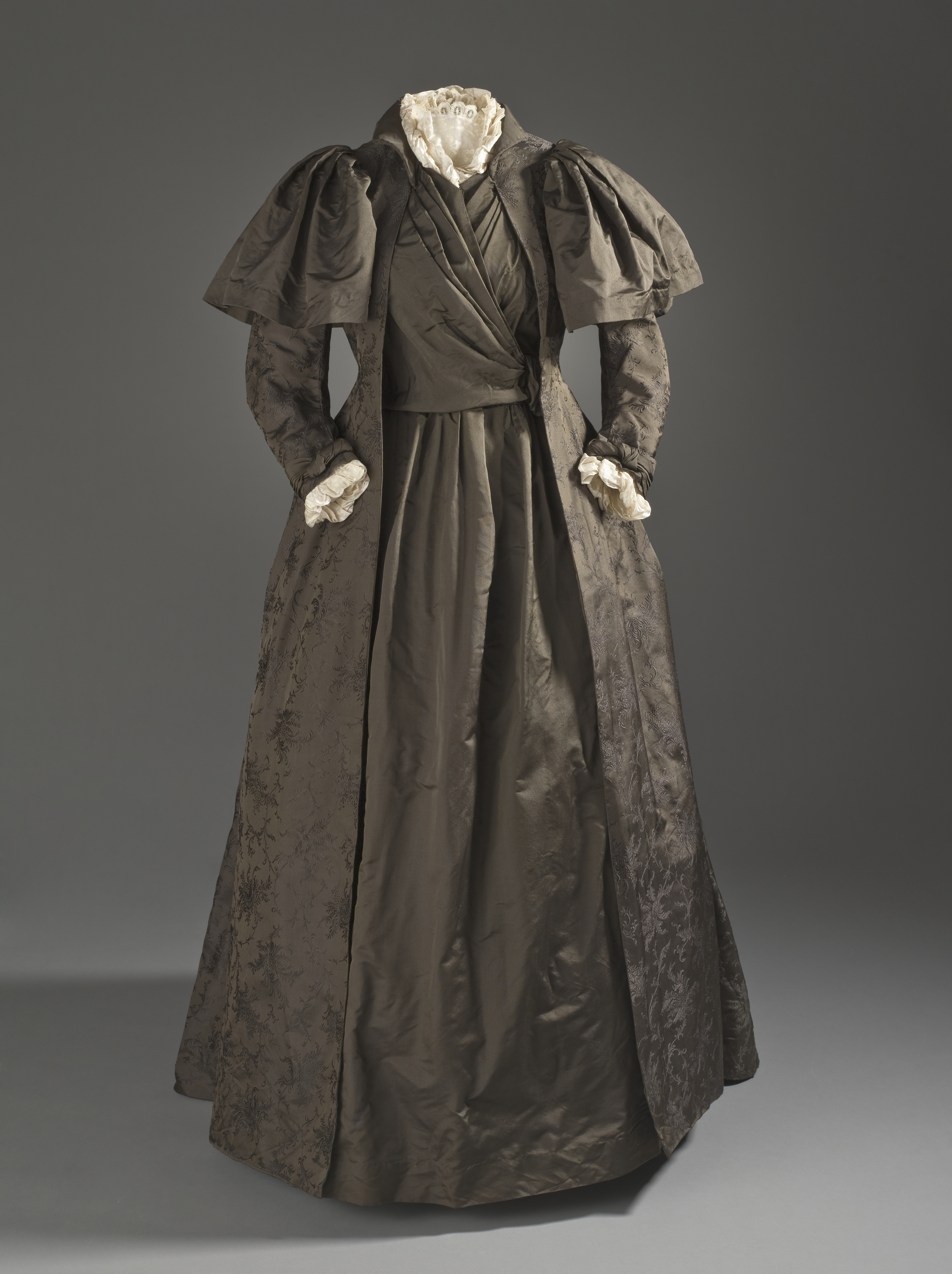
Liberty & Co. tea gown of figured silk twill, c. 1887. Los Angeles County Museum of Art, M.2007.211.901.

A tea gown or tea-gown is a woman's dress for informal entertaining at home. These dresses, which became popular around the mid-19th century, are characterized by unstructured lines and light fabrics. Early tea gowns were a European development influenced by Asian clothing and by European historical fashions such as 18th-century Watteau-pleats and Renaissance hanging sleeves. The Oxford English Dictionary notes the use of the phrase "tea gown" ("[a] special fashion of garment worn by girls and women at tea") from 1878.

Women, as a strict rule, never upon any circumstance would wear a traditional hat or veil whilst inside and consuming tea and cakes in mid-afternoon traditions. Part of this European sense of fashion came from Japanese kimono-etiquette.

Fashion envisaged the wearing of tea gowns without a corset or assistance from a maid; however, elegance always came first.

During the 19th century, etiquette deemed it inappropriate for women to appear in public wearing a tea gown. The dresses were intended to be worn indoors with family and close friends during a dinner party.

Although tea gowns were meant for midday wear, they could be worn into the evening. Women started wearing tea gowns in the evening for dinner or certain events at home with close friends and family by 1900. Tea gowns intended for day wear usually had high necks, while evening tea gowns had lower necks.

== See also ==
- Etiquette in Society, in Business, in Politics, and at Home
