= Angeliqa Devi =

Canadian-British actress

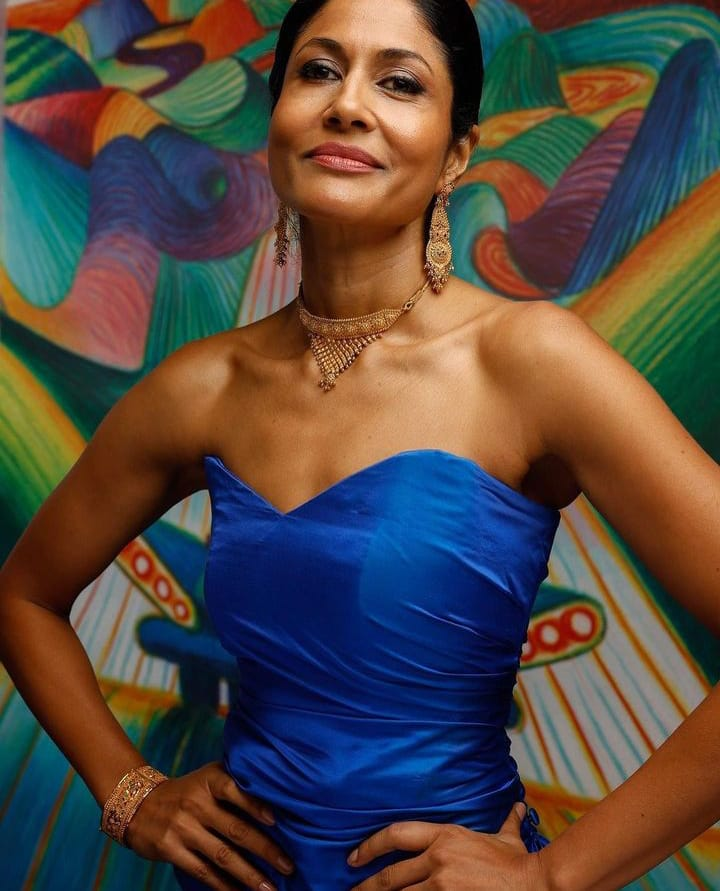
Angeliqa Devi at the 2023 Venice Film Festival

Angela Laboni Debnath (born 1 September 1977), known professionally as Angeliqa Devi, is a Canadian-British actress, best known for her roles in Liliana Cavani's The Order of Time (L'ordine del tempo) and Roland Emmerich's Roman Empire colossus Those About to Die featuring Sir Anthony Hopkins.

== Early life and career ==
Devi was born in Southport, Merseyside, England, to Bengali parents, the youngest of three daughters. At the age of two she moved with her family to Saskatchewan, Canada, following her father's appointment as anesthetist to the regional hospital. She intended to become an actor from an early age and left home at sixteen to attend the selective dramatic arts program at Canterbury High School in Ottawa. However, influenced by films including Steven Spielberg's Schindler's List and Roland Joffé's The Killing Fields, Devi developed an interest in human behaviour that first led her in other directions.

After obtaining a degree in modern history from the University of Toronto, Devi moved to London to work for human rights organisations where she met British playwright and novelist Anders Lustgarten with whom she collaborated on several projects. Devi then undertook an MA and PhD in genocide studies at University College London, which she was awarded in 2012. In 2006, Devi moved to Italy to teach at the American University of Rome.

== Acting career ==
Devi began her professional acting career in 2018 with a series of courses led by coach-practitioner Vincent Riotta, and has rapidly emerged as a compelling new presence on stage and screen. Her theatre debut came as both King Duncan and Lady Macduff in an all-female production of Macbeth, directed by Douglas Dean. Her first lead role was as Miranda in Lucy Kirkwood's satiric comedy NSFW, directed by Daniel Roy Connelly, in Rome in 2022.

On television, she appeared in the third season of Emmy Awards winning drama Succession directed by Mark Mylod, and as the ship doctor in Oliver Hirschbiegel's refugee thriller Unwanted.

Devi co-starred in Liliana Cavani's apocalyptic-themed film The Order of Time (L'ordine del tempo), inspired by quantum physicist Carlo Rovelli's novel of the same name. The film premiered out of competition at the 80th Venice International Film Festival, where Cavani received the Golden Lion for Lifetime Achievement.

Devi spent much of 2023 shooting at Cinecittà Studios with director Roland Emmerich on the epic Roman Empire drama, Those About to Die, featuring Sir Anthony Hopkins, in which she plays Caltonia, a powerful patrician and Circus Maximus team owner. She is in Jan Michelini's remake of the beloved 1970s pirate series Sandokan, with Can Yaman, Ed Westwick and John Hannah, which aired to great acclaim in 2025.

== Personal life ==
In 2012 Devi married opera director and documentary film maker Joseph Rochlitz, with whom she has two children. They separated in 2019. Devi is now in a relationship with Italian actor and economist Marco Mabritto. Devi performs in Italian as well as English.

== Select filmography ==
=== Cinema ===
- The Order of Time (L'ordine del tempo) directed by Liliana Cavani (2023)

=== Television ===
- Succession directed by Mark Mylod (2021)
- Devils directed by Nic Hurran and Jan Maria Michelini (2021)
- Everybody Loves Diamonds directed by Gianluca Maria Tavarelli (2023)
- Unwanted directed by Oliver Hirschbiegel (2023)
- Those About to Die directed by Roland Emmerich and Marco Kreuzpaintner (2024)
- Sandokan directed by Jan Maria Michelini and Nicola Abbatangelo (2025)
- Martin Scorsese Presents: The Saints (2026)

=== Short films ===
- A Fairy Tale directed by Angeliqa Devi (2021)
