= Pession =

Pession is a surname. Notable people with the surname include:

- Gabriella Pession (born 1977), American-born Italian actress
- Spencer Pession (born 1972), British former alpine skier
