= Libertini =

Libertini may refer to:

- Richard Libertini (1933-2016), an American stage, film and television actor
- Altri Libertini, first book by the Italian writer Pier Vittorio Tondelli
- Eriogonum libertini, a species of wild buckwheat known by the common name Dubakella Mountain buckwheat
- Libertini, the social status of freedmen in ancient Rome
