= Reality Is Not What It Seems =

Book by Carlo Rovelli

Reality Is Not What It Seems: The Journey to Quantum Gravity
- First edition (Italian)
- Author: Carlo Rovelli
- Original title: La realtà non è come ci appare. La struttura elementare delle cose
- Language: Italian
- Subject: Physics
- Genre: Non-fiction
- Publisher: Several
- Publication date: 2014
- Publication place: Italy
- English publication date: 2016
- Media type: Print, Digital, Audio CD
- Pages: 288 (English edition)
- ISBN: 9780735213920 (English hardcover edition)

Reality Is Not What It Seems: The Journey to Quantum Gravity (Italian: La realtà non è come ci appare. La struttura elementare delle cose) is an illustrated book by Italian physicist Carlo Rovelli. The book discusses quantum gravity. It was first published in Italian in 2014 (before the author's best-seller Seven Brief Lessons on Physics). It was published in English in 2016 by which time the English translation of Seven Brief Lessons had already been released.

== Structure ==
The book's opening chapters trace the history and evolution of quantum gravity. Starting with pre-socratic philosopher Democritus through to the ideas of Sir Isaac Newton and, eventually, Albert Einstein, Rovelli puts forward a theory that quantum gravity brings great unity to the universe. Rovelli then states that space and time, waves and particles, energy and matter are all the same. Rovelli then seeks to disprove the concepts of continuity and infinity.
