= Francesca Inaudi =

Italian actress

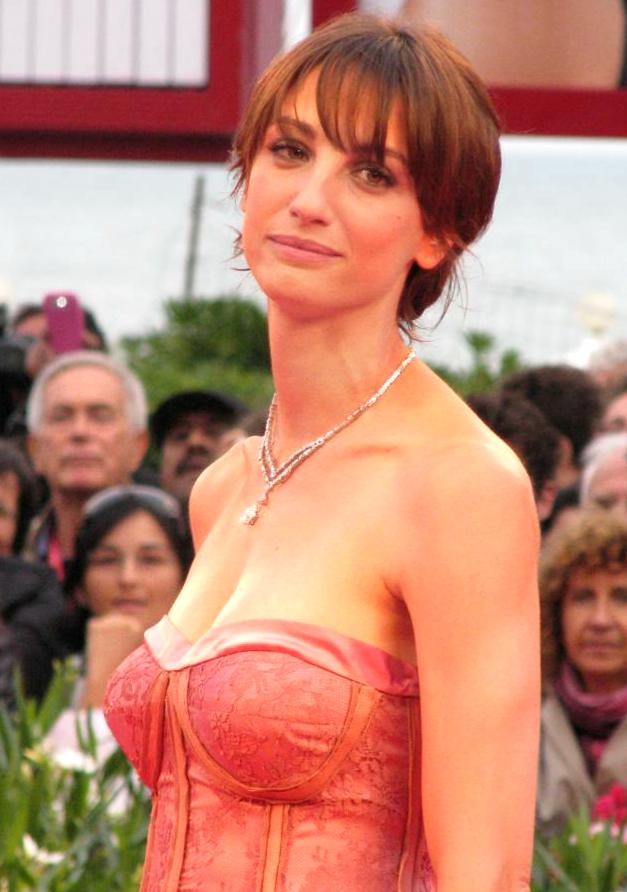
- Inaudi at the Venice Film Festival
- Born: 8 December 1977 (age 48); Siena, Italy
- Occupation: Actress

Francesca Inaudi (born 8 December 1977) is an Italian actress.

== Life and career ==
Born in Siena, Italy, at age eighteen Inaudi was selected by Giorgio Strehler to enroll in his acting courses at the Piccolo Teatro in Milan. After her graduation in 1999 and several years of work on stage, in 2004 Inaudi moved to Rome to pursue a film career, making her debut in Davide Ferrario's After Midnight. For her performance in this film she won a Grolla d'oro for best actress and earned a nomination to Nastro d'Argento in the same category. She later appeared in a large number of films and TV-series, receiving her second nomination to a Nastro d'Argento in 2007 for Paolo Virzì's Napoleon and Me.

== Filmography ==
=== Films ===
Year	Title	Role	Notes
2004	After Midnight	Amanda	
2005	L'uomo perfetto	Lucia	
2005	L'orizzonte degli eventi	Marta	
2005	Don't Tell	Anita	
2006	4-4-2 - Il gioco più bello del mondo	Francesca	Segment: "La donna del mister"
2006	Napoleon and Me	Mirella	
2006	Don't Make Any Plans for Tonight	Mariella	
2007	Viaggio in Italia: Una favola nera	Margherita	
2009	A Question of the Heart	Carla	
2009	Generation 1000 Euros	Valentina	
2009	Il richiamo	Lea	
2010	Marriage and Other Disasters	Beatrice	
2010	We Believed	Cristina Belgiojoso	
2011	Women vs. Men	Valeria Tanzi	
2011	Come trovare nel modo giusto l'uomo sbagliato	Sofia	
2013	See You Tomorrow	Flavia	
2013	Caro Paolo	Narrator	Short film
2014	The Move of the Penguin	Eva	
2014	L'amore non perdona	Maria Ida	
2014	Tre tocchi	Woman in hospital	Cameo appearance
2015	I calcianti	Barbara	
2016	Inferno	Museum guide	Cameo appearance
2016	Nausicaa	Daughter (voice)	Short film
2017	Ninna Nanna	Anita	
2017	All the Money in the World	Prostitute #2	Cameo appearance
2018	Finché giudice non si separi	Sylvie Montanelli	
2018	Stato di ebbrezza	Maria Rossi	
2018	That's Life	Ginevra	
2020	Different Century, Same Shit	Vittoria	Short film
2020	Adam	Eve	Short film
2023	The Order of Time	Giulia Dufour	

=== Television ===
Year	Title	Role	Notes
2006–2008	Distretto di Polizia	Inspector Irene Valli	Main role (season 6–7); guest (season 8)
2008–2012	Tutti pazzi per amore	Maya Marini	Main role
2010	Crimini	Melinda	Episode: "Mork e Mindy"
2012	A fari spenti nella notte	Antonia	Television film
2012	Mai per amore	Silvia	Episode: "Ragazze in web"
2014–2018	Una pallottola nel cuore	Maddalena Ferrante-Palmieri	Main role
2016	Come fai sbagli	Valeria	Main role
2020–2021	Cacciatore: The Hunter	Francesca Lagoglio	Main role (season 2–3)
2023	Monterossi	Isabella	Main role (season 2)
