= See You Tomorrow (2013 film) =

- Directed by: Andrea Zaccariello
- Written by: Paolo Rossi; Andrea Zaccariello
- Starring: Enrico Brignano; Burt Young; Francesca Inaudi; Ricky Tognazzi
- Cinematography: Giancarlo Lodi
- Music by: Giovanni Luisi
- Release date: 2013
- Running time: 103 minutes
- Language: Italian

See You Tomorrow (Italian: Ci vediamo domani) is a 2013 Italian comedy film written and directed by Andrea Zaccariello.

== Plot ==
Marcello Santilli is looking for the opportunity of his life. All attempts to be successful at work and get rich have turned out to be failures and he is now bankrupt. His wife, who is tired of taking care of him like a mother, and his daughter do not value him and above all do not have confidence in his ability to achieve something good in his life. But he is not discouraged: he thinks he has found the opportunity to finally succeed in affirming himself. He discovers Petrafrisca, a small remote town in Puglia, where the population is made up mainly of residents over ninety years old, where there is no funeral home. He imagines that, given the average age of the inhabitants, there will be no shortage of potential "customers". He then launches into this new business and opens the agency. Unfortunately for him, the inhabitants of the village, despite his age, are all in excellent health and have no intention of becoming his "customers".

== Cast ==
- Enrico Brignano as Marcello Santilli
- Burt Young as Mario Palagonia
- Francesca Inaudi as Flavia
- Ricky Tognazzi as Camicioli
- Giulia Salerno as Melania
- Giorgia Würth as Tina
- Corinne Jiga as Maria
- Luca Avagliano as Antonio Spataro
- Salvatore Cantalupo as Dr. Cuttaia
