= Massimiliano Chiamenti =

Italian poet and philologist

Massimiliano Chiamenti (Florence, 1967 - Bologna, 2011) was an Italian poet and philologist who lived in Bologna, and taught at the "Liceo delle Scienze Sociali Laura Bassi and the "Liceo Scientifico Leonardo Da vinci"".

== Career ==
From 1993, he published a number of collections of poems: Telescream (Cultura Duemila, 1993), User-friendly (David Seagull productions, 1994), x/7 (Dadamedia, 1995), p't (post) (Gazebo, 1997), Schedule (City Lights Italia, 1998), Maximilien (City Lights Italia, 1999), e (self-publishing, 2000), songs of being and not being here (self-publishing, 2001), 30 slide poems (self-publishing, 2002), rhythms 2003 (self-publishing, 2003), le teknostorie (Edizioni Segreti di Pulcinella, 2003, Zona, 2005), free love (Giraldi, 2007), adel & c. (Fermenti, 2008), paperback writer (Gattogrigio Editore, 2009) evvivalamorte (Le Càriti, 2011), and the collection of short stories Scherzi? (Giraldi, 2009).

His poems are written as free verse, and their main themes are same sex love, contemporary forms of neo-barbarism, and social marginality. In 1995, he received the poetry prize "Città di Corciano" from Edoardo Sanguineti. Some of his poems appeared in the journals "Alias", "Argo", "Forum Italicum", "Gradiva", "Idioteca", "Italian Poetry Review", "mumble:" and "Semicerchio".

He was active as a translator into Italian, translating poems by Lawrence Ferlinghetti, Ed Sanders, Anne Waldman and Philip Lamantia for City Lights.

As a philologist, he made contributions in the fields of Romance philology and Italian philology, mainly on texts by Dante Alighieri, Giacomo Leopardi and Pier Vittorio Tondelli. His many scholarly works include the book Dante Alighieri traduttore (Le Lettere, 1995), where Dante's Latin, French, and Provençal sources are investigated, and articles on Dante's character Jacopo Rusticucci ("Lingua Nostra", 1997), and the attribution to Dante of the trilingual poem "Ai faus ris" ("Dante Studies", 1998, "L'Alighieri", 2009).

He collaborated with the on-line Early Italian Vocabulary for the Accademia della Crusca. Chiamenti provided the critical editions of Pietro Alighieri's Comentum on The Divine Comedy (University of Arizona Press, 2002) and of the Chansons of the French trouvère Colin Muset (Carocci, 2005).

From 1990, he was active as a reader/performer of his poems, often accompanied by musicians.

== Death ==
He committed suicide in his house in Bologna at the age of 43.
