= L'uomo perfetto =

2005 film directed by Luca Lucini

- Theatrical release poster
- Directed by: Luca Lucini
- Written by: Lucia Moisio; Marco Ponti
- Produced by: Giovanni Stabilini; Marco Chimenz; Riccardo Tozzi
- Starring: Francesca Inaudi; Riccardo Scamarcio; Gabriella Pession; Giampaolo Morelli
- Cinematography: Manfredo Archinto
- Edited by: Fabrizio Rossetti
- Music by: David Rhodes
- Production company: Cattleya
- Distributed by: Warner Bros. Pictures
- Release date: 29 April 2005
- Running time: 92 minutes
- Country: Italy
- Language: Italian
- Box office: $1,881,273

L'uomo perfetto is a 2005 Italian romantic comedy film directed by Luca Lucini.

== Cast ==
- Francesca Inaudi as Lucia
- Riccardo Scamarcio as Antonio
- Gabriella Pession as Maria
- Giampaolo Morelli as Paolo
- Maria Chiara Augenti as Ginevra
- Donatella Bartoli as Sarta
- Giuseppe Battiston as Simone
- Giampiero Judica as Gustavo
