= Enrico Palandri =

Italian academic, writer and translator

Enrico Palandri (b. Venice 1956) is an Italian academic, writer and translator.

== Biography ==
Palandri graduated with a degree in Dramaturgy from the DAMS (The Disciplines of Art, Music and Theatre) school at the University of Bologna, where he studied with Gianni Celati, Giuliano Scabia and Umberto Eco.

During the Movement of 1977 in Italy, he curated a book on Radio Alice, Fatti Nostri with Carlo Rovelli, Maurizio Torrealta and Claudio Piersanti. Palandri’s first novel, Boccalone, is also set in Bologna during this same timeframe. The novel was published in 1979 through L’erba voglio press, run by Elvio Fachinelli, and then republished various times by Feltrinelli and Bompiani.

Palandri moved to London in 1980, where he worked as a language coach for the Royal Opera House and as a journalist (collaborating with RAI, the BBC and numerous newspapers).

In 1993, Palandri was given a Writing Residency post at the University College (London). As of 2003, he also taught a semester each year at Ca' Foscari University of Venice.. Presently, he is Professor Emeritus of Modern European Literature at the UCL.

Palandri has given talks on literature at universities in many European countries, North and South America, Middle East, Russia, China and Taiwan. Palandri’s novels, articles and essays have appeared in multiple languages and have received numerous prizes (Fenice Europa, Dessi’, Mastronardi, etc.). In 2003, he was conferred the title of “Commendatore” in the Order of the Star of Italian Solidarity for his cultural contributions by Italian President Carlo Azeglio Ciampi.

=== Publication history ===
After Boccalone, Palandri collaborated with Marco Bellocchio to write the script of the film Diavolo in Corpo (Devil in the Flesh) (1986). He then published six novels: Le pietre e il sale (English: Ages Apart) (1986), La via del ritorno (English: The Way Back) (1997), Le colpevoli ambiguita’ di Herbert Markus (1997), Angela prende il volo (2000), L’altra sera (English: The Other Evening) (2003), I fratelli minori (2010). In this cycle, reworked in a single narrative and published by Bompiani with the title "Le condizioni atmosferiche" (2020) such themes are explored as: “Historical events and social changes of great importance: from the student movement of 1977, to political terrorism, to the fall of the Berlin Wall to the radical changes imposed on European society due to the global phenomenon of migration.” (1)

Palandri has written short stories and other pieces published in newspapers and review journals, collected in large part in the volume Allegro fantastico (1993). Palandri has published two ballads in verse: La strega mia amica (English: Little Witch) (1986) and Orfeo a teatro (2007).

Palandri has also translated into Italian works by Eudora Welty, Robert McLiam Wilson and the brothers George and Weedon Grossmith.

=== Critical contributions ===
Pier (2005, on Pier Vittorio Tondelli) and Primo Levi (2011, on the Piedmont writer of the same name) are a monograph and an anthology respectively, with prefaces and commentaries which contextualize the corpus of work written concerning the two Italian authors. The volumes La deriva romantica (2002) and Flow (2011) are, instead, books with a very strong theoretical focus. They discuss, in large part, questions relative to style, to the process of textual generation and the generation of metaphors, which are attributed to an independent vitality, not rhetoric but dynamically linked to content, and which qualifies literature. Flow begins with this phrase: “Poems and novels are the metaphors by which reality is brought into focus”. A single conversational flow is articulated through literary surfaces, in expression, and in profundity, in an atemporal dimension which creates cracks in those surfaces, which gives rise to the invention that the work is the space itself. In this volume, observations made in 16 appunti sulle metafore are added onto theoretical articulation, observations published and elaborated on various times in different contributing contexts before being collected in La deriva romantica. Lectures on diverse subjects given by Palandri at various universities have been published and are available online. " Verso L'infinito" is a monograph on Giacomo Leopardi's poem. " Sette Finestre " is a collection of seven lectures on: Narrative, Interpretation, Time in Literature, the relationship between Critical and Fictional roles, Love for/through and by fictional characters, the beauty of strangeness, Seeking the source.

=== Works ===
- Boccalone: storia vera piena di bugie, Milan: L’erba voglio, 1979; n. ed. Milan: Feltrinelli, 1988; n. ed. Milan: Bompiani, 1997; ivi, 2011. German edition in 2025.
- Le pietre e il sale, Milan: Garzanti, 1986. Translated into English and Catalan.
- A translation of Eudora Welty, Come mi sono scoperta scrittore, Milan: Leonardo, 1989
- La via del ritorno, Milan: Bompiani, 1990; n. ed. Milan: Feltrinelli, 2001. Translated into German, English and French. Finalist for the “France Culture” prize for the year’s best European novel.
- A translation of George and Weedon Grossmith, Diario di nessuno, Milan: Marcos y Marcos, 1991.
- Allegro fantastico, Milan: Bompiani, 1993. Finalist for the Pisa Prize.
- Le colpevoli ambiguita’ di Herbert Markus, Milan: Bompiani, 1997. Finalist for the Stresa Prize.
- Angela prende il volo, Milan: Feltrinelli, 2000, finalist for the Fenice Europa Prize, Mastronardi Prize, and Dessi’ Prize.
- La deriva romantica: ipotesi sulla letteratura e sulla scrittura, Novara: Interlinea, 2002.
- L’altra sera, Milan: Feltrinelli, 2003. Finalist for the Bancarella Sport Prize. Translated into English, 2012.
- Italia Fantastica, special issue of “Panta”, edited by Mario Fortunato and Enrico Palandri, Milan: Bompiani, 2004.
- Pier. Tondelli e la generazione, Rome-Bari: Laterza, 2005.
- Orfeo a teatro: canzone a tre voci per Orfeo, Euridice e un tecnico delle luci, Venice: Fondazione Querini Stampalia, 2007.
- I fratelli minori, Milan: Bompiani, 2010. Translated into English, 2012.
- Primo Levi, Florence: Le Monnier, 2011.
- Flow, Siena: Barbera, 2011.
- "L'inventore di se stesso", Milan, Bompiani 2017
- "Verso l'infinito", Mlan, Bompiani 2017
- "Le condizioni atmosferiche" Milan, Bompiani 2020
- "Sette finestre" (2023)

=== Notes ===
(1) Minardi and Francioso, 2011.
