= Francesca Vidotto =

Female Italian theoretical physicist

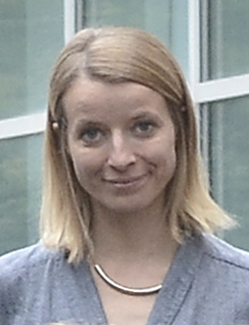
- Vidotto in 2017
- Born: November 22, 1980 (age 45); Treviso, Italy
- Education: University of Padova
- Known for: Spinfoam Cosmology; Planck stars
- Scientific career
- Fields: Loop Quantum Gravity

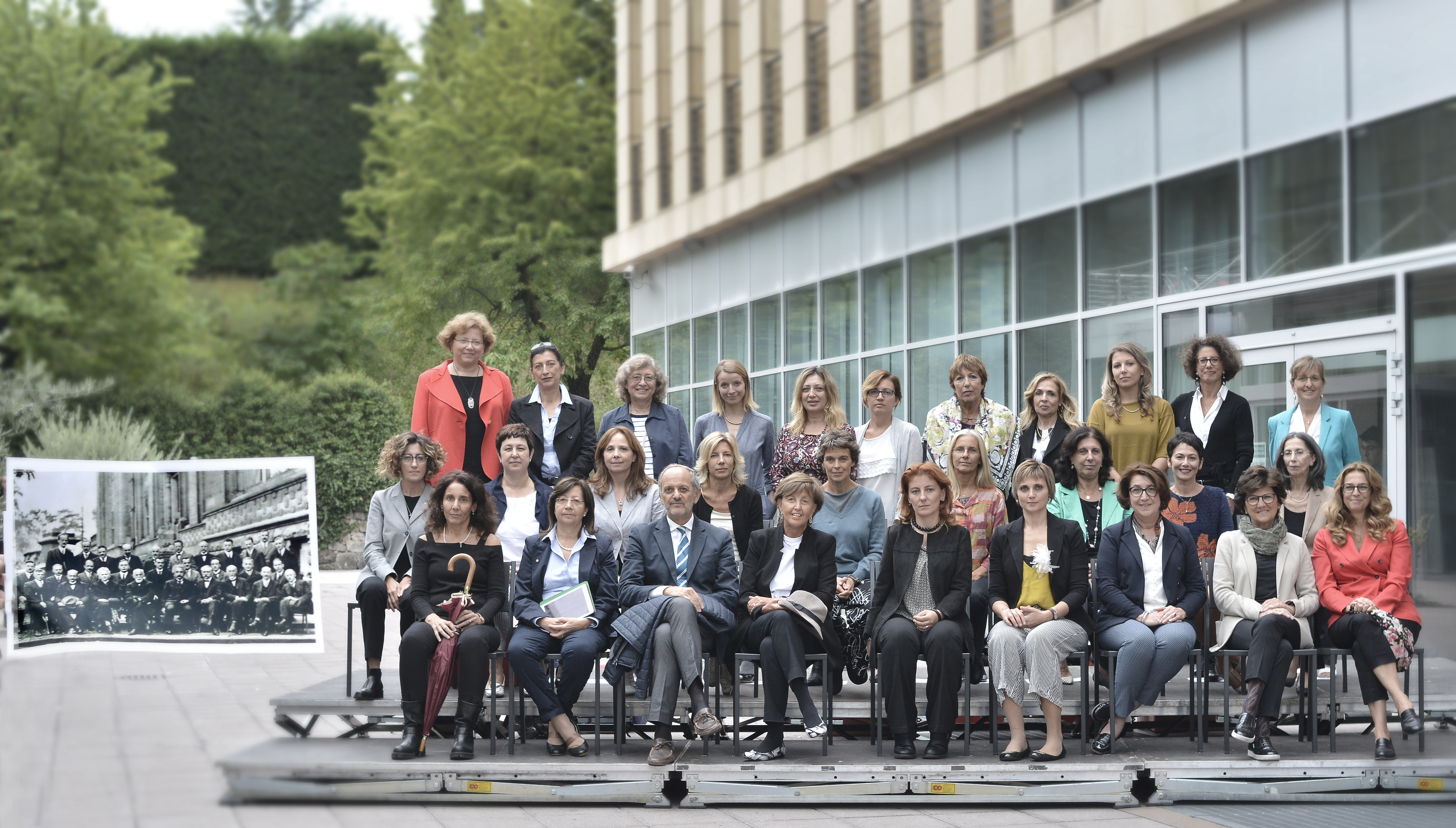
Francesca Vidotto pictured in a 2017 recreation of 1927 Solvay Conference. Third row, fourth from the left.

Francesca Vidotto (born November 22, 1980) is an Italian theoretical physicist.

== Biography ==
She earned her UG/MA in theoretical physics at the University of Padova and the PhD as double-degree at the University of Pavia and the Aix-Marseille Université. Afterwards, she was a postdoc researcher at the universities of Grenoble, Nijmegen and Bilbao. From 2019 to 2025, she was Assistant Professor of Physics & Astronomy and Philosophy at the University of Western Ontario, where she hold a Canada Research Chair in Foundations of Physics. She was also a core member and associate director of Western's Rotman Institute of Philosophy.

Her research explores the quantum aspects of the gravitational field, in the framework of Loop Quantum Gravity. Her work covers topics from the cosmological and astrophysical applications of quantum gravity to the reflections on the nature of space-time and the foundations of quantum mechanics. She is best known for two research directions: Spin foam Cosmology, and Planck stars, with special emphasis on white holes and black hole remnants. Her main research interests have been cosmology, the quantum effect of black holes, and the foundations of quantum mechanics.

Vidotto won the first prize (shared with Amanda Gefter) in the 2023 FQXi contest "How could science be different?" for her essay "How Could Science Be Different? Ask a feminist!". She is an advocate for equity, inclusion and diversity in the physics field. She also believes philosophy and physics go hand in hand.

== Publications ==
=== Scientific book ===
- Covariant Loop Quantum Gravity: An elementary introduction (with Carlo Rovelli), Cambridge University Press, 2015.

=== Main scientific papers ===
- Primordial Fluctuations from Quantum Gravity (with Francesco Gozzini), 2019.
- Quantum insights on Primordial Black Holes as Dark Matter, 2018.
- Planck stars (with Carlo Rovelli), 2014.
- Maximal acceleration in covariant loop gravity and singularity resolution (with Carlo Rovelli), 2013.
- Towards spinfoam cosmology (with Eugenio Bianchi and Carlo Rovelli), 2010.
