= Davide Tucci =

Maltese actor and model (born 1987)

- Born: Isola del Liri, Lazio, Italy
- Occupations: Actor, model
- Years active: 2009–present

Davide Tucci is a Maltese actor and model. He has roles in the 2021 TV series Barbarians, the 2023 film Napoleon, and the 2024 TV series Those About to Die.

== Early life and education ==
Davide Tucci was born on in Isola del Liri. Later, his family moved to the Maltese Islands, where he attended St. Aloysius College.

== Career ==
Tucci started out in musical theatre with Spring Awakening and later started a career in modelling which earned him two consecutive awards at the Malta Fashion Awards in 2010 and 2011.

He gained popularity in Malta due to his TV roles as Clyde Montaldo in Katrina, and that of Alex Mamo on Ic-Caqqufa, both television series on Maltese National Television. He later on starred as Brimbu on the Maltese television thriller series Division 7 (ongoing series) on Malta's ONE TV. Davide Tucci also plays John Camilleri in Limestone Cowboy, one of the first indigenous feature films coming out of the Maltese Islands; Dangerous Arrangement, directed by Mario Philip Azzopardi and produced by eOne Canada; and 13 Hours: The Secret Soldiers of Benghazi. Since 2020 he worked on a number of Maltese and international film & TV productions in Europe.

Tucci is also a stage actor who has performed in such plays as Jiena Nhobb, Inti Thobb, Marti Martek, Martek Marti at the National Theatre of Malta; Faith, Hope u Charity performed at Fort St. Elmo as part of the Malta Arts Festival; William Shakespeare's A Midsummer Night's Dream, performed at the presidential palace's gardens.; and also worked in the acclaimed Maltese cabaret musical Balzunetta Towers, a show which sold out soon after its premiere, part of the 2017 Malta International Arts Festival programme, created by some of the most prominent Maltese artists such as Alfred Sant (dialogue), Dominic Galea (music) and Albert Marshall (lyrics). In 2020, he also starred in the iconic role of Jack Worthing in Oscar Wilde's The Importance Of Being Earnest, at the National Theatre of Malta - to date, this has been his last role on stage.

Among many other TV, print, and radio interviews, Tucci has been featured in 2016 by Lino Mallia on Platea; he is the youngest actor to date to be interviewed on the program.

== Recognition and awards ==
Tucci woon the Male Photo-Model Award 2010 and 2011 in Malta Fashion Week. at the Malta Fashion Awards.

== Filmography ==
Year	Title	Role	Notes
2016	13 Hours	Defense Attache	
2017	Limestone Cowboy	John Camilleri	
2018	L-Gharusa	Diego	
2019	Il-Miraklu Ta Hal-Saflieni	Father Randolph	
2020	God's Soldiers	Knight Hospitaller, Raymonde	
2021	Barbarians	Septimus	
2023	Napoleon	Lazare Hoche	
2024	Those About to Die	Manilius	
