= Those About to Die =

2024 television series

- Genre: Epic historical drama
- Based on: Those About to Die by Daniel P. Mannix
- Written by: Robert Rodat
- Directed by: Roland Emmerich; Marco Kreuzpaintner
- Starring: Anthony Hopkins; Iwan Rheon; Sara Martins; Tom Hughes; Jojo Macari; Moe Hashim; Jóhannes Haukur Jóhannesson; Rupert Penry-Jones; Gabriella Pession; Dimitri Leonidas; Emilio Sakraya; David Wurawa; Pepe Barroso; Gonçalo Almeida; Eneko Sagardoy; Lara Wolf; Romana Maggiora Vergano; Angeliqa Devi
- Theme music composer: Woodkid
- Composer: Andrea Farri
- Countries of origin: United States; Germany; Italy
- Original languages: English; Italian; German; Arabic
- No. of episodes: 10

Production
- Executive producers: Roland Emmerich; Robert Rodat; Gianni Nunnari; Harald Kloser; Marco Kreuzpaintner; Oliver Berben; Herbert G. Kloiber; Martin Moszkowicz; Jonas Bauer; Stuart Ford; Lourdes Diaz; Charles Holland
- Cinematography: Vittorio Omodei Zorini; Daniel Gottschalk
- Production companies: AGC Studios; Centropolis Entertainment; Hollywood Gang Productions; Street Entertainment
- Budget: $140 million

Original release
- Network: Peacock (United States); Amazon Prime Video (International)
- Release: July 18, 2024

Those About to Die is an epic historical drama television series developed by Robert Rodat and directed by Roland Emmerich and Marco Kreuzpaintner based on Daniel P. Mannix book. It premiered on July 18, 2024, on Peacock and internationally on Amazon Prime Video the next day. The series title references the Latin gladiatorial greeting made to the Emperor at the games "Ave Caesar, morituri te salutant (Hail Caesar, those about to die salute you)".

== Plot ==
In 79 AD, Rome is under the leadership of the elderly Emperor Vespasian, along with his sons, Titus and Domitianus. They are working on building the Colosseum to give to the people of Rome. Elsewhere in the city, the criminal Tenax seeks to raise himself to higher status by building a team for the races at the Circus Maximus, aided by the famed racer Scorpus. A woman, Cala, goes to Rome to free her daughters, Aura and Jula, from slavery and her son, Kwame, from certain death as a gladiator. After Vespasian dies and Titus is appointed his successor, Domitianus recruits Tenax to help scheme his way to power.

== Cast ==
=== Main ===
- Iwan Rheon as Tenax, the owner of Rome's largest betting tavern.
- Anthony Hopkins as Vespasianus, Emperor of Rome. Once a renowned military leader, now near the end of his life.
- Sara Martins as Cala, a black Numidian trader who follows her children - Kwame, Aura, and Jula - to Rome.
- Tom Hughes as Titus Flavius Vespasianus, the emperor's oldest son and a successful general.
- Jojo Macari as Titus Flavius Domitianus, the emperor's youngest son. The Games Master, or Aedile Ludi, who organizes Rome's gladiatorial matches and chariot races.
- Moe Hashim as Kwame, a hunter who becomes a gladiator in Rome.
- Jóhannes Haukur Jóhannesson as Viggo, a Norse warrior turned gladiator.
- Rupert Penry-Jones as Marsus Servillius, a Roman consul and influential member of the Blue Faction.
- Gabriella Pession as Antonia Servillia, Marsus's wife, a member of the Blue Faction.
- Dimitri Leonidas as Scorpus, the most successful and beloved charioteer in Rome, who races for the Blue Faction.
- Emilio Sakraya as Xenon, a charioteer for the White Faction and Scorpus' main rival.
- David Wurawa as Gavros, an experienced horse trainer and former charioteer.
- Pepe Barroso as Fonsoa Corsi, a Hispanic horse breeder; Elia and Andria's brother.
- Gonçalo Almeida as Elia Corsi, a Hispanic horse breeder; Fonsoa and Andria's younger brother.
- Eneko Sagardoy as Andria Corsi, a Hispanic horse breeder; Elia and Fonsoa's older brother, who dreams of becoming a charioteer.
- Lara Wolf as Berenice, Titus' mistress, the Judaean Queen.
- Romana Maggiora Vergano as Salena, an impoverished member of the Blue Faction.
- Angeliqa Devi as Caltonia, the head of the Blue Faction.

=== Supporting ===
- Kyshan Wilson and Alicia Edogamhe as Aura and Jula, Cala's daughters, who are enslaved and brought to Rome.
- Alessandro Bedetti as Hermes, Domitian's Greek slave and lover.
- Martyn Ford as Flamma, a gigantic and fearsome gladiator.
- Bruno Bilotta as Atticus, trainer of the gladiators at Circus Maximus.
- Felix Lampert as Carpo, trainer of the wild animals at Circus Maximus.
- Niccolò Senni as Lentullus, the chariot builder at Circus Maximus.
- Jarreth J. Merz and Christian Hillborg as Dacia and Noro, Tenax's henchmen.
- Vincent Riotta, Michael Bundred and Marco Gambino as Leto, Torel and Sepulcius, Roman senators who head the White, Red and Green Factions respectively.
- Adrian Bouchet as Porto, the Praetorian Prefect under Titus.
- Davide Tucci as Manilius, a Praetorian Guard with a love of gambling.
- Clélia Zanini as Marcia, Titus' cousin whom he takes as wife and empress.
- Alice Lamanna as Cornelia, Antonia and Marsus' daughter who serves as a Vestal Virgin.
- Victor von Schirach as Passus, Domitian's extravagant games master.
- Meledeen Yacoubi and Francis Thurston-Crees as Sapo and Tarlo, sports enthusiasts who are present for every race and fight.
- Daniel Stisen as Ursus, a mysterious figure from Tenax's past.
- Michael Maggi and Federico Ielapi as Rufus and Otho, Salena's husband and son.
- Thomas Hunt as Lucius, head of a group of criminals who work for Domitian.
- Gabrielle Scharnitzky as Drusilla, the housekeeper who oversees the slaves in the house of Consul Marsus.
- Renata Palminiello as Claudia, the housekeeper for Tenax.
- Giselda Volodi as Giselda, personal attendant and confidante of Queen Berenice.
- Leone Girlanda, Theodore Max Gravina and Mia McGovern Zaini as Felix, Woola and Nica, orphaned children who work for Tenax.

== Episodes ==
No. overall	No. in season	Title	Directed by	Written by	Original release date
1	1	"Rise or Die"	Roland Emmerich	Robert Rodat	July 18, 2024
In 79 AD, Emperor Vespasian constructs the Coloseum, and leads Rome along with his two sons, Titus, a military leader, and Domitian. A crime lord, Tenax, runs a gambling business, and fixes races to win shares of one of the racing factions in the Circus Maximus. In Nubia, a drunk Roman soldier tries to rape the daughter of Cala, and when she kills him, the other Romans take her daughters, Aura and Jula, to be sold as slaves. Carla's son, Kwame, is on a hunt, but tries to rescue them, only to be captured himself and sold as a gladiator. Three brothers, Gavros, Fonsola, and Elia, arrive in Rome from Hispania with the hope of selling and training horses used in the Circus Maximus. Scorpus wins his race, but discovers that the chariot he was originally supposed to use had been sabotaged and would have crashed.
2	2	"Trust None"	Roland Emmerich	Robert Rodat	July 18, 2024
Tenax determines that Scorpus's chariot was sabotaged by Domitian to enable him to pay off his gambling debts. Scorpus rides the Hispanic horses brought by Gavros, Fonsola, and Elia and is impressed by their speed. Tenax sells the faction shares he gained while betting and gets enough money to create his own faction, along with a deal with Domitian to give him half of the team's ownership in return of becoming his client. Vespasian announces that Titus will be his successor, which angers Domitian. The Hispanic horses are poisoned, and Tenax searches for the perpetrator. Cala arrives in Rome but is unable to purchase the freedom of her daughters, as Jula is bought by Antonia, wife of the consul Marsus, and in order to spy on her, Tenax buys Aura. He makes a deal with Cala that she will act as their go-between, in return for buying her daughter's freedom later.
3	3	"Death's Door"	Roland Emmerich	Robert Rodat	July 18, 2024
Domitian is unhappy with his position as aedile of public games (ludi) because he aspires to be the Roman emperor. To regain the money he lost, he takes gold bars from the Imperial Treasury and bets them on every faction losing. Scorpus is stabbed in the streets, therefore Xenon is chosen as his replacement in the Blue faction. However, this was a fake assassination arranged by Tenax, Scorpus turns up alive, racing for the new Gold faction and wins the race. Domitian has his men replace the gold he stole from the treasure, while people riot on the streets due to the fifth faction. Cala finds out that Antonia had a daughter who was given away to become a Vestal Virgin, and tries to ask her for help in freeing his children. Vespasian passes away, in A.D. 79.
4	4	"Fool's Bet"	Marco Kreuzpaintner	Charles Holland	July 18, 2024
After being declared emperor, Titus urges the Roman Senate to deify his father Vespasian like Julius Caesar, Augustus, and Claudius. This will turn his father into a revered Roman god. To appease the mob, the Gold Faction is disbanded, and suspecting Domitian behind the riots and the grain delivery delays, Titus places him under house arrest. Domitian's male lover (Note: As depicted in the series. Probably, not historical.) Hermes tells him of a plot against Berenice by disgruntled jewish workers. They are arrested and Domitian plans a circus play where the captured white lion devours them, while a horrified Berenice watches. An angry Titus almost kills his brother, who explains he did this for him, to give the people an outlet for their hatred of a foreign queen. Berenice cautions the divorced Titus against marrying her on account of xenophobia in Roman society and suggests he marry his niece. After closing time, Tenax is assaulted by the mysterious scarred man, revealed to be Ursus, a childhood friend he thought he left behind to die in a fire, Ursus beats him and promises to ruin him financially before disappearing.
5	5	"Betrayal"	Marco Kreuzpaintner	Alex Carmedelle	July 18, 2024
The new emperor Titus has married his cousin Marcia. (Note: As depicted in the series. Probably, not historical since Titus had divorced Marcia more than 10 years before ascending to the throne in 79.) Scorpus loses to Xenon in the race. Ursus sends a letter, demanding all of a day's winning to be delivered to him, when Tenax sends one of the street kids in his employ to spy on him, the kid ends up killed and hanged in his tavern as a warning. Rufus is hired by Berenice to gain employ at Tenax and spy on him. Antonia has her eye on becoming empress and goads her husband Marsus to plot against Titus. Kwame is sent by order of Domitian to fight Flamma in the arena, Tenax manages to get Cala in to see him. The episode concludes with the eruption of Mount Vesuvius in 79 AD. The resulting earthquake helps Kwame survive Flamma's assault, but he is defeated, however to spite Domitian, Titus orders him spared.
6	6	"Blood Relation"	Marco Kreuzpaintner	Eva Gonzalez Szigriszt	July 18, 2024
Titus provides aid to the refugees from Pompei. Antonia extinguishes the Vestal flame, and she and Marsus use the chaos to plot against the Emperor. Through Jula, Tenax is informed and he brings the matter to Domitian. He alerts Titus and they both spy on the secret gathering of the Senate. Domitian arrests two Senators and the Consul Marsus for plotting against the Emperor. Titus orders the Inaugural games of the Colosseum in 80, doubles the grain given to the plebs, and as thanks to Domitian, restores the Gold faction. Kwame is locked up and denied food, to fight Flamma in a revenge bout, but Viggo smuggles in food for him. Tenax requests to be named master of the games, and as a test Domitian asks him to organize the execution of the traitors. Tenax arranges for Scorpus to get arrested for betting on himself, then bails him out in return for rejoining the Golds. By cheating with lighter chariots, Scorpus wins the race, but Domitian demands his part of the winnings while Tenax has to deliver them to Ursus. Antonia appeals to her daughter, now named chief Vestal Virgin, to pardon her father, but she refuses, angry at her parents having sacrificed her childhood and freedom for future favors. She also rebuffs Cala's request, knowing that she works with Tenax. The street kids report Ursus' arrival to pick up the winnings, but Tenax is betrayed by his own man. After beating him, Ursus breaks his leg and leaves him to burn alive, the same way he got his scars. He also tells Tenax - known as a kid as Quintus - that the abusive man who was their owner, and whom they killed as kids, was actually Quintus's father and a patrician.
7	7	"Death's Bed"	Marco Kreuzpaintner	Jill Robi	July 18, 2024
Tenax is rescued from the fire by the kids, and laid up in bed with a broken leg. Marsus asks Servilia to publicly scorn him, to preserve her status. She plants a scorpion in Scorpus's bed, causing him to miss a race. Cala puts Andria in the race, and the Golds still win, annoying Scorpus. Dacia, Tenax's henchman discovers that Ursus has stolen Tenax's profits, to the fury of Domitian. While Tenax is inacapacitated, Cala continues to run the gambling business at a profit. With Aura's help, Dacia tracks down Ursus but is killed. Cala poisons Flamma before his bout with Kwame, allowing Kwame to kill him. Ursus assaults Cala but is killed by a recovered Tenax.
8	8	"All or Nothing"	Marco Kreuzpaintner	Marissa Lestrade	July 18, 2024
During the next race, a jealous Scorpus, angry at being upstaged, forces Andria's coach to crash, creating a pile-up that kills him. Xanon is injured in the crash, and Scorpus later kills him when he tries to blackmail him to resign. Elia blames Scorpus, leaves the Gold faction, and joins the Blues as a new driver, while Fonsoa is promoted to race instead of Andria. Kwame refuses to eat or participate in the opening games of the new amphitheatre, but reluctantly cooperates when Domitian threatens Viggo. Leto tells Titus that he has evidence Domitian ordered the delay to the grain ships and has a witness coming to Rome, asking for a share in the new Amphitheatrum in return. Titus informs Domitian but is unconvinced of his guilt. Domitian believes it will be impossible to silence the witness and approaches Tenax with a plan to kill Titus instead, to save themselves. Domitian discovers Hermes with another man and has Hermes arrested and his lover executed. Aura saves her lover from her pimp and runs away with her, and learns that women can become gladiator too. Tenax meets with Manilius of the Praetorians, who agrees to support Domitian and Tenax in exchange for 10 million sestercii to be delivered within two days.
9	9	"The Die Is Cast"	Roland Emmerich	Robert Rodat	July 18, 2024
To raise the money to pay Manilius, Tenax attempts to fix a race so that Scorpus wins. Elia forces Scorpus into a crash, killing him, but, to Elia's horror, Fonsoa is also killed in the resulting pileup. The bet is lost, but Tenax manages to find the lost Gold winnings, enough to pay off Manilius. He has Cala write twin confessions for him and Manilius to give each of them leverage over the other and Domitian. Hermes attempts to warn Titus, but Domitian has the Praetorians cut off his tongue. Rufus overhears the plot and tips off Berenice, who goes to Antonia. Together they use Jula to blackmail Cala into giving up Tenax's copy of the confession. Kwame participates in the opening ceremony of the Colosseum but is horrified to see that Aura has now joined the ranks of the gladiators. As part of the ceremony, Hermes, Marsus, and the other imprisoned senators are fed to crocodiles. Antonia arrives in time to see Marsus killed. A favourable wind brings the witness against Domitian to Ostia early. Tenax and Domitian intend to move up the plan to kill Titus, but Porto places a heavier guard around the emperor in preparation for an immediate departure to Ostia. Berenice attempts to deliver the confession to Titus in the Colosseum, but is ambushed and killed by Jewish fanatics in the galleries.
10	10	"Let the Games Begin"	Roland Emmerich	Robert Rodat	July 18, 2024
Kwame and Viggo are pitted against each other in the Colosseum, with Jula's and Viggo's son's life being threatened to make them fight to the death. Manilius hears news of the witness arriving early, and orders his praetorians to find and kill Tenax to tie up loose ends. Kwame manages to wound Viggo and pleads for his life, but contrary to the people's wishes, Titus sentences him to die, seeing their fight symbolic to his relationship with his brother. Kwame is granted the wooden sword, but gives it to Jula so she can be free. Jula tells Elia that she is pregnant with his child. Tenax manages to kill Manilius, and bribes his praetorians with the money. To hurt Kwame, Domitianus orders Viggo's son killed In the commotion, the giant white lion gets loose and attacks both the gladiators, actors and spectators, until Kwame kills it. After discovering the death of Berenice, Titus leaves with Domitianus to Ostia. After receiving proof that his brother withheld the grain shipments to undermine him, he sentences him to be thrown off the Tarpeian cliffs, publicly. However, Tenax arrives with the bribed troops, who kill Porto. However, none of the soldiers dare to raise a hand against Titus, so Tenax smothers him to death while Domitianus mocks his dying brother. After delivering proof of Titus's death (pretending it was due to natural causes), the Senate begrudgingly acknowledge the 30-year-old Domitian as the new emperor, who names Tenax aedile ludi. Tenax confronts Cala, telling her she has to die for betraying him, but she remains unshaken, saying she never lied to him - she will do anything for her children, but she will serve him faithfully otherwise. Tenax forgives her. In the end, while Domitianus takes the crown, Tenax sets out for Syracuse, Sicily to find out who is his father and to claim his lands.

== Production ==
It was announced in July 2022 that Peacock had issued a series order for the project, written by Robert Rodat and directed by Roland Emmerich. The series has a budget of $140 million. Emmerich said he was convinced to make his television debut after watching Game of Thrones, and decided to do something catering to his fascination with the Roman Empire.

In January 2023, Anthony Hopkins was cast. Dimitri Leonidas, Gabriella Pession, Lorenzo Richelmy and Tom Hughes were cast in February, with Marco Kreuzpaintner joining Emmerich as a director. Production began at Cinecittà in Rome in March with additional casting announced including Iwan Rheon, who was cast to replace Richelmy. Emmerich noted that compared to filmmaking doing television meant working at a faster pace with less repeated takes, and took advantage of the "Volume" on-set virtual production, which was used for 108 days of filming, and featured digital scenery done by effects companies DNEG and Dimension Studio. Faber Courtial contributed a virtual recreation of Ancient Rome for the wide shots, and ReDefine made computer-generated animals.

== Reception ==
The series holds a 47% approval rating on review aggregator Rotten Tomatoes. The website's critics consensus reads, "Those About to Die doles out enough bread and circuses to state viewers' bloodlust, but its lack of compelling characters and narrative cohesion doesn't quite earn a salute." On Metacritic, the series holds a weighted average score of 49 out of 100, based on 23 critics, indicating "mixed or average" reviews.
