= Global Peace Dividend =

International proposal to reduce military spending

The Global Peace Dividend initiative is a proposal for international negotiations to reduce military expenditure by 2% per year in all countries and use the funds liberated in the fight against planetary emergencies. The proposal is signed by more than fifty Nobel Prize laureates, the presidents of several of the most important Academies of Sciences, a number of leading intellectuals, political and NGO leaders, and some celebrities. This initiative is organized by physicists Carlo Rovelli and Matteo Smerlak, who have co-authored opinion pieces calling for attention to the proposal.

There is currently an active petition to gather public support on the platform Change.org.
