= Marriage and Other Disasters =

- Directed by: Nina Di Majo
- Written by: Nina Di Majo; Francesco Bruni; Giovanni Bognetti; Domenico Costanzo
- Starring: Margherita Buy; Fabio Volo; Luciana Littizzetto; Francesca Inaudi
- Cinematography: Cesare Accetta
- Edited by: Giogiò Franchini
- Music by: Carlo Crivelli; Davide Mastropaolo
- Release date: 23 April 2010
- Running time: 102 minutes
- Country: Italy
- Language: Italian

Marriage and Other Disasters (Italian: Matrimoni e altri disastri, also known as Weddings and Other Disasters) is a 2010 Italian comedy film written and directed by Nina Di Majo.

It was nominated for two Silver Ribbons, for best actress (Margherita Buy) and best supporting actress (Luciana Littizzetto).

== Cast ==
- Margherita Buy as Nanà
- Fabio Volo as Alessandro
- Francesca Inaudi as Bea
- Luciana Littizzetto as Benedetta
- Marisa Berenson as Lucrezia
- Mohammad Bakri as Bauer
- Massimo De Francovich as Neri

== See also ==
- List of Italian films of 2010
