= Colin Muset =

13th-century French trouvère

Colin Muset (fl. c. 1210–50 or 1230–70) was an Old French trouvère and a native of Lorraine. He made his living in the Champagne by travelling from castle to castle singing songs of his own composition and playing the vielle. These are not confined to the praise of courtly love that formed the usual topic of the trouvères, but contain many details of a jongleur's life. His complete works are eighteen: nine attributed in chansonniers, three self-referencing, and six whose attributions are based on modern scholarship (one of which is held to be mis-attributed in the manuscripts). Twenty one poems credited to him were edited and published by Joseph Bédier in 1912 (Paris). Two further editions appeared in 2005: one by Callahan and Rosenberg with translations into modern French, and, with translations into Italian, an edition by Massimiliano Chiamenti, which reduced his authentic corpus to sixteen poems. Oxford Music online (effectively New Grove 2001), lists 12 songs. Nine of his poems have surviving music. Seven are chansons jongleuresques, that is, songs describing the life of a jongleur. His three serventois condemn the avarice of the nobility, but his moralising is balanced by self-deprecating humour. He also wrote two descorts, one lai, and one cynical tenson with Jacques d'Amiens.

One of his patrons was Agnès de Bar, duchess of Lorraine.

The nickname "Muset" may derive from his inspiration ("muse") or from his habit of muser (wandering about, wasting time).

== Bibliography ==
- Joseph Bédier, Les chansons de Colin Muset. 2nd edition, Classiques français du Moyen Age (Paris: H. Champion, 1938).
- Christopher J. Callahan, and Samuel N. Rosenberg, Les chansons de Colin Muset: textes et mélodies (Paris: Champion, 2005).
