= The Order of Time (film) =

2023 film by Liliana Cavani

- Theatrical release poster
- Italian: L'ordine del tempo
- Directed by: Liliana Cavani
- Screenplay by: Liliana Cavani; Paolo Costella
- Based on: L'ordine del tempo by Carlo Rovelli
- Produced by: Fabrizio Donvito; Benedetto Habib; Marco Cohen; Daniele Campos Pavoncelli
- Starring: Alessandro Gassmann; Claudia Gerini; Edoardo Leo; Kseniya Rappoport; Richard Sammel; Valentina Cervi; Fabrizio Rongione; Francesca Inaudi; Angeliqa Devi; Ángela Molina
- Cinematography: Enrico Lucidi
- Edited by: Massimo Quaglia
- Music by: Vincent Cahay
- Production companies: Indiana Production; Gapbusters; Vision Distribution
- Distributed by: Vision Distribution
- Release dates: 30 August 2023 (Venice); 31 August 2023 (Italy)
- Running time: 113 minutes
- Countries: Italy; Belgium
- Languages: Italian; Spanish; English
- Box office: $498,118

The Order of Time (Italian: L'ordine del tempo) is a 2023 Belgian-Italian drama film directed by Liliana Cavani, from a screenplay written by Cavani and Paolo Costella in collaboration with physicist Carlo Rovelli. The film is freely inspired by Rovelli's 2017 essay of the same name. It stars an ensemble cast, which includes Alessandro Gassmann, Claudia Gerini, Edoardo Leo, Kseniya Rappoport, Richard Sammel, Valentina Cervi, Fabrizio Rongione, Francesca Inaudi, Angeliqa Devi and Ángela Molina.

The film premiered out of competition at the 80th Venice International Film Festival, where Cavani was presented with the Golden Lion for Lifetime Achievement.

== Plot ==
In a villa by the sea, a group of old friends gather to celebrate Elsa's 50th birthday. They soon discover that the world might be ending within the space of a few hours. From that moment on, the time separating them from the possible end of their lives seems to flow differently, both speedily and never-endingly.

== Cast ==
- Alessandro Gassmann as Pietro
- Claudia Gerini as Elsa
- Edoardo Leo as Enrico
- Kseniya Rappoport as Paola
- Richard Sammel as Viktor
- Valentina Cervi as Greta
- Fabrizio Rongione as Jacob
- Francesca Inaudi as Giulia
- Angeliqa Devi as Jasmine
- Mariana Tamayo as Isabel
- Alida Baldari Calabria as Anna
- Ángela Molina as Sister Raffaella

== Production ==
Liliana Cavani wrote the film's screenplay with Paolo Costella, in collaboration with Italian physicist Carlo Rovelli, known for the loop quantum theory of gravity, and whose books are international bestsellers. The film is freely inspired by Rovelli's 2017 essay of the same name, published by Adelphi, which explores quantum physics and physical and existential time, with the complexity and the mysteries it contains.

Principal photography began in September 2022 at a seaside villa in Sabaudia and was expected to continue until mid-October. The Order of Time is first feature film in over 20 years by Cavani, who was 89 years old at the time of the film's production. Enrico Lucidi served as director of photography.

The Order of Time was produced by Indiana Production, Vision Distribution and Gapbusters with Rai Cinema, in co-production with Shelter Prod, with the support of taxshelter.be and ING, with the support of the tax shelter of the Belgian federal government, in collaboration with Sky and Prime Video.

== Release ==
The Order of Time was selected to be screened out of competition at the 80th Venice International Film Festival, where it had its world premiere on 30 August 2023. It was theatrically released in Italy by Vision Distribution on 31 August 2023.
