= Altri Libertini =

Altri libertini
- Cover of Altri Libertini.
- Author: Pier Vittorio Tondelli
- Language: Italian
- Publisher: Feltrinelli
- Publication date: 1980
- Publication place: Italy
- Media type: Book
- Pages: 163
- ISBN: 88-07-83019-1
- OCLC: 78751906

Altri Libertini is the first book by the Italian writer, Pier Vittorio Tondelli.

It was published in 1980 by Feltrinelli and features a collection of six stories which are loosely related to one another: Postoristoro, Mimi e istrioni, Viaggio, Senso contrario, Altri libertini, and Autobahn. The stories present the lives and exploits of young men and women caught up in the 1980s, and Tondelli, through his writings, depicts their dreams, pains, emotional outbursts, ingenuity and, at times, their irreparable mistakes.

The book received considerable attention upon publication and was censored by the authorities for obscenities only twenty days after its appearance in bookstores in Italy as it was being prepared for its third edition.

While the book is a series of short stories, the author preferred to describe the work as a romanzo a episodi (serial novel), in order to emphasise the thread that connected all of the stories to each other.
