= Dinner Party (play) =

- Author: Pier Vittorio Tondelli
- Language: Italian
- Genre: play
- Publisher: Bompiani
- Publication date: 1994
- Publication place: Italy
- Pages: 132
- ISBN: 88-452-2246-2
- OCLC: 31137947
- LC Class: PQ4880.O47 D56 1994

Dinner Party is the only play written by the Italian author and novelist, Pier Vittorio Tondelli, originally in 1985 for the Riccione-Ater Theatre Prize and published by Bompiani in 1994 after Tondelli's death. The play features a series of conversations between the cast of characters, who assemble for an apparent innocent evening dinner on July 11, 1982. This date is significant in that it was the day that Italy won the World Championship (FIFA World Cup) in Spain (Italy beat West Germany, 3–1). However, events take an odd turn, and this innocent dinner becomes a comical, unusual drama. As the soccer match takes place, another 'game' takes place on the stage between the various characters at the Oldofredi house, which Tondelli describes as "a cruel yet entertaining game of coups de théâtre, betrayals, revelations and ambiguity."

== Cast of Characters ==
- Goffredo Oldofredi (referred to as Fredo throughout the play), a lawyer
- Giulia Oldofredi, wife of Fredo
- Manfredi Oldofredi, (referred to as Didi throughout the play), Fredo's younger brother; a writer
- Alberto Grandi, Fredo's best friend and also a friend of Didi's; an artist
- Mavie di Monterassi, an editor and friend of the family
- Tommy Trengrove, friend of the family and best friend to Fredo and Didi's deceased parents
- Annie, an actress/transvestite hired by Fredo to impersonate Alberto's girlfriend
- Jiga, Filipino maid who works for the Oldofredi

== Versions of the Play ==
Five different versions of the play existed at one point before the final product, each with various differences:

- The first version consisted of preparatory studies for the work
- The second version written in April 1984 in Bologna included a dramatic scene in which an ambulance is sent to the Casa Oldofredi to take Annie to the emergency room, after a rough encounter with Alberto, as well as the arrival of the police. References to the football match between the former West Germany and Italy are not mentioned, only alluded.
- The third version, written while Tondelli was living at Via Fondazza 40 in Bologna, was published by Bompiani in 1994.
- The fourth version, entitled La notte della vittora (Dinner Party) (The night of the victory) consists of 72 pages. This version premiered at the Riccione-Ater Theatre Prize in 1985. the main difference between this version and the previous one is the character of Jiga, whose part is noticeably reduced in this version.
- The fifth version was written between 1985 and 1986 during the author's time at Via Abbadesse, 52 in Milan. Tondelli reduces the importance of Alberto and changes the character of Tommy Trengrove to Tony Orteza, who is no longer a family friend but a business associate from Zurich. The style is drier and more blunt than the previous versions, and is totally devoided of irony.

== In Print ==
Dinner Party has been published by Bompiani in Italy in 1994 (ISBN 8845222462) as a single edition (with various reprints since) and 2000 (ISBN 8845244008) as part of the two volume set of Tondelli's works entitled: Opere : romanzi, teatro, racconti. Both monographs are in print and readily available.
