= The Dinner Party (talk show) =

- Genre: Talk show, food
- Created by: Elysabeth Alfano
- Presented by: Elysabeth Alfano
- Country of origin: United States
- Original language: English

Production
- Production locations: Chicago, IL
- Running time: 90 minutes
- Production company: Fear no ART

Original release
- Network: TiVo, WGN-TV
- Release: January 30, 2012 – present

Fear No ART Presents The Dinner Party is a live arts talk show that features host Elysabeth Alfano sitting down with three individuals from differing creative fields for a conversation over a dinner prepared by a guest chef. It premiered in January 2012. The show is also streamed live online and distributed through TiVo.

== Concept ==
The concept for the show originated in a dinner party that Alfano held at her home for several friends from the creative community in Chicago. That dinner resulted in lively conversations, and The Dinner Party was created as an attempt to replicate that experience with a public audience. Alfano specifically chooses guests from differing creative fields to discuss the commonalities between their work. The show's tagline is "The best conversations happen over dinner." Alfano is the creator, executive producer, and host of the show.

The audience is encouraged to participate in these conversations during the show. Both the live audience and those watching the internet broadcast of show are allowed to use Twitter to ask questions of the guests. Audience members who have their questions "picked" win prizes.

Guests in attendance at the live show are also share in the culinary experience; the audience is served the same appetizer and entrée as Alfano and her guests, in addition to wine samplings and Vosges chocolate.

Previous guests have included international violinist Rachel Barton Pine, rapper Dessa, Sound Opinions’ Jim DeRogatis, NPR’s Peter Sagal, Saturday Night Live alums Tim Kazurinsky and Nora Dunn, Project Runway’s Peach Carr, James Beard chef Paul Kahan, Michelin star chef Homaro Cantu, award winning director Steve James, international spoken word artist Kevin Coval, Goodman Theatre’s Robert Falls, Sex and the City and Chicago Fire TV star David Eigenburg, author Scott Turow, film critic Richard Roeper, Chicago Bears tight end Martellus Bennett and Chicago Bears general manager Phil Emery, among many others.

== Show Format ==
Each show begins with an opening act. The main show runs for 90 minutes, with host Elysabeth Alfano facilitating conversation between her three guests. Alfano picks guests from a variety of fields to talk about the creative experience. Each guest performs live or has their work featured in some way throughout the course of the show. Additionally, demo videos highlight the food that the chef prepares for the guests and the audience.

== Venue ==
The show premiered January 30, 2012 at the Mayne Stage in Chicago's Rogers Park neighborhood. The lineup featured artist Tony Fitzpatrick, artist and The Mekon’s band member Jon Langford, and director Rachel Rockford as guests, with Chef Homaro Cantu of MOTO.

On September 20, 2012, the show was held at Navy Pier as part of the inaugural EXPO Chicago Art Exhibition.

As of April 1, 2013, the show is held at City Winery Chicago in Chicago's West Loop neighborhood.
