= Pier Vittorio Tondelli =

Italian novelist

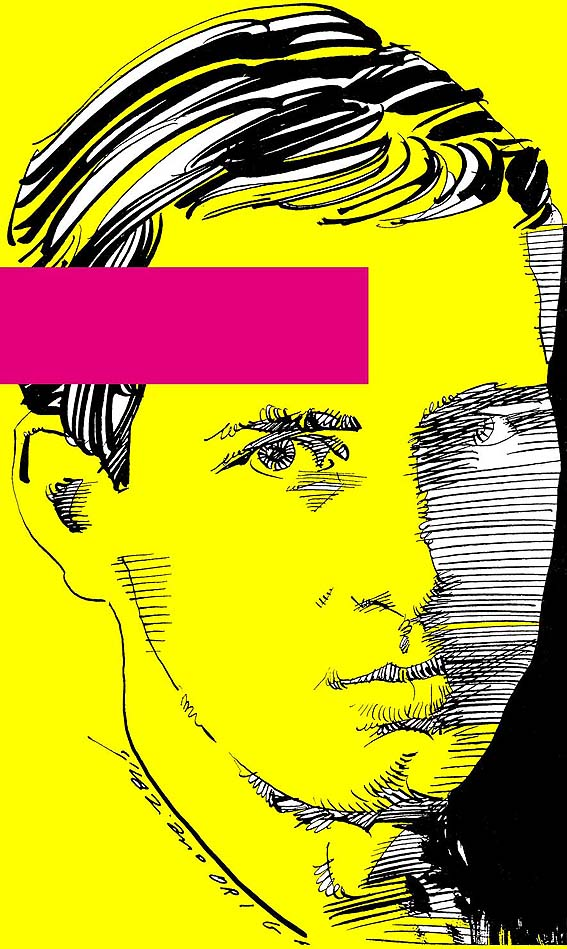
- Born: 14 September 1955; Correggio, Italy
- Died: 16 December 1991 (aged 36); Reggio Emilia, Italy
- Occupation: Novelist
- Writing career
- Literary movement: Post-Modernism

Pier Vittorio Tondelli (14 September 1955 – 16 December 1991) was an Italian writer who wrote a small but influential body of work. He was born in Correggio, a small town in the Emilia-Romagna region in Italy and died in nearby Reggio Emilia because of AIDS. Tondelli enjoyed modest success as a writer but often encountered trouble with censors for his use of homosexual themes in his works. Tondelli was buried in a small cemetery in the hamlet of Canolo, just outside Correggio.

== Biography ==
Tondelli developed an early interest in reading as an adolescent, reading what one might normally expect from a young adult male, Treasure Island, Journey to the Center of the Earth, and various Westerns. As he grew older, his reading tastes would develop. In 1974 he began to write his first narratives, saying: "I have always written, starting at 16 years of age with the usual story about adolescent frustrations". These adolescent frustrations are conflicts between Tondelli's religiosity, his desire to express his artistry, and his homosexual desires as well as a change in Tondelli's belief system, in which he writes: "I find it vulgar to pray to God side by side with people for whom God is different from my God." Tondelli developed a jealousy towards God, who he describes as unique to himself, developing a mysticism all of his own but admitted to losing something as his belief system matured.

Tondelli got his high school diploma in 1974 and then enrolled at the University of Bologna's liberal arts department. There he took courses with Umberto Eco and Gianni Celati. In 1979, he sent a manuscript to Aldo Tagliaferri. Tondelli credits Tagliaferri with teaching and guiding him in his writing, reinforcing upon the young author the necessity of re-writing one's work. A year later in January 1980, Altri Libertini was published. The following month, Tondelli graduated from the University of Bologna.

In April 1980, Tondelli was called up for military service, which was compulsory at the time. He stationed at Orvieto and then in Rome. Tondelli's military service provided him with the necessary experience to write two works, Il diario del soldato Acci and Pao Pao.

== Works ==
Many of Tondelli's works have been published by Bompiani in a two-volume set. Volume 1 contains his novels and short stories, and Volume 2 contains more stories, essays, conversations and miscellaneous writings. Volume 1 includes an introduction and chronology by Fulvio Panzeri: Opere. Milano: Bompiani, 2000. ISBN 88-452-4438-5. Volume 2 contains an extensive bibliography on Tondelli and his work.

- Altri Libertini (1980)
- Il Diario Del Soldato Acci (1981)
- Rimini (1985)
- Camere Separate (1989)
- Pao Pao (1989)
- Un weekend postmoderno. Cronache dagli anni ottanta (1990)
- L'abbandono. Racconti degli anni Ottanta (1993)
- Dinner Party (1994)
- Biglietti Agli Amici (1997)
- Racconti
  - La casa!...La casa!...
  - Desperados
  - Attraversamento dell'addio
  - Ragazzi a Natale
  - Pier a gennaio
  - Questa specie di patto
  - My sweet car
  - Un racconto sul vino
  - Sabato italiano

== Criticism and interpretation ==
Although most of the criticism of Tondelli is in Italian, a few monographs have been published in English.

=== In English ===
- Baranski, Zygmunt G. and Lino Pertile. The New Italian Novel. Writers of Italy. Edinburgh: Edinburgh University Press, 1993.
- Duncan, Derek. Reading and Writing Italian Homosexuality: A Case of Possible Difference. Aldershot, Hampshire, England: Ashgate, 2006.
- Pallotta, Augustus. Italian Novelists Since World War II, 1965-1995. Dictionary of literary biography, v. 196. Detroit, Mich: Gale Research, 1998.

=== In Italian ===
- Elena Buia. Verso casa : viaggio nella narrativa di Pier Vittorio Tondelli, 2000.
- Viller Masoni, and Fulvio Panzeri. Studi per Tondelli: le tesi di laurea e i saggi critici del Premio Tondelli 2001. Parma: Monte Università Parma, 2002.
- Elisabetta Mondello. In principio fu Tondelli: letteratura, merci, televisione nella narrativa degli anni Novanta. Cultura, 601. Milano: Il saggiatore, 2007.
- Massimiliano Chiamenti. "Verba (cartacea) manent: varianti autografe in "Altri libertini" di Pier Vittorio Tondelli". Cambridge: The Italianist, 2007.
- Enrico Palandri. Pier: Tondelli e la generazione. Contromano. Roma: Laterza, 2005.
- Enos Rota. Caro Pier--: i lettori di Tondelli: ritratto di una generazione. Milano: Selene, 2002.
- Sciltian Gastaldi. Tondelli: scrittore totale. Il racconto degli anni Ottanta fra impegno, camp e controcultura gay. Roma: Pendragon, 2021.
