= Gabriella Pession =

American-born Italian actress (born 1977)

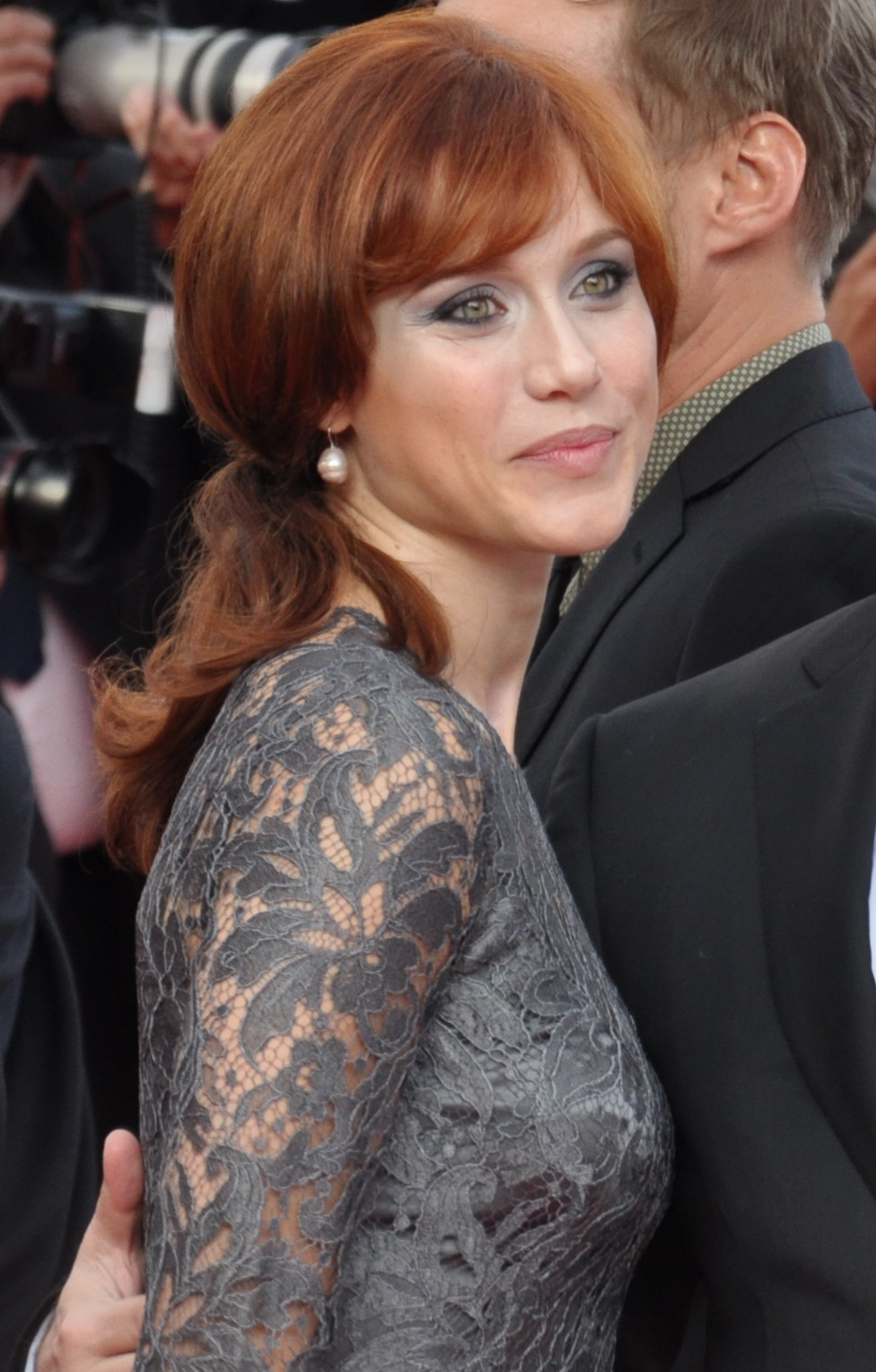
- Pession at the 2013 Monte-Carlo Television Festival.
- Born: November 2, 1977 (age 48); Daytona Beach, Florida, U.S.
- Occupation: Actress
- Years active: 1997–present
- Spouse: Richard Flood (m. 2016)
- Children: 1
- Website: www.gabriellapession.it/home/

Gabriella Pession (/pɛsˈjɒn/ pes-YON; born November 2, 1977) is an Italian actress.

== Biography ==
Gabriella Pession was born in Florida. From 2013 to 2015 she starred in the TV show Crossing Lines. In 2015, she received the America Award from the Italy–USA Foundation.

=== Personal life ===
In 2014 she had a son, Giulio, with her Crossing Lines co-star Richard Flood. They got married in 2016.

== Filmography ==
=== Films ===
Year	Title	Role	Notes
1997	Fireworks	Woman at restaurant	Uncredited
1999	Ferdinando and Carolina	Maria Carolina of Austria	
1999	The Fish in Love	Lucilla Pacini	
2001	La verità vi spiego sull'amore	Gisella	
2002	Operazione Rosmarino	Rossella	
2004	Love Is Eternal While It Lasts	Stella	
2005	L'uomo perfetto	Maria	
2007	13 Roses	Adelina García Casillas	
2007	Milano Palermo - Il ritorno	Elda Fiore	
2009	Mejor que nunca	Sybila	
2009	Oggi sposi	Sabrina Monti	
2011	Ex 2: Still Friends?	Valentina	
2016	L'amore rubato	Anna	
2018	Se son rose	Elettra	

=== Television ===
Year	Title	Role	Notes
1998	Cronaca nera	Giorgia	Episode: "Delitti al Toraccio"
1999	Jesus	Salome	Television film
2000	Giornalisti	Anna Restella	Main role; 13 episodes
2002	Don Matteo	Barbara	Episode: "Beauty Farm"
2003	Ferrari	Floriana Ferrari	Miniseries
2004–2006	Orgoglio	Elisa Deodato	Main role; 39 episodes
2005–2007	Il capitano	Margherita Passanti	Main role (season 1), recurring role (season 2); 9 episodes
2006	Crimini	Elisa	Episode: "Rapidamente"
2006–2008	Capri	Vittoria Mari	Lead role (seasons 1–2); 37 episodes
2009	Lo smemorato di Collegno	Giulia Canella	Miniseries
2011	Dove la trovi una come me?	Sonia Longhi	Miniseries
2011	Wilfred	Cinzia	Episode: "Sacrifice"
2011–2013	Rossella	Rossella Andrei in Sallustio	Lead role; 12 episodes
2013–2014	Crossing Lines	Eva Vittoria	Main role (seasons 1–2); 22 episodes
2016	Il sistema	Daria Fabbri	Main role; 6 episodes
2017–2023	La porta rossa	Anna Meyer	Main role; 32 episodes
2019	Oltre la soglia	Tosca Navarro	Lead role; 12 episodes
2021	Station 19	Dr. Gabriella Aurora	Episodes: "Make No Mistakes", "Comfortably Numb"
2022–present	Tell Me Lies	Marianne	Recurring role; 10 episodes
2024	Those About to Die	Antonia	Lead role; 10 episodes
2024	The Count of Monte Cristo	Hermine Danglars	8 episodes

== Theater ==
- La verità vi prego sull'amore, directed by Francesco Apolloni (1998)
- Storia d'amore e d'anarchia, directed by Lina Wertmüller (2002–03)
