= The Order of Time (book) =

2017 book by Carlo Rovelli

- First Italian edition (2017)
- Author: Carlo Rovelli
- Original title: L'ordine del tempo
- Language: Italian
- Subject: Physics
- Genre: Non-fiction
- Publisher: Penguin Books (English edition)
- Publication date: 2017
- Publication place: Italy
- English publication date: 2018
- Media type: Print, Digital, Audio CD
- Pages: 224 (English edition)
- ISBN: 9780241292525 (English hardcover edition)

The Order of Time (Italian: L'ordine del tempo) is a book by Italian physicist Carlo Rovelli, a specialist in quantum gravity research, about time in physics. An audiobook, four hours and nineteen minutes long, was read by Benedict Cumberbatch.

== Contents ==
The Order of Time is divided into three sections, covering the theory of relativity, space-time, loop quantum gravity, and thermodynamics. The first section, The Crumbling of Time, opens with Rovelli explaining time, which is considered as a fourth dimension in space-time. He then discusses Ludwig Boltzmann's concept of entropy, which never decreases, and its role in thermodynamics and Bayesian probability theory, which Rovelli described as "the only equation of fundamental physics that knows any difference between past and future", and concluded that the direction of time is lost. In the second part, The World without Time, Rovelli writes that events constitute the universe instead of particles, and introduces the concept of quanta of time in loop quantum gravity. The final section, The Sources of Time, proposes that the apparent flow of time is due to the inability to observe all the microscopic details of the world.

== Reception ==
Writing for The Guardian, Ian Thomson praised the "lucid" writing, translation, and compared it to Seven Brief Lessons on Physics, describing it as a "a deeper, more abstruse meditation" but "jargon-free". Cosmologist Anthony Aguirre, in a generally positive review, noted that some portions of the book "occupy a frustrating ground between too technical and not technical enough". Literary Review noted Rovelli's skill for presenting complex and even unexplainable concepts in an accessible form, "the brevity and elegance of which belie its depth."

== Film adaptation ==
In 2023, a freely inspired film adaptation of Rovelli's work was released. It was directed by Liliana Cavani, from a screenplay written by Cavani and Paolo Costella in collaboration with Carlo Rovelli. The film tells the story of a gathering of old friends at a seaside villa who soon discover that the world might be ending within the space of a few hours.
