= Carlo Rovelli =

Italian theoretical physicist and writer (born 1956)

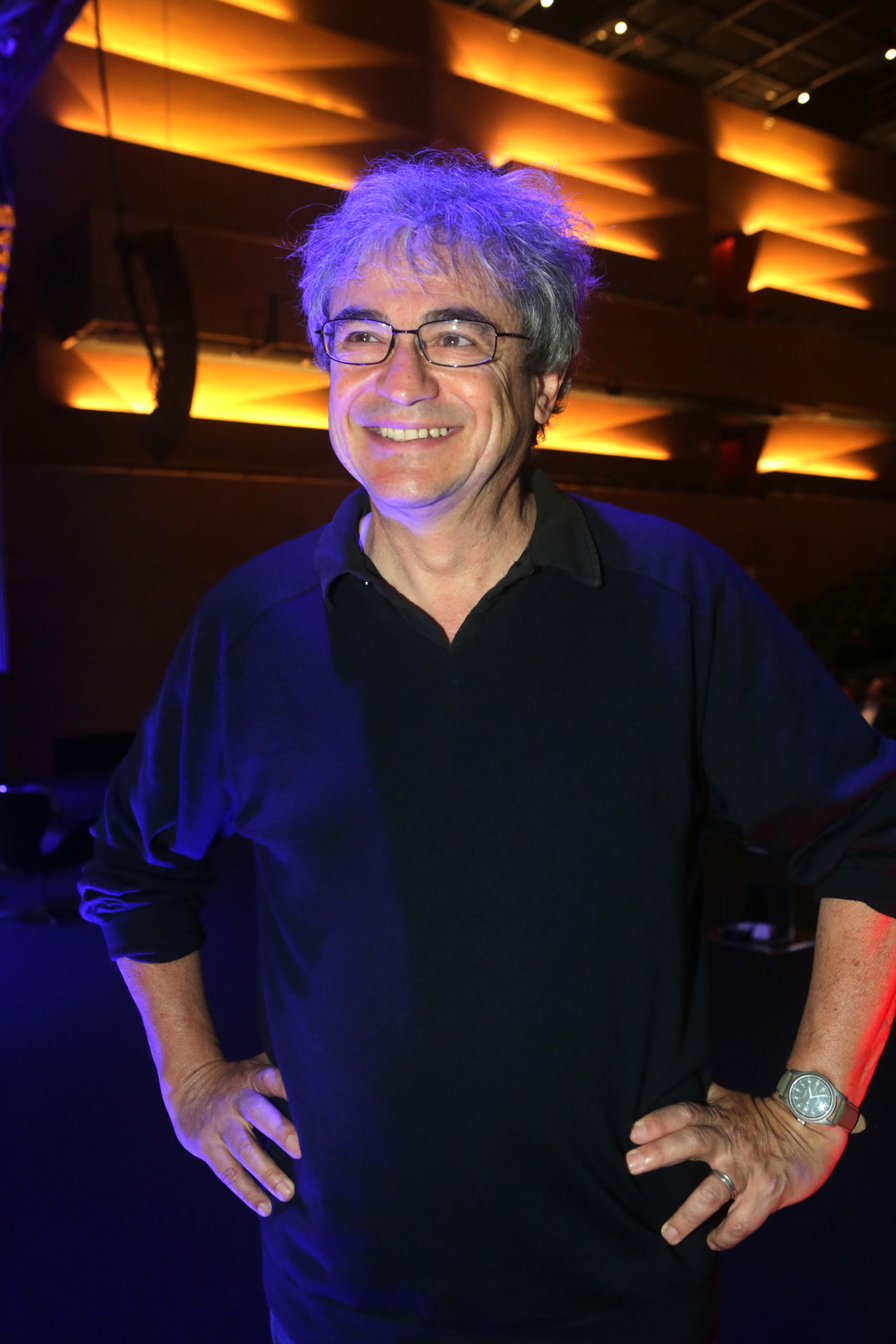
- Rovelli in 2017
- Born: 3 May 1956 (age 70); Verona, Italy
- Education: University of Bologna; University of Padua
- Known for: Loop quantum gravity; Relational interpretation of quantum mechanics; Thermal time hypothesis; Timeless formulation of physical laws
- Awards: Lewis Thomas Prize (2024); (2004); International Xanthopoulos Award (1995)
- Scientific career
- Fields: Theoretical physics
- Workplaces: University of Pittsburgh; Aix-Marseille University; Sapienza University of Rome; Syracuse University; Yale University; Perimeter Institute; Western University; Santa Fe Institute
- Doctoral advisor: Marco Toller

Signature
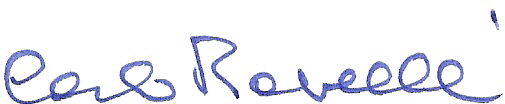

Carlo Rovelli (born 3 May 1956) is an Italian theoretical physicist and writer who has worked in Italy, the United States, France, and Canada. He is currently Emeritus Professor at the Centre de Physique Théorique of Marseille in France, a Distinguished Visiting Research Chair at the Perimeter Institute, core member of the Rotman Institute of Philosophy of Western University in Canada, and Fractal Faculty of the Santa Fe Institute in The United States.

Rovelli works mainly in the field of quantum gravity and is a founder of the theory of loop quantum gravity. He has also worked in the history and philosophy of science, formulating the relational quantum mechanics and the notion of thermal time. He collaborates with several Italian newspapers, including the cultural supplements of the Corriere della Sera, Il Sole 24 Ore, and La Repubblica. His popular science book, Seven Brief Lessons on Physics, was originally published in Italian in 2014. It has sold over two million copies worldwide.

In 2019, he was included by Foreign Policy magazine in the list of the 100 most influential global thinkers. In 2021, he was included by Prospect magazine in the list of the 50 world's top thinkers.

== Life and career ==
Carlo Rovelli was born in Verona, Italy, on 3 May 1956. He attended the Liceo Classico Scipione Maffei in Verona. In the 1970s, he participated in the student political movements in Italian universities. He was involved with the free political radio stations Radio Alice in Bologna and Radio Anguana in Verona, which he helped found. In conjunction with his political activity, he was charged, but later released, for crimes of opinion related to the book Fatti Nostri, which he co-authored with Enrico Palandri, Maurizio Torrealta, and Claudio Piersanti.

Rovelli has credited his occasional use of LSD at this time with an influence on his later interest in theoretical physics, saying of his experience: "it was an extraordinarily strong experience that touched me also intellectually... Among the strange phenomena was the sense of time stopping. Things were happening in my mind but the clock was not going ahead; the flow of time was not passing any more... And I thought: ‘Well, it's a chemical that is changing things in my brain. But how do I know that the usual perception is right, and this is wrong? If these two ways of perceiving are so different, what does it mean that one is the correct one?"

In 1981, Rovelli graduated with a BS/MS in physics from the University of Bologna, and in 1986 he obtained his PhD at the University of Padova, Italy. Rovelli refused military service, which was compulsory in Italy at the time, and was therefore briefly detained in 1977. He held postdoctoral positions at the University of Rome, the International School for Advanced Studies in Trieste, and Yale University. Rovelli was on the faculty of the University of Pittsburgh from 1990 to 2000, where he was also affiliated with the Department of History and Philosophy of Science. Since 2000 he has been a professor at the Centre de Physique Théorique de Luminy of Aix-Marseille University in France.

== Main contributions ==
=== Loop quantum gravity ===
In 1988, Rovelli, Lee Smolin and Abhay Ashtekar introduced a theory of quantum gravity called loop quantum gravity. In 1995, Rovelli and Smolin obtained a basis of states of quantum gravity, labelled by Penrose's spin networks, and using this basis they were able to show that the theory predicts that area and volume are quantized. This result indicates the existence of a discrete structure of space on a very small scale. In 1997, Rovelli and Michael Reisenberger introduced a "sum over surfaces" formulation of the theory, which has since evolved into the currently covariant "spin foam" version of loop quantum gravity. In 2008, in collaboration with Jonathan Engle and Roberto Pereira, he has introduced the spin foam vertex amplitude which is the basis of the current definition of the loop quantum gravity covariant dynamics. Loop theory is today considered a candidate for a quantum theory of gravity. It finds applications in quantum cosmology, spinfoam cosmology and quantum black hole physics.

=== Physics without time ===
In his 2004 book, Quantum Gravity, Rovelli developed a formulation of classical and quantum mechanics that does not make explicit reference to the notion of time. The first step towards a theory of quantum gravity without a time variable is described by Wheeler–DeWitt equation. The timeless formalism is used to describe the world in the regimes where the quantum properties of the gravitational field cannot be disregarded. This is because the quantum fluctuation of spacetime itself makes the notion of time unsuitable for writing physical laws in the conventional form of evolution laws in time.

This position led him to face the following problem: if time is not part of the fundamental theory of the world, then how does time emerge? In 1993, in collaboration with Alain Connes, Rovelli proposed a solution to this problem called the thermal time hypothesis. According to this hypothesis, time emerges only in a thermodynamic or statistical context. If this is correct, the flow of time is not fundamental, deriving from the incompleteness of knowledge. Similar conclusions had been reached earlier in the context of nonequilibrium statistical mechanics, in particular in the work of Robert Zwanzig, and in Caldeira-Leggett models used in quantum dissipation.

=== Relational quantum mechanics ===
In 1994, Rovelli introduced the relational interpretation of quantum mechanics, based on the idea that the quantum state of a system must always be interpreted relative to another physical system (in the same way that the "velocity of an object" is always relative to another object, in classical mechanics). The idea has been developed and analyzed in particular by Bas van Fraassen and by Michel Bitbol. Among other important consequences, it provides a solution of the EPR paradox that does not violate locality. Rovelli has expressed the main idea of relational quantum mechanics in the popular book Helgoland. In Helgoland the universe is concidered a "[...] web of entanglement". or in terms of Lambros Couloubaritsis a polyplocology.

=== Relative information ===
Rovelli won the second prize in the 2013 FQXi contest "It From Bit or Bit From It?" for his essay about "relative information". His paper, Relative Information at the Foundation of Physics, discusses how "Shannon's notion of relative information between two physical systems can function as [a] foundation for statistical mechanics and quantum mechanics, without referring to subjectivism or idealism...[This approach can] represent a key missing element in the foundation of the naturalistic picture of the world." In 2017, Rovelli elaborated further upon the subject of relative information, writing that:

In nature, variables are not independent; for instance, in any magnet, the two ends have opposite polarities. Knowing one amounts to knowing the other. So we can say that each end "has information" about the other. There is nothing mental in this; it is just a way of saying that there is a necessary relation between the polarities of the two ends. We say that there is "relative information" between two systems anytime the state of one is constrained by the state of the other. In this precise sense, physical systems may be said to have information about one another, with no need for a mind to play any role. Such "relative information" is ubiquitous in nature: The colour of the light carries information about the object the light has bounced from; a virus has information about the cell it may attach, and neurons have information about one another. Since the world is a knit tangle of interacting events, it teems with relative information. When this information is exploited for survival, extensively elaborated by our brain, and may be coded in a language understood by a community, it becomes mental, and it acquires the semantic weight that we commonly attribute to the notion of information. But the basic ingredient is down there in the physical world: physical correlation between distinct variables. The physical world is not a set of self-absorbed entities that do their selfish things. It is a tightly knitted net of relative information, where everybody's state reflects somebody else's state. We understand physical, chemical, biological, social, political, astrophysical, and cosmological systems in terms of these nets of relations, not in terms of individual behaviour. Physical relative information is a powerful basic concept for describing the world. Before "energy," "matter," or even "entity."

=== History and philosophy of science ===
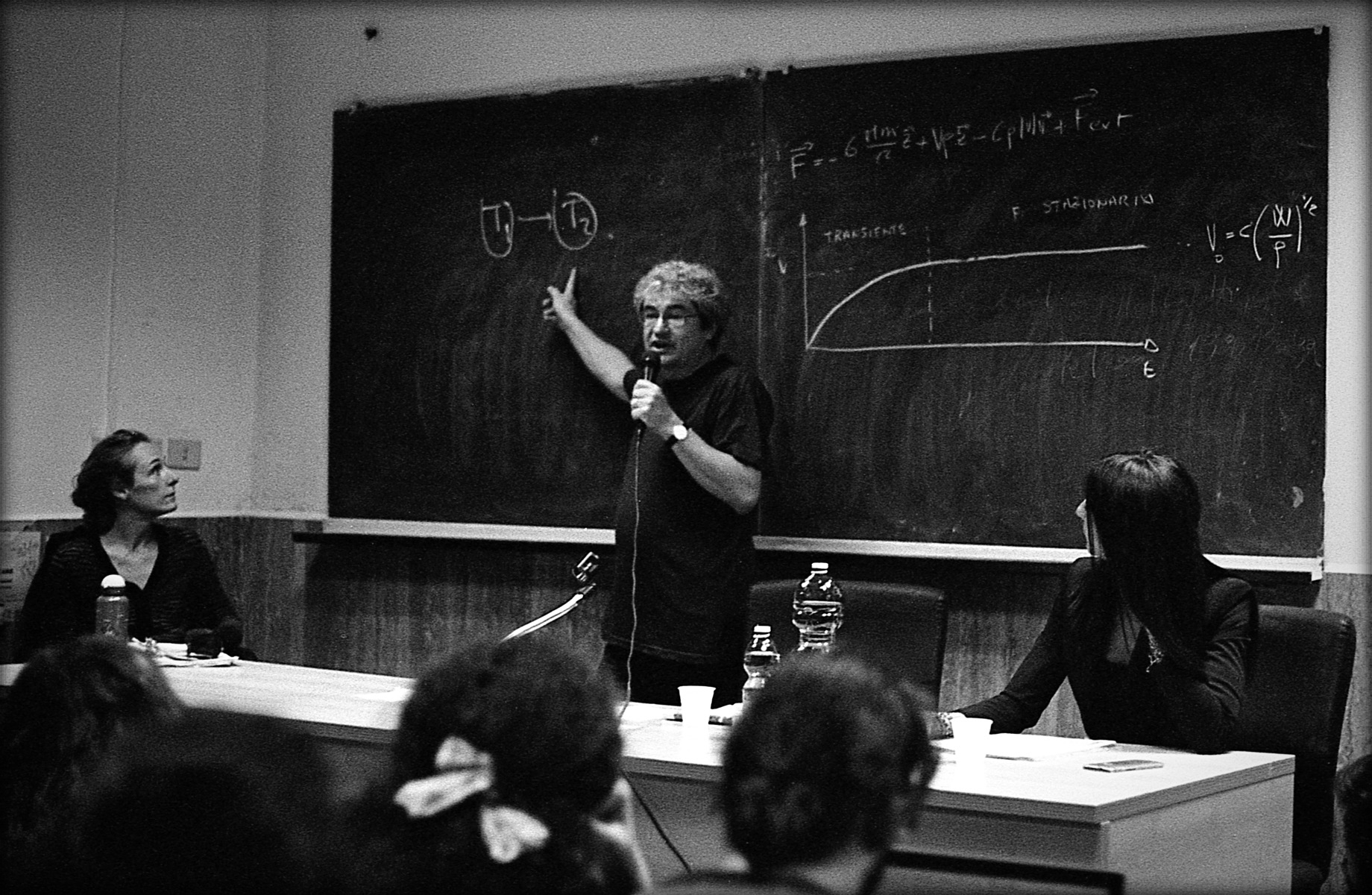
Rovelli in Rome, 2015

Rovelli has written a book on the Greek philosopher Anaximander, published in France, Italy, US and Brazil. The book analyses the main aspects of scientific thinking and articulates Rovelli's views on science. Anaximander is presented in the book as a main initiator of scientific thinking – it is almost a hagiography.

For Rovelli, science is a continuous process of exploring novel possible views of the world; this happens via a "learned rebellion", which always builds and relies on previous knowledge but at the same time continuously questions aspects of this received knowledge. The foundation of science, therefore, is not certainty but the very opposite, a radical uncertainty about our own knowledge, or equivalently, an acute awareness of the extent of our ignorance.

=== Religious views ===
Rovelli defines himself as "serenely atheist". He discussed his religious views in several articles and in his book on Anaximander. He argues that the conflict between rational/scientific thinking and structured religion may find periods of truce ("there is no contradiction between solving Maxwell's equations and believing that God created Heaven and Earth"), but it is ultimately unsolvable, because most religions demand the acceptance of some unquestionable truths, while scientific thinking is based on the continuous questioning of any truth. Thus, for Rovelli, the source of the conflict is not the pretense of science to give answers – for Rovelli, the universe is full of mystery and a source of awe and emotions – but, on the contrary, the source of the conflict is the acceptance of our ignorance at the foundation of science, which clashes with religions' pretense to be depositories of certain knowledge.

== Political engagement, pacifism, and controversies ==
Rovelli's first book was on the Italian student political movements in the 1970s. He later refused Italy's compulsory military draft and was briefly detained. In 2021, he coordinated the Global Peace Dividend, an open letter signed by more than 50 Nobel Laureates, including the Dalai Lama, calling for all countries to negotiate a balanced cut on their military spending by 2% a year for the next five years, and put half the saved money in a UN fund to combat pandemics, the climate crisis, and extreme poverty.

On 1 May 2023, Rovelli gave a political speech at the large Italian Labour Day concert in Rome, inviting the youth to engage politically for the environment, economical equality and peace, and criticizing the Italian Defence Minister Guido Crosetto for what he claims was his direct involvement with what he calls the industrial military complex. The speech raised a large controversy. As a consequence, his invitation to represent Italy at the 2024 Frankfurt Book Fair was cancelled; the cancellation itself was widely criticized, leading to his re-invitation, and the resignation of the Italian Commissary for the Buchmesse. Rovelli repeated his call for reduced military spending and improved international cooperation following the outbreak of the Gaza war. That same year, he was one of the signatories of the International Peace Conference manifesto, which accuses the United States, the European Union, and NATO of being a driving force behind the Russian invasion of Ukraine.

== Main awards ==
- 2026 Medaglia d'Oro Maison des Artistes.
- 2024 Lewis Thomas Prize for Writing About Science ("In the conflicted world of 2024, the abiding, idealistic voice of Rovelli's essay collection There Are Places in the World Where Rules Are Less Important Than Kindness feels especially valuable.")
- 1995 International Xanthopoulos Award of the International Society for General Relativity and Gravitation, "for outstanding contributions to theoretical physics"
- Senior member of the Institut Universitaire de France
- Laurea Honoris Causa National University of General San Martín
- Honorary Professor of the Beijing Normal University in China
- Member of the Académie Internationale de Philosophie des Sciences
- Honorary member of the Accademia di Scienze Arti e Lettere di Verona
- 2009 First "community" prize of the FQXi contest on the "nature of time"
- 2013 Second prize of the FQXi contest on the "relation between physics and information"
- 2014 Premio Letterario Merck for the book Reality Is Not What It Seems: The Journey to Quantum Gravity
- 2015 Premio Pagine di Scienza di Rosignano for the book Reality Is Not What It Seems: The Journey to Quantum Gravity
- 2015 Premio Alassio centolibri per l'informazione culturale
- 2015 Premio Larderello
- 2015 Premio letterario Galileo per la divulgazione scientifica for the book Reality Is Not What It Seems: The Journey to Quantum Gravity

== In popular culture ==
- Rovelli appeared as a Disney character in a Mickey Mouse story in the Italian Disney publication of Topolino.
- In November 2022 Carlo Rovelli and rock band Belladonna released the single "Nothing Shines Unless It Burns". In October 2023 the song entered the Grammy Awards ballot in the Best Rock Performance category.
- In the science fiction novel Mars Trilogy by Kim Stanley Robinson, set in a future century, Rovelli and Lee Smolin appear as historical characters in the history of physics. In the novel, Loop quantum gravity has merged to string theory to give a comprehensive physical theory of the world.
- The book The Order of Time has been published in audiobook format read by the British actor Benedict Cumberbatch.
- In Treacle Walker (2021) Alan Garner chose a quote from Rovelli's The Order of Time (L'ordine del tempo, 2017) as the epigraph for his book.
- The 2023 film The Order of Time, directed by Liliana Cavani, is inspired by Rovelli's book of the same title. Rovelli collaborated with the screenwriting.
- Interviews on BBC radio:
  - The BBC Radio 4 show Desert Island Discs in summer 2017.
  - The BBC Radio 4 show The Life Scientific in 2018 (discussing his career in science).
  - The BBC Radio 3 show Private Passions in 2020 (discussing time in music and science)
  - The BBC Radio 4 show A Good Read in 2020 (discussing books).
- In 2022 Rovelli appeared in the Netflix documentary A Trip to Infinity, discussing the mathematical implications of infinity.
- He appeared on BBC Radio 4's The Museum of Curiosity in February 2023. His hypothetical donation to this imaginary museum was a white hole.

== Books and articles ==
Rovelli has written more than 200 scientific articles published in international journals. He has published two monographs on loop quantum gravity and several popular science books. His book, Seven Brief Lessons on Physics, has been translated into 41 languages.

=== Scientific books ===
- Quantum Gravity, Cambridge University Press, 2004, ISBN 0-521-83733-2
- With Francesca Vidotto, Covariant Loop Quantum Gravity: An Elementary Introduction to Quantum Gravity and Spinfoam Theory, Cambridge University Press, 2014, ISBN 978-1107069626

=== Popular books ===
- Anaximander: And the Birth of Science, Penguin Random House, 2023 (republication of The First Scientist: Anaximander and his legacy, Westholme Publishing, 2011)
- Helgoland, Penguin Random House 2021 / Helgoland, Adelphi, 2020.
- There Are Places in the World Where Rules Are Less Important Than Kindness, Penguin Random House, 2020 / Ci sono luoghi al mondo dove più che le regole è importante la gentilezza, Solferino, 2020.
- The Order of Time, Penguin Random House, 2018 / L'ordine del tempo, Adelphi, 2017.
- Reality Is Not What It Seems: The Journey to Quantum Gravity, Penguin Random House, 2016 / La realtà non è come ci appare: La struttura elementare delle cose, Raffaello Cortina Editore, 2014.
- Seven Brief Lessons on Physics, Penguin Random House, 2015 / Sette brevi lezioni di fisica, Adelphi, 2014.
- Marion Lignana Rosenberg (translator), The First Scientist: Anaximander and his legacy, Westholme Publishing, 2011 / Che cos'è la Scienza. La rivoluzione di Anassimandro., Mondadori, 2012.
- What is time, what is space? (interview), Di Renzo Editore, 2006 / Che cos'è il tempo, che cos'é lo spazio?, Di Renzo Editore, 2004.
- Bologna, marzo 1977 ...fatti nostri..., a cura di e con Enrico Palandri, Claudio Piersanti, Maurizio Torrealta et alii, Verona, Bertani, 1977; Rimini, NdA press, 2007, ISBN 978-88-89035-17-7.
- General Relativity: The Essentials, Cambridge University Press, 2021.
- White Holes, Penguin Random House, 2023
- 85 Seconds to Midnight: A Physicist's Argument Against Rearmament, Penguin Random House, 2026
- On the Equality of All Things: Physics and Philosophy, Penguin Random House, 2026
