= Seven Brief Lessons on Physics =

2014 book by Carlo Rovelli

- Author: Carlo Rovelli
- Original title: Sette brevi lezioni di fisica
- Language: Italian
- Subject: Physics
- Genre: Non-fiction
- Publisher: Penguin Books (English edition)
- Publication date: 2014
- Publication place: Italy
- English publication date: 2015
- Media type: Print, Digital
- Pages: 96 (English edition)
- ISBN: 9780241235966 (English hardcover edition)
- Website: sevenbrieflessons.com

Seven Brief Lessons on Physics (Italian: Sette brevi lezioni di fisica) is a short book by the Italian physicist Carlo Rovelli. Originally published in Italian in 2014, the book had been translated into 52 languages as of 2021. More than a million copies have been sold, of which more than 400,000 occurred in Italy.

== Overview ==
The book condenses the revelations of post-Newtonian physics – from Einstein's theory of relativity to quantum mechanics – into seven brief, accessible lessons. These were originally serialised in an Italian newspaper. Rovelli uses a literary approach, for instance, highlighting a year Einstein spent apparently aimlessly with the comment that those who don't waste time, won't get anywhere.

The chapters are:

1. The Most Beautiful of Theories
2. The Quanta
3. The Architecture of the Cosmos
4. Particles
5. Grains of Space
6. Probability, Time and the Heat of Black Holes
7. Ourselves
