= Lists of British television episodes =

This is a list of lists of British television episodes.

== Action ==
- List of The Adventures of Robin Hood episodes
- List of The Avengers (TV series) episodes
- List of The Avengers (radio series) episodes
- List of Callan episodes
- List of Danger Man episodes
- List of Dempsey and Makepeace episodes
- List of Freewheelers episodes
- List of Merlin episodes
- List of The Professionals episodes
- List of Robin Hood (2006 TV series) episodes
- List of The Saint episodes
- List of Space: 1999 episodes
- List of Spooks episodes
- List of Strike Back episodes
- List of Terrahawks episodes
- List of Thunderbirds Are Go episodes
- List of Thunderbirds episodes

== Animation ==
- List of The Adventures of Paddington episodes
- List of The Amazing World of Gumball episodes
- List of The Animals of Farthing Wood episodes
- List of Apple & Onion episodes
- List of Ben & Holly's Little Kingdom episodes
- List of Bing episodes
- List of Bob the Builder (2015 TV series) episodes
- List of Bob the Builder episodes
- List of The Cat in the Hat Knows a Lot About That! episodes
- List of Charlie and Lola episodes
- List of Chuggington episodes
- List of Count Duckula episodes
- List of Counterfeit Cat episodes
- List of The Cramp Twins episodes
- List of Creature Comforts episodes
- List of Danger Mouse (1981 TV series) episodes
- List of Danger Mouse (2015 TV series) episodes
- List of Dennis the Menace and Gnasher (2009 TV series) episodes
- List of The Dreamstone episodes
- List of Everything's Rosie episodes
- List of Fireman Sam episodes
- List of Gogs episodes
- List of Grizzly Tales for Gruesome Kids episodes
- List of Hero: 108 episodes
- List of Hey Duggee episodes
- List of Horrid Henry episodes
- List of Jelly Jamm episodes
- List of Kate & Mim-Mim episodes
- List of Kipper episodes
- List of Sunny Bunnies episodes
- List of Magic Adventures of Mumfie episodes
- List of Max Steel (2013 TV series) episodes
- List of Mr. Bean: The Animated Series episodes
- List of Octonauts episodes
- List of Olivia episodes
- List of Peppa Pig episodes
- List of Pingu episodes
- List of PJ Masks episodes
- List of Pocoyo episodes
- List of Postman Pat episodes
- List of Randy Cunningham: 9th Grade Ninja episodes
- List of Redwall episodes
- List of The Ricky Gervais Show (TV series) episodes
- List of Robotboy episodes
- List of Rupert episodes
- List of Sarah & Duck episodes
- List of Shaun the Sheep episodes
- List of Skatoony episodes
- List of Sunny Day episodes
- List of Thunderbirds Are Go episodes
- List of Timmy Time episodes
- List of The Trap Door episodes
- List of The Wombles episodes
- List of Zack & Quack episodes
- List of ZZZap! episodes

== BBC ==
- List of 2point4 Children episodes
- List of Absolutely Fabulous episodes
- List of Are You Being Served? episodes
- List of As Time Goes By episodes
- List of Bad Education episodes
- List of The Basil Brush Show episodes
- List of Birds of a Feather episodes
- List of A Bit of Fry & Laurie episodes
- List of Bob the Builder episodes
- List of The Brittas Empire episodes
- List of Celebrity Mastermind episodes
- List of Chalk episodes
- List of Citizen Smith episodes
- List of Coupling episodes
- List of Danger Mouse (2015 TV series) episodes
- List of Dinnerladies episodes
- List of Extras episodes
- List of Fireman Sam episodes
- List of Friday Night with Jonathan Ross episodes
- List of Game On episodes
- List of Gimme Gimme Gimme episodes
- List of Goodnight Sweetheart episodes
- List of Have I Got News for You episodes
- List of HolbyBlue episodes
- List of How Not to Live Your Life episodes
- List of Insert Name Here episodes
- List of It Ain't Half Hot Mum episodes
- List of Mock the Week episodes
- List of My Family episodes
- List of My Hero episodes
- List of Postman Pat episodes
- List of QI episodes
- List of Shaun the Sheep episodes
- List of Still Game episodes
- List of Tracey Ullman's Show episodes

== Children ==
- List of 4 O'Clock Club episodes
- List of 64 Zoo Lane episodes
- List of The Adventures of Paddington episodes
- List of The Adventures of Robin Hood episodes
- List of Almost Never episodes
- List of The Animals of Farthing Wood episodes
- List of Apple & Onion episodes
- List of As the Bell Rings (British TV series) episodes
- List of The Basil Brush Show episodes
- List of Bear Behaving Badly episodes
- List of Ben & Holly's Little Kingdom episodes
- List of Bernard's Watch episodes
- List of Blue Peter episodes
- List of Bob the Builder (2015 TV series) episodes
- List of Bob the Builder episodes
- List of Charlie and Lola episodes
- List of ChuckleVision episodes
- List of Chuggington episodes
- List of Come Outside episodes
- List of Count Duckula episodes
- List of Danger Mouse (1981 TV series) episodes
- List of Danger Mouse (2015 TV series) episodes
- List of Dani's Castle episodes
- List of Dani's House episodes
- List of Dennis the Menace and Gnasher (2009 TV series) episodes
- List of Dixi episodes
- List of The Dumping Ground episodes
- List of Evacuation episodes
- List of Eve (British TV series) episodes
- List of Everything's Rosie episodes
- List of Fireman Sam episodes
- List of Fraggle Rock episodes
- List of Freewheelers episodes
- List of Genie in the House episodes
- List of Grange Hill episodes
- List of Grizzly Tales for Gruesome Kids episodes
- List of Hank Zipzer episodes
- List of Hey Duggee episodes
- List of Horrible Histories (2009 TV series) episodes
- List of In the Night Garden... episodes
- List of Jackanory episodes
- List of Jeopardy episodes
- List of Kate & Mim-Mim episodes
- List of Kipper episodes
- List of Oddbods episodes
- List of Sunny Bunnies episodes
- List of M.I. High episodes
- List of The Magicians (British TV series) episodes
- List of Maid Marian and Her Merry Men episodes
- List of Millie Inbetween episodes
- List of My Parents Are Aliens episodes
- List of Octonauts episodes
- List of Odd Squad episodes
- List of Peppa Pig episodes
- List of Pocoyo episodes
- List of Postman Pat episodes
- List of Press Gang episodes
- List of The Queen's Nose episodes
- List of Rainbow episodes
- List of Randy Cunningham: 9th Grade Ninja episodes
- List of Renford Rejects episodes
- List of Rentaghost episodes
- List of Robin Hood (2006 TV series) episodes
- List of Rupert episodes
- List of Sadie J episodes
- List of Sarah & Duck episodes
- List of The Sarah Jane Adventures serials
- List of Scallywagga episodes
- List of Shaun the Sheep episodes
- List of Sooty & Co. episodes
- List of Sooty Show episodes
- List of The Story Makers episodes
- List of Supercar episodes
- List of Terrahawks episodes
- List of The Story of Tracy Beaker episodes
- List of Thomas & Friends episodes
- List of Thunderbirds Are Go episodes
- List of Thunderbirds episodes
- List of The Tomorrow People serials
- List of Topsy and Tim episodes
- List of Tweenies episodes
- List of Wolfblood episodes
- List of The Wombles episodes
- List of The Worst Witch (1998 TV series) episodes
- List of Young Dracula episodes
- List of ZZZap! episodes

== Comedy ==
- List of 8 Out of 10 Cats Does Countdown episodes
- List of 8 Out of 10 Cats episodes
- List of Absolutely episodes
- List of Al Murray's Happy Hour episodes
- List of Alan Carr: Chatty Man episodes
- List of Da Ali G Show episodes
- List of Argumental episodes
- List of Balls of Steel episodes
- List of The Basil Brush Show episodes
- List of Bear Behaving Badly episodes
- List of A Bit of Fry & Laurie episodes
- List of Bo' Selecta! episodes
- List of The Catherine Tate Show episodes
- List of Celebrity Juice episodes
- List of Charlie Brooker's Screenwipe episodes
- List of The Comic Strip Presents... episodes
- List of Dave's One Night Stand episodes
- List of Dead Ringers episodes
- List of Fake Reaction episodes
- List of Fonejacker episodes
- List of French and Saunders episodes
- List of Fresh Meat episodes
- List of The Goodies episodes
- List of The Graham Norton Show episodes
- List of Hank Zipzer episodes
- List of Have I Got News for You episodes
- List of An Idiot Abroad episodes
- List of Insert Name Here episodes
- List of The Jonathan Ross Show episodes
- List of The Kenny Everett Video Show episodes
- List of The Last Leg episodes
- List of A League of Their Own episodes
- List of Map Men episodes
- List of Little Britain episodes
- List of Michael McIntyre's Big Show episodes
- List of Mock the Week episodes
- List of Morecambe and Wise joint appearances
- List of The Morecambe & Wise Show (1968 TV series) episodes
- List of The Morecambe & Wise Show (1978 TV series) episodes
- List of Never Mind the Buzzcocks episodes
- List of Off Their Rockers episodes
- List of Peppa Pig episodes
- List of Play to the Whistle episodes
- List of Pocoyo episodes
- List of QI episodes
- List of The Ricky Gervais Show (TV series) episodes
- List of Ripping Yarns episodes
- List of Rock Profile episodes
- List of Room 101 episodes
- List of Russell Howard & Mum: Road Trip episodes
- List of Saturday Live (British TV series) episodes
- List of Shooting Stars episodes
- List of Taskmaster episodes
- List of They Think It's All Over episodes
- List of The Thick of It episodes
- List of Tracey Ullman's Show episodes
- List of Two of a Kind episodes
- List of Victoria Wood: As Seen on TV episodes
- List of Whose Line Is It Anyway? (British TV series) episodes
- List of Would I Lie to You? episodes
- List of You Have Been Watching episodes

=== Comedy drama ===
- List of All Creatures Great and Small (1978 TV series) episodes
- List of Auf Wiedersehen, Pet episodes
- List of Being Human (British TV series) episodes
- List of Cold Feet episodes
- List of Doc Martin episodes
- List of Heartstopper episodes
- List of Jonathan Creek episodes
- List of Lovejoy episodes
- List of Minder episodes
- List of Misfits episodes
- List of My Mad Fat Diary episodes
- List of Press Gang episodes
- List of Shameless (British TV series) episodes
- List of Shine on Harvey Moon episodes
- List of Stella (British TV series) episodes
- List of Teachers (British TV series) episodes

== Crime ==
- List of Agatha Christie's Marple episodes
- List of Agatha Christie's Poirot episodes
- List of Ashes to Ashes episodes
- List of The Avengers (TV series) episodes
- List of The Avengers (radio series) episodes
- List of Bergerac episodes
- List of The Bill episodes
- List of Cracker episodes
- List of Dalziel and Pascoe episodes
- List of DCI Banks episodes
- List of Death in Paradise episodes
- List of Dempsey and Makepeace episodes
- List of Endeavour episodes
- List of The Gentle Touch episodes
- List of Happy Valley episodes
- List of Hustle episodes
- List of Inspector George Gently episodes
- List of Inspector Morse episodes
- List of Law & Order: UK episodes
- List of Lewis episodes
- List of Life on Mars (British TV series) episodes
- List of Lovejoy episodes
- List of Midsomer Murders episodes
- List of New Tricks episodes
- List of Peaky Blinders episodes
- List of Prime Suspect (British TV series) episodes
- List of The Professionals episodes
- List of Ripper Street episodes
- List of Scott & Bailey episodes
- List of Sherlock Holmes episodes
- List of Taggart episodes
- List of A Touch of Frost episodes
- List of The Tunnel episodes
- List of Z-Cars episodes

=== Crime drama ===
- List of Broadchurch episodes
- List of Father Brown episodes
- List of HolbyBlue episodes
- List of Jonathan Creek episodes
- List of Line of Duty episodes
- List of Rogue (TV series) episodes
- List of Prime Suspect (British TV series) episodes
- List of Sherlock episodes
- List of Silent Witness episodes
- List of Waking the Dead episodes

== Drama ==
- List of Ackley Bridge episodes
- List of Armchair Theatre episodes
- List of At Home with the Braithwaites episodes
- List of Bad Girls episodes
- List of Black Mirror episodes
- List of Boon episodes
- List of Callan episodes
- List of Casualty episodes (series 1–20)
- List of Casualty episodes (series 21–34)
- List of Casualty episodes (series 35–present)
- List of Cracker episodes
- List of The Crown episodes
- List of The Cut episodes
- List of Dalziel and Pascoe episodes
- List of DCI Banks episodes
- List of Death in Paradise episodes
- List of Dixon of Dock Green episodes
- List of Doctor Who Christmas and New Year's specials
- List of Dr. Finlay's Casebook episodes
- List of Endeavour episodes
- List of The Fall episodes
- List of Footballers' Wives episodes
- List of Happy Valley episodes
- List of Holby City episodes (series 13–23)
- List of Hollyoaks Later episodes
- List of Humans episodes
- List of Inspector George Gently episodes
- List of Inspector Morse episodes
- List of Judge John Deed episodes
- List of Kingdom (British TV series) episodes
- List of The Last Kingdom episodes
- List of Last Tango in Halifax episodes
- List of Law & Order: UK episodes
- List of Lewis episodes
- List of London's Burning episodes
- List of Mad Dogs episodes
- List of The Main Chance episodes
- List of Merlin episodes
- List of Mile High episodes
- List of Monarch of the Glen episodes
- List of Moving On episodes
- List of New Tricks episodes
- List of Our Girl episodes
- List of Out of the Unknown episodes
- List of Outlander episodes
- List of Penny Dreadful episodes
- List of Poldark episodes
- List of Richard the Lionheart episodes
- List of Rome (TV series) episodes
- List of Scott & Bailey episodes
- List of Secret Diary of a Call Girl episodes
- List of Tales of the Unexpected episodes
- List of This Life episodes
- List of A Touch of Frost episodes
- List of The Tudors episodes
- List of The Tunnel episodes
- List of Utopia episodes
- List of Vera episodes
- List of Waterloo Road episodes
- List of Where the Heart Is episodes
- List of Wild at Heart episodes

=== Period drama ===
- List of The Adventures of Robin Hood episodes
- List of All Creatures Great and Small (1978 TV series) episodes
- List of Born and Bred episodes
- List of Call the Midwife episodes
- List of Downton Abbey episodes
- List of Heartbeat episodes
- List of I, Claudius episodes
- List of The Musketeers episodes
- List of Onedin Line episodes
- List of Ripper Street episodes
- List of Robin Hood (2006 TV series) episodes
- List of The Royal episodes
- List of Secret Army episodes
- List of Sherlock Holmes episodes
- List of Shine on Harvey Moon episodes
- List of Upstairs, Downstairs episodes

== Non-fiction ==
- List of 8 Out of 10 Cats Does Countdown episodes
- List of 8 Out of 10 Cats episodes
- List of After Dark editions
- List of Al Murray's Happy Hour episodes
- List of Alan Carr: Chatty Man episodes
- List of Ant & Dec's Saturday Night Takeaway episodes
- List of Antiques Roadshow episodes
- List of Argumental episodes
- List of Autopsy: The Last Hours of... episodes
- List of Balls of Steel episodes
- List of Beat the Star episodes
- List of The Big Reunion episodes
- List of Britain's Got Talent episodes
- List of Britannia documentaries
- List of Celebrity Mastermind episodes
- List of Challenge Anneka episodes
- List of Charlie Brooker's Screenwipe episodes
- List of Chartjackers episodes
- List of Consolevania episodes
- List of Dave's One Night Stand episodes
- List of David Attenborough's Natural Curiosities episodes
- List of Deadly 60 episodes
- List of Dispatches episodes
- List of DIY SOS episodes
- List of Educating episodes
- List of Equinox episodes
- List of Fake Reaction episodes
- List of The Family (2008 TV series) episodes
- List of Fifth Gear episodes
- List of Four Rooms episodes
- List of Friday Download episodes
- List of Friday Night with Jonathan Ross episodes
- List of Gogglebox episodes
- List of Grand Designs episodes
- List of The Grand Tour episodes
- List of Have I Got News for You episodes
- List of Horizon (British TV series) episodes
- List of The Hotel Inspector episodes
- List of An Idiot Abroad episodes
- List of Insert Name Here episodes
- List of The Kenny Everett Video Show episodes
- List of The Last Leg episodes
- List of Later... with Jools Holland episodes
- List of A League of Their Own episodes
- List of The Master Game episodes
- List of Meerkat Manor episodes
- List of Mock the Week episodes
- List of Most Haunted episodes
- List of Natural World episodes
- List of Never Mind the Buzzcocks episodes
- List of OK! TV episodes
- List of One Born Every Minute episodes
- List of Play to the Whistle episodes
- List of Police Camera Action! episodes
- List of QI episodes
- List of Question Time episodes
- List of The Real Hustle episodes
- List of Russell Howard & Mum: Road Trip episodes
- List of The Secret Millionaire episodes
- List of Shooting Stars episodes
- List of Stars in Their Eyes episodes
- List of Supernanny episodes
- List of Talking Pictures episodes
- List of Tattoo Fixers episodes
- List of They Think It's All Over episodes
- List of Time Team episodes
- List of Top Gear (1977 TV series) episodes
- List of Top Gear (2002 TV series) episodes
- List of The Valleys episodes
- List of VideoGaiden episodes
- List of Virgin 1 Presents.... episodes
- List of Wheeler Dealers episodes
- List of Who Do You Think You Are? episodes
- List of Wildlife on One episodes
- List of Would I Lie to You? episodes
- List of You Have Been Watching episodes

== Radio ==
- List of Dad's Army radio episodes
- List of Dead Ringers episodes
- List of Desert Island Discs episodes
- List of Desert Island Discs episodes (1942–1946)
- List of Desert Island Discs episodes (1951–1960)
- List of Desert Island Discs episodes (1961–1970)
- List of Desert Island Discs episodes (1971–1980)
- List of Desert Island Discs episodes (1981–1990)
- List of Desert Island Discs episodes (1991–2000)
- List of Desert Island Discs episodes (2001–2010)
- List of Desert Island Discs episodes (2011–2020)
- List of Desert Island Discs episodes (2021–present)
- List of The Goon Show episodes
- List of In Our Time programmes
- List of The Men from the Ministry episodes
- List of The Navy Lark episodes
- List of Nebulous episodes
- List of Old Harry's Game episodes
- List of Private Passions episodes (1995–1999)
- List of Private Passions episodes (2000–2004)
- List of Private Passions episodes (2005–2009)
- List of Private Passions episodes (2010–2014)
- List of Private Passions episodes (2015–2019)
- List of Private Passions episodes (2020–present)

== Reality ==
- List of 24 Hours in A&E episodes
- List of Blind Date (British game show) episodes
- List of Celebrity Ex on the Beach episodes
- List of Ex on the Beach episodes
- List of Faking It (British TV series) episodes
- List of Geordie Shore episodes
- List of Impractical Jokers UK episodes
- List of It's All About Amy episodes
- List of Wife Swap (British TV series) episodes
- List of Made in Chelsea episodes
- List of The Only Way Is Essex episodes
- List of The Real Housewives of Cheshire episodes
- List of RuPaul's Drag Race UK episodes
- List of Undercover Boss (British TV series) episodes
- List of La Venganza de los Ex VIP episodes
- List of The X Factor (British TV series) episodes

== Science fiction ==
- List of Ashes to Ashes episodes
- List of Black Mirror episodes
- List of Blake's 7 episodes
- List of Captain Scarlet and the Mysterons episodes
- List of Doctor Who Christmas and New Year's specials
- List of Doctor Who episodes (1963–1989)
- List of Doctor Who episodes (2005–2025)
- List of Eve (British TV series) episodes
- List of Goodnight Sweetheart episodes
- List of Humans episodes
- List of Jeopardy episodes
- List of Joe 90 episodes
- List of Life on Mars (British TV series) episodes
- List of Misfits episodes
- List of The Omega Factor episodes
- List of Out of the Unknown episodes
- List of Primeval episodes
- List of Red Dwarf episodes
- List of Sapphire & Steel serials
- List of The Sarah Jane Adventures serials
- List of Space: 1999 episodes
- List of Supercar episodes
- List of Terrahawks episodes
- List of Thunderbirds Are Go episodes
- List of Thunderbirds episodes
- List of The Tomorrow People serials
- List of Torchwood episodes

== Sitcoms ==
- List of 2point4 Children episodes
- List of Absolutely Fabulous episodes
- List of After You've Gone episodes
- List of 'Allo 'Allo! episodes
- List of The Amazing World of Gumball episodes
- List of Are You Being Served? episodes
- List of As Time Goes By episodes
- List of Bad Education episodes
- List of Benidorm episodes
- List of Birds of a Feather episodes
- List of Blackadder episodes
- List of Bless This House episodes
- List of Brassic episodes
- List of Bread episodes
- List of The Brittas Empire episodes
- List of Chalk episodes
- List of Citizen Khan episodes
- List of Citizen Smith episodes
- List of Coupling episodes
- List of Dad's Army episodes
- List of Desmond's episodes
- List of Dinnerladies episodes
- List of Don't Wait Up episodes
- List of Drop the Dead Donkey episodes
- List of Episodes episodes
- List of Extras episodes
- List of The Fall and Rise of Reginald Perrin episodes
- List of Father Ted episodes
- List of The Fenn Street Gang episodes
- List of Friday Night Dinner episodes
- List of Game On episodes
- List of Gavin & Stacey episodes
- List of Genie in the House episodes
- List of George and Mildred episodes
- List of Gimme Gimme Gimme episodes
- List of Give My Head Peace episodes
- List of The Good Life episodes
- List of Goodnight Sweetheart episodes
- List of The Green Green Grass episodes
- List of Hi-de-Hi! episodes
- List of High Hopes episodes
- List of How Not to Live Your Life episodes
- List of The Inbetweeners episodes
- List of It Ain't Half Hot Mum episodes
- List of The IT Crowd episodes
- List of Jeeves and Wooster episodes
- List of Joking Apart episodes
- List of Josh episodes
- List of Keeping Up Appearances episodes
- List of Last of the Summer Wine episodes
- List of Lead Balloon episodes
- List of Love Thy Neighbour (1972 TV series) episodes
- List of Maid Marian and Her Merry Men episodes
- List of Man About the House episodes
- List of Men Behaving Badly episodes
- List of Mind Your Language episodes
- List of Miranda episodes
- List of Mongrels episodes
- List of Monty Python's Flying Circus episodes
- List of Mount Pleasant episodes
- List of Mr. Bean episodes
- List of Mum episodes
- List of My Family episodes
- List of My Hero episodes
- List of Never the Twain episodes
- List of The New Statesman episodes
- List of Not Going Out episodes
- List of The Office (British TV series) episodes
- List of On the Buses episodes
- List of One Foot in the Grave episodes
- List of Only Fools and Horses episodes
- List of Open All Hours episodes
- List of Outnumbered episodes
- List of Peep Show episodes
- List of Porridge episodes
- List of Rab C. Nesbitt episodes
- List of Red Dwarf episodes
- List of Rentaghost episodes
- List of Rising Damp episodes
- List of Robin's Nest episodes
- List of The Royle Family episodes
- List of Steptoe and Son episodes
- List of Still Game episodes
- List of Still Open All Hours episodes
- List of Terry and June episodes
- List of Till Death Us Do Part episodes
- List of To the Manor Born episodes
- List of Trollied episodes
- List of Two Pints of Lager and a Packet of Crisps episodes
- List of The Upper Hand episodes
- List of Upstart Crow episodes
- List of The Vicar of Dibley episodes
- List of Yes Minister and Yes, Prime Minister episodes
- List of You Rang, M'Lord? episodes
- List of The Young Offenders episodes

== Teen ==
- List of The Inbetweeners episodes
- List of My Mad Fat Diary episodes
- List of Press Gang episodes
- List of The Young Offenders episodes
- List of EastEnders: E20 episodes
- List of Grange Hill episodes
- List of Heartstopper episodes
- List of My Mad Fat Diary episodes
- List of Press Gang episodes
- List of Skins episodes
- List of Sugar Rush episodes

== Other genres ==
=== Espionage ===
- List of The Avengers (TV series) episodes
- List of The Avengers (radio series) episodes
- List of Callan episodes
- List of Danger Man episodes
- List of Spooks episodes

=== Fantasy ===
- List of Merlin episodes
- List of Wolfblood episodes

=== ITV ===
- List of Birds of a Feather episodes
- List of Danger Mouse (1981 TV series) episodes
- List of Horrid Henry episodes
- List of My Parents Are Aliens episodes
- List of Rainbow episodes
- List of Thomas & Friends episodes

=== LGBTQ ===
- List of Bad Girls episodes
- List of Balls of Steel episodes
- List of Bo' Selecta! episodes
- List of Gimme Gimme Gimme episodes
- List of Heartstopper episodes
- List of My Family episodes
- List of Peep Show episodes
- List of RuPaul's Drag Race UK episodes
- List of Skins episodes
- List of Sugar Rush episodes

=== Mystery ===
- List of Broadchurch episodes
- List of Jonathan Creek episodes
- List of Sherlock episodes
- List of Silent Witness episodes
- List of Waking the Dead episodes

=== Romance ===
- List of As Time Goes By episodes
- List of Coupling episodes
- List of Goodnight Sweetheart episodes
- List of Heartstopper episodes

=== Miscellaneous ===
- List of Public Eye episodes
- List of Theatre 625 episodes
