= List of Maid Marian and Her Merry Men episodes =

The following is a list of the episodes of the BBC television series Maid Marian and her Merry Men.

== Series 1 (1989) ==
Series One is the most faithful to the original legends being parodied and probably the series with the fewest anachronisms. Originally transmitted from 16 November to 21 December 1989, with How The Band Got Together repeated on 20 April 2001.

No. overall	No. in series	Title	Original release date
1	1	"How The Band Got Together"	16 November 1989
A young villager, Marian, is enraged by the treatment given to her pet tadpole Edwina by the villainous Sheriff of Nottingham and his henchmen. Together with cowardly tailor Robin of Kensington, Rastafarian black marketeer Barrington, congenital moron Rabies and violent dwarf Little Ron, she forms a "ruthless band of freedom fighters". Robin earns his more famous nickname of "Robin Hood" by being told to pull his hood over his head when threatening to set fire to King John's underpants.
2	2	"Robert The Incredible Chicken"	23 November 1989
Marian attempts to teach the gang to shoot longbows, a skill Robin is incapable of learning. Robin's arrow is wide of the target but gives the Sheriff a near-death experience adding to the belief that Robin is a wonderful marksman and the leader of the gang. This results in a plan by the Baddies to stage an archery contest to trap Robin. Unable to resist the boost to his ego, Robin enters, in disguise as a large chicken and giving his name as "Robert, Robert the Incredible Chicken" when asked. Marian saves the day just before Robin's brilliant subterfuge is discovered. Robin's disguise is similar to the one (as a stork) worn by the cartoon fox Robin Hood in the 1973 Disney film. The Baddies still believe that Marian should stay in her kitchen, and that Robin is the leader of the gang.
3	3	"A Game Called John"	30 November 1989
Pancake Day celebrations make King John realise that he is not recognised by the people of Worksop, and he therefore commissions the Sheriff to come up with ways of being remembered. The Sheriff's suggestion is that he invent something – a task promptly delegated to the Sheriff, who comes up with a new game to be called "John". This game suffers teething problems when the large number of balls required to play simply roll off the table, hence the requirement for green cloth. The cloth is stolen by the Merry Men for their uniforms and the Sheriff gives the rights to the game to a local peasant, mistakenly believing the man's name to be "Stinker". The new owner of the game, however, is actually known as "snooker".
4	4	"The Miracle of St Charlene"	7 December 1989
The Merry Men need to build a bridge to cross the river in order to steal from the rich, a task which is not made any easier by Robin's literal adherence to Marian's instructions. Meanwhile, King John's uncle, the Duke of Dagenham, has died, leaving him only a hot water bottle, which the Sheriff is to sell for a grossly inflated price. Of course, the contents of the bottle prove a nice nest egg.
5	5	"The Sharp End of a Cow"	14 December 1989
Robin's popularity with the peasants has driven King John to distraction, resulting in his firing the Sheriff (who promptly goes undercover) and chasing the outlaws himself. Likewise, Robin's early-warning system for the Merry Men's hideout has driven Marian to distraction as well.
6	6	"The Whitish Knight"	21 December 1989
A mysterious white knight is seen around Worksop, who may be King John's brother, returning from the crusades. Meanwhile, the fate of Rip-Off, the giant teddy bear is to be determined. This episode features Forbes Collins in a dual role as King John and his brother Richard.

== Series 2 (1990) ==
Series Two, despite the appearance of Guy of Gisborne (who is almost the opposite of the character of the same name from the legends) begins to veer away from them and instead move towards a more creative style. Originally transmitted from 15 November to 20 December 1990, and repeated from 27 April to 1 June 2001.

No. overall	No. in series	Title	Original release date
7	1	"The Beast of Bolsover"	15 November 1990
A rival gang of outlaws, led by the Australian stereotype the Beast of Bolsover (and his nephew, the Nuisance of Nuneaton) attempt a takeover of Sherwood Forest, much to the disgust of Marian and friends.
8	2	"The Worksop Egg Fairy"	22 November 1990
The "Worksop Egg Fairy" has blessed the highly superstitious peasants with eggs, which is good because King John wants one. The Merry Men are in the position of having to work around village superstition in order to protect the locals.
9	3	"Little Brown Noses"	29 November 1990
In an effort to boost revenue, the Sheriff arrests Gladys' chicken, Colin, for illegal parking. Marian tries to inspire the peasants into raising the fine by staging a charity event which apes Comic Relief's Red Nose Day charity fundraiser. King John, meanwhile, has been saddled with his nephew, the immature Guy of Gisborne, to look after. Richard Curtis, the man behind Comic Relief encouraged the creator and writer of Maid Marian (Tony Robinson) to write.
10	4	"Rabies in Love"	6 December 1990
Marian's fundraising is working well, since nobody can beat Rabies in an arm wrestle. Nobody, that is, except Fergi, with whom Rabies promptly falls in love. The Merry Men attempt to help, but are hampered by the fact that King John's plan for getting Guy off his hands is to marry him off to Fergi, a satirical, tongue-in-cheek reference to Fergie.
11	5	"Rotten Rose - Part 1"	13 December 1990
Marian's old classmate, Rose Scargill, is one of the many Worksop citizens with her eye on Robin (who has not exactly dispelled the belief that he is the brains behind the Merry Men). Rose gets her hands on some of Robin's possessions, and discovers that she could make good money by turning him over to the authorities. Thus, in a series of deceptions, Robin finds himself in King John's dungeon believing Marian to be a traitor.
12	6	"Rotten Rose - Part 2"	20 December 1990
Despite the notable handicap of their own stupidity in the absence of the jailed Robin (who is not particularly intelligent anyway) and Marian, who has also been jailed, the Merry Men devise a plan to free both and save the day. It certainly is not Barrington's suggestion that they break into the castle, find Marian, ask her how to break into the castle and save everyone.

== Series 3 (1993) ==
By the third series, the surrealism and anachronisms were well-entrenched and the plots had very little to do with the historical setting. More overt parodies and references can be seen here, including the song in Episode 3 "Call The Dentist" (a direct parody of the Ghostbusters theme), "Chop Suey" in Episode 5 (a slow parody of Elvis Presley's "In the Ghetto") and almost all of Episode 5. The supposed conflict between King John and the Sheriff on the one side and the Merry Men on the other is often downplayed in favour of a general comedic situation. Originally transmitted from 7 January to 11 February 1993, and repeated from 8 June to 13 July 2001.

No. overall	No. in series	Title	Original release date
13	1	"The Big Baby"	7 January 1993
Barrington develops his line in impressions, leading to concern among some of the Merry Men that he might actually have swallowed other people. King John, meanwhile, decrees that his subjects should give him presents, resulting in the appearance of a life-size jelly baby looking vaguely like him. The jelly baby is captured, leaving the Sheriff to devise the new holiday of "Bloopy" to justify the need for presents. The Merry Men, meanwhile, put Barrington's talents to use.
14	2	"Driving Ambition"	14 January 1993
In order to cheer up the locals of Worksop, Marian establishes a Eurovision-like singing competition, which Rose promptly hijacks. The Sheriff, too, has a vested interest in the money – which he needs to pay off King John's driving instructor. Since Guy has entered and has bet against himself, some crooked judges are required to make sure the money goes in the right direction. Barrington, being quite a good singer, wants to enter himself and Marian singing a duet, so they need bent judges too. Both the Sheriff and the Merry Men are bound to clash.
15	3	"Keeping Mum"	21 January 1993
Marian's mother, labouring under the misapprehension that her daughter is a dental receptionist, comes to visit. The Merry Men are only too happy to join in the charade of being dentists. The Sheriff, meanwhile, views the new arrival as the perfect bait to trap and arrest Marian.
16	4	"They Came From Outer Space"	28 January 1993
A mysterious fireball is seen over Worksop and Guy begins to talk about his invisible alien friend, Plop-Bop. The peasants and the Merry Men are also thinking about life on other planets, while King John is concerned about the defence implications, which means that the Sheriff has to raise more money from the peasants to defend against invasion by space carriage. The only things the peasants have left to lose are the clothes on their backs, which are promptly taken, causing Marian to harness the alien mania herself.
17	5	"Robin and the Beansprout"	4 February 1993
Robin's excuses, bearing remarkable resemblances to last night's bedtime story, have driven Marian to distraction. In his quest to find dinner, Robin only finds a beansprout, but a series of events uncannily like Jack and the Beanstalk transpire to have him return triumphantly with takeaway Chinese food.
18	6	"The Great Mud Harvest"	11 February 1993
The peasants of Worksop are broke; there is simply no more money to tax. With the job done, the Sheriff sacks Gary, before being threatened with the sack himself by King John unless he can find another source of wealth in Worksop. Marian attempts famine relief, which does no good with the fatalistic peasants, until Robin appears in his new white suit, which he keeps singing about. Marian bets him that he cannot keep it clean "until the end of this episode". Little does she know exactly what Worksop is sitting on top of.

== Christmas Special (1993) ==
Originally transmitted as one 50 minute episode on 24 December 1993, and repeated as two 25 minute episodes on 20 July and 27 July 2001. This episode can be found as an extra on the series 3 DVD release.

No. overall	No. in series	Title	Original release date
19	1	"Maid Marian and Much the Mini Mart Manager's Son"	24 December 1993
After his tap-dancing lesson with Barrington, Robin foolishly reveals his identity to the Sheriff, but Much (the Mini Mart Manager's son) has a word and persuades the Sheriff to disperse his guards. Marian is further unimpressed at Much's manipulation of the peasants fear of "the Giant Toad Monster of Stoke-on-Trent" to sell tacky toys. When Guy threatens to leave, King John promises to catch Robin and his gang for him if they could only strengthen their forces.

== Series 4 (1994) ==
This, the final series of the programme, is in many ways the most bizarre. On the one hand, the comedy became more sophisticated: the roleplaying references in Episode 1, the parodies of English seaside culture in Episode 3 and the Beatles references in Episode 4 are jokes aimed over the heads of a juvenile audience. The appearance of "Clem Costner" is a reference to the Robin Hood films – and the fact that the Costner character is Robin's antithesis is perhaps unsurprising – while the inversion of the entire culture in the final episode demonstrates that nothing is sacred. On the other hand, the comedy also became more juvenile, and there was more slapstick and pie gags than in the other three series combined. Originally transmitted from 5 January to 16 February 1994, with five of the seven episodes repeated (The Wise Woman of Worksop and Voyage to the Bottom of the Forest were not included) from 3 to 31 August 2001.

No. overall	No. in series	Title	Original release date
20	1	"Tunnel Vision"	5 January 1994
The Sheriff and King John have cooked up a scheme to build a tunnel to Scunthorpe. Meanwhile, Sherwood Forest is in the midst of a gaming craze – with the Merry Men playing "Chronic the Hedgehog" and "Dungeons & Dragons". Rose kidnaps Guy just as his mother appears, and Gary and Graeme wade through a parody of The Crystal Maze with Richard O'Brien stand-in "Robin O'Hood", which leads to the Sheriff losing track of reality and fantasy when presented with the Used Tissue of Invisibility. Note: This is the only episode to be co-written by Mark Billingham and David Lloyd alongside Tony Robinson.
21	2	"Bouncy Sheriff"	12 January 1994
King John wants Guy's toys out of the castle, or else he will turn the Sheriff into a Bouncy Sheriff for his nephew's enjoyment. Marian, meanwhile, quits the gang over their sexist attitudes and starts selling home improvements with Rose. Rose conspires with the Sheriff to deliver Marian, the Merry Men and a brand new flat-pack extension on the back of Nottingham Castle to King John.
22	3	"Raining Forks"	19 January 1994
A cold virus (or The Plague) is sweeping through Worksop. Even King John catches it and decides he needs a break by the sea. The Sheriff rounds up the peasants and gets them to build a seaside holiday camp. As luck would have it, the Merry Men are on holiday not far from the new camp and devote their energies to infiltrating it and stopping the forced labour so that everyone can celebrate High Forks Night.
23	4	"The Wise Woman of Worksop"	26 January 1994
The Merry Men are suffering from insomnia and Robin is keeping everyone else up with his all-night raves. Only wise old Gladys knows what to do, mixing up some of her Sleepy Cake. Things go wrong, leaving the Merry Men looking like the Beatles, and the gang have to free Gladys's father, who has been locked in King John's dungeon. Rabies, of all people, devises a plan to resolve this situation, featuring an appearance of "Pixie Paul and his little wife Linda" and it actually works. This episode was not repeated in 2001 due to the death of Linda McCartney since the original transmission.
24	5	"Robin the Bad"	2 February 1994
Clem Costner, who looks exactly like Robin, is wreaking havoc in Worksop, even (apparently) killing King John. The peasants, dismayed at this change in Robin's character, transfer their affections to the Sheriff. It is all down to Barrington, Rabies and Little Ron to prove Robin's innocence.
25	6	"The Nice Sumatran"	9 February 1994
Marian attempts to scare off King John, who is actually scared off, surrendering his crown to Guy. He takes refuge with the Merry Men, who reluctantly decide to follow the example of the Nice Sumatran towards unfortunate rich people and agree to let him stay. However, relations with the new guest deteriorate and Marian realises she has to scare Guy into surrendering the crown to King John again, which requires an unlikely alliance with the Sheriff.
26	7	"Voyage to the Bottom of the Forest"	16 February 1994
Rabies is lazy, so much so that many of the Merry Men's plans simply do not work because of him. However, the robbery of a battleship and its subsequent launch take the Merry Men to the parallel universe of Engyland, where Rabies' arrival has been eagerly awaited by the good people of Workflop, particularly the Nottyman, to save them from the wicked witch.
