= List of Dixi episodes =

Dixi was originally released on the CBBC website in 2014, then later turned into televised episodes lasting 10–15 minutes each. So far it has had 4 series as being originally confirmed to have a fourth series in late 2016. The latest series aired on the CBBC Website in late 2017.

== Series 1 (Online Episodes) ==
Dixi 1 launched on the CBBC website on 24 February 2014.

Number	Episode	Basic Plot
1	Murder She Vlogged	Shari finds out that someone has hacked her Dixi account and that they have posted a horrible picture of her.
2	Prime Suspect	Shari launches her new Dixi page: The Dixi Murder and comes up with her first suspect.
3	Nemesis	Murdo helps Shari come up with a plan to catch Chloe.
4	If You Come At The Queen...	A massive revelation rules Chloe out of being a suspect.
5	The Wrath Of Chloe	Shari gets a new lead when Mimi sends her an urgent message.
6	Me Too Mimi	Mimi lies about finding a clue on her Dixi page but she leads Eve & Shari to an even bigger lead.
7	Shari's Next Move	Shari comes up with a plan to see if Zane hacked her.
8	Undercover Isla	Isla goes undercover which backfires dramatically and another person gets hacked.
9	The Loneliest Bus Ride In The World	No-one is speaking to Shari any more and her brother, Syd, warns her about something.
10	The Game's Afoot	Someone hacks Syd's game and Shari finds a new clue.
11	Dial M For Murdo	Shari messages Murdo to help her with the investigation.
12	Diagnosis Murdo	Shari and Eve find out who hacked Syd's game whilst talking to Murdo.
13	Troll Hunter	Shari and Eve get into trouble when Shari sends Murdo an 'abusive' post.
14	When A Bestie Calls	Things get serious when the gang see The Dixi Kiler's next attack.
15	The Curious Incident Of The Dog In The Daytime	Shari, Eve and Isla take down the horrible posters and Shari gets a message from the Vamps!
16	No-One Goes To Chess Club	Shari is back on the case and someone confesses to being the Dixi Killer!
17	Good Cop, Bad Cop, Weird Cop	The gang find out that Mimi was lying again about being the Dixi Killer and find a shocking clue.
18	A New Suspect, Lollllllllll!	Eve and Shari continue on the case and Shari needs help from Chloe. Chloe?!
19	An Unholy Alliance	Shari, Eve and Chloe break into Miss J's computer account.
20	CSI: Dixi	The gang get help from Zane to look through CCTV footage, with a shocking discovery.
21	Use You Brain...	Shari thinks that Zane is the Killer when he says that the CCTV footage has been wiped.
22	The Killer's Prints	Shari follows Zane into a print shop, where she finds one of the horrible posters. Is this proof that Zane is the Killer?!
23	Showdown	Shari gets a message telling her to back off, then confronts Zane with awful consequences.
24	A Message For The Killer	Shari leaves a message for the Killer, rounds her suspects down to everyone on the Prom Committee and someone sends her a link which promises to help the case but does the complete opposite.
25	Tech Ops	Eve try's to fix Shari's computer and Shari gets into the all-important tech rehearsal.
26	Shadow Of A Doubt	Shari goes to the tech rehearsal and finds out something shocking.
27	A New Low	Shari is upset that her best friend has lied to her and doesn't know whom to trust anymore.
28	Prom Night	A massive revelation blows the case wide open and Shari rushes to the Prom.
29	A Murderer Is Announced - PT1	Shari calls for an emergency meeting at the Prom.
30	A Murderer Is Announced - PT2	The Killer is revealed but will it be a happy ending?

== Series 2 (Online Episodes) ==
On September 29, 2014, Dixi 2 was announced. Like series 1, it consists of 30 episodes.

Number	Episode	Basic Plot
1	It All Started With A Curse	Mimi gets sent a creepy curse but who should she forward it to?
2	Isla Starts Counting	Murdo dumps Eve 5 minutes after she deleted the curse. Isla is sure that the curse IS real.
3	Friend Request	Mimi gets sent a friend request from 'Alice' and sets up a trap.
4	Supernatural Showdown	Mimi is sure that 'Alice' is really Kat, but how can she prove it?
5	Gothbuster	Mimi goes undercover to interrogate Kat but it backfires.
6	A Picture Is Worth A Thousand Screams	Isla finds an old photo with Alice in!
7	Ghoul Trip	The gang get a Fieldtrip Orientation but things get freaky when Alice appears!
8	Paranormal Hacktivity	Mimi has a new prime suspect: Lewis and Isla's computer is cursed.
9	Silence Of The RAM	Isla's computer curse is rationally explained and Grace falls down the stairs just after Chloe says that Alice isn't real.
10	Field Trip Friday	-
