= List of La Venganza de los Ex VIP episodes =

The following is a list of episodes for the a Mexican reality television series La Venganza de los Ex VIP that first aired on MTV on November 21, 2021.

== Series overview ==
Season	Episodes	Originally released	
Season	Episodes	First released	Last released
1	12	November 9, 2021	December 16, 2021
2	12	January 26, 2023	April 4, 2023
3	12	December 5, 2023	February 20, 2024
4	13	March 18, 2025	June 3, 2025
5	13	February 10, 2026	April 28, 2026

=== Season 1 (2021) ===
No. overall	No. in season	Title	Original release date
1	1	"Episode 1"	9 November 2021
2	2	"Episode 2"	11 November 2021
3	3	"Episode 3"	16 November 2021
4	4	"Episode 4"	18 November 2021
5	5	"Episode 5"	23 November 2021
6	6	"Episode 6"	26 November 2021
7	7	"Episode 7"	30 November 2021
8	8	"Episode 8"	2 December 2021
9	9	"Episode 9"	7 December 2021
10	10	"Episode 10"	9 December 2021
11	11	"Episode 11"	14 December 2021
12	12	"Episode 12"	16 December 2021

=== Season 2 (2023) ===
No. overall	No. in season	Title	Original release date
13	1	"Episode 1"	24 January 2023
14	2	"Episode 2"	24 January 2023
15	3	"Episode 3"	31 January 2023
16	4	"Episode 4"	7 February 2023
17	5	"Episode 5"	14 February 2023
18	6	"Episode 6"	21 February 2023
19	7	"Episode 7"	28 February 2023
20	8	"Episode 8"	7 March 2023
21	9	"Episode 9"	14 March 2023
22	10	"Episode 10"	21 March 2023
23	11	"Episode 11"	28 March 2023
24	12	"Episode 12"	4 April 2023

=== Season 3 (2023) ===
No. overall	No. in season	Title	Original release date
25	1	"Episode 1"	5 December 2023
26	2	"Episode 2"	12 December 2023
27	3	"Episode 3"	19 December 2023
28	4	"Episode 4"	26 December 2023
29	5	"Episode 5"	2 January 2024
30	6	"Episode 6"	9 January 2024
31	7	"Episode 7"	16 January 2024
32	8	"Episode 8"	23 January 2024
33	9	"Episode 9"	30 January 2024
34	10	"Episode 10"	6 February 2024
35	11	"Episode 11"	13 February 2024
36	12	"Episode 12"	20 February 2024

=== Season 4 (2025) ===
No. overall	No. in season	Title	Original release date
37	1	"Episode 1"	18 March 2025
38	2	"Episode 2"	18 March 2025
39	3	"Episode 3"	25 March 2025
40	4	"Episode 4"	1 April 2025
41	5	"Episode 5"	8 April 2025
42	6	"Episode 6"	15 April 2025
43	7	"Episode 7"	22 April 2025
44	8	"Episode 8"	29 April 2025
45	9	"Episode 9"	6 May 2025
46	10	"Episode 10"	13 May 2025
47	11	"Episode 11"	20 May 2025
48	12	"Episode 12"	27 May 2025
49	13	"Episode 13"	3 June 2025

=== Season 5 (2026) ===
No. overall	No. in season	Title	Original release date
50	1	"Episode 1"	10 February 2026
51	2	"Episode 2"	10 February 2026
52	3	"Episode 3"	17 February 2026
53	4	"Episode 4"	24 February 2026
54	5	"Episode 5"	3 March 2026
55	6	"Episode 6"	10 March 2026
56	7	"Episode 7"	17 March 2026
57	8	"Episode 8"	24 March 2026
58	9	"Episode 9"	31 March 2026
59	10	"Episode 10"	7 April 2026
60	11	"Episode 11"	14 April 2026
61	12	"Episode 12"	21 April 2026
62	13	"Episode 13"	28 April 2026
