= List of The Cut episodes =

The following is a list of episodes of the British BBC television drama, The Cut. The third and final series concluded in December 2010, bringing the total number of episodes to 40 as 25-minute episodes, also released 200 as 5-minute episodes. The BBC later confirmed that The Cut would not return for a fourth series.

== Summary ==
Series	Episodes	Originally aired			
Series	Episodes	Series premiere		Series finale	
Series	Episodes	Online – BBC Switch	Television – BBC Two	Online – BBC Switch	Television – BBC Two
1	15 (75 in 5 mins episodes)	14 September 2009	19 September 2009	18 December 2009	19 December 2009
2	13 (65 in 5 mins episodes)	19 April 2010	24 April 2010	13 August 2010	14 August 2010
3	12 (60 in 5 mins episodes)	27 September 2010	2 October 2010	17 December 2010	18 December 2010
Total Number of Episodes	40 (200 in 5 mins episodes)	14 September 2009	19 September 2009	17 December 2010	18 December 2010

== Episodes ==
The following is a list of episodes for the British BBC television drama, The Cut.

=== Series 1 (Sept – Dec 2009) ===
The 15-part first series was commissioned by the BBC in 2009 and began airing on 19 September 2009 and concluded on 19 December 2009 with the last two episodes shown together as a double bill. Each episode is 25 minutes long but is split up into daily five-minute chunks online throughout the week before the official broadcast. The series was repeated almost immediately after it had ended.

The series started by introducing six main characters – Jay, Marla, Olive, Stephen, Mack and Toni. Fin and Rosa also appeared in the first episode, but initially played a recurring role and did not become regular characters until later in the series. Another character, Tommy, is introduced in Episode 9. Marla's mother Amy makes a guest appearance in Episode 11, before joining the cast as a regular in Episode 14. At the end of the series, Jay and Fin are written out.

#	Episode	Episode Title	Original airdate
1	Episode One	Jay	14 September 2009
1	A stranger's death shines new light on Jay's mysterious past and he's presented the opportunity to escape and discover a new life. His best mate Fin says he should stay; she thinks he's got problems at home to fix before finding a load of new ones somewhere else. But will the promise of adventure be too much for Jay to resist?		
1	Episode Two	Marla	15 September 2009
1	Marla comes home to find her house turned upside down and her mum missing. When her dad, Mack, returns, there's blood on his cheek. What's happened? As always, Mack turns on the charm and convinces her all is well. Her mum's run away before, he's sure she’ll come back when she's cooled down. Will Marla buy it again? What's Mack done?		
1	Episode Three	Olive	16 September 2009
1	Olive's bored stiff working for her sister, Toni, in the Loxley's Café and is desperate for her boyfriend to come back from boarding school so she can give him his birthday present. But what is this present? And who is her boyfriend? Only time will tell...		
1	Episode Four	Stephen	17 September 2009
1	Stephen hates the posh boarding school Mack's had him locked up in. Though he's naturally a straight 'A' student, can money really buy a bright future? Today's his 18th birthday, and as a gift, the school bully's picking on him extra hard. Will Stephen manage to keep his head down, or lash out and book a one-way ticket home...?		
1	Episode Five	Worlds Collide	18 September 2009
1	It's the night of Stephen's 18th birthday, and Marla's planning a big party. With Olive and Toni sorting the catering, it's up to Mack to toast his son's health. Unfortunately on his way to the party, Mack's attacked in a dark-alley. As his family wait for him unawares, Mack's life is saved by a mysterious stranger...but who?		
2	Episode Six	Happy Birthday Stephen	21 September 2009
2	Oblivious of his father's brutal attack, Stephen and Olive share a romantic moment as she finally gives him a very unexpected birthday present: but is it good unexpected or bad? Meanwhile, Marla, Jay and Toni race Mack to the hospital. Will he be okay? And will Marla ever get through to her big brother??		
2	Episode Seven	I Was Born Here	22 September 2009
2	Emotions are running high after the shock of Mack's attack and, with no one else there for her, Marla and Jay are bought close together. But Jay has a decision to make: will he stick around for a while longer? And when Stephen finally shows up demanding to know the truth about his mum, what will Marla tell him?		
2	Episode Eight	I Found Dad's Wallet	23 September 2009
2	Jay heads off the lawyers only to discover some very shocking news... news that could change the lives of everyone on The Cut. In the meantime, Marla and Stephen take Mack's case into their own hands and decide to do some investigating... is Jay really as trustworthy as they first thought?		
2	Episode Nine	Who's Got Your Jacket?	24 September 2009
2	Accusations are flying left, right and centre in The Cut, with Stephen demanding to know whose fault it is their mum's gone. And as for Jay: is he really a thief? What's the real reason he's not planning on going back home in a hurry? Then there's this creepy hooded guy Olive sees in her video of the mews... who is he?		
2	Episode Ten	I Made A Mistake About You...	25 September 2009
2	The spectre of the hooded man plus Olive's disappearance brings Jay, Marla and Toni together as they frantically search the streets for any sign of her. Marla has a brainwave, but will she save the day and find Olive? And will Jay forgive her for jumping to conclusions about him? Only time will tell...		
3	Episode Eleven	He's Not Going To Call...	28 September 2009
3	Olive's little white lies to Toni are starting to darken around the edges. Marla sees Mack holding hands with a mystery woman. Then, there's a knock at the door... Guess who's coming to breakfast?		
3	Episode Twelve	I Lost My Ticket	29 September 2009
3	Jay's back and though Mack's glad to see his hero, Marla's not sure. Still, looks like he could be sticking around: leaving's not easy when the door won't open...		
3	Episode Thirteen	If You Want Something You've Got To Work At It	30 September 2009
3	Stephen's desperate for news about his mum, but gets unwanted relationship advice instead.		
3	Episode Fourteen	Trains Leave Every Hour	1 October 2009
3	Toni nearly uncovers Olive and Stephen's secret, but no such joy for Marla and Jay who are still trapped. Will they ever escape, and can Jay get Marla to open up before they do?		
3	Episode Fifteen	Stop Hiding Your Head In The Sand...	2 October 2009
3	Marla's in full family mode, trying to fix her family with food. Meanwhile, Jay gets his first good look inside the cafe, or should that be HIS cafe...		
4	Episode Sixteen	No More Secrets...	5 October 2009
4	Mack comes clean about Tina, but can Marla believe him? Meanwhile, Jay makes Olive confront some unpleasant memories over a coffee.		
4	Episode Seventeen	Have You Seen Stephen?	6 October 2009
4	Uh oh – Marla's on the warpath and Stephen's in her sights. Of course, when you're planning to run away to Paris with your secret girlfriend FOREVER, an annoyed sister is the last thing on your mind.		
4	Episode Eighteen	You Always Say You Want An Adventure...	7 October 2009
4	There's no personality 'Clash' between Toni and Jay – quite the opposite, in fact. While their relationship blossoms, back at the Mackinnon's Marla's scheming is beginning to pay off, much to Stephen's distress.		
4	Episode Nineteen	Bon Voyage...	8 October 2009
4	The secrecy and lies are all getting too much for Stephen – will he crack, or will Olive be able to find a solution? It's lucky Jay's there to pick up the slack in the cafe.		
4	Episode Twenty	I'm Stephen's Girlfriend...	9 October 2009
4	Olive finally comes clean to Toni (who, predictably, freaks out). Things go no better for Stephen who has to contend with an unwanted blind date and Mack's own brand of (very creepy) fatherly advice.		
5	Episode Twenty One	You're Fifteen Olive!	12 October 2009
5	Olive and Stephen may have missed the train but they're not going to avoid facing the music. Mack doesn't miss a chance to use events to stir things up with Toni.		
5	Episode Twenty Two	Age Gaps Can Work...	13 October 2009
5	Olive and Stephen may have missed the train but they're not going to avoid facing the music. Mack doesn't miss a chance to use events to stir things up with Toni.		
5	Episode Twenty Three	I've Found Someone Else	14 October 2009
5	Olive explains why she really chose Paris and then amazes Marla with news about developments in her love life.		
5	Episode Twenty Four	I Do Really Like Olive...	15 October 2009
5	Stephen and Jay do some male bonding. Olive and Toni have a long overdue chat and Marla gives Stephen some unwanted news.		
5	Episode Twenty Five	This Is How You Get Your Revenge?	16 October 2009
5	Stephen rushes into the cafe to confront Olive about his replacement. Toni and Marla can't calm him down. And why are they as angry as Stephen when Olive reveals all?		
6	Episode Twenty Six	Is It True?	19 October 2009
6	Jay's not sure if he can accept Olive's apology. Toni makes a big decision about the cafe.		
6	Episode Twenty Seven	Jay! Phone An Ambulance	20 October 2009
6	Marla wants to hear the truth from Jay. Toni puts up an advert for help in the café but will help arrive before she's literally rushed off her feet?		
6	Episode Twenty Eight	Jay Came Back	21 October 2009
6	Toni's recovering but the café has to stay open. How will Olive cope and why is Mack taking credit for the situation? Jay gets a blast from the past...		
6	Episode Twenty Nine	Competition Huh?	22 October 2009
6	Fin gets to know everyone in her own unique way. And who's the number one suspect when the café's till is found empty?		
6	Episode Thirty	I Think She's Cool	23 October 2009
6	Toni clears up the mystery of the missing cash, but some of the accusations were harsh and personal. Jay stands up for Fin, but will Stephen stand up for Olive?		
7	Episode Thirty One	I Don't Think We Can Be Friends	26 October 2009
7	Olive gets an offer but she's not sure if she can accept. Fin's got a cunning plan and just who is Stephen's late night visitor?		
7	Episode Thirty Two	What You After Little Joey For?	27 October 2009
7	Stephen's guest gets the seal of approval from Mack, while Jay and Fin play detective to find out where the café's rent goes.		
7	Episode Thirty Three	Olive Loxley Means Nothing To Me	28 October 2009
7	Stephen and Rosa are revising, but why does one of the poems affect Stephen so much?		
7	Episode Thirty Four	He Lost The House In A Poker Game?!	29 October 2009
7	Jay finds out his family is bigger than he thought and Fin takes a chance with his future. Meanwhile, Olive comforts Toni while she frets about the café.		
7	Episode Thirty Five	Give Me The Deeds Jay	30 October 2009
7	Everything rests on the turn of a card – can Fin and Jay hold their nerve? And who's joining Stephen at the gig?		
8	Episode Thirty Six	When Is Stephen's Interview?	2 November 2009
8	Stephen's got an urgent appointment, but it's miles away – how's he going to get there? Meanwhile, Toni gets the letter she's been dreading.		
8	Episode Thirty Seven	Chasing Her Only Makes Her Stay Away Longer...	3 November 2009
8	Mack meets Fin and they bond immediately, while Jay and Marla talk about the future and family.		
8	Episode Thirty Eight	Do You Have A Boyfriend?	4 November 2009
8	Stephen's interview begins, but the questions aren't what he expected. And who's making money out of Mack back in London?		
8	Episode Thirty Nine	I'm Not Selling The Café To Mack!	5 November 2009
8	Mack shows Fin his plans, which immediately sets her mind racing, but will Jay go along with her moneymaking scheme? And will the health inspection make Toni snap?		
8	Episode Forty	Tell Her...Now...Or I Will!	6 November 2009
8	Stephen and Olive meet up, but how much have things changed since the last time? Jay knows he needs to come clean to the Loxley's, but confrontation's never easy...		
9	Episode Forty One	I'm Not Going To Be Too Young Forever	9 November 2009
9	Enter Tommy, who's organising an underage club event that looks set to be the talk of The Cut...		
9	Episode Forty Two	I Think You Do OK As You Are	10 November 2009
9	Marla convinces Jay to come to the canal with her, but little does he know the REAL reason she wants to go, plus Jay and Fin don't see eye to eye...		
9	Episode Forty Three	Wanna Get Out Of Here?	11 November 2009
9	Jay warned Fin to stay away from Mack, but is she really gonna do as he says? Plus Stephen's up to something again...		
9	Episode Forty Four	You're Unbelievable	12 November 2009
9	It's Tommy's club night and there are a couple of surprises in store for Olive... but one of them REALLY isn't good.		
9	Episode Forty Five	There Must Be A Phone Number	13 November 2009
9	Olive isn't as hurt as she could have been by Stephen's actions when a certain someone comforts her. Meanwhile, Jay has a great idea that could help Marla work out where her mum is and Fin needs somewhere to stay... but where?		
10	Episode Forty Six	You've Got Potential	16 November 2009
10	Olive and Rosa unite to form the 'Stephen's Ex-girlfriends Club'. First order of business: really annoy Stephen. Meanwhile, Marla gives Fin some food for thought...		
10	Episode Forty Seven	Got Your Eye On Anyone?	17 November 2009
10	Stephen stoops to an all-time low when he humiliates Olive yet AGAIN, while Marla finds her mum's diary and decides to do a spot of investigating. Just where does Mack go every day?		
10	Episode Forty Eight	I Got You This...	18 November 2009
10	Fin reveals she's got a surprise for Jay, and Stephen is angry with her when he sees she's got his mum's camera. But is he really as sentimental as he makes out?		
10	Episode Forty Nine	Only Ever With You...	19 November 2009
10	Olive asks Toni for some advice, Marla ups the ante in the search for her mum and there's a VERY surprising celebrity appearance...		
10	Episode Fifty	Worried What She'll Say?	20 November 2009
10	Jay makes it very clear where his allegiances lie and Marla demands answers once and for all... but what will happen when she gets them?		
11	Episode Fifty One	This Is It	23 November 2009
11	Marla's well on her way to Brighton to see her mum, but will her mum want to see her? Rosa comes to Olive's rescue in a milkshake related incident and Fin proves she's turning into quite the domestic goddess. Sort of.		
11	Episode Fifty Two	I Just Want To Apologise	24 November 2009
11	Marla and Jay take some time out to go paddling – but when it comes to Marla's mum, are they in too deep? Meanwhile, Tommy's got something to say to Olive...		
11	Episode Fifty Three	I Need Time To Think	25 November 2009
11	Things between Fin and Stephen seem to be hotting up and Marla finally convinces her mum to talk... but does she really want to know the truth?		
11	Episode Fifty Four	I Know I'm Right About This	26 November 2009
11	The camera Stephen gave to Olive is jammed, giving Rosa an idea. Meanwhile, ever the gentleman, Jay's there to keep Marla warm.		
11	Episode Fifty Five	I Didn't Want It To Be Like This	27 November 2009
11	As Marla and Jay have a heart to heart, she realises just how much he means to her...		
12	Episode Fifty Six	But You Said...	30 November 2009
12	In the cold light of day, Marla has a decision to make: will she face her problems or will she run? Meanwhile, the Stephen and Fin scandal is nearly uncovered by the one person they REALLY don't want to find out...		
12	Episode Fifty Seven	This Your Place?	1 December 2009
12	After an eventful trip to Brighton, Marla's got a lot on her mind and Jay's not sure where he stands. Luckily, Fin should be able to cheer him up with a certain surprise she's got planned...		
12	Episode Fifty Eight	Could We Go Somewhere?	2 December 2009
12	Tommy apologises to Olive, but is she really gonna forgive him that easily? Meanwhile, Jay 'fesses up to Fin that he's really worried about Marla...		
12	Episode Fifty Nine	I'm Her Friend...	3 December 2009
12	Olive and Tommy have a laugh in the art room, but when faced with the choice between his 'cool' friends and her, who will he pick?		
12	Episode Sixty	How Do You Feel About Moving To The Moon?	4 December 2009
12	Marla finally decides to tell Jay the big secret about her dad... but she's not the only one on The Cut that knows.		
13	Episode Sixty One	Do You Want Me To Stop?	7 December 2009
13	Stephen lets Fin know exactly what he wants from their relationship, but is Fin prepared to settle on his terms?		
13	Episode Sixty Two	A Romantic Glance Over The Café Counter	8 December 2009
13	Marla finally confronts Mack about his affair with Toni. Stephen discovers he's got into Oxford, but for some strange reason keeps the news to himself.		
13	Episode Sixty Three	That Split Second	9 December 2009
13	Rosa plays matchmaker as she's got a sneaky suspicion Tommy's interested in Olive. Meanwhile, Marla's on a mission to get her family back together and she's determined that nobody, including Toni, will stop her.		
13	Episode Sixty Four	Special Rebel Lessons	10 December 2009
13	Tommy tells Fin that he plans to invite Olive to the party and Toni's desperate to keep Olive protected from the secret, but will Mack come to her rescue?		
13	Episode Sixty Five	I Wanted To Ask	11 December 2009
13	Marla's at breaking point, ready to tell Stephen about the affair, but will Mack manage to stop her? Meanwhile, Olive finally confronts Toni about the pictures on the camera. Will she finally come clean?		
14	Episode Sixty Six	Can You Believe Him?	14 December 2009
14	Olive's been left with the decision of whom to go to the ball with, but will Stephen force Tommy away before Olive even gets a chance to decide?		
14	Episode Sixty Seven	Olive Loxley...You Heartbreaker	15 December 2009
14	Jay warns Fin that spending too much time with Stephen could end in disaster. Meanwhile, there's a surprise package waiting for Olive.		
14	Episode Sixty Eight	Show Me	16 December 2009
14	Tommy admits to Rosa that it might all be over with Olive, but little does he know Olive's having second thoughts about going with Stephen.		
14	Episode Sixty Nine	I Love The Necklace...	17 December 2009
14	It seems nothing can tear Jay and Marla apart until a certain someone's arrival changes everything. Meanwhile, Olive finally decides who to go with to the ball.		
14	Episode Seventy	Tommy...You Tried...	18 December 2009
14	Marla's so wrapped up in family bliss, Jay's practically forgotten and Tommy gets close to Rosa... REALLY close.		
15	Episode Seventy One	Don't Make Me Choose	18 December 2009
15	Marla finally has her mum back and things are looking up for the Mackinnons, but where does Jay fit into this seemingly perfect picture? Elsewhere, plans for the party are well underway and Fin admits to Tommy that she saw him with Rosa...		
15	Episode Seventy Two	You've Got To Win Mack...	18 December 2009
15	Olive's fairytale dreams of going to the party are dashed when Mrs Mackinnon stops by the café to deliver some bad news. Meanwhile, Fin gives Jay some advice on how to get into Mack's good books... but is she underestimating Mack?		
15	Episode Seventy Three	I'm Going To Look Like A Complete Loser	18 December 2009
15	The Mackinnons attempt to play 'happy families', but is everything as it seems on the surface? Meanwhile, Jay makes a huge decision that could impact a lot of people...		
15	Episode Seventy Four	What Happened In Brighton?	18 December 2009
15	It's the eve of the big party, but with Stephen stuck at home, Olive alone in her bedroom and Fin waiting to be picked up, is anyone actually going to go?		
15	Episode Seventy Five	He Asked Me First...	18 December 2009
15	In the explosive series finale, Tommy confronts Stephen about Olive, but which boy will win her heart? Meanwhile, things aren't as they seem on the dark streets of The Cut and danger lurks on every corner...		

=== Series 2 (Apr – Aug 2010) ===
In February 2010 it was announced that the BBC has commissioned a second series of The Cut with a 13-part series which again each episode would be split up throughout each week in daily five-minute chunks. Open auditions for a new male (Alex) and a new female role (Catherine) were held shortly before the second series began filming, although many young hopefuls impressed the producers, but were not suited to those characters and had characters written for them instead, resulting in a lot more characters being introduced in the second series. The second series began airing on 24 April 2010 and concluded on 14 August 2010. A four-week break was taken after the first 8 episodes due to Wimbledon and the World Cup taking place. No repeats as yet have been shown of the second series, probably because the third series started less than two months later.

In the first episode, Frankie, Cameron, Alex and Rory are introduced. Episode 4 introduces Catherine and Episode 5 introduces Elliott. In the first few episodes, Rosa plays an extremely important role before disappearing from the series without explanation. Tommy is written out of the series at the end of Episode 6, but later returns at the end of Episode 12, just before the finale. Jay returns at the end of Episode 10, and stays for the rest of the series before being written out again, this time for good. Amy is also written out at the end of the series and Olive is killed off.

#	Episode	Episode Title	Original airdate
16	Episode One	Just Heard The Weirdest Rumour	19 April 2010
16	It's the new term at Deaconsfield and Tommy's brother is already in bother. And why is Olive so worried about the mysterious 'new boy'?		
16	Episode Two	You're A Somebody Now	20 April 2010
16	The whole Olive-Stephen-Tommy thing is still red hot goss round the school and Olive's finding all the attention a bit hard to deal with. Cameron's sympathetic, but he's got other things on his mind (namely, Marla).		
16	Episode Three	Where Would He Get A Horse From?	21 April 2010
16	Does Stephen still have feelings for Olive? Does Olive still care about him? Could his stare be any moodier? And has Toni actually recovered from her attack – she's acting very oddly.		
16	Episode Four	Geeks, Nobodies, Losers...	22 April 2010
16	Now that Olive's dating Tommy, everyone wants to be her best mate. All that attention could easily make a girl forget about her friends from before. Her real friends. Olive wouldn’t do that, though... would she?		
16	Episode Five	Freed From The Ranks Of The Freaks	23 April 2010
16	While Tommy's playing basketball with the lads, Olive makes it up to Frankie and Cam. Stephen drops by the court to see Olive, and Rosa gives him a piece of her mind. An angry piece.		
17	Episode Six	More STDs Than GCSEs	26 April 2010
17	Olive's 16th is just around the corner, and it just happens to coincide with the biggest party of the year – brilliant! Everyone who is anyone is going, but with Toni jumping at shadows, will she let Olive go?		
17	Episode Seven	The Right Way	27 April 2010
17	The police turn their inquiry onto Jay, and Marla knows something, but will she speak up? Meanwhile, Rory gets a taste of just how devious Alex can be, and Frankie gets some juicy dirt on Rosa.		
17	Episode Eight	Worse Than 15	28 April 2010
17	Tommy is worried about Olive and Stephen – and Rosa isn't helping. Frankie knows the score, but she's not telling, leaving Olive facing a difficult choice at Tommy's insistence.		
17	Episode Nine	Boys And Parties	29 April 2010
17	Olive makes a tough decision, but it's not enough to keep Stephen and Tommy from swapping threats. Meanwhile, Cameron and Frankie play detective, and come up with an interesting theory on the recent attack on Toni.		
17	Episode Ten	Between Me And Olive	30 April 2010
17	As Rosa closes in on Tommy, Frankie's stirring gets Stephen all fired up. This is not gonna be pretty. Elsewhere, Cameron has a go at winning over Marla, with disastrous results.		
18	Episode Eleven	This Calls For Outside Help	3 May 2010
18	The big party is waiting, but only if Olive and Frankie can get past Toni. Tommy will be there, but unfortunately for him, so will his brother, Alex. Can anyone else smell trouble, or is that just Alex's aftershave?		
18	Episode Twelve	Why Do You Torture Yourself?	4 May 2010
18	The party is hotting up, and so is Rosa! She's got Tommy right where she wants him. It's a good job Olive's not here to see it. Oh... hang on a minute.		
18	Episode Thirteen	You Could Have Avoided All This	5 May 2010
18	With Olive now super-miffed at him, Tommy has to turn on the charm and leave it running to win her over. Meanwhile, is Alex really putting the moves on Rosa? That can't possibly work, can it?		
18	Episode Fourteen	Go Get Her, Tiger	6 May 2010
18	Love is in the air! With Tommy and Olive all made up, Cameron decides it's time to kickstart Operation Marla. Oh dear... this is not gonna be pretty.		
18	Episode Fifteen	You Might Enjoy It As Well	7 May 2010
18	With the party behind them, things are looking rosy for Tommy and Olive again. All they need is for Alex not to play the trump card he picked up from Rosa. Uh oh...		
19	Episode Sixteen	The Morning After	10 May 2010
19	Gasp! Where did Olive stay last night? And more importantly, can Tommy get to the incriminating text on her phone before she does?		
19	Episode Seventeen	I've Got A Plan	11 May 2010
19	Tommy stoops to new lows to prevent his and Rosa's secret from getting back to Olive. Meanwhile, Alex's meddling scales new heights of dastardly, as he forms an allegiance with Deaconsfield's very own Dark Knight.		
19	Episode Eighteen	Who Grounds Someone On Their 16th?	12 May 2010
19	Tommy has stern words with Rosa, but that's nothing compared to what he's gonna do when he finds Alex. And with Tommy out of the way, Rosa gets to work on Olive's trust issues. This girl is brutal.		
19	Episode Nineteen	We Could Get A Coffee	13 May 2010
19	While Marla is enjoying her surprise visit from an old friend, the forces of darkness are moving in on Tommy and Olive: Alex and Stephen's plans take shape, and Rosa's cranking her charms up to overdrive. Stay strong, Tommy!		
19	Episode Twenty	Juice	14 May 2010
19	Cameron gets a crash course in wooing from Frankie and it proves a little too effective. It's not so lovey dovey for Olive and Tommy, as he and Rosa race to be the one to reveal to her their big secret.		
20	Episode Twenty One	You're Perfect To Me	17 May 2010
20	Now that Tommy and Rosa's secret is out, where does everyone go from here? Olive sets out on the road to recovery, while Frankie goes on the warpath. Clear a space people.		
20	Episode Twenty Two	Single Ladies	18 May 2010
20	Tommy is desperate to get back into Olive's good books, but he needs to find the right words. Maybe Cameron can help him out, he seems to be doing OK with Marla's friend Catherine. Hmm, on second thoughts...		
20	Episode Twenty Three	He Treated Her Like A Muppet	19 May 2010
20	With Elliot's encouragement, Cameron takes a spirited stand against Marla. Go, Cam! By contrast, Stephen's got nothing but kind words for Olive, and boy, do they hit home! Go, Stephen!		
20	Episode Twenty Four	Pretty Public Snogging	20 May 2010
20	Olive's in a forgiving mood, which is good news for Tommy. He'd better make the most of it though, cos the dark alliance of Alex and Stephen have made their move; There's something pretty dodgy lurking in Tommy's locker.		
20	Episode Twenty Five	So What Happens Now?	21 May 2010
20	It's band audition time, and Cameron's got the horn, but has he got the X-Factor? Meanwhile, it's show time for Tommy, and the spotlight's on the contents of his locker. This isn't going to end well...		
21	Episode Twenty Six	The Eek In Geek	24 May 2010
21	Everyone seems to have been affected by the Tommy revelation, but as Tommy gets ready to face the music there's only one person who doesn't seem too upset by the whole thing...		
21	Episode Twenty Seven	You Should Learn To Have An Opinion	25 May 2010
21	Tensions are running high between almost everyone in The Cut. Marla is less than impressed when Catherine reveals her money-making plans and the Fitzpatrick brothers have a head to head. Only Cameron seems in his element...		
21	Episode Twenty Eight	Should Never Have Given You A Second Chance	26 May 2010
21	Cameron blows both his trumpet and his chances with his beautiful brass buddy when Frankie embarrasses him, but the only person who's really having to face the music is Tommy when Olive tells it to him straight.		
21	Episode Twenty Nine	I've Given Up Tryin To Understand	27 May 2010
21	Olive struggles to cope with the Tommy situation... but how will she react when she finds out she won't have to cope much longer?		
21	Episode Thirty	Its Human Nature To Be Selfish	28 May 2010
21	With Tommy packing his bags and Olive devastated, the guilt begins to eat away at Stephen and he turns to Mack for some fatherly advice. But is it too late to undo his mistakes? And will Tommy really leave The Cut forever?		
22	Episode Thirty One	Its Only A B	31 May 2010
22	With a Tommy-shaped hole left in The Cut, Olive tries to get on with life – which is easier said than done when a certain someone seems to be reaping the benefits of his departure.		
22	Episode Thirty Two	Its Time This Café Got A Life	1 June 2010
22	It's parents' evening and Catherine's left in charge of locking up the café, but she's got other ideas. Meanwhile, Marla and Elliott's study evening doesn't quite go to plan... unless having a door slammed in his face was all part of Elliott's plan, of course.		
22	Episode Thirty Three	Human Pyramids	2 June 2010
22	The café party is hotting up, but it's not long before things take a sour turn... Meanwhile, Frankie digs a little deeper into the Jay Kelso/Loxley connection and Toni gets an unexpected blast from the past.		
22	Episode Thirty Four	Mango, Coconut And Vodka	3 June 2010
22	Marla discovers what's really giving the party its edge and Frankie decides to show everyone what she's really made of.		
22	Episode Thirty Five	Massive	4 June 2010
22	Frankie's mission to find out if Jay is behind the string of attacks in the area leads her into grave danger, but if no one knows where she's gone then who'll be there to save her?		
23	Episode Thirty Six	That Boy Is A Dark Horse	7 June 2010
23	Elliott's playfulness reaches its peak, and he lays down an interesting challenge to Marla (just kiss already!).		
23	Episode Thirty Seven	OMGYGB2K	8 June 2010
23	In order to raise money, George places the band at the mercy of a student auction. What's the going price for a Frankie these days, anyway? How much???		
23	Episode Thirty Eight	With A Punch That Quick It Barely Shows	9 June 2010
23	With the band auctioned off, their owners for the day get to have some fun. No one is having as much fun as Elliott and Marla though. Meanwhile, Stephen has some more murky dealings with Alex.		
23	Episode Thirty Nine	Couldn't Stick To The No Touching Rule	10 June 2010
23	Things get heated between Cameron and Frankie, and not in a good way. Things are also getting a bit warm between Olive and... Alex? That can't be good, can it?		
23	Episode Forty	This Doesn't Make Me Your Girlfriend	11 June 2010
23	Alex and Stephen's plans for Olive hit a snag when they discover they have a conflict of interest. No such problems for Elliott and Marla though. Is this the start of something special?		
24	Episode Forty One	She Doesn't Even See Me	12 July 2010
24	It's school trip time and the race for the most amorously advantageous seats is on. Can one coach contain the collective emotional tension of Deaconfield's sixth formers? Let the chaos begin.		
24	Episode Forty Two	A Year, Three Months And 17 Days	13 July 2010
24	The coach trip trundles on, but love is about to hit the skids unless Cameron can keep his stomach in check. Hold it in, man!		
24	Episode Forty Three	I Guess I've Got Less To Lose	14 July 2010
24	As Cameron's travel sickness turns into a chunderstorm, there are ominous rumblings between Alex, Stephen and Olive. And with the coach broken down, Elliott's Olympic dream seems further away than ever.		
24	Episode Forty Four	Stephen's Obsessed With You	15 July 2010
24	There're an awful lot of mixed signals flying around; Frankie and Cameron, Cameron and Catherine, Stephen and Olive, Frankie and DEAN??? Yeah, that one's gonna take some explaining, right Frankie?		
24	Episode Forty Five	What Would Big Dog Do?	16 July 2010
24	Will Elliott get any closer to the 2012 Olympics? Will Cameron and Frankie ever get it on? Will Stephen ever tell Olive the truth? Will Olive ever separate her face from Stephen's??? Answers to some of these questions are here!		
25	Episode Forty Six	Like You Still Think About Me	19 July 2010
25	Marla can't wait for her 18th but there's also someone else on her mind. Toni and Mack are on the warpath to find out where Olive and Stephen are...but will they get distracted from their search?		
25	Episode Forty Seven	Dad, Where's My Car?	20 July 2010
25	It's Marla's birthday but she doesn't quite get what she's expecting. At least she's not in Saturday detention, unlike Alex. The band need to sell more advance tickets for the gig, but how will Olive feel about channelling a bit of Ke$ha? And Elliott decides to make up for Marla's disappointment by showing her a good time with just the change in his pocket. What a guy.		
25	Episode Forty Eight	Look At My Lunch	21 July 2010
25	Elliott puts the 'man' in 'romantic' by pulling a surprise out of the bag for Marla, whilst Frankie auditions to take Olive's place in the band. Catherine arrives for her big audition and Stephen confronts Mack about what he saw.		
25	Episode Forty Nine	You're Such A Hypocrite	22 July 2010
25	It all falls into place with Stephen about why his parents feel the way they do about Olive, whilst Elliott tells Marla she's a cheap date. Detention's finally over for Alex, but not before a showdown with Rory. And Cameron finds out he might have a bit of competition when it comes to Catherine.		
25	Episode Fifty	My Confusatron	23 July 2010
25	It's party time and Cameron decides he will go to Marla's 18th after all. Rory turns up at the café to apologise to Toni and when everything seems to be going swimmingly at the party, Marla gets a blast from the past.		
26	Episode Fifty One	Some Serious Frankie-Panky	26 July 2010
26	Is Marla's night made or ruined by the presence of her surprise guest?		
26	Episode Fifty Two	She's Still My Little Girl	27 July 2010
26	Cameron realises exactly what halloumi is slightly too late and Olive demands some answers from Stephen.		
26	Episode Fifty Three	I Feel Sick	28 July 2010
26	Amy gives Marla some boy advice, before a particularly awkward family photo. Cringe!		
26	Episode Fifty Four	Just Feel The Music	29 July 2010
26	Cam and Frankie pull out all the stops to get noticed at the party and Elliott says it how it is.		
26	Episode Fifty Five	It's You And Me	30 July 2010
26	The party's wrapping up, but who ends up wrapped around each other? And something's definitely going on with Amy, what is she plotting??		
27	Episode Fifty Six	It's A Wonder You Don't Have Whiplash	2 August 2010
27	It's the morning after the night before and there's a lot of pieces to pick up.		
27	Episode Fifty Seven	What's The Worst That Could Happen?	3 August 2010
27	Everyone's acting a bit weird and Elliott tries his luck with Marla.		
27	Episode Fifty Eight	Heard The Canteen Is The Place To Hang Out...	4 August 2010
27	It's Jay's turn to proposition Marla and what is up with Alex?		
27	Episode Fifty Nine	He's Definitely Embracing The Crazy...	5 August 2010
27	Catherine and Marla seem to have a lot in common at the moment and Alex finally cracks.		
27	Episode Sixty	An Adventure For The Ears...	6 August 2010
27	Catherine's playlist surprises even Cameron and Alex's lies escalate.		
28	Episode Sixty One	Breaking Point	9 August 2010
28	Tommy's back and wants to know what's going on and Frankie and Olive talk boys.		
28	Episode Sixty Two	Why Are You Being So Weak?	10 August 2010
28	Tommy's got his brother's back and it's all go in the Loxely's café.		
28	Episode Sixty Three	You Kissed Him?	11 August 2010
28	There's a showdown in the café and Amy has some news.		
28	Episode Sixty Four	You're My First Love	12 August 2010
28	It's the night of the big gig and tensions are running high.		
28	Episode Sixty Five	Last Night I Dreamt...	13 August 2010
28	It's the finale of series 2 but will life in The Cut ever be the same again?		

=== Series 3 (Sept – Dec 2010) ===
In July 2010 it was announced that the BBC had commissioned a third series of The Cut. Series 3 began on 2 October 2010 and concluded on 18 December 2010. The third series is 12 episodes long with each episode being split up in daily five minute segments like the previous two series. While this series was airing, it was the consensus of many fans that with the closure of BBC Switch, Series 3 might be the final series, but this had not been confirmed by the BBC at that point, although it now has been. After the first episode, a one-week break was taken due to The Commonwealth Games airing on the BBC, but an interactive episode launched on the Facebook page during the week, depicting Catherine's first day at Radio 1. The second and third episodes were shown together as a double bill.

As with the previous two series, Series 3 introduces several new characters. Episode 1 introduces Jack, Ryan, Ruby and Taylor. Luke is introduced in Episode 2 and Noah in Episode 4. Toni and Tommy are both written out at the start of the first episode – they appear at Olive's funeral and then both announce that they're leaving. Stephen plays a much less important role in this series – he leaves to go to Oxford at the end of Episode 3, although he appears briefly when Alex phones him in Episode 11, and he also appears in Episode 12 (the finale.) Rosa also returns in Series 3, in a recurring role similar to the role she played in Series 1. In Episode 2, it is announced that Rory has left, having not appeared since the end of Series 2. Amy also reappears unexpectedly in the final two episodes, and Olive appears as a ghostly apparition in the final scene.

#	Episode	Episode Title	Original airdate
29	Episode One	Ghost In The Head	27 September 2010
29	The brand new series of The Cut kicks off with some very painful goodbyes.		
29	Episode Two	Wake	28 September 2010
29	Toni has a huge announcement for everyone and Stephen is struggling to cope without Olive...		
29	Episode Three	Six Weeks Later	29 September 2010
29	Two new strangers like the look of The Loxley's café, but what about Mack's promise to Toni? And who is Catherine's friend from Radio One?		
29	Episode Four	Got Any Mustard?	30 September 2010
29	Stephen has some decisions to make about his future, but is he ready to face them? Meanwhile, things are getting a bit too 'saucy' between Catherine and Tom for Cam's liking.		
29	Episode Five	Fresh Starts	1 October 2010
29	Marla and Elliott nearly get caught out, and just who is this Taylor character?		
30	Episode Six	I Hate The First Day Back At School	10 October 2010
30	It's the first day back at Deaconsfield and there's more than a few surprises in store for everyone... especially for Marla.		
30	Episode Seven	Totally Gonna Be The Next Anne Frank	10 October 2010
30	Frankie finds out Luke's secret and Cam attempts to dress to impress (or should that be 'smell to repel'?)		
30	Episode Eight	I Don't Do Fakes	10 October 2010
30	Taylor seems to be showing Marla up at every opportunity, but has she gone too far this time?		
30	Episode Nine	Way Better Than Betty	10 October 2010
30	Elliott tries a man to man with Luke, only to discover something he didn't bargain for. Meanwhile, Frankie receives an urgent message...		
30	Episode Ten	Is It the Way I Dress?	10 October 2010
30	Catherine has some news for Cam and Marla has her sights set on some serious revenge for Taylor... but will it work?		
31	Episode Eleven	Not Under My Roof	11 October 2010
31	Stephen's due back, but how will he handle life without Olive?		
31	Episode Twelve	Can't Get A Mate	12 October 2010
31	With Oxford registration looming, what's Stephen going to do?		
31	Episode Thirteen	Desperate...With Desire...For You	13 October 2010
31	Taylor spreads the gossip, but how will Cam react when he finds out?		
31	Episode Fourteen	Apophallation	14 October 2010
31	Biology class is pretty informative, and Stephen faces his demons.		
31	Episode Fifteen	Take Her With You	15 October 2010
31	Cameron and Frankie make a decision, while Marla takes a test.		
32	Episode Sixteen	The Benedick Sexpress	18 October 2010
32	Cam's being weird and Marla's suddenly got a lot on her mind.		
32	Episode Seventeen	The Pumpatron 3000	19 October 2010
32	Cameron's plan fails miserably when he bumps into a familiar face at the shops. Meanwhile, Alex is up to his usual tricks.		
32	Episode Eighteen	Stephen Was A Mistake	20 October 2010
32	Marla and Elliott's relationship is under strain... will she ever find the courage to tell him what's going on? Meanwhile, Catherine's starting to really settle into Radio One.		
32	Episode Nineteen	Puck And Bottom, They're Mine!	21 October 2010
32	Luke's got a plan to make a few quid, but will getting Noah involved pay off? Elsewhere, Cameron's preparing for what he thinks will be the biggest test of his life.		
32	Episode Twenty	Consider Us Your Personal Glee Club	22 October 2010
32	Frankie and Cam's big moment is finally here, but will they really go through with it? Meanwhile, Mack and Taylor attempt to cheer Marla up but Catherine known's something's not right...		
33	Episode Twenty One	Most Haunted	25 October 2010
33	As Halloween approaches it's all getting a bit spooky... and in the cold light of day, will Cam and Frankie be weirded-out about doing 'it'?		
33	Episode Twenty Two	Fear Factor 100	26 October 2010
33	Always one to get what she wants, Taylor's got a plan to make the hottest guy in the school fall for her... but at whose expense? Meanwhile, Marla's got a huge decision to make.		
33	Episode Twenty Three	Axe Wielding Maniacs	27 October 2010
33	Greg and Taylor get close via the magic of, err, rubber bands and Marla faces up to some very harsh realities.		
33	Episode Twenty Four	Even Nice Guys Do It	28 October 2010
33	It's the big Halloween party and it might not be part of her costume, but Taylor definitely gets a touch of the green-eyed monster about her. Meanwhile, Marla's got plans to make Catherine pay...		
33	Episode Twenty Five	Trick or Treat?	29 October 2010
33	Frankie confronts Cameron about his no-show and, with Greg out the picture, Taylor seeks comfort elsewhere... but has she gone too far this time?		
34	Episode Twenty Six	Sunday Mornings Are For One Thing	1 November 2010
34	Marla's got a guilty conscience and Ryan's got a Taylor-sized problem to deal with.		
34	Episode Twenty Seven	I'll Pray For You	2 November 2010
34	Taylor's got a point to prove but it doesn't go quite as planned, and Jack and Alex find some common ground.		
34	Episode Twenty Eight	Vanilla, Please	3 November 2010
34	Marla hatches a plan and Taylor's a smart girl when it comes to getting what she wants.		
34	Episode Twenty Nine	My Rules, Always	4 November 2010
34	Noah goes a step too far for Frankie and everyone's after Macks money.		
34	Episode Thirty	Eight Hundred Pounds	5 November 2010
34	Frankie and Marla have both got some making up to do, but have they messed up too much to be forgiven?		
35	Episode Thirty One	Your Secret's Safe With Me	8 November 2010
35	Marla and Elliott have some huge decisions to make that aren't made any easier by Taylor's snooping...		
35	Episode Thirty Two	You're Meant To Be In P.E.	9 November 2010
35	Frankie's got a new admirer, but she's got more important things on her mind. Meanwhile, Alex has got a surprise for Jack...		
35	Episode Thirty Three	I'm Trying To Be A Friend To You	10 November 2010
35	Frankie admits some home truths to Noah and Marla snubs Taylor, but is that a dangerous move?		
35	Episode Thirty Four	We're Never Going To Be Friends	11 November 2010
35	Taylor shows a softer side, but will Marla open up to her?		
35	Episode Thirty Five	Don't Take A Risk	12 November 2010
35	Cameron realises he doesn't want to be pushed out by Noah, but is he too late? Meanwhile, Taylor has some news for Elliott.		
36	Episode Thirty Six	It's Your Baby	15 November 2010
36	Catherine's preparing for the radio station launch and Taylor's question is playing on Elliott's mind.		
36	Episode Thirty Seven	There's Something Weird With Everyone	16 November 2010
36	Alex is suspicious and everything gets a bit too much for Marla.		
36	Episode Thirty Eight	You're Late. En Retard	17 November 2010
36	Catherine interviews DJ Ironik to open Deaconsfield FM and Frankie has an awkward decision to make.		
36	Episode Thirty Nine	I Hate You	18 November 2010
36	Mack's got a thing or two to say about Marla and Elliott's news and Cam and Noah get hot and er... weepy... in the kitchen.		
36	Episode Forty	Poetry Breathes	19 November 2010
36	Elliott's got a point to prove in the swimming pool and Cam and Frankie have a not-so-conventional heart to heart.		
37	Episode Forty One	It's So Much More Fun To Tease	22 November 2010
37	Frankie and Cam are the talk of the school, and Marla gets a bit of tlc.		
37	Episode Forty Two	Stop Pretending You're Some Kind Of Sexpert	23 November 2010
37	Frankie's had enough and Marla and Elliott reach breaking point.		
37	Episode Forty Three	All Looks And Nothing Else	24 November 2010
37	Alex gets the chance to do some snooping on Jack, but will he find what he's looking for?		
37	Episode Forty Four	Don't Tell Anyone But...	25 November 2010
37	Catherine gets some good news and Cam's got a confession to make.		
37	Episode Forty Five	Miss. America	26 November 2010
37	Taylor's bullying goes a step too far.		
38	Episode Forty Six	I Give You Till Sunset	29 November 2010
38	Marla and Elliott have had enough of Mack, but will they really go through with their plan? Meanwhile, Alex and Jack's relationship turns a little sour...		
38	Episode Forty Seven	Got Any Venus Fly-Traps?	30 November 2010
38	With Alex reigning supreme as the new school hero, Noah's feeling inspired...		
38	Episode Forty Eight	You Ever Kissed A Girl?	1 December 2010
38	Marla puts on a brave face despite her troubles. After all, everything will be okay if her and Elliott stick together... won't it?		
38	Episode Forty Nine	So In Love	2 December 2010
38	Alex just can't let his suspicions about Jack lie... but was he right to trust his instinct?		
38	Episode Fifty	This One's For You Frankie	3 December 2010
38	Frankie opens up to Jack, but is he all he seems? Meanwhile, Elliott wants an answer...		
39	Episode Fifty One	I Know You. You're Trouble.	6 December 2010
39	As the sun rises on a new day and Frankie doesn't return home, Alex starts to panic.		
39	Episode Fifty Two	Let Mortal Kombat Begin	7 December 2010
39	Marla decides to bite the bullet and tell Mack the big news, but it doesn't go down quite as expected...		
39	Episode Fifty Three	Two Flipping White Doves	8 December 2010
39	Jack (or should that be 'Andrew'?) starts to show his true colours and Elliott's in for an unwanted blast from the past.		
39	Episode Fifty Four	Pigerama Dovicus	9 December 2010
39	Elliott is faced with a choice... but is he really ready to do a deal with the devil?		
39	Episode Fifty Five	You Are So Adorkable	10 December 2010
39	Alex makes an important phone call where he learns just how dangerous Andrew Cromwell really might be.		
40	Episode Fifty Six	A* In Food Technology	13 December 2010
40	Marla gets even more demanding (if that's possible!) and is there anything that Noah won't do for Rosa?		
40	Episode Fifty Seven	Maybe That's Her Best Future	14 December 2010
40	Jacks behaviour becomes even more erratic, but will Frankie realise what he's capable of?		
40	Episode Fifty Eight	You're Hurting Me	15 December 2010
40	Stephen steps in to try and heal family wounds but are the Mackinnon feuds irreparable?		
40	Episode Fifty Nine	I'm Your Guardian Angel	16 December 2010
40	Frankie's trapped with her brother's killer, as Andrew confronts his past.		
40	Episode Sixty	There's So Much To Tell You...	17 December 2010
40	Marla walks up the aisle, and Frankie, Cam and Alex have a moment at the graveside.		
