= List of The Dreamstone episodes =

This is a list of episodes for the animated TV series The Dreamstone.

The Dreamstone aired between 1990 and 1995 with a total of 4 Seasons and 52 episodes. Each episode has basically the same plot: Zordrak instructs his henchmen to steal the Dreamstone, which he plans to destroy, so that nightmares will plague the sleeping world. The plan usually involves Urpgor, his right-hand man and scientist inventing some means with which the Urpneys – led by Sergeant Blob, an archetypal Sergeant Major type – crosses the Mist of Limbo (a vast Purple Mist) to get to the Land of Dreams. The plan invariably fails, the main problem being the cowardice and incompetence of the Urpneys, who often want no more than to 'go home' and get some sandwiches.

== Series 1 (1990) ==
#	Episode Title	Summary	Air Date
1	The Dreamstone (AKA The Dreamstone: Part One)	Zordrak's new leader of the Urpneys, Sgt. Blob sets off to steal the Dreamstone aided by Frizz and Nug. In the Land of Dreams, a Noop called Rufus soon finds himself a job as a Dream Maker. Blob, Fizz and Nug raid the tower, steal the Dreamstone and take Amberley with them.	25 September 1990
2	Into Viltheed (AKA The Dreamstone: Part Two)	Rufus sets off to Viltheed accompanied by Pildit. Zordrak's attack separates Pildit from Rufus, so Rufus ventures into Zordrak's fortress alone restoring Amberley from her stone form. Together they recover the Dreamstone and with Pildit's help, make their escape.	25 September 1990
3	The Knitted Balloon	The Urpneys build a Knitted Balloon, to travel to the Land of Dreams while Zordrak travels there in his spiritual form to possess Amberley and steal the Dreamstone for Blob to collect. Rufus and Albert bring down the balloon, recover the Dreamstone and repel Zordrak.	2 October 1990
4	The Invisible Blob	Urpgor brews an invisibility potion which enables Urpneys to steal the Dreamstone from the Dream Maker unseen. Because they cover the Dreamstone with invisibility potion they lose track of it and end up heading back to Viltheed without it, while Albert smells it out.	9 October 1990
5	The Voice of Zordrak	Urpgor invents a pendant which puts victims in a possessive trance. The Urpneys use this to hypnotise Rufus to steal the Dreamstone, then take them both back to Viltheed. Amberley and Pildit follow and immediately recover the Dreamstone and rescue Rufus.	16 October 1990
6	Albert Is Fishnapped	Believing that the Dream Maker's dogfish Albert is a great hindrance to acquiring the Dreamstone, the Urpneys capture him during the Eclipse festival in the Land of Dreams as ransom bait. Pildit's grandmother Wildit aids in Albert's rescue and expelling the Urpneys.	23 October 1990
7	The Shrinking Stone	Urpgor creates a shrink-ray and shrinks the Urpneys in order to stealthily slip into the Dream Maker's house, then shrink the Dreamstone and take it. The plan fails altogether when Albert swallows the shrink-ray and drives the Urpneys out.	6 November 1990
8	Blob's Incredible Plan	Blob, Frizz and Nug go to vigilantly steal the Dreamstone taking Urpgor's mole machine. Their presence detected, Rufus allows them to run off with a fake Dreamstone after the Dream Maker gives them a hard time. On their return Zordrak finds the Dreamstone is fake and has them sentenced.	13 November 1990
9	Too Hot to Handle	The Urpneys plant some exploding candles to create a diversion in the Dream Maker's house. They get Amberley out of the way, then use their diversion to make the Dreamstone accessible to Zordrak's Argorribles. However, Wildit thwarts their ruse.	20 November 1990
10	The Daydream Bubble	The Dream Maker surprises Rufus and Amberley with a daydream bubble. Launched from Urpgor's cannon as oblivious test subjects, Blob, Nug and Frizz land in the daydream bubble. Also Zordrak's origin of evil is revealed from his transformation as corrupt goat into a dragon. After the daydream is finished, the Urpneys are launched back to Viltheed.	27 November 1990
11	The Statue Collection	Zordrak sends the Urpneys to capture Pildit to add to his statue collections, using 'The Hand of Zordrak'. Rufus, Amberley and Albert crash the Urpneys' Whirlyped then they do battle with a one-eyed sea monster while Albert overcomes his aquaphobia.	4 December 1990
12	Argorrible Attack	Urpgor sends the Urpneys to transport the Argorribles to The Land of Dreams to give the Noops nightmares before the Dreamstone can act. The attack is successful so Rufus and Amberley retaliate in Viltheed with help from the Wuts.	11 December 1990
13	Megattack	After Uprgor upgrades his throne with a rocket jet, Zordrak travels to the Land of Dreams with his Urpney army to face the Dream Maker and the Planet Dreamstone. With Rufus and Amberley's help, Zordrak is banished into space. The 13 episodes were written by Sue Radley, Martin Gates and James Costello.	18 December 1990

== Series 2 (1992) ==
#	Episode Title	Summary	Air Date
1	The Nightmare Stone	Zordrak returns with a counterpart of The Dreamstone, The Nightmare Stone. Rufus and Amberley head Viltheed to steal it for The Dream Maker, who sends it into space, where it came from.	22 January 1992
2	Zarag	Nug opens a bottle, releasing Zordrak's Sister Zarag, who was trapped for 500 years as she disagrees with Zordrak. She steals the Dreamstone to wear in her hair for grand occasions. Soon both sides realise she has the Dreamstone and compete to get it back.	29 January 1992
3	Urpgor's Island	Urpgor has run out of ideas, but thanks to his mobile mudbath and his recently made Boomerang, he came up with an Urpney made island to hide the Dreamstone on, making it hard to find for the Noops when they go to Viltheed, but even harder to find for Sgt Blob.	5 February 1992
4	RoboBird	Urpgor invents a singing RoboBird, so that Noops will take it to the Dreamstone to steal. But first, it puts Frizz and Nug in a trance, then steals the Dreamstone and strays from Urpgor's orders. Urpgor builds a female Robobird, then the Noops beat Urpgor to the Dreamstone.	12 February 1992
5	The Dark Side	With the Dreamstone's power dwindling, the Dream Maker and his friends take it to Planet Dreamstone to be recharged. The Urpneys attempt to ambush them, until both groups crash on the Dark Side, but all make it back to their respective places.	19 February 1992
6	Albert's Ailment	Urpgor invents a teleporter to steal the Dreamstone instantly. Albert becomes ill, and the only cure can be found in Viltheed. Wildit manages to find the mushroom for the cure and save the Dreamstone from being crushed.	26 February 1992
7	The Monster	Blob, Frizz and Nug accidentally activated Urpgor's old invention which becomes a giant robot, obedient once Blob programs it and gets it to steal the Dreamstone. Amberley gets hold of the microphone and neutralises the monster for good.	4 March 1992
8	Spildit	Wildit's Niece Spildit is visiting. Meanwhile, Zordrak travels to the Planet of Doom to recharge his powers, but on his way back, accident through the Whirlpool of time makes him good, ordering the return of the stolen Dreamstone before he reverts to evil.	11 March 1992
9	Wildit's Whistle	Urpgor builds a Locust Mobile to spread leaf eating bugs to put the Wutts out of commission. As the Noops and Wutts keep them at bay, Wildit uses her whistle to summon the bugs' mother to take them all back to Viltheed.	18 March 1992
10	Sports Day	The Noops hold a Sports Day, the prize being Dreamstone-shaped cake. The Urpneys head to the Land of Dreams to acquire a Wutt leaf, then they take this opportunity to steal the Dreamstone but instead steal the cake Dreamstone thanks to Spildit's Switcheroo.	22 April 1992
11	Frozen Assets	The Urpneys travel in Urpgor's Snow Machine to steal the Dreamstone during a Winter Celebration. Albert swallows the Dreamstone for safekeeping, forcing the Urpneys to take him instead, forcing his friends to go to his rescue.	29 April 1992
12	The Bottle Harvest	While Rufus and Amberley help resupply the Dream Maker with dream bottles, the Urpneys use Urpgor's Mekbeav to deprive the bottle trees of water. This is actually a diversion to steal the Dreamstone, only its in safe hands.	6 May 1992
13	Return of the Nightmare Stone	The Nightmare Stone is discovered and the Urpneys beat the Rufus and Amberley to it. Urpgor's attempt to rid Zordrak of the Nightmare Stone gets the whole of Viltheed launched into the sky. Rufus and Amberley are rescued and return to the Dream Maker. The 13 episodes were written in Great Britain by Sue Radley, Martin Gates and John Antrobus.	13 May 1992

== Series 3 (1994) ==
#	Episode Title	Summary	Air Date
1	The Return	Zordrak and his minions ready themselves for revenge against the Land of Dreams as Urpgor hides the Nightmare Stone for good. Blob, Frizz and Nug are launched onto Wutt territory and Spildit brings them back to Viltheed.	7 January 1994 (UK Television); November 11, 1994 (with The Santa Clause); November 18, 1994 (with Miracle on 34th Street)
2	Electric Eggs	The Urpneys find a Battery Fish on the isle of catastrophe for its Electric eggs to power Urgor's tractor beam. Rufus, Amberley, Spildit and Albert go to the island for a Rainbow. Spildit and Albert help the Battery Fish by substituting the eggs for stones.	14 January 1994
3	Moon of Doom	The Urpneys are sent to orbit to get the Moon of Doom, while the Noops are sent with a special magic bubble only to be thwarted by the Urpneys. The Dream Maker creates another magic bubble to repel the Moon of Doom.	21 January 1994
4	Zarag Rules	Zarag creates Obedience Drops to make servants out of some Noops. Urpgor pursues the Urpneys to give them a vital component for their sling machine, but tangles with Zarag. With Zarag distracted, Rufus and Amberley rescue the captured Noops.	28 January 1994
5	The Dream Beam Invasion	Urpgor is going to use a hidden Shrinking machine to shrink Urpneys, send them into the dream beams and invade the Noops' dreams. The first night of invasion is successful, but the Dream Maker, Albert, Rufus and Amberley manage to stop their second invasion (for the most part...).	4 February 1994
6	Urpgor's Auntie	Urpgor needs Time Crystals to power his Time Machine. Blob and his men venture on the trap riddled planet Tempus Figit to get the Time Crystal from Urpgor's Auntie. Rufus, Amberley and Albert follow them and sabotage the Time Crystals resulting in the Machine Machine blowing up.	11 February 1994
7	Wottles	The Urpneys use a MoleMobile car to cut the roots of the Dreambottle trees, trying to brave the "vicious" Wottles. The Wottles are actually friendly creatures, helping Amberley to chase off the Urpneys.	18 February 1994
8	The Mirror	Urpgor builds a robot to steal the Dreamstone by itself. Unbeknownst to him, Blob and his men are trapped inside as it carries out its mission. The robot unwittingly saves Rufus and Amberley as they fix the Dream Maker's sun mirror in the Mirror Lake.	25 February 1994
9	Spildit's Birthday	Urpgor builds a Mech Fish to look like Albert. Blob and his men go in disguise to capture Albert, but Amberley and Spildit discover their ruse, then switch the Mech Fish for the real Albert to surprise them and recover the Dreamstone.	4 March 1994
10	A Day Out	Rufus and Amberley go hiking and skiing with the Dreamstone (which Spildit packed by mistake). During a failed mission, the Urpneys snatch the Dreamstone. Rufus and Amberley hastily recover the Dreamstone and crash all the Whirleypeds.	11 March 1994
11	Urpgor's Great Adventure	Urpgors undergoes his own mission in an all-terrain vehicle to steal the Dreamstone and he kidnaps Albert in the process. Rufus and Amberley foil his attempt and Blob's group and Urpgor clash with each other.	18 March 1994
12	The Neemod	An uncontrollable monster called Neemod is unleashed heading towards the Dreamstone. Using a sunshine bubble, Rufus and Amberley lure it back to Viltheed and overload it with a Sunshine Bubble, destroying it.	25 March 1994
13	Mr Blossom's Present	The Urpneys use a spying device in the Land of Dreams. Using the information they hear, Frizz is substituted for a birthday present. Having failed, the Urpneys return to Viltheed with the present is a seed which grows into a Giant Venus Flytrap.	8 April 1994

== Series 4 (1995) ==
#	Episode Title	Summary	Air Date
1	Auntie Again	During another chase with the Dreamstone, the Urpneys detour around Tempus Fugit involving Urpgor's Auntie who connives with her nephew to steal the stone for herself. The pursuing Noops are slowed down by Auntie's booby traps.	3 January 1995
2	The Substitute	The Urpneys trick the Dreammaker into leaving with an imitation device and have Zarag take his place. Zarag corrupts the dream bottles and makes off with the Dreamstone casing unaware the Noops still have the Dreamstone.	10 January 1995
3	The Stowaways	During preparations for a mission, a couple of Wottles accidentally stowaway in Blob's Whirleyped. Rufus and Amberley sneak around Viltheed to rescue the two Wottles then hitch a ride on the Whirleyped to return home.	17 January 1995
4	Trouble with the Miners	A big freeze hits Viltheed. Fire Rock is needed to power the Urpneys' boiler. Blob's men are sent to the mines to try and bargain with its rather imposing residents, with Rufus and Amberley getting caught in the middle.	24 January 1995
5	The Basilic	A comet passes by the Isle of Catastrophe, awakening a Basilisc that has the power to turn paralyze anyone. The Urpneys try to use it against the Dreammaker, but he uses a mirror to render the Basilisc paralyzed.	31 January 1995
6	Dreambubble Mixture	As Zordrak rests for two weeks, the Urpneys take a bus to the swamps. Rufus and Amberley go to the underground supply canal to get some Dreambubble Mixture. The canal becomes an amusement ride for the Urpneys.	7 February 1995
7	Little Urpip	Urpgor's mischievous niece Urpip pays Viltheed a visit. Rufus and Amberley assist Mr Blossom, accidentally breaking his glasses. Urpgor dresses Urpip up in a Noop costume, then she ends up in the Land of Dreams and steals the Dreamstone. The Urpneys go to get her back, but Rufus and Amberley mistake it for a kidnap and go to the rescue.	14 February 1995
8	Horrible Argorrible	Zordrak creates a solid Argorrible and sends it to the land of dreams, destroying the Dreammaker's house to obtain the Dreamstone. Urpgor and the Urpneys try and stop the Argorrible from replacing them.	21 February 1995
9	Hod	An Urpney rocket lands on top of a huge spaceship belonging to a travelling Noop Dreammaker called Hod. Rufus and Amberley have to help with his problems.	28 February 1995
10	The Jolly Bird	Urpgor sends Blob on a quest, as does Rufus and Amberley both after the same thing; a Jolly Bird feather. The Urpneys manage to get a sample of the mineral, but find it has a very limited power life.	7 March 1995
11	Planet Prunus	Rufus and Amberley go to Planet Prunus to get a new Daisyapple tree for the Dreammaker, but are followed by the Urpneys, thinking that they have the Dreamstone.	14 March 1995
12	The SpiderMobile	Urpgor invents a superweapon that can shoot webs. The SpiderMobile manages gets past the Wutts and Noops and steals The Dreamstone. What a struggle it must have been to stop Zordrak from going to the Planet of Doom.	21 March 1995
13	Urpjaws	Urpgor invents a device for Zordrak to see into another's mind. The Urpneys to go and suck up the Noops at the regatta in order to steal the Dreamstone. On their way through the Sea of Destruction, they are chased by an angry Octopus for disturbing its magic sand, but has given Rufus and Amberley the chance to get the magic sand in order to save the Planet Dreamstone from its wounds caused by a meteorite shower. Sgt Blob and his men return successfully with The Dreamstone, and Zordrak send his Argorribles to the Land of Dreams, but realise that The Dreamstone was only made by The Dreammaker's imagination. Rufus and Amberly have gone to the Planet Dreamstone also to recharge The Dreamstone, in which when they come back, The Dreammaker repels the Argorribles. Back in Viltheed, Zordrak attempts to get into The Dreammaker's mind with the mind reading device, but Urpgor accidentally gets caught in its charge.	28 March 1995
