= List of The X Factor (British TV series) episodes =

The X Factor is a British reality television music competition created by Simon Cowell, beginning in 2004 and ending in 2018.

== Series 1 ==
Episode	Air date	Official ITV1 rating (millions)	Weekly rank (millions)
Auditions 1	4 September	5.25	21
Auditions 2	11 September	6.53	17
Auditions 3	18 September	7.08	14
Auditions 4	25 September	7.24	16
Auditions 5	2 October	6.71	18
Bootcamp 1	9 October	6.69	21
Bootcamp 2	9 October	7.89	17
Judges' houses	16 October	7.32	17
Live show 1	23 October	7.18	17
Live results 1	23 October	7.83	15
Live show 2	30 October	6.53	20
Live results 2	30 October	7.26	17
Live show 3	6 November	6.89	19
Live results 3	6 November	7.02	18
Live show 4	13 November	7.42	15
Live results 4	13 November	6.88	18
Live show 5	20 November	7.91	16
Live results 5	20 November	7.98	14
Live show 6	27 November	8.06	22
Live results 6	27 November	8.01	23
Live semi-final	4 December	7.79	20
Live results 7	4 December	7.52	23
Final	11 December	8.62	15
Final results	11 December	9.96	8

== Series 2 ==
Episode	Air date	Official ITV1 rating	Weekly rank
Auditions 1	20 August	6.72	13
Auditions 2	27 August	7.48	10
Auditions 3	3 September	7.75	9
Auditions 4	10 September	7.29	12
Auditions 5	17 September	9.79	5
Auditions 6	24 September	10.04	8
Bootcamp 1	1 October	8.93	9
Bootcamp 2	1 October	8.96	8
Judges' houses 1	8 October	9.09	10
Judges' houses 2	8 October	9.96	7
Live show 1	15 October	7.87	14
Live results 1	15 October	8.96	11
Live show 2	22 October	8.47	12
Live results 2	22 October	9.02	8
Live show 3	29 October	8.60	9
Live results 3	29 October	9.52	6
Live show 4	5 November	7.76	13
Live results 4	5 November	7.51	14
Live show 5	12 November	9.09	10
Live results 5	12 November	8.99	12
Live show 6	19 November	8.95	12
Live results 6	19 November	8.76	13
Live show 7	26 November	8.45	21
Live results 7	26 November	9.13	14
Live show 8	3 December	10.00	9
Live results 8	3 December	8.95	18
Live show 9	10 December	7.80	16
Live results 9	10 December	8.48	14
Live final	17 December	9.65	7
Live final results	17 December	9.90	6

== Series 3 ==
Episode	Air date	Official ITV1 rating	Weekly rank
Auditions 1	19 August	7.45	7
Auditions 2	26 August	7.36	10
Auditions 3	2 September	9.08	5
Auditions 4	9 September	7.96	7
Auditions 5	16 September	7.53	8
Auditions 6	23 September	9.17	6
Bootcamp 1	30 September	6.39	16
Bootcamp 2	30 September	8.76	7
Judges' houses 1	7 October	6.77	14
Judges' houses 2	7 October	8.95	6
Live show 1	14 October	7.52	12
Results 1	14 October	7.38	13
Live show 2	21 October	7.54	14
Results 2	21 October	7.70	13
Live show 3	28 October	7.10	14
Results 3	28 October	7.52	12
Live show 4	4 November	7.30	14
Results 4	4 November	7.91	13
Live show 5	11 November	9.83	6
Results 5	11 November	8.24	12
Live show 6	18 November	9.22	7
Results 6	18 November	8.80	9
Live show 7	25 November	8.46	11
Results 7	25 November	8.69	9
Live show 8	2 December	9.31	8
Results 8	2 December	8.24	13
Live show 9	9 December	8.39	7
Results 9	9 December	8.25	10
Live final	16 December	10.52	4
Live final results	16 December	10.78	3

== Series 4 ==
Episode	Air date	Official ITV1 rating	Weekly rank
Auditions 1	18 August	9.78	1
Auditions 2	25 August	8.88	3
Auditions 3	1 September	9.23	1
Auditions 4	8 September	8.76	4
Auditions 5	15 September	7.23	5
Auditions 6	22 September	8.34	5
Bootcamp 1	29 September	6.42	14
Bootcamp 2	29 September	7.12	10
Judges' houses 1	6 October	8.08	7
Judges' houses 2	7 October	7.92	8
Live show 1	20 October	6.60	17
Live results 1	20 October	7.02	14
Live show 2	27 October	7.51	13
Live results 2	27 October	7.51	12
Live show 3	3 November	8.47	8
Live results 3	3 November	6.99	13
Live show 4	10 November	9.18	7
Live results 4	10 November	8.59	8
Live show 5	17 November	9.15	7
Live results 5	17 November	8.05	9
Live show 6	24 November	9.30	6
Live results 6	24 November	8.88	7
Live show 7	1 December	9.56	6
Live results 7	1 December	7.82	13
Live semi-final	8 December	9.83	6
Live semi-final results	8 December	9.62	7
Live final	15 December	11.78	2
Live final results	15 December	12.23	1

== Series 5 ==
Episode	Air date	Official ITV1 rating	Weekly rank	Share
Auditions 1	16 August	10.78	1	48.2%
Auditions 2	23 August	10.10	1	45.4%
Auditions 3	30 August	8.80	2	43.5%
Auditions 4	6 September	9.57	1	42.8%
Auditions 5	13 September	9.96	1	43.2%
Auditions 6	20 September	10.01	1	41.7%
Bootcamp 1	27 September	8.94	4	36.0%
Bootcamp 2	28 September	9.47	1	38.1%
Judges' houses 1	4 October	10.84	1	40.5%
Judges' houses 2	5 October	10.11	3	42.7%
Live show 1	11 October	11.09	1	44.1%
Results 1	11 October	9.05	7	40.8%
Live show 2	18 October	10.21	3	38.5%
Results 2	18 October	9.13	9	39.7%
Live show 3	25 October	10.37	2	39.7%
Results 3	25 October	8.89	10	38.0%
Live show 4	1 November	11.65	1	43.3%
Results 4	1 November	9.72	6	37.6%
Live show 5	8 November	10.72	2	42.6%
Results 5	8 November	9.46	7	35.6%
Live show 6	15 November	11.28	1	43.5%
Results 6	15 November	10.62	2	42.9%
Live show 7	22 November	11.77	1	43.2%
Results 7	22 November	9.98	6	41.1%
Live show 8	29 November	12.67	1	46.0%
Results 8	29 November	11.41	2	50.0%
Semi-final	6 December	10.30	3	39.1%
Semi-final results	6 December	10.60	2	39.6%
Final performances	13 December	13.77	2	50.3%
Final results	13 December	14.06	1	54.4%
Series average	2008	10.51	N/A	42.4%

== Series 6 ==
Episode	Air date	Official ITV rating	Weekly rank	Share
Auditions 1	22 August	11.00	1	47.9%
Auditions 2	29 August	10.81	1	47.1%
Auditions 3	5 September	12.84	1	51.9%
Auditions 4	12 September	11.31	1	51.7%
Auditions 5	19 September	10.57	2	38.0%
Auditions 6	20 September	11.37	1	41.4%
Bootcamp 1	26 September	10.39	2	36.6%
Bootcamp 2	27 September	11.86	1	42.5%
Judges' houses 1	3 October	11.46	2	38.9%
Judges' houses 2	4 October	13.35	1	44.9%
Live show 1	10 October	12.64	2	43.8%
Results show 1	11 October	13.82	1	46.4%
Live show 2	17 October	12.07	2	42.1%
Results show 2	18 October	13.89	1	46.7%
Live show 3	24 October	12.80	2	44.1%
Results show 3	25 October	14.02	1	47.9%
Live show 4	31 October	11.74	2	42.3%
Results show 4	1 November	14.52	1	47.8%
Live show 5	7 November	13.05	2	46.9%
Results show 5	8 November	15.00	1	49.4%
Live show 6	14 November	13.45	2	45.1%
Results show 6	15 November	15.02	1	47.9%
Live show 7	21 November	14.03	2	48.6%
Results show 7	22 November	14.51	1	46.5%
Live show 8	28 November	13.46	2	47.8%
Results 8	29 November	14.34	1	45.9%
Live semi-final	5 December	13.40	2	49.5%
Live semi-final results	6 December	13.55	1	46.2%
Top 3	12 December	13.34	2	48.0%
Top 2	13 December	16.28	1	53.2%
Series average	2009	13.00	N/A	45.9%

== Series 7 ==
Episode	Date	Official ITV1 rating (millions)	Weekly rank	Share (%)	Official ITV1 HD rating (millions)	Total viewers (millions)
Auditions 1	21 August	11.88	1	48.6	0.57	12.45
Auditions 2	28 August	10.81	1	44.9	0.55	11.36
Auditions 3	4 September	11.69	1	49.2	0.64	12.33
Auditions 4	11 September	11.78	1	45.0	0.56	12.34
Auditions 5	18 September	11.65	2	46.0	0.68	12.33
Auditions 6	19 September	12.15	1	42.8	0.71	12.86
Bootcamp 1	25 September	12.07	2	46.4	0.71	12.78
Bootcamp 2	26 September	13.26	1	44.4	0.82	14.08
Judges' houses 1	2 October	12.68	2	47.3	0.82	13.50
Judges' houses 2	3 October	14.51	1	48.5	0.90	15.41
Live show 1	9 October	12.62	2	48.5	0.91	13.53
Results 1	10 October	13.17	1	46.3	0.90	14.07
Live show 2	16 October	12.14	2	47.2	0.97	13.11
Results 2	17 October	13.42	1	46.7	0.90	14.32
Live show 3	23 October	12.39	2	47.5	0.95	13.34
Results 3	24 October	13.73	1	47.7	0.95	14.68
Live show 4	30 October	12.69	2	47.1	0.81	13.50
Results 4	31 October	13.74	1	47.5	0.93	14.67
Live show 5	6 November	12.50	2	47.7	1.11	13.61
Results 5	7 November	14.29	1	49.7	1.07	15.36
Live show 6	13 November	13.61	2	49.9	0.99	14.60
Results 6	14 November	14.69	1	47.7	1.06	15.75
Live show 7	20 November	13.28	2	48.7	1.13	14.41
Results 7	21 November	15.04	1	50.0	1.09	16.13
Live show 8	27 November	13.57	2	49.0	1.09	14.66
Results 8	28 November	14.42	1	48.7	1.05	15.47
Live show 9	4 December	13.73	2	48.4	1.22	14.95
Results 9	5 December	14.53	1	48.6	0.99	15.52
Final part 1	11 December	13.94	4	52.6	1.17	15.11
Final part 2	12 December	16.55	1	54.9	1.16	17.71
Series average	2010	13.22	—N/a	47.9	0.85	14.13
