= List of Everything's Rosie episodes =

This is a list of episodes of the animated TV series Everything's Rosie.

== Series overview ==
Season	Episodes	Originally released	
Season	Episodes	First released	Last released
1	26	May 3, 2010	June 28, 2010
2	26	May 23, 2011	July 18, 2011
3	26	June 18, 2012	March 30, 2013
4	26	March 2, 2015	February 14, 2017

== Episodes ==
=== Pilot (2008) ===
No.	Title	Original release date
0	"Pilot"	2008

=== Series 1 (2010) ===
No. overall	No. in series	Title	Original release date
1	1	"How to Hide an Oak Tree"	3 May 2010 (Note: This episode was released early at MIPCOM 2009 on September 21, 2009.)
2	2	"Ala-Kalama-Kazagaza-Zoom"	4 May 2010
3	3	"How Will Got His Wings"	5 May 2010
4	4	"How to Teach a Bear to Meet the Queen"	6 May 2010
5	5	"From Little Acorns Great Oakleys Will Sleep"	7 May 2010
6	6	"The Curious Story of Holly and the Four Bears"	10 May 2010
7	7	"Raggles the Reporter"	11 May 2010
8	8	"Things That Go Glug in the Night"	12 May 2010
9	9	"Little Bear"	13 May 2010
10	10	"The Mystery of the Four Feathers"	14 May 2010
11	11	"How Rosie Mislaid Her Raggles"	17 May 2010
12	12	"How Holly Got Her Groove Back"	18 May 2010
13	13	"The Slowest Race That Ever There Was"	19 May 2010
14	14	"Bossy Bluebird"	20 May 2010
15	15	"The Call of the Wild"	21 May 2010
16	16	"Oakley and the Big Sneeze"	24 May 2010
17	17	"Skipping Bears, Talking Trees and Knitted Nests"	25 May 2010
18	18	"Looking After Little Bear"	26 May 2010
19	19	"Superwill"	27 May 2010
20	20	"When Did You Last See Your Nest?"	28 May 2010
21	21	"The Greatest Show In The Garden"	21 June 2010
22	22	"It's Time to Let It Go Little Bear"	22 June 2010
23	23	"The Last Snowball"	23 June 2010
24	24	"Whoops!"	24 June 2010
25	25	"Rosie's Swap Shop"	25 June 2010
26	26	"How To Catch an Echo"	28 June 2010

=== Series 2 (2011) ===
No. overall	No. in series	Title	Original release date
27	1	"How to Give Away Your Toys and Keep Them"	23 May 2011
28	2	"Never Play Tennis with an Egg"	24 May 2011
29	3	"Let's All Go to the Fluffy Bug Ball"	25 May 2011
30	4	"Big Bear's Little Café"	26 May 2011
31	5	"Bubble Trouble"	27 May 2011
32	6	"Holly to the Rescue"	30 May 2011
33	7	"Follow That Cloud"	31 May 2011
34	8	"The Flying Featherettes"	1 June 2011
35	9	"Big Bear in a Spin"	2 June 2011
36	10	"The Time Travelling Tree"	3 June 2011
37	11	"Raggles' Stupendous Breakfast Treat"	6 June 2011
38	12	"The Art of Rubbish"	7 June 2011
39	13	"Pirate Treasure"	8 June 2011
40	14	"Bluebird and the Tootleplinks"	9 June 2011
41	15	"Big Bear's Big Wobble"	10 June 2011
42	16	"The Little Girl Who Wanted to Be a Tree"	4 July 2011
43	17	"Legend of the Red Panda"	5 July 2011
44	18	"Reaching for the Moon"	6 July 2011
45	19	"Now You See Me, Now You Don't"	7 July 2011
46	20	"Welcome to the Hotel Oakley"	8 July 2011
47	21	"Raggles Gets the Blues"	11 July 2011
48	22	"Wheels, Wings and Crawly Things"	12 July 2011
Bluebird's friend Teal has come to play, Bluebird "crashes" onto the trampoline and then has a fear of flying. What can they do to help her face her fears?
49	23	"Will and the Dragon"	13 July 2011
50	24	"Racetrack Rosie"	14 July 2011
51	25	"The Great Outdoors"	15 July 2011
52	26	"Battle of the Ragglebots"	18 July 2011

=== Series 3 (2012–2013) ===
No. overall	No. in series	Title	Original release date
53	1	"It Came From Up There"	18 June 2012
54	2	"Water, Water Everywhere"	19 June 2012
55	3	"Me and My Shadow"	20 June 2012
56	4	"Little Lessons"	21 June 2012
57	5	"A Harvest Harmony"	22 June 2012
58	6	"Oakley's Special Delivery"	25 June 2012
59	7	"Mamma Raggles"	26 June 2012
60	8	"Snap Happy Will"	27 June 2012
61	9	"Holly Wraps It Up"	28 June 2012
62	10	"When Dinosaurs Roamed the Garden"	29 June 2012
63	11	"A Right Royal Mess"	26 November 2012
64	12	"Somewhere Under the Rainbow"	27 November 2012
65	13	"Close Encounters of the Fairy Kind"	28 November 2012
66	14	"The Elephant in the Room"	29 November 2012
67	15	"Mini Beast Safari"	30 November 2012
68	16	"Storm in a Tea Cup"	3 December 2012
69	17	"A Tall Story"	4 December 2012
70	18	"The Surprise Surprise"	5 December 2012
71	19	"Around the World in a Day"	6 December 2012
72	20	"Twinkle, Twinkle"	7 December 2012
73	21	"The Abominable Snow Bear"	7 December 2012
74	22	"The Incredible Vanishing Bees"	25 March 2013
75	23	"Can I Have My Voice Back Please?"	26 March 2013
76	24	"Space Hippo's Secret Mission"	27 March 2013
77	25	"Making Mountains Out of Mysteries"	29 March 2013
78	26	"Message in a Bozberry Bottle"	30 March 2013

=== Special (2014) ===
No. overall	No. in series	Title	Original release date
79	1	"When You Wish Upon an Oak"	1 January 2014

=== Series 4 (2015–2017) ===
No. overall	No. in series	Title	Original release date
80	1	"The Wind That Shakes the Plum Tree"	2 March 2015
81	2	"Life Beneath the Waves"	3 March 2015
82	3	"Holly's Home From Home"	4 March 2015
83	4	"The Great Jumping Joke"	5 March 2015
84	5	"The Raggles Express"	6 March 2015
85	6	"Codebreakers"	9 March 2015
86	7	"The Licky Sticky Friend"	10 March 2015
87	8	"Big Bear's Brumba"	11 March 2015
88	9	"The Book of Lost and Found"	12 March 2015
89	10	"Twigs, Camera, Action!"	13 March 2015
90	11	"Will's Magic Moment"	16 March 2015
91	12	"Try Something New Day"	17 March 2015
92	13	"From Pole to Goal"	18 March 2015
93	14	"Across the Universe"	19 March 2015
94	15	"Will at the Wheel"	20 March 2015
95	16	"Full of Beans"	23 March 2015
96	17	"Wakey, Wakey"	24 March 2015
97	18	"When the Boat Comes In"	25 March 2015
98	19	"Zip Zap Zip"	26 March 2015
99	20	"The Silliest Scarecrow"	3 January 2017
100	21	"Here We Go Gathering Nuts All Day"	10 January 2017
101	22	"Four Seasons in One Day"	17 January 2017
102	23	"The Very Precious Surprise"	24 January 2017
103	24	"Journey to the Centre of the Earth"	31 January 2017
104	25	"The Art of Being Big Bear"	7 February 2017
105	26	"Blooming Lovely"	14 February 2017
