= List of Off Their Rockers episodes =

This is an episode list for Off Their Rockers, a British television series. There have been 13 episodes aired over 2 series, with a third series of 9 episodes airing in 2015.

== Series overview ==
Series	Episodes	Originally aired		Popularity (ave. viewers) (millions)
Series	Episodes	Series premiere	Series finale	Popularity (ave. viewers) (millions)
1	6	7 April 2013	12 May 2013	4.46
2	7	6 April 2014	18 May 2014	3.40
3	9	1 March 2015	2015	TBD

== Episodes ==
=== Series 1 ===
The first series consisted of six episodes and ran from 7 April until 12 May 2013.

Title	Original airdate	Ratings (millions)	ITV Weekly Rank
"Episode 1"	7 April 2013	4.79	15
In this first episode, a nun wreaks havoc on a mobility scooter, a pensioner seeks advice on who should inherit her cash, and a beautician deals with a surprising enquiry about vajazzling.
"Episode 2"	14 April 2013	5.26	15
This week a pensioner asks for help when his wheelchair gets clamped, while another looks for someone to join her for a spot of snake charming.
"Episode 3"	21 April 2013	4.68	17
One OAP attempts escapology for the first time, another fails his Zimmer frame walking test, and a parachuting pensioner drops out of a tree
"Episode 4"	28 April 2013	4.45	16
A Rocker tries to park her mobility scooter between two unfortunate cars, and an elderly couple ask a mobile phone salesman for help with Angry Birds.
"Episode 5"	5 May 2013	3.44	20
A Rocker decides to audition for Britain's Got Talent while another learns what it means to be on Twitter.
"Episode 6"	12 May 2013	4.15	18
A Rocker needs help when her hearing aid breaks, while another has to be moved around in a supermarket trolley when her wheelchair is stolen.

=== Series 2 ===
After a successful run in 2013, a second series was commissioned. The second series consisted of seven episodes and ran from 6 April until 18 May 2014.

Title	Original airdate	Ratings (millions)	ITV Weekly Rank
"Episode 1"	6 April 2014	4.01	17
A trip to the vet ends in an unusual cat fight and the act of helping an OAP across the road is taken to a whole new level.
"Episode 2"	13 April 2014	3.82	18
A Rocker performs a daredevil escape from an OAP home, Rosemary needs help to locate her pet dog Nigel and Sonia has a quick nap on a nice comfy shoulder.
"Episode 3"	20 April 2014	3.31	17
Velma gets racy in a photo booth, Seb needs a fright to cure his hiccups and Rosemary eats some funny-tasting biscuits
"Episode 4"	27 April 2014	3.37	20
Seb needs a sponge bath, Rosie loses her rather unusual pet and Tony tries to prove that there is such a thing as a free meal.
"Episode 5"	4 May 2014	3.10	19
Seb takes a shower in an unexpected place, Rosie and Marry try out an unusual selling technique and Sonia gets in trouble with the law again.
"Episode 6"	11 May 2014	3.29	15
Seb gets tied to a lamppost, Rosie strips to reveal rather unusual undergarments and Sonia's sat-nav has a mind of its own
"Episode 7"	18 May 2014	2.90	17
This episode was made to celebrate the life of Iris Sharples, who is deceased.

=== Series 3 ===
After a successful run in 2014, a third series was commissioned on 7 August 2014. The series began airing on 1 March 2015 for nine episodes.

Title	Original airdate	Ratings (millions)	ITV Weekly Rank
"Episode 1"	1 March 2015	3.31	18
Rosemary is on the look out for one last man to break her marriage vows for - and asks some unsuspecting young girls for their opinion. But will she go with their celebrity suggestions or opt for the well presented OAP that's coming her way? Meanwhile, Seb is trying to sell cheap suits.
"Episode 2"	8 March 2015	3.22	18
This week features a potty mouthed nun, Seb gets advice on attending a naturist wedding and Dave gives a member of the public his lucky pants.
