= List of The Avengers (radio series) episodes =

This is a list of known episodes of The Avengers radio series, broadcast between 6 December 1971 and 28 December 1973 on Springbok Radio, a commercial service of the South African Broadcasting Corporation. By contrast with the 1965–69 seasons of the British television series from which the series was adapted by Tony Jay and Denis Folbigge, the character Emma Peel occurs throughout.

Episodes with surviving recordings
Springbok Radio Title	Broadcast Dates	Personnel	Original TV Title	Original TV Broadcast
Escape in Time (5 episodes)	6-10 Dec. 1971	Donald Monat – John Steed; Diane Appleby – Emma Peel; Hugh Rouse – Narrator; Tony Jay – writer, director David Gooden – producer	Escape in Time (Steed & Peel)	27 Jan. 1967
The Fantasy Game (7 episodes)	28 Mar.-5 Apr. 1972	Donald Monat – John Steed; Diane Appleby – Emma Peel; Hugh Rouse – Narrator; Rex Garner – Arkadi; Bruce Millar – Prince Ali; Kerry Jordan – Grand Vizier; Tony Jay – writer, director David Gooden – producer	Honey for the Prince (Steed & Peel)	22 Mar. 1966
The Quick-Quick-Slow Death (7 episodes)	19–26 May 1972	Donald Monat – John Steed; Diane Appleby – Emma Peel; Hugh Rouse – Narrator; Denis Folbigge – writer, director David Gooden – producer	Quick-Quick-Slow Death (Steed & Peel)	4 Feb. 1966
Love All (6 episodes)	29 May-5 Jun. 1972	Donald Monat – John Steed; Diane Appleby – Emma Peel; Hugh Rouse – Narrator; Stuart Brown – Mother; Denis Folbigge – writer, director David Gooden – producer	Love All (Steed & King)	19 Feb. 1968
Get-A-Way! (6 episodes)	6-13 Jun. 1972	Donald Monat – John Steed; Diane Appleby – Emma Peel; Hugh Rouse – Narrator; Denis Folbigge – writer, director David Gooden – producer	Get-A-Way! (Steed & King)	19 Feb. 1969
A Deadly Gift (6 episodes)	14-21 Jun. 1972	Donald Monat – John Steed; Diane Appleby – Emma Peel; Hugh Rouse – Narrator; Denis Folbigge – writer, director David Gooden – producer	The Cybernauts (Steed & Peel)	14 Oct. 1965
Super Secret Cypher Snatch (6 episodes)	22-29 Jun. 1972	Donald Monat – John Steed; Diane Appleby – Emma Peel; Hugh Rouse – Narrator; Colin Fish – Mother; Denis Folbigge – writer, director David Gooden – producer	Super Secret Cypher Snatch (Steed & King)	9 Oct. 1968
Dial A Deadly Number (6 episodes)	30 Jun.-7 Jul. 1972	Donald Monat – John Steed; Diane Appleby – Emma Peel; Hugh Rouse – Narrator; Colin Fish – Mother; Denis Folbigge – writer, director David Gooden – producer	Dial A Deadly Number (Steed & Peel)	3 Dec. 1965
Not To Be Sneezed At (7 episodes)	10-18 Jul. 1972	Donald Monat – John Steed; Diane Appleby – Emma Peel; Hugh Rouse – Narrator; Anthony Fridjhon – Mother; Denis Folbigge – writer, director David Gooden – producer	You'll Catch Your Death (Steed & King)	7 Oct. 1968
Who Shot Poor George/ XR40? (7 episodes)	28 Jul.-7 Aug. 1972	Donald Monat – John Steed; Diane Appleby – Emma Peel; Hugh Rouse – Narrator; Denis Folbigge – writer, director David Gooden – producer	Whoever Shot Poor George Oblique Stroke XR40? (Steed & King)	30 Oct. 1968
A Grave Charge (6 episodes)	8-15 Aug. 1972	Donald Monat – John Steed; Diane Appleby – Emma Peel; Hugh Rouse – Narrator; Colin Fish – Mother; Denis Folbigge – writer, director David Gooden – producer	Bizarre (Steed & King)	21 May 1969
All Done With Mirrors (7 episodes)	16-24 Aug. 1972	Donald Monat – John Steed; Diane Appleby – Emma Peel; Hugh Rouse – Narrator; Colin Fish – Mother; Denis Folbigge – writer, director David Gooden – producer	All Done With Mirrors (Steed & King)	13 Nov. 1968
The Morning After (6 episodes)	25 Aug.-1 Sep. 1972	Donald Monat – John Steed; Diane Appleby – Emma Peel; Hugh Rouse – Narrator; Denis Folbigge – writer, director David Gooden – producer	The Morning After (Steed & King)	5 Nov. 1968
The Joker (6 episodes)	4-11 Sep. 1972	Donald Monat – John Steed; Diane Appleby – Emma Peel; Hugh Rouse – Narrator; Denis Folbigge – writer, director David Gooden – producer	The Joker (Steed & Peel)	28 Apr. 1967
Straight from the Shoulder (6 episodes)	12-19 Sep. 1972	Donald Monat – John Steed; Diane Appleby – Emma Peel; Hugh Rouse – Narrator; Denis Folbigge – writer, director David Gooden – producer	Have Guns – Will Haggle (Steed & King)	11 Dec. 1968
Stop Me If You've Heard This (6 episodes)	20-27 Sep. 1972	Donald Monat – John Steed; Diane Appleby – Emma Peel; Hugh Rouse – Narrator; Denis Folbigge – writer, director David Gooden – producer	Look – (Stop Me If You've Heard This One) But There Were These Two Fellers... (Steed & King)	11 Dec. 1968
From Venus With Love (6 episodes)	28 Sep.-5 Oct. 1972	Donald Monat – John Steed; Diane Appleby – Emma Peel; Hugh Rouse – Narrator; Denis Folbigge – writer, director David Gooden – producer	From Venus with Love (Steed & Peel)	13 Jan. 1967
A Case of Interrogation (7 episodes)	Unknown	Donald Monat – John Steed; Diane Appleby – Emma Peel; Hugh Rouse – Narrator; Colin Fish – Mother; Denis Folbigge – writer, director David Gooden – producer	The Interrogators (Steed & King)	1 Jan. 1969
Too Many Olés (6 episodes)	Unknown	Donald Monat – John Steed; Diane Appleby – Emma Peel; Hugh Rouse – Narrator; Colin Fish – Mother; Denis Folbigge – writer, director David Gooden – producer	They Keep Killing Steed (Steed & King)	18 Dec. 1968
Train of Events (6 episodes)	Unknown	Donald Monat – John Steed; Diane Appleby – Emma Peel; Hugh Rouse – Narrator; Colin Fish – Mother; Denis Folbigge – writer, director David Gooden – producer	A Funny Thing Happened on the Way to the Station (Steed & Peel)	14 April 1967

+ Episodes with no surviving recordings
Springbok Radio Title	Broadcast Dates	Personnel	Original TV Title	Original TV Broadcast
The Return of the Ripper (5 episodes)	13-17 Dec. 1971	Donald Monat – John Steed; Diane Appleby – Emma Peel; Hugh Rouse – Narrator; Tony Jay – writer, director David Gooden – producer	Fog (Steed & King)	12 Mar. 1969
Pandora (6 episodes)	20-27 Jul. 1972	Donald Monat – John Steed; Diane Appleby – Emma Peel; Hugh Rouse – Narrator; Colin Fish – Mother; Denis Folbigge – writer, director David Gooden – producer	Pandora (Steed & King)	30 Apr. 1969
Take Me to Your Leader (7 episodes)	13-23 Oct. 1972	Donald Monat – John Steed; Diane Appleby – Emma Peel; Hugh Rouse – Narrator; Denis Folbigge – writer, director David Gooden – producer	Take Me to Your Leader (Steed & King)	29 Nov. 1968

+ Episodes with no surviving recordings or detail
The Correct Way to Kill	Can You Ever Trust A Woman?	The Curious Case of the Countless Clues
The Rotters	Split!	A Sense of History
Force of Evil	The £50,000 Breakfast	Who's Who?
Wish You Were Here	Killer	

== See also ==
- The Avengers radio series
