= List of RuPaul's Drag Race UK episodes =

RuPaul's Drag Race UK is a British reality competition streaming television series based on the American television series of the same name. The television series is produced by World of Wonder for the BBC. The show premiered on the BBC's web streaming service BBC Three on 3 October 2019. The show is distributed internationally on the streaming service WOW Presents Plus. RuPaul's Drag Race UK documents RuPaul in his search for "UK's next drag superstar.

== Series overview ==
| Series | Episodes | Originally released | |
| Series | Episodes | First released | Last released |
|---|---|---|---|
| 1 | 8 | 3 October 2019 | 21 November 2019 |
| 2 | 10 | 14 January 2021 | 18 March 2021 |
| 3 | 10 | 23 September 2021 | 25 November 2021 |
| 4 | 10 | 22 September 2022 | 24 November 2022 |
| 5 | 10 | 28 September 2023 | 30 November 2023 |
| 6 | 10 | 26 September 2024 | 28 November 2024 |
| 7 | 10 | 25 September 2025 | 27 November 2025 |
| 8 | 10 | 3 September 2026 | 5 November 2026 |

== Episodes ==
=== Series 1 (2019) ===
| No. overall | No. in series | Title | Original release date |
|---|---|---|---|
| 1 | 1 | "The Royal Queens" | 3 October 2019 |
| 2 | 2 | "Downton Draggy" | 10 October 2019 |
| 3 | 3 | "Posh on a Penny" | 17 October 2019 |
| 4 | 4 | "Snatch Game" | 24 October 2019 |
| 5 | 5 | "Girl Groups Battle Royale" | 31 October 2019 |
| 6 | 6 | "Thirsty Werk" | 7 November 2019 |
| 7 | 7 | "Family That Drags Together" | 14 November 2019 |
| 8 | 8 | "Grand Finale" | 21 November 2019 |

=== Series 2 (2021) ===
| No. overall | No. in series | Title | Original release date |
|---|---|---|---|
| 9 | 1 | "Royalty Returns" | 14 January 2021 |
| 10 | 2 | "Rats: The Rusical" | 21 January 2021 |
| 11 | 3 | "Who Wore It Best?" | 28 January 2021 |
| 12 | 4 | "Morning Glory" | 4 February 2021 |
| 13 | 5 | "The RuRuvision Song Contest" | 11 February 2021 |
| 14 | 6 | "Snatch Game" | 18 February 2021 |
| 15 | 7 | "Lockdown Supersheroes" | 25 February 2021 |
| 16 | 8 | "Stoned on the Runway" | 4 March 2021 |
| 17 | 9 | "BeastEnders" | 11 March 2021 |
| 18 | 10 | "Grand Finale" | 18 March 2021 |

=== Series 3 (2021) ===
| No. overall | No. in series | Title | Original release date |
|---|---|---|---|
| 19 | 1 | "The Return of Royalty" | 23 September 2021 |
| 20 | 2 | "Dragoton" | 30 September 2021 |
| 21 | 3 | "Great Outdoors" | 7 October 2021 |
| 22 | 4 | "Big Drag Energy" | 14 October 2021 |
| 23 | 5 | "Draglexa" | 21 October 2021 |
| 24 | 6 | "Snatch Game" | 28 October 2021 |
| 25 | 7 | "The Miss Fugly Beauty Pageant" | 4 November 2021 |
| 26 | 8 | "Bra Wars" | 11 November 2021 |
| 27 | 9 | "The Pearly Gates Roast" | 18 November 2021 |
| 28 | 10 | "Grand Finale" | 25 November 2021 |

=== Series 4 (2022) ===
| No. overall | No. in series | Title | Original release date |
|---|---|---|---|
| 29 | 1 | "ST4RT Your Engines" | 22 September 2022 |
| 30 | 2 | "Yass-tonbury Festival" | 29 September 2022 |
| 31 | 3 | "Naff-ta Awards" | 6 October 2022 |
| 32 | 4 | "Catty Man" | 13 October 2022 |
| 33 | 5 | "Lairy Poppins: The Rusical" | 20 October 2022 |
| 34 | 6 | "Strictly Come Snatch Game" | 27 October 2022 |
| 35 | 7 | "Queen Team Makeovers" | 3 November 2022 |
| 36 | 8 | "The Squirrel Games" | 10 November 2022 |
| 37 | 9 | "Comedy Queens" | 17 November 2022 |
| 38 | 10 | "Grand Finale" | 24 November 2022 |

=== Series 5 (2023) ===
| No. overall | No. in series | Title | Original release date |
|---|---|---|---|
| 39 | 1 | "Tickety-Boo" | 28 September 2023 |
| 40 | 2 | "Purrfect Looks" | 5 October 2023 |
| 41 | 3 | "Club Bangers" | 12 October 2023 |
| 42 | 4 | "DisasterClass" | 19 October 2023 |
| 43 | 5 | "Pant-Oh She Better Don't!: The Rusical" | 26 October 2023 |
| 44 | 6 | "Snatch Game" | 2 November 2023 |
| 45 | 7 | "Melodrama-Rama" | 9 November 2023 |
| 46 | 8 | "Hotline Makeover" | 16 November 2023 |
| 47 | 9 | "The Dragiators' Roast" | 23 November 2023 |
| 48 | 10 | "Grand Finale" | 30 November 2023 |

=== Series 6 (2024) ===
| No. overall | No. in series | Title | Original release date |
|---|---|---|---|
| 49 | 1 | "Cabaret Talent Show" | 26 September 2024 |
| 50 | 2 | "Stitch & Strut" | 3 October 2024 |
| 51 | 3 | "Brit-flicks" | 10 October 2024 |
| 52 | 4 | "Ghoul Power" | 17 October 2024 |
| 53 | 5 | "Sofa Showdown" | 24 October 2024 |
| 54 | 6 | "Snatch Game" | 31 October 2024 |
| 55 | 7 | "Pop of the Tops - Live: The Rusical" | 7 November 2024 |
| 56 | 8 | "All in the Drag Family" | 14 November 2024 |
| 57 | 9 | "Send in the Clowns" | 21 November 2024 |
| 58 | 10 | "Grand Finale" | 28 November 2024 |

=== Series 7 (2025) ===
| No. overall | No. in series | Title | Original release date |
|---|---|---|---|
| 59 | 1 | "Queens of the Brit Gala" | 25 September 2025 |
| 60 | 2 | "Rumble in the Jumble" | 2 October 2025 |
| 61 | 3 | "Battle of the Brats" | 9 October 2025 |
| 62 | 4 | "Sweety Darlings!" | 16 October 2025 |
| 63 | 5 | "Talent Ahoy!" | 23 October 2025 |
| 64 | 6 | "Peter Pansy: The Rusical" | 30 October 2025 |
| 65 | 7 | "Snatch Me Out!" | 6 November 2025 |
| 66 | 8 | "The Hun Makeover" | 13 November 2025 |
| 67 | 9 | "Comedy is a Bitch" | 20 November 2025 |
| 68 | 10 | "Sing for the Crown" | 27 November 2025 |

=== Series 8 (2026) ===
| No. overall | No. in series | Title | Original release date |
|---|---|---|---|
| 69 | 1 | "Keep Calm and Drag On" | 3 September 2026 |
| 70 | 2 | "Goodies and Baddies" | 10 September 2026 |
| 71 | 3 | "Snatch Me If You Can" | 17 September 2026 |
| 72 | 4 | "Croydon – The Rusical" | 24 September 2026 |
| 73 | 5 | "The Piggy Pageant" | 1 October 2026 |
| 74 | 6 | "Holiday Hits" | 8 October 2026 |
| 75 | 7 | "Ghost Hunties" | 15 October 2026 |
| 76 | 8 | "Relative Beauties" | 22 October 2026 |
| 77 | 9 | "The Last Laugh" | 29 October 2026 |
| 78 | 10 | "Rule Britannia" | 5 November 2026 |
