= List of The Master Game episodes =

The Master Game was a BBC production of televised chess tournaments that ran for seven series on BBC2 from 1975 to 1982.

== Series 5 (1979-1980) ==
No. in series	Title	Group	Outcome
1	"Nunn vs Hort"	A	1/2-1/2
2	"Pfleger vs Browne"	A	0-1
3	"Schmid vs Korchnoi"	B	1-0
4	"Byrne vs Stean"	B	1/2-1/2
5	"Hort vs Pfleger"	A	1-0
6	"Browne vs Nunn"	A	1/2-1/2
7	"Byrne vs Korchnoi"	B	0-1
8	"Stean vs Schmid"	B	0-1
9	"Nunn vs Pfleger"	A	1/2-1/2
10	"Hort vs Browne"	A	0-1
11	"Korchnoi vs Stean"	B	1-0
12	"Schmid vs Byrne"	B	1/2-1/2
13	"Schmid vs Browne"	Final	1-0

== Series 6 (1980-1981) ==
No. in series	Title	Group	Outcome
1	"Gligorić vs Short"	A	0-1
2	"Byrne vs Hort (Alekhine's Defence)"	A	1/2-1/2
3	"Miles vs Larsen"	B	1-0
4	"Schmid vs Donner"	B	1/2-1/2
5	"Hort vs Gligorić"	A	0-1
6	"Short vs Byrne"	A	1/2-1/2
7	"Donner vs Miles"	B	1/2-1/2
8	"Larsen vs Schmid"	B	1-0
9	"Gligorić vs Byrne"	A	1/2-1/2
10	"Short vs Hort"	A	1/2-1/2
11	"Larsen vs Donner"	B	1-0
12	"Miles vs Schmid"	B	1-0
13	"Short vs Miles"	Final	1-0

== Series 7 (1981-1982) ==
No. in series	Title	Group	Outcome
1	"Hecht vs Christiansen"	A	0-1
2	"Adorjan vs Short"	A	1/2-1/2 (This game was played but not broadcast)
3	"Keene vs Browne"	B	1/2-1/2
4	"Lobron vs Quinteros"	B	1-0
5	"Christiansen vs Adorjan"	A	1/2-1/2
6	"Short vs Hecht"	A	0-1
7	"Browne vs Lobron"	B	1/2-1/2
8	"Quinteros vs Keene"	B	1-0
9	"Christiansen vs Short"	A	0-1
10	"Hecht vs Adorjan"	A	0-1
11	"Lobron vs Keene"	B	1/2-1/2
12	"Quinteros vs Browne"	B	1/2-1/2 (This particularly interesting game was shown in two parts and was presumably why Adorjan v Short was dropped from broadcast)
13	"Adorjan vs Lobron"	Final	0-1
