= List of Celebrity Ex on the Beach episodes =

The following is a list of episodes for the a British reality television series, Celebrity Ex on the Beach that first aired on MTV on 21 January 2020.

== Series overview ==
Series	Episodes	Originally released		Location	Average viewership
Series	Episodes	First released	Last released	Location	Average viewership
1	15	21 January 2020	28 April 2020	Marbella, Spain	327,000
2	12	15 February 2022	3 May 2022	Gran Canaria, Spain	—N/a
3	10	19 March 2024	13 May 2024	Gran Canaria, Spain	—N/a
4	10	31 March 2026	2 June 2026	Tenerife	—N/a

== Episodes ==
=== Series 1 (2020) ===
No. overall	No. in season	Title	Original release date	UK viewers (thousands)	Duration
1	1	"Love at First Sight"	21 January 2020	280,000	90 minutes
2	2	"Breaking Point"	28 January 2020	348,000	60 minutes
3	3	"Will You Be My Girlfriend?"	4 February 2020	331,000	60 minutes
4	4	"May The Best Man Win"	11 February 2020	283,000	60 minutes
5	5	"Head To Head"	18 February 2020	232,000	60 minutes
6	6	"A New Celeb's In Toon!"	25 February 2020	338,000	60 minutes
7	7	"The Queen Has Arrived"	3 March 2020	344,000	60 minutes
8	8	"Battle Of The Divas"	10 March 2020	315,000	60 minutes
9	9	"Heartbreak"	17 March 2020	311,000	60 minutes
10	10	"Double Trouble"	24 March 2020	375,000	60 minutes
11	11	"Calum's Choice"	31 March 2020	358,000	60 minutes
12	12	"Miles And The Mob Wife"	7 April 2020	327,000	60 minutes
13	13	"As One Door Closes Another One Opens"	14 April 2020	344,000	60 minutes
14	14	"The Mob Wife Goes In"	21 April 2020	365,000	60 minutes
15	15	"The Finale"	28 April 2020	349,000	60 minutes

=== Series 2 (2022) ===
No. overall	No. in season	Title	Original release date	Duration
16	1	"Celeb Surprises"	15 February 2022	60 minutes
17	2	"Love Triangle"	22 February 2022	60 minutes
18	3	"SOS"	1 March 2022	60 minutes
19	4	"Secret Kisses"	8 March 2022	60 minutes
20	5	"Loose Lips"	15 March 2022	60 minutes
21	6	"True Colours"	22 March 2022	60 minutes
22	7	"Kori Gets the Hump"	29 March 2022	60 minutes
23	8	"Double Whammy"	5 April 2022	60 minutes
24	9	"Theo's 'Down Under' Dilemma"	12 April 2022	60 minutes
25	10	"The Cherry On The Cake"	19 April 2022	60 minutes
26	11	"Going Going Gone!"	26 April 2022	60 minutes
27	12	"Episode 12"	3 May 2022	60 minutes

=== Series 3 (2024) ===
No. overall	No. in season	Title	Original release date	MTV air date
28	1	"Dinner dates with a side of ex"	18 March 2024	19 March 2024
29	2	"Blindsided"	18 March 2024	19 March 2024
30	3	"I'm Gone"	25 March 2024	26 March 2024
31	4	"Love's A Bumpy Road"	1 April 2024	2 April 2024
32	5	"The Lion Ex"	8 April 2024	9 April 2024
33	6	"The Night Beach"	15 April 2024	16 April 2024
34	7	"The Only Way Is Ex"	22 April 2024	23 April 2024
35	8	"History Repeating Itself"	29 April 2024	30 April 2024
36	9	"Hanging On By A Thread"	6 May 2024	14 May 2024
37	10	"Burning Ceremony"	14 May 2024	21 May 2024

=== Series 4 (2026) ===
No. overall	No. in season	Title	Original release date
38	1	"This Could Be Trouble"	31 March 2026
39	2	"Truth Or Dare?"	7 April 2026
40	3	"Takes Two To Tango"	14 April 2026
41	4	"Storm Sophie"	21 April 2026
42	5	"In A Pickles"	28 April 2026
43	6	"Ex-Tra Terrestials Incoming"	5 May 2026
44	7	"Just In Chase"	12 May 2026
45	8	"Dani-Hell!"	19 May 2026
46	9	"Three's a Crowd"	26 May 2026
47	10	"Episode 10"	2 June 2026
