= List of Genie in the House episodes =

This is a list of episodes of Genie in the House.

== Series overview ==
Series	Episodes	Originally released	
Series	Episodes	First released	Last released
1	26	29 May 2006	7 May 2007
2	26	5 November 2007	27 May 2008
3	11	3 November 2008	5 January 2009
4	15	10 August 2009	4 December 2010

== Episodes ==
=== Series 1 (2006–07) ===
No.	Title	Original release date	Prod. code
1	"The Clones"	29 May 2006	101
Sophie and Emma have a very important Party to go to, but their father wants them to do chores instead. They wish the housework would be finished, but Adil's attempt at cleaning the kitchen goes wrong. Philip discovers the girls' subterfuge, and punishes the girls by not letting them go out. Emma persuades Sophie to try magic one more time, and they wish for doubles to their place at home while they party. Adil obliges. The clones are eager to do the housework, and Philip is very pleased, if rather bemused, by the girls' apparent change of heart. But, of course, the girls get found out. Written by Isabelle Dubernet and Eric Fuhrer. Directed by Phil Ox. This episode was originally recorded in October 2004, as a pilot for the series. Apart from obvious differences such as a different set, there were other detailed changes, including alterations to Adil's costume and make-up, between the pilot and the episode as remounted for the series.
2	"My New Best Friend"	30 May 2006	102
Sophie pretends to be ill but Emma knows she is trying to get a day off school so she Sophie explains she is being bullied at school and Philip doesn't know what to do when it is her geography teacher that's bullying her. So she turns to Adil for help (probably not the best idea she ever had) and Adil makes her teacher be her a new best friend and she won't leave Sophie alone. Meanwhile Emma wants some interesting fish so she asks Adil to make them expert swimmers but Adil says the wish wrong and turns them into expert singers. Adil gets very attached to the fish and names them Do, Ray, and Mi. Things turn to the worst for Sophie when her teacher wants to go on a date with Philip. Luckily Sophie comes up with a solution and gets Adil to redo the wish and gets her teacher to be best friends with Emma's fish.
3	"Cave Dad"	31 May 2006	103
Max, Philip's boss, is bringing a very important client for dinner, but Philip is stuck for an idea for a revolutionary new soda can design. Emma is doing her homework, and wonders if the Norton family have any famous ancestors. Her father tells her about Isambard Conquest Norton, the famous designer and engineer, so Emma decides to wish for Isambard to be brought back to life to help her with her homework. Adil brings back the wrong Norton ancestor, a cave man. And to make things worse, Philip gets knocked out, so the caveman has to take his place at the very important dinner. Written by Lee Pressman Directed by Steven Bawol.
4	"Say Cheese"	1 June 2006	104
Philip has got his laptop out, and is showing Caroline and Emma an image of himself in front of the Mona Lisa, but instead of printing off some copies he manages to delete the picture completely. Sophie has also mistakenly just deleted the only other copy of the picture from the camera. Emma persuades Sophie that they could recreate the picture, with Adil's help, so their father won't find out about Sophie's error. Adil "magics up" the Mona Lisa, and the wall on which it hangs, in the hope of persuading an unsuspecting Philip to pose in front of it. The disappearance of the Mona Lisa from the Louvre causes consternation in Paris, of course, but the girls aren't too concerned, until they need to hide the painting from Caroline. Adil hides the painting where no one will ever need to look, in the waste disposal, and the painting gets destroyed. Ever resourceful, the girls decide to bring back Leonardo Da Vinci to paint another version of the Mona Lisa. He requires paying, and his services do not come cheap, although he eventually settles for payment in Cheese Puffs, which he thinks are delicious, and Philip's Hawaiian shirt. The painting is recreated, and returned to the Louvre, after Philip has had his photograph taken in front of it. The new painting, however, is not quite the same as the old. With Joseph Long as Leonardo Da Vinci, Carl Proctor, the show's casting director, as the News Reporter and Arnold Widdowson, one of the series' regular writers, as the Police Inspector. Written by Grant Cathro. Directed by Jean-Francois Didelot.
5	"Puppy Love"	2 June 2006	105
Philip tries to get the girls to look after Uncle Max's new dog, but Emma is planning on taking Sophie on a blind date. Adil, who has been told to watch the dog, misunderstands Emma instructions on how to treat the dog, and turns the dog not into a 'good boy', but into an ordinary boy, and Sophie thinks the dog turned boy is her blind date. She also thinks he's cute. Philip and Max are appearing on the Shopping Channel, promoting the new Max Baxter Hand Spa. They have instructed Adil to phone in and order twenty five of them to get things going. He takes advantage of the channel's 'special offer', and buys the entire stock. Sophie is rather taken by her new 'boyfriend', who likes his tummy being tickled, but isn't allowed on the sofa. He also likes to go walkies, as long as there are lamp posts on the way. Emma realises what Adil has done, but she can't bring herself to tell Sophie. Meanwhile, it's discovered that the Hand Spas turn everyone's hands green, and they have to be recalled. Except that since he bought up the entire stock, Adil has saved fortuitously saved Max from ruin. Sophie eventually realises that a boyfriend who chases squirrels in the park isn't really her type, and ends their 'relationship.' Adil turns Nev back into a dog, but not necessarily the right dog. With Harry Lloyd as Nev. Written by Grant Cathro. Directed by Phil Ox.
6	"Teacher Adil"	5 June 2006	106
Sophie is struggling with her prize acceptance speech, but neither Adil or her father seem interested in helping. Emma is grumpy because she has a boring history lesson with the boring Mr. Hull. Adil gives Emma his version of the story of the French Revolution, which is far more interesting than Mr. Hull's boring version, and Emma rashly wishes that Adil were her teacher and not Mr. Hull. Sophie wishes that her father would listen to every word she utters. At school, Emma is surprised and embarrassed to find that she has a new teacher, while Sophie is embarrassed to find that her father has followed her to school to act on her every word, and she has to take him home to get Adil to reverse the wish. But Adil is back at school, and enthralling Emma's class with his story of the French Revolution, although he has to make his escape when the headmaster finds out he's not a qualified teacher. Emma and Adil return home, only to find a livid Mr. Hull is now the genie, and Adil is no longer "a brilliantly talented genie." Only the dull Mr. Hull can sort things out. With Hannah Tointon as Annabelle Scott, Philip Fox as Mr. Preston, Richard Freeman as Mr. Hull. Written by Arnold Widdowson. Directed by Phil Ox.
7	"Girlband"	6 June 2006	107
Emma discovers that there's a talent competition, and asks Sophie to form a girlband with her, convinced they'll win the competition. Sophie, though, is too nervous to get up on stage, and Adil suggests that Emma wishes that Sophie was more confident. Of course, things don't go quite right, and Sophie becomes overconfident. Too confident, in fact, and decides to enter the competition on her own. She also acquires a bodyguard and entourage. Emma has to find a new partner, and she, Caroline and Adil, hold auditions, but Adil gets carried away and turns them all away. Emma is forced to use the protesting Adil, in a dress and wig, as he is the only person who knows the routine and the song. Sophie goes onstage to perform, but Adil's confidence wish wears off just as Sophie is about to sing, and she runs from the stage. Adil, meanwhile, has lost his confidence, and Emma has to go on stage alone. Sophie joins her sister, and Adil manages to overcome his stage fright, and joins in. Adil is revealed as a boy, and they're disqualified. To cap it all, the girls Adil rejected at the audition, who got together to form their own band, win the competition. Written by Bennett Arron. Directed by Phil Ox.
8	"Daddy Cool"	7 June 2006	108
Philip is stressed because he's behind with a design for a novelty teapot for a client of Max's. The girls are pestering their dad to let them hold a party, and Adil is driving him nuts by carrying out noisy alterations to the interior of his lamp. The girls wish their father was a little more chilled, and Philip turns into a hippie. The girls are pleased because the party gets the go ahead, and all the guests are impressed with the new laid back Philip. The new Philip can't be bothered with work, so Max's client makes Max fire him, and he can't be bothered to pay the bills, either. The mortgage company forecloses on them, and all the furniture is repossessed. And even worse, he lends Adil his Power Hammer, causing Adil to injure every one of his fingers, rendering him unable to do any magic. Max's client, Mr. Osterman returns to the house to look for his organiser, which he has lost, and spots Adil's lamp. Mr. Osterman thinks it's Philips design for the novelty tea pot, and falls in love with it. Philip gets reinstated, with a large bonus, so the money problems are over, and Adil recovers to reverse the wish. With Johnnie Lyne Pirkis as Mr. Osterman. Written by Grant Cathro. Directed by Emmanuelle Dubergey. Note Mr Osterman is German, Austrian and Mr Osterman is apparently able to speak fluent German. The title of the episode is also a reference to the song by German-based Caribbean band Boney M.
9	"Cuckoo in the Lamp"	8 June 2006	109
When Emma rubs the magic lamp, a new genie appears. He says his name is Abdab and he claims to be the rightful resident of the lamp; he reveals that Adil never graduated from genie school, which is why he so often gets his spells wrong. While Emma is happy to have her wishes fulfilled correctly at last, Sophie is doubtful, and tries to help poor Adil get rid of the usurper.
10	"Kidding Around"	9 June 2006	110
Sophie is trying to teach Adil to unwish a wish. After an altercation with Philip, Sophie wishes she could see her father when he was nine years old, so Adil obliges, and Philip starts behaving as though he were nine years old. Max arrives, with a Philip designed reading lamp stuck to his head, and the pressure is on to get Adil to unwish Sophie's wish. Adil doesn't get it quite right, the grown-up Philip now appears in the body of a nine-year-old, and has to be kept from Max, who is desperate to get the reading lamp off his head and needs Philip to sort it out. Adil tries to sort out the wish, and turns the young Philip into a very old Philip, which doesn't help matters at all. With Oliver Morris, Adam Morris's son, as Young Philip. Written by Grant Cathro. Directed by Emmanuelle Dubergey.
11	"Rock Me Amadeus"	12 June 2006	111
Emma is annoyed because Annabelle Scott has impressed the boys in the Music Class by writing a song, and Emma resolves to do better. Adil is happy because his new flying carpet has arrived, after a wait of seven hundred and twelve years, but Philip tells him to get it out of the house. Before he can do so, though, the rug carries Philip out of the window and away on a white knuckle ride. Emma struggles with her song, and wishes for help. Rather than bring heartthrob Billy Blaze into the room, as Emma had expected, Adil wishes up Wolfgang Amadeus Mozart to help her. 'Wolfie' immediately falls for Sophie, and wants her as his muse. He is inspired to write, and Emma impresses the Music teacher when she passes Mozart's music off as her own. She rashly promises another song for the next day, as does Annabelle Scott. Mozart, whose advances have been spurned by Sophie, is heartbroken and refuses to write, until Sophie is forced to be nice to him. Emma takes Mozart's new composition to school, but, while everyone is distracted watching a person flying past the window on a magic carpet, Annabelle steals Emma's tape and passes it off as her own. Emma is mortified, until the music teacher expels Annabelle from the Music Class for copying Mozart's work. Sophie manages to convince a vain Mozart to return to his own time to compose his great music, and Adil finally brings Philip's magic carpet ride to an end. Everything gets back to normal. With Ben Lloyd-Hughes (misspelt as Llyod-Hugues) as Wolfgang Amadeus Mozart, and Hannah Tointon as Annabelle Scott. Written by Arnold Widdowson. Directed by Steven Bawol. Note: This is a reference to the 1980s song by Falco.
12	"Maxed Out"	3 June 2006	112
Adil is scolded by Philip for using his powers, so when Uncle Max accidentally lets him out of the lamp, he's only too pleased to have a new master. But Max realizes what's happened and wishes to be president of the world. Sophie and Emma decide he's going too far, and an exhausted Adil agrees; they must find a way to trick Max into putting Adil back in the lamp.
13	"Gnome Sweet Gnome"	14 June 2006	113
Emma wants to buy an expensive pair of shoes, and decides not to get a job like Sophie has done, she will have a yard sale instead. Philip has been to the Garden Centre, and is smitten by Nanette, who works there. He has bought a garden gnome, not because he likes gnomes, he doesn't, but just to talk to Nanette. Philip left his wallet behind at the Garden Centre, and Nanette phones to say that she'll bring it to his house. Philip wants to impress her by putting the gnome in the front garden, but, unknown to him, Sophie smashes the gnome. Adil must replace it, but Sophie's wish seems not to work. Adil gets the wish wrong, and Philip begins to turn into a garden gnome instead. Nanette duly arrives, and Philip sets out to impress her. Sophie has convinced him that he should wear a hat to cover up his developing gnome ears, although a long white beard is harder to disguise. Adil tries to keep Nanette entertained while Philip attempts to disguise his transformation, but to no avail, and Philip is fully transformed into a garden gnome. Emma's yard sale isn't going well, and she decides she needs more things to sell. Of course, one of them happens to be the garden gnome she finds in the kitchen. Having got fed up with waiting for Philip, Nanette decides to leave, and spots the gnome on Emma's stall. Nanette turns out to something of a garden gnome enthusiast, and buys Philip for thirty pounds. The girls rush to buy him back, but Nanette is revealed as a gnome nutter, who talks to her gnome collection and even knits them clothes. The wish wears off, Philip transforms back into his real self just in time, and realises, also just in time, that Nanette is not for him. With Olivia Caffrey as Nanette. Written by Lee Pressman. Directed by Emmanuelle Dubergey
14	"Do You Want to Dance?"	9 October 2006	114
Emma has been practising her classical dancing. Philip performs 'The Hustle', but she is not impressed. Adil performs his Balamkadaar Sand Dance, and no one is impressed. Sophie has borrowed Dolly, her friend Harold's pet spider, and discovers that Adil is terrified of spiders, and hides whenever he sees one. At dance class, Miss Swift tells Emma and another pupil, Frank, that, because they are the best dancers in class, she has entered them for a TV talent competition. Philip arrives to collect Emma, and meets Miss Swift for the first time. He is enamoured with her, and she with him, so Philip decides to take dancing lessons at Miss Swift's class. Worried that her father will humiliate her, Emma gets Adil to turn Philip's dancing shoes into shoes that can dance of their own accord. At dance class everyone, including Philip, is surprised at how well he can dance, and Miss Swift decides that Philip should be her new dance partner. Meanwhile, Sophie tries to cure Adil of his fear of spiders. Emma receives a phone call from her dancing partner, Frank, who tells her that they have been bumped from the TV competition in favour of Miss Swift and her new dancing partner, Philip. Neither Emma nor Philip are impressed by Miss Swift's ruthless pursuit of stardom, and Philip declines to dance with her. Miss Swift decides to have Frank as her dance partner. Philip and Emma decide to enter the competition as well, after Emma realises that the Dancing Shoes could win it for them. The Dancing Shoes turn out to be as scared of spiders as Adil is, and run away, forcing Philip to perform in ordinary shoes. Needless to say, Emma and Philip's performance of 'The Hustle' wins the show. And Adil gets cured of his arachnophobia. With David McMullen (misspelt as McMullan) as Frank, and Georgia Slowe as Bonnie Swift. Danny Bayne doubles for Adam Morris's legs in some of the dance sequences – he, as Danny B, has since gone on to better things, winning the TV talent show Grease is the Word, an interesting example of life imitating Genie in the House. Written by Grant Cathro. Directed by Emmanuelle Dubergey. Vicky Longley is credited with choreographing the dance sequences.
15	"Control Freak"	10 October 2006	115
It is Philip's birthday, but everyone seems to have forgotten. Philip tries dropping hints, but no one notices, until he tells them. The girls are not impressed, pointing out that he told them not to make a fuss, which Philip seems not to remember. Max, though, has given him tickets for the big match, and off he sets. The girls have a couple of hours to set up the surprise party they had planned for him, when they intend to give him their surprise present, the family's home movies transferred to DVD. They decide to watch the DVD, just to make sure it's okay, but the batteries in the DVD remote are dead, and there are no replacements. The girls are forced to wish for the remote to work, and, of course, Adil messes things up, so that the remote now controls everything it is pointed at, including, or especially, people. Philip, finding that Max has given him tickets for the wrong day, returns, and discovers the surprise party plans, but the girls use the remote to keep him from finding out about it. They also use it to make sure the preparations for the party are finished as quickly as possible. Max and Caroline turn up for the party, and Adil takes them upstairs to teach them the Balamkadaar Sand Movement Extravaganza. The remote begins to malfunction, and Philip gets ejected from the house. He eventually manages to get back home, though, and the party is a big success. Written by Bennett Arron. Directed by Phil Ox.
16	"Living Doll"	11 October 2006	116
Philip has told the girls to get rid of their old toys, and Emma rediscovers her favourite dolls, Lindy Lou and Len. Meanwhile, Max has arrives to stay, he has left his wife after a row over Max's ridiculous new wig, and the Nortons have to start organising their life round their new 'guest.' Emma wishes her life was like Lindy Lou's, so that she wouldn't have to do mundane things like take her old toys to the charity shop, and, Adil has to comply. Sophie thinks that Adil has changed Emma into the Lindy Lou doll, and wishes that the doll were brought to life, and so the Lindy Lou doll becomes a real life girl. And Emma returns home in a Lindy Lou outfit, livid with Adil. To make matters worse, Max falls for Lindy Lou. Adil turns the Len doll into a real person. Max realises he has made a mistake, and decides to return to his wife. Lindy Lou falls for Len, and everything is resolved. With Kristal Archer as Lindy Lou. Written by Lee Pressman. Directed by Phil Ox. Note: Lindy Lou and Len are a parody of popular dolls Barbie and her boyfriend Ken.
17	"Game On"	12 October 2006	117
Emma is playing a computer game rather than doing her chores. The game is set in Ancient Egypt, and Adil is scared of Mummies, so he doesn't want to watch. Emma rashly wishes that the Mummy, who she cannot beat, wasn't in the game, so Adil obliges. He wishes the Mummy out of the game and into the Norton House. Thankfully, the Mummy thinks that Adil is his master, because Adil looks like one of the characters in the game, and Emma tells Adil to get the Mummy to do her chores so that she can carry on with her game. Everything goes well, until Caroline arrives. Emma tells her that the Mummy is really Philip, who has fallen off a roof, and rushes to get Adil to sort things out, but Adil isn't interested in Emma's problem, he has discovered that being waited on by a Mummy servant has its attractions. Until, that is, Emma lets slip that Adil isn't really his master, and the Mummy starts chasing him again. Adil sends the Mummy back into the game, but the wish goes wrong, and the Norton living room is transformed into the game. And what's worse, Emma controls Adil with the computer's joystick. But then Emma breaks the joystick, and Adil is left to fight the Mummy on his own. Meanwhile, Sophie has designed a new type of pen, and shows it to her father for his approval, but he thinks he can do better, and produces a huge model of Sophie's design. This turns out to be very lucky for Adil, who, in a surprising plot twist, uses the mock-up monster pen to overcome the Mummy and end the game. Written by Lee Pressman. Directed by Steven Bawol.
18	"Out of Our Minds"	16 October 2006	118
Emma wishes her dad could know what it was like to be her, and Philip wishes Emma could understand what life is like for him. Adil obliges, and father and daughter swap bodies. Emma, who looks and talks like Philip, has to deliver a presentation to a client with Uncle Max, and Philip, who has turned into Emma, has a rehearsal for the school play with a boy Emma has a crush on. Embarrassingly, they must practise the love scene from Romeo and Juliet. Note: Robbie Jarvis, who plays the teenage James before this episode was first aired to the public and Mr Ying is apparently able to speak fluent Japanese over the phone. .
19	"For Your Spies Only"	17 October 2006	119
Emma and Adil have been to the cinema to see a James Bond film. After an argument with Sophie, Emma wishes that her life was more like the film she'd seen. Adil, of course, must fulfill the wish. Emma becomes, not surprisingly, M, and Philip becomes a James Bond-type agent. Max becomes the Q character, providing Philip with some secret weapons: A clown's water-squirting flower and a whoopee cushion. Emma, realising what has happened, needs to find Adil to get him to undo the wish, but Sophie, the baddie and complete with stuffed white cat, has kidnapped Adil and is torturing him by tickling his feet. He is unable to make wishes. Caroline turns out to be a double agent, and kidnaps Philip. Emma must locate Sophie's secret headquarters and free Adil to undo her wish before Sophie can finish her secret weapon, which will make everyone in the world love Maths. Written by Bennett Arron. Directed by Steven Bawol. Note: This is a reference to the Bond film For Your Eyes Only.
20	"Election Selection"	18 October 2006	120
When the school library reduces its opening hours, Sophie decides that something must be done about it and Philip suggests she stand for school president. Emma, snubbed as an airhead by Sophie's campaign team, resolves to stand against her. Sophie, of course, stands on a serious platform, while Emma thinks that no homework and better school dinners are more important. The students agree with Emma, and Sophie, fearing that she could lose the election, uses a little magic to improve her chances. Emma finds out, and enlists Adil's help to even things out. Meanwhile, Philip, needing a partner to practice with for the neighbourhood table tennis championships, which he has won five years in a row, teaches Adil's to play. Adil turns out to be a better player, prompting Philip to decide to withdraw from the competition. Adil, though, has an idea... Joining the regular cast for this episode are Jack Blumenau as Ricky, Gregory Foreman as Josh, and Michael Morgan as Alex, members of Sophie's campaign team. Jack Blumenau will appear again later in the series, as Harold in Emma TV. Written by Lee Pressman, and directed By Steven Bawol.
21	"No Time Like the Future"	19 October 2006	121
Philip invents a sandwich maker that cuts the crusts off the sandwiches. Emma isn't impressed, though, she's more interested in the last ever episode of her favourite programme, Barbie on the Beach. She's got everything ready in front of the television, and can't wait for the programme to begin. Actually, she's got two and a half hours to wait. Sophie is preparing for a meeting of the Debating Club. Her clothes, of course, must co-ordinate with her subjects, green for envy, and blue for depression. But Sophie thinks Emma has borrowed her blue headband, so sets out, with a reluctant Emma's help, to find it. While searching in the loft they discover Adil, who has come up to the loft to relax. Adil finds a jigsaw, and sets about completing it. Emma gets bored with searching, and wishes it was time for her favourite programme to begin. Adil complies, he did, after all, pass his time travel exam. Or was he late for his time travel exam? The girls return downstairs, and notice changes to the living room. Most of the objects have descriptive labels on them, and there are rope barriers everywhere. The house has moved four hundred years into the future. The microchip in Philip's sandwich maker has mutated to become the Android Emperor – "All hail the Android Emperor" – and robots rule the Earth. All humans are in zoos. And the Norton House has become a museum, in honour of the man who invented the sandwich maker, complete with an Android Philip and an android tour guide who show visiting robots around the house. Fearing they will be put in a zoo, the girls and the real Philip pretend to be androids, but they're soon discovered and are forced to hide in the loft, where they find Adil, who has only just finished his jigsaw. The girls wish to be taken back to the past, and Adil obliges. He sends further back in time than he should have done... With Dallas Campbell as Android Phil and Leah Fletcher as the Android Tour Guide. Written by Bennett Arron. Directed by Jean-Francois Didelot.
22	"Me Me Me"	23 October 2006	122
Sophie is fed up with being ignored, so she wishes that people would notice her. Adil overhears, and he must obey. Suddenly, everyone is paying Sophie attention, and she quickly begins to enjoy her new-found fame. Emma, though, soon gets fed up with being known as Sophie's brother, Amy, and decides to tell everyone a few home truths about the now famous Sophie Norton. And Sophie soon gets fed up with being famous, and wishes she was invisible. Adil, of course, fulfils her wish. Meanwhile, Adil discovers the wonderment of Philip's paper shredder, to the detriment of the paperwork on Philip's desk. With Philip Fox as Mr. Preston. Written by Bennett Arron. Directed By Emmanuelle Bebergev.
23	"I Love Adil"	24 October 2006	123
Emma has entered a fashion contest, and she has a special dress to design. Annabelle Scott has also entered the competition, and Emma is determined that Annabelle Scott should not win. Adil finds he has a secret admirer who sends him chocolate bunnies, and then a mobile phone. Suddenly deeply in love, Adil lets the girls text the secret admirer to arrange a meeting, and the secret admirer turns out to be Annabelle Scott. But Annabell Scott really has no feelings for Adil, she has other plans. Meanwhile, Philip is bored with his job, and wonders what it would be like to be a stunt man. Sophie wishes her father would cheer up, so Adil decides to let Philip find out what the job is really like. With Hannah Tointon as Annabelle Scott. Written by Grant Cathro. Directed by Emmanuelle Dubergey.
24	"Mummy Dearest"	25 October 2006	124
It's Adil's 1500th birthday, the equivalent of 15 human years. Things have already started to go wrong, though, after the girls wished that their father had a magnetic personality, and Philip finds that anything metal is attracted to him, literally. But there's worse to come, for Adil's mother, Jamilla, has decided to attend the birthday celebrations. And even worse, Adil has told his mother that he is a very successful genie to a very rich sultan and his two daughters. The Nortons agree to big Adil up, so that Adil's mother doesn't find out that Adil isn't quite the wonder genie he had told her. A genie's 1500th birthday is traditionally the time he gets married, and Adil's mother has brought his new bride, Dooma. But things don't go quite according to plan, because Sophie and Emma think Adil doesn't want to get married, even though Adil is besotted with Dooma, so the girls hatch a plan. They decide to pretend that Adil was already betrothed to Princess Sophie, and therefore couldn't marry Dooma. Meanwhile, Dooma tells Adil that she is love with another genie, and cannot marry Adil. Everything gets sorted, Adil's mother finds out that Adil is not the world's best genie, and Adil decides that he's too young to marry, anyway. This is the only episode where Emma and Sophie's dead mother is vaguely mentioned, when Philip confirms that he is a widower. With Guest Stars, Sue Kyd as Jamilla, Adil's mother, and Fiona Wade as Dooma. Written by Lee Pressman. Directed by Phil Ox.
25	"Witch Way"	26 October 2006	125
To help Sophie get her homework finished so they can go to a party, Emma wishes her sister could meet the great Medieval feminist Lady Isabella. Sophie and Adil end up back in the 13th century and discover Isabella is too busy doing housework to be a feminist. Believing her to be a wealthy princess, the Duke of Ellington, Isabella's macho cousin, wants to marry Sophie. Meanwhile, Emma must help another tyrant – her father – to clean up on her own.
26	"Emma TV"	7 May 2007	126
Sophie attends a Homework party at Harold's house. Emma, having decided that the words 'homework' and 'party' should never go together, watches television instead. She thinks she can do better than the interviewer she sees on TV, and mistakenly wishes that she was a television presenter, and Adil obliges. Emma finds she is the 'star' of Emma TV. The Norton living room becomes a television studio, complete with lights, cameras and audience. Her father is the show's director, and Uncle Max is the producer. However, Emma soon find out that being the star of a live television show isn't as easy as it looks, and she's soon floundering. Max replaces Emma with Adil, and he is an instant hit. Meanwhile, Sophie discovers that the homework party at Harold's house isn't exactly a party, as no one else is invited. During a break, Sophie spots Emma on television, and returns home to help sort out the disaster. Emma tries to unwish her wish, but Adil is becoming bigheaded, and refuses to speak to her. The girls get bundled from the house. They decide that the only way they can get to speak to Adil is to impersonate the Cheesy Girls, guests on his show. They sing a poignant song, and Adil's conscience is stirred. With Jack Blumenau as Harold, Nicholas Penfold as Billy Blaze, and Marie-Francoise Wolf as the TV Presenter. Director Steven Bawol appears as the Floor Manager! Written by Arnold Widdowson. Directed by Steven Bawol. Note: The Cheesy Girls are a parody of pop duo The Cheeky Girls, known for their hit The Cheeky Song (Touch My Bum).

=== Series 2 (2007–08) ===
No.	Title	Original release date	Prod. code
1	"The Blob"	5 November 2007	201
For her school biology project Sophie is growing a sample of bacteria. Emma thinks its just a blob of mouldy yoghurt and wipes it away, before realising what she's done. In an effort to recreate the blob, Emma asks Adil to wish up a new one. But the new blob has a mind of its own. It wants to play, and it's hungry, too. As the blob eats everything in sight that's pink, it begins to grow, and grow and grow.
2	"I Feel Like Singing"	6 November 2007	202
Sophie and Clive are watching a romantic High School Musical type DVD. Sophie hopes that it might encourage Clive to be a bit more romantic towards her. But as usual, Clive's shyness gets the better of him. Sophie gets more than she bargained for when, in a fit of frustration, she wishes that her life could be more like a musical, with disastrous results. Note: Pixie Lott appears in a cameo as one of the cheerleaders.
3	"Return of Abdab"	7 November 2007	203
Evil Abdab (who once tried to steal Adil's lamp) has returned from Genie Jail as a reformed character. Sophie and Adil meet him working in the local supermarket. He explains to them both how he has changed. Later when Abdab gets fired by his manager Adil and Sophie invite him to the house. Meanwhile Emma is starving so goes to the fridge to find a letter saying she won a trolly-load of goodies from the supermarket (where Abdab works). Philip receives a text from Max telling him to go to the airport. Adil and Sophie return home with Abdab and make him a nice meal. Sophie receives a call from her dad and tells him Abdab is staying nut Philip has suspicions and tells her to ring genie hotline. She does so, but Abdab poses as the hotline operator to sing his own praises. Abdab is in the kitchen making a drink for Adil and Sophie (who still thinks Abdab is good) finds him pouring a potion in to the drink. He ties her to a chair and explains his evil plan to steal Adil's magic (because Abdab has been stripped of his powers) then locks her in the pantry. Emma is in the supermarket about to walk away with her food but get stopped by the manager. She shows him the letter that was on her fridge there is no writing on it and gets sent home. A tired Philips car stops so he calls Max saying he can't get him from the airport but Max says he's at home and did not send him the text. Philip gets suspicious and goes home. Emma and Philip meet at home to find the front door locked they go through the back door and find Sophie in the pantry and untie her then run into the living room to save Adil and they were just in time then Emma wishes Abdab could be taken as far away as possible.
4	"Genie Swap"	8 November 2007	204
A letter arrives for Adil reminding him that every one hundred and one years, every genie in the world has to swap masters for a day. Phillip is horrified at the idea until Adil's replacement, Aisha, arrives. She's exotic, she's stunningly gorgeous, and Phillip immediately starts acting like a lovesick schoolboy. Emma has invited her teacher, Miss Spinelli, round to the house, and promised her a hot date with dad. Emma may be useless at maths, but even she works out that two women plus one man equals trouble. In the end Miss Spinelli marries an Inuk man. Note that they appear in "Adil Goes to School" part 1 as Philip's wish to go to Canada .
5	"Soap Opera"	9 November 2007	205
The problem with soap operas is that they sometimes don't seem like real life. So what happens when they do suddenly become real? Emma finds out when the characters in her favourite Soap Opera, Malibu Medical Hospital, end up in her kitchen. With Adil away on a picnic with Philip and Sophie, how will Emma explain what's going on to her new visitors? And, even worse, what can she do when she finds out that her family are now locked in their own television programme? Note: Malibu Medical Hospital is a parody of the ABC medical drama General Hospital.
6	"Eau de Sophie"	12 November 2007	206
In order to smell perfect for her date with her new boyfriend, Emma wishes up a valuable perfume. But as her wishes always do, it backfires and Adil wishes up a perfume that stinks. When Sophie accidentally uses it on herself, she finds that the magic of the perfume actually reverses the sense of smell and any man that takes a whiff of Sophie believes it is the most fantastic smell in the world! It isn't long before each and every male visitor cannot get away from the now sensational aroma, and things get bad when Clive comes for a visit. Meanwhile, Emma tricks her father into thinking it's her birthday.
7	"Juice Wars"	13 November 2007	208
It's another typical day at the Juice Crush. To start, it's amazingly busy, and Sophie and Emma's boss is uptight. But then, Emma's rival comes from the front door; no, not Annabel Scott, but the boastful Melissa Fox, and is keen to run them out of business. At home, Adil is facing a problem, in the form of Fuzzy, a great big orange imaginary friend who is keen on visiting his creator, Sophie, who wishes to cheer up. Things get worse when Melissa opens up a rival juice bar and steals the sisters' customers, and soon things get very competitive, especially when Fuzzy comes to play. Note: Tropical Girl by David Ippolito is played on the episode
8	"Super Max"	14 November 2007	209
When Sophie accidentally damages the Super Hero fancy dress outfit Emma had sown for Max, she wishes that it was once again as good as new. Adil however makes it better than new and gives the wearer of the costume Super powers. When Max discovers that he is now a genuine super hero he sets off to save the planet from an incoming meteor – and make some money on the side. This time the girls not only have to keep their wish a secret from dad, but from the whole world!
9	"My Chair Lady"	15 November 2007	210
Sophie is fed up with Phillip being grumpy all the time and decides to fix him up with his perfect woman. To help nudge him in the right direction, she gets Adil to magic up a love potion. But somehow Phillip manages to look in the wrong direction and fall for a chair instead. To make matters worse, it's a chair Emma has just sold on the internet and the new owner, a fiery French antiques' dealer, is coming to pick it up. Note: The title is a reference to the musical My Fair Lady.
10	"Junior Genie"	16 November 2007	211
It's the evening of the Parent Pupil Quiz Night, and Emma, Sophie and Phillip are off to school to battle it out with Melissa Fox and her family in the grand final. An unexpected visitor from Balamabakadar – Adil's kid brother, Junior – arrives, and decides he likes the Norton's home so much he never wants to leave. When Peggy discovers not one, but two genies in the house, she believes she has finally got herself the scoop of the century.
11	"Double Trouble"	5 December 2007	212
A new boyband are filming at Juice Crush, and Emma is determined to get herself a part in the video. The girls are shocked to discover that the band's obnoxious lead singer, Kurt St Moritz, is Adil's double. They're even more shocked when Emma's careless wish causes both him and Phillip to find themselves lost in the jungles of Borneo. With Kurt gone there's only one person who can stand in for the missing singer – step forward pop sensation... Adil.
12	"Princess Emma"	6 December 2007	213
When Emma is given too many chores to do, she decides life is unfair and wishes to become a Princess. Suddenly everyone does as she says – Max becomes her own private butler, the teachers at school all bow to her, and she even has a handsome Prince lined up... or so she thinks. Meanwhile, Adil and Phillip are on a hot-air balloon trip that takes a turn for the worse when Adil tries to help out.
13	"Girls Will Be Boys"	7 December 2007	214
Emma wants to join a band but finds out that they are only looking for boys. She tells Adil that she wishes there was a way she could change from a girl to a boy. Adil makes a transforming potion and Emma auditions for the band – and is given the part. As Emma fancies one of the band members, she finds a way of using her 'boy' self to persuade the band member to go out with her. All goes well until Emma has to be at the same place at the same time as both boy and girl!
14	"Genie Flu"	10 December 2007	215
Adil wakes up one day feeling a little under the weather, but this is no ordinary illness. They must travel the four corners of the world to get the remedy before everyone catches it...including the hunk Emma has her eye on!
15	"Good Morning, Miss Norton"	11 December 2007	207
Emma wishes to run the school for the day, but soon finds herself faced with more responsibilities than she had expected and before the School Inspector shuts the School down with a Bulldozer.
16	"Drama Queen"	12 December 2007	216
Sophie and Clive are inspired by the work of Marie Curie. Clive creates a play about Marie's life, which Sophie thinks is excellent and then decides to put on a production of it. Sophie refuses Clives offer of playing Marie Curie. Then Emma decides to get in on the act. She makes Clive agree with everything she says, using Adil's help, and turns the play into an all singing, all dancing West End spectacular!
17	"Back to the Eighties"	21 May 2008	217
Max and Philip tell Emma about how well behaved they were when they were younger. Emma wishes she could go back to 1987 to see how well behaved they really were. In the eighties, Emma encourages the young Max and Phillip to skip their maths exam and audition with their band in front of a famous record producer. Meanwhile, Sophie and Adil discover that tampering with the past can have disastrous results in the future.
18	"Forget About It"	22 May 2008	218
Sophie and Philip criticise Emma on her homework, so she wishes her family weren't such experts on everything. This causes Philip to lose his sense of direction on the day he is navigating Max on a car rally and Sophie can't handle numbers when made manager of the juice bar for the day.
19	"Genie of the Year"	23 May 2008	219
It is the Genie of the Year, and three genies are chosen to perform. For some reason, Adil is one of them!
20	"Bamboozled"	24 May 2008	220
Adil panics because he is expecting a visit from the extremely important Bamboozle of Balamkadaar. His plan to get everyone out of the house fails miserably, when Philip falls and trips his ankle. When Peggy unexpectedly, the Bamboozle decides he wants her for his bride. Not only that, he wants the Norton's house for his new palace in the end the Bamboozle is Grounded for 500 years with no magie and servants and has to work for Himself in Gold Mines.
21	"Car Wash"	23 May 2008	221
Sophie and Emma want to make some extra money, so Philip suggests they wash his car for money. The girls hate washing Philip's car, when their next door neighbour, Peggy, says she'll pay to have her car washed, Sophie comes up with a plan: she asks Adil to shrink the car down to the size of a toy, so they can wash them in the sink. Max says the girls can wash his car, but Adil accidentally shrinks Max's car down while Philip is inside.
22	"Mr. Write"	26 May 2008	222
Sophie has trouble writing a funny story for school so she ask Adil to give her a computer application to help her but she finds out that everything she writes comes to life! Emma asks a boy to meet her dad who is not impressed
23	"You've Been Framed"	27 May 2008	223
Sophie cannot believe that Emma gets 97% in her art test. To prove that she too has talent, she attempts to draw a portrait of dad but all goes wrong as Sophie can't seem to get it right. She then wishes her drawing was more life like and out comes dad from the living room and into the canvas! Note: The title is a reference to ITV video series You've Been Framed!
24	"Return to Balamkadaar"	28 May 2008	224
25	"Return to Balamkadaar"	29 May 2008	225
26	"Return to Balamkadaar"	30 May 2008	226
Adil's friend, the legendary Ali Baba arrives at the Norton household to invite Adil to his wedding to Sapphire, the Princess of Balamkadaar. Ali tricks Adil into going into his lamp, and he seals it. He flies back to Balamkadaar, while Emma tries to follow him to warn Adil that Ali is dangerous. Matters become more complicated when Ali becomes Adil's master and it is revealed that "Ali" is actually Adil's enemy, one of the forty thieves who stole his lamp in disguise. He wishes for Adil to destroy the Emma and Sophie when they find out about his plan to kill the king and princess of Balamkadaar, to make him become king. Adil sacrifices himself instead of destroying girls, and becomes a camel. The girls escape and rush to save the king, princess and Adil. Note: This was later aired on Nick as a TV movie, Return to Balamkadaar in July 2008 This was an actual series finale to the second series.

=== Series 3 (2008–09) ===
No.	Title	Original release date	Prod. code
1	"World of Emma"	3 November 2008	301
Emma wishes Sophie was a bit more like her, with disastrous results. Now it catches on, and the whole school turns into Emma – Even Adil and Dad.
2	"The Curse of the Genie Ring"	4 November 2008	302
Sophie finds a genie ring named Backevil, which she uses to wish for good things to happen, but each good thing comes with a price, a bad thing also happens.
3	"Pony Tale"	6 January 2009	303
Max's niece Louise gets left with the girls and she discovers Adil's secret with disastrous results. While Philip and Sophie go for a flying lesson also with disastrous results.
4	"Teacher's Pet"	7 November 2008	304
Sophie and Emma become rivals for the attention of the hunky new teacher.
5	"Groovy Kind of Guy"	8 November 2008	305
Due to a mistaken wish Clive gets split into two characters, one wimpy and one super cool. Sophie has to try to restore the situation.
6	"Look To the Future"	9 November 2008	306
Sophie wishes she could see into the future and when she does she finds that she is always misunderstanding what she sees.
7	"Genie Hotline"	10 November 2008	307
Adil, like all Genies has to take his turn at the Genie hotline, but he is on a mission and gets Emma to do all the work. She thinks it will be easy until she finds out how many genies there are in the world that need advice, she tries to help Adil and be on a date with a boy she likes without him finding out the truth!
8	"Fame School"	20 November 2008	308
This features Faye Wallace who won a competition to be in an episode. Watching a tv show about a performing arts school Emma wishes her school was like that, and then suddenly it is but Sophie is the popular talented pupil.?
9–10	"Adil Goes to School (Part 1 and 2)"	31 December 2008	309–310
A two-part episode, in which Adil becomes a real boy and has to attend the School. But he finds being Human causes more problems and suddenly Sophie revies help from the Bambozzle that his mother has stooped his grounding because of his good work. This special episode features Angus Harrison from Skins.
11	"At Home with the Hortons"	5 January 2009	311
The 'Horton' family move in next door, a widowed designer mum with two boys and a female Genie called Adele. Soon rivalry develops between the two families.

=== Series 4 (2009–10) ===
This is part of series 3 but was split into two series for unknown reasons.

No.	Title	Original release date	Prod. code
1	"House of Ghosts"	10 August 2009	312
Sophie and Emma are having a sleepover party at the house. It's vital for their reputation that it's a success. While Philip, Adil and Max test a new easy to erect tent in the garden. While swapping Ghost stories the girl realise a real Ghost is in the house who must scare a hundred people before he can graduate 'upstairs'.
2	"Rock On"	11 August 2009	313
Emma and Sophie are desperate to attend a rock festival to see their favourite band, Zombie Cottage. When Philip forbids them from going, Sophie makes a wish, which has the unexpected result of bringing the rock festival into The Norton's back garden. The girls now have their work cut out trying to stop Philip from stepping out the back door and discovering fifty thousand music fans camped out on his back lawn.
3	"Sophie Genie"	12 August 2009	314
Emma and Sophie, along with Clive, film a music video for the school's website. Emma accidentally wishes for Sophie to become a genie. Clive accidentally rubs the lamp and soon becomes the master of Sophie. Unknowingly, he wishes for numerous things without knowing Sophie is a genie...
4	"Yo Ho Adil"	13 August 2009	315
The house accidentally gets wished into a Pirate ship under the command of Adils old pirate Captain the vicious Stella Storm. Max thinks its all for a fancy dress party and Philip despeartely tries to save the situation when they come under attack from a rival pirate ship.
5	"Rock The Casbah"	14 August 2009	316
Adil gets invited to rejoin his old group The Turbinators. While he is a way a temporary Genie is assigned to the Nortons who it seems is worse than Adil is. Note: This is a reference to the song Rock the Casbah by 1970s band The Clash.
6	"Flower Power"	17 August 2009	317
Philip's mum, a famous explorer, turns up with a rare flower from South America to present at the Royal Society. Adil mistakenly cooks it in the oven and has to wish up a replacement, which has a mind of its own. Meanwhile Philip and Max are rivals for his mum's attentions.
7	"Our House"	18 August 2009	318
Max's nephew Sam (brother of Louise) comes to stay for the day while Philip and Max try to fix a new Toy Rocket. Sophie accidentally wishes the house was like their old Dolls House and they find themselves at the Nephew's mercies as he plays with the Doll's House and its occupants. Note: The title of the episode is a reference to Our House, a song by the British band Madness.
8	"Don't Tie Me Down"	19 August 2009	319
While wishing to be closer to Clive. Sophie accidentally causes Emma to become attached to Clive and has to follow him everywhere. Sophie not realising thinks that Emma is obsessed with Clive and becomes jealous.
9	"Max Actor"	20 August 2009	320
Max is an awful amateur actor and is playing Hamlet, so reluctantly, Sophie wishes for a good review for him. Emma talks Max into becoming a film star and she becomes his agent. Max auditions for a part in the Sci Fi Film 'Space Wars' and thinks he is to be the next 'Sam Holo' but he is mistaken!! Notes: Space Wars is a parody of Star Wars.
10	"World Genie Day"	21 August 2009	321
It's World Genie Day, which means that a genie should have another job to take their minds off for a day in 501 years. Adil decides to go to work with Sophie at the Juice Crush bar.
11–12	"Genie Without A Lamp (Part 1 and 2)"	27 February 2010	322–323
Adil becomes have-Invisible without his lamp, Emma and Sophie must find his lamp before he becomes invisible forever. To make matters worse, Emma has accidentally wished Phillip and Max to have the mental capacity of babies.
13–15	"Legend of the Dragon (Part 1, 2 and 3)"	4 December 2010	324–326
The cast are off to Paris, France, Max and Phillip are on their way to Exhibit the Max Vax only they leave it at home, and then get stranded in the countryside. Emma and Sophie take the magic carpet with Adil to Paris to return it to them. Emma tries to get into a fashion show, ending up being part of it, and Adil and Sophie accidentally unleash a terrible force releasing a Dragon into the real world. While Max and Philip meet a Farmer who has a score to settle with Max. Adil stops the dragon from destroying Paris and goes back to the alternate universe.
