= David Lloyd (actor) =

English actor and screenwriter

David Lloyd (born 17 May 1955) is an English actor and screenwriter, perhaps best known from his role in Maid Marian and her Merry Men, where he played Graeme, one of the two guards (alongside Mark Billingham's Gary).

== Biography ==
David Lloyd was born in 1955 in Wallasey, Cheshire, England, and is, according to the IMDb, 6' 1" tall. Lloyd studied drama at Manchester University between 1978 and 1981, where he met and worked closely with Ben Elton, later one of Britain's foremost comedians and a key figure in Alternative comedy.

=== Sitcoms ===
Lloyd's friendship with Elton led to him appearing in minor roles in the landmark 1980s (and Elton-written) sitcom The Young Ones, as well as that series' less-well-received semi-sequel Filthy Rich & Catflap. Bitparts (usually in uniform) followed in other sitcoms: Lloyd was a postman in Making Out, a recurring German guard in 'Allo 'Allo! and a policeman in The New Statesman, with Young Ones star Rik Mayall. Lloyd also featured in an episode of Mayall and Edmonson's 1991 sitcom Bottom.

=== Maid Marian ===
Lloyd is best known, however, for his role as Graeme in the 1989 BBC Children's Television series Maid Marian and her Merry Men. Alongside Mark Billingham's Gary, the two guards were ostensibly part of 'ye baddies', but were really very sympathetic, (if slightly dim-witted) comedic sidekicks and foils to Tony Robinson's Sheriff of Nottingham. Initially, this semi-musical pseudo-Children's comedy programme was written solely by Mr Robinson, but by the third series, both Lloyd and Billingham were helping out with storylines and scripts, both ultimately gaining on-screen credits as co-writers. The three remain friends, and can be seen discussing writing Maid Marian on the DVD release of Series 3.

=== Other children's TV ===
Lloyd (and Billingham)'s work on Maid Marian with Tony Robinson gave them a grounding in comedy scriptwriting, and spurred them to write more. Between 1993 and 1996, the two collaborated on the writing of another children's comedy programme: Harry's Mad, based on the novel by British children's author Dick King-Smith. The programme featured an intelligent talking parrot ("Madison"), inherited by his owner, Harry, upon the death of his uncle. The parrot's abilities were only known by a select few, but would be heard at inopportune moments, causing considerable trouble for Harry. The show ran for four series, and also featured Lloyd, Billingham and Maid Marian co-star Howard Lew Lewis in various small roles.

Soon after (1996 to 1998), Lloyd was back in front of the cameras, playing Mr Bill Hunter, the husband of Tessa Peake-Jones's character, who adopt the main character of Dinah Glass in the BBC series The Demon Headmaster (based on the books by Gillian Cross). Although rarely seen during the first series, Lloyd's character played a larger role in the second and third. (A fourth series was reputedly planned, but ultimately scrapped, and never filmed.)

In March 2009 Lloyd made a guest appearance as the character “Mr. Marvelloso” in the BBC children's series 'Grandpa in my Pocket'.

=== Screenwriting ===
While taking minor roles in such programmes as Casualty, The Bill and Waking the Dead, Lloyd has turned his skill and experience from Maid Marian and Harry's Mad into a career as a screenwriter of non-Children's programmes, having produced scripts for Casualty (2004) and EastEnders (2003–06).

In 2001, he began writing for the daytime BBC medical soap/drama Doctors, and was credited on writing over 70 episodes.

== Non TV ==
David Lloyd was the match-day announcer for Bristol City football club, and is also a keen cricketer with Backwell Flax Bourton Cricket Club. He plays for the Somerset County Over 60s team, and is also a regular umpire in the West of England Premier League.

He is a regular book reviewer on BBC Radio Bristol and owns a 50% share in a cider press.

== Select screenography ==
=== Actor ===
- The Young Ones (1982)
- Filthy Rich & Catflap (1987) – Rocky (1987)
- 'Allo 'Allo! (1982) – German Guard (1988–1989)
- Making Out (1989) – Postman
- Maid Marian and Her Merry Men (1989–94) – Graeme (1989–94)
- The New Statesman (1987) – Police Sergeant (1991)
- Agatha Christie's Poirot (1989) – Museum Attendant (1991)
- Bottom (1991) – Willy (1991)
- Casualty (1986) – Will Driver (1992)
- Harry's Mad (1993–96)
- The Demon Headmaster – Mr. Hunter (1996–98)
- The Bill (1984) – Warden (1998)
- The Vice (1999) – Punter (2000)
- Waking the Dead (2000) – Derek Raynor (2004)

=== Writer ===
- Maid Marian and Her Merry Men (1989–94)
  - "Tunnel Vision" (1993)
- Harry's Mad (1993–96)
  - various episodes
- EastEnders (1985)
  - Episode #? (14 April 2003)
  - Episode #? (7 July 2003)
  - Episode #? (23 February 2004)
  - Episode #? (5 August 2004)
  - Episode #? (30 September 2004)
  - Episode #? (19 December 2005)
  - Episode #3254 (2 November 2006)
- Casualty (1986)
  - "Who Cares?" (14 August 2004)
- Doctors (2000)
  - "A Suitable Alternative" (15 May 2001)
  - "A Twist of Fate" (4 September 2001)
  - "Neighbours" (28 September 2001)
  - "Good Companions" (22 November 2001)
  - "Cats" (11 March 2002)
  - "It Shouldn't Happen to a Doctor" (18 April 2002)
  - "Tears of a Clown" (21 May 2002)
  - "Happy Days Are Here Again" (5 September 2002)
  - "Stuck in the Middle" (11 October 2002)
  - "A Tangled Web" (4 February 2003)
  - "As Time Goes By" (4 April 2003)
  - "Physician Heal Thyself" (8 May 2003)
  - "Food Glorious Food" (10 June 2003)
  - "Deep Prejudice" (21 October 2003)
  - "Twins" (2 December 2003)
  - "Baby Doc" (9 February 2004)
  - "Holding the Baby" (17 March 2004)
  - "Room 101" (18 March 2004)
  - "Last Chance" (16 April 2004)
  - "In the House of the Dead" (5 October 2004)
  - "Dim Tresbasu" (6 January 2005)
  - "In the Library, with the Candlestick: Part 1" (3 March 2005)
  - "In the Library, with the Candlestick: Part 2" (4 March 2005)
  - "In Custody" (22 April 2005)
  - "Who's Been Sleeping in My Bed?" (23 November 2005)
  - "Abuse of Power" (17 March 2006)
  - "All in the Mind" (12 September 2006)
  - "Words Unspoken" (12 February 2007)
  - "Is You Is" (2 May 2007)
  - "Just Deserts" (25 July 2007)
  - "In a Hole" (5 October 2007)
  - "Hammer Blow" (17 December 2007)

Food for Thought (2021)

- Heavy Traffic (2020) ... (by) - Tough Choices (2020) ... (by) - November 1 (2019) ... (by) - Sunny Climes (2019) ... (by) - She's Gone (2018) ... (by) - Free Spirit (2018) ... (by) - Place of Safety (2018) ... (by) - Eric (2018) ... (by) - The Fruit Forbidden (2017) ... (by) - Won't Get Fooled Again (2017) ... (by) - Magpie (2017) ... (by) - Professor Pickering (2016) ... (by) - Just Say No (2016) ... (by) - What About Me? (2016) ... (by) - Menage a Quatre (2016) ... (by) - About Time (2015) ... (by) - Fallen Hero (2015) ... (by) - Injecting a Little Spice (2015) ... (by) - The Neighbours from Hull (2015) ... (by) - Arthur and Stan (2015) ... (by) - Scullery Boy (2014) ... (by) - The Bespectacled Bounder (2012) ... (by) - Six Feet Under (2011) ... (written by) - A Broken Heart (2011) ... (written by) - Best Laid Plans (2010) ... (written by) - Climb Every Mountain (2010) ... (written by) - Bully for You (2009) ... (written by) - Toss of a Coin (2009) ... (written by) - Choices (2009) ... (written by) - Consequential Loss (2009) ... (written by) - Clubbing Together (2009) ... (written by) - Standing Up (2009) ... (written by) - Stranger in a Strange Land (2008) ... (written by) - The Ticking Clock (2008) ... (written by) - Mr Ten Percent (2008) ... (written by) - Stand Up and Be Counted (2008)
