= Backup (TV series) =

- Genre: Police procedural
- Created by: Nigel McCrery
- Written by: Roy Mitchell
- Directed by: Jan Sargent; Bob Blagden; Douglas Mackinnon
- Starring: Martin Troakes; Christopher John Hall; Nick Miles; Katrina Levon; Calum MacPherson; William Tapley; Adam Morris; Peter Sullivan
- Composer: John Lunn
- Country of origin: United Kingdom
- Original language: English
- No. of series: 2
- No. of episodes: 14

Production
- Executive producers: Caroline Oulton; Chris Parr; Tony Virgo
- Producer: Hilary Salmon
- Cinematography: Steve Saunderson; Peter Fearon
- Editor: John Rosser
- Running time: 50 minutes
- Production company: BBC Pebble Mill

Original release
- Network: BBC1
- Release: 7 September 1995 – 2 July 1997

Backup is a British television police procedural crime drama series, devised by Nigel McCrery and Roy Mitchell, that ran for a total of fourteen episodes across two series on BBC One between 7 September 1995, and 2 July 1997. Focusing on the work of a police Operational Support Unit, similar to the Territorial Support Group, the series follows the operations of the nine officers of Charlie Van, an OSU of the West Midlands Police.

Both series were filmed at Pebble Mill Studios, and saw the likes of Martin Troakes, Christopher John Hall and Nick Miles among the main cast. A then-unknown Matthew Rhys starred in the second series as PC Steve "Hiccup" Higson, his first televisual role. Initial press releases for the series stated, "When things get too much for the officers on the front line, they call for Backup, the Operational Support Unit (OSU)."

Notably, the series has never been released on DVD, and aside from a single repeat run on UK Gold in the late 1990s, has yet to be further repeated on British television.

== Cast ==
- Martin Troakes as Sgt. Bill "Sarge" Parkin
- Christopher John Hall as PC Eric "Token" Warren
- Nick Miles as PC John "Thug" Barrett
- Katrina Levon as PC Gill "Dippy" Copson
- Calum MacPherson as PC Roger "Flub" Tennant
- William Tapley as PC Lionel "Oz" Adams
- Christopher Quinn as PC Richard Goole
- Adam Morris as Inspector "Jean" Harlow
- Peter Sullivan as DI Ken Overton

=== Series 1 (1995) ===
- Alex Norton as PC Iain "Jock" MacRae
- Colette Koo as PC Susan "Bruce" Li
- Oliver Milburn as PC Wayne "Bog" Cheetham
- Suzan Crowley as DCI Helen Chivers
- Sam Cox as Superintendent Alec Hallsworth

=== Series 2 (1997) ===
- James Gaddas as PC Jim "Grim" Reaper
- Matthew Rhys as PC Steve "Hiccup" Higson
- Kate Gartside as DS Kath Reaper

== Episodes ==
=== Series 1 (1995) ===
Episode	Title	Written by	Directed by	Original release date
1	"Not All There"	Roy Mitchell	Jan Sargeant	7 September 1995
After assisting DI Overton on a bungled drugs raid, the members of Charlie Serial are assigned to look for the body of a missing teenage girl, a suspected victim of former sex offender John Kerridge. The investigation proves emotional for Token, as he struggles to deal with the memories of his teenage sister's disappearance some years earlier. The search is wound up when a body is found, but it is later discovered not to be the victim the team are looking for. During interview, Kerridge confesses to another five murders and the team are sent back to his farm to dig for more bodies. Whilst escorting Kerridge to and from the farm to identify the locations of the further victims, Charlie Serial come under attack from a group of emotionally distraught parents of Kerridge's victims. And when the body of Token's missing sister is discovered, the team are left in shellshock.
2	"Tender Loving Care"	Steve Trafford	Jan Sargeant	14 September 1995
Charlie Serial's performance comes into question after a string of errors during a riot training exercise. Meanwhile, ex-soldier Tony Deeley returns from Bosnia with plans to prevent his sister getting married, and traumatised by his experiences of war, barricades himself into her house. Thug is furious when his riot shield shatters in the face of heavy fire and Bruce is given a warning by Inspector Harlow for failing to check the equipment correctly. Supt. Hallsworth orders Token to take a week's leave as the press coverage of his sister's murder continues to trouble him. Sarge finds himself on the brink of divorce after Brenda's father Ted, who suffers from advanced dementia, moves into the family home. Charlie Serial finally catch up with Tony on his sister's wedding day, and Sarge has to use all of his powers of persuasion to prevent the ceremony from being disturbed.
3	"Toleration Zone"	Steve Trafford	Jan Sargeant	21 September 1995
Charlie Serial are assigned to keep the peace when hostilities erupt between the residents of Wood Vale and local prostitutes, who are using residential streets to ply their trade. Meanwhile, Flub tries to help out young mum Joyce, whose son David has been taken away by social services following reports of violence in the family home. With money tight and little chance of securing a safe home for David, Joyce ends up on the game under the care of notorious pimp Ralf Johnson. DI Overton is angered when Supt. Hallsworth interrupts a live drugs squad operation by ordering Charlie Serial to clear the streets of prostitutes in order to please the local residents. However, their actions are less than well received, and a group of vigilantes decide to take drastic action, involving members of the local Asian community to stage a silent protest in the middle of the red light district.
4	"Mouth and Trousers"	Avril E. Russell	Douglas Mackinnon	28 September 1995
Li's first day as acting sergeant ends in disaster when Charlie Serial run a fifteen-year-old boy and his girlfriend driving a stolen car off the road into a local river. Meanwhile, Ch. Insp. Best of the Organised Crime Squad assigns Charlie Serial to assist with policing an upcoming UEFA Cup semi-final match between Liverpool and Aston Villa. They are warned to keep an eye out for a number of Liverpool supporters who have exclusion orders banning them from every football stadium in the country. However, Shane Levey, a Liverpool supporter holding a lifetime exclusion order, has another score to settle with Pez, the new boyfriend of his former partner. When Shane and his friends meet Pez for a pre-match scuffle, events take a tragic turn and Shane is stabbed, later succumbing to injuries in hospital. Events provoke Thug into making a decision about his love life.
5	"Badlands"	Simon Stirling	Douglas Mackinnon	5 October 1995
Charlie Serial are assigned to patrol the inner-city housing estate from hell when events threaten to spiral out of control following an attack on an elderly couple during a burglary. Suspicion initially falls on three youths that DI Overton suspects may be dealing drugs on the estate. But after Thug makes a less an ambiguous arrest, attentions turn towards a female gang, a member of whom Flub tries to take under his wing. Meanwhile, as Sarge returns to duty, Li is given both praise and criticism by Insp. Harlow for her stint as acting sergeant. When the team discover that knowledge of a childish prank carried out against Bog has reached the ears of the station bigwigs, Thug is quick to brand him a grass, unaware that Charlie Serial may have another leak in their ranks. Jealous of Token's relationship with Dippy, Thug makes an anonymous phone call to his wife.
6	"Happy That Way"	Roy Mitchell	Douglas Mackinnon	12 October 1995
Charlie Serial are assigned to go undercover as prostitutes, drug dealers and rent boys in order to stamp out crime on a local common, while attempting to catch a flasher who has been targeting underage children. Bog's first arrest happens to be a local councillor with connections to Supt. Hallsworth. Token and Bruce caution a man who appears to have trained his Pitbull to be racist. Oz is left stunned when his estranged wife turns up, having travelled from Adelaide to introduce him to his ten-year-old son, Nick, that he never knew he had. Sarge and Jock catch a drugs squad detective having sex with an underage girl in his car, and Sarge has no choice but to arrest him. Meanwhile, Chivers and Overton are spearheading an operation to catch a major drug dealer operating out of a local club, unaware that Sarge's arrest could compromise the entire operation.
7	"Clubbing – Part 1"	Roy Mitchell	Bob Blagden	19 October 1995
Acting upon information provided to DCI Chivers, Charlie Serial assist with closing down a city nightclub run by ex-con Linton McLinton, which is notorious for the flow of narcotics through its doors. A planned raid on the premises seems a dead cert to provide the evidence required to nail Linton once and for all, but Chivers and Overton are furious to discover that Linton appears to have been warned of their arrival. However, Charlie Serial make a number of arrests, including small time dealer Eamonn Vernon, who informs Jock and Bog that Terry Stoppard did not take his own life. Meanwhile, tensions amongst the officers of Charlie Serial continue to grow as both Bruce and Thug are reprimanded by Insp. Harlow. Supt. Hallsworth confronts DCI Chivers over suspected corruption involving her team, and finds he may have more to lose than he thought.
8	"Cut and Dried – Part 2"	Roy Mitchell	Bob Blagden	26 October 1995
Tensions among the officers of Charlie Serial remain at an all-time high, as Sarge works out that Jock is the grass and sets about confronting him. Meanwhile, Supt. Hallsworth plans an operation to expose DCI Chivers and DI Overton's corrupt activities. Token is sent undercover to stake out a hairdressers suspected of being the base where Beckwith and his henchmen are operating from. Charlie Serial lie in wait as DCI Chivers and DI Overton arrive slap bang in the middle of a planned drug deal between Beckwith and Eamonn Vernon, his last before leaving the country before a new life in Spain. However, Beckworth's plan to ensure Chivers and Overton's silence following his escape attracts the attention of Charlie Serial, who burst in all guns blazing to a hail of gunfire. Chivers and Oz are both shot in the ensuing commotion, while Dippy faces heartache of her own.

=== Series 2 (1997) ===
Episode	Title	Written by	Directed by	Original release date
1	"A Night Out with the Lads"	Roy Mitchell	Bob Blagden	28 May 1997
Following the events of the shootout, Overton returns to duty and is awarded the George Cross for bravery. Asked to assist in the search for evidence of the attendees of an illegal amateur fight, newbie Hiccup (Matthew Rhys) finds more than he bargained for when he unexpectedly stumbles upon the body of sixteen-year-old Tony Squire, a frequent absconder from a local care home. Local CID are assigned to investigate, and attempt to use Dippy's former relationship with Martin Coupland (Billy Geraghty), the owner of the farm where the fight took place, as leverage to gather further information. Meanwhile, fellow new recruit Jim 'Grim' Reaper is repeatedly absent from the Van, and Thug suspects that he may have been planted by the top brass to keep eye on the unit. Sarge is excited when Brenda breaks the news that he is to become a father for the first time.
2	"Partners"	Susan Wilkins	Bob Blagden	4 June 1997
Charlie Serial are on the trail of three escaped convicts. The first collapses and suffers as asthma attack during his arrest at the hands of Oz. The second jumps from a roof following a short chase and ends up in the back of an ambulance. The third, Christopher Carter (Rob Spendlove), proves slightly more illusive. He's attempting to flee the country, but not before collecting his beloved daughter and convincing her to come with him. Discovering that she has been the victim of a gang of vicious school bullies, Carter sets his sights on vengeance - but a bungled kidnap attempt ultimately leads the team to discover where he and his daughter have been hiding out. Meanwhile, Thug's luck is in when Harlow's PA invites him out for a drink, and Flub and Reaper clash when Flub makes an unflattering comment about Reaper's wife (Kate Gartside) - unaware she's the new DS.
3	"Touched"	Avril E. Russell	Jan Sargeant	11 June 1997
On their way back from a routine operation, Charlie Serial are called to the scene of a train crash, and in the absence of the fire service, are forced to mount a rescue to try and save a number of trapped passengers. One of the three carriages is barely holding onto the bridge from where it has derailed. Parkin manages to help twelve of the thirteen passengers inside to safety, but just seconds before he can rescue the remaining passenger, Jacqueline Kinnaird (Suzanne Sinclair), the carriage dismounts and crashes onto the field below, exploding in a ball of flames. Despite their bravery, an official inquest into the operation is launched, where the team face tough cross examination from Youden (Don Warrington), a high-flying barrister employed by Jacqueline's parents, to determine whether or not Parkin's actions ultimately lead to the untimely death of their daughter.
4	"Presence"	Robin Mukherjee	Jan Sargeant	18 June 1997
Community policing provides headaches for Charlie Serial when a fight flares up on a pub on a local housing estate being ruled by a protection racket.
5	"Not Cricket"	Robin Mukherjee	Jan Sargeant	25 June 1997
A worker at a local factory is sacked, leading to unrest in the local community. The team is called to attend the picket lines. Tennant investigates when he suspects the factory of using child labour.
6	"Something for the Weekend, Sir?"	Roy Mitchell	Bob Blagden	2 July 1997
Copson becomes convinced that Overton is involved with a child sex ring after she sees him with a suspected paedophile, and decides to break into his house to find evidence. Meanwhile, Parkin's loyalties are put to the test when his wife goes into labour while he is on duty.
