= Parrington =

People with the surname Parrington include:

- Francis Rex Parrington (1905-1981), British palaeontologist
- Gareth Parrington, child actor
- Henry Parrington, English/New Zealand cricketer.
- Samantha Parrington, fictional superhero Valkyrie (Marvel Comics)
- Vernon Louis Parrington (1871-1929), American literary historian
- William Parrington (1889-1980), English cricketer
