= Angus Kennedy (actor) =

British actor (born 1958)

- Born: 1 March 1958 (age 68); Malmesbury, Wiltshire, England
- Occupation: Actor
- Years active: 1981–present

Angus Kennedy (born 1 March 1958) is a British actor in television and theatre.

== Career ==
Kennedy trained at the Guildford School of Acting. He did repertory work at Watford, Farnham, Leatherhead, Hull, Huddersfield, Basingstoke, plus London's West End in Number One at the Queens Theatre London, and Saki at the Gate Theatre, He has done theatre tours all over Europe in Animal Farm, The Mousetrap and School for Scandal. His has appeared regularly on TV and Film.

Between 2005 and 2008, he filmed three series of the internationally successful series Genie in the House for Nickelodeon, in which he played Max Baxter (Uncle Max). He is in the feature films Pride and Prejudice and Zombies and Allied directed by Robert Zemeckis. Intrigo: Death of an Author directed by Daniel Alfredson. Other screenwork includes Back to Life for the BBC. Governor Wilkes in the Sci Fi film Snowflakes. The zombie thriller Alive, directed by David Marantz, which was interrupted by the COVID-19 lockdown and took nearly a year to complete. He appears in the Netflix feature film Love at First Sight. He is the British Prime Minister in the Amazon series The Power and is also in the Netflix Neil Gaiman series The Sandman. He plays Capt Amias Ratliff in series 7 of Outlander and is in the recent feature films William Tell and Savage House

Kennedy resides in Guildford, Surrey.
