= Howard Lew Lewis =

English comedian and actor (1941–2018)

- Born: 21 August 1941; London, England, UK
- Died: 20 January 2018 (aged 76); Edinburgh, UK
- Occupations: comedian actor
- Spouse: Anna Goodall
- Children: 1

Howard Lew Lewis (21 August 1941 – 20 January 2018) (born Howard R. Lewis) was an English comedian and actor, best known for his roles in comedy series including Maid Marian and Her Merry Men, Brush Strokes and Chelmsford 123.

== Biography ==
Lewis was born in London, England. His parents were both born in south Wales (Tenby and Bridgend). As a young man, Lewis flat-shared with Ken Morley (Reg Holdsworth of Coronation Street) and Andy Carr, actor and screenwriter. His first job was with the Royal Air Force, where he was a computer operator. He worked for several years in computing and telecommunications, but when promoted to manager-level he decided instead to pursue acting as a career after being asked to fire a colleague whom he believed to be a good worker. He was married twice. His first marriage lasted just over a year. His second marriage was to Anna Goodall. They married in 1990 with Ken Morley as best man.

== Television ==
One of his more notable roles was as Rabies, one of the Merry Men in the BBC children's television comedy series Maid Marian and Her Merry Men where he appeared in all 26 episodes. He also had a prominent part as the dim barman Elmo Putney in the BBC sitcom Brush Strokes between 1986-91.

Lewis also featured in "Now You See Them", a 1988 episode of the ITV anthology drama series Dramarama.

He appeared in two other prominent historical comedy series - as Blag in the Channel 4 sitcom Chelmsford 123 (1988) set during the Roman occupation of Britain in AD 123, and as assorted medieval peasants, (including Piers and Mr Applebottom) in The Black Adder (1983) and he had minor parts in two Ronnie Barker sitcoms - The Magnificent Evans (1984) and Open All Hours (1985) - and the ITV comedy-drama Minder (1984).

Year	Title	Role	Notes
1978	Pennies From Heaven	Policeman	1 episode
1983	Reilly, Ace of Spies	Rowhedge	1 episode
1983	The Black Adder	Mr. Applebottom, Piers	2 episodes
1983	Widows	Binman (uncredited)	1 episode
1984	Minder	Ronnie	1 episode
1984	The Magnificent Evans	Bridgegroom	1 episode
1985	C.A.T.S. Eyes	Stallholder	1 episode
1985	Open All Hours	Byron	1 episode
1986	Prospects	Barman	1 episode
1986	Mr Pye	Mr. Rice	4 episodes
1986	The Bill	George Harris	1 episode
1986-91	Brush Strokes	Elmo Putney	38 episodes
1987	Pulaski	Props Man	1 episode
1987	The Charmer	Gardener	1 episode
1987	The Corner House	Mr. Cobham	1 episode
1988	Dramarama	Man in Audience	1 episode
1988-90	Chelmsford 123	Blag	13 episodes
1989-94	Maid Marian and Her Merry Men	Rabies	26 episodes
1996	Harry's Mad	Gaston	4 episodes
2000	The Bill	Landlord	1 episode
2000	The Queen's Nose	Cafe Owner	1 episode
2003	Casualty	Lee Stanton	1 episode
2003	Keen Eddie	Uncle Leon	1 episode
2007	Coming Up	Tom	1 episode
2007	My Family	Uncle Idris	1 episode

== Films ==
Lewis appeared in several films, again mostly in minor roles. Notable film appearances included Terry Gilliam's 1985 film Brazil, where he played one of the Black Maria guards, and as one of Robin Hood's followers in the 1991 film Robin Hood: Prince of Thieves, playing a character named Hal.

He also appeared in the 1992 Oscar-nominated semi-biographical film Chaplin, and was the original voice of Obelix in the 1994 film of Asterix Conquers America to Craig Charles' Asterix. In 2005, he played the part of Lillas Pastia, the innkeeper, in Bizet's Carmen at the Royal Albert Hall, London, and in 2007, played alongside Warwick Davis in the film Small Town Folk.

Year	Title	Role	Notes
1980	The Mouse and the Woman	Doctor	
1983	Fords on Water	Man in Toilets	
1985	Brazil	Second Black Maria Guard	
1991	Robin Hood: Prince of Thieves	Hal	
1992	Chaplin	Workhouse Official #1	
1993	Shadowlands	Tea Room Waiter	
1994	Asterix Conquers America	Obelix	Original version, Voice
1998	The Tichborne Claimant	The Hotel Manager	
2000	Quills	First Vendor	
2001	Girl from Rio	Taxi Driver 2	
2003	Chaos and Cadavers	Cabbie	
2004	The Baby Juice Express	Kent	
2007	Small Town Folk	Knackerman #1	

== Death ==
In an interview with the Scottish Mail on Sunday in late 2017, Lewis confirmed he had been diagnosed with dementia. His fellow actor and friend Tony Robinson announced on Twitter on 22 January 2018 that Lewis had died on 20 January 2018.

On 28 January 2018, it was reported that police in Edinburgh were investigating the circumstances surrounding the actor's death after his step-daughter Debora Milazzo claimed he had been placed on a regime of high-dose sedatives and maximum-strength opiate painkillers, and had been needlessly placed on the kind of treatment plan that would be prescribed for the terminal phase of a malignant disease, explaining that her stepfather had not received a terminal diagnosis. Police Scotland confirmed it was investigating the complaint, but later determined that Lewis's death was from natural causes.
