= Forbes Collins =

British actor (born 1941)

- Born: David Collins; 29 July 1941 (age 85); London, England
- Occupation: Actor

Forbes Collins (born 29 July 1941) is a British actor.

He is best known for his role as King John in the popular comedy Maid Marian and Her Merry Men. He also starred in the episode All About Scoring, Innit? in the drama, Minder, playing Arklow, as well as appearing as Jonas in Jesus of Nazareth (1977), some episodes of the first series of Blackadder, Worzel Gummidge series 2, episode 4 as Sergeant Beetroot and playing the Chief Officer in Doctor Who's Vengeance on Varos.

Collins also played Zacky Martin in Poldark (1975), playing a leading male member in the village of Sawle and supporter of Captain Poldark, whose house Nampara was nearby. When the villagers of Sawle try one of their own for murder, Zacky is prominent in leading the process, advocating using "the old way". This uses a candle which, should it stop burning before the end, is taken as 'proof' of guilt. With 'sentence' passed, as the 'guilty' man (who professes his genuine guilt) is taken away, the viewer sees that the wick in the candle had been pre-cut, and the flame would have naturally extinguished anyway. In the quietly memorable and chilling scene that follows, the 'guilty' man is hurled from the cliffs to his death.

Other appearances include the 1974 "Dixon of Dock Green" episode, "Seven For A Secret - Never To Be Told". His character, Pengelly, appears to have withheld information from Dock Green police who are investigating the death of a woman in a gas explosion. He has also played policemen himself, notably Chief Superintendent Bailey in three episodes of the P. D. James-penned Adam Dalgliesh story, "Shroud For A Nightingale" (which TV mini-series starred Roy Marsden as Dalgliesh). His film career includes roles in The Hiding Place (1975), Intimate Games (1976), Black Joy (1977), Gulag (1985), Hitler's SS: Portrait in Evil (1985), Biggles (1986) and The Lady and the Highwayman (1988).

== Filmography ==
Year	Title	Role	Notes
1975	The Hiding Place	Mason Smit	
1976	Intimate Games	Husband	
1977	Black Joy	1st Immigration Officer	
1977	Jesus of Nazareth	Jonas	TV Mini Series
1978	A Horseman Riding by	Tamer Potter	
1979	Tess	New tenant	
1984	John Wycliffe: The Morning Star	Peasant	
1985	Gulag	Luba	TV movie
1985	Hitler's SS: Portrait in Evil	SA-Hauptscharführer	TV movie
1986	Biggles	German Soldier	
1988	Just Ask for Diamond	Henry von Falkenberg	
1988	The Fruit Machine	John Schlesinger	
1988	The Lady and the Highwayman	Krull	TV movie
1989-1994	Maid Marian and Her Merry Men	King John	TV series
