= The Dying Hours =

- Author: Mark Billingham
- Language: English
- Set in: London
- Published: London
- Publisher: Little, Brown (Sphere)
- Publication date: 2013
- Publication place: United Kingdom
- Media type: Hardback, paperback
- Pages: 410
- ISBN: 9781847444240

The Dying Hours is a 2013 book by British author, Mark Billingham. It is one of a series featuring his signature character, Tom Thorne.

== Synopsis ==
Tom Thorne has returned to uniform duties, having been removed from the Murder Squad. Thorne is suspicious of a spate of deaths of elderly people that are officially ruled suicides, and begins investigating alone. Soon, he finds himself on the trail of a serial killer who preys on the elderly.

== Reception ==
In the Tampa Bay Times, the author was described as 'fiendishly clever about subverting our expectations' with the 'breathtaking and surprising climax'. A lengthy feature was published in The Independent while Billingham was also interviewed by The Daily Telegraph and BBC Radio 4.
