= Maid Marian and Her Merry Men =

British children's television series (1989–1994)

- Series 1 DVD cover
- Genre: Sitcom
- Created by: Tony Robinson
- Directed by: David Bell
- Starring: Kate Lonergan; Wayne Morris; Danny John-Jules; Tony Robinson
- Composers: David Chilton; Nick Russell-Pavier
- Country of origin: United Kingdom
- Original language: English
- No. of series: 4
- No. of episodes: 26

Production
- Producer: Richard Callanan
- Cinematography: David Gautier
- Camera setup: Single-camera
- Running time: 25 minutes 1x 50 Minutes
- Production company: BBC

Original release
- Network: BBC1
- Release: 16 November 1989 – 16 February 1994

Maid Marian and her Merry Men is a British children's television series created and written by Tony Robinson and directed by David Bell. It began on 16 November 1989 on BBC1 and ran for four series, with the last episode shown on 16 February 1994. The show was a partially musical comedy retelling of the legend of Robin Hood, placing Maid Marian in the role of leader of the Merry Men, and reducing Robin to an 'incompetent' ex-tailor.

The programme has been likened to Blackadder, not only for its historical setting and the presence of Tony Robinson (as well as early, uncredited, script editing work being undertaken by Richard Curtis), but also for its comic style. Many of the show's cast, such as Howard Lew Lewis, Forbes Collins, John Rapley, Ramsay Gilderdale and Patsy Byrne, had previously appeared in various episodes of Blackadder alongside Robinson.

The show's success led to an adaptation produced for the stage and a cartoon strip by Paul Cemmick which was serialised in the Daily Telegraph's children's paper The Young Telegraph (also available as a series of collections), and the programme was repeated on BBC One in 2001. Series 1 was released on video in 1990 and 1993, with three episodes each on four tapes, and all four series are available on DVD. It was repeated in April 2002 on the CBBC Channel and the first series was repeated in June 2007 at 12:30 on the CBBC Channel. During the summer of 2009, Gold repeated the entire 4 series.

Tony Robinson was in discussion about a revival in 2018, 2021 and 2022.

== Plot elements ==
Many of the plots featured, included or revolved around spoofing particular things, including films such as Jurassic Park and It Came from Outer Space, and television programmes, including The Crystal Maze and the long-running televised fundraisers Children in Need and Comic Relief. There were also frequent references to other Robin Hood incarnations, most notably ITV's Robin of Sherwood (and in particular that series' theme song by Clannad, "Robin (The Hooded Man)" is lampooned in the episode "The Whitish Knight") and the 1991 film Robin Hood: Prince of Thieves. The latter actually features Howard Lew Lewis (Rabies) among its cast.

== Main characters ==
=== Protagonists ===
- Maid Marian (Kate Lonergan): a passionate and idealistic freedom fighter and de facto leader of the "Merry Men" (though this is never recognised by anyone outside the group). She is by far the most intelligent of the gang, but often lets her idealism blind her to reality, most notably the rest of the gang's incompetence. She also is not very patient, but will always defend anyone who she feels is wronged. She often has mud in her hair.
- Robin of Kensington (Wayne Morris): an extremely vain tailor and a yuppie. Came to be seen as the leader of Marian's gang by accident, and remains so because he sees it as a cool image to cultivate. His most significant contribution to the outlaws was nevertheless to insist that they all wear green "to co-ordinate with the trees".
- Barrington (Danny John-Jules): the resident Rasta Merry Man, who would often rap during the episodes' songs. He sometimes acts as a kind of semi-omniscient narrator (in a similar manner to Alan-a-Dale in more traditional versions). Barrington's name may be a reference to Jamaican musician Barrington Levy, due to his 1980 album titled Robin Hood.
- Little Ron (Mike Edmonds): a very short, aggressive and violent Merry Man who usually faces the wrong way in ambushes. A parody of Little John. He is the second strongest Merry Man of the group, beaten only by Rabies.
- Rabies (Howard Lew Lewis): another Merry Man, very strong, and very stupid, although with his heart in the right place.

=== Antagonists ===
- King John (Forbes Collins): who also played John's brother, Richard the Lionheart, in the episode "The Whitish Knight", and Queen Eleanor, Guy of Gisbourne's mother: a violent and unstable monarch. He is narcissistic and insecure, and becomes very angry at the thought of being unpopular with the peasants. His brother, who was thought to be a wise ruler who would bring England back to a Golden Age, is identical.
- The Sheriff of Nottingham (Tony Robinson): a devious plotter obsessed with collecting taxes. Given the first name 'Arnold' in the episode "Keeping Mum", ostensibly only to produce a later pun (Arnold being a suburb of Nottingham). While he is dedicated to stopping Marian, they sometimes find themselves in sympathy with each other regarding the complete stupidity of everyone else.
- Gary and Graeme (Mark Billingham and David Lloyd): guards of the King's castle, and the Sheriff's henchmen. They are "bestest mates" and extremely affable, but in the tradition of clever villains with idiot sidekicks, not very clever most of the time. They are often very friendly with the Merry Men, who tend to return the sentiment – except when Gary and Graeme are doing what they are paid for. Graeme has a (never seen) brother called Kevin. Graeme tends to enjoy things like torture and teasing the villagers more than Gary does, though Gary will challenge Graeme for the chance to do executions. Gary is shown as completely devoted to his job, to the point of obsession; when sacked, he refused to leave the Sheriff's side and carried on as though he had not been fired.
- Guy of Gisbourne (Ramsay Gilderdale): King John's wet-behind-the-ears nephew, who has come to live with him at the insistence of his mother, the king's older sister, Queen Eleanor. A village idiot, and mummy's boy, Guy is widely held in contempt by the heroes and villains alike. He is aged 27 but seems to have a mental age of about 5, and has an imaginary friend and occasionally dresses in a tutu. He is forever talking gibberish to himself and making irrelevant and meaningless interjections during the baddies' councils. King John does not want to be saddled with his nephew, but obeys his sister's orders out of fear that she will "do that nasty thing with the pencils" to him, just as she used to when they were children.
- "Rotten" Rose Scargill (Siobhan Fogarty): rival to Maid Marian and both Marian's best friend and worst enemy. She is Robin Hood's biggest fan.

== Secondary characters ==
- Gladys and Snooker (Hilary Mason and Robin Chandler): two villagers of Worksop. Gladys is an elderly (and extremely stupid) peasant, fond of telling stories and legends, and hanging out with Barrington. She is Worksop's "wise old woman", but admits to being underqualified. Snooker (who also gets called "Stinker") is another extremely stupid peasant, who appears to be about 40. His greatest claim to fame is apparently inventing a game involving a long stick, a table, and a number of coloured balls. Together, they serve as the mouthpieces of the village, but are generally no more intelligent than the peasants they speak for.
- Nettle (Kerry Potter): a young female villager, who is definitely the equal of Marian in intelligence.
- Chickweed (Karen Salt): a very young peasant girl.
- Hayley (Carly Britnell): another young intelligent female villager. She had a comet named after her after she vomited as it shot across the sky. Her appearance is in "Hayley's Vomit".
- The Beast of Bolsover: a reference to the nickname of Dennis Skinner, then the Labour Party Member of Parliament for Bolsover and member of the Socialist Campaign Group. Tony Robinson is a well-known Labour Party supporter, and was elected to the Labour Party's National Executive Committee in 2000.
- Eric "The Newt" Teasel: an archer, appearing in the episode "Robert The Incredible Chicken". From Epping Forest.
- Cowpat: a pretty young village woman. She is a friend of Rose, and one of Robin's many fans. She appeared in "Rotten Rose (Part One)".
- Clough: a tall, red haired and bearded village man, from Nottingham forest and sometimes seen about Worksop. Participated in the archery contest. The character name is a reference to Brian Clough, manager of English football team Nottingham Forest at the time.
- Nigel Pargetter: semi-regularly appearing but uncredited peasant (actually Martin [Wills] O'Toole) who fell victim to a number of misfortunes, including being punched in the head several times, being crushed by a radiator during Bloopy, and having a large cucumber lodged in his head by Robin's lookalike. He is named after a well-known character in long-running BBC Radio 4 soap opera, The Archers.
- "Little Girl" (Kellie Bright): often found close to Gladys in the first series.
- "Mad Prisoner" (Christopher Nichol)

== Music ==
The music and songs for Maid Marian and Her Merry Men were composed by Nick Russell-Pavier and David Chilton. Each episode contained either one or two songs, which were mostly originals but were sometimes parodies. According to commentaries on the DVDs, the actors were frequently dubbed in their singing voices, both by themselves and (more often) by professional singers in post-filming studio sessions. Gary, Graeme, Guy and Barrington almost always sing their own songs, however.

=== Series One: 1989 ===
1. How The Band Got Together: "Mud" (sung by Barrington)
2. Robert The Incredible Chicken: "The Story So Far" (sung by Barrington); "The Sheriff's Excuse" (sung by Barrington)
3. A Game Called John: "Pancake Day" (sung by Barrington)
4. The Miracle of St Charlene: "Gotta Get Across" (sung by Barrington, Marian, Robin, Rabies and Little Ron)
5. The Sharp End of a Cow: "Popular" (sung by the Peasants)
6. The Whitish Knight: "The White Knight / The Whitish Knight" (a take-off on "Robin (The Hooded Man)", the theme song to the ITV series Robin of Sherwood)

=== Series Two: 1990 ===
1. The Beast of Bolsover: "Ambush" (sung by Barrington)
2. The Worksop Egg Fairy: "What Is Happening Here?" (sung by Barrington); "Bop for an Egg" (sung by Barrington and the Peasants)
3. Little Brown Noses: "Against The Law" (sung by Barrington); "Colin's Release Song" (a take on Band Aid; sung by Marian, Robin, Barrington and Rabies)
4. Rabies in Love: "Rabies in Love"; "Wedding Today" (sung by Nettle and the Peasants)
5. Rotten Rose (Part One): "Robin Hood" (a take-off on Bananarama; sung by Rose, Gladys and Cowpat)
6. Rotten Rose (Part Two): "Rotten Rose" (sung by Barrington)

=== Series Three: 1993 ===
1. The Big Baby: "Father Bloopy" (sung by The Sheriff, Gary, Graeme and the Peasants); "Don't Worry 'Bout The Pain" (sung by Barrington, Marian, Robin and the Peasants)
2. Driving Ambition: "Boring" (sung by Barrington and the Peasants – note line by Marian "Stop miming"); "Take Action" (sung by Barrington, Robin and Rabies); "A Friend Like Rose" (sung by Marian and Barrington)
3. Keeping Mum: "Pierced" (sung by The Sheriff and the Peasants); "Call The Dentist" (a take-off on the Ghostbusters theme song; sung by Barrington and the Peasants); "Hurrah for the State of Luxembourg" (sung a cappella by Gary and Graeme)
4. They Came From Outer Space: "Only Child" (sung by Marian, Barrington, Rabies and Little Ron); "Naked to the Visible Eye" (sung by Barrington and the Peasants)
5. Robin and the Beansprout: "I Wish They'd Put Their Heads Outside" (sung by Barrington, Marian, Little Ron and Rabies); "Chop Suey" (a take-off on Elvis Presley's "In the Ghetto"; sung by Robin and the Peasants)
6. The Great Mud Harvest: "White Suit" (sung by Robin, Barrington and the Peasants)

=== Christmas Special: 1993 ===
1. Maid Marian and Much the Mini-Mart Manager's Son: "Much The Mini-Mart Manager's Son" (sung by Barrington); "Deception" (a take-off on Michael Jackson; sung by Barrington and one of the show's regular session musicians, appearing on-screen for the first time – note the line 'It's not him that's singing...')

=== Series Four: 1994 ===
1. Tunnel Vision: "Double Trouble" (sung by Barrington and Robin)
2. Bouncy Sheriff: "Friends Or Foes?" (sung by Rose, Marian, The Sheriff, Gary, Graeme and the Peasants)
3. Raining Forks: "Vacation" (sung by The Sheriff, King John, Robin, Barrington, Gary, Graeme and the Peasants); "High Forks Night" (a take-off on the Rolling Stones; sung by Barrington, Robin and Guy)
4. The Wise Woman of Worksop: "Here Comes Pixie Paul" (a take-off on Paul McCartney; sung by Rabies, Barrington and Little Ron)
5. Robin The Bad: "Thicky Stupid" (sung by Robin and the Peasants); "A Selection of Amusing Things" (sung by The Sheriff and the Peasants)
6. The Nice Sumatran: "The King of England Is a Pig" (sung by the coronation choir); "Party People Party" (a take-off on Lionel Richie; sung by Barrington and the Peasants); "Take My Heart" (a take-off on Frank Sinatra; sung by Snooker)
7. Voyage to the Bottom of the Forest: "You're So Lazy" (sung by Marian, Robin, Barrington and Little Ron); "The Story of Workflop" [sic] (sung by The Sheriff, Gary and Graeme)

== Awards ==
Maid Marian and Her Merry Men won several awards, including the 1990 BAFTA for "Best Children's Programme (Entertainment/Drama)". It was also nominated for the same award in 1991, losing to Press Gang. The programme also won at least one award from the Royal Television Society, as well as the prestigious "Prix Jeunesse Variety Award" at the International Children's Programme Festival in Munich.

== Locations ==
The programme was set in the very real Nottinghamshire town of Worksop, which, along with Mansfield, is one of the two closest modern day towns to the Major Oak, although the whole show was shot in Somerset. The outside scenes were filmed in woods at Porlock, near Minehead, and the castle scenes were filmed in Cleeve Abbey. The beach at Porlock features in some of the episodes including The Whitish Knight.

== Video and DVD releases ==
=== Video ===
- Series 1 was released in four volumes of 3 episodes each (a couple of slight variations in cover design exist for each). In keeping with other BBC video releases of the time, such as Blackadder, each volume was named after an episode:
  - "Maid Marian and Her Merry Men: How the Band Got Together" featured episodes 1-3 (BBCV 4424). Released: 5 November 1990
  - "Maid Marian and Her Merry Men: The Miracle of St Charlene" featured episodes 4-6 (BBCV 4425). Released: 5 November 1990
  - "Maid Marian and Her Merry Men Re Release: How the Band Got Together" featured episodes 1-3 (BBCV 4424). Released: 8 February 1993
  - "Maid Marian and Her Merry Men Re Release: The Miracle of St Charlene" featured episodes 4-6 (BBCV 4425). Released: 8 February 1993

Subsequent series were not released on video.

=== DVD (Region 2) ===
The DVDs were released after much online campaigning and a petition setup by fans c. 2002. Some of the signatures included cast members, although proof of this is now lost.

- Series 1 – Released on 20 March 2006.
- Series 2 – Released on 24 July 2006.
- Series 3 – Released on 23 October 2006 (includes the 1993 Christmas special "Much the Mini-Mart Manager's Son").
- Series 4 – Released on 19 February 2007.
- Series 1-4 Box Set – Released on 22 September 2008.

== Comic books ==
Written (and adapted) by Tony Robinson, illustrated by Paul Cemmick. Published by the BBC and BBC Books Ltd. between 1989 and 1992.

- Maid Marian and Her Merry Men: How the Band got Together (BBC Books (2 November 1989) ISBN 0-563-20808-2
- Maid Marian and Her Merry Men: Robert the Incredible Chicken (BBC Books (2 November 1989) ISBN 0-563-20809-0
- Maid Marian and Her Merry Men: The Whitish Knight (BBC Books (1 October 1990) ISBN 0-563-36040-2
- Maid Marian and Her Merry Men: The Beast of Bolsover (BBC Books (1 October 1990) ISBN 0-563-36041-0
- Maid Marian and Her Merry Men: The Worksop Egg Fairy (BBC Books (3 October 1991) ISBN 0-563-36220-0
- Maid Marian and Her Merry Men: Rabies in Love (BBC Books (3 October 1991) ISBN 0-563-36219-7
- Maid Marian and Her Merry Men: It Came from Outer Space (BBC Books (26 November 1992) ISBN 0-563-36709-1
- Maid Marian and Her Merry Men: Driving Ambition and Keeping Mum (BBC Books (26 November 1992) ISBN 0-563-36710-5

== Other materials ==
The programme was adapted for a stage musical by Tony Robinson, Mark Billingham and David Lloyd. It toured several British theatres. The theatre programme for the production at the Bristol Old Vic featured new artwork by Paul Cemmick, showing Tony Robinson dreaming the production after being hit in the head by a football. The script for this production was later published in book format by Longman literature in 1992, as part of a series of BBC TV (and radio) plays to be used in classrooms at Key Stage 3 level (roughly ages 11–14). The book includes support material and activities for this purpose.

- Maid Marian and Her Merry Men (BBC/Longman (6 August 1992) ISBN 0-582-09554-9

== See also ==
- When Things Were Rotten, 1975 sitcom based upon Robin Hood, created by Mel Brooks
- Blackadder, 1983–1989 historical BBC sitcom featuring Tony Robinson as Baldrick
- List of films and television series featuring Robin Hood
