= Genie in the House =

British television series

- Also known as: You Wish (original pilot)
- Created by: Phil Ox; Isabelle Dubernet; Eric Fuhrer; Steven Bawol
- Directed by: Phil Ox; Steven Bawol
- Starring: Wayne Morris; Katie Sheridan; Vicky Longley; Jordan Metcalfe; Angus Kennedy; Victoria Gay
- Theme music composer: Jean de Aguiar; Kevin Eldon
- Opening theme: There's a Genie in the House
- Ending theme: There's a Genie in the House [instrumental]
- Country of origin: United Kingdom
- Original language: English
- No. of series: 4
- No. of episodes: 78, including specials (list of episodes)

Production
- Producer: Phil Ox
- Running time: 28 minutes
- Production companies: Moi J'Aime La Television S.A; Helion Pictures

Original release
- Network: Nickelodeon UK
- Release: 29 May 2006 – 4 December 2010

Genie in the House is a British sitcom that broadcast on Nickelodeon UK about a widowed father (Philip) with two teenage daughters (Emma and Sophie) who find a golden lamp while exploring the loft of their new home. A rub of the lamp releases Adil, a trainee genie from Balamkadaar who has been confined to life in the lamp for a thousand years. Genie in the House ran for four series, from May 2006 to December 2010, with a total of 78 episodes. The series aired in over 100 countries and in March 2012.

== Production ==
The show is a French/English co-production, produced in English by French company Moi j'aime la television. At one point, You Wish! was considered as a working title, and was used for the pilot show, but it was discovered that there had been an American sitcom, You Wish, with the same name, so Genie in the House was chosen instead. The series was originally recorded in 3 blocks of 26 episodes each using multi camera setups that enabled the recording of 2 episodes a week over a 13-week period for each series.

In 2010 the original cast were involved in a 3D rendition of "Genie in the House" in preparation for a planned Genie In The House Feature Film which in the end never came to be made.

The show's theme song was written especially for the show, with music by Jean de Aguiar and lyrics by Kevin Eldon. It is sung by Lorraine Pearson.

The show has been sold, sometimes in dubbed form, to Turkey (Turkish), France (French), Belgium (Walloon/Flemish), Italy (Italian), Spain (Castilian), Portugal (Portuguese), Russia (Russian), Ukraine (Ukrainian), India (Hindi), the Netherlands (Dutch) and Germany (German). Filming for the third and final series took place at Twickenham Film Studios, London, and began in June 2008, ending with a 3 part story 'The Legend of The Dragon', with a teleplay by one of the main series writers Bennett Arron who also had a cameo role as The Great Suprendo. It was filmed on location in Paris and the nearby countryside and was the only story filmed outside the Studio.

=== Soundtrack ===
- There's a Genie in the House by Lorraine Pearson (theme song only)
- Tropical Girl by Kevin McDermott
- The Pineapple Song by Ayshea

== Episodes ==
Series	Episodes	Originally released	
Series	Episodes	First released	Last released
1	26	29 May 2006	7 May 2007
2	26	5 November 2007	27 May 2008
3	11	3 November 2008	5 January 2009
4	15	10 August 2009	4 December 2010

== Characters ==
- Adil the Genie (Jordan Metcalfe) — Adil was born in the 4th century in the suburbs of the city of Balamkadaar. He has the outward appearance of a 15-year-old boy but has actually lived for 1,500 years. His father was a genie and his mother was a teacher of the Dance of the Seven Veils. Adil attended the School for Genie Arts and Sciences where, as a first-year student, he accidentally got stuck in a lamp, which was then stolen from the school that night, and forgotten in Ali Baba's cave for around 100 years. The lamp passed from hand to hand, before being found in the attic of the Norton family's home. As Adil was a poor student and did not finish his Genie studies, he is rarely able to carry out wishes exactly as intended.
- Philip Norton (Adam Morris) — Philip is a talented and successful designer, and father to Emma and Sophie. He is often overworked by his boss, Max, and occasionally struggles to balance work and parenting. He has forbidden Adil from granting wishes for Emma and Sophie, at the risk of serious punishment for his daughters and locking Adil in the lamp for a weekend. Nonetheless, he has a good relationship with Adil, and encourages him to become a sports fan.
- Sophie Norton (Katie Sheridan) — Sophie is the older of the sisters. She is a keen student, who loves physics, chemistry, history and geography and looks forward to attending university and studying further. She also spends her free time busy with educational and sporting activities, and is mostly uninterested in romance and male attention. Sophie enjoys spending time with Adil because he asks lots of questions about the world. She occasionally disobeys her father by asking Adil for wishes, but takes care not to be detected.
- Emma Norton (Vicky Longley) — The younger of the sisters by a year, Emma finds school intensely boring, and does the bare minimum to pass. However, she does enjoy reading and creative subjects. She spends her free time socialising with friends, engaged in creative pursuits, or on normal teenage activities such as shopping, partying and dating. Her favourite topic of conversation is boys. She enjoys Adil's company mostly due to his outlandish stories. She enjoys asking Adil to grant wishes, despite the risks of his poor magic skills.

== Recurring characters ==
- Max Baxter (Angus Kennedy) Series 1-4 - Max Baxter, referred to as Uncle Max, is an old school friend of Philip Norton and employs Philip in his business - Max Baxter industries, as an industrial designer. Philip is constantly coming up with designs for products while Max takes the credit. Max is a regular visitor to the Norton household and gets caught up in various story lines. Max is unaware of Adil's magic powers and thinks that he is just a strange exchange student. Max is pompous and self important and is constantly getting both himself and Philip into trouble through his foolishness.
- Caroline Smart (Victoria Gay) Series 1 — Caroline is Philip's helping hand around the house and with the girls. Although she lives next door, she has a key allowing her to come and go as necessary. She and Philip have a developing romantic attraction to each other. Caroline did not return after Series 1 and she was said to have moved to France and married.
- Clive (Darren John) Series 2-4 - Clive was introduced in Series 2 as the love interest for Sophie. His and Sophie's relationship is constantly being thwarted by events around the Norton family.
- Mr Preston (Philip Fox) Series 2-4 - Mr Preston is the headmaster of the high school attended by Sophie and Emma. Several stories involving the girls while at school mean that Mr Preston also becomes involved.
- Owen (Theo Fraiser Steele) Series 2-4 - Owen is the owner of the juice bar that Sophie and Emma both work. Some episodes revolve around happenings at the juice bar.
- Peggy (Arabella Weir) Series 2 - Peggy was introduced as the troublesome and nosey neighbour who finds herself involved in some of the events in the house. Peggy did not return in later series.

=== Other characters ===
- Abdab (Nicholas Khan) (Series 1–2)
- Aisha (Leyla Pellegrini)
- Alex Delaney (Shamus Iqbal)
- Ali Baba (Peter Peralta)
- Anabell Scott (Hannah Tointon) (Series 1)
- Bonnie Swift (Georgia Slowe)
- Dancer (Pixie Lott) (Series 1 Episode 14)
- Djamola (Deborah Alobah)
- Elmer Norton (Glyn Angell) (Series 3)
- Frank McCartney (David McMullen)
- Harold (Jack Blumenau) (Series 1)
- Hunk (Glyn Angell)
- Jamilla (Susan Kyd)
- Lady Isabella (Elizabeth Conboy)
- Len (Alexander Wilson)
- Lindy Lou (Kristal Archer)
- Mamoun (Matthew Leitch)
- Melissa Fox (Ellen Lister) (Series 2)
- Miss Mayer (Katy Bartrop)
- Mr Hull (Richard Freeman)
- Mr. Osterman (Johnnie Lyne-Pirkis), Austrian-born
- The Mummy (Tom Underwood)
- Nanette (Olivia Caffrey)
- Nev (Harry Lloyd)
- Raza Matas Jay Simon
- Reject #1 (Danielle Mitchell)
- Reject #2 (Eleanor Wild)
- Reject #3 (Kayleigh Batchelor)
- Reject #4 (Lyneah Johnson)
- Prince Otto (Nathan Guy)
- Prince Otto's courtier (Eric Kolelas)
- Radio Presenter Jay Simon
- Royal hunk (Joshua Bowman)
- School friend (Jermaine Lynch)
- Shona (Jessica Ashworth)
- Sophie's PA (Naomi Heffernan)
- Atom, boyband member and dancer (Tom Andrew Hargreaves)
