= Mark Billingham =

English actor, comedian, novelist, and television screenwriter (born 1961)

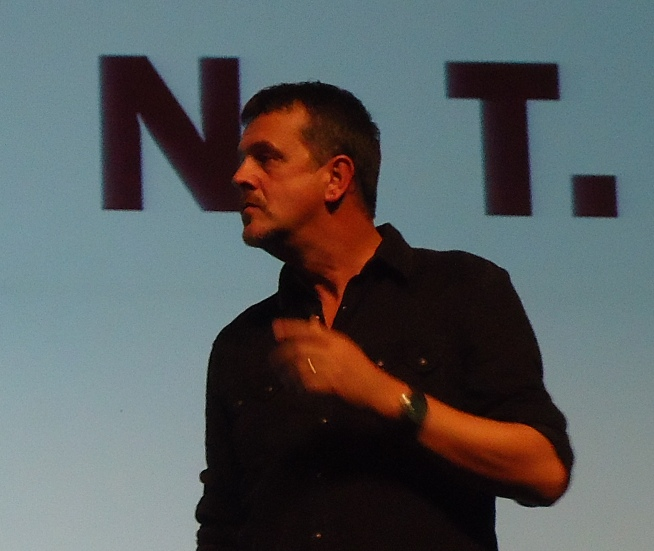
- Billingham in 2013
- Born: Mark Philip David Billingham; 2 July 1961 (age 65); Solihull, West Midlands, England
- Occupations: Actor, comedian, novelist
- Children: 2
- Writing career
- Period: 1987–present
- Genre: Crime fiction
- Notable work: The Tom Thorne novels
- Website: www.markbillingham.com

Mark Philip David Billingham (born 2 July 1961) is an English actor, comedian, novelist and television screenwriter. He is known for the "Tom Thorne" crime novel series.

== Early life ==
Billingham was born on 2 July 1961 in Solihull, West Midlands and grew up in Moseley, Birmingham. He attended King Edward VI Camp Hill School for Boys in nearby King's Heath, and lived in that general area in his youth, until attending the nearby University of Birmingham, where he graduated from the Department of Drama and Theatre Arts in 1983.

== Comedy and acting ==
After graduating with a degree in drama from the Department of Drama and Theatre Arts, he helped form a socialist theatre company, Bread & Circuses, in Birmingham. Bread & Circuses toured with shows in schools, colleges, arts centres and the street. In the mid-1980s he moved to London as a "jobbing actor", taking minor roles in episodes of TV shows Dempsey and Makepeace, Juliet Bravo, Boon, and The Bill. After playing a variety of "bad guy roles such as a soccer hooligan, drug addict, a nasty copper, a racist copper or a bent copper", he claimed that he had become disenchanted with acting and that the emphasis was not on talent, but on looks.

Around 1987 he decided to pursue a career in comedy, stating:"[The] one great advantage of stand-up comedy [is that] nobody gives a stuff about what you look like – as long as you're funny, and if you can do it, and people laugh, then you'll get bookings." Billingham cites his breaking into stand-up as a simple progression from 5-minute, unpaid "try-out" spots to 10-, 20- and 30-minute paid slots. Billingham has headlined at the Comedy Store, where he also appears regularly as a Master of Ceremonies.

In 1988, he appeared in the children's comedy series News at Twelve.

=== Maid Marian and Her Merry Men ===
In Maid Marian and Her Merry Men, Billingham played Gary, a dim-but-lovable guard in the employ of the Sheriff of Nottingham (Tony Robinson), as part of a double-act with Graeme (David Lloyd).

After three award-winning series, Billingham and Lloyd helped creator-writer Robinson with plot and script ideas and gained co-writer credits on the first episode of series 4, "Tunnel Vision".

Robinson, Lloyd and Billingham remain friends, and Robinson is partially credited for Billingham's literary career on the DVD release of Maid Marian (Series 3), in which the three discuss writing for the series and in general. The trio announced in 2018 that they were working on a stage production of Maid Marian and Her Merry Men.

== Writing ==
From an early age, Billingham wrote often "funny" stories for popularity and enjoyment. As his interests moved towards crime fiction, he set an early novel (the unpublished The Mechanic) in his native Birmingham. Inspired by the comic-crime work of Carl Hiaasen and other authors, he attempted to use his experience as a stand-up comedian and crime fan to write a similarly comic novel. Ultimately he abandoned the unfinished novel and the comic-crime genre to focus on another book that would become Sleepyhead.

Billingham has stated in interviews that he treats comedy, and stand-up in particular, and writing as parts of a whole, as they use "the same 'Tricks'... [in particular] a strong opening." He also cites the big ending, and "pullback and reveal", whereby the audience or reader is led along a specific path and lulled into thinking that they can guess the twist, before "boom! it hits them from over there". In comedy, he says, it is a punchline; in crime "something a whole lot darker... [but] essentially it's a similar kind of [misdirection] technique."

Billingham also writes comedy scripts for television. He and David Lloyd wrote and acted in the children's TV series Harry's Mad, based on the book by Dick King-Smith), and wrote and presented two series of BBC's What's That Noise?. Between 1997 and 1998, he and friend Peter Cocks wrote and co-starred in Granada TV's Knight School, for which they also produced a novelisation. He claims to be less interested in scriptwriting than novel writing.

In 2002, he was "in the middle of writing a screenplay for an Andrew Lloyd Webber musical and about to write a screenplay for a cult children's show," a sci-fi drama for the BBC, but turned to writing novels.

=== Novels ===
In 2001, Billingham's first crime novel, Sleepyhead, was published in the UK by Little, Brown and Company. He is a self-confessed fan of crime fiction, "as well as a really serious collector" and has stated that the expense of collecting books inspired him to get into interviewing and reviewing books, partly for the complimentary copies. Starting with a local newspaper, he progressed to providing reviews and interviews for SHOTS, and then to magazines, including Time Out, where he interviewed Michael Connelly and others.

Billingham became the first crime writer to win the Theakston's Old Peculier Crime Novel of the Year Award twice when his novel Death Message won in 2009, against Reginald Hill, Val McDermid, Ian Rankin and Lee Child.

==== Tom Thorne ====
Billingham's detective character Inspector Tom Thorne first appeared in his 2001 debut novel Sleepyhead. The character has since appeared in the majority of his works, except In the Dark, Rush of Blood, and Die of Shame (May 2016), in which Thorne has minor roles. Billingham claims to have imbued Thorne with many of his own characteristics, such as a birthday, a locale (London), and a "love of country music both alt and cheesy".

In talking about the creation and development of Thorne, Billingham details his difficulty in trying to create a character different from those in other, popular works:

[You] worry that you will be entering that world of the strange cliche-ed cop, but you soon realise that you have to get comfortable in that world. You think "Hang on, some of the clichés are part of that territory". It would like writing a Western and going "Oh no I've given him a horse! What a terrible cliché!" It's not a cliché – It's part and parcel of the genre – cowboys have six-guns, horses and stetsons and detectives have [a] past... problems [and] flaws, because if they don't, then there is nothing to read about.

Sleepyhead was released in August 2001 and made it onto the Sunday Times "Top Ten Bestseller" list. In December 2009 it was listed as one of the 100 novels that shaped the decade and was chosen as one of the titles for World Book Night in 2011.

Billingham offers the first chapter of each Tom Thorne book on his website.

In 1997, Billingham and his writing partner Peter Cocks were kidnapped and held hostage in a Manchester hotel room. The two were bound and gagged in their hotel room by three masked men who robbed them. Billingham recalls being terrified by the audacity of the criminals, and later used the event as inspiration for his second Thorne novel, Scaredy Cat.

The general theme of Scaredy Cat is really the power of fear, and that fear is a very powerful weapon, and if you are prepared to instil it, you have a very powerful weapon that is every bit as dangerous as a gun or a knife. Also what happened to me in that hotel room fed directly into a sub-plot in Scaredy Cat with some very nasty crimes carried out in hotel rooms.

=== Television adaptations ===
Sky1's Thorne adaptation started broadcasting in October 2010, with actor David Morrissey starring as Tom Thorne. The first three episodes were an adaptation of Sleepyhead and were directed by Stephen Hopkins (24, Californication, The Life and Death of Peter Sellers). The final three episodes were an adaptation of Scaredy Cat, and guest-starred Canadian actress Sandra Oh.

His standalone novel In The Dark was adapted as a miniseries of the same name by the BBC in 2017. An adaptation of another standalone novel, Rush of Blood, is being developed for US television.

== Podcasts ==
In September 2015 Billingham and co-host Michael Carlson released the six-part podcast The Crime Vault Live, with the last episode released in January 2016.

Billingham hosts UKTV's crime podcast A Stab in the Dark. Each episode includes a discussion on a particular theme from crime fiction and crime drama, and has featured guests including David Morrissey, Val McDermid, Michael Connelly and Ann Cleeves.

== Awards and nominations ==
=== Television ===
What's That Noise (which he wrote and presented) won the 1995 Royal Television Society award for "Best Entertainment Programme", while Knight School was nominated for the RTS's "Best Children's Drama" award two years running.

=== Novels ===
Scaredy Cat (2002) won the Sherlock Award for "Best Detective Novel Created by a UK Author", and was also nominated for the Crime Writers' Association Gold Dagger for "Best Crime Novel of the Year". Lifeless (2005) was nominated for BCA "Crime Thriller of the Year" Award in 2006.

Billingham's novel Lazybones won the Theakston's Old Peculier Crime Novel of the Year Award 2004 and he won the same award in 2009 for his novel Death Message. In The Dark was nominated for the Crime Writers' Association Gold Dagger at the 2009 Crime Thriller Awards. In 2011, Billingham was inducted into the ITV3 Crime Thriller Awards Hall of Fame.

Billingham was shortlisted for the 2015 Dagger in the Library UK Crime Writers' Association award for an author's body of work in British libraries. He was shortlisted again in 2019 and won the award in 2022.

In 2021, at the Harrogate Crime Writing Festival, he was awarded the Theakston's Old Peculier Award for Outstanding Contribution to the genre; an award previously presented to Colin Dexter, PD James, Val McDermid, Lee Child and Michael Connelly among others.

In 2026, Billingham was awarded the Diamond Dagger by the Crime Writers Association. This is the most prestigious award the CWA can give and is awarded for a lifetime's contribution to crime fiction.

== Personal life ==
Billingham lives in North London with his wife Claire and their two children. He supports Wolverhampton Wanderers.

== Bibliography ==
- Knight School (with Peter Cocks) (Hodder & Stoughton, 1998), ISBN 0-340-74338-7

=== As "Will Peterson" (with Peter Cocks) ===
- Triskellion (Walker Books Ltd, February 2008), ISBN 1-4063-0709-2
- Triskellion 2: The Burning (Walker Books, February 2009), ISBN 978-1-4063-0710-8
- Triskellion 3: The Gathering (Walker Books, February 2010)

=== Tom Thorne novels ===
1. Sleepyhead (Little, Brown & Company, August 2001), ISBN 0-316-85697-5; William Morrow US, July 2002, ISBN 0-06-621299-5
2. Scaredy Cat (Little, Brown & Company, July 2002), ISBN 0-316-85954-0; Time Warner UK, November 2002, ISBN 0-356-23206-9; William Morrow US, June 2003, ISBN 0-06-621300-2
3. Lazybones (Little, Brown & Company, July 2003), ISBN 0-316-72493-9; ISBN 0-316-72494-7; William Morrow US (June 2004), ISBN 0-06-056085-1
4. The Burning Girl (Little, Brown & Company, July 2004), ISBN 0-316-72574-9; William Morrow US (June 2005), ISBN 0-06-074526-6
5. Lifeless (Little, Brown & Company, May 2005), ISBN 0-316-72752-0; Scorpion Press, June 2005, ISBN 1-873567-70-7; William Morrow US, September 2006, ISBN 0-06-084166-4
6. Buried (Little, Brown & Company, May 2006), ISBN 0-316-73050-5; Orbit, May 2006, ISBN 0-356-24410-5; (HarperCollins, August 2007), ISBN 0-06-125569-6
7. Death Message (Little, Brown & Company, August 2007), ISBN 0-316-73052-1
8. Bloodline (Little, Brown & Company, August 2009), ISBN 978-1-4087-0067-9
9. From the Dead (Little, Brown & Company, August 2010), ISBN 978-1-4087-0075-4
10. Good as Dead (Little, Brown & Company, August 2011), ISBN 978-1-84744-419-6. Retitled US The Demands (Mulholland Books, June 2012), ISBN 978-0-316-12663-2
11. The Dying Hours (2013)
12. The Bones Beneath (2014)
13. Time of Death (2015)
14. Love Like Blood (2017)
15. The Killing Habit (2018)
16. Their Little Secret (2019)
17. Cry Baby (prequel to Sleepyhead) (2020)
18. The Murder Book (2022)
19. What The Night Brings (2025)

=== Declan Miller novels ===
1. The Last Dance (Sphere, May 2023), ISBN 9781408717127
2. The Wrong Hands (Sphere, May 2024), ISBN 9781408717134
3. The Shadow Step
  - Hardback: Sphere, Jul 2026, ISBN 9781408722022
  - Paperback: Sphere, Feb 2027, ISBN 9781408722053

=== Other crime fiction ===
- In the Dark (Little, Brown & Company, August 2008), ISBN 1-4087-0069-7
  - In the Dark includes Tom Thorne as a minor character.
- "Dancing Towards The Blade" in Men From Boys by John Harvey (ed.) (Arrow Books, September 2004), ISBN 0-09-946152-8
  - Other contributors include: Dennis Lehane • Michael Connelly • George Pelecanos • Jeffery Deaver • Lawrence Block
- "Stroke of Luck" in Like A Charm by Karin Slaughter (ed.) (Century, February 2004), ISBN 1-84413-373-7
  - Other contributors include: Laura Lippman • Lee Child • John Connolly • Lynda La Plante • John Harvey • Peter Robinson • Fidelis Morgan • Val McDermid • Karin Slaughter• Emma Donoghue• Denise Mina • Kelley Armstrong • Jane Haddam
- "Introduction" in The High Window by Raymond Chandler (Penguin)
- Rush of Blood (Little, Brown & Company, August 2012), ISBN 978-1-84744-421-9
  - Rush of Blood contains Tom Thorne as a minor character.
- Die of Shame (Little, Brown & Company, May 2016), ISBN 9780802125255
  - Die of Shame contains Tom Thorne as a minor character.
- Rabbit Hole (Little, Brown & Company, July 2021), ISBN 9781408714744
- I am Nobody (Sphere, July 2027), ISBN 9781408722060

== Partial screenography ==
=== Writer ===
- Maid Marian and Her Merry Men (1989–94)
  - "Tunnel Vision" (1993)
- Harry's Mad (1993–96)
  - various episodes
- Knight School (1997–98)
  - various episodes

=== Actor ===
- Dempsey and Makepeace (1984) – Steve (1985)
- Juliet Bravo (1980) – Doyle (1985)
- Boon (1986) – Policeman (1986)
- News at Twelve (1988) – Wayne Harris (1988)
- The Bill (1984) – Pete (1989)
- Birds of a Feather (1989) – Phil the Plumber (1989)
- Maid Marian and her Merry Men (1989–94) – Gary (1989–94)
- The Upper Hand (1990) – Philly Fingers (1993)
- Harry's Mad (1993–96) – Terry Crumm (1993–96)
- Knight School (1997–98) – Scrubbe (1997–98)
