= Vicky Longley =

English actress and singer

- Born: Victoria Jane Longley; 26 October 1988 (age 37); Bromley, London, England
- Education: Italia Conti Academy of Theatre Arts
- Occupation: Actress
- Years active: 2001–present

Victoria "Vicky" Jane Longley (born 26 October 1988 in Bromley, London) is an English actress and singer.

== Early life ==
Longley trained at the Italia Conti Academy in London for eight years from age eleven.

Longley played Cinderella in Bristol's 2008/09 pantomime Cinderella at the Bristol Hippodrome.

She played Emma Norton in the children's comedy Genie in the House, screened in the UK and The Netherlands on Nickelodeon, and in France on Canal J.

In 2010 she together with other members of the original cast were involved in a 3D rendition of "Genie in the House".

== Television and further work ==
In 2011, Longley appeared as a supporting cast member in the BBC Comedy White Van Man playing the role of "Joanne".

== Filmography ==
Year	Series	Role
2006–2010	Genie in the House	Emma Norton
2011–2012	White Van Man	Joanne
