= Bennett Arron =

Welsh comedian and writer

Bennett Arron is a Welsh writer and stand-up comedian.

== Background ==
Bennett Arron was born in Port Talbot to the only Jewish family in the area, where he humorously states that Anthony Hopkins used to light the fire for his grandparents on the Sabbath, as their Jewish faith prevented them from doing so. Bennett Arron moved to London to attend the drama school, the Academy of Live and Recorded Arts. After leaving drama school he formed the sketch group 4-Ply and toured venues around the country, appearing at the Edinburgh Festival Fringe.

== Career ==
In 1997 Arron was a finalist of the BBC New Comedy Awards, alongside Peter Kay. He is a past winner of the BBC Wales New Writer's Award and the TAPS Comedy Writer of The Year Award.

He has written and starred in the BBC Radio series Bennett Arron is JeWelsh and Bennett Arron Worries About..., both of which were nominated for a Celtic Media Award. He presented the BBC Television Documentary The Kosher Comedian in which he traced his family's roots from Lithuania to South Wales and described a reason for the decline of Jews in Wales. In 2007, he wrote, directed and presented the documentary How Not to Lose Your Identity for Channel 4 which was based on his own experience of identity fraud. In the programme he proved how easy it is to carry out the crime by dumpster diving and social engineering. He even went as far as setting up a stall at a shopping centre, supposedly selling identity theft insurance, but was, in fact, scamming people into revealing all their identity information. He also stole the identity of the then Home Secretary, Charles Clarke and was subsequently arrested. Bennett wrote a memoir of his experience Heard the One About Identity Theft?

Bennett also wrote the romantic comedy novel The Girl From The Discotheque which was described as "Funny from beginning to end" by Ricky Gervais and "A touching, funny, page-turning book about what the heart wants – no matter how irrational. This is romance and comedy with a bruised heart" by Tony Parsons.

Bennett has written comedy material for Hale and Pace, Freddie Starr, The Real McCoy, Large, Stop the World, No Limit, The Varrell and Decker Show, Samstag Nacht, The April Hailer Show, The 11 O'Clock Show, Commercial Breakdown, RI:SE, V Graham Norton and Jack Whitehall's Hit the Road Jack.

Bennett currently plays the part of Morris in the BBC Radio 4 sitcom Alone. which is now in its 4th series

He has also written for situation comedies, including Ed Stone is Dead (starring Richard Blackwood) and Sam's Game (starring Davina McCall and Ed Byrne). He was also one of the main writers on two children's series; The Slammer (BBC One) and Genie in the House (the highest rated programme on Nickelodeon). He also wrote several episodes for the children's sitcom Which Is Witch?

As a stand-up comedian, Bennett has performed at every major venue in the UK as well as performing in the United Arab Emirates, Germany, Poland and Australia. Bennett has supported Ricky Gervais on some of his tour dates.

Most recently Bennett was a presenter on BBC Three Counties Radio and he presented the BBC Wales Radio documentary Bennett Arron's Cymru Knish.

He has been described as "Genuinely Original and Funny" by The Times and "One of the best on the Circuit..... a Welsh Seinfeld" by The Guardian.

As of 2025, Arron has been a professional comedian for almost 27 years. His latest show at the Edinburgh Festival Fringe was described as "full of warmth".

== Publications ==
- Heard the one about identity theft?. Silly Papi. 2015. ISBN 978-0993357107.
- The Girl from the Discotheque. Silly Papi. 2015. ISBN 9780993357114.
