= Gareth Parrington =

British actor

- Education: University of Birmingham
- Occupations: Actor; teacher; snowboarding instructor; resort manager

Gareth Parrington is a television actor.

In the television drama Soldier Soldier, Parrington played James Anderson, the eight-year-old son of Colour Sergeant Ian Anderson (Robert Glenister). On the ITV children's sitcom Harry's Mad (1993–1996), Parrington starred as Harry Holdsworth in series one, two, and four.

A graduate of the University of Birmingham, after acting, Parrington worked as an English teacher in Japan, snowboarding instructor, and resort manager.
