= Savage House and Garden =

Historic house in Tennessee, United States

- U.S. National Register of Historic Places
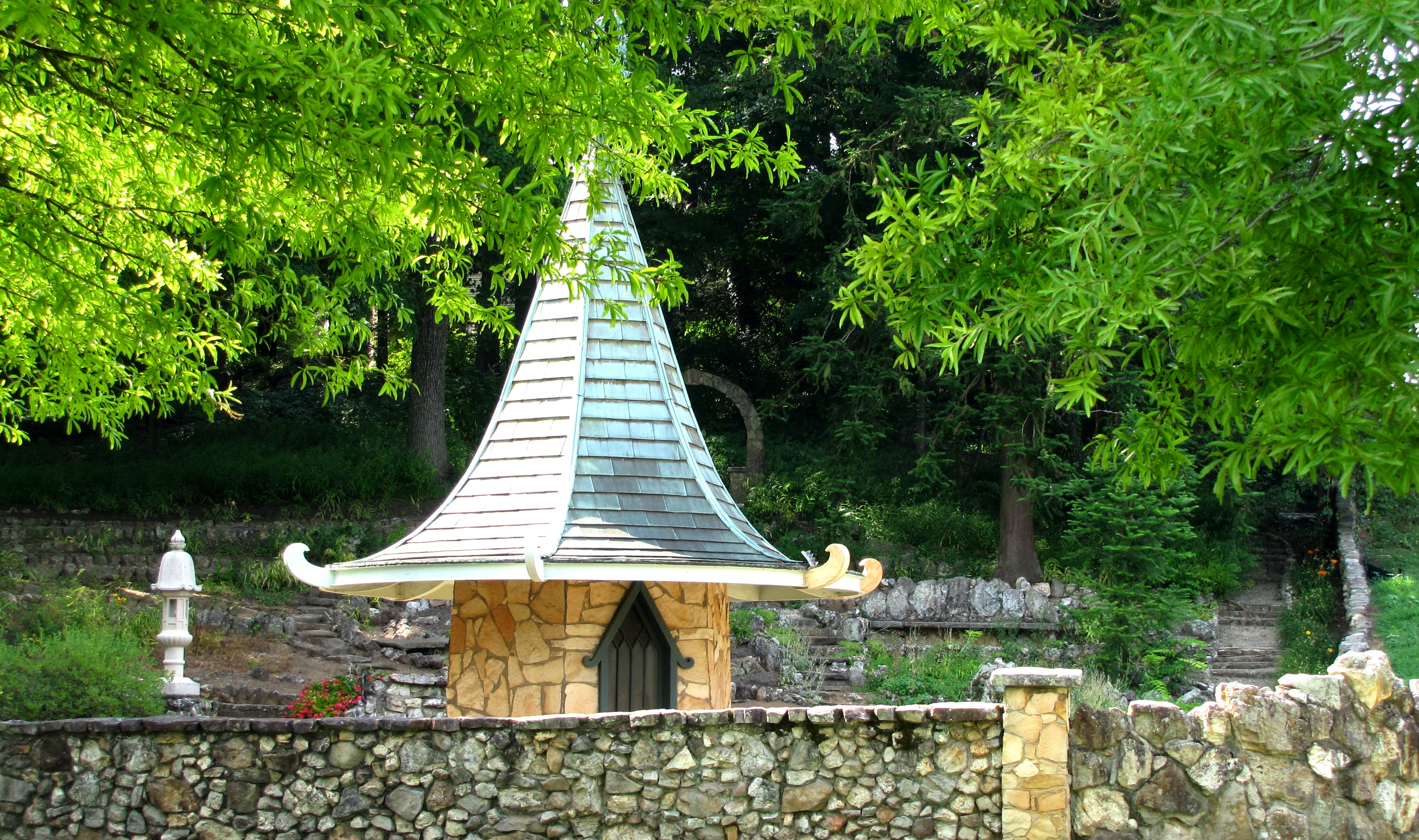
- Savage Garden
- Location: 3237 Garden Dr; Knoxville, Tennessee
- Coordinates: 36°2′30″N 83°55′37″W
- Area: 1.7 acres (0.69 ha)
- Built: circa 1917
- Architect: Arthur Savage
- Architectural style: Bungalow/Craftsman
- MPS: Knoxville and Knox County MPS
- NRHP reference No.: 97001230
- Added to NRHP: October 17, 1997

The Savage House and Garden is a historic home and garden at 3237 Garden Drive in the Fountain City community of Knoxville, Tennessee, United States. Built around 1917 and designed in the Bungalow/Craftsman style, the house and its garden are listed on the National Register of Historic Places.

Arthur Savage (1872–1946), an immigrant from Leamington Spa, England, designed the house and garden during World War I. Along with his older brother, W. J. Savage, Arthur Savage made a small fortune in the early 1900s by manufacturing industrial equipment. Savage was president of the Ty-Sa-Man company, once located in what is now the World's Fair Park, which specialized in the manufacturing of marble-cutting equipment.

Savage loved rock gardens, and established several in East Tennessee, including one in Lake City, along with the one in Fountain City. The Fountain City garden was inspired by Japanese garden designs, which had become popular through the early twentieth century Art Nouveau movement. Work on the garden began around 1917, and was completed sometime during following decade.

In 1937, the Savage Garden was damaged by a tornado, and remained in a state of disrepair for several years. In 1986, the Savage family sold the garden to Bill Dohm and Patty Cooper. Dohm and Cooper have since renovated the garden and restored its fountain. Plant species found in the garden include Japanese Umbrella Pine, Chinese Pistache, Jack-in-the-Pulpit, and Dwarf Crested Iris.
