= Harry's Mad =

British television programme

- Harry's Mad title screen
- Genre: Comedy drama
- Created by: Dick King-Smith
- Written by: Steve Attridge; David Lloyd; Mark Billingham
- Starring: Anthony Asbury (Madison voice); Gareth Parrington (Harry Holdsworth); Jackie Lye (Angie Holdsworth); Mike Walling (John Holdsworth)
- Country of origin: United Kingdom
- Original language: English
- No. of series: 4
- No. of episodes: 36

Production
- Running time: 25 minutes
- Production company: Central Independent Television

Original release
- Network: ITV (CITV)
- Release: 4 January 1993 – 11 March 1996

Harry's Mad is a British children's television programme that aired on CITV in the United Kingdom between 4 January 1993 and 11 March 1996. It is based upon a book written by Dick King-Smith. Whilst Madison is a macaw in this series, in the original book, he is an African grey parrot. Steve Attridge originally adapted the book and wrote most of the first 3 series.

== Premise ==
Madison (animatronic parrot).

The show begins when Harry Holdsworth (Gareth Parrington) inherits his American great-uncle George's macaw named Madison. At first, the Holdsworth family are not very pleased with their new pet, but they soon start to notice that Madison is no ordinary parrot, and that he is highly intelligent and very articulate. He becomes an instant family member. As well as getting the Holdsworths out of many problems, Madison is also the cause of many too. Terry Crumm (Mark Billingham) hears about Madison's intelligence and sets out to steal him on many occasions, but most of the time Madison foils his plans and saves the day.

Harry Holdsworth and Madison (real parrot).

In the third series, the family sell their house and move to a rather run down hotel which they took over when Aunt Agatha moved to America. Harry is studying for his GCSEs back at his old school and so is not featured much in this series. Instead, Hattie, played by Amy Butterworth, and Jools, played by Richard Castillo, Aunt Agatha's adopted children, take his place.

In the fourth and final series, Jools leaves the family and Harry returns from his GCSEs.

Many guest stars appeared in Harry's Mad including Dave Lee Travis, Michaela Strachan and Steve Davis.

== The parrot ==
Madison was played by a living parrot in only certain scenes that required the view of his full body, such as when he was flying or perched on Harry's arm. In most other scenes, however, an animatronic parrot was used to allow Madison to talk and interact with other characters properly. Although the animatronic parrot was mostly accurate, there is one revealing mistake; the animatronic parrot has a uniformly grey beak while the real parrot has a black and white beak.

== Transmissions ==
Series	Start date	End date	Episodes
1	4 January 1993	8 February 1993	6
2	10 January 1994	14 March 1994	9
3	9 January 1995	13 March 1995	10
4	8 January 1996	31 October 1996	11

== Episodes ==
The show ran for four series, which were originally broadcast in 1993, 1994, 1995 and 1996 respectively.

=== Series 1 (1993) ===
No. overall	No. in series	Plot	Original release date
1	1	Harry inherits a parrot called Madison from his great uncle George. There are also secrets of the macaw.	4 January 1993
2	2	Now that Mum and Dad are in on Harry's secret he and Madison are getting along well. Everything seems to be fine until Harry reveals his secret to his parents.	11 January 1993
3	3	Madison the wine drinking Parrot makes some interesting suggestions.	18 January 1993
4	4		25 January 1993
5	5		1 February 1993
6	6		8 February 1993

=== Series 2 (1994) ===
No. overall	No. in series	Title	Original broadcast date
7	1	Magic Moments	10 January 1994
8	2	Under the Stars	17 January 1994
9	3	Mad Macaw	24 January 1994
10	4	Beat Thy Neighbour	31 January 1994
11	5	Golden Oldies	7 February 1994
12	6	Snookered	21 February 1994
13	7	There's No Such Thing as Ghosts, Harry	28 February 1994
14	8	Endangered Species	7 March 1994
15	9	Treasure Island	14 March 1994

=== Series 3 (1995) ===
No. overall	No. in series	Title	Original broadcast date
16	1	A Fresh Start	9 January 1995
17	2	Guest Disappearances	16 January 1995
18	3	Heartbreak Hotel	23 January 1995
19	4	The Health Inspector	27 January 1995
20	5	Meaty Chunks	30 January 1995
21	6	The Great Rudini	6 February 1995
22	7	Sick as a Parrot	13 February 1995
23	8	Antics and Antiques	20 February 1995
24	9	A Tail of First Aid	6 March 1995
25	10	The Bird of Paradise	13 March 1995

=== Series 4 (1996) ===
No. overall	No. in series	Title	Original broadcast date
26	1	Harry in Lurve	8 January 1996
27	2	A Piece of Cake	15 January 1996
28	3	Illegal Eagles	22 January 1996
29	4	That's Entertainment	29 January 1996
30	5	Tea and Cakes at the Madison Hotel	5 February 1996
31	6	Stark Raving Mad	12 February 1996
32	7	Mad's Hat Trick	19 February 1996
33	8	Spooks	26 February 1996
34	9	Gambling Is a Risky Business	4 March 1996
35	10	The Vegetable Show	11 March 1996
36	11	Halloween Special	31 October 1996
