= Adam Morris =

British stage and screen actor (born 1964)

- Born: 4 November 1964 (age 61); Stratford-upon-Avon, England, United Kingdom
- Education: Royal Central School of Speech and Drama
- Occupation: Actor
- Years active: 1984 - present

Adam Morris (also known as Wayne Morris) is a British stage and screen actor whose most notable roles have been Robin Hood (or Robin of Kensington) in the television comedy series Maid Marian and Her Merry Men, and more recently, Philip Norton in Genie in the House. Trained at London's Central School of Speech and Drama, his stage appearances include Bri in A Day in the Death of Joe Egg and Gordon in The Throne for the New Vic, and he appeared for one week in Speed the Plow at the Playhouse Theatre, London, opposite Lindsay Lohan while Richard Schiff was indisposed.

He has regularly appeared on television, for example, as Fran's boyfriend in an episode of Black Books, and in I Dream (19 Management/BBC) in 2004 as Patrick.

In 2011, he was voted the "top buzzer" award for his services to children's TV.

In 2015, he was nominated for Best Lead Actor in a Short Film at the 7th International Filmmaker Festival of World Cinema for his performance in Four Tails, a movie shot on Hampstead Heath in the summer of 2013.
