= List of Chuggington episodes =

Chuggington is an animated television series for children.

The following tables list the episodes for the series, which were first broadcast in the UK on BBC Two or CBeebies, starting in 2009. The main episodes are each about 10 minutes long, the Badge Quest episodes are each about 4 minutes long, and various specials, from "Chug Patrol: Ready to Rescue" to "Celebrate Chuggington" are each just over 23 minutes long.

== Series overview ==
Series	Episodes	U.K. airdate		U.S. airdate	
Series	Episodes	First aired	Last aired	First aired	Last aired
1	52	29 September 2008	11 May 2009	18 January 2010	7 January 2011
2	26	13 September 2010	15 December 2010	14 February 2011	16 January 2012
3	14	28 November 2011	15 December 2011	26 March 2012	3 August 2013
4	26	27 August 2013	21 April 2014	20 October 2013	5 December 2014
5	10	18 May 2015	29 May 2015	6 March 2015	28 November 2015
6	46	2 January 2021	12 March 2021	29 June 2020	1 November 2021
Specials	7	26 August 2013	19 December 2021	20 October 2013	7 March 2021
Badge Quest	46	24 July 2010	14 February 2012	26 September 2011	2 July 2013

== Episodes ==
=== Series 1 (2008–2009) ===
No. overall	No. in series	Title	Directed by	Written by	Original broadcaster	Original release date
1	1	"Can't Catch Koko"	Sarah Ball	Sarah Ball and Di Redmond	BBC Two	29 September 2008
When Harrison breaks down, Koko volunteers to take his place on the night shift with Wilson and Brewster. During the night shift, however, she brags about being the fastest, scares Wilson and Brewster, and even teases Brewster! But she soon learns her lesson when she breaks down too during a power cut. Due to this problem, Brewster devises a plan saying that Wilson should tow Koko back to Chuggington while he does the rest of the night shift all on his own. The power then comes back on again. (Series Premiere.) Tunnel Colour: Yellow
2	2	"Wilson and the Elephant"	Sarah Ball	Julie Jones	BBC Two	30 September 2008
The trainees each carry an animal to the new safari park. Koko carries a monkey, Brewster carries a giraffe, and Wilson carries an elephant named Ebo. But Wilson has a hard time with Ebo on the way to the new safari park because as he brings him, Ebo throws some fruits at him, and when Wilson is almost at the new safari park, Ebo escapes! Wilson does not know that Ebo had escaped until Koko asks where he was. Wilson then goes and gets Ebo and returns to the new safari park with Ebo the elephant. Note: This is the first episode that involves animals. Note #2: This is Vicky the Zookeeper and Ebo the elephant's debut. Tunnel Colour: Green
3	3	"Braking Brewster"	Sarah Ball	Sarah Ball and Kate Fawkes	BBC Two	1 October 2008
Wilson and Brewster are sent to get stone from the quarry, but Brewster is in a hurry to practice his new moves. When Brewster speeds out of control because of his heavy load of stone, Wilson creatively saves Brewster from an accident in the mountains while returning home by dropping his load. Tunnel Colour: Blue Note: This is the first episode where the tunnel colour involves two trainees instead of three.
4	4	"Koko and the Tunnel"	Sarah Ball	Sarah Ball	BBC Two	2 October 2008
Koko explores a tunnel with Wilson but fails to tell anyone but Brewster where they're going and trouble awaits. Note: This is the first episode that doesn't involve a tunnel colour.
5	5	"Late Again Eddie"	Sarah Ball	Di Redmond	BBC Two	3 October 2008
Eddie is constantly late for work due to him living with his parents far away from Chuggington. Wilson, Koko, Brewster, Hodge, and Zephie help him make his work route easier by finding him a new house. Note: This episode marks Eddie, Frostini, Emery, Hodge & Felix’s debuts.
6	6	"Bang Klang Wilson"	Sarah Ball	Ian Carney	BBC Two	6 October 2008
Old Puffer Pete lets Wilson use his steam-powered ice cream car when Wilson's breaks down. At the end of this episode, Frostini asks Wilson to teach him how to use the steam-powered ice cream car. Note: This is Old Puffer Pete’s debut.
7	7	"Koko and the Squirrels"	Sarah Ball	Ian Carney	BBC Two	7 October 2008
Koko has to deliver wood to the paper mill, but she ignores Old Puffer Pete's advice to take things slowly and has an accident upon seeing some squirrels on the tracks! As a result, it's Old Puffer Pete to the rescue. Tunnel Colour: Green Note: Wilson and Brewster do not speak in this episode, although they are seen in their roundhouses in the beginning of this episode. Note #2: This is the first episode where the tunnel colour involves one trainee instead of three.
8	8	"Hodge and the Magnet"	Sarah Ball	Sarah Ball	BBC Two	8 October 2008
A track is broken on the other side of the Yellow Tunnel and Hodge has to fix it without Eddie. Wilson tags along to help him.
9	9	"Clunky Wilson"	Sarah Ball	Sarah Ball and Kate Fawkes	BBC Two	9 October 2008
Wilson accidentally breaks a suspension spring while racing Koko and Brewster but is scared to get fixed. Felix asks Wilson to bring him to the county fair, which ends up being a bumpy ride for him. When Wilson goes to the repair shed, Morgan shows him a cool machine and Wilson then tells Brewster and Koko all about it making them want to go. At the end of this episode, Felix won in the butter competition and he then gave Wilson a blue ribbon because he'd helped make the butter. This episode ends with Wilson bringing Felix back home. Tunnel Colour: Green
10	10	"The Chugger Championship"	Sarah Ball	Claudia Silver and Sarah Ball	BBC Two	10 October 2008
It is the annual Chugger Championship in Chuggington. During practice, Koko and Wilson argue over what racing is really about when Koko claims that winning is the most important thing, although it is technically a rule to not give up. However, Hodge tries to get Wilson and Koko to stop arguing and also states that the race isn't about coming in first place or getting trophies and that it's about having fun. Sure enough, it is the case when Koko tries to come in first during the actual big race the next day, but she sacrifices her lead to help Wilson after he breaks down out of nowhere by bringing him back to safety, initially missing out on the trophy. A while later, though, it becomes clear at the end of this episode that Old Puffer Pete has not run the whole track despite crossing the finish line first, and Koko manages to get the trophy to become the winner after all and she and Wilson own up to all their prior madness to start getting along again.
11	11	"Cool Wilson"	Sarah Ball	Ian Carney	BBC Two	13 October 2008
Wilson competes with Brewster to become Frostini's assistant but has to help Old Puffer Pete in the process. Wilson has trouble delivering ice cream to children at first due to various problems, though he gets better at the job. At the end of this episode, Frostini decides that both Wilson and Brewster are his true assistants.
12	12	"Old Puffer Pete's Tour"	Sarah Ball	Simon Jowett	BBC Two	14 October 2008
The trainees do a run with Pete and he gives them a tour of the old town, but the trainees get bored along the way. Tunnel Colour: Yellow
13	13	"Brewster Goes Bananas"	Sarah Ball	Simon Jowett	BBC Two	15 October 2008
A monkey steals Brewster's postbags and causes other problems around the depot like stealing Eddie's wrench and lunchbox. This episode ends with Brewster returning the monkey to the safari park and the monkey throwing a banana peel at the fourth wall. Tunnel Colour: Green
14	14	"Zephie's Zoomaround"	Sarah Ball	Rachel Murrell	BBC Two	16 October 2008
After Zephie gets lost, Olwin and Morgan give her a siren so she can be found if she gets into trouble. However, Zephie carelessly uses it, so Eddie takes it off. A while later, when Zephie has met with farmer Felix's new lamb, she falls over and realizes her mistake with the siren. After returning to Chuggington, Morgan gives Zephie her siren back and Zephie, having learned her lesson, promises to use it only for emergencies in the future.
15	15	"Wilson's Smooth Moves"	Sarah Ball	Lorelei King	BBC Two	17 October 2008
Emery teaches Wilson how to transport passengers smoothly after he teases Wilson and finds out that teasing is never a good idea.
16	16	"Action Brewster"	Sarah Ball	Ian Carney	BBC Two	7 November 2008
Brewster delivers a load of recycling for Irving, but has to do a long run and could miss Action Chugger's new movie, and he tries to do anything to avoid being late for it at the Ride-In. Tunnel Colour: Green
17	17	"Koko's Puppy Training"	Sarah Ball	Cate Lieuwen	BBC Two	10 November 2008
Koko finds a lost dog and wants to keep it, but finds out that the dog belongs to a girl named Jenny.
18	18	"Koko on Call"	Sarah Ball	Sarah Ball and Brenda Scott Royce	BBC Two	12 November 2008
Koko assists Dr. Gosling by keeping an eye on a giraffe at the safari park overnight. Wilson forgets to tell Koko to not use her light on all night long, which causes a problem. The trainees watch the giraffe and her baby girl. This episode ends with an owl flying, covering the entire background.
19	19	"Outward Bound Olwin"	Sarah Ball	Mark Caven	BBC Two	13 November 2008
Olwin has to rescue Wilson, Koko, and Brewster when they get stranded in the old town.
20	20	"Brewster and the Dragon"	Sarah Ball	Mark Caven	BBC Two	14 November 2008
After finding out from Emery that some animals escaped from the safari park, Brewster is convinced that dragons are real. Tunnel Colour: Green
21	21	"Wake Up Wilson"	Sarah Ball	Ian Carney	BBC Two	17 November 2008
Wilson is tired from staying up late, and has trouble completing his mail run on time. Note: There is a noticeable mistake where in the British English dub, which can be watched on BBC iPlayer, when someone says “Z’s” during the song "Honk Yourself Awake", it is pronounced the American way (like "zees").
22	22	"Brewster Knows Best"	Sarah Ball	Ross Hastings	BBC Two	18 November 2008
Brewster, Koko, and Wilson are tested on their ability to accurately follow directions, but Koko and Wilson are too impatient and greedy to accept the fact Brewster is doing the right thing regarding his own patience.
23	23	"Koko Pulls It Off"	Sarah Ball	Jimmy Hibbert	BBC Two	19 November 2008
Koko is unhappy to be told that she has failed a test due to Mr. Simpkins' unfair way of treating her as well as unclear instructions, and she cries about this in disappointment. When Irving finds out about Koko being devastated, he is on the case as he is ready to help her get a second chance to make up for the first attempt.
24	24	"Wilson and the Ice Cream"	Sarah Ball	Jimmy Hibbert	BBC Two	20 November 2008
Wilson is asked to take refrigerated carriages to the ice cream fair, but he gets sidetracked talking to Frostini and forgets about what he has been asked to do on time. Wilson then decides to take all of the refrigerated carriages to the fair all at once which makes it too heavy for him and asks Frostini for help. When all of the carriages are at the fair, Wilson then catches Frostini's saying.
25	25	"Wilson's Wacky Tour"	Sarah Ball	Brenda Scott Royce	BBC Two	21 November 2008
Wilson has difficulty with patience when learning from Mtambo and gets his animal facts mixed up when giving a tour.
26	26	"Wilson Gets a Wash"	Sarah Ball	Ian Carney	BBC Two	3 December 2008
Calley and Dunbar teach the trainees to brake in mud, but after getting dirty Wilson is scared to go through the chugwash and so he escapes. He tries to get out of being washed by claiming that the chugwash is broken when he speaks to Eddie about it, although it is not at all. But Brewster and Koko eventually catch Wilson and bring him directly to the chugwash. As a result, Wilson will need to face his fears, but when he finally does, all the trainees want to get washed up again!
27	27	"Hodge's Secret"	Sarah Ball	Charles Hodges	CBeebies	6 April 2009
Hodge wants to do a larger variety of things without Eddie, but his attempts create all sorts of problems in the training yard as a result of trying to be more independent than ever before, and he needs to find the courage to own up to such mistakes.
28	28	"Frostini's Fruit Fandango"	Sarah Ball	Jimmy Hibbert and Sarah Ball	CBeebies	7 April 2009
Frostini is helped by Wilson and the safari park monkeys when creating a new flavour of ice cream. Tunnel Colour: Yellow
29	29	"Zephie Ace Reporter"	Sarah Ball	Jimmy Hibbert	CBeebies	8 April 2009
Zephie takes newspaper reporter Rag and photographer Snap to the depot to do a story about Morgan's new rail cycle.
30	30	"Famous Emery"	Sarah Ball	Merlin Ward and Lorelei King	CBeebies	9 April 2009
Emery transports a television crew around, and sees a chance for stardom.
31	31	"Watch Out Wilson!"	Sarah Ball	Lorelei King and Sarah Ball	CBeebies	10 April 2009
The trainees try their wheels at pulling and rolling stock around an obstacle course. It seems easy, until they're told they have to do it backwards as well.
32	32	"Brewster's Hobby"	Sarah Ball	Ross Hastings	CBeebies	13 April 2009
Brewster tells Wilson about his new hobby: people spotting. Tunnel Colour: Yellow
33	33	"Zephie's Monkey Business"	Sarah Ball	Rachel Murrell and Sarah Ball	CBeebies	14 April 2009
After Emery makes an offhand comment, Zephie becomes afraid of the monkeys at the safari park. Fortunately, Dr. Gosling is on the case. Meanwhile, Wilson and Koko are having a hard time getting along during a relay race. Tunnel Colour: Green
34	34	"Poor Old Puffer Pete"	Sarah Ball	Brenda Scott Royce and Sarah Ball	CBeebies	15 April 2009
When Zephie overhears Morgan and Lori saying that Pete's old tender carriage Terry has to be scrapped, she thinks they're talking about Pete, so the truth needs to be clarified.
35	35	"Inspector Emery"	Sarah Ball	Brenda Scott Royce and Sarah Ball	CBeebies	16 April 2009
Emery unknowingly takes an inspector on a tour of the Chuggington depot.
36	36	"Nurse Wilson"	Sarah Ball	Di Redmond	CBeebies	17 April 2009
Dunbar and a nurse from the local hospital are teaching the trainees about the ambulance car. Dunbar loses his voice, and as a result Wilson tries to be a nurse and help him regain his voice.
37	37	"Mtambo's Amazing Adventure"	Sarah Ball	Brenda Scott Royce and Lorelei King	CBeebies	20 April 2009
Mtambo discovers that he doesn't have to go far in order to find new and exciting stories to tell.
38	38	"Rock-a-Bye Chatsworth"	Sarah Ball	Jimmy Hibbert	CBeebies	21 April 2009
Chatsworth is extremely tired after doing several runs, but is repeatedly disturbed when he tries to get some rest. Note: This episode's title is a pun on the famous English nursery rhyme "Rock-a-Bye Baby".
39	39	"Helpful Hodge"	Sarah Ball	James Mason	CBeebies	22 April 2009
Hodge and Koko have a competition to see who can do the most jobs in a day.
40	40	"Brewster to the Rescue"	Sarah Ball	Sarah Ball	CBeebies	23 April 2009
Calley teaches young trainees how to be a rescue chugger. During the lesson, Brewster completely loses confidence by doing everything wrong, so he eventually gives up and decides to try and save his badge another time. However, Brewster changes his mind when he ends up managing to successfully save Chatsworth after one of his cars sets on fire and gets a special badge for being brave after all.
41	41	"Wilson & the Paint Wagon"	Sarah Ball	James Mason	CBeebies	24 April 2009
When Wilson has trouble using a paint wagon correctly, it turns out that he has not been ready for it yet, thus Old Puffer Pete gives him advice on how it works.
42	42	"Eddie Finds Time"	Sarah Ball	Based on an idea by : Di Redmond; Teleplay by : Sarah Ball and Lorelei King	CBeebies	27 April 2009
The depot clock is broken and Eddie tries to fix it.
43	43	"Mtambo's Royal Tour"	Sarah Ball	Based on an idea by : Rachel Murrell; Teleplay by : Sarah Ball and Lorelei King	CBeebies	28 April 2009
Mtambo gives the King of Buffertonia a tour of the safari park.
44	44	"Wilson & the Wild Wind"	Sarah Ball	James Mason and Sarah Ball	CBeebies	29 April 2009
When Wilson plays around with the storm maker simulator, he accidentally unleashes a violent storm.
45	45	"Old Puffer Pete's Firebox"	Sarah Ball	Jimmy Hibbert	CBeebies	30 April 2009
Puffer Pete's firebox is heavily damaged and needs to be replaced. Without the firebox, Pete can't move freely, so the trainees try to help him by finding a new firebox.
46	46	"Jet Pack Wilson"	Sarah Ball	Sarah Ball	CBeebies	1 May 2009
Wilson wants to fly through the air like Action Chugger, but nearly causes a serious accident by using a jetpack without permission.
47	47	"Brewster's Little Helper"	Sarah Ball	Lorelei King	CBeebies	4 May 2009
Zephie wants to be like the big Chuggers, so when she overhears Brewster being given his jobs for the day she decides to help out by doing some of them for him.
48	48	"Bubbly Olwin"	Sarah Ball	Sarah Ball and Jimmy Hibbert	CBeebies	5 May 2009
A photographer comes to Chuggington to do a feature on steam trains. Olwin is determined to look her best for the pictures, but she doesn't notice when a bottle of soap accidentally lands in her water tank and makes her blow bubbles because of Wilson and Brewster causing an accident during an argument on how they should take a wagon loaded with elephant soap wash to the safari park.
49	49	"Koko Takes Charge"	Sarah Ball	Charles Hodges, Sarah Ball and Lorelei King	CBeebies	6 May 2009
Irving leaves Koko in charge of the recycling yard while he is away, but she doesn't listen properly to his instructions because of Koko herself losing it with same old instructions, plus Koko bosses Wilson around and trouble awaits.
50	50	"Wilson's Paper Trail"	Sarah Ball	Sarah Ball	CBeebies	7 May 2009
Wilson has to deliver some special paper to the printer, but gets it wet when he's distracted by a broken water pipe.
51	51	"Puffer Pete's Big Show"	Sarah Ball	Sarah Ball	CBeebies	8 May 2009
It's Pete's anniversary and the trainees put on a show for him to celebrate his special day. Tunnel Colour: Yellow
52	52	"Training Time Harrison"	Sarah Ball	Jimmy Hibbert	CBeebies	11 May 2009
The Prince of Buffertonia is visiting. Harrison wants to pull the royal carriage, but doesn't follow the rules in the race to get the job, and as a result has to spend time refreshing his skills with the trainees.

=== Series 2 (2010) ===
No. overall	No. in series	UK title (top) US title (bottom)	Directed by	Written by	Original broadcaster	Original release date
53	1	"Koko's New Look"	Sarah Ball	Lucy Daniel Raby	CBeebies	13 September 2010
After Lori paints a design on Zephie's face, Koko wants a similar look, making Zephie unhappy.
54	2	"Frostini's Meltdown"	Sarah Ball	Phil O'Shea	CBeebies	14 September 2010
The hottest day of the year is coming up, so Frostini gets his ice cream ready. Suddenly, a power cut occurs and there will be no electricity till tomorrow, but by that time all of the ice cream will melt. Frostini travels to the ice caves with Speedy to get some ice and tells Wilson, Brewster and Koko to keep the ice cream cold in the fridge cars till the morning.
55	3	"Babysitter Brewster"	Sarah Ball	Emma Reeves	CBeebies	15 September 2010
Brewster must rescue Hoot and Toot after they get stuck underground.
56	4	"Lights Camera Action Chugger"	Sarah Ball	Sarah Ball and Jacquelyn Bell	CBeebies	16 September 2010
Emery does various jobs to help with Action Chugger's new movie. Meanwhile, Action Chugger falls out of the sky while flying to the film set, and Brewster has to rescue him.
57	5	"Chug of War"	Sarah Ball	Based on an idea by : Dominic Macdonald; Teleplay by : Sarah Ball and Lorelei King	CBeebies	17 September 2010
57	5	"Wilson and the Steam Team"	Sarah Ball	Based on an idea by : Dominic Macdonald; Teleplay by : Sarah Ball and Lorelei King	CBeebies	17 September 2010
Wilson helps Speedy, Olwin, Old Puffer Pete, Chatsworth, Zephie and Dunbar prepare for an important competition against Harrison, Calley, Mtambo, Koko, Brewster, Hodge, and Irving to see which chuggers will help out at the quarry mines. Note: This episode's hilarious title is a pun on "tug-of-war".
58	6	"Hodge Sails Away"	Sarah Ball	Deirdra Morris and Sarah Ball	CBeebies	20 September 2010
It's a windy day and Hodge wants to help out and fix things, but Eddie is late.
59	7	"Stop the Press Emery"	Sarah Ball	Davey Moore and Lorelei King	CBeebies	21 September 2010
Emery takes Rag around the depot as he reports on interesting news stories. Note: This episode reveals that the Magnificent Mysterioso can turn himself invisible. Note #2: There is a noticeable mistake in this episode's end credits; the text says "Mysterious" instead of "(The) Magnificent Mysterioso".
60	8	"Hoot v. Toot"	Sarah Ball	Sarah Ball and Jacquelyn Bell	CBeebies	22 September 2010
Hoot and Toot have to deliver some goods, but Hoot has some visual problems. Thus they mix up a number of things, including a repair machine which transforms Wilson into Koko as a result. Tunnel Colour: Red
61	9	"The Brewster Booster"	Sarah Ball	Brenda Scott Royce and Sarah Ball	CBeebies	23 September 2010
Dr. Ling has Brewster test her new creation, the Chug Booster, but it malfunctions and becomes dangerous when it overspeeds.
62	10	"Quizmaster Hodge"	Sarah Ball	Sarah Ball	CBeebies	24 September 2010
Hodge hosts the chug quiz after quizmaster Harrison loses his voice.
63	11	"Wilson & the Dinosaur"	Sarah Ball	Ian Carney and Sarah Ball	CBeebies	27 September 2010
Wilson takes pictures of Chuggington residents with the camera car.
64	12	"Snowstruck Wilson"	Sarah Ball	Deirdra Morris	CBeebies	28 September 2010
Wilson tries to enjoy the snowy weather, but gets trapped inside a tunnel with snow blocking the exits and it's Harrison and Action Chugger to the rescue. Tunnel Colour: Blue
65	13	"Heave Ho Harrison"	Sarah Ball	Gerard Harris	CBeebies	29 September 2010
While clearing the rails, Harrison tries to remove a heavy snowdrift but it fails to work as he ends up getting stuck in it. The more chuggers come to his rescue, the bigger chance is able to be pulled out! Note: Despite this episode having a similar rescue idea to Snowstruck Wilson, in the sense that a chugger gets stuck in something to do with snow, Heave Ho Harrison is not a proper sequel to Snowstruck Wilson due to both episodes about snow having different plot structures. This can be particularly noticed with the endings as the one for Snowstruck Wilson feels rather unfinished unlike most episodes, whereas Heave Ho Harrison feels more complete.
66	14	"Scrub-a-Chug"	Sarah Ball	Based on an idea by : =Phil O'Shea; Teleplay by : Sarah Ball and Lorelei King	CBeebies	29 November 2010
Wilson tries to be helpful by cleaning the tunnels for Eddie and Hodge, but ends up making a huge mess.
67	15	"Next Stop – Space"	Sarah Ball	Mark Robertson	CBeebies	30 November 2010
Dr. Ling gives a presentation about meteors and how, many years ago, one crashed close to Chuggington.
68	16	"Chilly Chuggers"	Sarah Ball	Sarah Ball and Jacquelyn Bell	CBeebies	1 December 2010
An ice storm hits Chuggington and Emery gets stranded after Koko accidentally has sprayed tracks with water.
69	17	"Stunt Brewster"	Sarah Ball	Anna Lea and Sarah Ball	CBeebies	2 December 2010
Brewster uses his newly acquired stunt skills to rescue Koko from a runaway wagon.
70	18	"Wilson's Icy Escapade"	Sarah Ball	Anna-Lisa Jenaer	CBeebies	3 December 2010
On an icy winter's day, Wilson gets stuck in the ice cave, and he needs to figure out how to escape.
71	19	"Rolling Reporter Wilson"	Sarah Ball	Peter Hynes	CBeebies	6 December 2010
Border Bridge is reopening and it's decided that Wilson will make a live report, but he needs to rescue Hoot and Toot from the ice cave first.
72	20	"Zephie & the Bees"	Sarah Ball	Based on an idea by : Annie Caulfield; Teleplay by : Sarah Ball and Jacquelyn Bell	CBeebies	7 December 2010
Zephie has a problem with a swarm of bees.
73	21	"Brewster Meets the Mayor"	Sarah Ball	Sarah Ball and Lorelei King	CBeebies	8 December 2010
Brewster is going to carry the Mayor across Border Bridge, but the bridge first needs to be repaired.
74	22	"Chugger of the Year"	Sarah Ball	Mark Caven	CBeebies	9 December 2010
The Mayor is observing the chuggers to decide who should get the Chugger of the Year award. Koko tries to win the award but her ideas backfire as they lead to her losing because of them causing problems at the ceremony when she attempts to impress the mayor rather than by doing her jobs. Speedy helps to resolve the problems, and Koko realizes that Speedy should earn the award due to differences between their levels of being careful.
75	23	"Fault Finder Emery"	Sarah Ball	Sarah Ball	CBeebies	10 December 2010
Emery becomes overcareful of the chuggers after Wilson has a derailment due to an uneven load.
76	24	"Hodge & the Chugnav"	Sarah Ball	Based on an idea by : Deirdra Morris; Teleplay by : Sarah Ball and Jacquelyn Bell	CBeebies	13 December 2010
Hodge offers to help Eddie by using Dr. Ling's Chugnav to pick up a part that is needed to repair the broken lift.
77	25	"A Pat on the Paintwork"	Sarah Ball	Sarah Ball and Jacquelyn Bell	CBeebies	14 December 2010
Koko decides to try for the High Speed badge, which no trainee has ever before achieved.
78	26	"Toot's Tall Tale"	Sarah Ball	Sarah Ball	CBeebies	15 December 2010
Toot doesn't want to do a track inspection with Hoot, so to get out of it she pretends she doesn't feel well.

=== Series 3 (2011) ===
No. overall	No. in series	Title	Directed by	Written by	Original broadcaster	Original release date
79	1	"Gold Wheels"	Sarah Ball	Sarah Ball	CBeebies	28 November 2011
Vee rewards Hoot and Toot with a gold wheel after they help Wilson, though they end up doing more harm than good in pursuit of another one.
80	2	"Special Helper Wilson"	Sarah Ball	Emma Reeves	CBeebies	29 November 2011
Wilson has difficulty collecting pumpkins for Frostini so Hoot and Toot decide to lend a wheel.
81	3	"Hodge Can't Wait"	Sarah Ball	Patrick Gallagher and Craig Ferguson	CBeebies	30 November 2011
Hodge breaks down on his way to the rolling stock show and uses smoke signals to attract attention.
82	4	"Chug-o-Flage"	Sarah Ball	Sarah Ball and Emma Reeves	CBeebies	1 December 2011
Wilson camouflages himself to be a parrot, but this disguise plan backfires as he ends up scaring the safari park animals by mistake.
83	5	"Koko's Game"	Sarah Ball	Sarah Ball and Emma Reeves	CBeebies	2 December 2011
Koko gets addicted to a video game while trying to beat Hodge's score, causing her to lose control on the rails. In the end, Eddie confiscates the game as a result of such madness.
84	6	"Magnetic Wilson"	Sarah Ball	Mark Robertson	CBeebies	5 December 2011
A magnetic crane magnetizes Wilson, who then attracts a number of metal objects, along with much unwanted attention.
85	7	"Zephie's Star Club"	Sarah Ball	Alex Williams	CBeebies	6 December 2011
Zephie creates her own club, but is selective when it comes to who's allowed to join.
86	8	"Undercover Action Chugger"	Sarah Ball	Alex Williams and Sarah Ball	CBeebies	7 December 2011
Action Chugger tries to prepare for a role in his new movie by trying to be an ordinary chugger, but it doesn't work so he has Morgan switch off his superpowers.
87	9	"Movie Maker Brewster"	Sarah Ball	Patrick Gallagher and Craig Ferguson	CBeebies	8 December 2011
Mayor Pullman asks Brewster to make a movie about Chuggington.
88	10	"Top Secret Koko"	Sarah Ball	Kate Scott	CBeebies	9 December 2011
Koko is told an important secret and struggles to keep it to herself.
89	11	"Toot's New Friend"	Sarah Ball	Sarah Ball	CBeebies	12 December 2011
A new trainee called Piper arrives in Chuggington and gets a lot of attention making Toot Jealous, and is upset when he has to give her Hoot and her cabin, Until Hoot tells her off.
90	12	"Skylar's Squad"	Sarah Ball	Heather Simms	CBeebies	13 December 2011
The trainees compete to become members of Skylar's Squad, a new rescue team created by Skylar. While Wilson, Brewster and Koko train with Skylar. Hoot and Toot rescue Olwin from a mine.
91	13	"Wobbly Wheels"	Sarah Ball	Sarah Ball	CBeebies	14 December 2011
When Piper disobeys orders and goes out of the depot Wilson must use his newly acquired emergency skills to save Piper from derailing on a steep hill.
92	14	"Brewster's Crane Training"	Sarah Ball	Alex Williams and Sarah Ball	CBeebies	15 December 2011
Skylar replaces Dunbar as teacher of the trainees, and teaches the trainees about using a grab-crane, but Brewster misses Dunbar.

=== Series 4 (2013–2014) ===
No. overall	No. in series	Title	Directed by	Written by	Original broadcaster	Original release date
93	1	"Rescue at Rocky Ridge"	Sarah Ball	Sarah Ball	CBeebies	26 August 2013 *
Wilson rescues Koko when she's trapped in a mine tunnel, which is in great danger of collapsing. * Note: this is the 1st of the two episodes included in the "Chug Patrol: Ready to Rescue" Special (which was first broadcast in the UK on 26 August 2013). The "stand-alone" version of the episode was first broadcast in the UK on 2 September 2013.
94	2	"Wilson's Forest Flare"	Sarah Ball	Sarah Ball	CBeebies	26 August 2013 *
When Emery breaks down in the forest, it's Chug Patroller Wilson to the rescue. * Note: this is the 2nd of the two episodes included in the "Chug Patrol: Ready to Rescue" Special, making this episode the sequel to Rescue at Rocky Ridge (the special was first broadcast in the UK on 26 August 2013). The "stand-alone" version of the episode was first broadcast in the UK on 3 September 2013.
95	3	"Stop Koko Stop!"	Sarah Ball	Alex Williams	CBeebies	27 August 2013
Hanzo teaches Koko to control her new engine booster, and Brewster decides he has a talent for track-laying.
96	4	"Runaway Koko"	Sarah Ball	Kate Scott	CBeebies	28 August 2013
Koko's speed booster malfunctions and she goes out of control.
97	5	"Brewster Makes Tracks"	Sarah Ball	Kate Scott	CBeebies	29 August 2013
The Chuggineers demolish an old cooling tower and Brewster cannot wait to see it come down, but an urgent job means he may miss the explosion.
98	6	"Chief Wilson"	Sarah Ball	Kate Scott	CBeebies	30 August 2013
Wilson's new Chug Patrol skills are put to the test, but things go awry when he forgets something important.
99	7	"Back Up Brewster"	Sarah Ball	Rick Vanes	CBeebies	30 September 2013
Zack becomes trapped when an old rickety bridge collapses, prompting Brewster to use all his craning skills to lift him safely out of the high tunnel.
100	8	"Track Laying Brewster"	Sarah Ball	Sarah Ball	CBeebies	1 October 2013
Zack, Tyne, and Fletch get stranded by some washed out tracks due to a heavy flash flood.
101	9	"Explorer Koko"	Sarah Ball	Kate Scott	CBeebies	2 October 2013
Koko takes some very important visitors including the mayor on a tour.
102	10	"The Old Silver Mine Line"	Sarah Ball	Mark Daydy	CBeebies	3 October 2013
Brewster and Koko get stranded on the opposite side of a broken track that the Chuggineers are repairing.
103	11	"Brewster Leads the Way"	Sarah Ball	Kate Scott	CBeebies	4 October 2013
Brewster is given the task of transporting a massive tunnel boring machine with the help of the chuggers, but one by one they all begin to get called away or drop out.
104	12	"Park Patroller Wilson"	Sarah Ball	Based on an idea by : Gerard Harris; Teleplay by : Sarah Ball	CBeebies	5 October 2013
Old Puffer Pete goes sleep riding around Chuggington, so Wilson tries to find a solution to keep him safe.
105	13	"High Rise Rescue"	Sarah Ball	Alex Williams	CBeebies	6 October 2013
Hodge gets a new job cleaning windows on the high-rise buildings in the city, taking over from Old Puffer Pete, who shows him what to do. Meanwhile, Jackman takes Wilson out for some fire safety training at the old power station.
106	14	"Winter Whiteout"	Sarah Ball	Sarah Ball	CBeebies	2 January 2014
Wilson has to rescue Koko and the mayor when they get stuck in the snow.
107	15	"Snow Patrol"	Sarah Ball	Mark Daydy	CBeebies	3 January 2014
Fletch is trapped in a snowdrift in the mountains and Wilson must find a way to rescue him.
108	16	"Fearless Wilson"	Sarah Ball	Kate Scott	CBeebies	7 April 2014
When Brewster slips into the river, Wilson must overcome his struggles with the speed booster wagon to help his friend.
109	17	"Special Rescue Team"	Sarah Ball	Sarah Ball	CBeebies	8 April 2014
The Chug Patrollers use a banner as a sling to rescue Eddie from the side of a bridge.
110	18	"Deputy Chug Patrollers"	Sarah Ball	Marie Breadmore, Sarah Ball and Lorelei King	CBeebies	9 April 2014
Koko and Brewster become Wilson's deputy chug patrollers when Chatsworth is stuck in a tunnel.
111	19	"Blazin' Wilson"	Sarah Ball	Ricky Vines	CBeebies	10 April 2014
When he runs out of water, Wilson must think on his wheels during a special fire-training exercise.
112	20	"On Track Brewster"	Sarah Ball	Kate Scott	CBeebies	11 April 2014
Brewster has his first 'chuggineer' test, and Wilson is on safety patrol. Tyne and Fletch demolish an old bridge.
113	21	"We Are the Chuggineers"	Sarah Ball	Sarah Ball	CBeebies	14 April 2014
A problem occurs when the chuggineers build a bridge for a new high-speed link to Tootington – but eagle-eyed Brewster saves the day. Note: this is the 1st of the two episodes included in the Special episode "The Chuggineers: Ready to Build" (which was first broadcast in Canada on 5 May 2014).
114	22	"Team Trainee"	Sarah Ball	Sarah Ball	CBeebies	15 April 2014
Koko and Hanzo become stranded during the Track Dash fun race.
115	23	"Record Breaker Koko"	Sarah Ball	Alex Williams	CBeebies	16 April 2014
Koko attempts to break a speed record at the Chug-a-sonic Speedtrack.
116	24	"The Tootington Tunnel"	Sarah Ball	Sarah Ball	CBeebies	17 April 2014
Brewster and Cormac become embroiled in a chase in the countryside.. Note: this is the 2nd of the two episodes included in the Special episode "The Chuggineers: Ready To Build" (which was first broadcast in Canada on 5 May 2014).
117	25	"Iron Chuggers"	Sarah Ball	Sarah Ball and Lorelei King	CBeebies	18 April 2014
The Chuggineers compete with the Steam Train for the coveted Iron Chuggers title.
118	26	"Round Up Wilson"	Sarah Ball	Sarah Ball and Kate Scott	CBeebies	21 April 2014
During a training exercise, Wilson and the rest of Chug Patrol must evacuate animals from the safari park.

=== Series 5 (2015) ===
No. overall	No. in series	Title	Directed by	Written by	Original broadcaster	Original release date
119	1	"First Responder Calley"	Sarah Ball	Sarah Ball	CBeebies	18 May 2015
Calley worries she doesn't have a specialty, but proves she is a great all-rounder.
120	2	"Sinkhole Rescue"	Sarah Ball	Lorelei King	CBeebies	19 May 2015
When Wilson and Brewster practice working on their skills a sinkhole opens up. Wilson has to use his new knowledge to save Brewster from falling into it.
121	3	"Cormac Patrol"	Sarah Ball	Sarah Ball	CBeebies	20 May 2015
Cormac loves to be busy, but with a problem at the docks, he gets increasingly bored, but when Jackman, Asher and Calley are trapped behind a rockfall at the quarry, it's Cormac to the rescue. Cormac tried to lift the large pieces of rock, but they're too heavy, then he saw a big excavator, he used the excavator to smash the pieces of rock to save the Chug Patrollers and save the day.
122	4	"Trainee Camp"	Sarah Ball	Sarah Ball and Lorelei King	CBeebies	21 May 2015
Wilson, Brewster, Koko, Hoot and Toot are going to Trainee Camp to learn new skills and work as a team.
123	5	"Tour Guide Harrison"	Sarah Ball	Sarah Ball and Lorelei King	CBeebies	22 May 2015
Harrison must devise a special tour of Chuggington in order to pass his tour guide test.
124	6	"Delivery Challenge"	Sarah Ball	Sarah Ball	CBeebies	25 May 2015
Cormac challenges Old Puffer Pete to a delivery contest. Meanwhile, The Chuggineers are relining a tunnel.
125	7	"Koko Express"	Sarah Ball	Sarah Ball and Lorelei King	CBebbies	26 May 2015
Koko learns that being careful and quick is the trick to being an express courier train when she nearly has an accident at the docks.
126	8	"Skipper Stu and the Steam Crane"	Sarah Ball	Sarah Ball	CBeebies	27 May 2015
When the dock's crane breaks down, Skipper Stu must find another way to load the ship.
127	9	"Chug Patrol Chief"	Sarah Ball	Sarah Ball	CBeebies	28 May 2015
Jackman, Asher, Puffer Pete, Olwin and Koko have to struggle down an icy slope to get to the inaccessible frozen over docks to get fuel for all the chuggers when an ice storm hits Chuggington and fuel supplies run low.
128	10	"Fletch Shines"	Sarah Ball	Sarah Ball	CBeebies	29 May 2015
Fletch repairs the lighthouse by himself and discovers that being in charge is hard.

=== Series 6: Tales from the Rails (2021) ===
A new series of episodes was released on 29 June 2020 in the US, and in the UK on 2 January 2021. The series consists of 46 regular 10-minute episodes and two 24-minute specials: "Celebrate Chuggington" and "Chugging Home for the Holidays".

No. overall	No. in series	Title	Original broadcaster	Written by	Original release date
129	1	"Slow Coach Koko"	CBeebies	Craig Fernandez	2 January 2021
Koko's confidence is shaken after she gets in an accident. Scared and second-guessing herself, can she regain her speed in time to save Wilson and Brewster from trouble?
130	2	"My Hero"	CBeebies	Michael Foulke	3 January 2021
When Action Chugger fails to show up for Hero Day, Brewster decides to be a hero himself.
131	3	"Wilson's Broadcast Blues"	CBeebies	Ryan Toyama	9 January 2021
Wilson is chosen to appear on Radio Chuggington and decides to exaggerate a news story when his friends want to see a movie instead of listening to the radio.
132	4	"Wild Safari Park"	CBeebies	Denise Downer	10 January 2021
Mtambo is charged with feeding the Safari Park animals and needs help from Wilson to complete his task in a timely manner. Note: There is a noticeable error/mistake in this episode's end credits; "Mtambo" is misspelled as "Mambo".
133	5	"Frostini's True Calling"	CBeebies	Eva Konstantopoulos	16 January 2021
Frostini decides to embark on a personal mission to discover what his true passion in life is. He sings a song called "Ice Cream Mi Amoré", about his love for ice-cream.
134	6	"The Old Fashioned Way"	CBeebies	Kevin Monk	17 January 2021
Koko has Old Puffer Pete feeling like his old ways are methodical and too slow. Does Old Puffer Pete have what it takes to save the day when new technology is put to the test?
135	7	"The Extra Mile"	CBeebies	Michael Rabb	18 January 2021
Detective Brewster works to help Wilson find Koko's award ribbon that Wilson secretly borrowed. After secretly borrowing it, Wilson sings with pride about him feeling like he won the ribbon.
136	8	"Glow Koko"	CBeebies	Sarah Ball	19 January 2021
Koko, Piper, and Hodge stumble upon an unexpected number of things that glow in the dark around Chuggington.
137	9	"Not from Around Here"	CBeebies	Michael G. Stern	20 January 2021
When a new chugger, Rosa, comes to Chuggington, the trainees try to find the best job for her.
138	10	"Out in the Cold"	CBeebies	Michael Rabb	21 January 2021
When a snow storm comes to Chuggington, Wilson and Brewster get caught out in the cold and must work together to make their way home.
139	11	"Wilson's Wag-a-Lagon"	CBeebies	Stacey J. Greenberger	22 January 2021
Wilson's long time wagon begins falling apart, and he doesn't want to let it go.
140	12	"Sleepyhead Koko"	CBeebies	Denise Downer	25 January 2021
Koko let her excitement get the best of her and stayed up all night! Can Brewster and Wilson honk Koko awake in time for her to take the Mayor to a special ceremony at the docks?
141	13	"Piperactive"	CBeebies	Craig Fernandez	26 January 2021
Piper must limit playtime when the Trainees are assigned to bring food to the poor Mtambo.
142	14	"The Mighty Koko"	CBeebies	Michael Foulke	27 January 2021
Koko becomes incredibly strong after she gets an upgrade to her hydraulic power booster.
143	15	"The Fast, The Strong & the Wilson"	CBeebies	Ryan Toyama	28 January 2021
Wilson goes for the gold to find out what he's best at as all of Chuggington is celebrating and competing in the Chuggington Games!
144	16	"Chug Patrol, Out of Control"	CBeebies	Ryan Toyama	29 January 2021
Wilson organizes Zephie, Piper, and Hoot & Toot together to form his very own Junior Chug Patrol Crew, but he finds it difficult to be a good chief.
145	17	"The 3 Ways of the Track"	CBeebies	Bill Zide	1 February 2021
With guidance from the ever-wise Hanzo, Tai must learn how to remain focused, calm, and balanced.
146	18	"Spy Train"	CBeebies	Jessica Welsh	2 February 2021
The Trainees are on a mission to play top-secret spy games in Chuggington but their sleuthing missions turn into wild shenanigans.
147	19	"Odd Train Out"	CBeebies	Danielle Koenig	3 February 2021
Zephie, Wilson, and Brewster compete to be Koko's partner in a relay race, but Koko knows that Zephie is the weakest.
148	20	"It's Not Easy Being Clean"	CBeebies	Michael Rabb	4 February 2021
Wilson looks shiny and new after his trip to the Chug Wash and the other trainees are impressed – but everyone knows he's a magnet for a mess!
149	21	"Monkey Sitting"	CBeebies	Sharon Soboil	5 February 2021
Wilson has his bumpers full while babysitting an adorable monkey that goes bananas.
150	22	"Tai Tracks"	CBeebies	Michael Rabb	8 February 2021
New to Chuggington, Tai must navigate her way around town to make an important delivery on time! With help from her new friends, she just might get the job done!
151	23	"Rock 'n' Rollers"	CBeebies	Eva Konstantopoulos	9 February 2021
After discovering their hidden talent for music Wilson, Koko, and Brewster form a band. But, after Koko's horn goes wonky, will the trainees find a replacement in time for them to rock out on the radio?
152	24	"Brewster's Greatest Gift"	CBeebies	Stacey Greenberger	10 February 2021
With Hodge's radiator broken and no way to order another one, Brewster turns out to be the only one that can help by making a brave decision.
153	25	"Chuggington Noir"	CBeebies	Ryan Toyama	11 February 2021
Chuggington is left in the dark when the lighthouse mysteriously stops working.
154	26	"Imagine That"	CBeebies	Jeff Wynne	12 February 2021
The trainees learn that with a little imagination any ordinary job can be extraordinary.
155	27	"Chug Encounters of the Train Kind"	CBeebies	Ryan Toyama	15 February 2021
Look up in the sky! Is it a bird? A plane? No, it's Space Chuggers!
156	28	"The Spooky Chugger"	CBeebies	Thomas Hall	16 February 2021
Rattling rivets! The Spooky Chugger has returned!
157	29	"Chug Patrol: Mission Thunder"	CBeebies	Eva Konstantopoulos	17 February 2021
When a thunderstorm comes to Chuggington, Wilson can't control his fear!
158	30	"The Royal Chugger"	CBeebies	Michael Rabb	18 February 2021
Wilson finds out he's the first of his kind. His friends deem him Chuggington Royalty.
159	31	"Action Chugger's Day Off"	CBeebies	Danielle Koenig	19 February 2021
Action Chugger has a hard time relaxing.
160	32	"Twin Trouble"	CBeebies	Eva Konstantopoulos	22 February 2021
Hoot has had enough of his sister Toot! And Toot is tired of her brother Hoot!
161	33	"Night Moves"	CBeebies	Danielle Koenig	23 February 2021
An exhausted Wilson must roam Chuggington in search of a new cabin to sleep in.
162	34	"The Great Chugger Caper"	CBeebies	Ryan Toyama	24 February 2021
The trainees take on their undercover personas to retrieve a surprise gift for Skipper Stu.
163	35	"Piper's City Safari"	CBeebies	Patrick Rieger	25 February 2021
Koko, Wilson and Brewster give Piper a surprise tour.
164	36	"The Trainee and the Tree"	CBeebies	Stacey Greenberger	26 February 2021
Brewster encounters the oldest tree in Chuggington.
165	37	"Gold Rush"	CBeebies	Michael Rabb	1 March 2021
The trainees find a gold nugget and dream of ways to spend their riches.
166	38	"Pumpkin Spice Chuggers"	CBeebies	Ryan Toyama	2 March 2021
The trainees are on another mission as they try to rescue the last pumpkin in town.
167	39	"Reachin' Rosa"	CBeebies	Patrick Rieger	3 March 2021
During a game of Chuggball, the trainees discover Rosa has a talent for reaching high.
168	40	"Chugatronic Cargo"	CBeebies	Eva Konstantopoulos	4 March 2021
A high-tech super robot wreaks havoc around Chuggington.
169	41	"The Zephie Express"	CBeebies	Thomas Hall	5 March 2021
Zephie attaches to a turbo car in an attempt to be faster than Koko.
170	42	"The Art of Chug Shui"	CBeebies	Ryan Toyama	8 March 2021
Cormac must visit the Repair Shed, and Tai is put in charge of the Drop and Load Yard.
171	43	"The Record Breakers"	CBeebies	Patrick Rieger	9 March 2021
Zephie and Piper attempt to prove they are ready for the big jobs in Chuggington.
172	44	"Brewster's Best Buddy"	CBeebies	Danielle Koenig	10 March 2021
Brewster tries to get busy Action Chugger to play a game of hide-and-seek.
173	45	"Superstar Brewster"	CBeebies	Veronica Wall-Reed	11 March 2021
Brewster gets himself in a jam when he accidentally takes credit for Rosa's work.
174	46	"You for a Day"	CBeebies	Ryan Toyama	12 March 2021
Wilson and Brewster switch places for the day to prove who has the tougher job.

=== Specials ===
No. overall	No. in series	Title	Original broadcaster	Original release date
1	1	"Chug Patrol: Ready to Rescue"	CBeebies	26 August 2013
Wilson joins the Chug Patrol rescue squad, and is mentored by new character Jackman. It's Wilson, Brewster and Koko's first day to try out their new advanced training gear. They head up to Rocky Ridge, where Koko and Brewster go into the mine and Wilson stays back to try out Chug Patrol 1, a mobile crane car. He feels the ground shake, and a wagon rolls away from him. While trying to stop the wagon, Wilson derails. Meanwhile, Brewster and Koko are in the mine when they feel the tremble. It knocks some stones onto the tracks which derail Koko and leave her dangling over an edge. Skylar then rescues Wilson and tells him he thinks the tremble came from Rocky Ridge Mine. Wilson remembers that Brewster and Koko are down there and races to the rescue, saving Koko just before the mine collapses. Then Emery breaks down in the forest. Wilson uses his new skills to locate Emery with the aid of a flare and gets him back on track with a huge crane. This Special Episode has a run time of just over 23 minutes. It is a combination of two episodes from Series 4 ("Rescue at Rocky Ridge" and "Wilson's Forest Flare") with additional footage providing a transition between the two episodes, including Wilson being shown the facilities offered by the new Chug Patrol Headquarters. Note: both of the included episodes have been broadcast in the UK as stand-alone episodes, with "Original UK Airdates" of 2 September 2013 ("Rocky Ridge") and 3 September 2013 ("Forest Flare").
2	2	"Chuggineers: Ready to Build"	CBeebies	7 November 2021
Stars Brewster and the Chuggineers. Brewster is mentored by new characters Zack, Fletch and Tyne. The Chuggineers work to build a new high speed link to Tootington. This Special Episode has a run time of about 24 minutes, and is an extended version of a combination of two episodes from Series 4 ("We Are the Chuggineers" and "The Tootington Tunnel"). Additional footage provides a transition between the two episodes, including showing Tyne returning the tunnel boring machine and Brewster laying track inside the tunnel. Payce tells Brewster that she is nervous about her first run, so Brewster lets her practice. It also includes an introduction to Cormac, showing him loading up the wagons of tunnel walls. Note: both of the included episodes have been broadcast in the UK as stand-alone episodes, with "Original UK Airdates" of 14 April 2014 ("Chuggineers") and 17 April 2014 ("Tootington"). This Special was first aired on Treehouse TV in Canada on 5 May 2014.
3	3	"Snow Rescue"	CBeebies	2 January 2021
Wilson has lots of rescuing to do in the hazardous winter weather. This special is a combination of two series 4 episodes, "Winter Whiteout" and "Snow Patrol", as an extended version, has the runtime of 24 minutes. Note: both of the included episodes have been broadcast in the UK as stand-alone episodes, with "Original UK Airdates" of 1 January 2014 ("Winter Whiteout") and 3 January 2014 ("Snow Patrol"). This Special was first released in Australia on 11 June 2014.
4	4	"Delivery Dash at the Docks"	CBeebies	21 November 2021
Koko is thrilled to be spending the day training with Daley, Chuggington's new express delivery engine. Together they pick up and deliver important packages all around Chuggington, frequenting the bustling docks where Skipper Stu, Chuggington's new Dock Master, is unloading and loading the ship. Through their adventures, Koko and Skipper Stu learn the importance of patience, paying careful attention to detail and, of course, teamwork as they commence with the Delivery Dash at the Docks! The special is a combination of two stand-alone series 5 episodes ("Koko Express") and ("Skipper Stu and the Steam Crane"), and with a little extra footage added, has the runtime of 24 minutes. Note: both of the included episodes have been broadcast in the UK as stand-alone episodes, with "Original UK Airdates" of 26 May 2015 ("Koko Express") and 27 May 2015 ("Skipper Stu and the Steam Crane"). This Special was first aired on Disney Junior in the USA on 19 September 2015.
5	5	"The Big Freeze"	CBeebies	26 December 2020
Freezing temperatures and a fire at the lighthouse mean trouble for Chuggington. This special is a combination of two stand-alone series 5 episodes, "Chug Patrol Chief" and "Fletch Shines". With a little extra footage added it has the runtime of 24 minutes. Note: both of the included episodes have been broadcast in the UK as stand-alone episodes, with "Original UK Airdates" of 28 May 2015 ("Chug Patrol Chief") and 29 May 2015 ("Fletch Shines").
6	6	"Celebrate Chuggington"	CBeebies	3 July 2021
It's time for a brand new holiday in the great big world of trains – Chuggington Day! The trainees embark on an adventure to remember, including a scavenger hunt and a quest for the perfect statue! The trainees learn the importance of training together.
7	7	"Chugging Home for the Holidays"	CBeebies	19 December 2021
The trainees set out to San Locomota to cheer up a homesick Rosa. Note 1: This was the first special to not combine 2 episodes into one, instead it tells an original story. Note 2: This special serves as the true series finale of the Chuggington franchise.

== Badge Quest (2010–2012) ==
In each episode, one or more of the trainees try to earn a particular badge by completing a specific task or accomplishing a certain goal.

No. overall	No. in series	Title	Directed by	Written by	Badge name	Original broadcaster	Original release date
1	1	"Weighing It Up"	Sarah Ball	Ross Hastings	Weighing It Up	CBeebies	24 July 2010
The trainees attempt to earn a badge by guessing weight. A dog getting onboard Brewster's car confuses matters.
2	2	"Brewster's Carwash"	Sarah Ball	Paul Couvela	Carwash	CBeebies	25 July 2010
Brewster and Koko must work together to wash dirty train cars.
3	3	"Rainbow Chuggers"	Sarah Ball	Polly Churchill and Lorelei King	Colour	CBeebies	31 July 2010
Brewster and Koko have to follow different clues to find carriages of particular colours.
4	4	"Chug Patrol"	Sarah Ball	Deirdra Morris and Sarah Ball	Chug Patrol	CBeebies	1 August 2010
Brewster and Koko try to break Emery's record for the most problems reported on the rails.
5	5	"Remember the Route"	Sarah Ball	Ross Hastings and Lorelei King	Remember the Route	CBeebies	7 August 2010
The trainees must memorize a list of three destinations and visit them in the correct order.
6	6	"Squeaky Clean"	Sarah Morris	Deirdra Morris	Squeaky Clean	CBeebies	8 August 2010
Brewster has to stay clean while transporting a load of compost.
7	7	"Honk Your Horns"	Sarah Ball	Emma Reeves	Horn Honking	CBeebies	14 August 2010
Wilson has to prove that he knows when to use his horn and when not to use it.
8	8	"Ready to Roll"	Sarah Ball	Sarah Ball and Lorelei King	Ready to Roll	CBeebies	15 August 2010
Before setting off on a long-distance night run, the trainees must make sure they complete all their safety checks.
9	9	"Capable Brewster"	Sarah Ball	Mark Caven	Capability	CBeebies	21 August 2010
Brewster is tasked with transporting many carriages to the quarry. The task isn't as easy as he initially thinks, and when he cannot get his load up a steep gradient near the quarry, he finds himself seeking out the help of his friends.
10	10	"Fire Safety"	Sarah Ball	Phil O'Shea	Fire Safety	CBeebies	22 August 2010
The trainees must demonstrate that they know what to do when there's a fire.
11	11	"Knowing Where You Are Going"	Sarah Ball	Lorelei King	Knowing Where You're Going	CBeebies	28 August 2010
Wilson needs to remember where he's going, and not let himself get distracted.
12	12	"Helping Wheels"	Sarah Ball	Lorelei King	Helping Wheels	CBeebies	29 August 2010
Brewster and Wilson must help others on and around the tracks.
13	13	"Running on Time"	Sarah Ball	Sarah Ball	Running on Time	CBeebies	4 September 2010
Brewster and Koko try to stay on schedule while transporting passengers.
14	14	"Animal Helper"	Sarah Ball	Sarah Ball	Animal Helper	CBeebies	5 September 2010
Brewster looks after Ebo the elephant while his safari park enclosure is being redone.
15	15	"Work Those Wheels"	Sarah Ball	Sarah Ball; Additional writing by: Morgan Overton	Work Those Wheels	CBeebies	11 September 2010
To get the badge, Wilson has to invent a new and fun workout for himself.
16	16	"Buddy Badge"	Sarah Ball	Ross Hastings	Buddy	CBeebies	12 September 2010
Koko and Brewster must learn to trust each other.
17	17	"Brewster & the Star Map"	Sarah Ball	Sarah Ball and Lorelei King	Star Map	CBeebies	18 September 2010
Koko, Wilson, and Brewster must use specific constellations as a guide to reach a destination.
18	18	"Emergency Emery"	Sarah Ball	Paul Matthew Thompson	Emergency	CBeebies	19 September 2010
Emery pretends to have broken down so that Wilson and Brewster can practice rescuing him, but he later breaks down for real.
19	19	"Koko's Cargo"	Sarah Ball	Brenda Scott Royce	Cargo	CBeebies	25 September 2010
Koko transports two different types of cargo from the farm.
20	20	"Concentrate Wilson!"	Sarah Ball	Sarah Ball	Concentration	CBeebies	26 September 2010
Wilson learns some tricks that will help him memorize things and so improve his concentration.
21	21	"Follow the Leader"	Sarah Ball	Paul Couvela and Sarah Ball	Follow the Leader	CBeebies	2 October 2010
Koko learns the best way to delegate tasks for delivering papers.
22	22	"Make Or Brake"	Sarah Ball	Ross Hastings	Good Judgement	CBeebies	3 October 2010
The trainees take a brake test. Wilson fails, but should he confess to it or hide his mistake?
23	23	"No Time to Waste"	Sarah Ball	Mark Caven	Clean Up	CBeebies	9 October 2010
The trainees learn about being efficient. They clean up litter to ensure it gets recycled, trying various methods to decide which way is the best.
24	24	"Quiet Please"	Sarah Ball	Sarah Ball	Quiet	CBeebies	10 October 2010
The trainees have to keep quiet all day.
25	25	"Keep Chuggington Beautiful"	Sarah Ball	Lorelei King	Keep Chuggington Beautiful	CBeebies	16 October 2010
The trainees each have to think of a way to make Chuggington even more beautiful.
26	26	"Who Do You Appreciate?"	Sarah Ball	Sarah Ball	Appreciation	CBeebies	17 October 2010
Both Brewster and Wilson are each given a shiny new badge, and must give it to someone they really appreciate. But how to choose?
27	27	"Town Criers"	Sarah Ball	Brenda Scott Royce	Town Crier	CBeebies	24 January 2011
Brewster and Wilson each have to make an announcement to the other chuggers.
28	28	"Couriers"	Sarah Ball	Emma Reeves	Courier	CBeebies	25 January 2011
Koko and Brewster must each deliver three packages before three o'clock.
29	29	"Fire Warden Wilson"	Sarah Ball	Emma Reeves	Fire Warden	CBeebies	26 January 2011
Wilson struggles to concentrate when working towards the Fire Warden badge.
30	30	"Home, Wilson!"	Sarah Ball	David Spicer	Find Your Way Home	CBeebies	27 January 2011
Wilson is sent to a mystery location and needs to find his way home.
31	31	"Pull Together"	Sarah Ball	David Spicer	Snow Rescue	CBeebies	28 January 2011
Wilson and Koko have to rescue a stranded chugger from the snow.
32	32	"Shape Up"	Sarah Ball	David Spicer	Loading	CBeebies	31 January 2011
Koko and Wilson struggle to fit awkward-shaped objects into an open goods carriage.
33	33	"Show & Tell Brewster"	Sarah Ball	David Spicer	Show & Tell	CBeebies	1 February 2011
Brewster invents a fun tour for visitors.
34	34	"Green Machines"	Sarah Ball	Emma Reeves	Green Machine	CBeebies	2 February 2011
Hoot and Toot have to recycle everything thoroughly.
35	35	"Chug & Click Wilson"	Sarah Ball	Abigail Jackson	Chug & Click	CBeebies	3 February 2011
Wilson has to use the camera carriage in three different ways.
36	36	"Service with a Smile"	Sarah Ball	David Spicer	Service with a Smile	CBeebies	4 February 2011
Wilson learns about good customer service.
37	37	"First Things First"	Sarah Ball	Lizzie Ennever	First Things First	CBeebies	7 February 2011
Hoot and Toot learn about setting priorities.
38	38	"Night Chuggers"	Sarah Ball	Sarah Ball	Night Chuggers	CBeebies	8 February 2011
Hoot and Toot must deliver their cargo before sunrise.
39	39	"Trainer Wilson"	Sarah Ball	Sarah Ball	Trainer	CBeebies	9 February 2011
Wilson has to teach Hoot and Toot how to use the paint wagon.
40	40	"Home Sweet Home"	Sarah Ball	Anna-Lisa Jenaer	Home Sweet Home	CBeebies	6 February 2012
Brewster learns about camouflage when he repaints the lizards' house.
41	41	"Safeguarder Wilson"	Sarah Ball	Michael Chappell	Safeguarder	CBeebies	7 February 2012
Wilson learns how to keep the tracks safe.
42	42	"Swift Shift"	Sarah Ball	Pete Reeves	Swift Shift	CBeebies	8 February 2012
Hoot and Toot have to round up all the stray carriages around the depot in record time.
43	43	"Look Out Brewster"	Sarah Ball	Michael Chappell	Look Out	CBeebies	9 February 2012
Brewster has to find potential safety hazards on the track.
44	44	"Wilson's Winter Feed"	Sarah Ball	Rick Vines	Animal Feed	CBeebies	10 February 2012
Wilson and Koko have to feed the animals in the snow, but Wilson has trouble finding the sheep.
45	45	"Share the Load"	Sarah Ball	Abigail Jackson	Share the Load	CBeebies	13 February 2012
Brewster learns to share the workload with his teammates.
46	46	"Mind Your Manners"	Sarah Ball	Heather Simms	Manners	CBeebies	14 February 2012
Decka teaches Toot that having good manners is about what you do, not just what you say. Tunnel Colour: Blue
