= Anna Walton =

English actress (born 1980)

- Born: Anna Walton; 18 December 1980 (age 44); Harpenden, Hertfordshire, England, United Kingdom
- Years active: 1997–present
- Height: 5 ft 11 in (1.80 m)

Anna Walton (born 18 December 1980) is an English actress known for her roles in Vampire Diary, Mutant Chronicles, and the compassionate Princess Nuala in Hellboy II: The Golden Army.

Walton began working as a model while still at Queenswood School in Hertfordshire and later trained in acting at the Oxford School of Drama, from which she graduated in 2004.

Walton appeared on NBC's Crusoe.

Walton's brother, Henry, was guitarist for the band Zulu Winter. She appeared in a music video for the band's hit single, "Silver Tongue".

== Filmography ==
Year	Title	Role
1997	Bright Hair	Melissa Bernett
1998	Out of Hours	Nicky Walsh
2007	Vampire Diary	Vicki
2007	A Girl and a Gun	Lucille
2008	Mutant Chronicles	Severian
2008	Hellboy II: The Golden Army	Princess Nuala
2008–2009	Crusoe	Susannah Crusoe
2010	Copelia	Agatha
2011	5 Days of War	Karin
2011	The Halloween Kid	Henry's Mother
2012	Deviation	Amber
2012	The Seasoning House	Violeta
2013–2017	Reign	Diane de Poitiers
2013	Soulmate	Audrey
2015	Cherry Tree	Sissy
2021	Mister Mayfair	Serena
