= Soulmate (2013 film) =

- Film poster
- Directed by: Axelle Carolyn
- Written by: Axelle Carolyn
- Produced by: Claire Otway
- Starring: Anna Walton; Tom Wisdom; Tanya Myers
- Cinematography: Sara Deane
- Edited by: Simon J. Brooks; Eddie Oswald
- Music by: Christian Henson
- Production companies: Forecast Features; ScreenProjex; Sterling Pictures Ltd.
- Distributed by: Revolver Entertainment
- Release dates: 18 October 2013 (Sitges); 11 August 2014
- Running time: 104 minutes
- Country: United Kingdom
- Language: English
- Budget: £600,000

Soulmate is a 2013 British mystery horror film directed by Axelle Carolyn in her feature film directorial debut. The film stars Anna Walton as a woman who travels to the countryside to recuperate after a suicide attempt but finds that her cottage is haunted by a ghost.

Soulmate was initially refused a rating certificate by the British Board of Film Classification due to its opening scene and Carolyn was required to edit out portions of the scene. The film had its world premiere on 18 October 2013 at the Sitges Film Festival in Spain.

== Synopsis ==
Devastated by the loss of her husband from a car accident, Audrey (Anna Walton) tries to commit suicide but is saved from death by her sister Alex (Emma Cleasby). She decides that the best course of action would be to stay in a cottage in the secluded Welsh countryside, where she will try to overcome her loss and her personal feelings of guilt about her husband's death. On her first day there, Audrey meets local Theresa (Tanya Myers) and her husband Dr Zellaby (Nick Brimble), who tell her about the cottage's previous owner, Douglas (Tom Wisdom), that died 30 years prior due to suicide. Soon Audrey begins to hear strange noises and discovers a locked door, which Zellaby states has not been opened since Douglas's death. Eventually the noises become too much for her and Audrey forces the door open to discover that it has many various items belonging to Douglas, including letters from his fiancée Nell (Rebecca Kiser). At this point, Douglas begins to manifest himself within the house, revealing himself to Audrey. The two are able to converse with one another but cannot physically interact and they begin to form an emotional bond. However, as time passes, the question arises as to whether or not Douglas is a kindred spirit or something more sinister.

== Cast ==
- Anna Walton as Audrey
- Tom Wisdom as Douglas
- Tanya Myers as Theresa
- Nick Brimble as Dr Zellaby
- Emma Cleasby as Alex
- Guy Armitage as Tristan
- Rebecca Kiser as Nell
- Amelia Tyler as Nell (voice)
- Felix Coles as Young Theresa

== Production ==
Carolyn was inspired to create Soulmate after getting lost in the English countryside, where she discovered "this spooky little village hidden in a hollow, on a dark cloudy day." She also liked the idea of "finding comfort in the supernatural ... because if there are ghosts, there's an afterlife, and the people you've lost are not gone forever." Finding an appropriate filming location caused some difficulties, as she wanted to find a cottage that was "small enough to be cozy and atmospheric, but large enough to accommodate a film crew". As the film's crew was unable to afford tents or trailers for the duration of filming, crew members would have to perform their work in unoccupied rooms of the cottage and relocate as needed for film shots.

=== Rating ===
Prior to release, the film was met with resistance from the British Board of Film Classification (BBFC), who found the opening scene of Audrey attempting suicide by slicing her wrists to be objectionable. The BBFC required the removal of 16 seconds of footage to receive an 18 certificate. The proposed removal centered predominantly upon footage of the knife or Audrey's wrists, and ultimately Carolyn chose to remove the scene entirely, as she felt that removing only portions of the scene would result in a "mangled, limp version that would’ve diminished the impact needed and made Audrey’s suicide attempt look painless and easy."

The BBFC's decision was met with some derision by media and Internet bloggers, and multiple people mentioned films that contained objectionable elements such as gory death scenes (Hostel), necrophilia (Nekromantik), or extended rape scenes (Irréversible) without requiring edits. The opening scene is present in some international versions.

== Reception ==
Nerdly gave Soulmate a favorable review, writing "Traditional ghost stories are few and far between these days, you’re more likely to find a ghost at the end of a camcorder than conversing with the living in most movies and so Soulmate actually feels, despite its traditionalism, fresh and new." Dread Central was mostly positive in their review, giving the film an overall rating of four stars but noted that the ending was too open for interpretation for their liking. HorrorNews.net was also mostly positive, noting that the film would not appeal to all audiences and that "Fans of romantic, period piece fear feasts that challenge you will surely not be disappointed." Anton Bitel of BFI panned Soulmate, writing "The shrill melodrama of the film’s climax seemed out of keeping with both the creeping pace of what had preceded and the subtle ambiguity of the final scene – an ambiguity so underplayed that several FrightFesters with whom I spoke afterwards seemed, like the film’s own sceptic character Dr Zellaby, unconvinced that it was there at all."

=== Awards ===
- Mary Shelley International Award for Best Director at Fantafestival (2014, won)
- International Fantasy Film Award for Best Actress at Fantasporto (2014, won - Anna Walton)
