= Keith-Lee Castle =

British actor

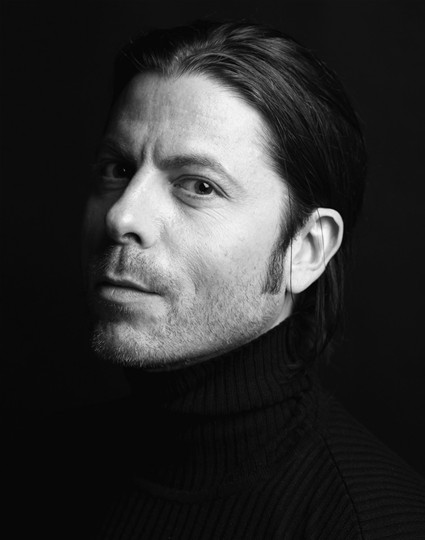
- Born: 14 September 1968 (age 58); England, UK
- Occupation: Actor
- Years active: 1996–present

Keith-Lee Castle (born 14 September 1968) is a British actor. He is best known for playing Count Dracula in the CBBC series Young Dracula (2006-2014).

== Career ==
Throughout his career, he has guest-starred in numerous television shows, mostly British. He has also appeared in several films, including playing 'the psychotic Psychs', the owner of the doll, in Seed of Chucky (2004), and Clarence Weasel in The Wind in the Willows (1996), based on the popular book. To portray the rather loony weasel he wore small furry ears, a long tail and a long, yellow swishing coat. He also had a small part in Velvet Goldmine (1998) and in EastEnders (1999) as Dean Collins. In 2000, Castle starred in the Urban Gothic episode "Vampirology", in which he play a Soho vampire followed around by a documentary crew.

To his younger viewers, he is probably best known for his role in the CBBC series Young Dracula, which debuted 2006 and ended in 2014, as the infamous and evil Count Dracula, father to Vlad and Ingrid Dracula, he starred alongside Gerran Howell and Clare Thomas in which his character appeared in every episode.

Castle's other roles include Patrick in the film Doghouse in 2009; the character of Patrick was formerly a high powered businessman but now more interested in playing golf and meditating, despite his wives dislike to the idea. He also played Baron, a money making football hooligan in the 2014 film The Hooligan Factory. In 2015, Castle also starred in a short film called The Stranger Kind alongside Eleanor Tomlinson, where he played Number Six; a dark, disguised magician. It then went onto be nominated for an award at the New York Horror Film Festival in 2015.

== Filmography ==
=== Film ===
Year	Film	Role	Notes
1996	The Wind in the Willows	Clarence Weasel	
1998	Velvet Goldmine	Harley	
2004	Seed of Chucky	Bill 'Psychs' Sykes	
2006	Vampire Diary	Eddie Strode	
2009	Doghouse	Patrick	
2009	Dead Man Running	Orlando	
2014	The Hooligan Factory	The Baron	
2016	We Still Steal the Old Way	Chas	
2019	The Car: Road to Revenge	Payne	

=== Television ===
Year	Title	Role	Notes
1996	This Life	Truelove	4 episodes
1996	Jack and Jeremy's Real Lives		Episode: "Aristocrats"
1998	Big Women	Lennie	2 episodes
1998	Dangerfield	Andy Lane	Episode: "A Place of Safety"
1999	EastEnders	Dean Collins	
2000	Urban Gothic	Rex	Episode: "Vampirology"
2000	Doctors	Wayne Thomas	Episode: "Slim Chance"
2001	In Deep	Andy Lester	Episode: "Ghost Squad"
2001	Lexx	Renfield	Episode: "Walpurgis Night"
2001	Beech Is Back	Giorgio	Mini-series
2004	Grease Monkeys	Wolfbane	Episode: "Little Star"
2004	Holby City	Phil	Episode: "Casualty @ Holby City"
2004	Casualty	Phil	Episode: "Casualty @ Holby City"
2006	The Bill	Chris Hammond	Episode: "Connections"
2006	Doctors	Marcus Strang	Episode: "The Friends of Mary Magee"
2006–2014	Young Dracula	Count Dracula	Series regular
2007	Casualty	Leaky	Episode: "The Miracle on Harry's Last Shift"
