= Tom Wisdom =

English actor (born 1973)

- Born: Thomas Anthony Wisdom; 18 February 1973 (age 53); Swindon, Wiltshire, England, UK
- Education: Taunton's College; Academy Drama School
- Occupation: Actor
- Years active: 1994–present

Tom Wisdom (born 18 February 1973) is an English actor of theatre, film, and television. His performing roles include Astinos in the film 300 and the Archangel Michael in the television series Dominion.

== Career ==
On television, Wisdom played Tom Ferguson in the long-running soap Coronation Street (1999–2000), Ivor Claire in the Evelyn Waugh adaptation Sword of Honour (2001), Stephen Clarke in the thriller Suspicion (2003) and Marco Bailey in Sky One's airline drama Mile High (2003–04). Other television work includes Harry Enfield's Brand Spanking New Show, Children of the New Forest, Wycliffe and Blackhearts in Battersea. In early 2010, Wisdom starred in an episode of Agatha Christie's Poirot. He had a one-episode guest role in NBC's Hannibal as Antony Dimmond in 2015. Wisdom also starred as the archangel Michael in SyFy Channel's Dominion, which began airing in June 2014 and was renewed for a second (and final) season which concluded on 1 October 2015.

Wisdom's notable theatre roles include Journey's End (UK tour, 2005) as Stanhope and Guy Bennett in Julian Mitchell's Another Country (Arts Theatre, 2000). Wisdom created and subsequently played the role of Steven Carter in Patrick Wilde's 1994 play What's Wrong With Angry?.

Wisdom's films include his role as Ryan in Hey Mr DJ (2003), Astinos in 300 (2007), and as 'Midnight' Mark in the 2009 film The Boat That Rocked. Other film roles were in The Sisterhood of the Traveling Pants 2 (2008), The Lightkeepers (2010), Romeo and Juliet (2013), and as Douglas Talbot in Soulmate (2013).

== Filmography ==
Title	Year	Role	Type	Notes
Good King Wenceslas	1994	Jan Turek	TV Movie	
Black Hearts in Battersea	1996	Fothers	TV Series	4 Episodes
Wycliffe	1996	Neil Pender	TV Series	Episode "Last Judgement"
Escape to Somerset	1998	Matthew	Short	
Wavelength	1998	Russell	TV Series	Episode "Cartoon Boyfriend"
Children of the New Forest	1998	Edward Beverly	TV Movie	
Coronation Street	1999–2000	Tom Ferguson	TV Series	
Brand Spanking New Show	2000	Various roles	TV Series	5 Episodes
Sword of Honour	2001	Ivor Clare	TV Movie	
Suspicion	2003	Stephen Clarke	TV Movie	2 Episodes
Hey Mr DJ	2003	Ryan	Film	
Mile High	2003–05	Marco Bailey	TV Series	
300	2006	Astinos	Film	
Fire and Ice: The Dragon Chronicles	2008	Gabriel	TV Movie	
The Sisterhood of the Traveling Pants 2	2008	Ian	Film	
The Boat That Rocked	2009	'Midnight' Mark, DJ	Film	Also known by the title "Pirate Radio".
Agatha Christie's Poirot	2010	Oliver Manders	TV Series	Episode "Three Act Tragedy"
The Lightkeepers	2010	John Brown / Russell Brooks	Film	
Above Suspicion	2012	Scott Meyers	TV Series	2 Episodes
Romeo and Juliet	2013	Count Paris	Film	
Soulmate	2013	Douglas Talbot	Film	
Eternal Return	2013	Henry	Short	
Dominion	2014–2015	Michael	TV Series	
Hannibal	2015	Antony Dimmond	TV Series	Episode "Antipasto"
Molly Moon And The Incredible Book Of Hypnotism	2015	Charlie Cooper	Film	
Bones	2016	Chadwick Grey	TV Series	Episode "The Jewel In The Crown"
Endeavour	2018	Gerard Pickman	TV Series	Episode "Muse"
Interference	2018	Marcus	Film	
Avengers: Endgame	2019	Loki Reader	Film	
Enemy Lines	2020	Sergeant Will Davidson	Film	
