= Phil O'Shea =

English screenwriter, director and producer

Phil O'Shea is an English screenwriter, director and producer. He has written and directed films starring Jude Law and Billie Piper.

== Filmography ==
- The Crane, director and writer
- Vampire Diary, co-director and writer
- Spirit Trap, writer
- Dream Team (TV series), writer
- Wycliffe (TV series), writer
- Stig of the Dump (BBC TV Series - BAFTA award), writer: script polish
- Yellowthread Street, writer
- Chuggington, writer
- Oscar Charlie, writer
