= Vampire Diary =

2007 film by Phil O'Shea

- Directed by: Mark James; Phil O'Shea
- Written by: Phil O'Shea
- Produced by: Margaret Matheson; Michael Riley
- Starring: Anna Walton; Morven Macbeth; Jamie King; Kate Sissons; Justin McDonald; Keith-Lee Castle
- Cinematography: Nemone Mercer
- Edited by: Mark Atkins, Mark James
- Music by: Simon Russell
- Distributed by: Peccadillo Pictures, Monarch Films, Optimale
- Release dates: 23 March 2007 (London Lesbian and Gay Film Festival)
- Running time: 90 minutes
- Country: United Kingdom
- Language: English

Vampire Diary is a 2007 horror film directed by Mark James and Phil O'Shea, produced by Michael Riley and Margaret Matheson, and starring Anna Walton. It was first released in the United Kingdom by Peccadillo Pictures.

== Cast ==
- Anna Walton
- Morven Macbeth
- Jamie Thomas King
- Kate Sissons
- Justin McDonald
- Keith-Lee Castle

== Awards ==
- Best Film Milan International Film Festival (Michael Riley and Margaret Matheson)
- Best Actor Milan International Film Festival (Anna Walton)
- Best Cinematography Milan International Film Festival (Nemone Mercer)
- Best Editing Milan International Film Festival (Mark Atkins and Mark James)
