= The Wind in the Willows (1996 film) =

1996 film by Terry Jones

- UK DVD cover
- Directed by: Terry Jones
- Screenplay by: Terry Jones
- Based on: The Wind in the Willows by Kenneth Grahame
- Produced by: Jake Eberts; John Goldstone
- Starring: Terry Jones; Eric Idle; Steve Coogan; Nicol Williamson; John Cleese; Julia Sawalha; Victoria Wood; Stephen Fry; Michael Palin; Antony Sher
- Cinematography: David Tattersall
- Edited by: Julian Doyle
- Music by: John Du Prez
- Production company: Allied Filmmakers
- Distributed by: Guild Pathé Cinema
- Release date: 11 October 1996
- Running time: 88 minutes
- Country: United Kingdom
- Language: English
- Budget: £9.7 million
- Box office: £1.3 million

The Wind in the Willows (released on VHS and DVD as Mr. Toad's Wild Ride in the United States) is a 1996 British adventure comedy film based on Kenneth Grahame's 1908 novel The Wind in the Willows, adapted and directed by Terry Jones, and produced by Jake Eberts and John Goldstone. The film stars Jones, Steve Coogan, Eric Idle and Nicol Williamson. While positively regarded by critics, the film was given only a very limited theatrical release in the U.S. due to a lawsuit between Columbia Pictures and Disney.

== Plot ==
Mole's underground home is caved in when the meadow above is crushed by a steam shovel driven by Weasels. The Water Rat takes Mole to see Mr. Toad, who encourages them to join them in his new horse-drawn caravan. After a motor car frightens the horse and the caravan tips over, Toad becomes infatuated with motoring. He is a terrible driver and funds his cars with loans from the Weasels; their vindictive Chief blackmails him to sell Toad Hall.

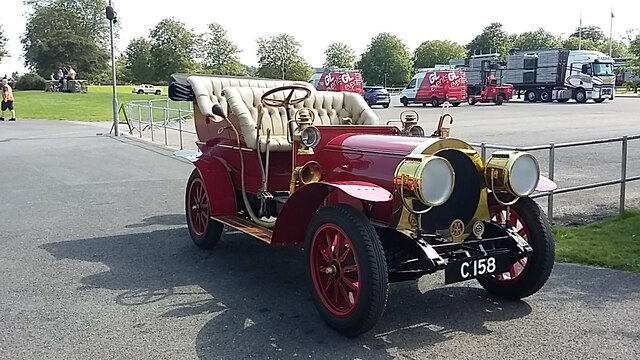
Mr. Toad's car was made in 1996, here seen with license "C 158" at the National Motor Museum, Beaulieu in England, in 2021.

After an encounter with Weasels in the Wild Wood, Toad, Rat, and Mole end up in Mr. Badger's underground house. Badger attempts to quell Toad's obsession with cars, but Toad refuses to listen and is ultimately arrested for stealing and crashing a motor-car outside a pub. During Toad's trial, the Chief Weasel poses as a rabbit and manipulates the jury into giving a guilty verdict. After Toad has an outburst in Court and tries to escape, the Judge gives him a 100-year sentence in a castle dungeon.

Back at Toad Hall, Rat and Mole are evicted by the Weasels, who have taken Toad Hall for themselves. They tunnel under the castle to free Toad, who is assisted by the jailer's daughter and her sardonic tea lady aunt. Toad, Rat, and Mole board Engine No. 592, thanks to the engine driver's help of letting them ride on the footplate. The police, who have stowed away on the carriages behind the engine, demand that the train be stopped by waving furiously at Ratty, Moley, and the driver on the engine, much to Toad's fearing terror. As the engine driver goes to see what the police want and tries to stop the train, Toad confesses the truth and begs the driver to help him evade his captors about arresting him for stealing motorcars. Feeling sympathetic of what Toad says is true, the driver agrees to help as the police shoot the paint on his engine. Angered, he tosses coal from his engine's tender at the police, but fails to dodge a mail catcher, which catches him and ends up holding him from his train. Toad hijacks the train, and as Mole accidentally uncouples the coaches, he and Rat are left far behind with the coaches as the police hit a tunnel and hold on for dear life, Toad eventually derails the engine, and having survived the accident from the wreckage of the engine, sets off again, but is abducted by the Weasels.

The full extent of the Weasels' plans are now revealed: they have built a dog-food factory over the remains of Mole's abode and are planning to blow up Toad Hall and build a slaughterhouse in its place, with which they will turn all of the peaceful Riverbankers into dog food. They have also damaged the area near to Badger's home, which provokes him into wanting revenge against them. Badger and Rat attempt to infiltrate Toad Hall disguised as weasels, but are discovered. Along with Toad, they are placed over the factory's mincing machine. The Chief, Clarence and Geoffrey return to Toad Hall to prepare the victory celebration, leaving St. John in charge of the machine. Mole, who has broken into the factory, disables the machine allowing Toad, Badger and Rat to escape.

In a premature sense of victory, Clarence and Geoffrey attempt to murder their Chief using a birthday cake. Clarence and Geoffrey begin to fight each other for leadership, with the other Weasels drunkenly taking sides. This distraction allows the protagonists to stage a raid on the house, leaving all of the Weasels incapacitated in the ensuing fight. It turns out that the Chief has survived the coup against his life. Toad attempts to stop him from reaching the factory, which contains the detonator to blow up Toad Hall, to no avail. Unbeknownst to both of them, the explosives are actually in the factory (Rat and Mole had switched the labels on the explosive's containers earlier, leading the Weasels to believe the explosives were actually bone supplies for the factory), and as such the Chief blows himself up along with the factory, leaving Toad Hall intact and Toad's friends alive.

Afterwards, Toad makes a public speech swearing off motor cars and promising to be more mature and less selfish in the future. Mole's home has been repaired. However, Toad is seen secretly talking to an airplane salesman, which shows that he has only moved on to a new craze. Toad flies over the crowd in his new plane, causing mass hysteria and a disappointed Badger swears never to help Toad again. During the end credits, Toad flies across the country and eventually over the sea.

== Cast ==
- Terry Jones as Mr. Toad
- Steve Coogan as Mole
- Eric Idle as Rat
- Nicol Williamson as Mr. Badger
- Antony Sher as The Chief Weasel
- Michael Palin as The Sun
- Keith-Lee Castle as Clarence Weasel
- Robert Bathurst as St John Weasel
- Nigel Planer as The Car Salesman
- John Boswall as the Elderly Gentleman
- Stephen Fry as The Judge
- Roger Ashton-Griffiths as The Prosecution Counsel
- John Cleese as Mr. Toad's Lawyer
- Julia Sawalha as The Jailer's Daughter
- Victoria Wood as The Tea Lady
- Don Henderson as The Sentry
- Richard Ridings as The Guard
- Bernard Hill as The Engine Driver
- Nick Gillard as a stunt double
- Rick Driscoll as The Balladeer (voice)
- Richard James as Geoffrey Weasel and Mole's Clock

== Songs featured in the film ==
- "Messing About On The River" (Tony Hatch) – sung at the beginning by Rat, as he and Mole set out for a picnic on the river
- "Secret of Survival" – sung by the Weasels, explaining that they're only out for themselves
- "Mr. Toad" – sung by Toad, with lyrics taken directly from the novel, split into three sections (one covering his escape from Toad Hall, one during his trial and one after the train crash with SE&CR C Class 0-6-0 tender engine No. 592)
- "Friends Is What We Is" – sung by Toad, Badger, Mole and Rat, as they drive the Weasels out of Toad Hall and during the party at the end
- "Miracle of Friends" – the song played during the end credits

== Production ==
The Wind in the Willows was produced by Allied Filmmakers. Most of the then-living members of the Monty Python comedy troupe heavily participated in the film: Jones and Idle play major roles as Mr. Toad and Rat, but Cleese and Palin have minor roles, as Toad's inept defence lawyer and a sardonic talking Sun, respectively, who occasionally chastises Toad for his reckless behaviour, and briefly speaks to Ratty and Mole. Terry Gilliam was asked to voice "The River", but filming conflicts with 12 Monkeys kept him from doing so. As a result, "The River" only has one instance of dialogue - he is shown with a mouth and sings lines of the first song.

=== Filming ===
- Railway scenes were done on the Bluebell Railway, disguised as a part of the South Eastern & Chatham Railway (the Bluebell is home to a number of SE&CR locomotives, and as part of the old London, Brighton & South Coast Railway, the neighbouring railway to the SE&CR the disguise was not difficult to complete effectively).
- The outside of Toad Hall: Kentwell Hall in Suffolk.
- External scenes of the Gaol: Dover Castle in Kent.
- The Old School, now the post office in Chiddingstone, is the Welcome Inn where Toad dines before stealing and crashing a motorcar.

== Distribution ==
As part of an arbitrated award in a lawsuit against Disney, Columbia Pictures was given the U.S. theatrical distribution rights to the film, but the home video rights remained with Disney. Because Columbia did not have the home video rights, they decided not to promote or widely distribute the theatrical release. Takings in the UK had been low due to largely afternoon-only screenings. The New York Times published a very positive review by Lawrence Van Gelder. Jones was in New York at the time of the film's US release, and heard that the film was showing in Times Square, "so I rushed down there only to discover it was showing at one of those seedy little porno theatres".

In 1998, Disney released the film on VHS (and later on DVD in 2004) as Mr. Toad's Wild Ride, to tie into their theme park ride at Disneyland and Walt Disney World until the latter was replaced by The Many Adventures of Winnie the Pooh in 2000.

== Reception ==
=== Box office ===
The film opened on 17 screens in Scotland and the Midlands on 11 October 1996 and grossed £6,121 in its opening weekend. It expanded to 230 screens on 18 October and grossed £375,795 for the week, placing seventh at the UK box office. It went on to gross £1.3 million in the U.K. and $72,844 in the U.S.

=== Critical response ===
The film holds a 75% approval rating on Rotten Tomatoes, based on 8 reviews and holds three stars out of five on the film critic website AllMovie.com. Film critic Mike Hertenstein wrote a positive critical review of the film.

The films won the Best of the Fest award at the Chicago International Children's Film Festival in 1998 and the WisKid Award at the Wisconsin International Children's Film Festival in 2000.

The San Francisco Chronicle reported that The Wind in the Willows was one of the best movies of 1997, according to ratings by 40 major critics. In particular only a single film, When We Were Kings, achieved a higher average rating from critics.
