= The Crane =

- Directed by: Phil O'Shea
- Written by: Phil O'Shea
- Produced by: Michael Kelk; Kate Ogborn; Sally Randle
- Starring: Jude Law; Lee Ross; Joseph Bennett; Callum Coates; Ray Newe; Isobel Raine; Melanie Ramsey; David Schofield
- Cinematography: Ivan Bird
- Edited by: Rodney Holland
- Music by: Terry Devine-King
- Distributed by: British Film Institute
- Release date: 1992
- Running time: 16 minutes
- Country: United Kingdom
- Language: English

The Crane is a 1992 short film distributed by the British Film Institute.

The movie is set in London. The filming location was the Acton shopping precinct.

The film took place at the 36th London Film Festival in 1992.

== Cast ==
- Jude Law as Young man
- Lee Ross as Burger bar manager
- Melanie Ramsay as Young woman
- Callum Coates as Burger bar skinhead
- Joseph Bennett as Youth in wheelchair
- Isobel Raine as nurse
- Ray Newe as Evangelist skinhead
- David Schofield as Evangelist
