= Chuggington =

British animated children's television series

- Also known as: Chuggington: Tales from the Rails (series 6)
- Genre: Comedy
- Created by: Sarah Ball
- Directed by: Sarah Ball; Xiao-dong Xu (2008–2009); Julie Phillips (2008)
- Voices of: Tony Terraciano; Jordan C. Reed; Miles J. Harvey; Jacks Dean; Brigid Harrington; Madigan Kacmar
- Theme music composer: Chris McHale
- Opening theme: "Honk Your Horns"
- Ending theme: "Honk Your Horns" (Instrumental) (Series 1–5) "Let's Train Together" (Series 6)
- Composers: Chris McHale (2008–2013); Karam Salem (2020–2021); Alex Geringas (2020)
- Country of origin: United Kingdom
- Original language: English
- No. of series: 6
- No. of episodes: 174 (list of episodes)

Production
- Producers: Jacqueline White; Sarah Ball (series 1); Toshiaki Okuno (series 6); Junichi Yanagihara (series 6)
- Editors: Jane Hicks; Yvonne Daviesbr />Ben Williams-Butt (series 6); Amy Meyer (series 1); Jill Garrett (series 1); Andrew Hassenruck (series 1); Jamie England (series 6); Zyggy Markiewicz (series 6)
- Running time: 10 minutes 4 minutes (Badge Quest)
- Production companies: Ludorum (series 1–5); Herschend Entertainment Studios (series 6)

Original release
- Network: CBeebies
- Release: 22 September 2008 – 19 December 2021

Related
- Chuggington: Badge Quest

Ludorum plc
- Type: Public limited company
- Traded as: LSE: LUD
- Industry: Mass Media, Animation
- Founded: 9 May 2005; 21 years ago
- Founders: Rob Lawes; Dick Rockhopft
- Defunct: 29 December 2019; 6 years ago
- Fate: Liquidated
- Number of employees: About 150

Chuggington characters in their roundhouse

Chuggington, also known as Chuggington: Tales from the Rails in series 6, is a British animated television series aimed at pre-school children, produced by Ludorum plc and Herschend Entertainment Studios. It is broadcast on the BBC's CBeebies channel in the United Kingdom, Disney Jr. in the United States, and other channels internationally. Production consisted of six series, running from 2008 to 2021.

== Setting ==
In the fictional city of Chuggington are young novice anthropomorphic railway locomotives, called "Trainees", Wilson, Koko, and Brewster. The trainees and sometimes the more experienced locomotives learn the value of loyal friendship, telling the truth, listening carefully, persisting under adversity, completing tasks, resolving conflict without violence and similar values. The locomotives, called "Chuggers", are intelligent, empathetic, independent and somewhat self-directed. They have mobile facial and body features (i.e. other than Olwin, all chuggers have eyebrows that resemble windscreen wipers). Chuggers have no drivers, yet some engines have crew doors that can be opened. Chuggers regularly interact with humans such as passengers and maintenance staff. Some chuggers are modelled after well-known real world locomotives from various countries.

The city of Chuggington has a central area of large modern buildings. Side-by-side railway tunnels, coloured red, blue, yellow and green run out of the main depot and go beyond the city, leading to the outside world. The four rail lines lead to four different places; the blue line is to a large quarry with a system of mine tunnels, a green line which runs through the countryside, a red line which runs to a harbour and port, and the yellow line which runs through the city centre and to the neighboring town of Tootington.

== Episodes ==
Series	Episodes	U.K. airdate		U.S. airdate	
Series	Episodes	First aired	Last aired	First aired	Last aired
1	52	29 September 2008	11 May 2009	18 January 2010	7 January 2011
2	26	13 September 2010	15 December 2010	14 February 2011	16 January 2012
3	14	28 November 2011	15 December 2011	26 March 2012	3 August 2013
4	26	27 August 2013	21 April 2014	20 October 2013	5 December 2014
5	10	18 May 2015	29 May 2015	6 March 2015	28 November 2015
6	46	2 January 2021	12 March 2021	29 June 2020	1 November 2021
Specials	7	26 August 2013	19 December 2021	20 October 2013	7 March 2021
Badge Quest	46	24 July 2010	14 February 2012	26 September 2011	2 July 2013

== Characters ==
Wilson, Koko, and Brewster are the main characters in Chuggington.

=== Young trainees ===
==== Main ====
Name	Description	Voiced by (UK)	Voiced by (US)
Wilson	A red diesel-electric hybrid chugger whose enthusiasm is opposed by his short attention span and most of his adventures as of the fourth series are in Chug Patrol as an advanced trainee. He is one of the three main protagonists in the series. His catchphrase is "Let's ride the rails!"	Morgan Overton (first, second and third series); Edward Sharpe (fourth and fifth series); Teddy West (sixth series)	Tony Terraciano (first, second, third, fourth and fifth series); Jordan C. Reed (sixth series)
Brewster	A strong, blue and yellow diesel chugger built to pull heavy loads. He is as of the fourth series a member of the Chugginers, the building team on Chuggington. He likes to haul heavy loads on pickups and often picks up too much load. Other chuggers may rush when given a task, but Brewster asks questions if he is unsure. He is dependable, respectful and can be relied on when there is trouble. His catchphrase is "Honking horns!"	Charlie George (first, second and third series); Toby Baddeley (fourth and fifth series); Harry Reeve (sixth series)	Miles J Harvey (first, second, third, fourth and fifth series); Jacks Dean (sixth series)
Koko	A green, white, and purple electric engine who was built for high speed, being one of the fastest chuggers in Chuggington and serving as a part of the city's "Speed Fleet" since the fourth series. She loves to explore, have adventures and to challenge her friends to a dare or a race. Although she can get into mischief, she always means well and knows when to apologise. Her catchphrase is "Traintastic!"	Imogen Bailey (first, second, third, fourth and fifth series); Alyssa Burton (sixth series)	Brigid Harrington (first, second, third, fourth and fifth series); Madigan Kacmar (sixth series)

==== Non-advanced ====
Name	Description	Voiced by (UK)	Voiced by (US)
Hoot and Toot	Two conjoined twin diesel-electric trainees who are nearly always joined back-to-back, but in at least two episodes by strong pulling they manage to separate. Their catchphrase is "Hoot and Toot are ready to scoot!".	Tommy Romer Lee (Hoot; second, third, fourth and fifth series); Mihira Philip (Toot; second and fifth series); Beau Robertson (Hoot; sixth series onwards); Matilda Majilton (Toot; sixth series onwards)	Ben Hudson (Hoot; second to fifth series) and Tori Feinstein (Toot; second and fifth series); Ethan Cutillo (Hoot; sixth series onwards); Vivian Watson (Toot; sixth series onwards)
Hodge	A custom-built one of a kind, and a brown six-wheeled chugger built from hodge-podge parts. He normally works with Eddie and is a bit like a pickup truck. He is also often tasked with taking the rubbish to the recycling yard. With his "seen it all" attitude, it takes a lot to get Hodge excited. His catchphrase is "T'rrific!"	Arthur Lee (first five series); Lawrence Matthews (sixth series onwards)	James Lukens (first five series); Gideon Modisett (sixth series onwards)
Emery	A grey electric multiple unit passenger chugger often seen on elevated lines or in tunnels. He likes tricking and harassing other engines into thinking that they have a problem. He often carries an additional carriage or truck with him permanently, although in at least two episodes, he disconnects his carriage to go faster. He often announces his actions with transit announcements. He has heterochromia iridium. In the Polish dub, he is female and named Emilia. He has the most English voice actors of all characters, with a total of 6. His catchphrase is "This chugger is ready to depart!" which he uses when exiting a station.	Jordan Clarke	Troy Doherty (first and second series); Hugh Reynolds (third series); Jake Tanner (fourth and fifth series); Austin Connelly (sixth series onwards); Dylan Curtis (Odd Train Out)
Zephie	A young scissor-lift lime green and brown chugger who can lift and rotate her cab which allows Eddie to work on things not normally accessible. She is particularly flighty and giggly. Her catchphrase is "Yippee!".	Jadie Rose Hobson (first, second, third and fourth series); Lola Shepelev (sixth series onwards)	Isabella Palmieri (first, second, third and fourth series); Lily Sanfelippo (sixth series onwards)
Piper	An orange cab-forward steam engine and the newest trainee. In her first episode, Old Puffer Pete says that she runs on vegetable oil. In another episode we find out that Piper can be mischievous. Though she means well, she is very inexperienced and won't often take time to think, but realises her mistakes and does well in the end.	Eve Bentley (first, second, third and fourth series); Faith Delaney (sixth series onwards)	Eve Bentley (first, second, third and fourth series); Dakota Philips (sixth series onwards)
Tai	A purple trainee shunter from Zheng-Chu who works at the Docks. She reuses Calley's model from the first & third series.	Mia Lakha	Angelica Hale

=== Adult chuggers ===
Name	Description	Voiced by (UK)	Voiced by (US)
Old Puffer Pete	An elderly black and red steam chugger in Chuggington and the annual Chugger Championship Race winner. Pete loves passing his wisdom on to the trainees or anyone who is willing to listen. He drives them mad with his endless stories and can never seem to remember the chuggers' names, but they are very fond of him. He works at the central distribution centres for Chuggington: The Drop Load and Freight Yard. His catchphrase is "Rattling rivets!".	Paul Panting	Brian Greene (first, second, third, fourth and fifth series); Mick Wingert (sixth series onwards)
Olwin	An old, dark green steam locomotive who refers to the "trainees" as her "little chugg-a-chuggs". Olwin's coal is stored just forward of the cab, while her water is stored inside of her boiler, making her a tank locomotive. Olwin has orange arch-shaped handles for eyebrows, unlike all of the other chuggers whose eyebrows resemble windscreen wipers, making her the only chugger with this distinction.	Jill Shilling	Margaret Robertson (first, second, third and fourth series); Bernice Stegers (fifth series)
Harrison	A blue diesel-electric hybrid locomotive who is often proud of himself and therefore tends to show off and is often admired by Wilson. He, along with Hanzo and Koko, is considered one of the fastest chuggers in Chuggington. His catchphrase is "Mind your bumpers coming through!".	Colin McFarlane	
Irving	A dark red diesel engine who handles the rubbish and recycling chores around the depot. He is proud to boast that nothing is thrown away in Chuggington.	Paul Panting	John Pohlhammer
Dunbar	A lime and green Scottish (Southern American in the US Dub) diesel-electric hybrid chugger who is largely responsible for the training of the Chuggers: Hoot, Toot and Piper. He left Chuggington during the third series and was replaced by Skylar as the trainer.	Andy Nyman	Tom Clarke-Hill
Calley	A small orange and green shunting engine who spends most of her time as a rescue chugger, but can also sometimes be seen shunting rolling stock. She was Dunbar's assistant from the first & third series until she joined Jackman in the fourth series and became a member of the rescue squad Chug Patrol, where she was repainted in Chug Patrol's signature colours. She loves rescuing more than anything and her catchphrase is "Breakdown chugger coming through-oooooooo!" Her old model was reused and modified for Tai, who first appeared in the sixth series.	Nicole Davis	Phillipa Alexander
Chatsworth	A white, red, and gray diesel chugger who generally performs the same tasks as Harrison. He can overreact easily, for example, he thinks that if his horn or coupler are broken that he cannot drive. He also loves his spotless paint and hates getting dirty.	Andy Nyman	John Chancer
Mtambo	A yellow, camouflage, and brown Kenyan-accented African tourist chugger who works around the safari park, giving tours to visitors. His name means "engine" in Swahili.	David Gyasi	
Frostini	A yellow and brown Italian-accented ice cream chugger, popular with the children of Chuggington and seen by the trainees as very cool. He is normally seen handing out ice creams or at the factory working on a creation. He is quite proud of his accomplishments. In many episodes, he has the most emotions than any other chugger – mostly due to his stress at work at the Ice Cream Factory. His catchphrase is "Magnifico!".	Angelo Cola (speaking voice); Randy Crenshaw (singing voice)	
Action Chugger	A yellow and orange super jet-powered chugger who responds to emergencies after being informed that he is needed by a flashing red light on his nose. He can unfold parts of his sides into short wings, each with a jet motor under it and fly. After flying, he always lands on a railway track. Action Chugger's flight range extends at least as far as low Earth orbit. He normally resides in Chuggington.	Pax Baldwin	John Pohlhammer (first four series); Dave Berry (sixth series onwards)
Speedy McAllister	A large purple Yorkshire-accented, later Western-accented streamlined steam locomotive who is somewhat gruff and blunt in character but means well and is helpful to experienced chuggers and trainees alike. He prefers more industrial jobs as opposed to those with a high degree of customer relations. He mans the Rocky Ridge Quarry and Rocky Ridge Mine, along with the human: Karen. Speedy's whistle is the deepest of the four steam locomotives in Chuggington. His catchphrase is "A steam chugger never forgets!".	Warren Clarke	Stefan Ashton Frank
Skylar	A yellow rail crane who has just completed training. His crane ends in a two-fingered grab. He can use his crane and his side prop legs to flip himself end-for-end or onto an adjacent track. His model would be reused and repainted for Rosa, who appeared in the sixth series. His catchphrase is "It's crane time!".	Michael Quartey	Brendan Dooling (third series); Tony Denman (fourth series); Jason Durran (fifth series)
Decka	A double-decker transit engine built for heavy loads and passengers. She is brightly coloured and she has a big personality. She loves to incorporate her name into things. Her catchphrase is "Decka-lightful!".	Ninia Benjamin	
Jackman	The chief of Chug Patrol and the bravest chugger on the tracks. With a twinkle in his eye and strong leadership skills, Jackman makes the perfect leader for all four of the chug patrollers. His catchphrase is "I'm Chug Patrol and i'm ready to roll!".	Michael Byers	Original audio is retained (fourth and fifth series) Michael G Stern (sixth series)
Asher	A red firefighting chugger from Tootington who is the newest member of the rescue squad Chug Patrol. Strong, brave and reassuring, he takes care of the fires in Chuggington.	Marcel McCalla	
Zack	The leader of the Chuggineers. This foreman is organised, hardworking and extremely safety conscious, making him the perfect leader of the Chuggineer crew. Joined by his fellow team members Tyne, Brewster and Fletch, this engineering team is responsible for all the heavy lifting, loading and building of bridges, tunnels and stations as well as laying track and making repairs.	Paul Dodds	Stuart Milligan (fourth and fifth series); Mick Wingert (sixth series onwards)
Tyne	A member of the Chuggineers who loves to blow up unneeded buildings, she says that she is "proud to be loud". Tyne also shares a friendly rivalry with her peer, Fletch.	Carina Reeves	Jessica McDonald
Fletch	A member of the Chuggineers who is strong, and likes playing small jokes on other chuggers. Fletch also shares a friendly rivalry with his peer, Tyne.	Joe Sims	Earl Perkins
Hanzo	A white and blue bullet train who is the fastest chugger in Chuggington. Mentor to Koko, Hanzo is sleek, streamlined and has a photographic memory. He believes there is no greater honour than transporting passengers quickly, but always safely, to their destination. Respectful, dedicated and precise, Hanzo encourages fellow Speed Fleet chuggers to be the best they can through rigorous practice. He is always extremely punctual. He also has a calm peaceful tone when he speaks. Of all the characters, his horn is the loudest.	Dai Tabuchi	
Cormac	A viridian forklift chugger who works with Pete in the Drop Load and Freight Yard, the central distribution site for Chuggington. Besides working in the Drop and Load Yard, Cormac has many jobs around Chuggington. He loves driving around and having adventures! He sometimes assists the Chuggineers and Speedy.	Jez Edwards	Walter Lewis (fourth and fifth series); Tin Chase (sixth series onwards)
Payce	A tunnel runner from Tootington, Chuggington's neighbouring town. Like the speed fleet, Payce is faster than the speed of light. She is good friends with Koko, yet shares a small friendly rivalry with her.	Ruth Zielinski	Siu-see Hung
Daley	A high-speed courier chugger who reuses Payce's model.	Harry Lawtey	Nile Bullock
Skipper Stu	A blue diesel who works is in charge of everything at Chuggington Harbour.	James Goode	
Harry and Hamish	Twin orange and green diesels who work at Chuggington Harbour. In the sixth series, only Hamish appears.	Stephen Critchlow (Harry); Richard Ridings (Hamish)	
Russ	A yellow reach stacker chugger working at the Chuggington Harbour.	James Naylor	Jos Slovick
Rosa	A turquoise Spanish crane chugger from San Locomota. She is a member of the Chuggineers and reuses Skylar's model.	Tiana Camacho	

=== Ambiguous ===
Name	Description	Voiced by (UK)	Voiced by (US)
Vee	The head of the railway department and is the announcer, with speakers all over Chuggington, in the depot and in remote areas. She keeps everything running on time and to schedule. After giving the chuggers their tasks, her dispatch board shows the destination and shows which coloured tunnel to take when leaving the depot. She can be stern with disobedient chuggers. Vee has never been anything other than her public address system. She may be a human or a self-intelligent system similar to the chuggers.	Maria Darling (first five series); Jacqueline Davis (sixth series onwards)	Johnnie Flori (first five series); Julie Wions (sixth series onwards)

=== Humans ===
Name	Description	Voiced by (UK)	Voiced by (US)
Captain Charlie	The captain at Chuggington Harbour.	Stephen Critchlow	John Chancer
Dr. Gosling	The safari park vet.	Paul Panting	Mac McDonald
Dr. Ling	A scientist and researcher in Chuggington. She often develops various inventions for the chuggers to test out.	Meg Kubota	
Eddie	A young mechanic who turns his hand to all manner of tasks, including track maintenance and fixing signals and points. He currently lives in a caboose, similar in appearance to Morgan's house, close to Chuggington. He used to live with his parents some distance away and was frequently late to work, but the trainees found an abandoned caboose and Morgan fixed it so Eddie could live in it.	Sacha Dhawan	Trevor White (first five series); Nick Hagelin (sixth series)
Felix	The farmer in Chuggington.	Andy Nyman	Elisha Sessions
Karen	The manager who works at Rocky Ridge Quarry along with the steam engine Speedy McAllister.	Maria Darling	Lorelei King
Howie	The control person at the Working Wheels yard where chuggers get refueled/cleaned and their jobs for the day.	Steve Devereaux	Morgan Deare
Lori	An Irish brunette haired girl who works with Morgan at the Repair Shed and was also tasked with cleaning engines before the arrival of the ChugWash.	Maria Darling (first four series); Jacqueline Davis (sixth series onwards)	Barbara Barnes (first four series); Julie Phillips (sixth series onwards)
Mayor Pullman	The mayor of Chuggington.	Floella Benjamin	Lachele Carl (first five series); Carla Fisher (sixth series onwards)
Morgan	The chief engineer mechanic at the depot in charge of the Repair Shed. He lives in a house that looks like a caboose in Chuggington yard.	Paul Panting	Taylor Clarke-Hill (first five series); William Stern (sixth series)
Vicki	A zookeeper who looks after the animals.	Nicole Davis	Laila Pyne

== Production ==
The series' former logo.

The creative core behind Chuggington is Sarah Ball, a producer and director who worked on Bob the Builder, and Don Toht, who designed the characters and sets.

The animation is made with Autodesk Maya software.

As well as the regular ten-minute episodes, there are four-minute shows, Chuggington: Badge Quest, focusing on the trainees' efforts to earn reward badges for their "Chugger" training.

Three Chuggington specials were commissioned for release on DVD from 2013 onwards.

On 29 November 2017, Fuji Television took over the Japanese rights to the show (including production, distribution and licensing) in Japan from Ludorum.

On 10 December 2018, Herschend Entertainment Studios acquired the rights to the series.

== Broadcast ==
The first series of 52 episodes was sold to broadcasters including the BBC, ABC (Australia), TF1 (France), ⁣Super RTL (Germany), and Fuji TV (Japan) in a deal announced in February 2008. A second series of 26 episodes was purchased by the BBC and many other broadcasters throughout the world. Aimed at children between the ages of 3 and 6, Chuggington made its UK debut as a "soft launch" on BBC Two on 29 September 2008.

== Reception ==
Emily Ashby of Common Sense Media gave the show four stars out of five, saying that "Young 'trainees' teach preschoolers important social skills."

== Merchandise ==
In January 2009 it was announced that RC2 would be producing Chuggington toys under their Learning Curve brand; the toys were released to the market in 2010. RC2 contributed to half of the series' production budget in exchange for long-term global toy licensing rights.

=== Media ===
DVDs from Anchor Bay Entertainment include the first, entitled Chuggington: Let's Ride the Rails, was released in March 2009 containing six episodes. A second DVD, Action Stations, released in October 2009, contained another six. The third DVD release, Wheels to the Rails, with another eight episodes, released in November 2010. Anchor Bay's Chuggington: Let’s Ride the Rails! was the first Chuggington DVD to be released nationwide in the United States on 8 February 2011.

In the UK, several children's books have been released, including Koko on Call: A Nightlight Adventure, based on an early episode. Publications International and Scholastic introduced Chuggington books to the US market in late 2010 and early 2011, respectively.

=== Toys ===
In early 2010, the Chuggington Diecast Series of model trains was released in the UK. The Chuggington Diecast Series by Learning Curve was released in the US nationwide in late 2010. In 2012, the system was rebranded to StackTrack, in which children can stack the railway tracks on top of each other with supports. This system was discontinued by 2017, however the StackTrack track system is still in use.

Later in 2010, the interactive range was released in the UK. The chuggers and Vee, their dispatcher, can interact with each other using 'Smart Talk' technology and over 300 stored phrases. Each chugger can recognise the other chuggers, and their train stops. The interactive phrases spoken depend on which chuggers and locations are placed together, giving a more varied, but not random, conversation. The Chuggington Interactive Railway was released in the United States in February 2011. This system was discontinued by 2017 due to expired licensing agreements, which also applies to several other systems explained below.

The Chuggington Wooden Railway was released in September 2010 to Canada, and on 1 March 2011 to specialty retailers in the United States. It is compatible with all other wooden railway systems. This system was discontinued by 2017.

In late 2011, Mega Brands released the 'Chuggington Construction' range, but was discontinued, as of 2013.

In the United States, other Chuggington products include games (I Can Do That! Games), puzzles (Cardinal), and activity sets (Crayola).

In 2012, the Plarail Chuggington range was released and was discontinued around 2017.

In 2013, Bachmann Trains made a series of Chuggington electric train sets and separate sale engines and cars. It is compatible with all other HO scale systems by other companies and is made to work with the range based on another children's television show about trains, Thomas & Friends. In 2017, Bachmann Trains have discontinued the Chuggington range.

From 2016 to 2018, Jazwares produced their Chuggington range, consisting of "Little Chuggers" and the "Connectrax" system, which are compatible with Wooden Railway and other preschool toy trains systems.

In 2019, Alpha Group Co., Ltd. acquired the rights for any future Chuggington vehicle toys.

== Train and Tramway ==
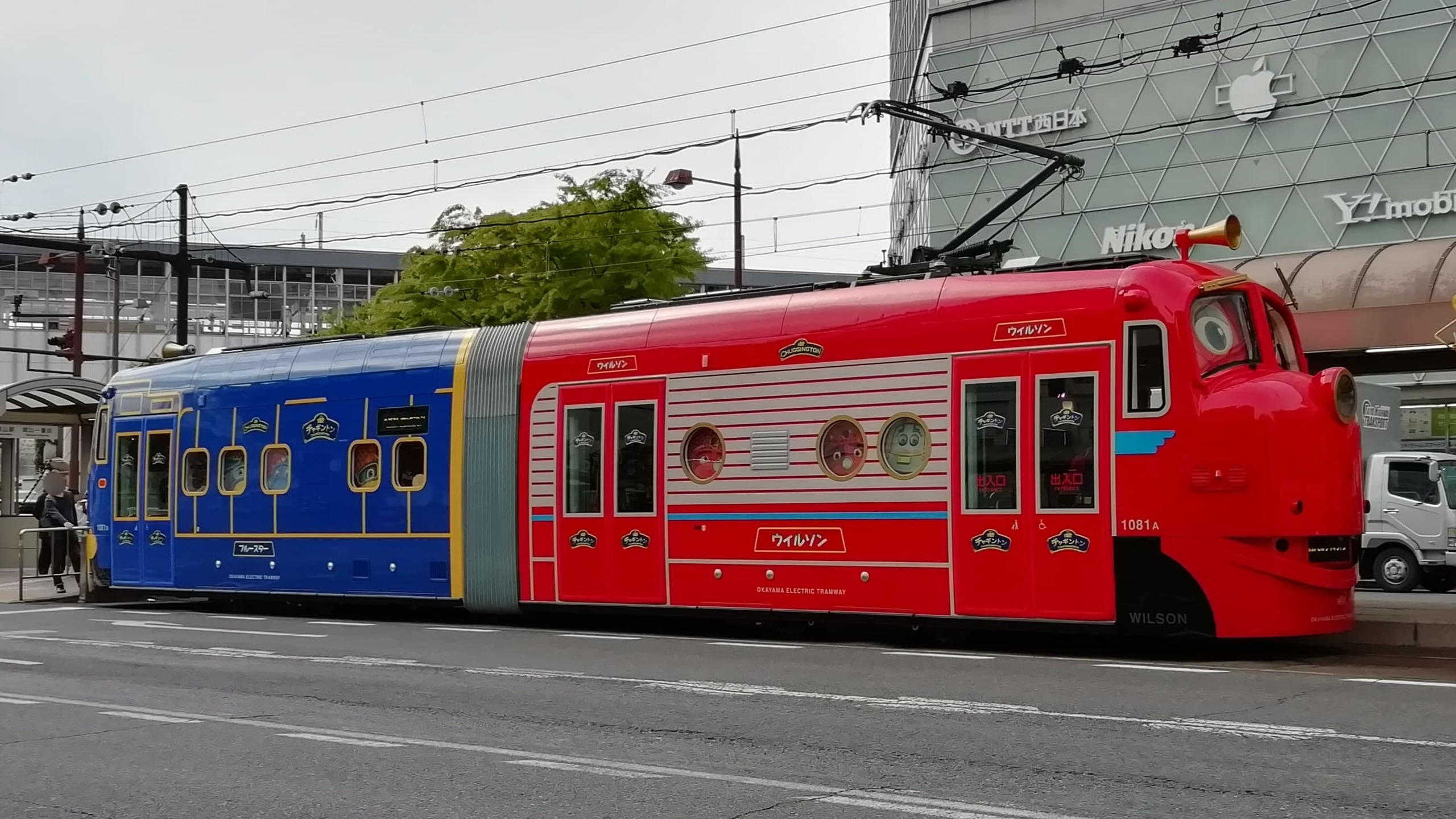
The body of Wilson and Brewster as a motif, in Okayama Tramway in Japan (2019)

According to Okayama Electric Tramway press report on 12 January 2018, it operated in 2 cars and 1 train with its own decorated appearance that reproduced Wilson and Brewster in Japan. With the all-seat reservation system, the operation started on 16 March 2019. It is confirmed as the world's first in the railroad and tram related motif with this character as a motif.

== See also ==
- Thomas & Friends
- Underground Ernie
