= Sunny Bunnies =

Animated children's television series

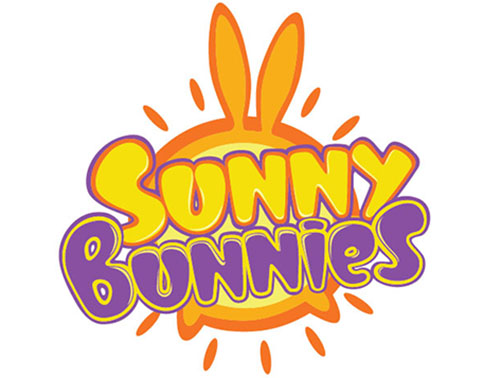
- English: Sunny Bunnies
- Genre: Preschool education Comedy; Slapstick; Fantasy
- Created by: Andrew Ledenev; Andrew Tolkachev; Sergey Gashnikov
- Written by: Andrew Ledenev; Andrew Tolkachev; Alexander Lenkin (seasons 1–3); Sergey Gashnikov (seasons 3–present); Daria Berdnikova (seasons 7–present)
- Directed by: Andrew Ledenev; Marina Karpova (seasons 3–present)
- Voices of: Svetlana Timokchina; Dmitri Davidovich; Lucy Capri
- Opening theme: "Sunny Bunnies"
- Ending theme: "Sunny Bunnies"
- Composers: Dmitry Friga; Victor Dementiev
- Countries of origin: Belarus (seasons 1–6); Poland (seasons 7–present); United Kingdom
- Original language: None (Note: The bunnies vocalize sounds, but there is no spoken language)
- No. of seasons: 10
- No. of episodes: 256 (list of episodes)

Production
- Executive producer: Sergey Gashnikov
- Animators: Vladimir Neofita; Alexander Yakovlev; Elena Pogerilo; Anton Melnikau; Kakha Gvaramia
- Editors: Alexander Krutel; Evenly Rogozin
- Running time: 3–4 minutes
- Production companies: Digital Light Animation Studios (seasons 1–6); Animation Café (seasons 7–present)

Original release
- Network: YouTube (part of season 2, seasons 3–present); Disney Channel (Russia); Channel 5 (United Kingdom)
- Release: 6 December 2015 – present

Sunny Bunnies (Russian: Солнечные зайчики, romanized: Solnechnye Zaychiki) is an animated comedy children's television series about the adventures of five colorful balls of light produced by Digital Light Studio (for its first six seasons) and Animation Café (season 7 onwards). The show currently consists of ten seasons, with 26 episodes each. The tenth season was launched on 26 December 2025, and is airing on YouTube, The Roku Channel, and Amazon Prime Video. Sunny Bunnies is broadcast in more than 160 countries internationally, and its official English-language YouTube channel launched in September 2015 with management support from DHX-owned online kidsnet WildBrain. Sunny Bunnies also currently streams on Yippee TV, a Christian-based American children's subscription video on-demand over-the-top streaming service, and on Netflix, Netflix Kids, and Peacock Premium Plus. The show's production was relocated following the Russian invasion of Ukraine.

== Plot ==
The Sunny Bunnies are a group of mischievous and friendly magical bunnies that spawn from the sun. In each episode, they appear in different locations, ranging from the local park and various other places throughout the world. During these endeavors, the characters end up at odds with each other and clash, which causes chaos and destruction, or play kids' games to amuse themselves. As opposed to most other oriented shows, Sunny Bunnies heavily utilizes absurdist humor and slapstick to drive its comedy. The series puts a heavy focus on the main five characters, including their personalities, their semi-dysfunctional relationship with one another, and their dynamics. At the end of each episode, several "bloopers" are featured, either showing something happening during the in-universe production of the episode itself, a clip from the episode itself, bloopers of scenes not shown in the episode, extensions of the episode, or something else entirely.

== Characters ==
=== Main ===
- Turbo (the orange bunny, voiced by Dmitri Davidovich) is the overprotective, short-tempered and occasionally arrogant designated leader of the other bunnies. He is caring, intelligent, and self-confident, but a little bossy and controlling. He is 5 years old.
- "Big" Boo (the pink bunny, voiced by Dmitri Davidovich) Also known as just "Boo", he is the oldest bunny at 6 years old. He is the largest bunny in the group, and loves ice cream (and food in general) to the point that in some episodes he is rarely seen without it. Sometimes he appears to be dim-witted, but he is actually smart and kind, although a bit clumsy and impulsive at times.
- Iris (the purple bunny, voiced by Svetlana Timokchina) is one of the most intelligent bunnies. She has a younger sister named Shiny, and they tend to do everything together. She always wears a large pink bow (with light pink dots) and does not like it when her bow gets lost or stolen. Iris also has a deep passion for magic and is well-versed in several magic spells, to varying results. She usually serves as the voice of reason against the chaotic behavior of the others and is 4 years old.
- Shiny (the light blue bunny, voiced by Svetlana Timokchina) is a kind-hearted and sensitive bunny who has a tendency to cry at whatever upsets her, even petty or unimportant things. She always wears a flower clip on her head. Shiny is sisters with Iris, and spends most of her time playing with her. She is also 4 years old. She is the only bunny to have hair resembling that of a human.
- Hopper (the green bunny, voiced by Svetlana Timokchina) is 2 years old. Despite his cute demeanor, he is the most mischievous, short-tempered, and impatient member, and part of the show's comedy is driven by his antics, practical jokes and the mayhem that he generates, especially in early episodes. He also has a problem with greed and letting his impulses dictate his actions, but ultimately has his friends' best interests at heart and will do the right thing.

=== Recurring ===
- The Big Gray Wolf (voiced by Dmitri Davidovich) is the main antagonist of seasons 2 and 3. Debuting in the episode of the same name, the wolf comes from the moon and formulates many plans to trap and eat the Bunnies, but always gets fooled or loses them, often in humiliating fashions.
- S-Marty (voiced by Dmitri Davidovich) is a new resident in Sunny Park, introduced in season 5. S-Marty is an orderly and punctual robot who keeps an eye on the bunnies and how tidy the places they roam (especially the park) are.
- Mimi the Frog (voiced by Svetlana Tsimokhina) is a frog that was introduced in season 9. The bunnies always want to play with her, but she wants to be left alone doing her own thing. She inflates her body when feeling uncomfortable.

== Episodes ==
Season	Episodes	Originally released	
Season	Episodes	First released	Last released
1	26	6 December 2015	
2	26	15 November 2016	22 June 2017
3	26	10 August 2017	16 November 2018
4	26	13 December 2018	17 December 2019
5	26	9 January 2020	24 December 2020
6	26	21 January 2021	3 February 2022
7	26	17 February 2022	13 November 2023
8	26	8 December 2023	22 November 2024
9	26	6 December 2024	12 December 2025
10	26	26 December 2025	present

== Production ==
=== Broadcasting ===
Sunny Bunnies is a Belarusian show about five colorful bunnies produced by Digital Light Studio. The show consists of ten seasons with 26 episodes each, with the ninth season currently airing on YouTube. The official English-language YouTube channel first launched in April 2016 with management support from the kidsnet WildBrain. The show is broadcast to over 160 countries, streaming on Yippee TV, Netflix, Netflix Kids, and Peacock Premium Plus. In the UK, the show airs daily on Milkshake!, Channel 5, Sky Kids, and on demand via Amazon Prime and other platforms. Following the acquisition of rights by Media I.M., it sold the second season of the series to Disney in 2017, allowing the show to be streamed on Disney Junior in several European countries.

=== Acquisition of rights by Media I.M. ===
After premiering on Disney Channel in Russia in December 2015, the show caught the attention of UK-based distributor Media I.M., which promptly acquired exclusive worldwide rights to TV, digital and VOD.

Since then, Media I.M. has appointed the California-based merchandise company Evolution to license and handle all promotional rights. As of 2017, Media I.M. is looking for licensing agents in Europe and Asia-Pacific.

In November 2017, Media I.M. signed a three-year distribution deal with Discovery Kids India for Sunny Bunnies. The agreement covers pay-TV, simulcast and catch-up rights for the first two seasons of Sunny Bunnies.

=== Deals ===
Media I.M. has signed several deals for Sunny Bunnies, including in Canada, India and Brazil.

In Canada, Canada's DHX Television started broadcasting the first two seasons of the show for its Family Jr. and Télémagino channels in 2018. It was launched in July of the same year on the French and English language networks. In India, Under a three-year deal, which covers pay-TV, simulcast, and catch-up rights, Discovery Kids has aired the first two seasons of the series since November 2017. In Brazil, Brazilian app PlayKids started broadcasting season 1 of the show in 2017. while the Brazilian pay-TV broadcaster GloboSat started broadcasting the first two seasons for its kids channel Gloobinho in 2018. Following the series' success in the region, Brazil's Vertical Licensing has signed on for a new exclusive licensing deal to release new toys, books and other products for Sunny Bunnies throughout 2019. The series has additionally been broadcast by Disney Junior in the US, EMEA and Japan. In Portugal, the series has broadcast by Canal Panda, and TF1 digital in France.

=== Relocation from Belarus to Poland ===
In 2022, the production of Sunny Bunnies relocated from Digital Light Studio in Minsk, Belarus, to the Warsaw-based independent studio Animation Café, which also acquired the Sunny Bunnies intellectual property rights for an undisclosed sum. Since 2022, Animation Café now serves as the show's sole owner and producer, though Media I.M. retains exclusive commercial rights for TV, digital platforms, and merchandise. The move followed Belarus' support of Russia's ongoing invasion of Ukraine.

Although retaining its name, Digital Light Studio now operates at a reduced scale in Warsaw since 2022. According to Animation Café director Andrzej Ledzianeu, "Instead of producing kids' animation, it now only provides select third-party audio-visual services to some of its existing clients". Ledzianeu cited the shift to Poland as strategic, enabling access to broader markets, EU funding mechanisms, a larger talent pool within the EU, and enhanced resources to elevate the show's production quality.

== Video games and merchandise ==
=== Sunny Bunnies: Magic Pop ===
In 17 October 2018, it was announced that an official Sunny Bunnies video game was in development by 9th Impact, a video game company which was selected to develop the game by Media I.M. On 16 November of the same year, "Sunny Bunnies: Magic Pop!" was globally launched on the iOS App Store and Google Play Store. According to Media I.M.'s brand licensing director Gavin Metcalfe, 9th Impact was chosen as the game development partner because they have a deep understanding of working with TV properties and their track record of making games from the TV show. The game is a puzzle where players tap three or more adjoining of the same color in order to make them magically "pop" and count towards achievement of the level objective. An episode of the TV series of the same name was released on the same day to promote the game. In the episode, the bunnies discover a digital game on a computer and start playing. Big Boo unwittingly knocks over the screen, crushing the others and transporting them inside the game itself. After lifting up the computer, he discovers how to play the game and complete the objective to "pop" his friends out of the game and back into reality, thus restoring things to normal.

=== Sunny Bunnies: Coloring Book ===
In early 2018 another game, an app entitled "Sunny Bunnies: Coloring Book" was launched on Google Play Store and on 3 May 2019, an updated version was released. The app is said to be committed to creating a safe and educational environment for children. The colorful images in the game have reportedly been said to enhance pattern recognition and develop creative problem solving skills.

=== Merchandise ===
The series has been licensed in the US by Evolution, and merchandise was announced for release at the New York Toy Fair 2018 by Funrise Toys, including light-up and bouncing plush toys, talking plush toys, large huggable plush toys and a "bunny blast cannon" playset alongside figurines.

== Reception ==
The show is rated for ages 3+, as it has no violence that contains harm, but does include collisions and slapstick comedy that are meant to be funny.

=== Awards and nominations ===
Year	Award	Category	Nominee(s)	Result	Ref.
2019	Jury Prize	Best Series	Sunny Bunnies	Nominated	
2019	Jury diploma	Best Series	Sunny Bunnies	Won	
