= List of Sunny Bunnies episodes =

Sunny Bunnies is an animated comedy children's television series about the adventures of five colorful balls of light, produced by Digital Light Studio (for its first six seasons) and Animation Café (season 7 onwards). The show currently consists of ten seasons and ongoing, with 26 episodes each.

The show centers around the antics of 5 colorful bunnies named Turbo, Big Boo, Iris, Shiny, and Hopper. The characters make sounds, but there is no dialogue, making the series easily translatable for international audiences.

== Series overview ==
Season	Episodes	Originally released	
Season	Episodes	First released	Last released
1	26	6 December 2015	
2	26	15 November 2016	22 June 2017
3	26	10 August 2017	16 November 2018
4	26	13 December 2018	17 December 2019
5	26	9 January 2020	24 December 2020
6	26	21 January 2021	3 February 2022
7	26	17 February 2022	13 November 2023
8	26	8 December 2023	22 November 2024
9	26	6 December 2024	12 December 2025
10	26	26 December 2025	present

== Episode list ==
=== Season 1 (2015) ===
No. overall	No. in season	Title	Directed by	Written by	Original release date
1	1	"Merry-Go-Round"	Andrew Ledenev	Andrew Ledenev, Alexander Lenkin and Andrew Tolkachev	6 December 2015
The Sunny Bunnies stumble upon an empty theme park and attempt to ride a merry-go-round. Their plans hit a roadblock when they realize it requires a coin to operate. After overcoming this hurdle, a new dilemma emerges: the ride now spins uncontrollably fast, leaving them scrambling to hop on.
2	2	"Magic Wand"	Andrew Ledenev	Andrew Ledenev, Alexander Lenkin and Andrew Tolkachev	6 December 2015
The Sunny Bunnies appear at a circus tent. Hopper discovers a magical wand there and uses it to transform his friends into random objects and animals. Chaos erupts as the group battles for control of the wand, culminating in disaster when Iris seizes it and unleashes unintended consequences.
3	3	"Concert"	Andrew Ledenev	Andrew Ledenev, Alexander Lenkin and Andrew Tolkachev	6 December 2015
Turbo organises a symphony in a concert hall (dubbed in the official descriptions as the "Bunny Sonata"). The symphony collapses when Hopper accidentally hits Shiny with his xylophone, sparking a retaliation from Shiny, drowning out the initial symphony in chaos instead.
4	4	"Who's Faster?"	Andrew Ledenev	Andrew Ledenev, Alexander Lenkin & Andrew Tolkachev	6 December 2015
The Sunny Bunnies find themselves in an athletics stadium for a sprint hurdles race. What begins as a competitive challenge quickly devolves into pandemonium as their antics turn the track into a playground of chaos.
5	5	"Bunnies on the Moon"	Andrew Ledenev	Andrew Ledenev, Alexander Lenkin & Andrew Tolkachev	6 December 2015
An unexpected solar eclipse interrupts the bunnies' outdoor games. Determined to solve the mystery, they fly to the moon and uncover a hidden secret buried deep within one of its craters.
6	6	"Magician's Case"	Andrew Ledenev	Andrew Ledenev, Alexander Lenkin & Andrew Tolkachev	6 December 2015
Back in the circus, Hopper accidentally locks himself in a magician's case, and to make his predicament worse, he is subjected to getting stabbed with swords by Turbo and chased by Shiny and Iris wielding a saw.
7	7	"Fireflies"	Andrew Ledenev	Andrew Ledenev, Alexander Lenkin & Andrew Tolkachev	6 December 2015
On a dark and misty night in Sunny Park, the bunnies spot a glowing firefly and trap it in a jar. Their triumph is short-lived, however, as a swarm of angry fireflies descends to rescue their captured companion.
8	8	"Athletics"	Andrew Ledenev	Andrew Ledenev, Alexander Lenkin & Andrew Tolkachev	6 December 2015
The Sunny Bunnies arrive at an athletics stadium to compete for a giant cake. They continuously hurl random objects to see who can throw the farthest.
9	9	"Hide and Seek"	Andrew Ledenev	Andrew Ledenev, Alexander Lenkin & Andrew Tolkachev	6 December 2015
The bunnies play hide-and-seek in a museum. Things go well until Iris gets chased by Boo towards a valuable statue and ends up breaking it. The characters then spend the remainder of the episode trying to repair it.
10	10	"Birthday"	Andrew Ledenev	Andrew Ledenev, Alexander Lenkin & Andrew Tolkachev	6 December 2015
On the day of Shiny's birthday, the other bunnies tie too many balloons to the upper rim of her seat, causing her to float into the sky and start crying. The bunnies cannot get Shiny down, so they gather other balloons to follow her.
11	11	"Who's There?"	Andrew Ledenev	Andrew Ledenev, Alexander Lenkin & Andrew Tolkachev	6 December 2015
The bunnies argue over each other to get some ice cream, leading them to find some magic doors that makes their chase to get ice cream a lot more hectic.
12	12	"Catch Me!"	Andrew Ledenev	Andrew Ledenev, Alexander Lenkin and Andrew Tolkachev	6 December 2015
While playing hide-and-seek in a circus, the bunnies discover a balloon that generates static electricity, which pesters and chases them wherever they go.
13	13	"Let's Go for a Ride!"	Andrew Ledenev	Andrew Ledenev, Alexander Lenkin and Andrew Tolkachev	6 December 2015
The bunnies all want to have a go on different rides at the theme park, but the problem is they only have one coin.
14	14	"Christmas Tree"	Andrew Ledenev	Andrew Ledenev, Alexander Lenkin & Andrew Tolkachev	6 December 2015
Winter is here and the bunnies find themselves in a snowy park, next to a tall Christmas tree. They quickly get to work to decorate the tree, unintentionally frustrating the examiner of the tree (Turbo) along the way.
15	15	"Knight Tournament"	Andrew Ledenev	Andrew Ledenev, Alexander Lenkin & Andrew Tolkachev	6 December 2015
The bunnies decide to play an old fashioned game of knights. The magic helmet that they find mentally transforms Boo into an angry and pugnacious knight. The others rush to rescue Turbo from his peril.
16	16	"Burning Desires"	Andrew Ledenev	Andrew Ledenev, Alexander Lenkin & Andrew Tolkachev	6 December 2015
The bunnies make a discovery in one of the flower beds in the park: a flower that makes wishes come true. Hopper uses its power to wish his friends away and play by himself, but ends up regretting it.
17	17	"How to Play Tennis"	Andrew Ledenev	Andrew Ledenev, Alexander Lenkin & Andrew Tolkachev	6 December 2015
The bunnies are eager to learn how to play tennis. They swing their rackets and hit the ball as hard as possible, but there is a problem: the ball does not land where they want it to. The judge (Turbo) gets hit most of the time, and when he cannot stand it anymore, he takes the sport into his own hands.
18	18	"Bubbles"	Andrew Ledenev	Andrew Ledenev, Alexander Lenkin & Andrew Tolkachev	6 December 2015
The bunnies find a bubble blower in the park and start blowing bubbles straight away, but Boo keeps sneezing because of them, so they tie a bandana onto his mouth to prevent his allergy from getting worse.
19	19	"Colour Mixer"	Andrew Ledenev	Andrew Ledenev, Alexander Lenkin & Andrew Tolkachev	6 December 2015
The bunnies go rollerblading in the park, but a strange-looking ride shaped like a flying saucer mixes up all of their plans and their colors.
20	20	"Wonder Brush"	Andrew Ledenev	Andrew Ledenev, Alexander Yakovlev & Andrew Tolkachev	6 December 2015
The bunnies appear inside the local art museum and get working on their own pieces right away. Hopper discovers a magical brush that can help him create a masterpiece, but he instead uses it to prank his friends and wreak havoc around the museum.
21	21	"Higher Than Anyone"	Andrew Ledenev	Andrew Ledenev, Alexander Lenkin & Andrew Tolkachev	6 December 2015
The bunnies are at the stadium and want to find out who is best at the high jump.. When it becomes too high for them, they realize they need a good amount of creativity and teamwork to complete the task.
22	22	"Juggler"	Andrew Ledenev	Andrew Ledenev, Alexander Lenkin & Andrew Tolkachev	6 December 2015
The bunnies are at the circus again. The episode focuses on Boo and his desire to learn how to juggle, with disastrous consequences.
23	23	"Selfie"	Andrew Ledenev	Andrew Ledenev, Alexander Lenkin & Andrew Tolkachev	6 December 2015
The bunnies find an unusual camera in the park. Every picture it takes gets transferred into the TV. When Boo, Iris, Shiny and Hopper take a picture and get stuck inside the television, Turbo tries to help them find a way out.
24	24	"Brave Pilot"	Andrew Ledenev	Andrew Ledenev, Alexander Lenkin & Andrew Tolkachev	6 December 2015
Boo dreams of becoming a famous pilot one day, and his friends are trying to help them as much as possible. Things do not go well and deteriorate even further when Turbo, Iris, Shiny, and Hopper get trapped upside down in a ferris wheel because of Boo's mistakes. Thus Boo is forced to fly and save them.
25	25	"Hocus-Pocus"	Andrew Ledenev	Andrew Ledenev, Alexander Lenkin & Andrew Tolkachev	6 December 2015
Appearing at the circus, Boo decides to put on a magic show performance for his friends, only to accidentally make them all disappear, so he tries to reverse the trick.
26	26	"Power of Magic"	Andrew Ledenev	Andrew Ledenev, Alexander Lenkin & Andrew Tolkachev	6 December 2015
At the circus, Hopper discovers his magic turban and uses it to lift everything and everyone in his sight. Turbo steals it and uses it to lift his friends. A frightening dilemma arises when he ends up putting them on a tightrope located over a board of sharp pins and must find a way to get them down, before he realizes that the batteries have died as well.

=== Season 2 (2016–17) ===
No. overall	No. in season	Title	Directed by	Written by	Original release date
27	1	"The Trick is in the Hat"	Andrew Ledenev	Andrew Ledenev, Alexander Lenkin & Andrew Tolkachev	15 November 2016
The bunnies are at a Wild West attraction in Sunny Park and hurry off to play some games, but Hopper stays behind to get a cowboy hat. The hat quickly proves to ruin Hopper's chances of succeeding, and only when he takes it off, he is able to complete bull riding.
28	2	"Golden Golf Club"	Andrew Ledenev	Andrew Ledenev, Alexander Lenkin & Andrew Tolkachev	24 November 2016
While the bunnies are playing golf, Turbo gets a yellow-colored golf club which seemingly has the special ability to help whoever's physically inept at playing golf succeed greatly. He gets good as time goes on and soon becomes a master at the sport. That is, until it eventually backfires.
29	3	"How to Make a Friend Laugh"	Andrew Ledenev	Andrew Ledenev, Alexander Lenkin & Andrew Tolkachev	1 December 2016
Shiny is having a bad day: her prized candy cane breaks and her favorite balloon pops. Her friends try to calm her down using a dandelion, magic shows and ice cream, but nothing works. Things get even worse as another balloon of hers flies away and gets encased in a tree, forcing the others to figure out a way to get it without risking getting themselves injured.
30	4	"Speedy Boots"	Andrew Ledenev	Andrew Ledenev, Alexander Lenkin & Andrew Tolkachev	8 December 2016
The bunnies find a pair of magic boots that can transport someone to wherever they desire. Boo puts them on, and is instantly sent speeding around the park at a lightning-fast pace. His friends make plans to get him to stop by using various hare-brained devices.
31	5	"Time Machine"	Andrew Ledenev	Andrew Ledenev, Alexander Lenkin & Andrew Tolkachev	15 December 2016
In a museum, Turbo discovers an ancient clock that can stop time, and uses it to prank his friends and wreak havoc throughout the museum's interior in various ways.
32	6	"Fluffy-Eared Team"	Andrew Ledenev	Andrew Ledenev, Alexander Lenkin & Andrew Tolkachev	20 December 2016
The bunnies spawn themselves onto a basketball court and attempt to score a basket, but it is not as easy as they think.
33	7	"Glutton"	Andrew Ledenev	Andrew Ledenev, Alexander Lenkin & Andrew Tolkachev	5 January 2017
Boo becomes extremely overweight, so the other Sunny Bunnies try their best to help him slim down.
34	8	"Elusive Cake"	Andrew Ledenev	Andrew Ledenev, Alexander Lenkin & Andrew Tolkachev	2 February 2017
The bunnies pay a visit to the park café to treat themselves to their favorite desserts, but chaos ensues when it turns out that everyone wants the exact same one.
35	9	"Magic Mirror"	Andrew Ledenev	Andrew Ledenev, Alexander Lenkin & Andrew Tolkachev	9 February 2017
Hopper is really bored playing on his own and discovers a magic mirror where twins resembling him reside. He tries playing with them, but when they start causing trouble, he gets help from the other bunnies.
36	10	"Football Team"	Andrew Ledenev	Andrew Ledenev, Alexander Lenkin & Andrew Tolkachev	16 February 2017
The bunnies want some ice cream but they do not have a plate for it. They decide to determine who gets it by playing a penalty shoot-out, with the winner being rewarded with a trophy to use with the ice cream.
37	11	"The Big Gray Wolf"	Andrew Ledenev	Andrew Ledenev, Alexander Lenkin & Andrew Tolkachev	23 February 2017
It turns out that the bunnies are not alone in the universe: on the moon lives a wolf who has been spying on the bunnies for a long time. Having loaded all of his hunting equipment and accessories into the spaceship, the Wolf flies to hunt, but it is more difficult than he anticipated.
38	12	"Magic Potion"	Andrew Ledenev	Andrew Ledenev, Alexander Lenkin & Andrew Tolkachev	2 March 2017
Shiny and Iris produce a magic potion and ask the others to taste-test it.
39	13	"Funfair Ride Trap"	Andrew Ledenev	Andrew Ledenev, Alexander Lenkin & Andrew Tolkachev	9 March 2017
The Wolf returns in an attempt trap to catch the bunnies. He plans to lure the bunnies onto their favorite carousel to eat them. The plan fails and his prey enjoy a ride on the carousel afterwards.
40	14	"Labyrinth"	Andrew Ledenev	Andrew Ledenev, Alexander Lenkin & Andrew Tolkachev	16 March 2017
The bunnies appear in a labyrinth where a beast, the Minotaur, lives, though it is actually just Big boo wearing a cow mask. The other bunnies think it is real and try to overcome various obstacles and avoid traps to escape.
41	15	"How to Cook Burger"	Andrew Ledenev	Andrew Ledenev, Alexander Lenkin & Andrew Tolkachev	23 March 2017
The Wolf develops a plan and invents a special device to make burgers from the bunnies, but the plan goes very awry.
42	16	"Strike"	Andrew Ledenev	Andrew Ledenev, Alexander Lenkin & Andrew Tolkachev	30 March 2017
The bunnies try bowling, where a piece of chewing gum becomes surprisingly useful in the competition.
43	17	"Little Imp"	Andrew Ledenev	Andrew Ledenev, Alexander Lenkin & Andrew Tolkachev	6 April 2017
The bunnies decide to play darts and the grand prize is a huge chocolate cake, but Hopper prevents the others from hitting the target to eat the cake for himself.
44	18	"Chickabunnies"	Andrew Ledenev	Andrew Ledenev, Alexander Lenkin & Andrew Tolkachev	13 April 2017
The bunnies do not want to let the wolf eat his morning breakfast. As a result, he takes revenge by loading his gun and shooting at the bunnies. The magic bullets turn them into eggs, and when they hatch, they annoy the wolf to get back at him.
45	19	"Level Up"	Andrew Ledenev	Andrew Ledenev, Alexander Lenkin & Andrew Tolkachev	20 April 2017
The bunnies play their favorite computer game and are ready to get to the next level when the wolf suddenly shows up. Their pursuit culminates with a broken computer, and the playground turns into a high-stakes computer game.
46	20	"Sweet Dream"	Andrew Ledenev	Andrew Ledenev & Andrew Tolkachev	27 April 2017
Boo is waiting for his friends to come so they can celebrate his birthday, but as they are running late, he falls asleep before the guests arrive. He then has a dream where he is in a land of sweets and gets pursued by a monster consisting entirely of ice cream.
47	21	"Ping-Pong Hero"	Andrew Ledenev	Andrew Ledenev & Andrew Tolkachev	11 May 2017
The bunnies are playing a game of ping-pong, with the exception of Hopper, who has no one to play with, so he draws a visual replica of himself on a chalkboard, which somehow manages to beat him at every turn.
48	22	"Incredible Machine"	Andrew Ledenev	Andrew Ledenev & Andrew Tolkachev	18 May 2017
Turbo and Big boo find themselves in the circus with a strange device in the middle of the arena. Turbo tries to figure out how it works, but chaos ensues after he presses all of the buttons in a row, and switches Boo's mindset into that of a cow, dog and horse.
49	23	"Magic Carpet"	Andrew Ledenev	Andrew Ledenev & Andrew Tolkachev	26 May 2017
There is a new ride in the amusement park called the Magic Carpet. The bunnies, excited at the sight, ride the roundabout. Boo, who was left without a seat, finds a real magic carpet that he uses to get back at his friends.
50	24	"Hard Nut to Crack"	Andrew Ledenev	Andrew Ledenev & Andrew Tolkachev	8 June 2017
There is a special attraction called the Hammer; whoever hits hardest on the anvil will receive a large nut. The bunnies try to crack it open, but are unsuccessful until Big boo helps out.
51	25	"Big Ice Cream for Little Bunny"	Andrew Ledenev	Andrew Ledenev, Alexander Lenkin & Andrew Tolkachev	13 June 2017
Hopper is faced with a difficult choice: to choose between a tiny ice cream cone where he is located or a huge one at the top of a mountain. He chooses the big one, but struggles to get to the mountain.
52	26	"Snapshot to Remember"	Andrew Ledenev	Andrew Ledenev & Andrew Tolkachev	22 June 2017
The bunnies arrive at a photo booth. Hopper is eager to take some pictures but is halted in his path and gets kicked out after trying to smuggle himself into the front. He retaliates by blowing his friends up with a firecracker and vandalizing the pictures with a black marker, humiliating them in the process.

=== Season 3 (2017–18) ===
No. overall	No. in season	Title	Directed by	Written by	Original release date
53	1	"Magic Eraser"	Andrew Ledenev	Andrew Ledenev, Alexander Lenkin & Andrew Tolkachev	10 August 2017
Iris gives out lessons on how to magically transform objects into other properties. While the other bunnies are busy, Hopper decides to use his newfound knowledge to cause trouble and erase his friends seemingly from existence. Iris figures out what is happening and forces him to give up the eraser and bring his friends back.
54	2	"Sunny Racers"	Andrew Ledenev	Andrew Ledenev, Alexander Lenkin & Andrew Tolkachev	14 September 2017
The bunnies decide to get out cars of their individual color and arrange a racing competition. The Wolf, who once again tries to catch the bunnies, becomes a participant in the race against his will.
55	3	"Piñata"	Andrew Ledenev	Andrew Ledenev, Alexander Lenkin & Andrew Tolkachev	28 September 2017
The bunnies appear in the midst of a Mexican carnival. The biggest attraction featured is a big colorful piñata filled with various kinds of sweets, so the bunnies try to break it to get the sweets. During the carnival, Turbo is set up as the brunt of the destruction, getting sent around at lightning speed through a collection of cacti and getting launched headfirst into the piñata.
56	4	"Boomerang"	Andrew Ledenev	Andrew Ledenev, Alexander Lenkin & Andrew Tolkachev	2 November 2017
Big Boo wants to play with his friends, but everything goes wrong: the racket does not work, and the rugby ball flies away. The other bunnies shun him for his awkwardness as a result. Boo finds a new toy with which he can keep himself entertained without his friends' involvement, until his friends want to play with it as well. Note: This is the last episode to be co-written by Alexander Lenkin before his departure from the series. All future episodes are instead co-written by Sergery Gashnikov.
57	5	"Donuts - Ninjas"	Andrew Ledenev	Andrew Ledenev, Sergey Gashnikov & Andrew Tolkachev	16 November 2017
Iris and Shiny decide to bake some donuts, but the boys, impatient, steal them ahead of time. Annoyed, and desiring to teach them a lesson, the duo decide to demonstrate their ninja skills and abilities. Note: This is the first episode to be co-written by Sergey Gashnikov following Lenkin's departure.
58	6	"Engineering Genius"	Andrew Ledenev	Andrew Ledenev, Sergey Gashnikov & Andrew Tolkachev	7 December 2017
While the bunnies are riding on their bicycles in the park, they discover a huge box containing a helicopter building kit. The bunnies then attempt to build a helicopter but repeatedly fail.
59	7	"Let's Go Get Those Presents!"	Andrew Ledenev	Andrew Ledenev, Sergey Gashnikov & Andrew Tolkachev	21 December 2017
It is Christmas and the bunnies are planning on celebrating. As the presents and the tree are in the middle of an ice rink, each bunny uses a different method to reach their prize: Hopper chooses to run as fast as he can, Iris and Shiny use skis to move around, Boo gets two boots and places them in front of each other repeatedly, and Turbo decides to use a wooden board for transportation, with a firework at the back.
60	8	"Now You See Me Now You Don't!"	Andrew Ledenev	Andrew Ledenev, Sergey Gashnikov & Andrew Tolkachev	18 January 2018
The bunnies appear in the circus arena again. Hopper finds an invisible hat and uses it to prank his friends in various ways, so the others team up to catch him.
61	9	"You Harvest What You Sow"	Andrew Ledenev	Andrew Ledenev, Sergey Gashnikov & Andrew Tolkachev	1 February 2018
The bunnies appear on a country farm, and find various seeds and decide to grow their own crops. Big Boo does not understand farming and thinks that it is possible to grow ice cream.
62	10	"Sunny Valentine's Day"	Andrew Ledenev	Andrew Ledenev, Sergey Gashnikov & Andrew Tolkachev	13 February 2018
The bunnies are getting ready for Valentine's Day and are decorating their snug clearing in the woods. Hopper acts lazy and reluctant to work until he discovers a magic wand that has the potential of helping him complete his task.
63	11	"Who's Stronger?"	Andrew Ledenev	Andrew Ledenev, Sergey Gashnikov & Andrew Tolkachev	1 March 2018
Boo and Hopper are on the sports ground and train to lift a heavy barbell to prove who is stronger.
64	12	"Bouncing Hero"	Andrew Ledenev	Andrew Ledenev, Sergey Gashnikov & Andrew Tolkachev	22 March 2018
The bunnies inflate an air mattress and bounce on it. Things go smoothly until Boo joins in and everything goes wrong.
65	13	"Sunny Easter Bunny"	Andrew Ledenev	Andrew Ledenev, Sergey Gashnikov & Andrew Tolkachev	29 March 2018
Easter is approaching, so the bunnies are busy painting their Easter eggs. Suddenly, a giant Easter egg appears that has Hopper inside. Desperate to paint it, the bunnies attempt to catch it in a high-speed chase.
66	14	"Perfect Game"	Andrew Ledenev	Andrew Ledenev, Sergey Gashnikov & Andrew Tolkachev	12 April 2018
Turbo appears at a baseball court. He wants to play but the court is empty. He discovers a mechanical pitcher and decides to play with it. The machine ends up going haywire though, forcing him to attempt to shut it off, which proves a difficult task.
67	15	"Sunny Skateboarding"	Andrew Ledenev	Andrew Ledenev, Sergey Gashnikov & Andrew Tolkachev	27 April 2018
It is Hopper's birthday and the bunnies give him a skateboard as a present. Meanwhile, Boo is conflicted on whether to stay behind and eat the cake or to go out and play with his friends.
68	16	"Bunny Doll"	Andrew Ledenev	Andrew Ledenev, Sergey Gashnikov & Andrew Tolkachev	17 May 2018
Iris and Shiny are spending their time dressing up their beloved doll. Meanwhile, the boys are testing a rocket and Hopper takes their doll for the test. When Shiny becomes heartbroken over the doll's disappearance, Hopper is mistaken for her doll and is unintentionally humiliated throughout the misunderstanding.
69	17	"Bunnies United"	Andrew Ledenev	Andrew Ledenev, Sergey Gashnikov & Andrew Tolkachev	7 June 2018
When the bunnies are going to play a table soccer game, they suddenly find themselves on a real football pitch.
70	18	"Sunlight! Camera! Action!"	Andrew Ledenev	Andrew Ledenev, Sergey Gashnikov & Andrew Tolkachev	28 June 2018
The bunnies decide to film a movie based on the Little Red Riding Hood fairy tale. However, the director (Turbo) is too demanding and short-tempered.
71	19	"We Are Off to the Beach!"	Andrew Ledenev	Andrew Ledenev, Sergey Gashnikov & Andrew Tolkachev	19 July 2018
Hopper's ball does not fit into any suitcase and he is forced to leave behind his favorite toy on the bunnies' outing to the beach. However, it turns out that this change is for the greater good.
72	20	"Bon Appetit"	Andrew Ledenev	Andrew Ledenev, Sergey Gashnikov & Andrew Tolkachev	2 August 2018
The bunnies arrive at a French-themed attraction. Each of the bunnies except Big Boo get a croissant. When Big Boo notices a giant croissant on top of a fake Eiffel Tower, he has to somehow get the croissant off.
73	21	"Fishy, Fishy, Fishy, Fish!"	Andrew Ledenev	Andrew Ledenev, Sergey Gashnikov & Andrew Tolkachev	23 August 2018
The bunnies appear in the water park. Turbo decides to catch some fish, the girls take up sunbathing, and Hopper and Big Boo inflate balloons. A leftover balloon that looks like a pufferfish gets progressively bigger and begins to terrorize the bunnies.
74	22	"The Unfortunate Magician"	Andrew Ledenev	Andrew Ledenev, Sergey Gashnikov & Andrew Tolkachev	13 September 2018
The bunnies find a magic wand that can turn any object alive in a souvenir shop. Hopper uses it to trap Turbo in a jack-in-the-box and turn Shiny and Iris into a butterfly and an elephant respectively. When the sisters violently crash into the shop, a toy jaw comes to life as a result and starts terrorizing the bunnies; the rest attempt to find a way to escape and potentially befriend the problematic piece of plastic.
75	23	"Dance Bunnies Dance!"	Andrew Ledenev	Andrew Ledenev, Sergey Gashnikov & Andrew Tolkachev	28 September 2018
The bunnies discover a virtual dance simulator that is apparently near-impossible to complete. They countinously fail trying to complete it until they decide to work together.
76	24	"The Grabber"	Andrew Ledenev	Andrew Ledenev, Sergey Gashnikov & Andrew Tolkachev	11 October 2018
The sunny bunnies are playing with a frisbee when it gets thrown over the bush area they are playing in. When Hopper gets sent off by Turbo to get it, he discovers an arcade machine and gets stuck in it. He begins to enjoy his time until Turbo abandons trying to help him. Realizing how boring his situation is, Hopper attempts to get the other bunnies' attention and therefore discover a way out.
77	25	"A Night Owl and a Lark"	Andrew Ledenev	Andrew Ledenev, Sergey Gashnikov & Andrew Tolkachev	25 October 2018
Hopper and Big Boo head over to Sunny Park early in the morning. Hopper wants to play and have fun, whilst Boo just wants to sleep.
78	26	"Magic Pop"	Andrew Ledenev & Marina Karpova	Andrew Ledenev, Sergey Gashnikov & Andrew Tolkachev	16 November 2018
The bunnies discover a video game called "magic pop" on the television screen, and only Big Boo cannot keep up with them and their fast pace. Because of his clumsiness, the bunnies are crushed by the TV and as a result, find themselves inside the game. Boo needs to win the game to bring his friends back into reality. Note: This episode is a promotion for the game of the same name. This also marks the first episode to be co-directed by Marina Karpova.

=== Season 4 (2018–19) ===
No. overall	No. in season	Title	Directed by	Written by	Original release date
79	1	"Save the Princess"	Andrew Ledenev & Marina Karpova	Andrew Ledenev, Sergey Gashnikov & Andrew Tolkachev	13 December 2018
Due to an absurd accident, Shiny finds herself high on the top of a castle. The rest of the bunnies try different ways to get to her, which nearly all end in failure. Eventually, Shiny is rescued, but then Iris is accidentally catapulted to the top of the tower by Big boo, and so the whole situation restarts itself.
80	2	"Jingle Bell Bunnies"	Andrew Ledenev & Marina Karpova	Andrew Ledenev, Sergey Gashnikov & Andrew Tolkachev	22 December 2018
Shiny, Big boo and Iris appear on a Christmas stage, while Turbo is the voice pitcher. The bunnies are working hard and Turbo is pleased with their work, but Hopper is bored. With the help of the voice pitching device, he disrupts the trio's performance, angering Turbo and creating chaos.
81	3	"Hopscotch Bunnies"	Andrew Ledenev & Marina Karpova	Andrew Ledenev, Sergey Gashnikov & Andrew Tolkachev	10 January 2019
Iris and Shiny are playing hopscotch when Big boo arrives, wanting to learn the game's rules. He ends up screwing up in his quest to learn.
82	4	"Showtime!"	Andrew Ledenev & Marina Karpova	Andrew Ledenev, Sergey Gashnikov & Andrew Tolkachev	24 January 2019
The bunnies gather around a television set to watch a screening of "Magic Wand". They cannot decide who is going to sit in the seat right in front of the screen and get into a fight. What they do not realize is that their squabble is being watched by their early character interpretations from the episode itself. Note: The episode is the first to implement a new intro sequence, specifically when the bunnies watch "Magic Wand". This intro would later be used in every episode starting with the beginning of Season 5.
83	5	"St. Valentine's Treasure"	Andrew Ledenev & Marina Karpova	Andrew Ledenev, Sergey Gashnikov & Andrew Tolkachev	15 February 2019
The bunnies discover a treasure map, with a red heart indicating the resting point of the treasure. Eager to discover it, they tear the map to pieces and set off to look for it individually with their pieces in hand.
84	6	"Kite and Bunnies"	Andrew Ledenev & Marina Karpova	Andrew Ledenev, Sergey Gashnikov & Andrew Tolkachev	28 February 2019
Hopper is racing around the park on his skateboard and getting in his friends' way when he discovers a kite that visually resembles him. Hopper teams up with the kite and they produce havoc.
85	7	"UFO: Unidentified Feeding Object"	Andrew Ledenev & Marina Karpova	Andrew Ledenev, Sergey Gashnikov & Andrew Tolkachev	14 March 2019
A UFO finds itself on Earth and continuously steals the bunnies' carrots. Wanting to discover what it needs them for, the bunnies become determined to expose the UFO and discover its secret.
86	8	"Snowman"	Andrew Ledenev & Marina Karpova	Andrew Ledenev, Sergey Gashnikov & Andrew Tolkachev	28 March 2019
The bunnies engage in a snowy battle during the winter season. They end up bringing a snowman to life and become fearful around it.
87	9	"Bunny Express"	Andrew Ledenev & Marina Karpova	Andrew Ledenev, Sergey Gashnikov & Andrew Tolkachev	11 April 2019
The bunnies are trying to decide who amongst them is the fastest driver and the most willing to win a prize relating to a competition.
88	10	"How to Fix the Rainbow"	Andrew Ledenev & Marina Karpova	Andrew Ledenev, Sergey Gashnikov & Andrew Tolkachev	25 April 2019
Turbo and Big boo break a rainbow while playing football. They attempt to fix it but are unsuccessful.
89	11	"Mr Know-it-All"	Andrew Ledenev & Marina Karpova	Andrew Ledenev, Sergey Gashnikov & Andrew Tolkachev	9 May 2019
The bunnies believe they know how to solve puzzles without touching any books, which give instructions on how to complete puzzles to begin with.
90	12	"Wildlife Lesson"	Andrew Ledenev & Marina Karpova	Andrew Ledenev, Sergey Gashnikov & Andrew Tolkachev	23 May 2019
The bunnies partake in a zoological lesson. Meanwhile, Hopper is inaccurately convinced that fish are capable of flying and living in the sky.
91	13	"Lazy Little Bunnies"	Andrew Ledenev & Marina Karpova	Andrew Ledenev, Sergey Gashnikov & Andrew Tolkachev	6 June 2019
While the girls are busy picking berries, Big Boo, Hopper and Turbo attempt to avoid doing any work by pretending to be sick. Shiny and Iris cook up a devilish plan of their own to trick them into working.
92	14	"How to Split an Orange"	Andrew Ledenev & Marina Karpova	Andrew Ledenev, Sergey Gashnikov & Andrew Tolkachev	20 June 2019
Big boo, Turbo and Hopper find a juicy orange but cannot decide on who will get to eat it.
93	15	"Twists and Turns"	Andrew Ledenev & Marina Karpova	Andrew Ledenev, Sergey Gashnikov & Andrew Tolkachev	4 July 2019
The bunnies go down an interchanging slide. The problem is that it takes just as much time to get to the top of the slide as it does getting to the bottom.
94	16	"How to Draw a Picture"	Andrew Ledenev & Marina Karpova	Andrew Ledenev, Sergey Gashnikov & Andrew Tolkachev	18 July 2019
The bunnies set off to draw some landscapes. Each bunny has its favorite color. But their paintings come out as simplistic and monochrome. To fix this, the friends work together to paint a colorful drawing together.
95	17	"Big "Bee" Boo"	Andrew Ledenev & Marina Karpova	Andrew Ledenev, Sergey Gashnikov & Andrew Tolkachev	1 August 2019
The bunnies want to eat some cookies with honey but discover that Big boo ate all of it, so he sets off to retrieve more for himself and his friends. When the bees refuse to give him honey, he decides to disguise himself as a bee to get some.
96	18	"Choo Choo Boo"	Andrew Ledenev & Marina Karpova	Andrew Ledenev, Sergey Gashnikov & Andrew Tolkachev	15 August 2019
While riding a carousel in the park, Big boo accidentally discovers an old steam train and decides to jump on, but things quickly begin to fall apart.
97	19	"Sunny Bunnies Cafe"	Andrew Ledenev & Marina Karpova	Andrew Ledenev, Sergey Gashnikov & Andrew Tolkachev	29 August 2019
There is a new café in the park and Turbo decides to try being a waiter, but the customers turn out to be troublesome.
98	20	"New Sports Boots"	Andrew Ledenev & Marina Karpova	Andrew Ledenev, Sergey Gashnikov & Andrew Tolkachev	19 September 2019
The bunnies are playing rugby when Turbo finds a pair of brand new rugby boots and now he's faced with a dilemma: whether to run around the muddy field with his friends or to keep his new boots nice and clean.
99	21	"Keep Fit Bunnies"	Andrew Ledenev & Marina Karpova	Andrew Ledenev, Sergey Gashnikov & Andrew Tolkachev	3 October 2019
The bunnies are doing their morning exercises. Turbo is insistent on inattentive Big boo joining in. Boo comes up with a plan how to trick his friends and have a peaceful rest.
100	22	"Cracking Fun"	Andrew Ledenev & Marina Karpova	Andrew Ledenev, Sergey Gashnikov & Andrew Tolkachev	18 October 2019
The bunnies find a plate of fruit. Everyone gets their fair share and Boo gets the coconut. The coconut there is particularly difficult to unearth, leading the bunnies to come up with many different ways to reach their goal.
101	23	"Spooky Bunnies"	Andrew Ledenev & Marina Karpova	Andrew Ledenev, Sergey Gashnikov & Andrew Tolkachev	31 October 2019
The bunnies are getting ready for Halloween. Hopper puts on a bat costume and is off to scare his friends. He attempts to be as scary as possible but his friends only think it is being played for comedy and laugh. Hopper does not give up though and finally finds a way to get his friends scared by getting a pumpkin costume.
102	24	"Sunny Harvest"	Andrew Ledenev & Marina Karpova	Andrew Ledenev, Sergey Gashnikov & Andrew Tolkachev	14 November 2018
The bunnies find a tall apple tree and decide to harvest the apples and collect them. However, the best-tasting apples are at the top of the tree and it is extremely difficult to reach them.
103	25	"Sunny Thanksgiving"	Andrew Ledenev & Marina Karpova	Andrew Ledenev, Sergey Gashnikov & Andrew Tolkachev	28 November 2019
The bunnies are trying to find a nice Thanksgiving table to display a hand-picked buffet of food on.
104	26	"Christmas Stockings"	Andrew Ledenev & Marina Karpova	Andrew Ledenev, Sergey Gashnikov & Andrew Tolkachev	17 December 2019
The Christmas season is back once again for the Sunny Bunnies. The stockings come alive and abscond from the tree, so Hopper tries to find them and put them back.

=== Season 5 (2020) ===
No. overall	No. in season	Title	Directed by	Written by	Original release date
105	1	"Freeze-styling"	Andrew Ledenev & Marina Karpova	Andrew Ledenev, Sergey Gashnikov & Andrew Tolkachev	9 January 2020
The winter season has arrived and the bunnies have to wear warm clothing on. But the boys are reluctant to wear clothes, and Shiny and Iris have to deal with the consequences.
106	2	"Sunny Circus Stars"	Andrew Ledenev & Marina Karpova	Andrew Ledenev, Sergey Gashnikov & Andrew Tolkachev	25 July 2019
The bunnies decide to try their hand at being circus performers. However, on the way to the show, looking forward to entertaining the crowd, their circus car breaks down but the train can carry the car to go to the circus.
107	3	"One-Bunny Band"	Andrew Ledenev & Marina Karpova	Andrew Ledenev, Sergey Gashnikov & Andrew Tolkachev	11 August 2019
The bunnies desire to play some musical instruments but Hopper wants to try all the instruments at once, so he starts stealing their instruments band.
108	4	"The Best Cook"	Andrew Ledenev & Marina Karpova	Andrew Ledenev, Sergey Gashnikov & Andrew Tolkachev	13 August 2019
The bunnies have a cooking competition to determine which of them is the best cook.
109	5	"Save the Watermelon"	Andrew Ledenev & Marina Karpova	Andrew Ledenev, Sergey Gashnikov & Andrew Tolkachev	14 August 2019
The bunnies decide to have a picnic, but Hopper steals and eats almost all of their food, except for a watermelon.
110	6	"Superbunny"	Andrew Ledenev & Marina Karpova	Andrew Ledenev, Sergey Gashnikov & Andrew Tolkachev	15 August 2019
A huge cloud in the sky is covering the whole park in its dull shadow. Only Hopper, characterized as a "Superbunny", can deal with something like this.
111	7	"Bunny Fools Day"	Andrew Ledenev & Marina Karpova	Andrew Ledenev, Sergey Gashnikov & Andrew Tolkachev	17 August 2019
The bunnies play jokes on each other on April Fools' Day.
112	8	"Chocolate Bunnies"	Andrew Ledenev & Marina Karpova	Andrew Ledenev, Sergey Gashnikov & Andrew Tolkachev	29 August 2019
Every year at Easter, the bunnies go to the park to get their favorite chocolate bunnies that resemble themselves. What they do not know though is that one of them is Big boo.
113	9	"Hello S-Marty!"	Andrew Ledenev & Marina Karpova	Andrew Ledenev, Sergey Gashnikov & Andrew Tolkachev	29 August 2019
There is a new inhabitant in Sunny Park: a multitasking robot called S-Marty, who is very tidy and punctual.
114	10	"Ready, Aim, Win!"	Andrew Ledenev & Marina Karpova	Andrew Ledenev, Sergey Gashnikov & Andrew Tolkachev	17 September 2019
Hopper and Big boo are aiming to hit a target with whatever they have, including balls, hoops and other various items, to get the prize: a bicycle.
115	11	"Sunny Stylists"	Andrew Ledenev & Marina Karpova	Andrew Ledenev, Sergey Gashnikov & Andrew Tolkachev	18 September 2019
Iris and Shiny are serious about becoming hair stylists but they constantly get interrupted by Big boo, Hopper and Turbo.
116	12	"Busy Bunny Day"	Andrew Ledenev & Marina Karpova	Andrew Ledenev, Sergey Gashnikov & Andrew Tolkachev	19 September 2019
The bunnies have a special clock which signals when it is time to play, study, eat and sleep. However, Hopper does not want to follow the routine.
117	13	"Selfie Mad!"	Andrew Ledenev & Marina Karpova	Andrew Ledenev, Sergey Gashnikov & Andrew Tolkachev	20 September 2019
Shiny is a big fan of taking selfies. However, she does not realize that taking all these pictures can become dangerous.
118	14	"Time to Relax"	Andrew Ledenev & Marina Karpova	Andrew Ledenev, Sergey Gashnikov & Andrew Tolkachev	20 September 2019
Iris and Shiny are bringing all they need for relaxation time in one go, but Hopper does not think ahead and keeps running there and back to get various items, leaving him no energy left to relax.
119	15	"Book of Dreams"	Andrew Ledenev & Marina Karpova	Andrew Ledenev, Sergey Gashnikov & Andrew Tolkachev	21 September 2019
The bunnies discover a magical book which can give them whatever they desire. They open the book and a football magically jumps out of it. As they all want the book, the bunnies argue over it.
120	16	"Tree House"	Andrew Ledenev & Marina Karpova	Andrew Ledenev, Sergey Gashnikov & Andrew Tolkachev	27 September 2019
The bunnies discover a treehouse in the forest, and attempt to get inside with diminishing results. Big boo is not interested in that and instead chases a butterfly, which proves to be the key to get inside.
121	17	"Tidying up is Fun"	Andrew Ledenev & Marina Karpova	Andrew Ledenev, Sergey Gashnikov & Andrew Tolkachev	27 October 2019
The bunnies love to play but dislike tidying up. But they have the robot S-Marty as their friend to clean whatever mess they possess or spread. He explains to the bunnies that tidying up can be fun.
122	18	"Who's in the Cave?"	Andrew Ledenev & Marina Karpova	Andrew Ledenev, Sergey Gashnikov & Andrew Tolkachev	15 November 2019
A mysterious echo is coming from the cave and stealing all their crops, and the bunnies want to find out who or what inhabits it.
123	19	"Turbo's Birthday"	Andrew Ledenev & Marina Karpova	Andrew Ledenev, Sergey Gashnikov & Andrew Tolkachev	14 December 2019
The bunnies are getting ready to celebrate Turbo's birthday. However, the celebration does not go as planned.
124	20	"Peaсe and Quiet"	Andrew Ledenev & Marina Karpova	Andrew Ledenev, Sergey Gashnikov & Andrew Tolkachev	18 December 2019
Turbo is attempting to meditate but his friends are bothering him and making noise, so he retaliates by using a magic wand.
125	21	"Trick or Treat"	Andrew Ledenev & Marina Karpova	Andrew Ledenev, Sergey Gashnikov & Andrew Tolkachev	31 December 2019
Halloween is about to arrive. While S-Marty is busy baking cookies, the bunnies are dressing up in scary costumes to scare S-marty and steal the cookies.
126	22	"Hats off to Frisbee"	Andrew Ledenev & Marina Karpova	Andrew Ledenev, Sergey Gashnikov & Andrew Tolkachev	9 January 2020
It is very sunny outside and the bunnies are busy doing their own things. The girls are assembling a puzzle, Big boo is painting a picture, Turbo is playing guitar, and Hopper is trying to coerce his friends into playing a game of frisbee.
127	23	"Monster Popcorn"	Andrew Ledenev & Marina Karpova	Andrew Ledenev, Sergey Gashnikov & Andrew Tolkachev	19 March 2020
The popcorn machine has run out of corn, so the bunnies decide to grow their own huge corn.
128	24	"Beware of the Dinosaur"	Andrew Ledenev & Marina Karpova	Andrew Ledenev, Sergey Gashnikov & Andrew Tolkachev	9 May 2020
The bunnies are at the Natural History Museum. The museum's caretaker, robot S-Marty, asks the visitors to exhibit responsible conduct, but they find it difficult to stop playing, and end up in a sticky situation.
129	25	"Sunny Bunnies Coloring Book"	Andrew Ledenev & Marina Karpova	Andrew Ledenev, Sergey Gashnikov & Andrew Tolkachev	15 August 2020
The bunnies' coloring book doodles come alive via a magic pencil, which ends up culminating in a sentient book that traps the bunnies inside.
130	26	"Fruity Fun"	Andrew Ledenev & Marina Karpova	Andrew Ledenev, Sergey Gashnikov & Andrew Tolkachev	24 December 2020
The bunnies' colors get lost because of one of Hopper's pranks making them multicolored first via magic gumballs, and then getting accidentally washed by robot S-marty.

=== Season 6 (2021–22) ===
No. overall	No. in season	Title	Directed by	Written by	Original release date
131	1	"Fun Ski Jumping"	Andrew Ledenev & Marina Karpova	Andrew Ledenev, Sergey Gashnikov & Andrew Tolkachev	21 January 2021
The bunnies have discovered a new hobby: ski-jumping. The group are having a lot of fun in contrast to their robot friend S-Marty, who is rather reluctant to partake in the sport. He learns to conquer his fear after helping the bunnies get out of a large snowdrift.
132	2	"Little Detectives"	Andrew Ledenev & Marina Karpova	Andrew Ledenev, Sergey Gashnikov & Andrew Tolkachev	21 August 2020
Iris has lost her beloved pink bow. To solve the mystery of where she presumably misplaced it, Turbo becomes a detective.
133	3	"Valentine Party"	Andrew Ledenev & Marina Karpova	Andrew Ledenev, Sergey Gashnikov & Andrew Tolkachev	29 August 2020
The bunnies are getting the park ready for Valentine's Day. They are hanging and sticking paper hearts everywhere. But S-Marty, who looks after the park and keeps it tidy, does not understand the purpose of these decorations but he later learns the concept of having these decorations.
134	4	"Little Ones Are Not Allowed"	Andrew Ledenev & Marina Karpova	Andrew Ledenev, Sergey Gashnikov & Andrew Tolkachev	14 September 2020
It turns out there is a ride in the park hidden in a distant corner. Hopper, being the youngest and the smallest out of the bunnies, is not allowed on it by S-marty. Hopper does not give up and eventually finds a safe way to go on the ride.
135	5	"Brand New Game"	Andrew Ledenev & Marina Karpova	Andrew Ledenev, Sergey Gashnikov & Andrew Tolkachev	29 September 2020
Iris and Shiny are determined to capture a butterfly that is not keen on having its picture taken by them.
136	6	"Twinkle, Twinkle, Little Star"	Andrew Ledenev & Marina Karpova	Andrew Ledenev, Sergey Gashnikov & Andrew Tolkachev	31 October 2020
Big Boo and Turbo find a fallen star, which Boo wants to eat while Turbo tries to figure out how to put it back in the sky.
137	7	"The Most Nimble"	Andrew Ledenev & Marina Karpova	Andrew Ledenev, Sergey Gashnikov & Andrew Tolkachev	25 December 2020
The bunnies compete against each other overcoming a difficult obstacle course, whilst S-Marty anxiously views the results.
138	8	"Boo's Super Scooter"	Andrew Ledenev & Marina Karpova	Andrew Ledenev, Sergey Gashnikov & Andrew Tolkachev	4 March 2021
The bunnies enjoy rollerblading and skateboarding. Big Boo finds a futuristic scooter online to do the same, but he does not know how to ride it.
139	9	"Little Builders"	Andrew Ledenev & Marina Karpova	Andrew Ledenev, Sergey Gashnikov & Andrew Tolkachev	19 April 2021
Iris and Shiny made a cool house made of balloons, but they are upset when Big Boo ruins it.
140	10	"Modern Art"	Andrew Ledenev & Marina Karpova	Andrew Ledenev, Sergey Gashnikov & Andrew Tolkachev	4 May 2021
The museum has gotten a major overhaul, and S-Marty's been put in charge of supervising and monitoring the paintings. But the bunnies do not behave and end up accidentally wrecking one of the paintings hung up on the walls, and attempt to hide the evidence from the then-unaware S-Marty.
141	11	"The Tale of the Carrot"	Andrew Ledenev & Marina Karpova	Andrew Ledenev, Sergey Gashnikov & Andrew Tolkachev	9 May 2021
The bunnies have grown large crops on the farm and try to find out who has the biggest vegetable. Hopper has only grown a small carrot, but still attempts to win the contest by cheating.
142	12	"Boo the Genie"	Andrew Ledenev & Marina Karpova	Andrew Ledenev, Sergey Gashnikov & Andrew Tolkachev	12 May 2021
Hopper and Turbo discover an old lamp and accidentally rub it. When the clouds of smoke fade away, the furry companions discover the genie is Big Boo. The remainder of the episode follows them as they make their wishes and the ways Boo messes them up.
143	13	"Sunny Bunnies Tractor Band"	Andrew Ledenev & Marina Karpova	Andrew Ledenev, Sergey Gashnikov & Andrew Tolkachev	18 June 2021
The bunnies decide to host another concert, this time in the form of a tractor band.
144	14	"Music for All"	Andrew Ledenev & Marina Karpova	Andrew Ledenev, Sergey Gashnikov & Andrew Tolkachev	24 June 2021
The bunnies love to play sports with music playing. Iris and Shiny prefer a calm melody for their yoga practice, Big boo loves to exercise to a fast dance rhythm, and Hopper and Turbo want to play badminton while listening to country music. They end up getting into a dispute over which music is the best, before settling the argument by playing their favorite song.
145	15	"Iris's Birthday"	Andrew Ledenev & Marina Karpova	Andrew Ledenev, Sergey Gashnikov & Andrew Tolkachev	15 July 2021
It is Iris' birthday she is waiting for her friends to arrive. However, the cake is running away from them, forcing the bunnies to try to catch the speedy delight and figure out what is going on.
146	16	"The Last Puzzle"	Andrew Ledenev & Marina Karpova	Andrew Ledenev, Sergey Gashnikov & Andrew Tolkachev	24 July 2021
Iris and Shiny are masters at solving puzzles in a rapid fashion. They come up with a solution when the last piece is missing.
147	17	"Magnificent Magnet"	Andrew Ledenev & Marina Karpova	Andrew Ledenev, Sergey Gashnikov & Andrew Tolkachev	5 August 2021
Hopper gets his beloved coin under a fountain, but Turbo finds a magnet and attracts all the metal things under. He finds so many things that it becomes hard to find the coin among them.
148	18	"Cool Superpower"	Andrew Ledenev & Marina Karpova	Andrew Ledenev, Sergey Gashnikov & Andrew Tolkachev	18 August 2021
Shiny has accidentally gained a superpower that has the special ability to freeze everything around her. With this superpower she can make fruit ice from juice, ice cream from milk, and an ice rink from a pool.
149	19	"Magical Flute"	Andrew Ledenev & Marina Karpova	Andrew Ledenev, Sergey Gashnikov & Andrew Tolkachev	29 August 2021
Hopper discovers a magical flute that can make others bend to his will. He uses this device to torment the other bunnies by forcing them against their will to dance alongside himself.
150	20	"The Halloween Fairy"	Andrew Ledenev & Marina Karpova	Andrew Ledenev, Sergey Gashnikov & Andrew Tolkachev	25 September 2021
The bunnies are going to a Halloween party, but Boo's clumsiness ends up knocking over all the fruit baskets, so he calls over his magic fairy godmother to help him clean up the mess.
151	21	"Gummy Boo"	Andrew Ledenev & Marina Karpova	Andrew Ledenev, Sergey Gashnikov & Andrew Tolkachev	16 October 2021
Big boo finds a gumball which causes whoever eats it to be able to move around Sunny Park like a spider with the help of bubble gum.
152	22	"Magic Lab"	Andrew Ledenev & Marina Karpova	Andrew Ledenev, Sergey Gashnikov & Andrew Tolkachev	17 October 2021
Iris is a tireless inventor of magic spells, consistently creating new powders and potions in her magical lab. Hopper and Boo do not share the same skills and find ways to stir up trouble, culminating in a complete mess.
153	23	"Cosmic Christmas Tree"	Andrew Ledenev & Marina Karpova	Andrew Ledenev, Sergey Gashnikov & Andrew Tolkachev	30 October 2021
The bunnies encounter a multi-colored, extravagant Christmas tree with numerous features.
154	24	"Mummy Bunny"	Andrew Ledenev & Marina Karpova	Andrew Ledenev, Sergey Gashnikov & Andrew Tolkachev	13 November 2021
There is a century-old sarcophagus in an ancient museum. The resting corpse of an old mummified person lies in the sarcophagus. Whoever wears the mummy's outfit has the power to pass through walls. Hopper seizes this opportunity by stealing the mummy's outfit and terrorizes his friends wearing it. He later finds that the costume's power to pass through walls comes in handy when he has to help his friends when they get locked behind a door.
155	25	"Dizzy Little Bunny"	Andrew Ledenev & Marina Karpova	Andrew Ledenev, Sergey Gashnikov & Andrew Tolkachev	31 January 2022
Hopper dismisses the fact that he could possibly get dizzy from riding the merry-go-round for too long and ends up paying the consequences.
156	26	"Sunny Bunnies Magic Mask"	Andrew Ledenev & Marina Karpova	Andrew Ledenev, Sergey Gashnikov & Andrew Tolkachev	3 February 2022
A magic mask is found can visually transform anything and anyone into one of the Sunny Bunnies, specifically, S-Marty.

=== Season 7 (2022–23) ===
Due to the Russian invasion of Ukraine, as of this season, the series' studio has been relocated from Belarus to Poland.

No. overall	No. in season	Title	Directed by	Written by	Original release date
157	1	"Mini Sunny Bunnies"	Andrew Ledenev & Marina Karpova	Andrew Ledenev, Sergey Gashnikov & Andrew Tolkachev	17 February 2022
Big Boo and Turbo are building a castle made of small blocks, but Hopper finds a magic size and accidentally shrinks his friends and himself.
158	2	"Fruity Rainbow"	Andrew Ledenev & Marina Karpova	Andrew Ledenev, Sergey Gashnikov & Andrew Tolkachev	3 March 2022
S-Marty has got lots of fresh fruit. The Sunny Bunnies have fun sorting them by colours and sending them to a magical factory that makes colourful fruit cocktails and a big rainbow.
159	3	"Bingo!"	Andrew Ledenev & Marina Karpova	Andrew Ledenev, Sergey Gashnikov & Andrew Tolkachev	17 March 2022
The Sunny Bunnies are going to play a game called 'Lotto'. S-Marty has prepared some prizes and has poured the coloured balls into the drum. However, Hopper has replaced all the balls with his green ones, so he is winning all the prizes.
160	4	"What a Colorful World!"	Andrew Ledenev & Marina Karpova	Andrew Ledenev, Sergey Gashnikov & Andrew Tolkachev	31 March 2022
Turbo and Iris find a box of magic pencils. During a competition on who colours the most objects, the whole park is subsequently painted in just two colours: orange and purple.
161	5	"Jenga"	Andrew Ledenev & Marina Karpova	Andrew Ledenev, Sergey Gashnikov & Andrew Tolkachev	14 April 2022
the Bunnies discover some new attractions in the park. They find goodies on high towers made of cubes have to play Jenga to get them.
162	6	"Fly Me to the Moon"	Andrew Ledenev & Marina Karpova	Andrew Ledenev, Sergey Gashnikov & Andrew Tolkachev	28 April 2022
Hopper gets thrown to the Moon while riding space carousels with his buddies, and the others try to rescue him.
163	7	"Hopper's Drone"	Andrew Ledenev & Marina Karpova	Andrew Ledenev, Sergey Gashnikov, Andrew Tolkachev & Daria Berdnikova	19 May 2022
Hopper flies his remote-controlled drone, which blows all the leaves everywhere.
164	8	"Green Ball Only"	Andrew Ledenev & Marina Karpova	Andrew Ledenev, Sergey Gashnikov, Andrew Tolkachev & Daria Berdnikova	16 June 2022
The sisters and Turbo are supposed to be in a swimming pool, but it does not have any water. Hopper accidentally tampers a vending machine with balls and they fly everywhere. When all the bunnies manage to stop the barrage of balls, they see that the empty swimming pool is filled with balls.
165	9	"Power of Electricity"	Andrew Ledenev & Marina Karpova	Andrew Ledenev, Sergey Gashnikov, Andrew Tolkachev & Daria Berdnikova	30 June 2022
Sunny Bunnies love growing vegetables but they need a big tractor to deliver them.
166	10	"Keep Clean and Enjoy"	Andrew Ledenev & Marina Karpova	Andrew Ledenev, Sergey Gashnikov, Andrew Tolkachev & Daria Berdnikova	21 July 2022
The bunnies like to eat bananas, but they must remember to throw away the banana peels in the bin, which Big boo does not understand.
167	11	"Vacuum Cleaner Detective"	Andrew Ledenev & Marina Karpova	Andrew Ledenev, Sergey Gashnikov, Andrew Tolkachev & Daria Berdnikova	8 September 2022
Sunny Bunnies are having a party and Big Boo, instead of helping his friends, runs into the forest with a box of chocolates and gets lost, so he tries to get back to the party.
168	12	"How to Print a Bike"	Andrew Ledenev & Marina Karpova	Andrew Ledenev, Sergey Gashnikov, Andrew Tolkachev & Daria Berdnikova	29 September 2022
Hopper has discovered a miracle machine that can print any toy by drawing on the screen, but he is not good at drawing.
169	13	"Sunny Unicorns"	Andrew Ledenev & Marina Karpova	Andrew Ledenev, Sergey Gashnikov, Andrew Tolkachev & Daria Berdnikova	3 November 2022
The Sunny Bunnies want to be unicorns, so they grow their own horns with the help of magic.
170	14	"I Don't Want to Be a Donkey!"	Andrew Ledenev & Marina Karpova	Andrew Ledenev, Sergey Gashnikov, Andrew Tolkachev & Daria Berdnikova	24 November 2022
S-marty is preparing a photoshoot and sets up a bunch of cardboard cutouts for the bunnies: two princesses for Iris and Shiny each, a fat pirate for Boo, a knight for Turbo and a donkey for Hopper. However, Hopper hates being a donkey.
171	15	"Magic Dandelions"	Andrew Ledenev & Marina Karpova	Andrew Ledenev, Sergey Gashnikov, Andrew Tolkachev & Daria Berdnikova	16 December 2022
Iris and Shiny are flying on brooms, and the other bunnies also want to. Boo accidentally breaks the brooms so they have to create a new one with the power of the dandelions.
172	16	"Super Boo Game"	Andrew Ledenev & Marina Karpova	Andrew Ledenev, Sergey Gashnikov, Andrew Tolkachev & Daria Berdnikova	3 February 2023
The bunnies are harvesting some raspberries to make some jelly, but Big Boo wants to play his favourite platformer game. The rest of the bunnies try to prevent Boo from playing but end up getting him Boo stuck inside that game.
173	17	"Being a Parrot"	Andrew Ledenev & Marina Karpova	Andrew Ledenev, Sergey Gashnikov, Andrew Tolkachev & Daria Berdnikova	3 March 2023
Iris and Shiny are feeding a parrot fruits, but Big Boo wants all the fruits for himself, so he kicks out the parrot out of its cage and tries to disguise himself as a parrot so the sisters will feed him instead.
174	18	"Jumping Tent"	Andrew Ledenev & Marina Karpova	Andrew Ledenev, Sergey Gashnikov, Andrew Tolkachev & Daria Berdnikova	14 April 2023
Big Boo and Hopper are out camping and Hopper does not know how to make a tent, so he orders a tent for himself, only for Big Boo to mess with it and accidentally turn it into a makeshift trampoline.
175	19	"Spoon-Out"	Andrew Ledenev & Marina Karpova	Andrew Ledenev, Sergey Gashnikov, Andrew Tolkachev & Daria Berdnikova	16 June 2023
Big Boo wants to eat some ice cream but is too lazy to get more for himself, so he secretly steals Iris' magic wand to make spoons give ice cream to him automatically: however, the spoons still want to feed him even after he is completely full.
176	20	"Live Pencil Sharpener"	Andrew Ledenev & Marina Karpova	Andrew Ledenev, Sergey Gashnikov, Andrew Tolkachev & Daria Berdnikova	28 July 2023
Hopper tries to draw an apple, but the toy jaw returns to eat more wood, including Hopper's paintbrush.
177	21	"The Proper Propeller"	Andrew Ledenev & Marina Karpova	Andrew Ledenev, Sergey Gashnikov, Andrew Tolkachev & Daria Berdnikova	15 September 2023
Boo wants to fly his paper airplane but there is no wind, so he steals Iris and Shiny's fan and cranks it is power beyond what is possible, which has disastrous consequences.
178	22	"Long Eared Basketball Star"	Andrew Ledenev & Marina Karpova	Andrew Ledenev, Sergey Gashnikov, Andrew Tolkachev & Daria Berdnikova	6 October 2023
The bunnies are playing basketball, but Hopper gets his ears and later legs stretched to become very long.
179	23	"Annoying Drummer"	Andrew Ledenev & Marina Karpova	Andrew Ledenev, Sergey Gashnikov, Andrew Tolkachev & Daria Berdnikova	27 October 2023
The Sunny Bunnies are cooking some strawberry cookies, but Hopper does not wanted to work and thus tries to drum, annoying everyone else.
180	24	"Magic Bubbles"	Andrew Ledenev & Marina Karpova	Andrew Ledenev, Sergey Gashnikov, Andrew Tolkachev & Daria Berdnikova	10 November 2023
Hopper and Turbo are blowing bubbles but they run out of the bubble-producing liquid. Iris gets a tub full of that liquid with some magic too to make the bubbles more lovely, bht Big Boo falls into the tub and gets an effect similar to the Midas Touch but with bubbles.
181	25	"Unbridled Bicycle"	Andrew Ledenev & Marina Karpova	Andrew Ledenev, Sergey Gashnikov, Andrew Tolkachev & Daria Berdnikova	17 November 2023
Hopper does not know how to ride a bicycle, so he orders one.
182	26	"Chocolate or Strawberry"	Andrew Ledenev & Marina Karpova	Andrew Ledenev, Sergey Gashnikov, Andrew Tolkachev & Daria Berdnikova	24 November 2023
Big Boo and Hopper have open the ice cream shops of strawberry and chocolate respectively. & Ice cream in stock on 1 minutes Iris and Shiny want some, but Big boo and Hopper fight over which ice cream to give to the sisters.

=== Season 8 (2023–24) ===
No. overall	No. in season	Title	Directed by	Written by	Original release date
183	1	"Stubborn Door"	Andrew Ledenev & Marina Karpova	Andrew Ledenev, Sergey Gashnikov & Andrew Tolkachev	8 December 2023
Big Boo wants to eat some donuts behind a wooden door, but the wooden door refuses to open.
184	2	"Scientific Experiment"	Andrew Ledenev & Marina Karpova	Andrew Ledenev, Sergey Gashnikov & Andrew Tolkachev	15 December 2023
Turbo is performing an experiment with a machine that can make anything a sphere. Hopper unknowingly becomes the test subject for Turbo's experiment.
185	3	"Megamuffin"	Andrew Ledenev & Marina Karpova	Andrew Ledenev, Sergey Gashnikov & Andrew Tolkachev	5 January 2024
The sisters are baking some muffins. Big Boo tries making some but adds too much yeast, causing the muffin to inflate to enormous sizes and pop out of the oven to chase Iris and Shiny until they get stuck in a cave, with the muffin blocking the entrance. Big Boo tries to save the sisters.
186	4	"Magic Fertilizer"	Andrew Ledenev & Marina Karpova	Andrew Ledenev, Sergey Gashnikov & Andrew Tolkachev	19 January 2024
The sisters are gardening when Hopper spills some fertilizer sprinkled with magic on Iris' head, making it so that any plant can grow if she wants to. Iris is mad at Hopper for ruining her beloved bow.
187	5	"Goalkeeper"	Andrew Ledenev & Marina Karpova	Andrew Ledenev, Sergey Gashnikov & Andrew Tolkachev	2 February 2024
Hopper broke his foot while being a goalkeeper and has to rest while S-marty takes care of him, but Hopper still wants to play despite S-marty's orders.
188	6	"Urgent Cleaning"	Andrew Ledenev & Marina Karpova	Andrew Ledenev, Sergey Gashnikov & Andrew Tolkachev	16 February 2024
Big Boo and Hopper are playing when they accidentally destroy everything in S-marty's house and make a huge mess, forcing them to clean everything up before S-marty comes back.
189	7	"Gone Rainbow"	Andrew Ledenev & Marina Karpova	Andrew Ledenev, Sergey Gashnikov, Andrew Tolkachev & Daria Berdnikova	1 March 2024
The bunnies are playing until the sky gets cloudy, making a rainbow that was there beforehand disappear. The bunnies want the rainbow back and Hopper finds a way to paint with light.
190	8	"Sunny Bunnies Delivery Service"	Andrew Ledenev & Marina Karpova	Andrew Ledenev, Sergey Gashnikov, Andrew Tolkachev & Daria Berdnikova	15 March 2024
Iris, Turbo, Big Boo and Shiny want to eat a cake and call Hopper to deliver it to them, but his delivery bicycle crashes and other mishaps completely ruin the cake, forcing him to make another and rush the process.
191	9	"Useful Magic Trick"	Andrew Ledenev & Marina Karpova	Andrew Ledenev, Sergey Gashnikov, Andrew Tolkachev & Daria Berdnikova	22 March 2024
S-marty is showing the Sunny Bunnies a magic trick involving a hat, spawning flowers for Shiny and ice cream for Hopper. Boo is jealous of that ice cream and steals the hat to try to get ice cream for himself.
192	10	"Versatile Tool"	Andrew Ledenev & Marina Karpova	Andrew Ledenev, Sergey Gashnikov, Andrew Tolkachev & Daria Berdnikova	29 March 2024
Iris gets her glasses broken. She uses her tape to fix it, though it has no effect on Shiny's flower, Hopper's toy plan and Boo's chair. She tries to fix Turbo's football.
193	11	"Leaf Blower"	Andrew Ledenev & Marina Karpova	Andrew Ledenev, Sergey Gashnikov, Andrew Tolkachev & Daria Berdnikova	12 April 2024
Hopper steals a leaf blower from S-marty and starts messing with everyone else by using it to inflate their possessions looks like the objects floating like a gravity?
194	12	"Big Boo's Umbrella"	Andrew Ledenev & Marina Karpova	Andrew Ledenev, Sergey Gashnikov, Andrew Tolkachev & Daria Berdnikova	26 April 2024
Big Boo has his umbrella and tries to replicate what others are doing with it. Boo cannot get anything right with the umbrella until it starts to rain.
195	13	"Lord of the Donuts"	Andrew Ledenev & Marina Karpova	Andrew Ledenev, Sergey Gashnikov, Andrew Tolkachev & Daria Berdnikova	10 May 2024
Hopper trips while riding a bicycle and ends up in a donut shop. He tries to make some donuts for himself, but fails by making a burnt mess, extremely bouncy donuts and a giant donut capable of toppling down a ferris wheel with each of his attempts. The only way for him to make actual donuts is by consulting a recipe book.
196	14	"One, Two, Three, Four, Five"	Andrew Ledenev & Marina Karpova	Andrew Ledenev, Sergey Gashnikov, Andrew Tolkachev & Daria Berdnikova	24 May 2024
S-marty has stored a delicious cake in a fridge, and the bunnies will do anything to have it. However, it is locked behind a series of instructions telling them to bring a set number of fruit.
197	15	"Sticky Stickers"	Andrew Ledenev & Marina Karpova	Andrew Ledenev, Sergey Gashnikov, Andrew Tolkachev & Daria Berdnikova	21 June 2024
Hopper decides to mess with S-marty. He puts ticky notes on everything, which, coupled with S-marty's obsessive need for everything to be neat, results in complete chaos.
198	16	"Laughing Together"	Andrew Ledenev & Marina Karpova	Andrew Ledenev, Sergey Gashnikov, Andrew Tolkachev & Daria Berdnikova	5 July 2024
The Sunny Bunnies are preparing a party, but they cannot seem to get anything right, until Hopper discovers a jack-in-the-box, whose hat makes anyone wearing it laugh.
199	17	"Recycling Fun"	Andrew Ledenev & Marina Karpova	Andrew Ledenev, Sergey Gashnikov, Andrew Tolkachev & Daria Berdnikova	19 July 2024
Hopper sees how S-marty puts garbage in designated trash bins and gets a coin for it. He wants a coin too, even if it means he has to fix all the other bunnies' problems.
200	18	"Rules of the Road"	Andrew Ledenev & Marina Karpova	Andrew Ledenev, Sergey Gashnikov, Andrew Tolkachev & Daria Berdnikova	2 August 2024
Every bunny except Hopper are bicycling in a roundabout, while Hopper is playing basketball all by himself until the ball gets in the middle of the crossroad.
201	19	"UFO Pilot"	Andrew Ledenev & Marina Karpova	Andrew Ledenev, Sergey Gashnikov, Andrew Tolkachev & Daria Berdnikova	16 August 2024
Due to an absurd series of events, Hopper manages to knock down a UFO from outer space, and he is not afraid to look inside and control the UFO all by himself.
202	20	"Squishy Sunny Bunnies"	Andrew Ledenev & Marina Karpova	Andrew Ledenev, Sergey Gashnikov, Andrew Tolkachev & Daria Berdnikova	30 August 2024
S-marty has a machine that can make something squishy for him to store things up nicely. But the Sunny Bunnies accidentally get inside the machine and turn into bouncy "pillows".
203	21	"Tasty Treat"	Andrew Ledenev & Marina Karpova	Andrew Ledenev, Sergey Gashnikov, Andrew Tolkachev & Daria Berdnikova	13 September 2024
The bunnies are doing a race again. Big boo quickly loses stamina and falls behind, but a donut-on-a-stick is all it takes for Boo to get all the stamina he needs.
204	22	"Gummy Boo Forever"	Andrew Ledenev & Marina Karpova	Andrew Ledenev, Sergey Gashnikov, Andrew Tolkachev & Daria Berdnikova	27 September 2024
Big Boo likes gumballs and making bubbles from them, and it seems like that can help fix Turbo's football and Hopper's bean bag... though things get trickier with the sisters, who are trapped in the air.
205	23	"Big-eared Pilot"	Andrew Ledenev & Marina Karpova	Andrew Ledenev, Sergey Gashnikov, Andrew Tolkachev & Daria Berdnikova	11 October 2024
Hopper wants to fly like a parrot he found, but he cannot get it to work, until S-marty comes to help.
206	24	"Electro Bunny"	Andrew Ledenev & Marina Karpova	Andrew Ledenev, Sergey Gashnikov, Andrew Tolkachev & Daria Berdnikova	25 October 2024
Turbo is experimenting with a machine to generate electricity. Hopper becomes an unintentional test subject, which also takes out the entire park's electricity supply.
207	25	"Big Sweet Boo"	Andrew Ledenev & Marina Karpova	Andrew Ledenev, Sergey Gashnikov, Andrew Tolkachev & Daria Berdnikova	8 November 2024
The Sunny Bunnies order S-marty to make some cotton candy, but Boo is too impatient and tries to make some for himself, only to become the cotton candy himself.
208	26	"Seesaw"	Andrew Ledenev & Marina Karpova	Andrew Ledenev, Sergey Gashnikov, Andrew Tolkachev & Daria Berdnikova	22 November 2024
Iris and Shiny want the same things, and that brews up a conflict between them. They use a seesaw to create peace in this situation.

=== Season 9 (2024–25) ===
No. overall	No. in season	Title	Directed by	Written by	Original release date
209	1	"Sunny Bunny Float Day"	Andrew Ledenev & Marina Karpova	Andrew Ledenev, Sergey Gashnikov, Andrew Tolkachev & Daria Berdnikova	6 December 2024
Hopper steals a gadget from S-marty that makes anything float or gravity. Things go well for him until he accidentally makes himself float and the gadget subsequently breaks.
210	2	"Problem Solver"	Andrew Ledenev & Marina Karpova	Andrew Ledenev, Sergey Gashnikov, Andrew Tolkachev & Daria Berdnikova	20 December 2024
The Sunny Bunnies are going out camping, and along the way, Big Boo picks up some sticks. They later prove to be invaluable when the tent pops.
211	3	"Sharky Fun"	Andrew Ledenev & Marina Karpova	Andrew Ledenev, Sergey Gashnikov, Andrew Tolkachev & Daria Berdnikova	3 January 2025
Hopper has a toy car that he uses to transport stuff for other bunnies. He accidentally breaks his controller and makes the car go haywire and pick up a balloon shark along the way, who starts chasing the bunnies. Hopper must quickly find a way to save themselves from the shark.
212	4	"Picture Day Mishaps"	Andrew Ledenev & Marina Karpova	Andrew Ledenev, Sergey Gashnikov, Andrew Tolkachev & Daria Berdnikova	17 January 2025
Shiny buys a book where you have to put a designated photo in each of its pages. But not finding the designated thing anywhere, she becomes upset and Big Boo tries to find it instead.
213	5	"Upside Down"	Andrew Ledenev & Marina Karpova	Andrew Ledenev, Sergey Gashnikov, Andrew Tolkachev & Daria Berdnikova	31 January 2025
There is a big storm outside. Big boo is inside a house ready to eat cake, but since the raging wind keeps everything from not being organized, Big Boo just glues everything to the floor. However, what will happen if the entire house ends up getting flipped upside down due to the storm?
214	6	"Meet Mimi"	Andrew Ledenev & Marina Karpova	Andrew Ledenev, Sergey Gashnikov, Andrew Tolkachev & Daria Berdnikova	14 February 2025
Trying to eat a caterpillar, Mimi the frog accidentally launches herself into a truck, from which the sunny bunnies first meet her when she hops out the truck. The bunnies earlier were trying to eat some gummy worms but they were too sour, so they instead want to play with the frog. However, Mimi wants to just eat those gummy worms that look like delicious caterpillars.
215	7	"The Great Watermelon Game"	Andrew Ledenev & Marina Karpova	Andrew Ledenev, Sergey Gashnikov, Andrew Tolkachev & Daria Berdnikova	28 February 2025
The bunnies are playing basketball when their ball suddenly deflates. Meanwhile, S-marty is exhausted from harvesting watermelons and decides to take advantage the bunnies' issue.
216	8	"Magic Stones"	Andrew Ledenev & Marina Karpova	Andrew Ledenev, Sergey Gashnikov, Andrew Tolkachev & Daria Berdnikova	14 March 2025
The parrot returns to steal the bunnies' candies. Trying to get it back, they discover magic stones inside the parrot's nest which gives them superpowers.
217	9	"Day Out with Mimi"	Andrew Ledenev & Marina Karpova	Andrew Ledenev, Sergey Gashnikov, Andrew Tolkachev & Daria Berdnikova	28 March 2025
Mimi is back and the bunnies want to take her out for a walk. However, she gets herself into dangerous situations and the bunnies have to take all the responsibility watching her every move.
218	10	"Dishwashing Challenge"	Andrew Ledenev & Marina Karpova	Andrew Ledenev, Sergey Gashnikov, Andrew Tolkachev & Daria Berdnikova	11 April 2025
Turbo is feeding the others from his café again, but this time the bunnies are making a mess and Turbo has to wash all the dishes for himself. Feeling pity, the others help in their own very unique ways.
219	11	"A Home for Mimi"	Andrew Ledenev & Marina Karpova	Andrew Ledenev, Sergey Gashnikov, Andrew Tolkachev & Daria Berdnikova	25 April 2025
The Bunnies decide to build a cozy little house for their beloved frog Mimi, who keeps stealing their sleeping spots.
220	12	"Paper Playtime"	Andrew Ledenev & Marina Karpova	Andrew Ledenev, Sergey Gashnikov, Andrew Tolkachev & Daria Berdnikova	23 May 2025
The bunnies are doing various activities: Shiny is watering a plant, Iris is picking apples from a tree and Boo is digging in the ground. Hopper tries to recreate these activities with paper, only for it to fail horribly.
221	13	"Mischievous Mimi"	Andrew Ledenev & Marina Karpova	Andrew Ledenev, Sergey Gashnikov, Andrew Tolkachev & Daria Berdnikova	6 June 2025
The Sunny Bunnies are having a picnic in the park, but Mimi keeps secretly taking away all their fruit.
222	14	"Hobby Horse"	Andrew Ledenev & Marina Karpova	Andrew Ledenev, Sergey Gashnikov, Andrew Tolkachev & Daria Berdnikova	20 June 2025
The bunnies are doing a competition on who can ride a toy horse the best. On Hopper's turn, he picks a particularly long toy horse. Which instead of helping him to win the competition easier; makes his life harder in every way.
223	15	"Shooting Trick"	Andrew Ledenev & Marina Karpova	Andrew Ledenev, Sergey Gashnikov, Andrew Tolkachev & Daria Berdnikova	4 July 2025
Hopper is showing his archery skills to the rest of the bunnies with the help of Big Boo. What the other bunnies don't know, is that Hopper doesn't know any archery. Instead, Big Boo puts a magnet in the bullseye to make the arrows always hit. On one unassuming try though, Big Boo forgets to put on the magnet, what comes next is the greatest accidental trickshot.
224	16	"The Floor Is Lava!"	Andrew Ledenev & Marina Karpova	Andrew Ledenev, Sergey Gashnikov, Andrew Tolkachev & Daria Berdnikova	25 July 2025
Big Boo and Hopper visit a museum, where S-Marty shows them prehistoric artifacts. At one point, he starts a simulation of a volcano erupting without knowing that the bunnies were not paying attention. What comes next are the bunnies trying to run for their lives from virtual lava.
225	17	"How to Build a Car"	Andrew Ledenev & Marina Karpova	Andrew Ledenev, Sergey Gashnikov, Andrew Tolkachev & Daria Berdnikova	9 August 2025
Great mechanics Hopper and Big Boo are building race cars from a construction set. But for some reason, the cars won't move. Maybe they should read the assembly instructions first?
226	18	"Say Cheese!"	Andrew Ledenev & Marina Karpova	Andrew Ledenev, Sergey Gashnikov, Andrew Tolkachev & Daria Berdnikova	22 August 2025
To take a good photo of a friend, you need to prepare: adjust the camera, choose the right background, set up the lighting, come up with a striking pose, and... remove the ever-present Mimi, who always finds a way to ruin the shot!
227	19	"Hopper Steals the Show"	Andrew Ledenev & Marina Karpova	Andrew Ledenev, Sergey Gashnikov, Andrew Tolkachev & Daria Berdnikova	5 September 2025
Training frogs is a very tricky task. Mimi isn't very eager to follow Hopper's commands. Hopper tries everything, even showing how to do the commands himself. I wonder, who's really training whom?
228	20	"Rainbow Swings"	Andrew Ledenev & Marina Karpova	Andrew Ledenev, Sergey Gashnikov, Andrew Tolkachev & Daria Berdnikova	19 September 2025
Hopper and Big Boo love swinging on the swings. Hard, very hard! So hard that the swings break apart from their attempts. Crunch! How will they fix the broken swings now?
229	21	"Color Candies"	Andrew Ledenev & Marina Karpova	Andrew Ledenev, Sergey Gashnikov, Andrew Tolkachev & Daria Berdnikova	3 October 2025
In S-Marty's shop, everything is in its place, and candies are sorted by color. Nothing can be moved or mixed. But no one told the mischievous Hopper and MImi about this, and they are causing a complete mess in the shop. Who will gather the scattered candies?
230	22	"It's All in the Hat!"	Andrew Ledenev & Marina Karpova	Andrew Ledenev, Sergey Gashnikov, Andrew Tolkachev & Daria Berdnikova	17 October 2025
Attention, attention! A living hat has appeared in the park! Toys and treats are disappearing as if by magic. If you see the hat, keep a close eye on your things!
231	23	"Rollerblades, Skateboards and Bicycles"	Andrew Ledenev & Marina Karpova	Andrew Ledenev, Sergey Gashnikov, Andrew Tolkachev & Daria Berdnikova	31 October 2025
Rollers, skates and bikes! Today, Hopper decides to try out every type of rideable transport in the park. But Mimi has her own idea of what a fun ride looks like. Can they find the perfect way to ride together?
232	24	"Make It Bigger or Smaller"	Andrew Ledenev & Marina Karpova	Andrew Ledenev, Sergey Gashnikov, Andrew Tolkachev & Daria Berdnikova	14 November 2025
Small Hopper and Big Boo find blasters that can make things bigger or smaller. A tiny ball turns into a huge sphere, and a giant table becomes a little stool. But the real fun is just about to begin!
233	25	"Fetch-o-matic"	Andrew Ledenev & Marina Karpova	Andrew Ledenev, Sergey Gashnikov, Andrew Tolkachev & Daria Berdnikova	28 November 2025
Throw me the ball! Come on, throw the ball! When will you finally throw the ball? Only a machine can handle this! That's right – the automatic machine will help you throw the ball to yourself!
234	26	"Spin for Candy"	Andrew Ledenev & Marina Karpova	Andrew Ledenev, Sergey Gashnikov, Andrew Tolkachev & Daria Berdnikova	12 December 2025
To win a tasty prize, you need a bit of super luck. But what if luck is busy playing in the park and doesn't feel like working? Then your loyal friends will bring luck to you–and the sweet prize along with it!

=== Season 10 (2025–) ===
No. overall	No. in season	Title	Directed by	Written by	Original release date
235	1	"Mimi and the Butterflies"	Andrew Ledenev & Marina Karpova	Andrew Ledenev, Sergey Gashnikov, Andrew Tolkachev & Daria Berdnikova	26 December 2025
236	2	"Time to Get Up!"	Andrew Ledenev & Marina Karpova	Andrew Ledenev, Sergey Gashnikov, Andrew Tolkachev & Daria Berdnikova	9 January 2026
237	3	"Turbo the Doctor"	Andrew Ledenev & Marina Karpova	Andrew Ledenev, Sergey Gashnikov, Andrew Tolkachev & Daria Berdnikova	23 January 2026
238	4	"Mission: Donut"	Andrew Ledenev & Marina Karpova	Andrew Ledenev, Sergey Gashnikov, Andrew Tolkachev & Daria Berdnikova	7 February 2026
239	5	"Pizza Time!"	Andrew Ledenev & Marina Karpova	Andrew Ledenev, Sergey Gashnikov, Andrew Tolkachev & Daria Berdnikova	21 February 2026
240	6	"Mini Mimi"	Andrew Ledenev & Marina Karpova	Andrew Ledenev, Sergey Gashnikov, Andrew Tolkachev & Daria Berdnikova	7 March 2026
241	7	"Mimi's Favourite Toy"	Andrew Ledenev & Marina Karpova	Andrew Ledenev, Sergey Gashnikov, Andrew Tolkachev & Daria Berdnikova	21 March 2026
242	8	"How to Walk Mimi"	Andrew Ledenev & Marina Karpova	Andrew Ledenev, Sergey Gashnikov, Andrew Tolkachev & Daria Berdnikova	4 April 2026
243	9	"That One Thing"	Andrew Ledenev & Marina Karpova	Andrew Ledenev, Sergey Gashnikov, Andrew Tolkachev & Daria Berdnikova	18 April 2026
244	10	"Grab It Quick!"	Andrew Ledenev & Marina Karpova	Andrew Ledenev, Sergey Gashnikov, Andrew Tolkachev & Daria Berdnikova	2 May 2026
245	11	"Ice Cream, Please"	Andrew Ledenev & Marina Karpova	Andrew Ledenev, Sergey Gashnikov, Andrew Tolkachev & Daria Berdnikova	16 May 2026
246	12	"Fix-It Hopper!"	Andrew Ledenev & Marina Karpova	Andrew Ledenev, Sergey Gashnikov, Andrew Tolkachev & Daria Berdnikova	30 May 2026
247	13	"Jumping House"	Andrew Ledenev & Marina Karpova	Andrew Ledenev, Sergey Gashnikov, Andrew Tolkachev & Daria Berdnikova	13 June 2026
248	14	"Gone with the Phone"	Andrew Ledenev & Marina Karpova	Andrew Ledenev, Sergey Gashnikov, Andrew Tolkachev & Daria Berdnikova	27 June 2026
249	15	"Hopper’s Cube Craft"	Andrew Ledenev & Marina Karpova	Andrew Ledenev, Sergey Gashnikov, Andrew Tolkachev & Daria Berdnikova	11 July 2026
250	16	"Mimi and Wormy"	Andrew Ledenev & Marina Karpova	Andrew Ledenev, Sergey Gashnikov, Andrew Tolkachev & Daria Berdnikova	8 August 2026
251	17	"Zoo Selfies"	Andrew Ledenev & Marina Karpova	Andrew Ledenev, Sergey Gashnikov, Andrew Tolkachev & Daria Berdnikova	22 August 2026
252	18	"Mimi and the Copy Machine"	Andrew Ledenev & Marina Karpova	Andrew Ledenev, Sergey Gashnikov, Andrew Tolkachev & Daria Berdnikova	5 September 2026
253	19	"Little Tricksters"	Andrew Ledenev & Marina Karpova	Andrew Ledenev, Sergey Gashnikov, Andrew Tolkachev & Daria Berdnikova	19 September 2026
254	20	"Freeze! Unfreeze!"	Andrew Ledenev & Marina Karpova	Andrew Ledenev, Sergey Gashnikov, Andrew Tolkachev & Daria Berdnikova	10 October 2026
255	21	"Big Boo Goes Bananas"	Andrew Ledenev & Marina Karpova	Andrew Ledenev, Sergey Gashnikov, Andrew Tolkachev & Daria Berdnikova	24 October 2026
256	22	"Funny Hypnosis"	Andrew Ledenev & Marina Karpova	Andrew Ledenev, Sergey Gashnikov, Andrew Tolkachev & Daria Berdnikova	7 November 2026
257	23	"The Hiccup Checkup"	Andrew Ledenev & Marina Karpova	Andrew Ledenev, Sergey Gashnikov, Andrew Tolkachev & Daria Berdnikova	21 November 2026
258	24	TBA	Andrew Ledenev & Marina Karpova	Andrew Ledenev, Sergey Gashnikov, Andrew Tolkachev & Daria Berdnikova	TBA
259	25	TBA	Andrew Ledenev & Marina Karpova	Andrew Ledenev, Sergey Gashnikov, Andrew Tolkachev & Daria Berdnikova	TBA
260	26	TBA	Andrew Ledenev & Marina Karpova	Andrew Ledenev, Sergey Gashnikov, Andrew Tolkachev & Daria Berdnikova	TBA
